= Naidu =

Title used by Telugu castes

Naidu (also spelled as Nayudu, Naidoo) is a Telugu title commonly used by various Telugu castes. 'Nayudu/Naidu' is a contraction of the Telugu word 'Nayakudu' meaning leader, chief, headman. Telugu castes such as the Kapu/Balija, Kamma, Gavara, Golla, Turpu Kapu, Velama, Boya among others use the title.

In Rayalaseema and North / Western Tamil Nadu, the term Naidu primarily refers to the Kamma caste.

In Coastal Andhra, the term Naidu primarily refers to the Kapu caste.

== Notable people ==
People bearing the title Naidu include:

- Ama Naidoo, social activist from South Africa
- Baddukonda Appala Naidu, politician, YSRCP leader
- B. Munuswamy Naidu, former Chief Minister of Madras Presidency
- Buchi Babu Naidu, Indian cricket pioneer known as the 'father of South Indian cricket'
- Chandra Nayudu, India's first female cricket commentator
- Chota K. Naidu, Telugu cinematographer
- C. K. Nayudu, first captain of the Indian cricket team and one of India's greatest cricketers
- C. S. Nayudu, Indian Test cricketer from 1934 to 1952
- D. K. Adikesavulu Naidu, former chairman of Tirumala Tirupati Devasthanams
- Dwaram Venkataswamy Naidu, Carnatic violinist
- Daggubati Ramanaidu, Telugu film producer
- Gali Muddu Krishnama Naidu, member of Telugu Desam Party
- Galla Ramachandra Naidu, Indian industrialist, the founder of Amara Raja Group of companies
- Gorle Sriramulu Naidu, former Minister, Congress Party, Andhra Pradesh
- Grandhi Venkata Reddy Naidu, first Law Minister of Andhra Pradesh
- G. D. Naidu, scientist, inventor and businessman, known as "Edison of India"
- K. Govindaswamy Naidu, entrepreneur, founder of KG Group
- Kamisetty Parasuram Naidu, Speaker of Pondicherry Assembly (1985–1989)
- Kodi Rammurthy Naidu, bodybuilder, strongman, and wrestler
- Kondapalli Pydithalli Naidu, former Member of Parliament; Telugu Desam Party leader
- Kondapalli Appala Naidu, Telugu Desam Party leader
- Kuppuswami Naidu, entrepreneur, founder of Lakshmi Mills
- Kurma Venkata Reddi Naidu, former Chief Minister and Governor of Madras Presidency
- K. Venkataswami Naidu, politician
- Leela Naidu, Indian actress
- M. Venkaiah Naidu, 13th Vice President of India
- Nalla Reddi Naidu, former Member of Parliament
- Naransamy Roy Naidoo, social activist in South Africa
- Nimmala Rama Naidu, politician, Telugu Desam Party
- Nishvika Naidu, actress
- N. Chandrababu Naidu, current Chief Minister of Andhra Pradesh, leader of Telugu Desam Party
- P. Varadarajulu Naidu, Indian physician, politician, journalist and Indian independence activist
- P. S. Govindasamy Naidu, educator, founder of PSG Group
- P. R. Ramadas Naidu, filmmaker
- P. V. Rangayya Naidu, former Director General of Police, 10th Lok Sabha of India
- Padmaja Naidu, freedom fighter
- Palnati Brahmanaidu, minister of a small Andhra kingdom of Palnadu
- Pathivada Narayanaswamy Naidu, former Minister, Andhra Pradesh
- Pemmasani Ramalinga Nayudu, commander of a Vijayanagara military unit
- Prakash Nayudu, represented Madhya Pradesh cricket team
- Raghupathi Venkaiah Naidu, filmmaker widely known as the "father of Telugu cinema"
- Raghupathi Venkataratnam Naidu, Indian social reformer and educationist
- Ramesh Naidu, National Award-winning music composer
- Sarojini Naidu, independence activist and poet known as "nightingale of India"
- Sobha Naidu, classical dancer
- Shruti Naidu, producer
- Srihari S. Naidu, physician
- Subbaiah Naidu, actor
- S. R. A. S. Appala Naidu, politician, former MP and state minister
- Thapi Dharma Rao Naidu, writer, journalist, winner of Sahitya Akademi Award
- Thota Narasayya Naidu, freedom fighter
- Vasireddy Venkatadri Nayudu, Amaravathi Raja
