= Vizianagaram Lok Sabha constituency =

Lok Sabha Constituency in Andhra Pradesh

Coordinates: 18.1°N 83.4°E

Vizianagaram AP-3
- Lok Sabha constituency
- Interactive Map Outlining Vizianagaram Lok Sabha constituency

Constituency details
- Country: India
- Region: South India
- State: Andhra Pradesh
- Assembly constituencies: Etcherla; Rajam; Bobbili; Cheepurupalli; Gajapathinagaram; Nellimarla; Vizianagaram
- Established: 2008
- Reservation: None

Member of Parliament
- 18th Lok Sabha
- Incumbent Appalanaidu Kalisetti
- Party: TDP
- Alliance: NDA
- Elected year: 2024
- Preceded by: Bellana Chandra Sekhar

Vizianagaram Lok Sabha constituency is one of the twenty-five lok sabha constituencies of Andhra Pradesh in India. As per the Delimitation of Parliamentary and Assembly Constituencies Order (2008), it was formed with seven assembly segments belongs to Vizianagaram and Srikakulam districts .

== Assembly segments ==
The seven Assembly segments of Vizianagaram Lok Sabha constituency are:

#	Name	District	Member	Party	Leading (in 2024)
7	Etcherla	Srikakulam	Nadukuditi Eswara Rao	BJP	TDP
9	Rajam (SC)	Vizianagaram	Kondru Murali Mohan	TDP	TDP
14	Bobbili	Vizianagaram	R. V. S. K. K. Ranga Rao (Babynayana)	TDP	TDP
15	Cheepurupalli	Vizianagaram	Kimidi Kalavenkata Rao	TDP	TDP
16	Gajapathinagaram	Vizianagaram	Kondapalli Srinivas	TDP	TDP
17	Nellimarla	Vizianagaram	Lokam Naga Madhavi	JSP	TDP
18	Vizianagaram	Vizianagaram	Pusapati Aditi Vijayalakshmi	TDP	TDP

== Members of Parliament ==
Year	Member	Party
1967–2009: Bobbili
2009	Botsa Jhansi Lakshmi	Indian National Congress
2014	Pusapati Ashok Gajapathi Raju	Telugu Desam Party
2019	Bellana Chandra Sekhar	YSR Congress Party
2024	Appalanaidu Kalisetti	Telugu Desam Party

== Election results ==
=== 2024 ===
2024 Indian general elections: Vizianagaram
Party	Candidate	Votes	%	±%
TDP	Appalanaidu Kalisetti	743,113	57.20	▲13.65
YSRCP	Bellana Chandra Sekhar	4,93,762	38.00	▼9.49
NOTA	None of the Above	23,250	1.79	N/A
INC	Bobbili Srinu	10,623	0.82	▼0.47
Majority		2,49,351	19.19	▲15.27
Turnout		13,07,632	82.19	▲0.91
TDP gain from YSRCP		Swing		

=== 2019 ===
2019 Indian general elections: Vizianagaram
Party	Candidate	Votes	%	±%
YSRCP	Bellana Chandra Sekhar	578,418	47.49	▲9.14
TDP	Ashok Gajapathi Raju Pusapati	530,382	43.55	▼4.34
JSP	Mukka Srinivasa Rao	34,192	2.81	New
INC	Adiraju Yedla	15,725	1.29	▼9.64
BJP	Sanyasi Raju Pakalapati	7,266	0.60	▲0.60
Majority		48,036	3.92	▼5.62
Turnout		12,24,433	81.28	▲1.49
Registered electors		15,03,980		
YSRCP gain from TDP		Swing		

=== General Election 2014 ===
2014 Indian general elections : Vizianagaram
Party	Candidate	Votes	%	±%
TDP	Ashok Gajapathi Raju Pusapati	536,549	47.89	▲13.47
YSRCP	Ravu Venkata Swetha Chalapathi Kumara Krishna Rangarao	429,638	38.35	New
INC	Botsa Jhansi Lakshmi	122,487	10.93	▼29.43
NOTA	None of the Above	6,528	0.58	N/A
Majority		106,911	9.54	▲3.60
Turnout		112,0,316	79.79	▲2.72
TDP gain from INC		Swing		

=== General Election 2009 ===
2009 Indian general elections: Vizianagaram
Party	Candidate	Votes	%	±%
INC	Botcha Jhansi Lakshmi	411,584	40.36	
TDP	Kondapalli Appala Naidu	351,013	34.42	
PRP	Kimidi Ganapathi Rao	172,034	16.87	
Majority		60,571	5.94	
Turnout		1,019,825	77.07	
INC win (new seat)				

== See also ==
- List of constituencies of the Andhra Pradesh Legislative Assembly
