= Kondapalli (surname) =

Kondapalli, Kondapally (Telugu: కొండపల్లి), or Kondapalle (Telugu: కొండపల్లె) is a Telugu surname. Notable people with the surname include:

- Kondapalli Appala Naidu (born 1967), Indian politician
- Kondapalli Dasaradh Kumar (born 1971), Indian film director and screenwriter
- Kondapalli Koteswaramma (1918–2018), Indian communist leader, writer, and feminist
- Kondapalli Seetharamaiah (1914–2002), Indian communist leader
- Kondapalli Srinivas, Indian politician
- Srikanth Kondapalli, Indian professor
