= Botcha Appalanarasayya =

Indian politician

Botsa Appalanarasayya

Member of the Legislative Assembly Andhra Pradesh
- In office 2019–2024
- Preceded by: Kondapalli Appala Naidu
- Succeeded by: Kondapalli Srinivas
- Constituency: Gajapathinagaram
- In office 2009–2014
- Preceded by: Aruna Padala
- Succeeded by: Kondapalli Appala Naidu
- Constituency: Gajapathinagaram

Personal details
- Party: YSR Congress Party (2015 - Present)
- Other political affiliations: Indian National Congress (2009 - 2015)
- Relations: Botsa Satyanarayana (brother); Botsa Jhansi Lakshmi (sister-in-law)
- Education: Gitam College
- Occupation: Politician

Botsa Appalanarasayya, is an Indian politician from the state of Andhra Pradesh. He was elected as the Member of the Legislative Assembly (MLA) from Gajapathinagaram Assembly constituency in 2019 on behalf of YSR Congress Party (YSRCP) and also served as the MLA during 2009–2014 on behalf of Indian National Congress.

== Early life ==
Botcha Appalanarasayya was born to Gurunaidu and Eswaramma. He has 6 brothers, of whom Botsa Satyanarayana is the eldest and the others younger, and 4 sisters. He is a relative of Baddukonda Appala Naidu. He graduated from Gitam College, Visakhapatnam in 1985.

== Career ==
Appalanarasayya contested the 2009 Andhra Pradesh Legislative Assembly election from Gajapathinagaram constituency on behalf of Congress and won as the MLA. He later contested the 2014 elections but lost the election. However, he and his brother Satyanarayana were the only two candidates, out of 175 Congress candidates contested in the 2014 elections held for all the 175 constituencies, who were able to retain deposits. He left Congress and joined YSRCP in June 2015. He then contested the 2019 elections and won as the MLA.
