= Botsa Satyanarayana =

Indian politician

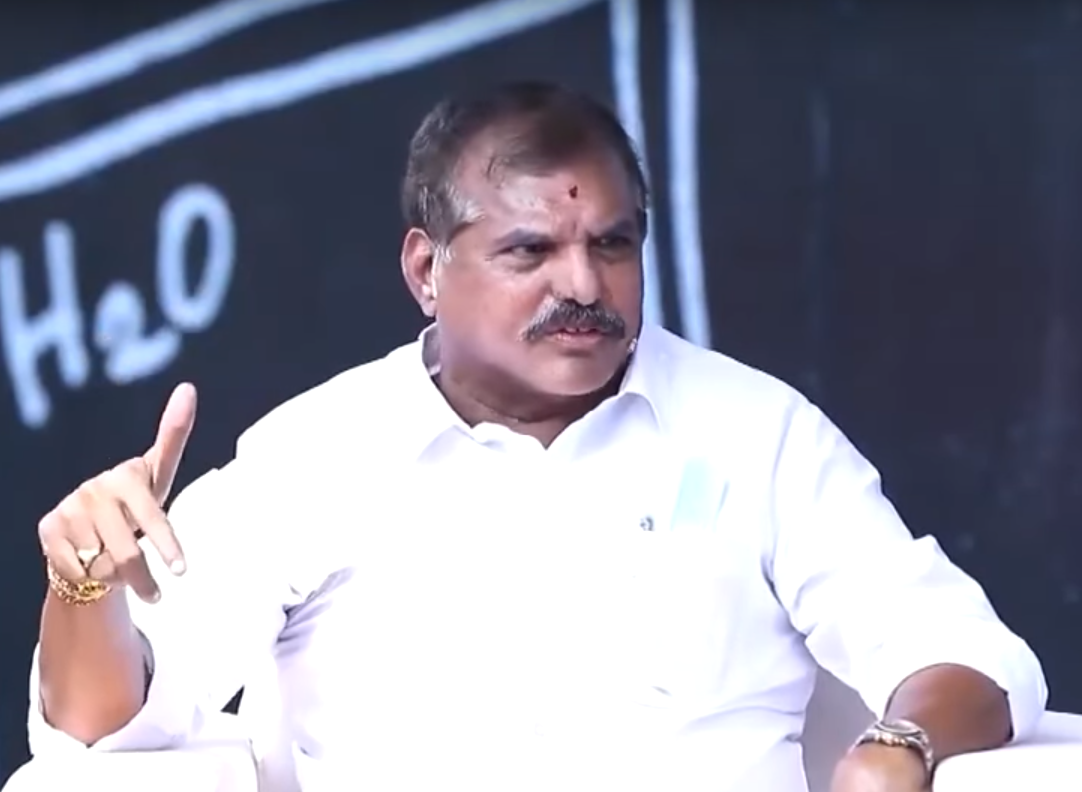
- Satyanarayana as Minister in 2024

Leader of the Opposition of Legislative Council Andhra Pradesh
- Incumbent
- Assumed office 22 August 2024
- Chairperson: Koyye Moshenu Raju
- Deputy Chairperson: Zakia Khanam
- Leader of the House: N. Chandrababu Naidu
- Preceded by: Lella Appi Reddy
- Constituency: Elected by Local Authorities of Visakhapatnam.

MLC
- Incumbent
- Assumed office 21 August 2024
- Chair: Koyye Moshenu Raju
- Deputy Chair: Zakia Khanam
- Leader of the House: N. Chandrababu Naidu
- Constituency: Elected by Local Authorities of Visakhapatnam

Minister of Education Government of Andhra Pradesh
- In office 11 April 2022 – 12 June 2024
- Governor: Biswabhusan Harichandan; S. Abdul Nazeer
- Chief Minister: Y. S. Jagan Mohan Reddy
- Preceded by: Audimulapu Suresh
- Succeeded by: Nara Lokesh

Minister of Municipal Administration and Urban Development Government of Andhra Pradesh
- In office 8 June 2019 – 7 April 2022
- Governor: E. S. L. Narasimhan; Biswabhusan Harichandan
- Chief Minister: Y. S. Jagan Mohan Reddy
- Preceded by: Ponguru Narayana
- Succeeded by: Audimulapu Suresh

33rd President of the Andhra Pradesh Congress Committee
- In office 2011–2014
- AICC President: Sonia Gandhi
- Preceded by: Dharmapuri Srinivas
- Succeeded by: Raghu Veera Reddy (bifurcated Andhra)

Minister of Transport Government of Andhra Pradesh
- In office 25 November 2010 – 21 February 2014
- Governor: E. S. L. Narasimhan
- Chief Minister: Nallari Kiran Kumar Reddy
- Preceded by: S.Vijaya Rama Raju
- Succeeded by: Kinjarapu Atchannaidu

Minister of Panchayati Raj Government of Andhra Pradesh
- In office 25 May 2009 – 25 November 2010
- Governor: N. D. Tiwari; E. S. L. Narasimhan
- Chief Minister: Y. S. Rajasekhara Reddy; Konijeti Rosaiah
- Preceded by: J. C. Diwakar Reddy
- Succeeded by: Jana Reddy

Minister of Housing Government of Andhra Pradesh
- In office 14 May 2004 – 20 May 2009
- Governor: Surjit Singh Barnala; Sushilkumar Shinde; Rameshwar Thakur; N. D. Tiwari
- Chief Minister: Y. S. Rajasekhara Reddy
- Preceded by: K.Errannaidu
- Succeeded by: Silpa Mohan Reddy

Member of Legislative Assembly Andhra Pradesh
- In office 2019–2024
- Preceded by: Kimidi Mrunalini
- Succeeded by: Kimidi Kalavenkata Rao
- Constituency: Cheepurupalli
- In office 2004–2014
- Preceded by: Gadde Babu Rao
- Succeeded by: Kimidi Mrunalini
- Constituency: Cheepurupalli

Member of Parliament, Lok Sabha
- In office 11 October 1999 — 16 May 2004
- Preceded by: Kondapalli Pydithalli Naidu
- Succeeded by: Kondapalli Pydithalli Naidu
- Constituency: Bobbili

Personal details
- Born: 9 July 1958 (age 68) Vizianagaram, Andhra Pradesh, India
- Party: YSR Congress Party (2015 – Present)
- Other political affiliations: Indian National Congress (1996-2015)
- Spouse: Botcha Jhansi Lakshmi
- Children: 2

Botsa Satyanarayana (born 9 July 1958) is an Indian politician from Andhra Pradesh. and current leader of opposition in legislative council. He belonged to the Indian National Congress until 2015 and he joined the YSR Congress on 7 June 2015. He is a former cabinet minister for Municipal Administration and Urban Development in Andhra Pradesh. He is also the last president of United APCC.

== Political career ==
Satyanarayana won the Bobbili parliamentary constituency in 1999 as an MP. Due to the NDA climate, the Indian National Congress party won only 5 MPs from Andhra Pradesh and Satyanarayana was one of them. He represented as MLA from Cheepurupalli Assembly constituency in 2004, 2009. He served as Minister for Heavy Industries, Panchayati Raj, Housing, Transport and Marketing. He served as the president of Andhra Pradesh Congress Committee.

After Y. S. Rajasekhara Reddy's death due to helicopter crash in 2009, Konijeti Rosaiah, Nallari Kiran Kumar Reddy served as the chief ministers of Andhra Pradesh. At that time, Satyanarayana's name also came up in the campaign as the chief ministerial candidate.

In 2015, Satyanarayana resigned from the Indian National Congress party and joined the YSR Congress Party‌ along with his family and supporters. He represented third time MLA from Cheepurupalli constituency in 2019 and served as the Minister for Municipal Administration and Urban Development in the Government of Andhra Pradesh from 8 June 2019 to 7 April 2022.

== Electoral History ==
Year	Constituency	Party	Votes	%	Opponent	Party	Votes	%	Result	Margin	%
2024	Cheepurupalli	YSRCP	76,254	44.06	Kalavenkatarao Kimidi	TDP	88,225	50.98	Lost	-11,971	-6.92
2019	Cheepurupalli	YSRCP	89,262	53.81	Nagarjuna Kimidi	TDP	62,764	37.84	Won	+26,498	+15.97
2014	Cheepurupalli	INC	42,945	27.88	Kimidi Mrunalini	TDP	63,787	41.41	Lost	-20,842	-13.53
2009	Cheepurupalli	INC	60,677	42.65	Gadde Baburao	TDP	54,735	38.47	Won	+5,942	+4.18
2004	Cheepurupalli	INC	58,008	52.62	Gadde Baburao	TDP	46,974	42.61	Won	+11,034	+10.01

== Personal life ==
Satyanarayana is married to Botcha Jhansi Lakshmi who was elected as a Lok Sabha representative from Bobbili constituency in 2006 and Vizianagaram constituency in 2009. He has a brother, Botcha Appala Narasaiah, who is also a politician.
