= Pusapati Ananda Gajapati Raju (born 1950) =

Indian politician

Poosapati Ananda Gajapati Raju
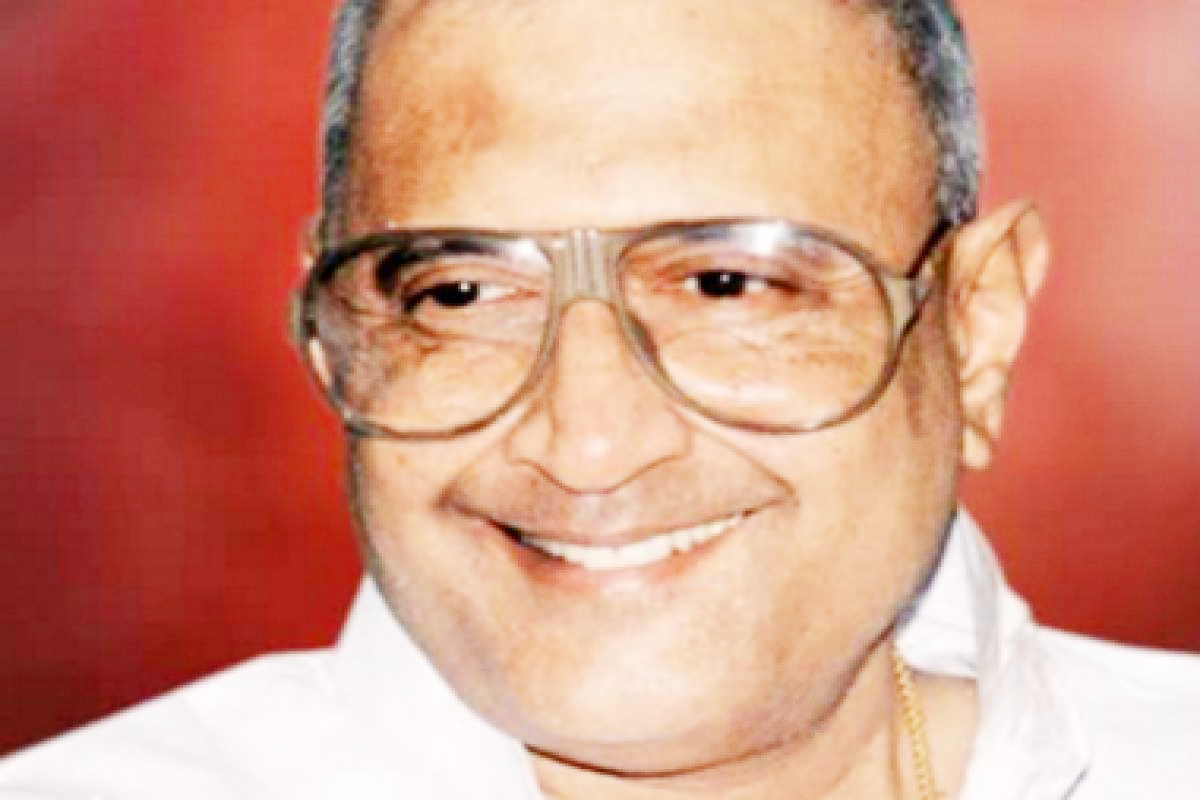

Member of Parliament
- In office 1991–1996
- Preceded by: Kemburi Ramamohan Rao
- Succeeded by: Kondapalli Pydithalli Naidu
- Constituency: Bobbili
- In office 1984–1989
- Preceded by: P. V. G. Raju
- Succeeded by: Kemburi Ramamohan Rao
- Constituency: Bobbili

Personal details
- Born: 17 July 1950 Vizianagaram, Vizianagaram estate (now in Andhra Pradesh, India)
- Died: 26 March 2016 (aged 65)
- Party: Indian National Congress Telugu Desam Party
- Children: 3

Pusapati Ananda Gajapati Raju Vijayanagaram Pusapati royalist, former minister, Chairman of Mansa Trust.

== Personal life ==
He was born on 17 July 1950, as the first child of Maharaja PVG Raju and Kusumagajapati. His brother Ashok Gajapathi Raju and sister Sunita Devi. He completed his primary education in Scindia School Gwalior. He went to Madras Loyola College for his bachelors in economics, holds an MBA from American Stetson University education and a PhD in economics from Andhra University. He was awarded an honorary doctorate in Humanistic Studies by the Inter-American University of Florida, USA in 2003. He received his PhD from Andhra University in 2009. He held a flying licence and was an active member of madras flying club. He enjoyed playing cricket and tennis. He became the Chairman of MANSAS Trust and the hereditary trustee of Simhachalam Temple in 1995, remaining in this prestigious post until the end of his life in 2016. He was married twice, divorced his ex wife in 1991 and remarried his current wife in 1998.

== Political career ==
In 1980, he contested as Janata Party (Secular) candidate for the 7th Lok Sabha elections in the Anakapalle constituency and lost to the Congress contestant S. R. A. S. Appala Naidu by a margin of 2,43,968 votes. He joined the Telugu Desam Party in 1983 and made his political debut. 1983 Elected Member of Legislative Assembly from Bhimunipatnam Legislative Assembly Constituency. He served as a minister of Andhra Pradesh and twice as a Member of Parliament. His brother is Union Minister Ashok Gajapathi Raju. He was first elected as a member of the Legislative Assembly of Bhimili. He served as Minister of Education and Health in Nandamuri Taraka Rama Rao's cabinet. In 1984, Bobbili won as MP on behalf of TDP. Later he disagreed with NTR and joined Congress. In the 1989 elections, Bobbili contested for the Lok Sabha and lost. Won the 1991 elections. He contested the 1996 and 1998 Lok Sabha elections from Visakhapatnam and lost. He has been staying away from politics since 1998.

== Death ==
Pusapati Ananda Gajapati Raju died at 8.30 am on 26 March 2016 while undergoing treatment for severe chest pain.
