= Bobbili Lok Sabha constituency =

Former Indian electoral district

Coordinates: 18.6°N 83.4°E

Bobbili
- Former Lok Sabha constituency

Constituency details
- Country: India
- Region: South India
- State: Andhra Pradesh
- Assembly constituencies: Bobbili; Therlam; Etcherla; Cheepurupalli; Gajapathinagaram; Vizianagaram; Sathivada
- Established: 1963
- Abolished: 2008
- Reservation: None

Bobbili was one of the 25 Lok Sabha constituencies of Andhra Pradesh in India. It was one of the Lok Sabha constituency in Vizianagaram district of Andhra Pradesh till 2008.

== Members of Parliament ==
| Year | Winner | Party |
|---|---|---|
| 1967 | K. Narayana Rao | Indian National Congress |
| 1971 | K. Narayana Rao | Indian National Congress |
| 1977 | P. V. G. Raju | Indian National Congress |
| 1980 | P. V. G. Raju | Indian National Congress |
| 1984 | Pusapati Ananda Gajapati Raju | Telugu Desam Party |
| 1989 | Kemburi Ramamohan Rao | Telugu Desam Party |
| 1991 | Pusapati Ananda Gajapati Raju | Indian National Congress |
| 1996 | Kondapalli Pydithalli Naidu | Telugu Desam Party |
| 1998 | Kondapalli Pydithalli Naidu | Telugu Desam Party |
| 1999 | Botsa Satyanarayana | Indian National Congress |
| 2004 | Kondapalli Pydithalli Naidu | Telugu Desam Party |
Constituency Demolished in 2008 after Delimitation Commission of India Report.

== Election results ==
=== 2004 ===
2004 Indian general elections: Bobbili
| Party | Candidate | Votes | % | ±% |
|---|---|---|---|---|
| TDP | Kondapalli Pydithalli Naidu | 373,922 | 50.07 | +1.67 |
| INC | Botsa Jhansi Lakshmi | 342,574 | 45.88 | −3.07 |
| Independent | Peddinti Jaganmohan Rao | 16,098 | 2.16 | |
| TRS | G. Venkatesh | 14,131 | 1.90 | |
| Majority | | 31,348 | 4.19 | +4.64 |
| Turnout | | 746,725 | 76.54 | +1.08 |
| TDP hold | | Swing | +1.67 | |

=== 1998 ===
1998 Indian general election: Bobbili
| Party | Candidate | Votes | % | ±% |
|---|---|---|---|---|
| TDP | Kondapalli Pydithalli Naidu | 298,961 | 43.89 | |
| INC | Botsa Satyanarayana | 2,72,053 | 39.94 | |
| BJP | Vasireddy Varada Rama Rao | 1,05,959 | 15.55 | |
| Margin of victory | | 26,908 | 3.95 | |
| Turnout | | 6,81,194 | 73.75 | |
| TDP hold | | Swing | | |

== See also ==
- Bobbili
- List of constituencies of the Lok Sabha
