= Gorle Kiran Kumar =

Indian politician (born 1972)

Gorle Kiran Kumar (born 1972) is an Indian politician from Andhra Pradesh. He won the 2019 Andhra Pradesh Legislative Assembly Election on YSRCP ticket from Etcherla constituency in Srikakulam district. He defeated Kimidi Kalavenkata Rao of Telugu Desam Party by a margin of 18,711 votes. Despite opposition from local leaders, he was nominated again to contest from the Etcherla seat for the 2024 Assembly Election.

== Early life and education ==
His father Suryanaayana Naidu is a farmer. He hails from Patharlapalli village, Ranastalam mandal, Srikakulam district. He did his post graduation in commerce from Maharaja Degree College, Vizianagaram.

== Career ==
His political journey started with Indian National Congress and when the YSR Congress party started, he joined the new party. He contested the Etcherla MLA seat on YSRCP ticket in 2014 but lost the election to Kimidi Kalavenkata Rao. In 2019, he was elected from the same seat on YSRCP ticket defeating Kalavenkata Rao, who was then the Minister for Energy and state president of TDP.
