= Vunukuru =

- village
- Interactive map of Vunukuru
- Location in Andhra Pradesh, India
- Country: India
- State: Andhra Pradesh
- District: Vizianagaram

Languages
  - Official: Telugu
- Time zone: UTC+5:30 (IST)
- Vehicle registration: AP

Vunukuru or Unukuru is a village panchayat in Regidi Amadalavalasa mandal of Vizianagaram district in Andhra Pradesh, India.

== Assembly constituency ==
Vunukuru was an assembly constituency in Andhra Pradesh from 1955 to 2004. It was merged with Rajam constituency in 2009 election.

List of Elected Members:

- 1978 - Babu Parankusam Mudili, Janata Party
- 1983 - Kimidi Kala Venkata Rao, Telugu Desam Party
- 1985 - Kimidi Kala Venkata Rao, Telugu Desam Party
- 1989 - Kimidi Kala Venkata Rao, Telugu Desam Party
- 1994 - Palavalasa Rajasekharam, Indian National Congress
- 1999 - Kimidi Ganapathi Rao, Telugu Desam Party
- 2004 - Kimidi Kala Venkata Rao, Telugu Desam Party
