= Gorle Sriramulu Naidu =

Indian politician

Gorle Sriramulu Naidu is an Andhra Pradesh politician and Congress Party leader. He served in Srikakulam politics from 1956 to 1983.

== Early life ==
Naidu was born in Patarlapalli village in Ranastalam, a mandal of Srikakulam district, in the Indian state of Andhra Pradesh.

== Career ==
He was elected Sarpanch of Patarlapalli in 1959. In 1964, he became President of Panchayat Samiti, by winning the election, and becoming the Chairman of the Srikakulam Zilla Parishad. In 1978, he was presented as a member of the Legislative Council and served as a minister in Andhra Pradesh. As a Minister, he served as the Chairman of Zilla Parishad in 1981. In the 1983 elections, he lost to Tripurana Venkata Ratnam from Cheepurupalli Assembly constituency.

=== Madduvalasa project ===
The Madduvalasa Reservoir Project is an irrigation project built on the Swarnamukhi River, a tributary of the Nagavali River in Srikakulam district. The project was named Sri Gorle Sriramulu Naidu Madduvalasa Reservoir Project.

== Legacy ==
Dharmana Krishnadas, Deputy Chief Minister of Andhra Pradesh, unveiled a statue of Naidu near the Lion Gate on Kims Hospital Road under the auspices of the Indian National Trust for Art and Cultural Heritage (INTAC).
