= Nadukuditi Eswara Rao =

Indian politician

Nadukuditi Eswara Rao (MLA)

Member of the Andhra Pradesh Legislative Assembly
- Incumbent
- Assumed office 2024
- Preceded by: Gorle Kiran Kumar
- Constituency: Etcherla

Personal details
- Born: 7 July
- Party: Bharatiya Janta Party

Nadukuditi Eswara Rao is an Indian politician from Andhra Pradesh. He is a member of Bharatiya Janta Party. He has been elected as the Member of the Legislative Assembly representing the Etcherla Assembly constituency in 2024 Andhra Pradesh Legislative Assembly elections. He is an illustrious alumnus of IIM Kolkata. The NER School of Excellence was founded by him in Nadukuditi Palem, Bantupalli(P), Ranastalam Mandal, Srikakulam, Andhra Pradesh, with a vision to provide quality education to all.
