= Sarasanapalli =

- Gram panchayat
- Interactive map of Sarasanapalli
- Location in Andhra Pradesh, India
- Country: India
- State: Andhra Pradesh
- District: Vizianagaram
- Talukas: Regidi Amadalavalasa

Population
  - Total: 1,200

Languages
  - Official: Telugu
- Time zone: UTC+5:30 (IST)
- PIN: 532122
- Telephone code: 08941
- Vehicle registration: AP

Sarasanapalli is a village in Regidi Amadalavalasa mandal of Vizianagaram district, Andhra Pradesh, India.

== Sarasanapalli Panchayat ==
=== Panchayat Presidents ===
Year	President	Opponent	Majority of votes
2013-2017	Pyla Padmavati	Karri Mena	294
2006-2011	Khandapu Chandravathi	Pyla KameswaraRao	12
2001-2006	Khandapu Chandravathi	Pyla padmavati	6
2006?-	Gunana Sangamashu	??	??
