= Meesala Geetha =

Indian politician

Meesala Geetha (born 17 September 1977) is an Indian politician from Andhra Pradesh. She won the 2014 Andhra Pradesh Legislative Assembly election from Vizianagaram Constituency in Vizianagaram district on TDP ticket. She is a first time MLA.

== Early life and education ==
Geetha was born in Vizianagaram. Her father's name is G. Sadhu Rao. She married Meesala Srinivasa Rao. She is a commerce graduate from MR women's college, Vizianagaram. She belongs to Turpu Kapu community.

== Career ==
As district convenor, Geetha made her electoral debut from Vizianagaram constituency on Praja Rajyam Party ticket in 2009 but lost the election which was won by Pusapati Ashok Gajapathi Raju, who defeated TDP candidate Kolagatla Veerabhadra Swamy. Later, she joined the Indian National Congress Party and worked as Municipal Chairperson. But on 17 February 2014, she resigned from the post of chairperson and from the primary membership of the Congress party, and joined TDP. She contested the 2014 Andhra Pradesh Legislative Assembly Election on TDP ticket and won by a margin of 15,404 votes defeating Congress leader Kolagatla Veerabhadra Swamy. In 2019, she was dropped by TDP and did not contest the Assembly election. Aditi Gajapathi, the daughter of Ashok Gajapathi Raju, was given the TDP ticket but she lost the election to Swamy.

Again, she was dropped by TDP, for the 2024 Andhra Pradesh Legislative Assembly Election from Vizianagaram and she is contesting as independent candidate. However, the Election Commission allotted the 'glass' symbol, which is identified with Jana Sena Party.

Earlier in 2023, she started a post card campaign for release of Chandra Babu Naidu, who was jailed in Rajahmundry.
