= Kemburi Ramamohan Rao =

Indian politician (1949–2024)

Member of Legislative Assembly Andhra Pradesh
- In office 1985 - 1989
- Preceded by: Tripurana Venkata Ratnam
- Succeeded by: Tankala Saraswathamma
- Constituency: Cheepurupalli Assembly constituency

Member of Parliament, Lok Sabha
- In office 1989 - 1991
- Preceded by: Poosapati Ananda Gajapati Raju
- Succeeded by: Poosapati Ananda Gajapati Raju
- Constituency: Bobbili

Personal details
- Born: 12 October 1949 Purli, Srikakulam district, Madras Province, India
- Died: 8 August 2024 (aged 74) Visakhapatnam, Andhra Pradesh, India
- Party: Telugu Desam Party
- Other political affiliations: Telugu Desam Party
- Spouse: Rushi
- Children: 2

Kemburi Ramamohan Rao (12 October 1949 – 8 August 2024) was an Indian politician.

== Life and career ==
Rao was elected to the 9th Lok Sabha from Bobbili constituency in 1989 as a member of Telugu Desam Party.

Rao was born at Purli of Srikakulam district, Andhra Pradesh on 12 October 1949. He studied at Andhra University, Visakhapatnam.

Rao married Rushi in 1974 and had two daughters.

Rao was also member of Andhra Pradesh Legislative Assembly. He was elected from Cheepurupalli constituency in 1985 and held the office till 1989.

Rao died in Visakhapatnam, Andhra Pradesh on 8 August 2024, at the age of 74.
