= Gorlepeta =

- Village
- Country: India
- State: Andhra Pradesh
- District: Srikakulam

Government
  - Body: Local Self Government

Languages
  - Official: Telugu
- Time zone: UTC+5:30 (IST)
- PIN: 532407

Gorlepeta is a village in Srikakulam district of the Indian state of Andhra Pradesh. It is located in Ranastalam mandal, near the coast of the Bay of Bengal. It comes under Krishnapuram Gram Panchayat.
