= Kimidi Mrunalini =

Indian politician

- Born: 1958 (age 67–68); Cheepurupalli
- Occupation: Politician
- Political party: Telugu Desam Party
- Spouse: Kimidi Ganapathi Rao

Kimidi Mrunalini (born 5 March 1958) is an Indian politician from Andhra Pradesh who won the 2014 Andhra Pradesh Legislative Assembly election from Cheepurupalli Constituency in Vizianagaram district on TDP ticket.

== Personal life ==
Mrunalini is from Cheepurupalli. She married Kimidi Ganapathi Rao, also a politician and former MLA. Her brother-in-law Kimidi Kala Venkata Rao and her son Nagarjuna, are also in politics.

== Career ==
Mrunalini won for the first time as MLA in 2014 from Cheepurupalli Assembly constituency defeating senior Congress leader Botsa Satyanarayana by a margin of 20,842 votes. She was also the Rural Development Minister in the Telugu Desam government from 2014 but was dropped in April 2017 while her brother-in-law Kimidi Kala Venkata Rao was inducted as a minister. She was a former Vizianagaram Zilla Parishad chairperson.
