= Purli =

Coordinates: 18°51′N 76°32′E

- Village
- Interactive map of Purli
- Country: India
- State: Andhra Pradesh
- District: Vizianagaram

Languages
  - Official: Telugu
- Time zone: UTC+5:30 (IST)
- PIN: 532440

Purli is a village in Regidi Amadalavalasa mandal of Vizianagaram district, Andhra Pradesh, India.

== Notable people ==
- Kemburi Ramamohan Rao, a member of the legislative assembly, was born in the village
