= Appalanaidu Kalisetti =

Indian politician

Member of Parliament, Lok Sabha
- Incumbent
- Assumed office 4 June 2024
- Preceded by: Bellana Chandra Sekhar
- Constituency: Vizianagaram, Andhra Pradesh

Personal details
- Party: Telugu Desam Party
- Occupation: Politician

Appalanaidu Kalisetti is an Indian politician and the elected candidate for Lok Sabha from Vizianagaram Lok Sabha constituency. He is a member of the Telugu Desam Party.

== See also ==
- 18th Lok Sabha
