= Kolagatla Veerabhadra Swamy =

Indian politician

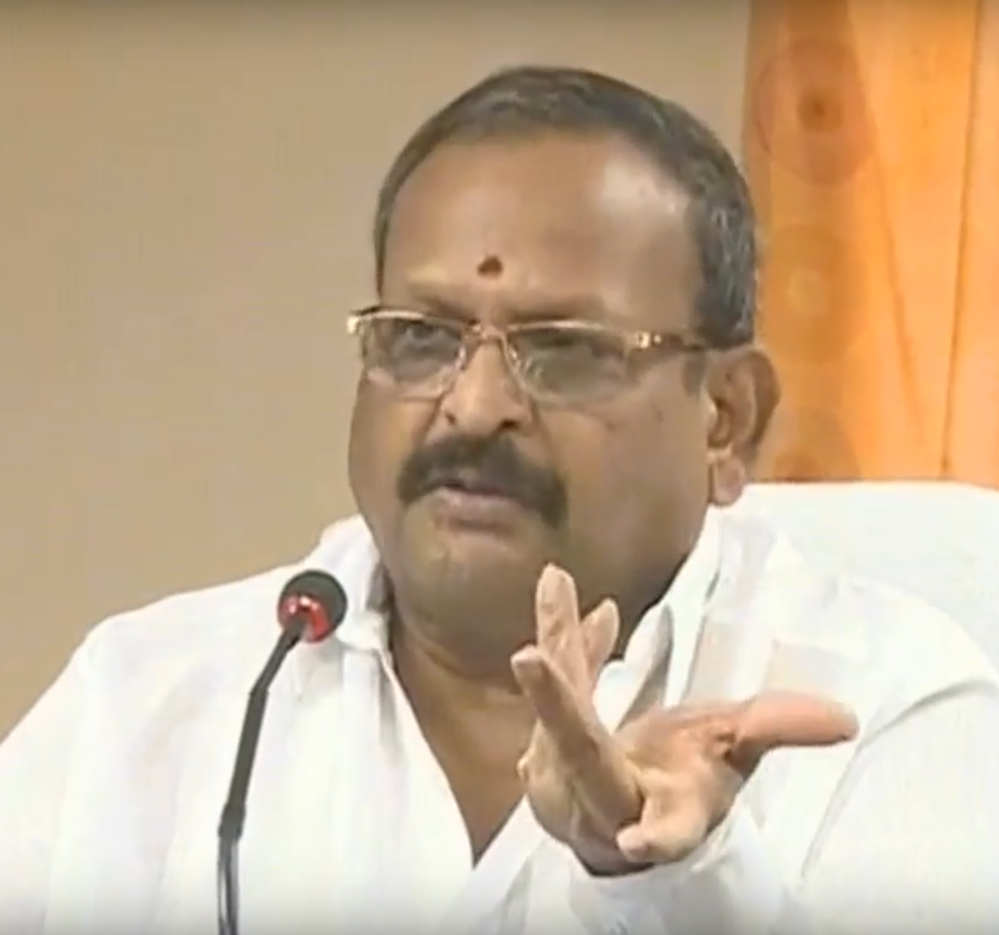

22nd Deputy Speaker of the Andhra Pradesh Legislative Assembly
- In office 19 September 2022 – 04 June 2024
- Governor: Biswabhusan Harichandan; S. Abdul Nazeer
- Speaker: Tammineni Sitaram
- Leader of the House: Y. S. Jagan Mohan Reddy
- Preceded by: Kona Raghupathi
- Succeeded by: Raghu Rama Krishna Raju

Member of Andhra Pradesh Legislative Assembly
- In office 2019–2024
- Preceded by: Meesala Geetha
- Succeeded by: Pusapati Aditi Vijayalakshmi
- Constituency: Vizianagaram
- In office 2004–2009
- Preceded by: Pusapati Ashok Gajapathi Raju
- Succeeded by: Pusapati Ashok Gajapathi Raju
- Constituency: Vizianagaram

Member of Andhra Pradesh Legislative Council
- In office 30 March 2015 – 6 June 2019
- Chairman: A. Chakrapani; N. M. D. Farooq; Shariff Mohammed Ahmed
- Leader of the House: N. Chandrababu Naidu
- Succeeded by: Shaik Mohammed Iqbal
- Constituency: Elected by MLAs
- In office 30 March 2013 – 21 May 2014
- Chairman: A. Chakrapani
- Leader of the House: Kiran Kumar Reddy
- Succeeded by: Ponguru Narayana
- Constituency: Elected by MLAs

Personal details
- Party: YSR Congress Party (2014 - present)
- Other political affiliations: Indian National Congress

Kolagatla Veerabhadra Swamy is an Indian politician from the YSR Congress Party. He is a Former Deputy Speaker of the Andhra Pradesh Legislative Assembly & member of the Andhra Pradesh Legislative Assembly from Vizianagaram Assembly constituency 2019 and also served from 2004 to 2009. He was elected as Deputy Speaker in the Assembly on 19 September 2022.
