= Karri Narayana Rao =

Indian politician (1929–2002)

Member of Parliament
- In office 1967–1977
- Succeeded by: P. V. G. Raju
- Constituency: Bobbili

Personal details
- Born: 1 July 1929 Santa Narisipuram, Srikakulam district
- Died: 2 March 2002 (aged 72) Nadukuru village, Srikakulam district
- Party: Indian National Congress
- Spouse: Saraswati
- Children: Vijaya Kumar(affectionative son)

Karri Narayana Rao (born 1 July 1929 – 2 March 2022), better known as K. Narayana Rao was an Indian lawyer and parliament member. He was elected to the 4th and 5th Lok Sabha from Bobbili constituency and held the office from 1967 to 1977.

== Early life and education ==
Rao was born at Santa Narasipuram of Srikakulam district. He did his MA at Andhra University, Waltair, and ML at Madras University. He also studied at Indian School of International Studies, New Delhi.

== Career ==
Rao won from Bobbili Lok Sabha constituency representing the Indian National Congress in the 1967 Indian general election in Andhra Pradesh and retained the seat for the Congress in the 1971 election. In 1967, he polled 350,963 votes and won by a margin of 75,197 votes. In 1971, he polled 274,000 votes and won by a margin of 182,169 votes.

Rao was in Government Service (Law Commission of India) prior to entering politics. He has worked as Senior Research Officer in the Indian Law Institute, New Delhi between 1959 and 1963. He was Junior Law Officer in the Law Commission, New Delhi between 1963 and 1967 and as Vice-President Indian Society of International Law, New Delhi. He was also a member of Andhra Pradesh State Transport Authority. He was the chairman of the Committee on Offices of Profit.
