= Etcherla Assembly constituency =

Constituency of the Andhra Pradesh Legislative Assembly, India

Coordinates: 18.28°N 83.82°E

Etcherla
- Constituency No. 7 for the Andhra Pradesh Legislative Assembly
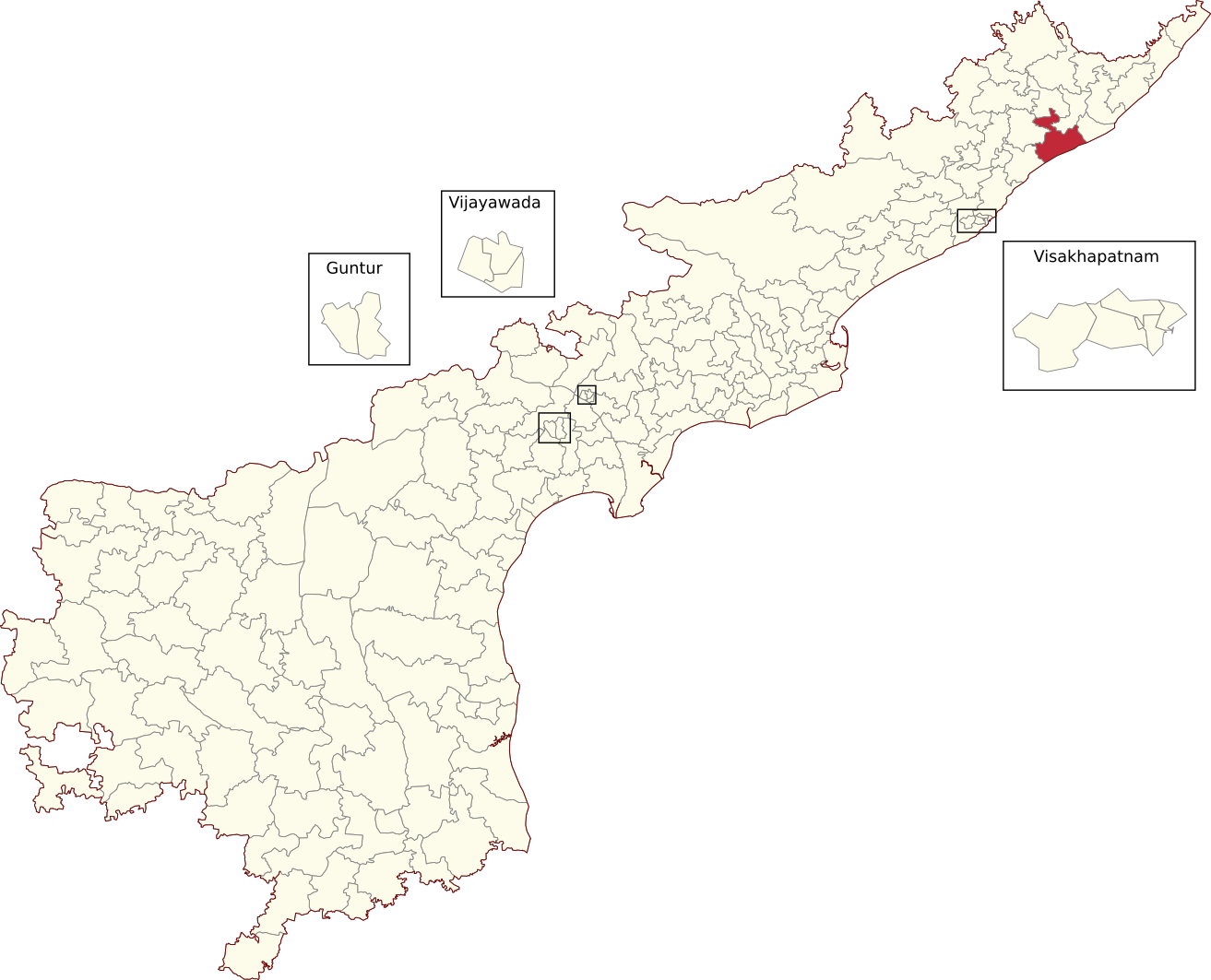
- Location of Etcherla Assembly constituency within Andhra Pradesh

Constituency details
- Country: India
- Region: South India
- State: Andhra Pradesh
- District: Srikakulam
- Lok Sabha constituency: Vizianagaram
- Established: 1967
- Total electors: 231,279
- Reservation: None

Member of Legislative Assembly
- 16th Andhra Pradesh Legislative Assembly
- Incumbent Nadukuditi Eswara Rao
- Party: BJP
- Alliance: NDA
- Elected year: 2024

Etcherla Assembly constituency is a constituency in Srikakulam district of Andhra Pradesh that elects representatives to the Andhra Pradesh Legislative Assembly in India. It is one of the seven assembly segments of Vizianagaram Lok Sabha constituency.

Nadukuditi Eswara Rao is the current MLA of the constituency, having won the 2024 Andhra Pradesh Legislative Assembly election from Bharatiya Janta Party. As of 2019, there are a total of 231,279 electors in the constituency. The constituency was established in 1967, as per the Delimitation Orders (1967).

== Mandals ==
The four mandals that form the assembly constituency are:

Mandal
Etcherla
Laveru
Ranasthalam
G.Sigadam

Mandals in Etcherla Assembly Constituency

== Members of the Legislative Assembly ==
Year	Member	Political Party
1967	N. A. Naidu	Indian National Congress
1972	Balllada Hariappala Reddy	Independent
1978	Kothapalli Narasayya	Janata Party
1983	K. Pratibha Bharati	Telugu Desam Party
1985	K. Pratibha Bharati	Telugu Desam Party
1989	K. Pratibha Bharati	Telugu Desam Party
1994	K. Pratibha Bharati	Telugu Desam Party
1999	K. Pratibha Bharati	Telugu Desam Party
2004	Kondru Murali Mohan	Indian National Congress
2009	Meesala Neelakantam	Indian National Congress
2014	Kimidi Kalavenkata Rao	Telugu Desam Party
2019	Gorle Kiran Kumar	YSR Congress Party
2024	Nadukuditi Eswara Rao	Bharatiya Janata Party

== Election results ==
=== 2024 ===
2024 Andhra Pradesh Legislative Assembly election: Etcherla
Party	Candidate	Votes	%	±%
BJP	Nadukuditi Eswara Rao	112,770	54.59	
YSRCP	Gorle Kiran Kumar	83,681	40.51	
NOTA	None of the Above	3,952	1.91	
INC	Karimajji Malleswara Rao	2,452	1.19	
BSP	Gantlana Ramarao	884	0.43	
Majority		29,089	14.08	
Turnout		206,562	84.07	
BJP gain from YSRCP		Swing		

=== 2019 ===
2019 Andhra Pradesh Legislative Assembly election: Etcherla
Party	Candidate	Votes	%	±%
YSRCP	Gorle Kiran Kumar	99,672	51.02	
TDP	Kimidi Kalavenkata Rao	80,961	41.44	
JSP	Badana Venkata Janardhana Rao	5,068	2.59	
NOTA	None of the Above	4,628	2.37	
INC	Kottakotla Simhadri Naidu	2,135	1.09	
BJP	Rokkam Suryaprakash Rao	1,022	0.52	
Majority		18,711	9.58	
Turnout		195,372	84.19	
YSRCP gain from TDP		Swing		

=== 2014 ===
2014 Andhra Pradesh Legislative Assembly election: Etcherla
Party	Candidate	Votes	%	±%
TDP	Kimidi Kalavenkata Rao	85,769	49.29	
YSRCP	Gorle Kiran Kumar	81,028	46.57	
INC	Ravikiran Kilari	2,148	1.23	
LSP	Amminaidu Paidi	1,344	0.77	
BSP	Gudivada Kuppayya	1,023	0.59	
NOTA	None of the Above	854	0.49	
Majority		4,741	2.72	
Turnout		174,001	82.70	
TDP gain from INC		Swing		

=== 1967 ===
1967 Andhra Pradesh Legislative Assembly election: Etcherla
Party	Candidate	Votes	%	±%
INC	N. A. Naidu	20,802	45.68	
Independent	Ballada Hariyappadu	17,904	39.31	
ABJS	G. Sanyasilingam	3,458	7.59	
Independent	D. S. A. V. Raju	3,377	7.42	
Majority		2,898	3.37	
Turnout		45,541	69.44	
INC win (new seat)				

=== 1972 ===
1972 Andhra Pradesh Legislative Assembly election: Etcherla
Party	Candidate	Votes	%	±%
Independent	Ballada Hariyappadu	36,013	70.08	▲30.77
INC	A. Nadminiti	15,377	29.92	▼15.76
Majority		20,636	40.16	▲33.79
Turnout		51,390	64.35	▼5.09
Independent gain from INC		Swing		

=== 1978 ===
1978 Andhra Pradesh Legislative Assembly election: Etcherla
Party	Candidate	Votes	%	±%
JP	Kothapalli Narasayya	25,272	46.8	
INC	Boddepalli Narasimhulu	15,481	28.7	▼1.22
INC	Kanchayya Potnuru	8,651	16.0	▼13.92
Independent	Manda Venkatrao	4,017	7.4	New
Independent	Makayya Koppala	557	1.0	New
Majority		9,791	17.3	▼22.86
Turnout		56,487	65.6	▲1.25
JP gain from Independent		Swing		

=== 1983 ===
1983 Andhra Pradesh Legislative Assembly election: Etcherla
Party	Candidate	Votes	%	±%
TDP	Kavali Bharathi	40,894	66.9	
INC	Yamala Narayana	15,832	25.9	▼18.8
Independent	Boddepalli Narasimhulu	3,102	5.1	▼23.6
Independent	Sirla Rao	1,290	2.1	
Majority		25,062	39.5	▲22.2
Turnout		63,518	70.4	▲4.8
TDP gain from JP		Swing		

=== 1985 ===
1985 Andhra Pradesh Legislative Assembly election: Etcherla
Party	Candidate	Votes	%	±%
TDP	Kavali Bharathi	43,191	70.9	▲4
INC	Vijayalaxmi Chappidi	16,244	26.7	▲0.9
Independent	Gudivada Apparao	1,515	2.5	
Majority		26,947	42.8	▲3.3
Turnout		62,926	63.5	▼6.9
TDP hold		Swing		

=== 1989 ===
1989 Andhra Pradesh Legislative Assembly election: Etcherla
Party	Candidate	Votes	%	±%
TDP	Kavali Bharathi	46,883	59.0	▼11.9
INC	Boddepalli Narasimhulu	28,302	35.6	▲8.9
Independent	Chiviki Asirappadu	2,356	3.0	
Independent	Netala Viswanadham	1,047	1.3	
Independent	Dannana Venkyya	481	0.6	
LKD	Gudivada Apparao	404	0.5	New
Majority		15,581	21.4	▼21.4
Turnout		86,840	70.3	▲6.8
TDP hold		Swing		

=== 1994 ===
1994 Andhra Pradesh Legislative Assembly election: Etcherla
Party	Candidate	Votes	%	±%
TDP	Kavali Bharathi	59,934	64.7	▲5.7
INC	Jampu Latchayya	29,179	31.5	▼4.1
BJP	Garbhapu Kumar	2,157	2.3	
BSP	Kallepalli Papayya	1,412	1.5	
Majority		30,755	31.9	▲10.5
Turnout		96,365	73.4	▲3.1
TDP hold		Swing		

=== 1999 ===
1999 Andhra Pradesh Legislative Assembly election: Etcherla
Party	Candidate	Votes	%	±%
TDP	Kavali Bharathi	54,162	55.1	▼9.6
INC	Kondru Mohan	43,372	44.1	▲12.6
Ajeya Bharat Party	Kadithi Appalaraju	856	0.9	
Majority		10,790	10.5	▼21.4
Turnout		102,466	70.4	▼3
TDP hold		Swing		

=== 2004 ===
2004 Andhra Pradesh Legislative Assembly election: Etcherla
Party	Candidate	Votes	%	±%
INC	Kondru Murali Mohan	58,676	52.6	▲8.5
TDP	Kavalipratibha Bharathi	52,987	47.5	▼7.6
Majority		5,689	5.1	▼5.4
Turnout		1,11,640	76.7	▲6.3
INC gain from TDP		Swing	▲8.05	

=== 2009 ===
2009 Andhra Pradesh Legislative Assembly election: Etcherla
Party	Candidate	Votes	%	±%
INC	Meesala Neelakantam	59,365	39.1	▼13.5
TDP	Nayana Suryanarayana Reddy	44,350	29.2	▼18.3
PRP	Kimidi Kala Venkat Rao	29,957	19.7	New
Independent	Gorle Haribabunaidu	6,893	4.5	New
LSP	Appalanaidu Gurugubilli	3,287	2.2	New
BJP	Paidi Venugopalam	3,037	2.0	New
RJD	Appararao Dabbada	2,612	1.7	New
BSP	Gudivada Kuppayya	2,300	1.5	New
Majority		15,015	9.9	▲4.8
Turnout		1,51,801	80.8	▲4.1
INC hold		Swing	▲2.4	

== See also ==
- List of constituencies of Andhra Pradesh Legislative Assembly
