= Nellimarla Assembly constituency =

Constituency of the Andhra Pradesh Legislative Assembly, India

Coordinates: 18.17°N 83.45°E

Nellimarla
- Constituency No. 17 for the Andhra Pradesh Legislative Assembly
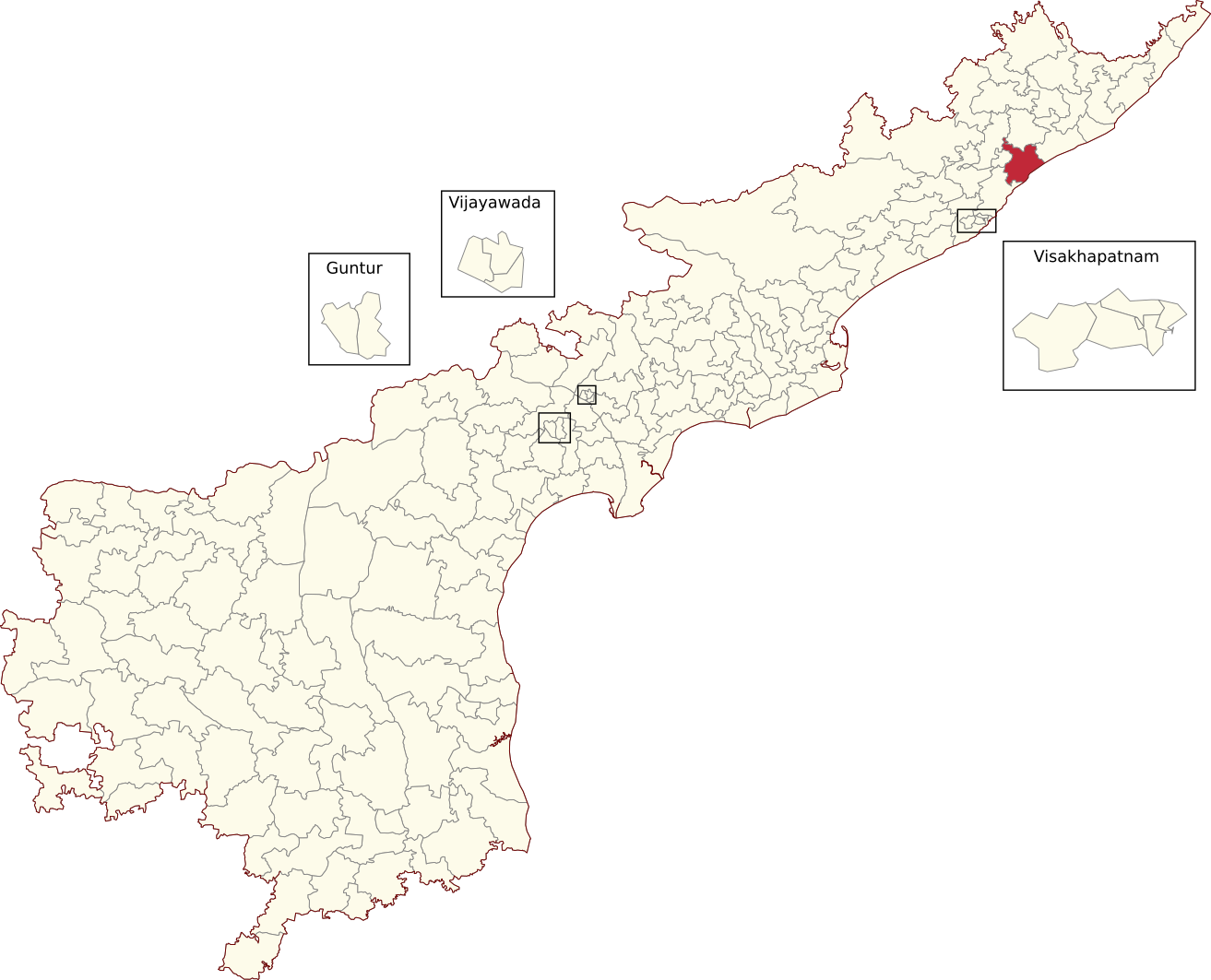
- Location of Nellimarla Assembly constituency within Andhra Pradesh

Constituency details
- Country: India
- Region: South India
- State: Andhra Pradesh
- District: Vizianagaram
- Lok Sabha constituency: Vizianagaram
- Established: 2008
- Total electors: 200,831
- Reservation: None

Member of Legislative Assembly
- 16th Andhra Pradesh Legislative Assembly
- Incumbent Lokam Naga Madhavi
- Party: JSP
- Elected year: 2024

Nellimarla Assembly constituency is a constituency in Vizianagaram district of Andhra Pradesh that elects representatives to the Andhra Pradesh Legislative Assembly in India. It is one of the seven assembly segments of the Vizianagaram Lok Sabha constituency.

Appala Naidu Baddukonda is the current MLA of the constituency, having won the 2019 Andhra Pradesh Legislative Assembly election from YSR Congress Party. As of 2019, there are a total of 200,831 electors in the constituency. The constituency was established in 2008, as per the Delimitation Orders (2008).

== Mandals ==
The four mandals that form the assembly constituency are:

Mandal
Nellimarla
Poosapatirega
Denkada
Bhogapuram

Mandals in Nellimarla Assembly Constituency

== Members of the Legislative Assembly ==
Year	Member	Political party
2009	Baddukonda Appala Naidu	Indian National Congress
2014	Pathivada Narayanaswamy Naidu	Telugu Desam Party
2019	Baddukonda Appala Naidu	YSR Congress Party
2024	Lokam Naga Madhavi	Jana Sena Party

== Election results ==
=== 2024 ===
2024 Andhra Pradesh Legislative Assembly election: Nellimarla
Party	Candidate	Votes	%	±%
JSP	Lokam Naga Madhavi	109,915	54.7%	
YSRCP	Appalanaidu Baddukonda	70,086	34.8%	
INC	Saragada Ramesh Kumar			
NOTA	None Of The Above			
Majority		39,829		
Turnout				
JSP gain from YSRCP		Swing		

=== 2019 ===
2019 Andhra Pradesh Legislative Assembly election: Nellimarla
Party	Candidate	Votes	%	±%
YSRCP	Appalanaidu Baddukonda	94,000		
TDP	Narayana Swamy Naidu Pathivada	66,207		
Majority		28,051		
Turnout				
YSRCP gain from TDP		Swing		

=== 2014 ===
2014 Andhra Pradesh Legislative Assembly election: Nellimarla
Party	Candidate	Votes	%	±%
TDP	Narayana Swamy Naidu Pathivada	71,267	42.88	
YSRCP	P. V. V. Suryanarayana Raju	64,294	38.69	
INC	Appalanaidu Baddukonda	23,884	14.37	
Majority		6,973	4.19	
Turnout		166,194	87.94	+4.23
TDP gain from INC		Swing		

=== 2009 ===
2009 Andhra Pradesh Legislative Assembly election: Nellimarla
Party	Candidate	Votes	%	±%
INC	Appalanaidu Baddukonda	48,155	32.59	−3.49
TDP	Narayana Swamy Naidu Pathivada	47,558	32.19	−11.00
PRP	Kandula Raghu Babu	43,537	30.62	−3.00
Majority		597	0.4	
Turnout		147,725	83.71	
INC win (new seat)				

== See also ==
- List of constituencies of the Andhra Pradesh Legislative Assembly
