= Vizianagaram Assembly constituency =

Constituency of the Andhra Pradesh Legislative Assembly, India

Coordinates: 18.11°N 83.39°E

Vizianagaram
- Constituency No. 18 for the Andhra Pradesh Legislative Assembly
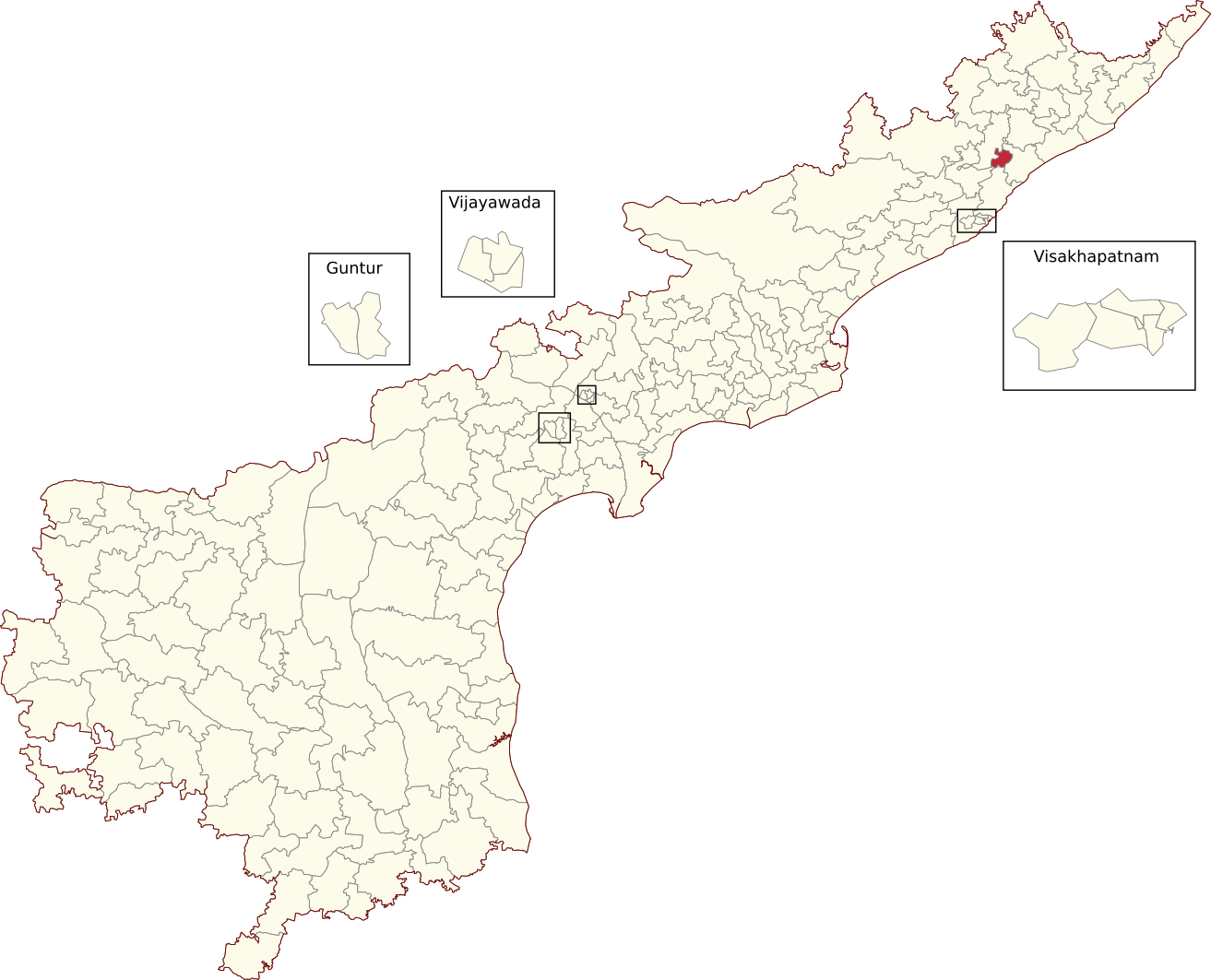
- Location of Vizianagaram Assembly constituency within Andhra Pradesh

Constituency details
- Country: India
- Region: South India
- State: Andhra Pradesh
- District: Vizianagaram
- Lok Sabha constituency: Vizianagaram
- Established: 1951
- Total electors: 231,554
- Reservation: None

Member of Legislative Assembly
- 16th Andhra Pradesh Legislative Assembly
- Incumbent Pusapati Aditi Vijayalakshmi
- Party: TDP
- Alliance: NDA
- Elected year: 2024

Vizianagaram Assembly constituency is a constituency in Vizianagaram district of Andhra Pradesh that elects representatives to the Andhra Pradesh Legislative Assembly in India. It is one of the seven assembly segments of Vizianagaram Lok Sabha constituency.

Pusapati Aditi Vijayalakshmi is the current MLA of the constituency, having won the 2024 Andhra Pradesh Legislative Assembly election from Telugu Desam Party. As of 2019, there are a total of 231,554 electors in the constituency. The constituency was established in 1951, as per the Delimitation Orders (1951).

== Mandals ==
Vizianagaram mandal is the only mandal that forms a part of the constituency.

Vizianagaram Assembly Constituency

Mandal
Vizianagaram

== Members of the Legislative Assembly ==
Year	Member	Political party
1952	Pusapati Vijayarama Gajapati Raju	Socialist Party
1955	Pusapati Vijayarama Gajapati Raju	Praja Socialist Party
1957^	Bhattam Srirama Murthy	Socialist Party
1962	Bhattam Srirama Murthy	Indian National Congress
1967	Vobbilisetty Rama Rao	Bharatiya Jana Sangh
1972	Appannadora Appasani	Indian National Congress
1978	Pusapati Ashok Gajapathi Raju	Janata Party
1983	Pusapati Ashok Gajapathi Raju	Telugu Desam Party
1985	Pusapati Ashok Gajapathi Raju	Telugu Desam Party
1989	Pusapati Ashok Gajapathi Raju	Telugu Desam Party
1994	Pusapati Ashok Gajapathi Raju	Telugu Desam Party
1999	Pusapati Ashok Gajapathi Raju	Telugu Desam Party
2004	Kolagatla Veerabhadra Swamy	Independent
2009	Pusapati Ashok Gajapathi Raju	Telugu Desam Party
2014	Meesala Geetha	Telugu Desam Party
2019	Kolagatla Veerabhadra Swamy	YSR Congress Party
2024	Pusapati Aditi Vijayalakshmi	Telugu Desam Party

^by-election

== Election results ==
=== 1952 ===
1952 Madras Legislative Assembly election: Vizianagaram
Party	Candidate	Votes	%	±%
Socialist Party (India)	Pusapati Vijayarama Gajapati Raju	52,548	39.20%	
Independent	Gudivada Appalaswamy	16,120	12.03%	
INC	Chinna Suryanarayana	9,117	6.80%	6.80%
KMPP	Sakati Guruwala	6,085	4.54%	
Margin of victory		2,377	1.77%	
Turnout		1,34,041	91.71%	
Registered electors		1,46,158		
Socialist Party (India) win (new seat)				

=== 1955 ===
1955 Andhra State Legislative Assembly election: Vizianagaram
Party	Candidate	Votes	%	±%
PSP	Pusapati Vijayarama Gajapati Raju	27,404	86.21	▲47.01
INC	Bhaganagarapu Rao	3,284	10.33	▲3.53
CPI	J.V. Lakshmi	1,101	3.46	
Majority		24,120	75.88	▲74.11
Turnout		31,789	53.45	▼38.26
PSP hold		Swing		

=== 1957 by-election ===
1957 Madras Legislative Assembly by-election: Vizianagaram
Party	Candidate	Votes	%	±%
Socialist Party (India)	B. Sriramamurty	Unopposed		
Socialist Party (India) gain from PSP		Swing		

=== 1962 ===
1962 Andhra Pradesh Legislative Assembly election: Vizianagaram
Party	Candidate	Votes	%	±%
INC	Bhattam Srirama Murthy	35,214	88.46	▲78.13
ABJS	Vobbillisetty Rama Rao	4,591	11.53	
Majority		30,623	76.93	▲1.05
Turnout		39,805		
INC gain from PSP		Swing		

=== 1967 ===
1967 Andhra Pradesh Legislative Assembly election: Vizianagaram
Party	Candidate	Votes	%	±%
ABJS	Vobbilisetty Rao	31,283	66.03	▲54.50
INC	Bhattam Srirama Murthy	12,924	27.28	▼61.18
Independent	R. V. Ramarao	2,471	5.22	
Independent	M. V. Seshachari	699	1.48	
Majority		18,359	38.75	▼38.18
Turnout		47,377	71.34	
ABJS gain from INC		Swing		

=== 1972 ===
1972 Andhra Pradesh Legislative Assembly election: Vizianagaram
Party	Candidate	Votes	%	±%
INC	Appannadora Appasani	34,319	78.47	▲51.19
ABJS	Prakasarao Anavilla	9,417	21.53	▼44.50
Majority		24,902	56.94	▲18.19
Turnout		43,736	56.05	▼15.29
INC gain from ABJS		Swing		

=== 1978 ===
1978 Andhra Pradesh Legislative Assembly election: Vizianagaram
Party	Candidate	Votes	%	±%
JP	Pusapati Ashok Gajapathi Raju	39,914	59.7	
INC	Appanadora Appasani	13,829	20.7	▼57.77
INC(I)	Modili Satyam	11,760	17.6	
Independent	Patchipilli Dasu	1,393	2.1	
Majority		26,085	38.0	▼18.94
Turnout		68,600	77.3	▲21.25
JP gain from INC		Swing		

=== 1983 ===
1983 Andhra Pradesh Legislative Assembly election: Vizianagaram
Party	Candidate	Votes	%	±%
TDP	Ashok Gajapathi Raju	53,018	77.9	▲18.2
INC	Prasadula Rama Krishna	12,626	18.6	▼2.1
Independent	Kalavathi Boddu	1,327	2.0	
Independent	Palli Rao	538	0.8	
Independent	Velugula Narasinga	337	0.5	
Independent	Pusapati Raju	179	0.3	
Majority		40,392	58.3	▲20.3
Turnout		69,323	66.6	▼10.7
TDP hold		Swing		

=== 1985 ===
1985 Andhra Pradesh Legislative Assembly election: Vizianagaram
Party	Candidate	Votes	%	±%
TDP	Ashok Gajapathi Raju	49,963	80.1	▲2.4
INC	Modili Srinivasa Rao	11,994	19.2	▲0.6
Independent	Gorli Raju	424	0.7	
Majority		37,969	59.7	▲1.4
Turnout		63,550	57.1	▼9.5
TDP hold		Swing		

=== 1989 ===
1989 Andhra Pradesh Legislative Assembly election: Vizianagaram
Party	Candidate	Votes	%	±%
TDP	Ashok Gajapathi Raju	50,224	55.4	▼24.7
INC	Kolagatla Veerabhadraswamy	40,477	44.6	▲25.4
Majority		9,747	10.4	▼49.3
Turnout		93,922	69.6	▼12.5
TDP hold		Swing		

=== 1994 ===
1994 Andhra Pradesh Legislative Assembly election: Vizianagaram
Party	Candidate	Votes	%	±%
TDP	Ashok Gajapathi Raju	60,893	58.9	▲3.5
INC	Kolagatla Veerabhadraswamy	39,682	38.6	▼6
BJP	Bobbadi Pydiraju	1,252	1.2	
Independent	Dodda Padmajayanthi	339	0.3	
BSP	Bhupati Apparao	320	0.3	
Independent	Alla Nookaraju	287	0.3	
Independent	Bandaru Satyanarayana	125	0.1	
Independent	Pathange Tulasiram	117	0.1	
Independent	Ellapu Venkatarao	108	0.1	
Independent	Suryanarayana Chintapalli	72	0.1	
Turnout		105,160	70.2	+0.6
TDP hold		Swing		

=== 1999 ===
1999 Andhra Pradesh Legislative Assembly election: Vizianagaram
Party	Candidate	Votes	%	±%
TDP	Ashok Gajapathi Raju	59,692	53.8	▼5.1
INC	Kolagatla Veerabhadra Swamy	50,261	43.5	▲4.9
Anna Telugu Desam Party	Allu Naidu	376	0.3	
RPI	Arjuna Konala	331	0.3	
BSP	Yerramsetty Ramana	215	0.2	▼1
Majority		9,431	8.3	▼11.7
Turnout		113,393	67.4	▼2.8
TDP hold		Swing		

=== 2004 ===
2004 Andhra Pradesh Legislative Assembly election: Vizianagaram
Party	Candidate	Votes	%	±%
Independent	Veera Bhadra Swamy Kolagatla	47,444	40.60	
TDP	Ashok Gajapathi Raju Pusapati	46,318	39.64	
INC	Gurana Sadhu Rao	19,861	17.00	
Majority		1,126	0.96	
Turnout		116,857	64.64	−1.23
Independent gain from TDP		Swing		

=== 2009 ===
2009 Andhra Pradesh Legislative Assembly election: Vizianagaram
Party	Candidate	Votes	%	±%
TDP	Ashok Gajapathi Raju Pusapati	52,890	38.18	
INC	Veera Bhadra Swamy Kolagatla	49,608	35.81	−
PRP	Geetha Meesala	28,341	20.46	
Majority		3,282	2.37	
Turnout		138,543	64.74	+0.10
TDP gain from Independent		Swing		

=== 2014 ===
2014 Andhra Pradesh Legislative Assembly election: Vizianagaram
Party	Candidate	Votes	%	±%
TDP	Geetha Meesala	77,320	49.82	
YSRCP	Veera Bhadra Swamy Kolagatla	61,916	39.89	
Majority		15,404	9.93	
Turnout		155,206	71.87	+7.13
TDP hold		Swing		

=== 2019 ===
2019 Andhra Pradesh Legislative Assembly election: Vizianagaram
Party	Candidate	Votes	%	±%
YSRCP	Veera Bhadra Swamy Kolagatla	78,849	47.96	
TDP	Aditi Vijayalakshmi Gajapathi Raju	72,432	44.05	
JSP	Palavalasa Yasasvi	7190	4.37	
Majority		6,400	4	−58.45
Turnout		1,62,623	70.09	−2.54
YSRCP gain from TDP		Swing		

=== 2024 ===
2024 Andhra Pradesh Legislative Assembly election: Vizianagaram
Party	Candidate	Votes	%	±%
TDP	Aditi Vijayalakshmi Gajapathi Raju	121,241	64.21	+40.26
YSRCP	Kolagatla Veerabhadra Swamy	60,632	32.11	−23.10
Independent	Geetha Meesala	2,054	1.09	
INC	Satish Kumar Sunkari	1,527	0.81	
NOTA	None Of The Above	1,365	0.72	
Majority		60,609	32.10	+847.02
Turnout		1,88,807	81.05	+13.89
TDP gain from YSRCP		Swing		

== See also ==
- List of constituencies of the Andhra Pradesh Legislative Assembly
