= Kimidi Kalavenkata Rao =

Indian politician

Member of Legislative Assembly, Andhra Pradesh
- Incumbent
- Assumed office 2024
- Preceded by: Botsa Satyanarayana
- Constituency: Cheepurupalli
- In office 2014–2019
- Preceded by: Meesala Neelakantam Naidu
- Succeeded by: Gorle Kiran Kumar
- Constituency: Etcherla
- In office 1983–1994
- Preceded by: Babu Parankusam Mudili
- Succeeded by: Palavalasa Rajasekharam
- Constituency: Vunukuru
- In office 2004–2009
- Preceded by: Kimidi Ganapathi Rao
- Succeeded by: Constituency abolished
- Constituency: Vunukuru

1st President of Telugu Desam Party, Andhra Pradesh unit
- In office 30 September 2015 – 20 October 2020
- National President: N. Chandrababu Naidu
- Preceded by: Position established
- Succeeded by: Kinjarapu Atchannaidu

Personal details
- Born: 1 July 1952 (age 74) Regadi, Srikakulam District
- Party: Telugu Desam Party
- Spouse: Chandramouli
- Parent(s): Surau Naidu (Father); Annapurnamma (Mother)
- Education: Maharaja College, Vizianagaram
- Occupation: Agriculture, Politician

Kimidi Kalavenkata Rao is an Indian politician and Telugu Desam Party leader. He was appointed President of the Andhra Pradesh Division of the Telugu Desam Party after the partition of Andhra Pradesh.

== Political Life ==
- Rao joined the Telugu Desam Party in 1983 with the formation of the party. In the 1983, 1985, 1989 and 2004 elections, he won the Unukuru Assembly constituency four times as an MLA on behalf of the Telugu Desam Party. He served as the Minister of Trade Taxes, Municipalities and Home Affairs in the Governments of Telugu Desam.
- Rao served as the Chairman of the Tirumala Tirupati Devasthanam-TTD. He was a Member of the Rajya Sabha from 1998 to 2004.
- Rao joined the Chiranjeevi-led Praja Rajyam Party in the 2009 Assembly elections. When Unukuru constituency was merged with other constituencies in 2009, he contested as a Prajarajyam Party candidate from Echerla Assembly constituency and lost to Congress candidate Meesala Neelakantam Naidu. Though he wanted to come back to Telugudesam party, he could not come due to some reasons. He has not left the Prajarajyam Party since 2012 and has not been active in any political party for 2 years.
- In the 2014 Assembly elections, he contested and won as Telugu Desam Party candidate from Etcherla Assembly constituency again.

== Positions held ==
- Municipal Departments, Government of Andhra Pradesh.
- Department of Commercial Taxes, Government of Andhra Pradesh.
- Home Department, Government of Andhra Pradesh.
- Member of the Rajya Sabha.
- Department of Energy Resources, Government of Andhra Pradesh.
