= Baddukonda Appala Naidu =

Indian politician

Baddukonda Appala Naidu (born 1975), alternatively Baddukonda Appalanaidu, is an Andhra Pradesh politician and YSR Congress Party leader.

== Personal life ==
Naidu was born in 1975 at Mopada village in Denkada Mandal, Vizianagaram district. He is a relative of Andhra Pradesh state minister Botsa Satyanarayana.

== Political life ==
Naidu was represented as the Chairman of Vizianagaram Zilla Parishad during 2007–2009. He Represented Nellimarla (Assembly constituency) as a legislator in 2009 as the Indian National Congress Party candidate. In 2014, he lost to Telugu Desam Party candidate Pathivada Narayanaswamy Naidu. In 2019, he was elected second-time legislator from the Nellimarla (Assembly constituency) as a YSR Congress Party party candidate.
