= Pusapati Aditi Vijayalakshmi =

Indian politician

Member of the Andhra Pradesh Legislative Assembly
- Incumbent
- Assumed office 2024
- Preceded by: Kolagatla Veerabhadra Swamy
- Constituency: Vizianagaram

Personal details
- Born: 1983 (age 42–43)
- Party: Telugu Desam Party
- Parent: Ashok Gajapathi Raju (father)

Pusapati Aditi Vijayalakshmi Gajapathi Raju (born 1983) is an Indian politician from Andhra Pradesh. She is a first-time member of the Andhra Pradesh Legislative Assembly from Vizianagaram Assembly constituency in Vizianagaram district. She represents the Telugu Desam Party. She won the 2024 Andhra Pradesh Legislative Assembly election.

== Early life and education ==
Aditi is from the royal family of Vizianagaram. She is the daughter of former central minister Ashok Gajapathi Raju, a maharaja of Vizianagaram. She completed her MA in psychology in 2013 from Andhra University, Visakhapatnam.

== Career ==
Aditi made her electoral debut in 2019 but was elected as an MLA for the first time winning the 2024 Andhra Pradesh Legislative Assembly election. She polled 121,241 votes and defeated her nearest rival and former deputy assembly speaker Kolagatla Veerabhadra Swamy of YSR Congress Party, by a margin of 60,609 votes. Earlier in 2019 Andhra Pradesh Legislative Assembly election, she contested from Vizianagaram seat, also on the Telugu Desam Party ticket, but polled 72,432 votes and lost to Veerabhadra Swamy of the YSR Congress Party, by a margin of 6,417 votes. Though the constituency is a traditional stronghold of the maharajas, 2019 witnessed a wave in favour of YSR Congress Party.
