= Ashok Gajapathi Raju =

Indian politician (born 1951)

Pusapati Ashok Gajapathi Raju
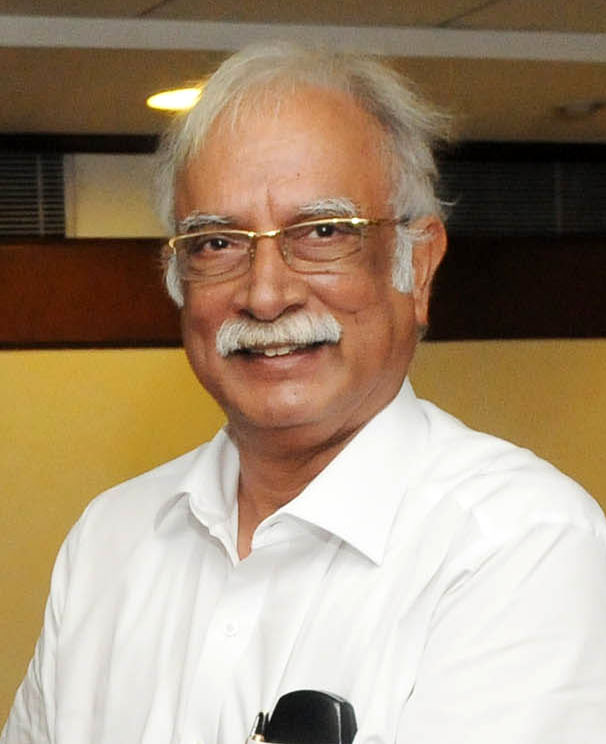
- Raju in July 2016

Governor of Goa
- Incumbent
- Assumed office 26 July 2025
- Chief Minister: Pramod Sawant
- Preceded by: P. S. Sreedharan Pillai

29th Union Minister of Civil Aviation
- In office 26 May 2014 – 9 March 2018
- Prime Minister: Narendra Modi
- Preceded by: Ajit Singh
- Succeeded by: Suresh Prabhu

Member of Parliament, Lok Sabha
- In office 16 May 2014 – 23 May 2019
- Preceded by: Botcha Jhansi Lakshmi
- Succeeded by: Bellana Chandra Sekhar
- Constituency: Vizianagaram, Andhra Pradesh

Minister for Revenue, Relief and Rehabilitation in Andhra Pradesh
- In office 11 October 1999 – 14 May 2004
- Governor: Krishan Kant; C. Rangarajan; Surjit Singh Barnala
- Chief Minister: N. Chandrababu Naidu
- Succeeded by: Konathala Ramakrishna

Minister of Finance and Legislative Affairs in Andhra Pradesh
- In office 1 September 1995 – 10 October 1999
- Governor: Krishan Kant; C. Rangarajan
- Chief Minister: N. Chandrababu Naidu

Minister of Commercial Taxes and Legislative Affairs in Andhra Pradesh
- In office 12 December 1994 – 31 August 1995
- Governor: Krishan Kant
- Chief Minister: N. T. Rama Rao

Minister of Excise in Andhra Pradesh
- In office 9 March 1985 – 2 December 1989
- Chief Minister: N. T. Rama Rao

Minister of Commercial Taxes in Andhra Pradesh
- In office 1983–1985
- Chief Minister: N. T. Rama Rao

Member of Andhra Pradesh Legislative Assembly
- In office 19 May 2009 – 28 March 2014
- Preceded by: Kolagatla Veerabhadra Swamy
- Succeeded by: Meesala Geetha
- Constituency: Vizianagaram
- In office 5 March 1978 – 14 November 2003
- Preceded by: Appannadora Appasani
- Succeeded by: Kolagatla Veerabhadra Swamy
- Constituency: Vizianagaram

Personal details
- Born: 26 June 1951 (age 75) Madras, Madras State, India (present-day Chennai, Tamil Nadu)
- Party: Telugu Desam Party
- Children: 2 (including Pusapati Aditi Vijayalakshmi)
- Education: Hyderabad Public School
- Website: http://ashokgajapathiraju.com

Pusapati Ashok Gajapathi Raju (born 26 June 1951) is an Indian politician who is currently serving as the governor of Goa since 26 July 2025 and the former Union Minister for Civil Aviation. A scion of royal family of Vizianagaram princely state, he is the younger son of the last Maharaja of Vizianagaram. He was appointed as governor of Goa by president of India on 14 July 2025 He was a member of Andhra Pradesh State legislature for over twenty five years and was a state minister, for thirteen years holding the portfolios of Commercial Taxes, Excise, Legislative affairs, Finance, Revenue, Relief and Rehabilitation.

== Personal life ==
Pusapati Ashok Gajapathi Raju comes from the Pusapati royal family of the Vizianagaram estate. He is the son of Maharaja Pusapati Vijayarama Gajapathi Raju, the last Maharaja of Vizianagram. His family is known for its philanthropy through its temples that include the famous Simhachalam temple and the Maharaja Alak Narayana Society for Arts and Sciences which runs a number of education institutions.

Raju was educated at Scindia School Gwalior, Hyderabad Public School and V.S. Krishna College, Visakhapatnam.

His father Pusapati Vijayarama Gajapati Raju and his brother Pusapati Ananda Gajapathi Raju were also Indian parliamentarians and ministers in the state government.

Raju is a former president of Andhra Cricket Association. His efforts resulted in the establishment of several centres for imparting training in several sports at many places including Hyderabad, Visakhapatnam and Vizianagaram.

He is from royal Pusapati family of Andhra Pradesh and is the 11th custodian of his family.

Raju married Suneela in 1974 and has two daughters, one of whom is Pusapati Aditi Vijayalakshmi, the MLA from Vizianagaram Assembly constituency.

== Political career ==
Raju won the Vizianagaram Legislative Assembly constituency for the first time as Janata Party candidate in 1978. He joined the Telugu Desam Party when it was formed in 1982 and won the state assembly elections of 1983, 1985, 1989, 1994, 1999 and 2009. He won the 2014 Indian general election to the 16th Lok Sabha from Vizianagaram. He served Andhra Pradesh as a cabinet minister for Excise, Commercial Taxes, Finance, Revenue and Legislative Affairs in State Government. He is a Politburo member in the Telugu Desam Party. He was the Union minister for Civil Aviation in the National Democratic Alliance cabinet.

He resigned on 8 March 2018 over a dispute with central government to provide special status to Andhra Pradesh.

== Goa governorship ==
On July 14, 2025, Raju was appointed as the governor of Goa, with his swearing-in scheduled for July 26. He officially resigned from the TDP to take up the post, and expressed gratitude to the party leadership for the opportunity to serve.

== Other work ==
Raju took an active part in the struggle for the formation of a new district, Vizianagaram. His interest in improving education in the district led to the establishment of several governmental and non-governmental educational institutions. He served as chairman of the Maharaja Alak Narayana Society of Arts and Science (MANSAS), which runs twelve educational institutions in the district. As a minister, he was associated with several developmental activities. He is keenly interested in the field of public health and the conservation of water and electricity. In pursuance of this ideal, he launched housing, drinking water and health schemes. He has traveled abroad to study town planning and to implement it suitably in Andhra Pradesh.

Lok Sabha
Preceded by Botsa Jhansi Lakshmi	Member of Parliament for Vizianagaram; 2014 – 2019	Succeeded by Bellana Chandra Sekhar
Political offices
Preceded by Ajit Singh	Minister of Civil Aviation; 26 May 2014 – 8 March 2018	Succeeded by Suresh Prabhu
Preceded by P. S. Sreedharan Pillai	Governor of Goa; 26 July 2025 – Present	Incumbent
