= Kondapalli Appala Naidu =

Indian politician

Kondapalli Appala Naidu / Kondapalli Appalanaidu, also known as 'K.A. Naidu', is an Andhra Pradesh politician and leader of Telugu Desam Party.

== Personal life ==
Naidu was born at Gantyada village and mandal in Vizianagaram district in 1967 to agricultural family Kondapalli Pydithalli Naidu and Appayyamma. His father was represented thrice as Member of Parliament.

== Political life ==
Dr.kondapalli appalanaidu also called as Dr.K.A.Naidu was Contested as MP From Bobbili Lok Sabha constituency parliament in bye election of 2006, contested as Vizianagaram Lok Sabha constituency MP for 2009, both times he lost with less margin. From 2009 he was incharge for Vizianagaram Lok Sabha constituency and also Cheepurupalli (Assembly constituency). Later he won as MLA from Gajapathinagaram (Assembly constituency) in Vijayanagaram district in 2014. In 2019, he lost to Botsa Appala Narasayya of the YSRCP party. He is currently holding Gajapathinagaram (Assembly constituency) telugudesam party incharge and also Parliament coordinator (observer) for Guntur Lok Sabha constituency and Machilipatnam Lok Sabha constituency on behalf of the Telugu Desam Party. From 1982 his family supporting Telugu Desam Party only. It was his strength.
