= Lokam Naga Madhavi =

Indian politician

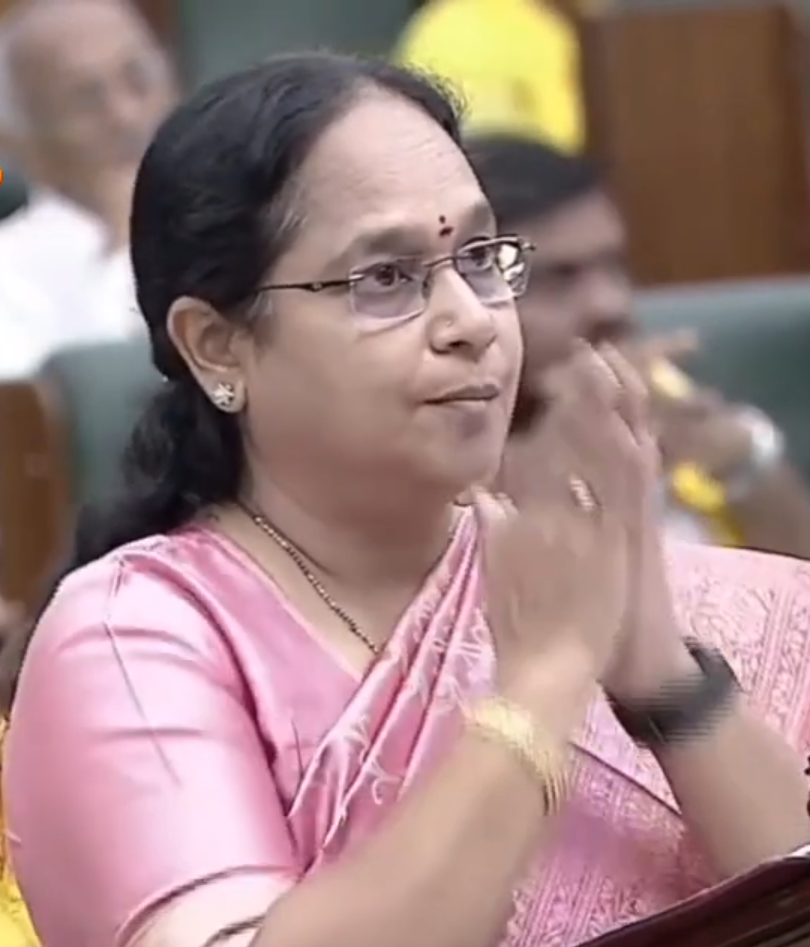

Member of the Andhra Pradesh Legislative Assembly
- Incumbent
- Assumed office 2024
- Preceded by: Appalanaidu Baddukonda
- Constituency: Nellimarla

Personal details
- Born: 1968 (age 57–58)
- Party: Janasena Party

Lokam Naga Madhavi (born August 28, 1968) is an Indian politician from Andhra Pradesh. She is a member of the Andhra Pradesh Legislative Assembly from Nellimarla Assembly constituency in Vizianagaram district. She represents Janasena Party. She won the 2024 Andhra Pradesh Legislative Assembly election.

== Early life and education ==
Madhavi lives in Nellimarla, Vizianagaram district. She married Lokam Venkata Nagendra Vara Prasad and together they have two sons, Chanakya and Nikhil. She runs her own business. She completed her MS in computer science in 1995 at Kent State University, USA. She served as vice president of Miracle Software Systems Inc. for over two decades.

== Political career ==
Madhavi won the 2024 Andhra Pradesh Legislative Assembly election from Nellimarla Assembly Constituency representing Janasena Party which entered into an alliance with Telugu Desam Party and BJP. She defeated Baddukonda Appalanaidu of YSR Congress Party by a margin of 39,829 votes. Earlier, she contested the 2019 Andhra Pradesh Legislative Assembly election representing Jana Sena Party from Nellimarla constituency which was won by Appalanaidu Baddukonda of the YSR Congress Party.
