= Gajapathinagaram Assembly constituency =

Constituency of the Andhra Pradesh Legislative Assembly, India

Coordinates: 18.28°N 83.33°E

Gajapathinagaram
- Constituency No. 16 for the Andhra Pradesh Legislative Assembly
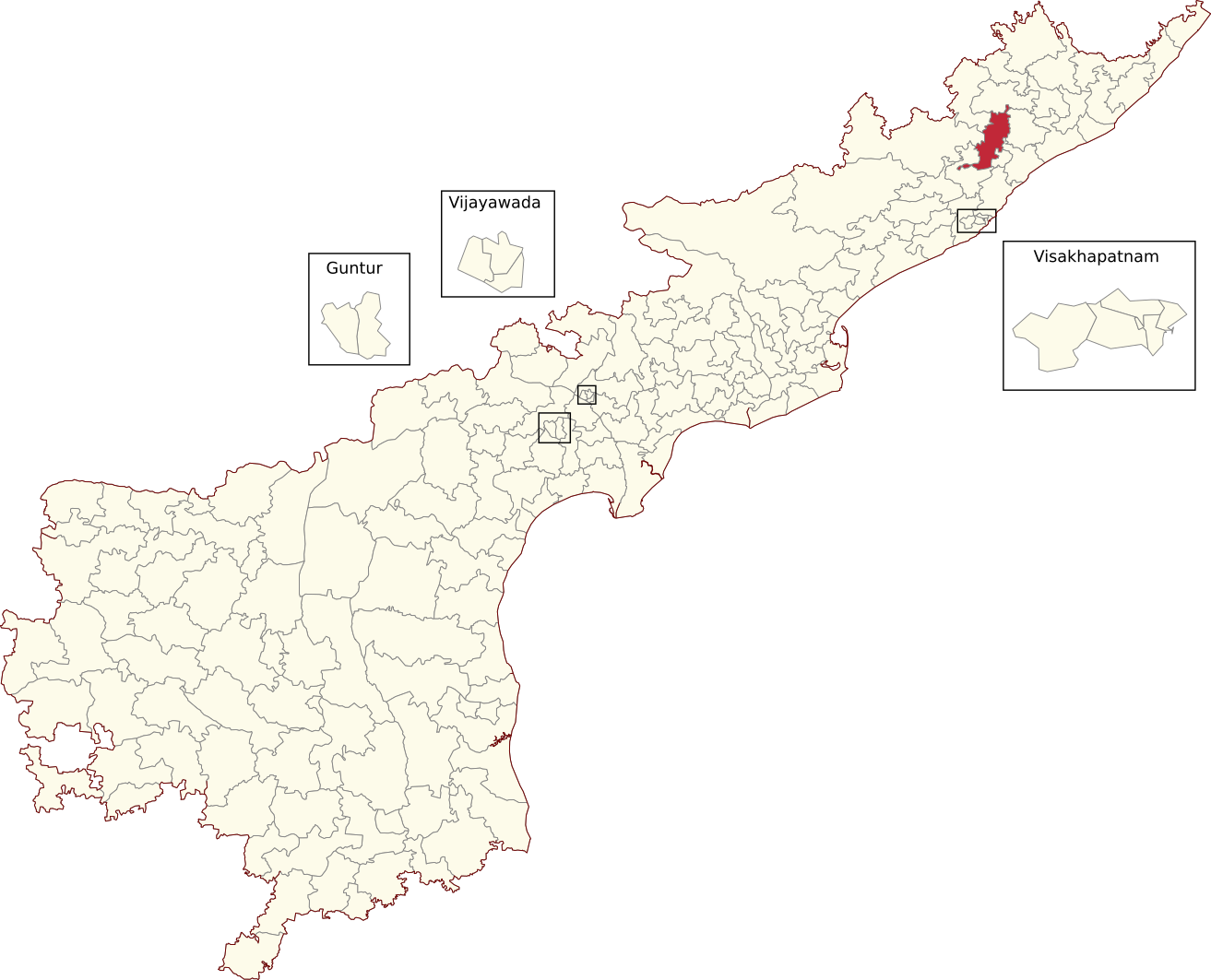
- Location of Gajapathinagaram Assembly constituency within Andhra Pradesh

Constituency details
- Country: India
- Region: South India
- State: Andhra Pradesh
- District: Vizianagaram
- Lok Sabha constituency: Vizianagaram
- Established: 1955
- Total electors: 197,474
- Reservation: None

Member of Legislative Assembly
- 16th Andhra Pradesh Legislative Assembly
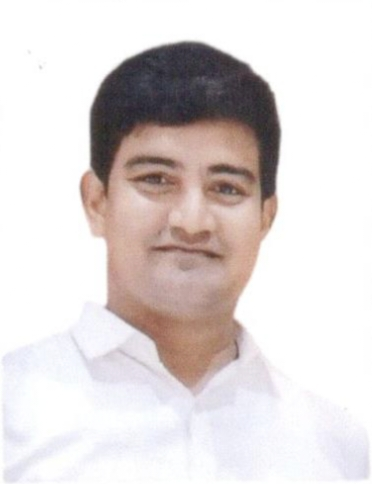
- Incumbent Kondapalli Srinivas
- Party: TDP
- Alliance: NDA
- Elected year: 2024

Gajapathinagaram Assembly constituency is a constituency in Vizianagaram district of Andhra Pradesh that elects representatives to the Andhra Pradesh Legislative Assembly in India. It is one of the seven assembly segments of Vizianagaram Lok Sabha constituency.

Kondapalli Srinivas is the current MLA of the constituency, having won the 2024 Andhra Pradesh Legislative Assembly election from Telugu Desam Party. As of 2019, there are a total of 197,474 electors in the constituency. The constituency was established in 1955, as per the Delimitation Orders (1955).

== Mandals ==
The five mandals that form the assembly constituency are:

Mandal
Gajapathinagaram
Bondapalli
Gantyada
Dattirajeru
Jami

== Members of the Legislative Assembly ==
Year	Member	Political party
1955	Kusum Gajapathiraju	Praja Socialist Party
1959 by-election	Taddi Sanayasi Naidu	Independent
1962	Taddi Sanayasi Naidu	Swatantra Party
1967	Penumatsa Sambasiva Raju	Independent
1972	Penumatsa Sambasiva Raju	Indian National Congress
1978	Vangapandu Narayanappala Naidu	Janata Party
1983	Jampana Satyanarayana Raju	Telugu Desam Party
1985	Vangapandu Narayanappala Naidu	Indian National Congress
1989	Aruna Padala	Telugu Desam Party
1994	Aruna Padala	Telugu Desam Party
1999	Taddi Sanyasi Appala Naidu	Indian National Congress
2004	Aruna Padala	Telugu Desam Party
2009	Botcha Appalanarasayya	Indian National Congress
2014	Kondapalli Appala Naidu	Telugu Desam Party
2019	Botcha Appalanarasayya	YSR Congress Party
2024	Kondapalli Srinivas	Telugu Desam Party

== Election results ==
=== 1994 ===
1994 Andhra Pradesh Legislative Assembly election: Gajapathinagaram
Party	Candidate	Votes	%	±%
TDP	Aruna Padala	46,455	51.1	▲10.5
INC	Taddi Sanyasinayudu	39,636	43.6	▲18.1
BJP	Pydisetty Kolla	3,433	3.8	
BSP	Adinarayana Naru	1,018	1.1	
Independent	Lenka Madhavarao	240	0.3	
Independent	Rajeti Ramarao	167	0.2	
Majority		6,819	7.3	▼1.2
Turnout		93,305	78.5	▲1.2
TDP hold		Swing		

=== 1999 ===
1999 Andhra Pradesh Legislative Assembly election: Gajapathinagaram
Party	Candidate	Votes	%	±%
INC	Taddi Naidu	36,180	39.9	▼3.7
TDP	Gedda Rao	31,233	34.4	▼16.7
Independent	Narayanappala Naidu	22,945	25.3	
Independent	Vakkalagadda Rao	366	0.4	
Majority		4,947	5.2	▼2.1
Turnout		94,736	79.7	▲1.2
INC gain from TDP		Swing		

=== 2004 ===
2004 Andhra Pradesh Legislative Assembly election: Gajapathinagaram
Party	Candidate	Votes	%	±%
TDP	Aruna Padala	45,530	47.80	+13.37
INC	Narayana Appala Naidu Vangapandu	35,168	36.92	−2.96
Majority		10,362	10.88	
Turnout		95,251	78.73	+2.38
TDP gain from INC		Swing		

=== 2009 ===
2009 Andhra Pradesh Legislative Assembly election: Gajapathinagaram
Party	Candidate	Votes	%	±%
INC	Botcha Appalanarasayya	66,670	44.31	−3.49
TDP	Aruna Padala	38,996	25.92	−11.00
PRP	Kadubandi Srinivasarao	35,537	23.62	
Majority		27,674	18.39	
Turnout		150,465	83.71	+4.98
INC gain from TDP		Swing		

=== 2014 ===
2014 Andhra Pradesh Legislative Assembly election: Gajapathinagaram
Party	Candidate	Votes	%	±%
TDP	Kondapalli Appala Naidu	65,118	40.97	
YSRCP	Kadubandi Srinivasa Rao	45,694	28.75	
INC	Appalanarasayya Botcha	44,325	27.89	
Majority		19,423	12.22	
Turnout		159,713	85.46	+1.75
TDP gain from INC		Swing		

=== 2019 ===
2019 Andhra Pradesh Legislative Assembly election: Gajapathinagaram
Party	Candidate	Votes	%	±%
YSRCP	Botcha Appalanarasayya	93,270	54.12	
TDP	Appalanaidu Kondapalli	66,259	38.45	
Majority		27,011	12.22	
Turnout		159,713	85.46	+1.75
YSRCP gain from TDP		Swing		

=== 2024 ===
2024 Andhra Pradesh Legislative Assembly election: Gajapathinagaram
Party	Candidate	Votes	%	±%
TDP	Kondapalli Srinivas	98,051	54.99	
YSRCP	Botcha Appalanarasayya	72,750	40.8	
INC	Dola Srinivas	1,315	0.74	
NOTA	None Of The Above	3,729	2.09	
Majority		25,301	14.18	
Turnout		1,78,313		
TDP gain from YSRCP		Swing		

== See also ==
- List of constituencies of the Andhra Pradesh Legislative Assembly
