= Botsa Jhansi Lakshmi =

Indian politician

Jhansi Laxmi Botcha

Member of Parliament, Lok Sabha
- In office 2009–2014
- Preceded by: Constituency Established
- Succeeded by: Ashok Gajapathi Raju
- Constituency: Vizianagaram
- In office 2006–2008
- Preceded by: Kondapalli Pydithalli Naidu
- Succeeded by: Constituency Abolished
- Constituency: Bobbili

Personal details
- Party: YSR Congress Party
- Spouse: Botsa Satyanarayana
- Children: 1 son and 1 daughter
- As of 20 November, 2010

Botsa Jhansi Lakshmi (born 11 April 1964), also spelled as Botcha Jhansi Lakshmi, is an Indian politician and past member of the Lok Sabha from Vizianagaram, Andhra Pradesh.

== Personal life and education ==
Botcha Jhansi Lakshmi born to Majji Rama Rao and Kalavathi. Her father was a police officer (Retd. Spl SP). Though her family hails from Visakhapatnam, due to her father's transfers, she was raised in many place including Visakhapatnam, Vijayawada, Rampachodavaram and Rajahmundry. She completed her PHD in Philosophy from Andhra University, Visakhapatnam. She married her brother in law (bava) Botsa Satyanarayana, Minister and former PCC of Andhra Pradesh. She has a son and a daughter.

== Career ==
Jhansi represented Vizianagaram Zilla Parishad Chairperson from 2001 to 2006. During 2007–09, she represented the Bobbili constituency in the Lok Sabha. She is the second time member of Lok Sabha from Vizianagaram Constituency in 2009. She belongs to the YSR Congress party.

== Positions held ==
- 2005 Member (Nominated), All India Congress Committee
- 2010 Executive Member, Indian Parliamentary Group
- 2010 Chairman, MGNREGA Sub-Committee, Working Group on Specific Needs of Specific Category
- 2010 Chairman, India-Azerbaijan Parliamentary Friendship Group
- 2010 Executive Committee Member, Congress Parliamentary Party

== Awards ==
She received Uttam Mahila Award 2002–2003 from Visakha Samacharam, a Journal.
