= Srikanth Kondapalli =

Indian Sinologist

- Education: BA, MA, Osmania University; M.Phil, PhD, Jawaharlal Nehru University
- Occupations: Sinologist, political scientist, author, professor
- Writing career
- Subjects: International relations, Military Science, Chinese studies
- Notable awards: K. Subrahmanyam Award (Year 2010)

Srikanth Kondapalli is a Professor of China studies at Jawaharlal Nehru University, New Delhi, India.

Kondapalli is a frequent writer and commentator in the national and international media. He has been quoted regularly in BBC News, China Daily, Der Spiegel, The Atlantic, The New York Times, The Indian Express, The Guardian, The Times of India, The Wall Street Journal, The Washington Post, and Xinhua.

== Education ==
Kondapalli completed his degrees in Bachelor of Arts and Master of Arts in History from Osmania University, Hyderabad. Later he completed his degrees in Master of Philosophy (in 1989) and Doctor of Philosophy (in 1995) in Chinese studies from the School of International Studies, Jawaharlal Nehru University, New Delhi. He studied Chinese language at Beijing Language & Culture University and was a postdoctoral researcher cum visiting fellow at People's University, Beijing from period 1996–1998.

== Bibliography ==
=== Books ===
- China's Military, the PLA in Transition (1st edition). New Delhi: South Asia Books. ISBN 9788186019184.
- China's Naval Power. New Delhi: Institute for Defence Studies and Analyses. ISBN 9788186019375.
- China and its Neighbours. New Delhi: Pentagon Press. ISBN 9788182744493.
- China's Military and India. New Delhi: Pentagon Press. ISBN 9788182746893.
- China and the BRICS Setting Up a Different Kitchen (2017 edition). New Delhi: Pentagon Press. ISBN 9788182749276.
- One Belt, One Road: China's Global Outreach. New Delhi: Pentagon Press. ISBN 9789386618030.

== Awards ==
- K. Subrahmanyam Award (2010)
