= Bellana Chandra Sekhar =

Politician from Andhra Pradesh, India

Member of Parliament, Lok Sabha
- In office 23 May 2019 – 04 June 2024
- Preceded by: Ashok Gajapathi Raju Pusapati
- Succeeded by: Appalanaidu Kalisetti
- Constituency: Vizianagaram, Andhra Pradesh

Personal details
- Born: 11 August 1961 (age 64)
- Party: YSR Congress Party
- Spouse: Sridevi

Bellana Chandra Sekhar is an Indian politician. He was elected to the Lok Sabha, lower house of the Parliament of India from Vizianagaram, Andhra Pradesh in the 2019 Indian general election as a member of the YSR Congress Party.
