= Pusapati Vijayarama Gajapati Raju =

Indian parliamentarian and philanthropist (1924–1995)

Pusapati Vijayrama Gajapati Raju

Member of Parliament, Lok Sabha
- In office 1977–1984
- Preceded by: Karri Narayana Rao
- Succeeded by: Pusapati Ananda Gajapati Raju
- Constituency: Bobbili
- In office 1971–1977
- Preceded by: Tenneti Viswanadham
- Succeeded by: Dronamraju Satyanarayana
- Constituency: Visakhapatnam
- In office 1957–1962
- Preceded by: Gam Malludora; Lanka Sundaram
- Succeeded by: Pusapati Vijaya Ananda Gajapathi Raju
- Constituency: Visakhapatnam

Personal details
- Born: 2 May 1924 Vizianagaram, Vizianagaram estate (now in Andhra Pradesh, India)
- Died: 14 November 1995 (aged 71)
- Party: Socialist Party; Indian National Congress
- Children: 6, including Pusapati Ananda Gajapati Raju and Ashok Gajapathi Raju

Maharaja Pusapati Vijayrama Gajapati Raju D.Litt. was an Indian parliamentarian and philanthropist. He was the eldest son of Maharaja Alak Narayanadev Gajapathi Raju and Vidyavathi Devi of Vizianagaram estate in Andhra Pradesh. He was born at Phool Bagh Palace in Vizianagaram.

He purchased the Korukonda Palace and the 1,000 acres (4.0 km^{2}) of land surrounding it and donated it to the Government of India for the establishment of the Sainik School in 1961–1962. It is one of the 20 Sainik Schools established in India and the only one in Andhra Pradesh.

He was elected as a member of the Madras and Andhra Pradesh Legislative Assemblies during 1952–1956 and 1956–1957 respectively. He again became a member of Andhra Pradesh Legislative Assembly between 1960 and 1971 and served as a Minister in the State Council of Ministers and held various important portfolios. He was elected to the second and fifth Lok Sabha from Visakhapatnam parliamentary constituency in 1957–1960 and 1971–1977 respectively. He was also elected to the sixth and seventh Lok Sabha from Bobbili parliamentary constituency in 1977–1980 and 1980–1984 respectively.

Raju served as the president of the Andhra Cricket Association.

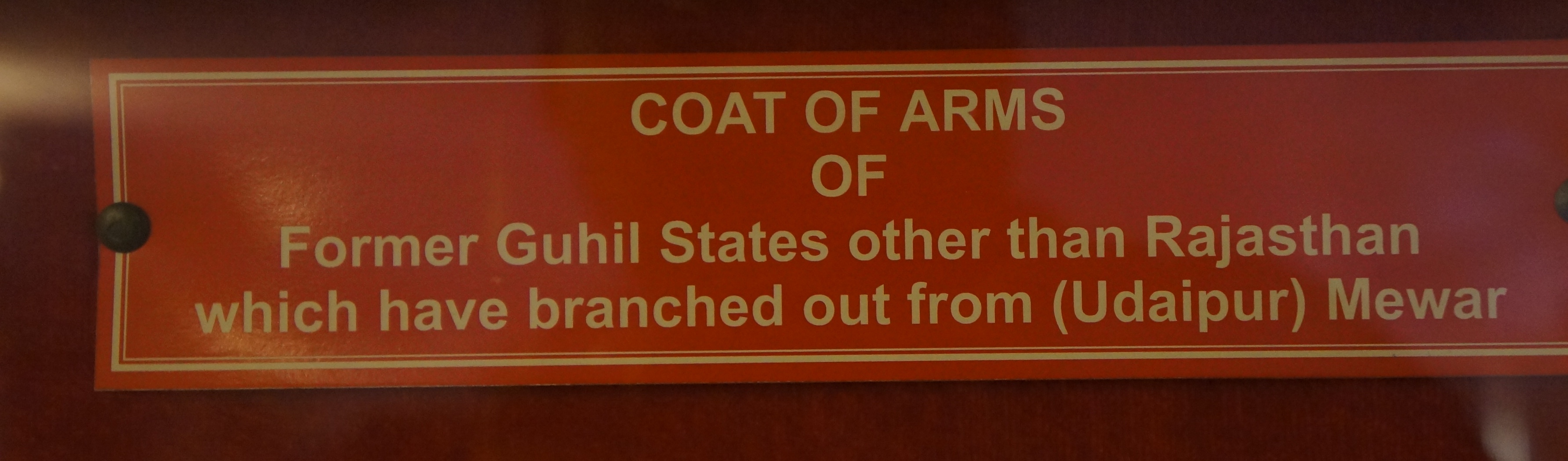
Mewar coat of arms

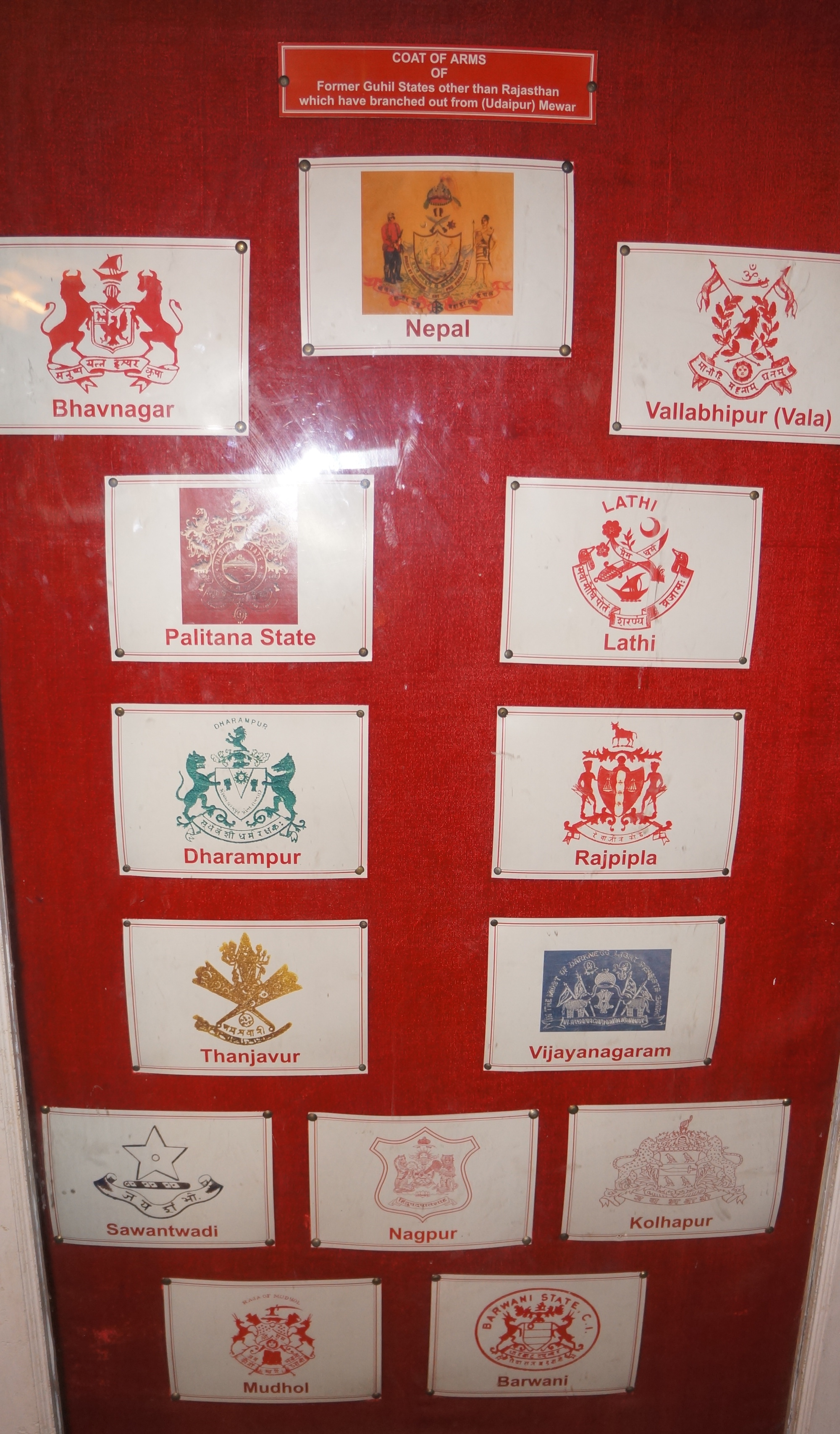
Branches of the Sisodia Clan

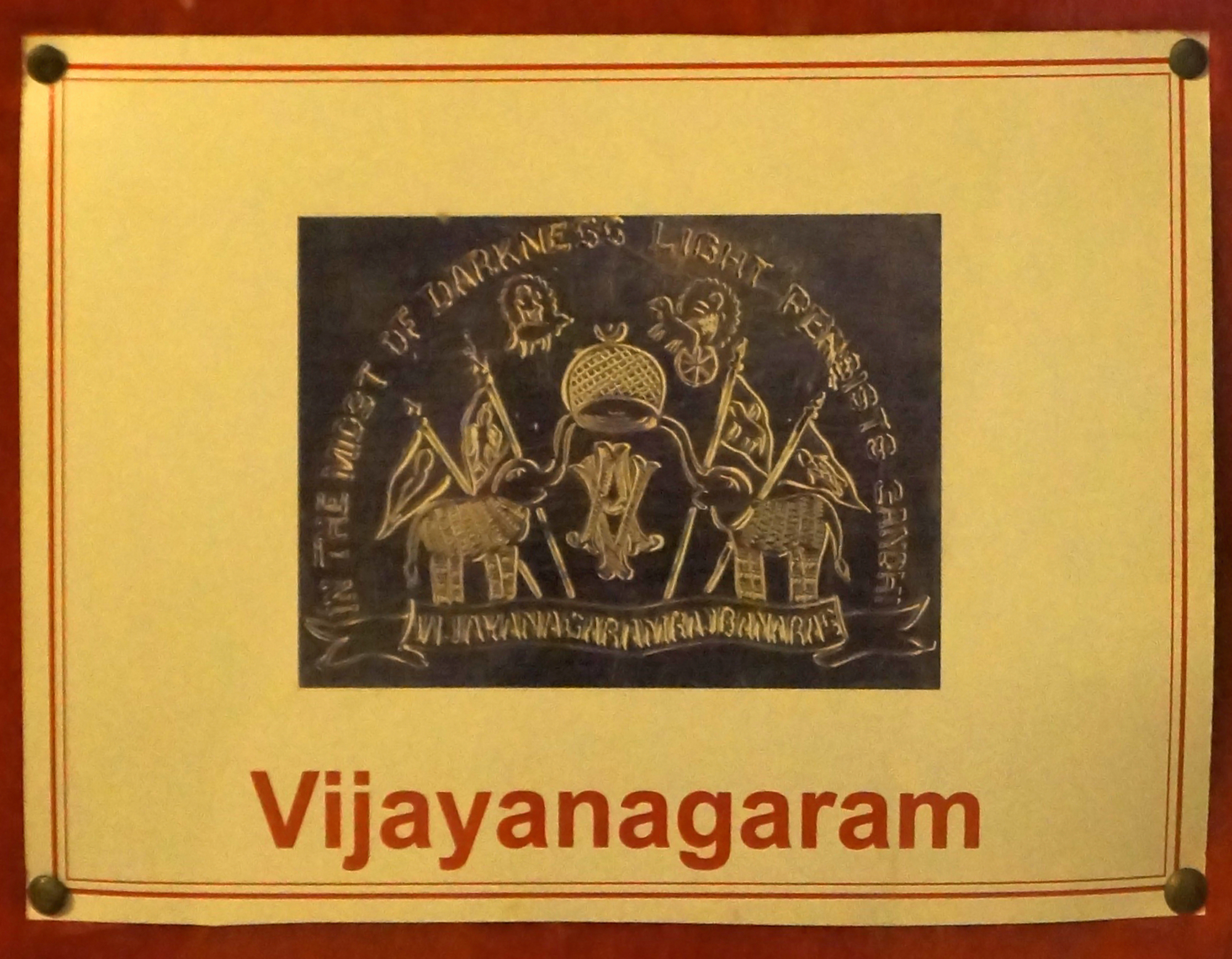
Coat of Arms of Vijayanagaram

== See also ==
- Bobbili Lok Sabha Constituency
- Visakhapatnam Lok Sabha Constituency
