= Kondapalli Srinivas =

Indian politician

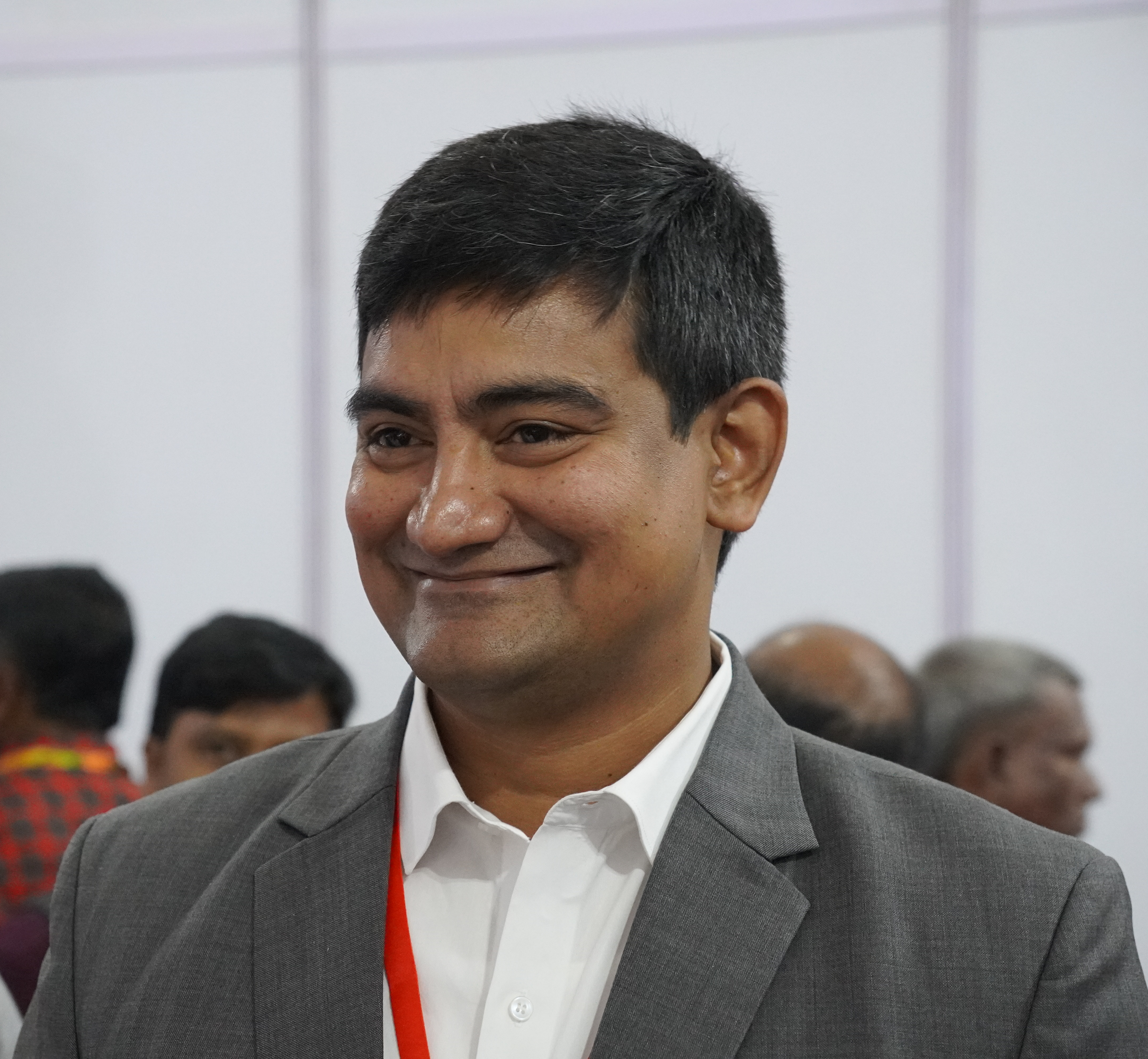

Minister of Micro, Small and Medium Enterprises & Society for Elimination of Rural Poverty Government of Andhra Pradesh
- Incumbent
- Assumed office 12 June 2024
- Governor: S. Abdul Nazeer
- Chief Minister: N. Chandrababu Naidu
- Preceded by: Gudivada Amarnath (Industries & Commerce;MSME); Budi Mutyala Naidu (Panchayat Raj & Rural Development;SERP)

Minister of NRI Empowerment & Relations Government of Andhra Pradesh
- Incumbent
- Assumed office 12 June 2024
- Governor: S. Abdul Nazeer
- Chief Minister: N. Chandrababu Naidu
- Preceded by: Y. S. Jagan Mohan Reddy (Chief Minister;GAD)

Member of the Andhra Pradesh Legislative Assembly
- Incumbent
- Assumed office 4 June 2024
- Preceded by: Botcha Appalanarasayya
- Constituency: Gajapathinagaram

Kondapalli Srinivas is an Indian politician from Andhra Pradesh. He is a member of Telugu Desam Party. He has been elected as the Member of the Legislative Assembly representing the Gajapathinagaram Assembly constituency in 2024 Andhra Pradesh Legislative Assembly elections.
