= Cheepurupalli Assembly constituency =

Constituency of the Andhra Pradesh Legislative Assembly, India

Coordinates: 18.31°N 83.57°E

Cheepurupalli
- Constituency No. 15 for the Andhra Pradesh Legislative Assembly
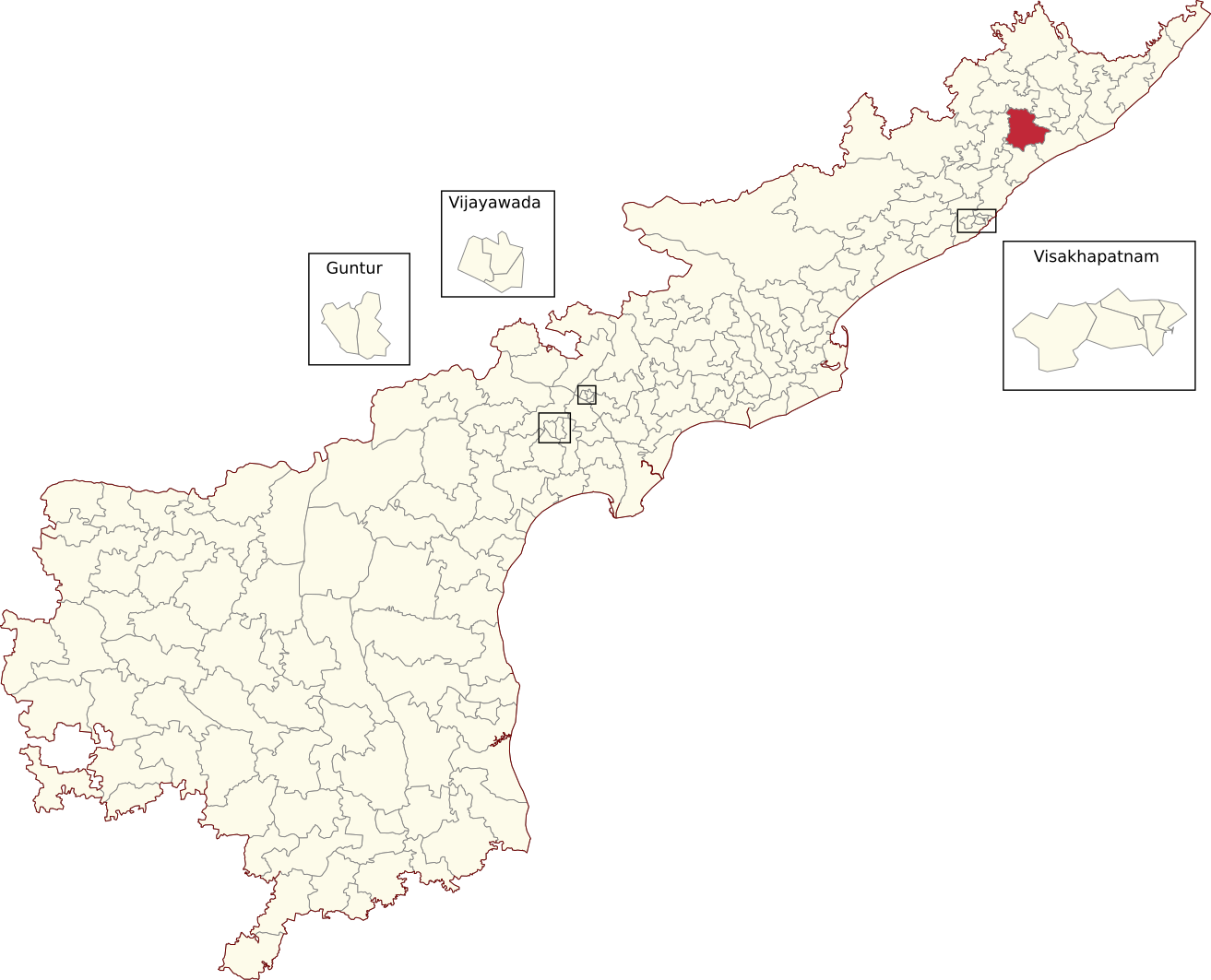
- Location of Cheepurupalli Assembly constituency within Andhra Pradesh

Constituency details
- Country: India
- Region: South India
- State: Andhra Pradesh
- District: Vizianagaram
- Lok Sabha constituency: Vizianagaram
- Established: 1951
- Total electors: 198,832
- Reservation: None

Member of Legislative Assembly
- 16th Andhra Pradesh Legislative Assembly
- Incumbent Kimidi Kalavenkata Rao
- Party: TDP
- Alliance: NDA
- Elected year: 2024

Cheepurupalli Assembly constituency is a constituency in Vizianagaram district of Andhra Pradesh that elects representatives to the Andhra Pradesh Legislative Assembly in India. It is one of the seven assembly segments of Vizianagaram Lok Sabha constituency.

Kimidi Kalavenkata Rao is the current MLA of the constituency, having won the 2024 Andhra Pradesh Legislative Assembly election from Telugu Desam Party. As of 2019, there are a total of 198,832 electors in the constituency. The constituency was established in 1951, as per the Delimitation Orders (1951).

== Mandals ==
The four mandals that form the assembly constituency are:

Mandal
Cheepurupalli
Garividi
Gurla
Merakamudidam

Mandals in Cheepurupalli Assembly Constituency

== Members of the Legislative Assembly ==
Year	Member	Political party
1952	Thaddi Chinna Atchanaidu	Independent
1955	Modandi Satyanarayana Raju	Praja Socialist Party
1962	Kotla Sanyasi Appala Naidu	Swatantra Party
1967	T. R. Rao	Independent
1972	Pydapu Naidu routhu	Indian National Congress
1978	Chigilipalli Syamalarao	Indian National Congress (I)
1983	Tripurana Venkata Ratnam	Telugu Desam Party
1985	Kemburi Rama Mohan Rao	Telugu Desam Party
1989	Tankala Saraswatamma	Telugu Desam Party
1994	Gadde Babu Rao	Telugu Desam Party
1999	Gadde Babu Rao	Telugu Desam Party
2004	Botsa Satyanarayana	Indian National Congress
2009	Botsa Satyanarayana	Indian National Congress
2014	Kimidi Mrunalini	Telugu Desam Party
2019	Botsa Satyanarayana	YSR Congress Party
2024	Kimidi Kalavenkata Rao	Telugu Desam Party

== Election results ==
=== 2024 ===
2024 Andhra Pradesh Legislative Assembly election: Cheepurupalle
Party	Candidate	Votes	%	±%
TDP	Kalavenkatarao Kimidi	88,225	50.98	
YSRCP	Botcha Satyanarayana	76,254	44.06	
INC	Aadinarayana Jammu	4,087	2.36	
NOTA	None of the Above	2,855	1.65	
Majority		11,971	6.92	
Turnout		173,055	84.04	
TDP gain from YSRCP		Swing		

=== 2019 ===
2019 Andhra Pradesh Legislative Assembly election: Cheepurupalli
Party	Candidate	Votes	%	±%
YSRCP	Botcha Satyanarayana	89,262	53.81	
TDP	Nagarjuna Kimidi	62,764	37.84	
INC	Adinarayana Jammu	4,562	2.75	
JSP	Mylipilli Srinivasa Rao	3,659	2.21	
NOTA	None of the Above	3,353	2.02	
BJP	Shankar Lal Sharma Dhandu	1,055	0.64	
Majority		26,498	15.97	
Turnout		165,883	83.36	
YSRCP gain from TDP		Swing		

=== 2014 ===
2014 Andhra Pradesh Legislative Assembly election: Cheepurupalle
Party	Candidate	Votes	%	±%
TDP	Kimidi Mrunalini	63,787	41.41	
INC	Botcha Satyanarayana	42,945	27.88	
YSRCP	Bellana Chandra Sekhar	42,179	27.38	
LSP	Reddi Lakhnu Naidu	1,048	0.68	
NOTA	None of the Above	765	0.50	
Majority		20,842	13.53	
Turnout		154,055	81.34	
TDP gain from INC		Swing		

=== 2009 ===
2009 Andhra Pradesh Legislative Assembly election: Cheepurupalli
Party	Candidate	Votes	%	±%
INC	Botcha Satyanarayana	60,677	42.65	−9.97
TDP	Gadde Babu Rao	54,735	38.47	−4.14
PRP	Sunitha Routhu	16,418	11.54	
Majority		5,942	4.18	
Turnout		142,281	79.87	+6.24
INC hold		Swing		

=== 2004 ===
2004 Andhra Pradesh Legislative Assembly election: Cheepurupalli
Party	Candidate	Votes	%	±%
INC	Botcha Satyanarayana	58,008	52.62	+18.98
TDP	Gadde Babu Rao	46,974	42.61	+4.29
Majority		11,034	10.01	
Turnout		110,229	73.63	+4.32
INC gain from TDP		Swing		

=== 1999 ===
1999 Andhra Pradesh Legislative Assembly election: Cheepurupalli
Party	Candidate	Votes	%	±%
TDP	Gadde Rao	38,089	38.3	▼17.9
INC	Meesala Neelakantam	33,438	33.6	▼5.8
Independent	Kemburu Rao	21,503	21.6	▼17.8
Anna Telugu Desam Party	Kutikuppala Rao	3,111	3.1	
Independent	Saketi Rao	1,114	1.1	
Ajeya Bharat Party	Avala Padmanabham	614	0.6	
RPI	Appa Rao Dandi	571	0.6	
Independent	Badana Naidu	499	0.5	
Independent	Appa Basina	459	0.5	
Margin of victory		4,651	4.5	▼11.9
Turnout		104,496	72.9	▲0.5
Registered electors		143,406		−368
TDP hold		Swing		

=== 1994 ===
1994 Andhra Pradesh Legislative Assembly election: Cheepurupalli
Party	Candidate	Votes	%	±%
TDP	Gadde Rao	56,988	56.2	▲0.8
INC	Meesala Neeelakantam	39,923	39.4	▼3.6
BJP	Koka Devi	2,881	2.8	
BSP	Gunupuru Rao	960	1.0	
Independent	Madugula Babu	250	0.3	
Independent	Pasumarthi Rao	346	0.2	
Independent	Seepana Sriramulu	93	0.1	
Majority		17,065	16.4	▲4.5
Turnout		104,042	72.4	▲1.9
TDP hold		Swing		

=== 1989 ===
1989 Andhra Pradesh Legislative Assembly election: Cheepurupalli
Party	Candidate	Votes	%	±%
TDP	Tankala Saraswatamma	49,121	55.4	▼16.3
INC	Meesala Neeelakantam	38,089	43.0	▲22.4
LKD	Duggirala Babu	845	1.0	
Independent	Velicheti Rao	331	0.4	
Independent	Velivela Raghunadh	270	0.3	
Majority		11,032	11.9	▼38.1
Turnout		92,975	70.5	▲9.4
TDP hold		Swing		

=== 1985 ===
1985 Andhra Pradesh Legislative Assembly election: Cheepurupalli
Party	Candidate	Votes	%	±%
TDP	Kemburi Rao	45,349	71.7	▲10
Independent	Meesala Neeelakantam	13,052	20.6	
Independent	Ponnada Naidu	1,966	3.1	
Independent	Hamasa Suryanarayana	1,240	2.0	
Independent	Boddepalli Rao	903	1.4	
Independent	Varaha Raju	723	1.1	
Majority		32,297	50.0	▲17.6
Turnout		64,616	61.1	▼9.2
TDP hold		Swing		

=== 1983 ===
1983 Andhra Pradesh Legislative Assembly election: Cheepurupalli
Party	Candidate	Votes	%	±%
TDP	Tripurana Ratnam	41,887	61.7	
INC	Gorle Naidu	19,318	28.5	▲3.2
CPI(M)	Chowdari Tejeswararao	3,533	5.2	
BJP	Kotla Naidu	2,760	4.1	
Independent	Killi Nageswararao	408	0.6	
Majority		22,569	32.4	▲16.8
Turnout		69,650	70.3	▼3.4
TDP gain from INC(I)		Swing		

=== 1978 ===
1978 Andhra Pradesh Legislative Assembly election: Cheepurupalli
Party	Candidate	Votes	%	±%
INC(I)	Chigilipalli Syamalarao	27,943	41.5	▼11.87
Independent	Akkalanaidu Tankala	17,034	25.3	
JP	Ravuthu Paidapunaidu	13,083	19.4	
INC	Kutcherlapati Raju	7,465	11.1	
Independent	Bevara Venugopalanaidu	1,867	2.8	
Majority		10,909	15.6	▲8.86
Turnout		70,073	73.7	▲11.83
INC(I) gain from INC		Swing		

=== 1972 ===
1972 Andhra Pradesh Legislative Assembly election: Cheepurupalli
Party	Candidate	Votes	%	±%
INC	Pydapu Routhu	23,485	53.37	▲33.76
Independent	Mudundi Satyanarayanaraju	20,520	46.63	
Majority		2,965	6.74	▼33.95
Turnout		44,005	61.87	▼6.90
INC gain from Independent		Swing		

=== 1967 ===
1967 Andhra Pradesh Legislative Assembly election: Cheepurupalli
Party	Candidate	Votes	%	±%
Independent	T.R. Rao	24,532	60.30	
INC	K.S. Appalanaidu	7,976	19.61	▼23.62
CPI	M.A. Naidu	5,191	12.76	
SWA	B.S. Naidu	2,984	7.33	▼49.43
Majority		16,556	40.69	▲27.16
Turnout		40,683	68.77	
Independent gain from SWA		Swing		

=== 1962 ===
1962 Andhra Pradesh Legislative Assembly election: Cheepurupalli
Party	Candidate	Votes	%	±%
SWA	Kotla Naidu	18,021	56.76	New
INC	Mudundi Satyanarayanaraju	13,724	43.23	
Majority		4,297	13.53	▼38.22
Turnout		31,745		
SWA gain from Praja Socialist Party + Krishikar Lok Party		Swing		

=== 1955 ===
1955 Andhra State Legislative Assembly election: Cheepurupalli
Party	Candidate	Votes	%	±%
PSP	Modandi Raju	30,183	38.62	
KLP	Tadde Naidu	17,466	22.35	▲13.5
KLP	Kottapalli Punnayya	10,260	13.13	▲5.84
CPI	Modallavalssa Naidu	7,988	10.22	
Independent	Ayyagari Rao	6,860	8.78	
CPI	Mamidi Kuramayya	5,401	6.91	
Majority		22,977	51.75	▲51.62
Turnout		78,158	78.36	▼1.80
Praja Socialist Party + Krishikar Lok Party gain from Independent		Swing		

=== 1952 ===
1952 Madras Legislative Assembly election: Cheepurupalli
Party	Candidate	Votes	%	±%
Independent	Thaddi Chinna Atchanaidu	23,446	19.32	
Independent	Mudundi Satyanarayanaraju	23,289	19.19	
INC	Peddinti Ramaswamy Naidu	15,888	13.09	13.09
INC	Pothula Gunnayya	14,953	12.32	12.32
Socialist Party (India)	Tentu Lakshmanajudu	14,790	12.19	
KLP	Mondata Parannaidu	10,746	8.85	
KLP	Kothapalle Pannayya	8,853	7.29	
Independent	Gollapalli Sambayya	5,716	4.71	
Independent	Beri Geddayya	3,693	3.04	
Margin of victory		157	0.13	
Turnout		1,21,374	80.16	
Registered electors		1,51,407		
Independent win (new seat)				

== See also ==
- List of constituencies of the Andhra Pradesh Legislative Assembly
