= Cheepurupalli =

Chipurupalli
- Census Town
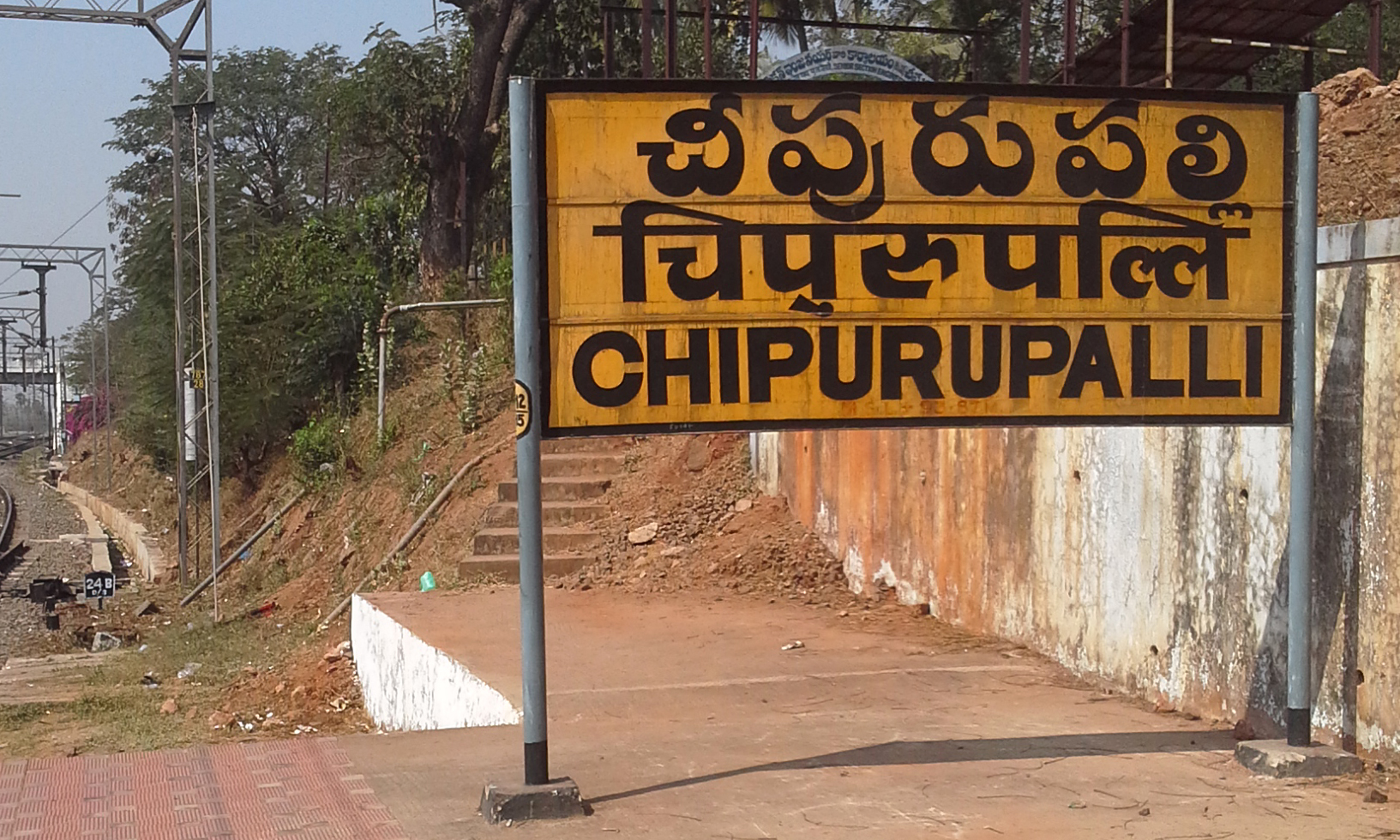
- Cheepurupalli railway signboard

- Location in Andhra Pradesh, India
- Coordinates: 18.3000°N 83.5667°E
- Country: India
- State: Andhra Pradesh
- District: Vizianagaram

Government
  - Body: Panchayati Raj
  - MLA: Kimidi Kalavenkata Rao

Area
  - Total: 3.48 km^{2} (1.34 sq mi)
- Elevation: 83 m (272 ft)

Population (2011)
  - Total: 78,000
  - Density: 22,000/km^{2} (58,000/sq mi)

Languages
  - Official: Telugu
- Time zone: UTC+5:30 (IST)
- PIN: 535 128
- Telephone code: 91–8952
- Vehicle Registration: AP35 (Former); AP39 (from 30 January 2019)
- Sex ratio: 1020 ♂/♀

Cheepurupalli is a census town in Vizianagaram district of the Indian state of Andhra Pradesh. The town is located 30 km to the north of Vizianagaram. The town covers an area of 348 hectares with a population of 78,000 according to the 2011 census.

The town's location on the Howrah-Chennai railway line has aided the town in becoming a center of administration, education and entertainment for the surrounding villages.

== Demographics ==
The town has a population of 78.000 according to the 2011 census, with 38,500 males and 39,500 females. The sex ratio at 1158.6, is higher than the national average of 940 and the state average of 993. However, child sex ratio stands at 916 compared to the state average of 939.

Literacy rate stands at 74.41%, higher than the state average of 67.4%. The population is primarily Hindu, with a significant Muslim and Christian population in the town. The primary language spoken is Telugu.

== Government and politics ==
The village is a part of Cheepurupalli (Assembly constituency), an assembly segment of Vizianagaram (Lok Sabha constituency). Kimidi Kalavenkata Rao is the present MLA of the constituency, who won the 2024 Andhra Pradesh Legislative Assembly election from TDP.
