= Kondapalli Pydithalli Naidu =

Indian politician

K. P. Naidu

Member of parliament of Lok Sabha
- In office 2004–2009
- In office 1996–1999
- Succeeded by: Botsa Jhansi
- Constituency: Bobbili

Personal details
- Born: 20 November 1930 Vijayanagaram, Andhra Pradesh
- Died: 18 August 2006 (aged 75) Vijayanagaram
- Party: Telugu Desam Party
- Spouse: Kondapally Appayamma
- Children: 3 sons (K. Venkataramana, K. Kondala Rao, Kondapalli Appala Naidu) and 2 daughters (R. Lakshmi and P. Vara Lakshmi)
- As of 26 September, 2006

Kondapalli Pydithalli Naidu also spelled Kondapalli Paidithalli Naidu (20 November 1930 – 18 August 2006) was a member of the 11th, 12th and 14th Lok Sabha of India. He represented the Bobbili constituency of Andhra Pradesh and was a member of the Telugu Desam Party.
