= Regadi =

Regidi Amadalavalasa
- Village
- Interactive map of Regidi Amadalavalasa
- Location in Andhra Pradesh, India
- Country: India
- State: Andhra Pradesh
- District: Vizianagaram

Languages
  - Official: Telugu
- Time zone: UTC+5:30 (IST)
- Vehicle Registration: AP30 (Former); AP39 (from 30 January 2019)

Regidi Amadalavalasa is a village in Vizianagaram district of the Indian state of Andhra Pradesh. It is located in Regidi Amadalavalasa mandal.
