= Ranastalam =

- Village
- Interactive map of Ranastalam
- Location in Andhra Pradesh, India Ranastalam (India)
- Coordinates: 18°12′10″N 83°41′20″E
- Country: India
- State: Andhra Pradesh
- District: Srikakulam
- Talukas: Ranastalam

Government
  - Body: Panchayat

Population (2011)
  - Total: 5,697

Languages
  - Official: Telugu
- Time zone: UTC+5:30 (IST)
- Vehicle Registration: AP30 (former); AP39 (from 30 January 2019)

Ranastalam is a village adjoining National Highway 16 in Srikakulam district of the Indian state of Andhra Pradesh. There are nearly 55 villages in Ranastalam mandal. J.R.Puram, Kondamulagam, Kosta pydibheemavaram kammasigadam etc.
