= Manapuram =

Manapuram may refer to:

- China Manapuram a village panchayat in Gantyada mandal in Vizianagaram district in Andhra Pradesh
- Peda Manapuram, is a village panchayat in Dattirajeru mandal of Vizianagaram district in Andhra Pradesh
