= Bobbili revenue division =

Revenue division in Vizianagaram district, Andhra Pradesh, India

- revenue division in Vizianagaram district
- Country: India
- State: Andhra Pradesh
- District: Vizianagaram
- Formed: 4 April 2022
- Founder: Government of Andhra Pradesh
- Time zone: UTC+05:30 (IST)

Bobbili revenue division is an administrative division in the Vizianagaram district of the Indian state of Andhra Pradesh. It is one of the three revenue divisions in the district and comprises nine mandals. It was formed on 4 April 2022 by the Y. S. Jagan Mohan Reddy-led Government of Andhra Pradesh.

== Mandalas ==
There are a total of 7 Mandals in Bobbili revenue division:

1. Bobbili mandal
2. Ramabhadrapuram mandal
3. Badangi mandal
4. Therlam mandal
5. Gajapathinagaram mandal
6. Dattirajeru mandal
7. Mentada mandal
