= Vannali =

- Village
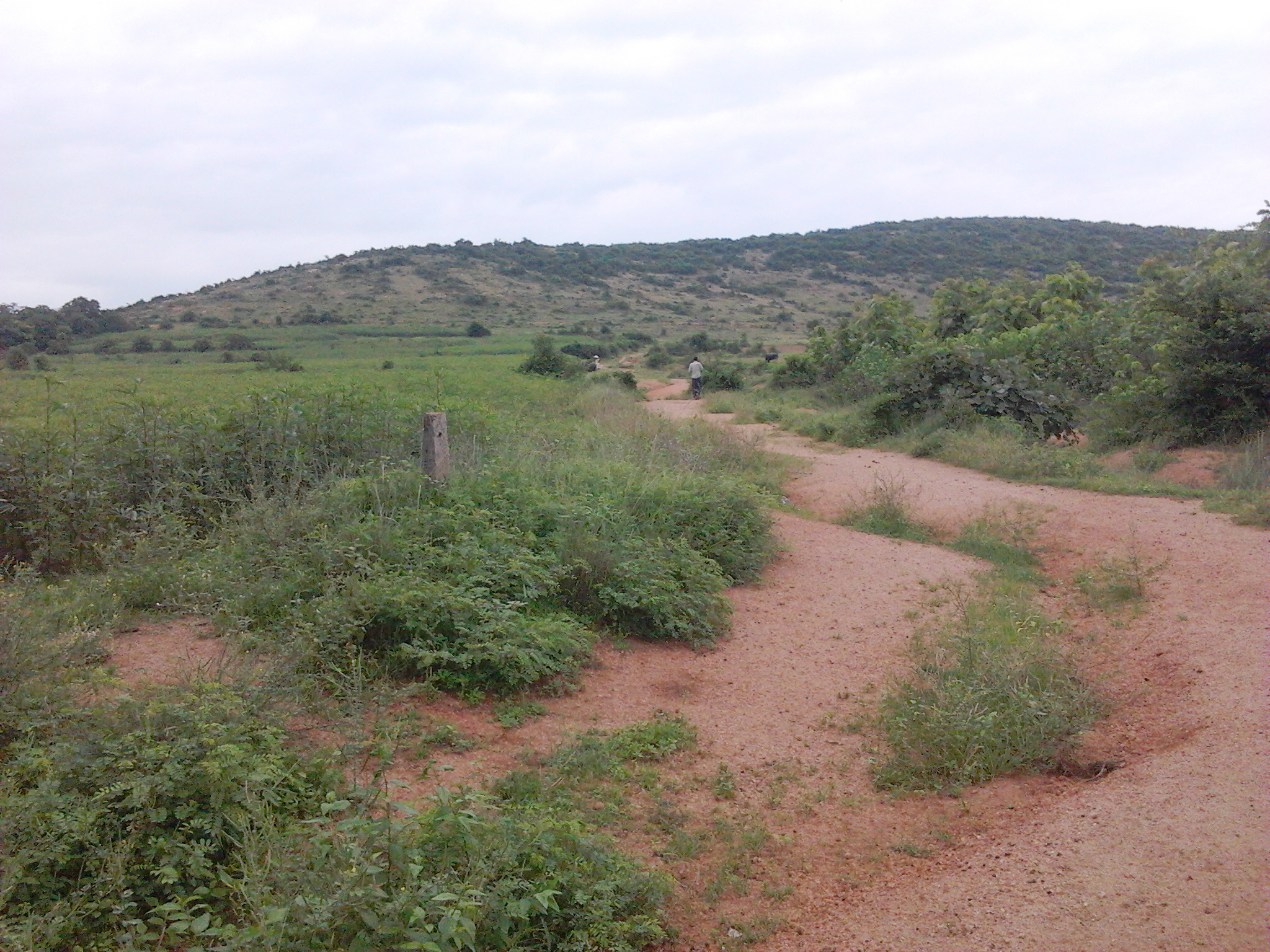
- Vannali village
- Interactive map of Vannali
- Location in Andhra Pradesh, India
- Coordinates: 18°30′N 83°46′E
- Country: India
- State: Andhra Pradesh
- District: Vizianagaram

Population (2016)
  - Total: 1,042

Languages
  - Official: Telugu
- Time zone: UTC+5:30 (IST)

Vannali village is located in Regidi Amadalavalasa mandal of Vizianagaram district in Andhra Pradesh, India. It is situated 7km away from sub-district headquarter Regidi Amadalavalasa and 60km away from district headquarter Vizianagaram. As per 2009 stats, Vannali village is also a gram panchayat.
