= Suravaram =

Suravaram may refer to:

- Suravaram (name), Indian surname includes list of people with this name

== Places ==
- Suravaram, village in Jalumuru mandal, Srikakulam district, Andhra Pradesh, India
- Suravaram, village in Santhakavati mandal, Srikakulam district, Andhra Pradesh, India
- Suravaram, former mandal containing Kommuru, Krishna district, Andhra Pradesh
- Suravaram, village in Dummugudem division, Khammam district, Telangana, India
- Suravaram, village in Agiripalle mandal, Krishna district, Andhra Pradesh, India
