= Mentada mandal =

- Mandal
- Interactive map of Mentada mandal
- Location in Andhra Pradesh, India
- Coordinates: 18.3167°N 83.2333°E
- Country: India
- State: Andhra Pradesh
- District: Vizianagaram
- Headquarters: Mentada

Government
  - Body: Mandal Parishad

Population (2011)
  - Total: 49,153

Languages
  - Official: Telugu
- Time zone: UTC+5:30 (IST)

Mentada mandal is one of the 34 mandals in Vizianagaram district of the Indian state of Andhra Pradesh. It is administration under Parvathipuram revenue division and headquartered at Mentada. The mandal is bounded by Pachipenta, Ramabhadrapuram, Dattirajeru and Gajapathinagaram mandals. A portion of it also borders the state of Odisha.

== Demographics ==
As of 2011 census, the mandal had a population of 49,153. The total population constitute, 24,378 males and 24,775 females. The entire population is rural in nature.

== Government and politics ==
Mentada mandal is one of the four mandals in Salur (Assembly constituency), which in turn is a part of Araku (Lok Sabha constituency), one of the 25 Lok Sabha constituencies representing Andhra Pradesh. The present MLA is Rajanna Dora Peedika, who won the Andhra Pradesh Legislative Assembly election, 2014 representing YSR Congress Party.

== Rural villages ==
As of 2011 2011 census of India, the mandal has 37 settlements, consisting of 37 villages.

The settlements in the mandal are listed below:

1. Aguru
2. Amarayavalasa
3. Andra
4. Badevalasa
5. Butchirajupeta
6. Challapeta
7. Chinamedapalle
8. Chintalavalasa
9. Gajamguddivalasa
10. Gurlatammaraju Peta
11. Gurramma Valasa
12. Iddanavalasa
13. Ippalavalasa
14. Jakkuva
15. Jayathi
16. Khailam
17. Kompangi
18. Kondalingalavalasa
19. Kuneru
20. Kuntinavalasa
21. Lothugedda
22. Meesalapeta
23. Mentada
24. Mirthivalasa
25. Nikkalavalasa
26. Pedachamalapalle
27. Pedamedapalle
28. Pittada
29. Poram
30. Poramlova
31. Puligummi
32. Rabanda
33. Seelavalasa
34. Thimuruvalasa
35. Uddangi
36. Vankasomidi
37. Vonija
