= Peda Manapuram =

Peda Manapuram Santha Manapuram
- village
- Interactive map of Peda Manapuram
- Location in Andhra Pradesh, India
- Country: India
- State: Andhra Pradesh

Languages
  - Official: Telugu
- Time zone: UTC+5:30 (IST)
- PIN: 535580
- Vehicle registration: AP35

Consists = Police House, Veternary Hospital.

Peda Manapuram is a village panchayat in Dattirajeru mandal of Vizianagaram district in Andhra Pradesh, India.
