= Vizianagaram Fort =

18th-century fort in Andhra Pradesh, India

Vizianagaram fort
- Pusapati fort
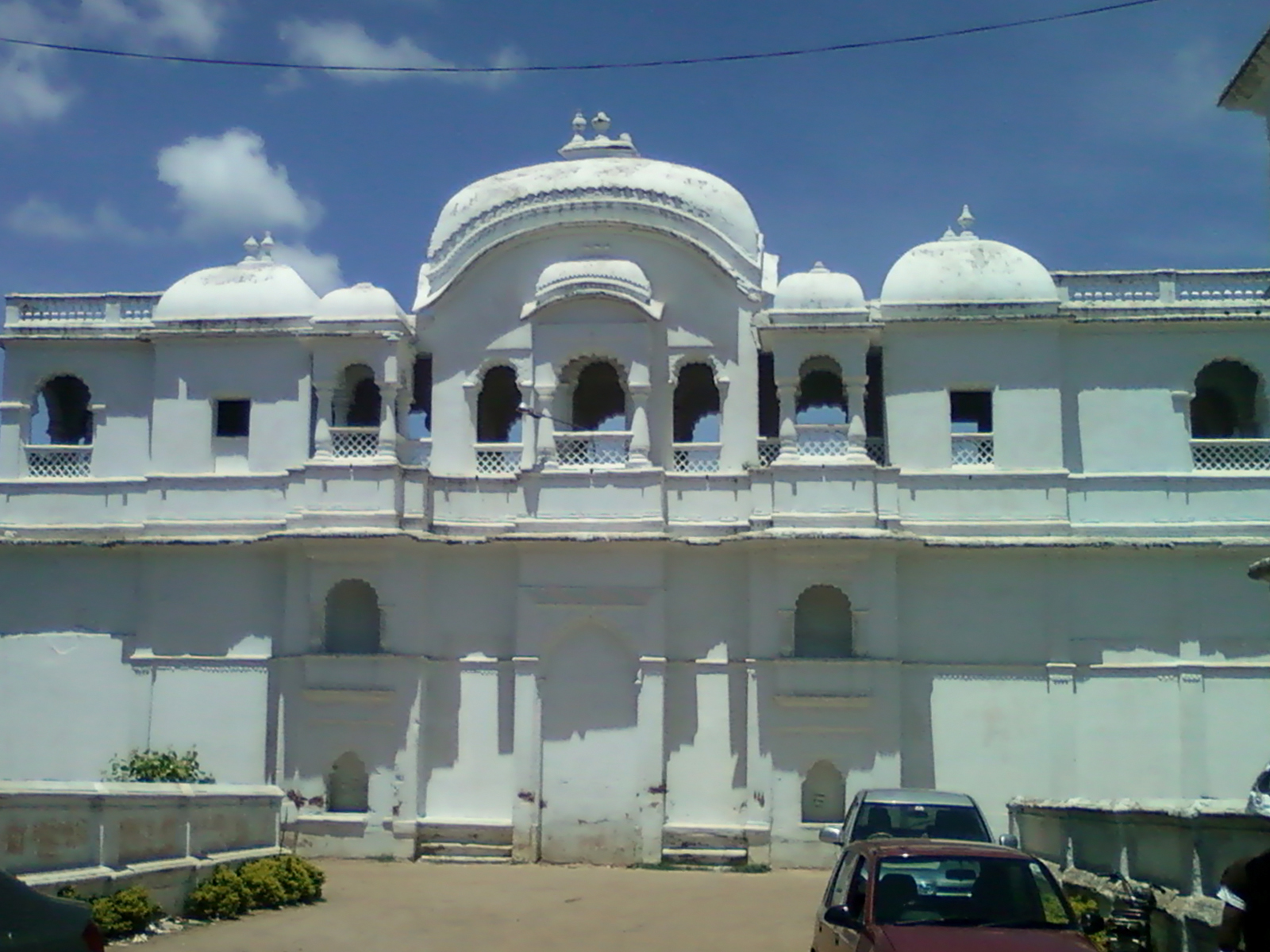
- Vizianagaram fort main entrance

- Location within India
- 18°06′39″N 83°24′38″E
- Type: Fortification
- Location: Vizianagaram, Vizianagram district, Andhra Pradesh, India

History
- Built: 1713
- Abandoned: Occupied

Site notes
- Height: 20 feet (6.1 m)
- Length: 240 feet (73 m)
- Width: 240 feet (73 m)
- Owner: Rajas of Vizianagaram

Vizianagaram fort is an early 18th-century fort in the city of Vizianagaram in northeastern Andhra Pradesh, South India. It was built by Vijaya Rama Raju, the Maharaja of Vizianagaram in 1713. The formal ceremony, while laying the foundation for the fort, was very auspicious as it represented five signs of victory. The square-shaped fort has two main gates, of which the main entry gate (the "Nagar khana") has elaborate architectural features. There are many temples and palaces within the fort and a victory tower. This alternative name is Pusapati.

== Location ==
The fort is situated in Vizianagaram (Telugu language meaning: "the city of victory") about 18 kilometres (11 mi) away from the Bay of Bengal. It is 40 kilometres (25 mi) to the northwest of Visakhapatnam.

== History ==
The Vizianagaram Fort was built in 1713 at a location where five vijayas (Telugu language meaning: "signs of victory") were supposed to be present. It is named after its founder Maharaja Vijay Ram Raju, also known as Ananda Raju I (1671–1717), the Maharaja of Vizianagaram. The site for the fort was suggested to the Maharajas by a Muslim saint, Mahabub Valli, who was doing penance in that forest. The auspicious date chosen for the foundation laying ceremony corresponded, according to the Hindu calendar, to the year known as Vijaya on the tenth day of the Vijaya Dasami when the Dassara Festival is generally held in the country. It was also a Tuesday, which means Jayavaram ("victory day") in Telugu.

== Features ==
The fort, built of stone, is in the shape of a square of side 240 metres (790 ft), and rises to a height of 10 metres (33 ft). The width of the wall at the top varies from 8 to 16 metres (26 to 52 ft). The four corners of the fort have fortifications in the form of bastions made of stones with a slope on its inner face covered with earth fill and strengthened with stone slabs. There are two gates of entry into the fort. The fort entry from the east is the main gate called the "Nagar khana", which has elegant architectural designs. Prior to the construction of the Nagar khana, a victory arch stood at the entrance. The west-facing gate is smaller but with similar architectural features as the main gate. A moat surrounded the fort.

Apart from the two main gates, there are several temples and monuments located within the fort. Two important temples are the Hanuman temple, and the Lakshmi temple known as the "Kota Shakto", which is the guardian deity of the fort. Rajas offered prayers at Lakshmi temple before proceeding on any war campaign. Important monuments are palaces such as the Moti Mahal, Oudh Khana, Alakananda Palace, Korukonda Palace, and, just outside, the victory tower called the "Ghanta Stambham" (Clock Tower). Two other important historical monuments outside the fort, but within the city limits, are the Moddukovillu temple and the Perla Home.

=== Gates ===
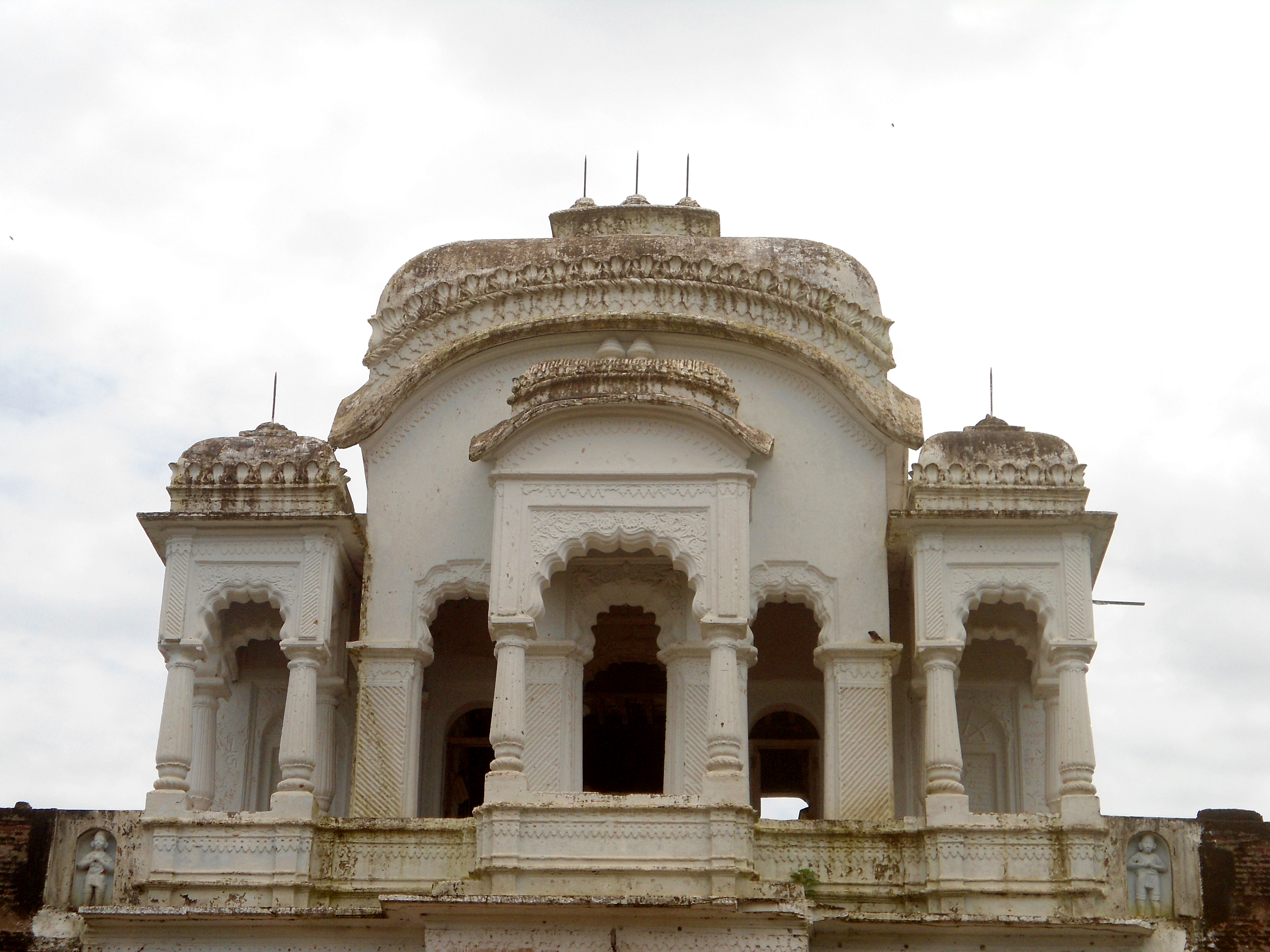
The Western gate of the fort

The two main gates of the fort are architecturally elegant, built in Rajasthani style of architecture. The east main gate is called the "Nagar khana" as it has a drum tower at the top which was used to beat drums to inform the people of royal orders and arrival of royal guests.

The west gate is the rear entrance to the Vizianagaram fort. This gateway is also built in Rajasthani style with a pavilion on top. The gate provides access to the royal tombs, and is a traditional gateway to take out dead bodies for cremation. In place of a moat, which existed in the past, there is now a well-turned park extending to the west gate.

=== Moti Mahal ===
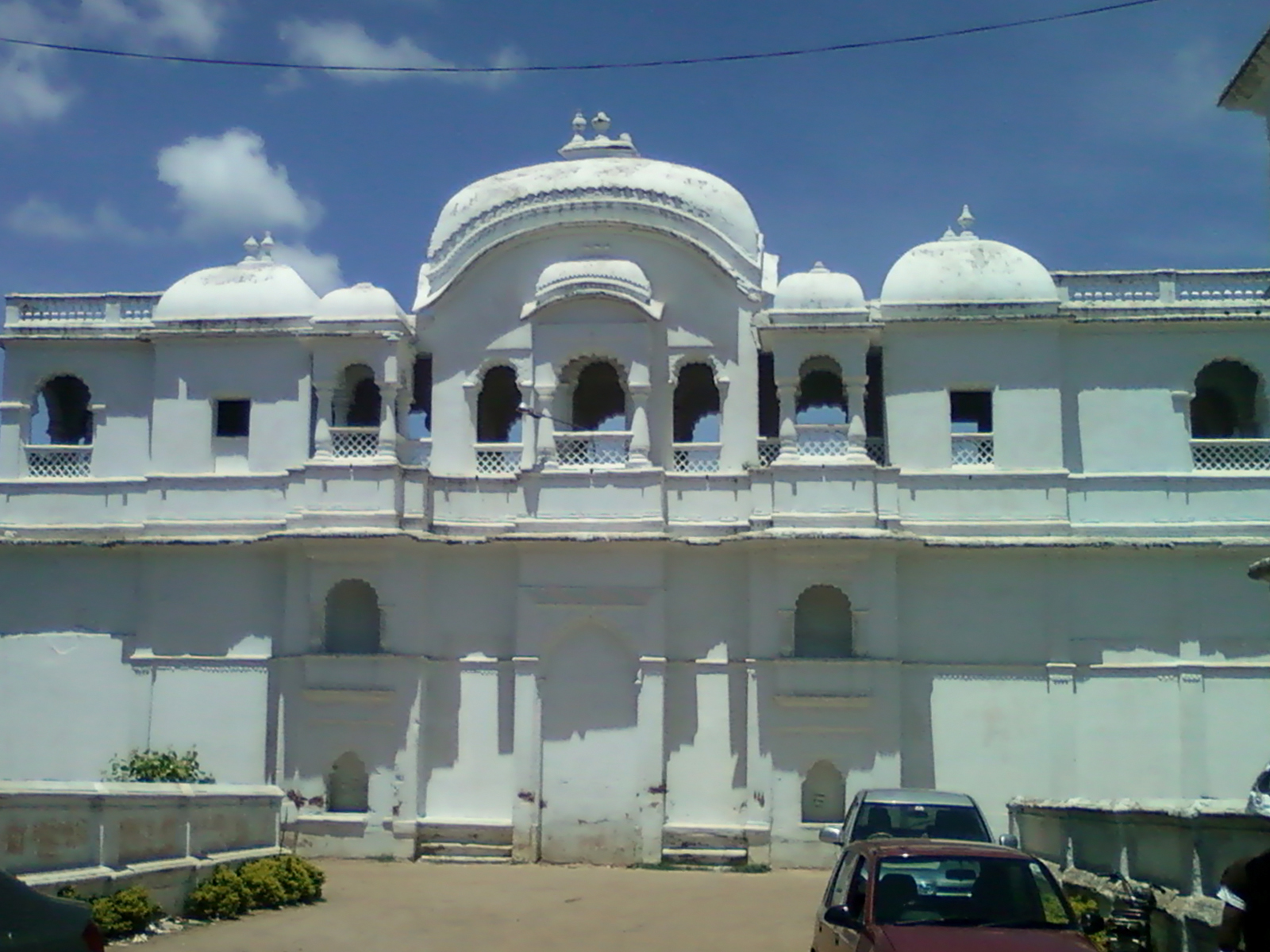
Front view of the Vizianagaram palace in the fort

The Moti Mahal is the royal court or the Durbar hall which was built by Vijayarama Raju-III in 1869. At the entry to this hall, there are two marble statues. This is a monument that represents the past glory, donated to the Maharajah Alak Narayan Society of Arts and Science (MANSAS Trust) by its founder Dr. P.V.G. Raju, the Raja Saheb of Vizianagaram, is now functioning as a college for women on its first floor. It also houses a museum which has artifacts of the past kings who ruled from the fort.

== Other Structures in Vizianagaram ==
=== Oudh Khana ===
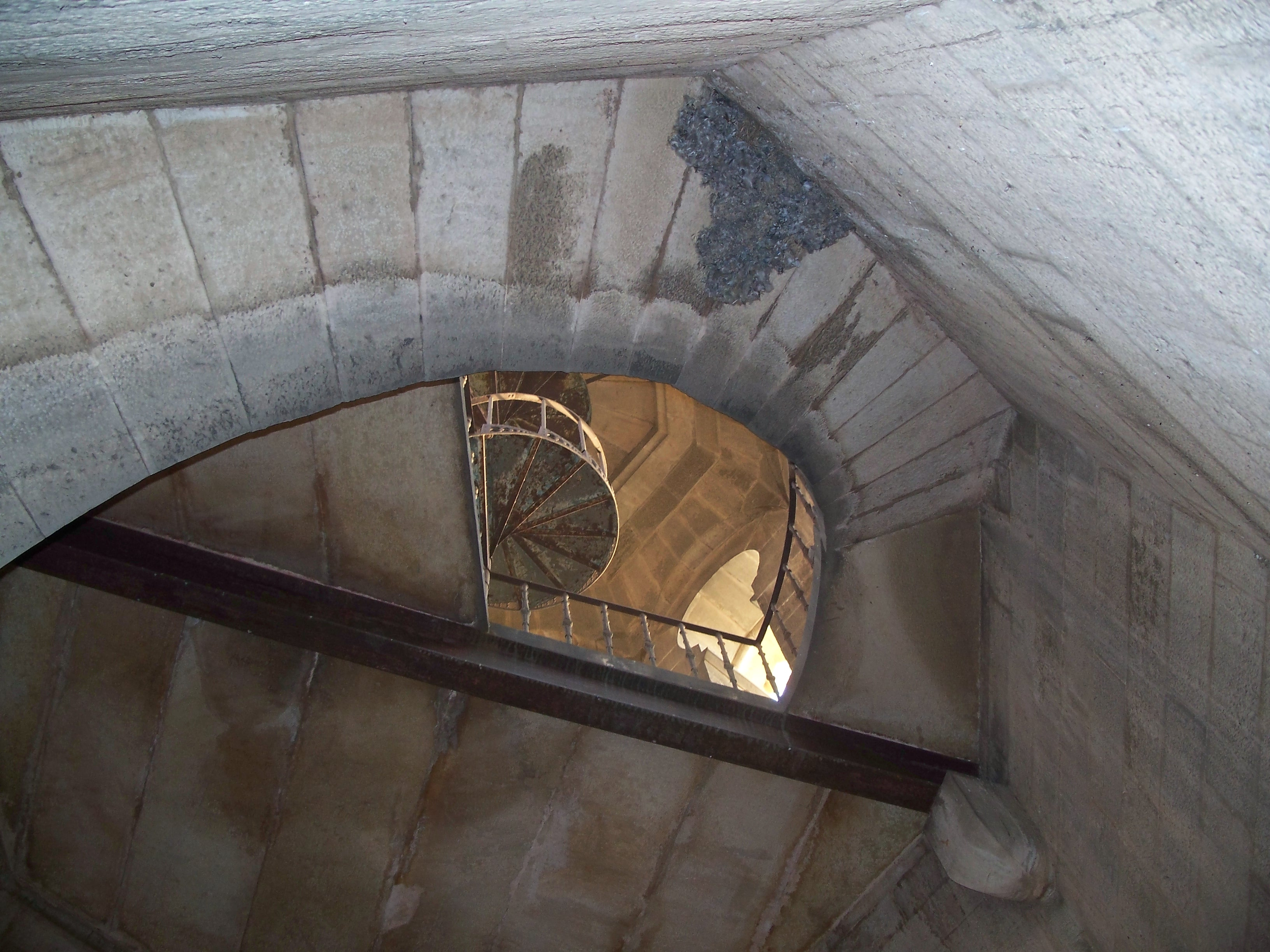
The stairway in the palace bathroom leading to the top

The Oudh Khana is a tower constructed in 1876-77 by Maharaja Vijaya Rama Raju III. It is present in present-day Phool Bagh, Vizianagaram. A unique part of this palace is an exclusive bathroom of the Rajas, which is an octagonal stone structure that adjoins the Phool Bagh Palace. The structure is 50 feet (15 m) in height built with stones and has a spiral stairway which leads to the water tank at the top that is fed by pumping water from a nearby well.

=== Alakananda Palace ===
The Alaknanda Palace was built as a royal guest house. It was constructed in a plush style for the royal guests. It is set within a well laid out garden with walkways. Within the grounds of this palace, an airstrip has been built in recent years for use of the royalty. This palace, however, now houses the 5th Battalion of the Andhra Pradesh Armed Reserve Police.

=== Korukonda Palace ===
Nearer to the Alakananda Palace is the Korukonda Palace. The land around this palace, about 1,000 acres (400 ha) large, is used as a playground and also has well-tended gardens. Educational institutions have been established in this land. Currently the palace is the Sainik School, Korukonda.

=== Ganta Stambham ===
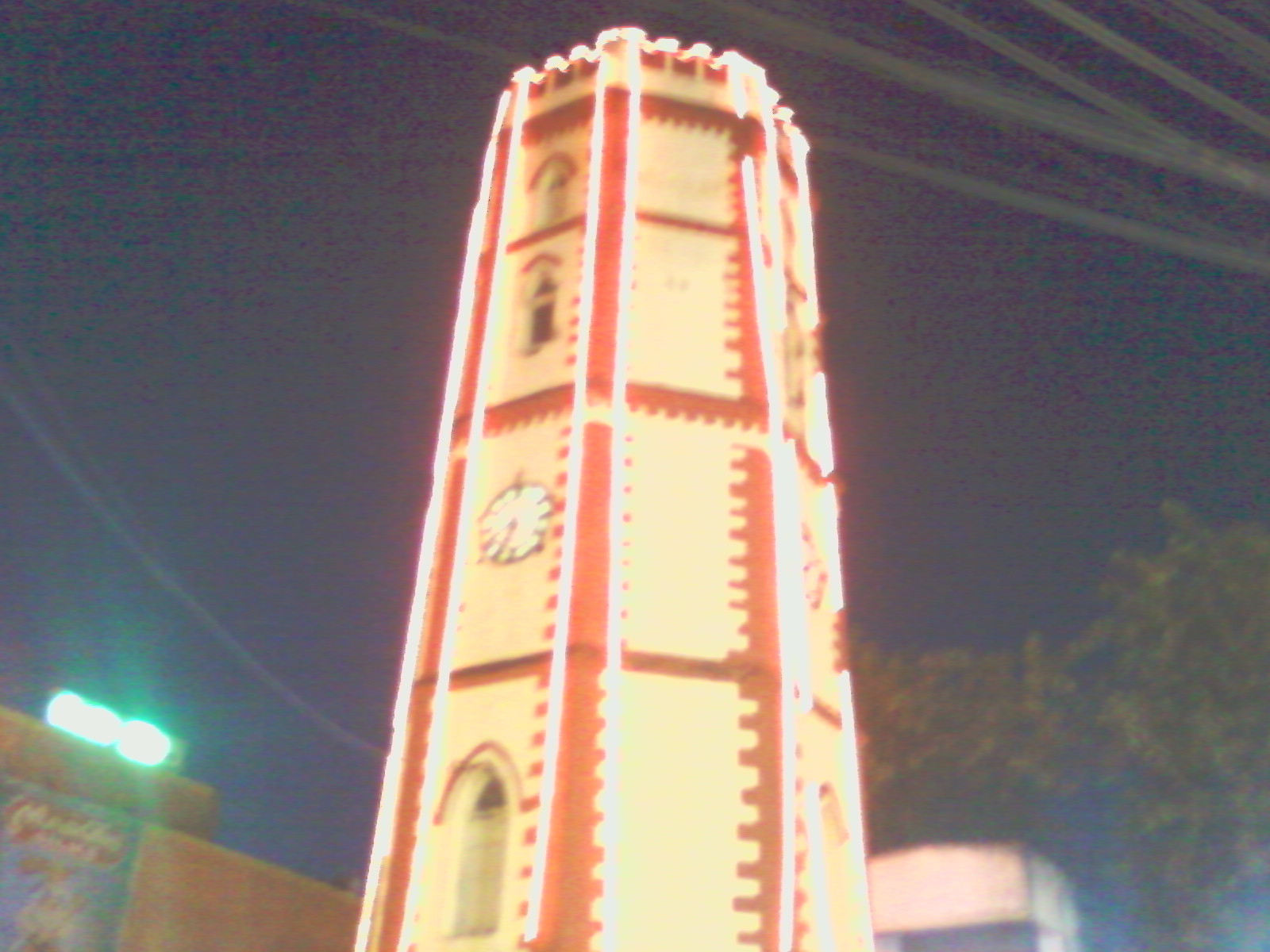
Ganta Stambham or the Clock Tower

Ganta Stambham is the Clock Tower patterned on the lines of the Big Ben in London. The rajas of Vizianagaram, who used to frequent London during the British Raj, built it. It is located just outside the limits of the fort within the heart of the city. The octagonal tower, built of sandstone in 1885, reaches a height of 68 feet (21 m). It was painted white at the top in the past but is now painted cream and red.

=== Other structures ===
Outside the limits of the fort, there is an ancient temple dedicated to goddess Pydithalli Ammavaru which is held in great reverence by the people of the town. It is believed that this deity is the reincarnated form of a daughter of the royal family. The image of the Goddess worshipped in this temple was found on Vijayadashami day in 1752. This day is marked by an annual celebration on 21 and 22 October as a "jatra" or "religious fair". The temple has a Shiva linga in two colours, which is said to exemplify the union of Shiva and Parvati.

Perla Home, also known as the "Perla Vari", constructed in 1895, is said to be one of the most well-maintained monuments in the city. The first building to get electricity connection in the region, it had a bedroom fitted with bedsteads made of silver. A library, which was part of this building, is still functional. The elegant European furniture and the chandeliers of past glory are on display with other artifacts.
