= Andra, Vizianagaram district =

Andra
- Village
- Interactive map of Andra
- Location in Andhra Pradesh, India Andra (India)
- Coordinates: 18.3500°N 83.2000°E
- Country: India
- State: Andhra Pradesh
- District: Vizianagaram
- Elevation: 127 m (417 ft)

Languages
  - Official: Telugu
- Time zone: UTC+5:30 (IST)
- Vehicle registration: AP-35

Andra is a village and panchayat in Mentada mandal, Vizianagaram district of Andhra Pradesh, India.

== Geography ==
Andhra is located at 18.3500°N 83.2000°E. It has an average elevation of 127 meters (419 feet).

== Andra Fort ==
There is an abandoned fort in Andra which was constructed in 1713.

== Andra Reservoir Project ==
Andra Reservoir Project was constructed across River Champavathi. It is located near Andra village. It was constructed during 1983–2000. The Project utilizes 0.980 TMC of the available water and the Reservoir Storage Capacity is about 0.9 TMC. The total ayacut of 9,426 acres (3,815 ha) has been stabilised in Bondapalli, Gajapathinagaram and Mentada Mandals.
