= Santhakavati =

Santhakaviti
- Village
- Interactive map of Santhakaviti
- Location in Andhra Pradesh, India Santhakaviti (India)
- Coordinates: 18°28′09″N 83°45′05″E
- Country: India
- State: Andhra Pradesh
- District: Vizianagaram
- Talukas: Santhakavati

Languages
  - Official: Telugu
- Time zone: UTC+5:30 (IST)
- Vehicle Registration: AP30 (Former); AP39 (from 30 January 2019)

Santhakaviti is a village in Vizianagaram district of the Indian state of Andhra Pradesh. It is located in Santhakaviti mandal of Cheepurupalli revenue division.
