= Honjaram =

Coordinates: 18°27′N 83°48′E

Honjaram honzaram Honjaram
- Village
- Nickname: vanjaram
- Interactive map of Honjaram
- Location in Andhra Pradesh, India
- Country: India
- State: Andhra Pradesh

Languages
  - Official: Telugu
- Time zone: UTC+5:30 (IST)
- Postal code: 532168
- Vehicle registration: AP

Honjaram is a village in Vizianagaram district of the Indian state of Andhra Pradesh. It is located in Santhakaviti mandal.
