= Devudala =

- Village
- Interactive map of Devudala
- Location in Andhra Pradesh, India
- Country: India
- State: Andhra Pradesh
- District: Vizianagaram

Languages
  - Official: Telugu
- Time zone: UTC+5:30 (IST)

Devudala is a village located in Regidi Amadalavalasa mandal in Vizianagaram district, Andhra Pradesh, India.

Devudala's population is around 1496. With sc population of around 362. Its geographical area is approximately 275 hectares. Literacy rate is about 55.07 percentage which is less than average literacy rate of Andhra Pradesh. Devudala could be the mandal head quarter but it wasn't due to its geographical location which is 2km away from the main road. Devudala is having both primary and higher education schools since 1960 and kasturi ba hostel also there for deprived girls in the society. sbi bank cooperative bank for financial needs for village people. Recently cooperative Bank shifted to mandal head quarter due to its locational disadvantage.
