= Thondrangi =

- Village
- Interactive map of Thondrangi
- Location in Andhra Pradesh, India
- Coordinates: 18°14′42″N 83°32′13″E
- Country: India
- State: Andhra Pradesh
- District: Vizianagaram
- Mandal: Garividi

Languages
  - Official: Telugu
- Time zone: UTC+5:30 (IST)
- PIN: 535101

Thondrangi is a village in Vizianagaram district of the Indian state of Andhra Pradesh. It is located in Garividi mandal.
