= Bhogapuram =

- Village
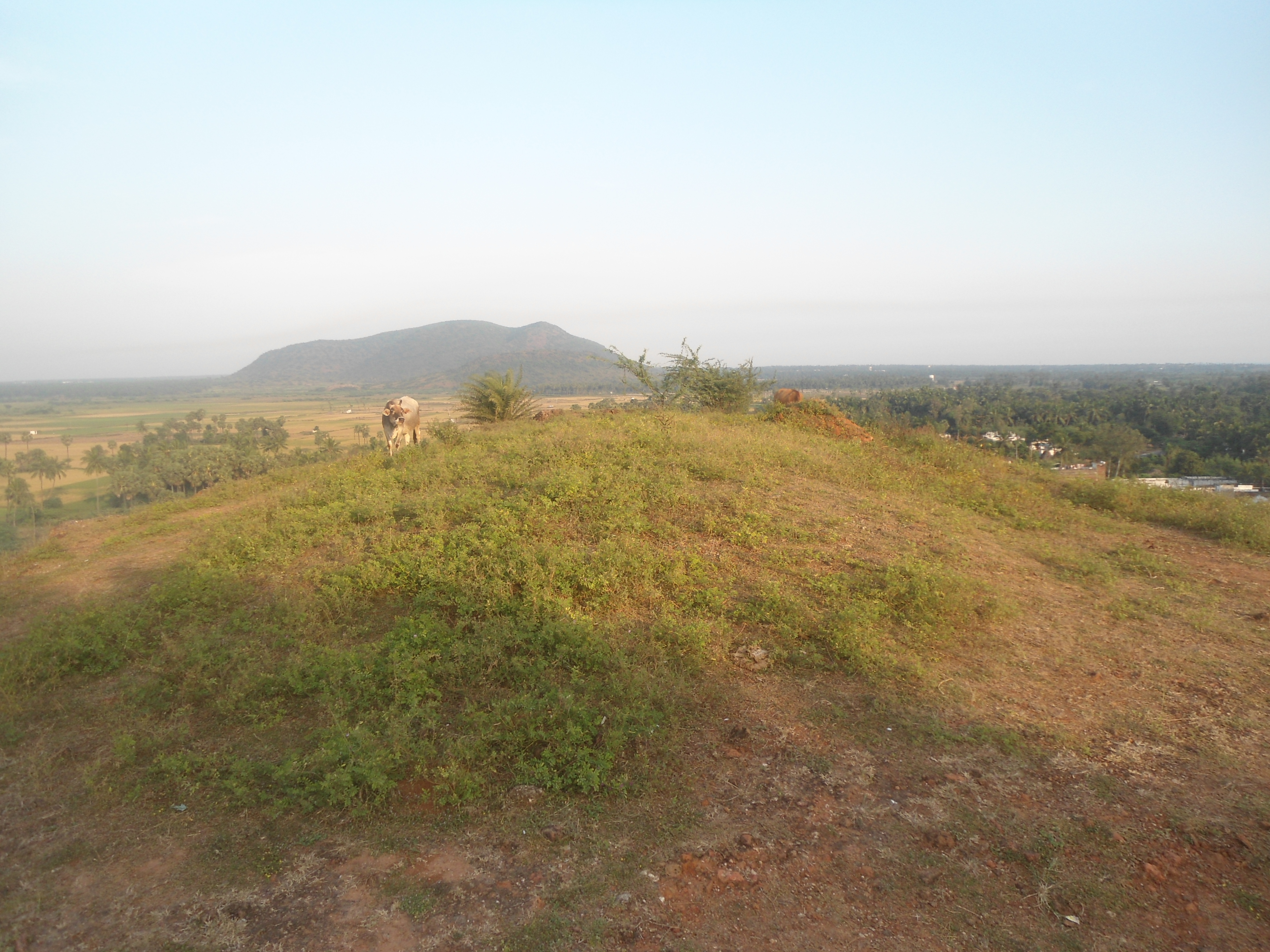
- Gudiwada Dibba Buddhist Stupa Mound in Bhogapuram mandal
- Interactive map of Bhogapuram
- Location in Andhra Pradesh, India Bhogapuram (India)
- Coordinates: 18.0311°N 83.4967°E
- Country: India
- State: Andhra Pradesh
- District: Vizianagaram

Area
  - Total: 20.96 km^{2} (8.09 sq mi)
- Elevation: 21 m (69 ft)

Population (2011)
  - Total: 9,341
  - Density: 445.7/km^{2} (1,154/sq mi)

Languages
  - Official: Telugu
- Time zone: UTC+5:30 (IST)
- PIN: 535 216
- Telephone code: 91 08922
- Vehicle Registration: AP35 (Former); AP39 (from 30 January 2019)

Bhogapuram is a village in Vizianagaram district of the Indian state of Andhra Pradesh. It is located in Bhogapuram mandal of Vizianagaram revenue division.

== Geography ==
Bhogapuram is located at 18.0311°N 83.4967°E and at an altitude of 21 m (69 ft). The village is spread over an area of 20.96 km^{2} (8.09 sq mi).

== Demography ==
As of 2011 census of India, Bhogapuram had a population of 9,341. The total population constitute, 4,645 males and 4,696 females —a sex ratio of 1011 females per 1000 males. 930 children are in the age group of 0–6 years, of which 452 are boys and 478 are girls. The average literacy rate stands at 63.98% with 5,381 literates, significantly higher than the state average of 67.41%.

== Transport ==
Bhogapuram is located on the National Highway 16. Alluri Sitarama Raju International Airport is located here.

== Politics ==
Bhogapuram assembly constituency had 125,856 voters in the 1999 elections. Bhogapuram legislative assembly segment has been merged into Nellimarla legislative assembly segment in 2009.

List of Members of Legislative Assembly:

- 1955 - Botcha Adinarayana
- 1962 - Kommuru Appadu Dora, Indian National Congress
- 1967 - Kommuru Appadu Dora, Indian National Congress
- 1972 - Kommuru Appadu Dora, Indian National Congress
- 1978 - Kommuru Appadu Dora, Indian National Congress
- 1983 - Pathivada Narayana Swamy Naidu, Telugu Desam Party
- 1985 - Pathivada Narayana Swamy Naidu, Telugu Desam Party
- 1989 - Pathivada Narayana Swamy Naidu, Telugu Desam Party
- 1994 - Pathivada Narayana Swamy Naidu, Telugu Desam Party
- 1999 - Pathivada Narayana Swamy Naidu, Telugu Desam Party
- 2004 - Pathivada Narayana Swamy Naidu, Telugu Desam Party
