= Medamarthy =

- Village
- Interactive map of Medamarthy
- Location in Andhra Pradesh, India
- Country: India
- State: Andhra Pradesh
- District: Vizianagaram

Languages
  - Official: Telugu
- Time zone: UTC+5:30 (IST)

Medamarthy is a village in Vizianagaram district of Andhra Pradesh in India.
