= Vizianagaram revenue division =

- revenue division in Vizianagaram district
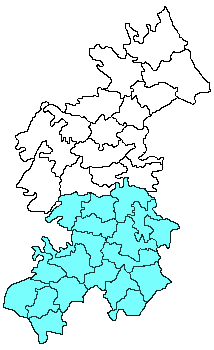
- Vizianagaram revenue division in Vizianagaram district
- Country: India
- State: Andhra Pradesh
- District: Vizianagaram

Vizianagaram revenue division (or Vizianagaram division) is an administrative division in the Vizianagaram district of the Indian state of Andhra Pradesh. It is one of the three revenue divisions in the district with ten mandals under its administration. The divisional headquarters are located at Vizianagaram.

== Mandals ==
The 12 mandals administered under the revenue division are:

No.	Mandals
1	Vizianagaram Urban
2	Gantyada mandal
3	Poosapatirega mandal
4	Denkada mandal
5	Bhogapuram mandal
6	Srungavarapukota mandal
7	Jami mandal
8	Vepada mandal
9	Lakkavarapukota mandal
10	Kothavalasa mandal
11	Bondapalli mandal
12	Vizianagaram Rural

== See also ==
- List of revenue divisions in Andhra Pradesh
- List of mandals in Andhra Pradesh
