= Mentada =

- Village
- Interactive map of Mentada
- Location in Andhra Pradesh, India Mentada (India)
- Coordinates: 18.3167°N 83.2333°E
- Country: India
- State: Andhra Pradesh
- District: Vizianagaram
- Elevation: 104 m (341 ft)

Languages
  - Official: Telugu
- Time zone: UTC+5:30 (IST)
- PIN: 535273
- Vehicle Registration: AP35 (Former); AP39 (from 30 January 2019)

Mentada is a village in Vizianagaram district of the Indian state of Andhra Pradesh, India.

== Geography ==
Mentada is located at 18.3167°N 83.2333°E. It has an average elevation of 104 meters (344 ft). This village is located in Champavathi river basin.

== Demography ==
Mentada mandal had a population of 49,071 in 2001. Males constitute 24,355 and females 24,716. The average literacy rate is 38%. Male literacy rate is 49% and that of females 27%.
