= Vizianagaram mandal =

- Mandal
- Interactive map of Vizianagaram mandal
- Location in Andhra Pradesh, India
- Coordinates: 18.12°N 83.42°E
- Country: India
- State: Andhra Pradesh
- District: Vizianagaram
- Headquarters: Vizianagaram

Population (2011)
  - Total: 283,550

Languages
  - Official: Telugu
- Time zone: UTC+5:30 (IST)
- Vehicle Registration: AP35 (Former); AP39 (from 30 January 2019)

Vizianagaram mandal is one of the 34 mandals in Vizianagaram district of Andhra Pradesh, India. Vizianagaram city is the headquarters of the mandal. The mandal is bounded by Gantyada, Bondapalle, Nellimarla, Denkada, Jami mandals and Visakhapatnam district.

== Towns and villages ==
As of 2011 census, the mandal has 19 settlements. It includes 3 towns, 1 out growths and 15 villages. Vizianagaram (M) is the only town, Jammu Narayanapuram (OG) is the out growth to Vizianagaram (M). K.L.Puram and Gajurlarega (CT) are fully included in Vizianagaram (M).

The settlements in the mandal are listed below:

1. Cheluvuru (R)
2. Duppada (R)
3. Dwarapudi (R)
4. Gunkalam (R)
5. Hazisahebpeta (U)
6. Jaggannadhapuram @ Jonnavalasa (R)
7. Narayanapuram (R) (OG)
8. Kondakarakam (R)
9. Korukonda (R)
10. Malicherla (CT) (R)
11. Pinvemali (R)
12. Rakodu (R)
13. Sarika (R)
14. Siriyalapeta (R)
15. Vizianagaram [M] (U)

Note: M-Municipality, CT-Census town, OG-Out Growth, R-Rural
