= Cheepurupalli revenue division =

Revenue division in Andhra Pradesh, India

- revenue division in Vizianagaram district
- Country: India
- State: Andhra Pradesh
- District: Vizianagaram
- Formed: 4 April 2022
- Founder: Government of Andhra Pradesh
- Time zone: UTC+05:30 (IST)

Cheepurupalli revenue division is an administrative division in the Vizianagaram district of the Indian state of Andhra Pradesh. It is one of the three revenue divisions in the district and comprises nine mandals. It was formed on 4 April 2022 by the Y. S. Jagan Mohan Reddy-led Government of Andhra Pradesh.

== Administration ==
The revenue division comprises nine mandals: Cheepurupalli, Garividi, Gurla, Merakamudidam, Nellamerla, Rajam, Regidi Amadalavalasa, Santhakaviti and Vangara.
