= Dattirajeru =

Coordinates: 18°23′56″N 83°19′17″E

- Village
- Interactive map of Dattirajeru
- Country: India
- State: Andhra Pradesh
- District: Vizianagaram

Languages
  - Official: Telugu
- Time zone: UTC+5:30 (IST)
- Vehicle Registration: AP35 (Former); AP39 (from 30 January 2019)

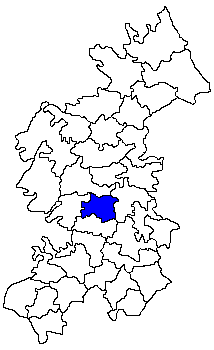
This is a map of the area.

Dattirajeru is a village in Dattirajeru mandal in Vizianagaram district of the Indian state of Andhra Pradesh.
