= Dattirajeru mandal =

- Mandal
- Interactive map of Dattirajeru mandal
- Location in Andhra Pradesh, India
- Coordinates: 18.5667°N 83.3667°E
- Country: India
- State: Andhra Pradesh
- District: Vizianagaram
- Headquarters: Dattirajeru

Population (2011)
  - Total: 54,499

Languages
  - Official: Telugu
- Time zone: UTC+5:30 (IST)

Dattirajeru mandal is one of the 27 mandals in the Vizianagaram district of the state of Andhra Pradesh in India. It is under the administration of the Tiruvuru revenue division and the headquarters are located in Dattirajeru village.

== List of villages in Dattirajeru mandal ==
1. Balabhadra Rajapuram
2. Bhojarajupuram
3. Bhupalarajapuram
4. Cherakupalle
5. China Chamalapalle
6. Chinakada
7. Chowdantivalasa
8. Dasupeta
9. Datti
10. Datti Rajeru
11. Datti Venkatapuram
12. Gadabavalasa
13. Gadasam
14. Gobhyam
15. Gutchim
16. Ingilapalle
17. Kannam
18. Komatipalle
19. Korapa
20. Korapa Kothavalasa
21. Korapakrishna Puram
22. Lakshmipuram
23. Lingarajapuram
24. M.Lingalavalasa
25. Maradam
26. Marrivalasa
27. Neelakanta Rajapuram
28. Pachalavalasa
29. Pappala Lingalavalasa
30. Pedakada
31. Pedamanapuram
32. Porali
33. S. Burjavalasa
34. S.Chintalavalasa
35. Sarayyavalasa
36. Shikaruganji
37. ST valasa
38. Tadendoravalasa
39. Timiteru
40. Timiteru Burjavalasa
41. V. Krishnapuram
42. Vangara
43. Vindhyavasi
44. Viziarama Gajapathi Rajapuram
45. Viziaramapuram
