= Suravaram (surname) =

Suravaram (Telugu: సురవరం) is a Telugu surname:

- Suravaram Pratapareddy (1896–1953), social historian from the Telangana region of Andhra Pradesh, India
- Suravaram Sudhakar Reddy (born 1942), member of the 12th and 14th Lok Sabha of India and represents the Nalgonda
