= Garividi mandal =

- Mandal
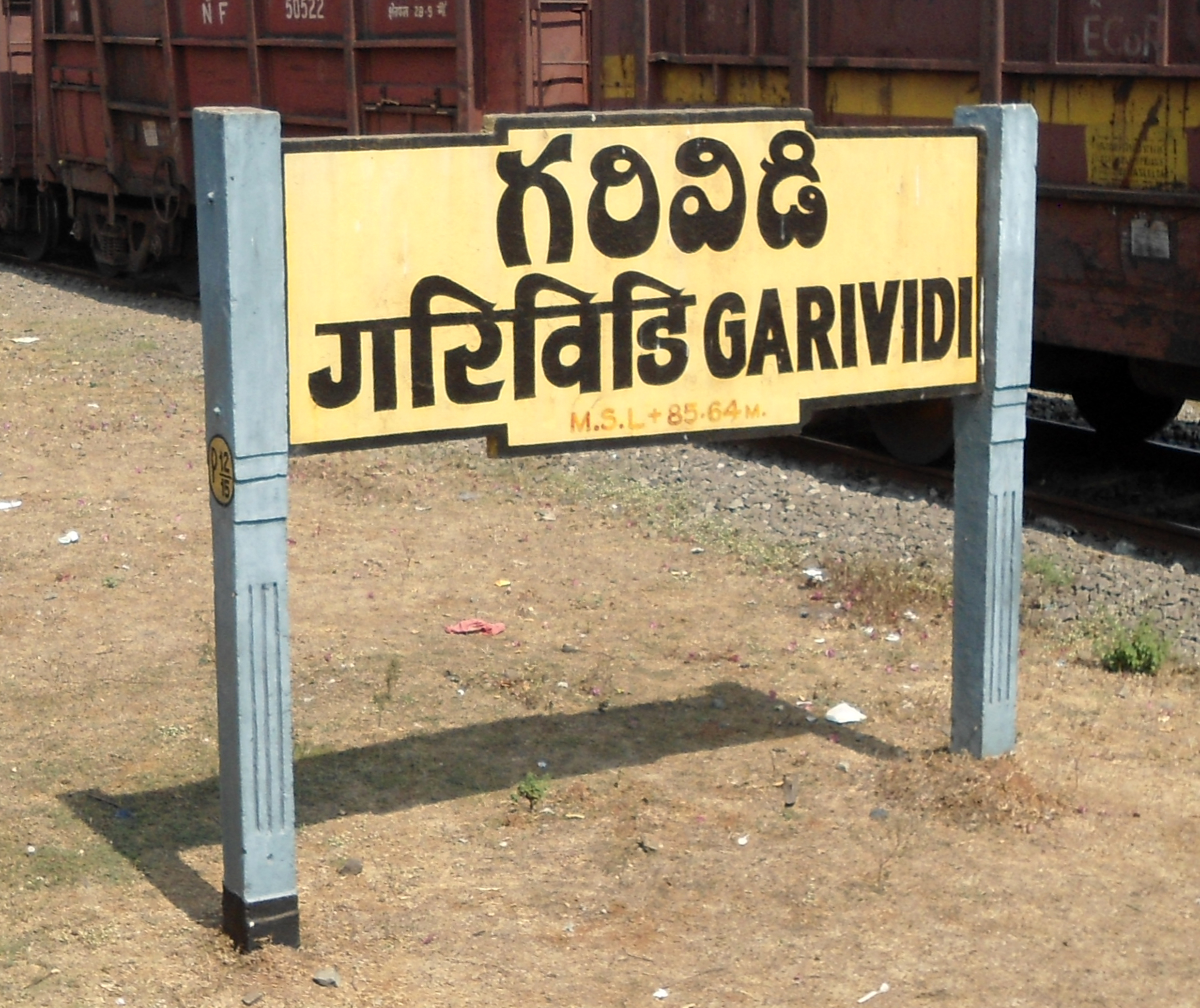
- Garividi railway station name board
- Interactive map of Garividi mandal
- Location in Andhra Pradesh, India Garividi mandal (India)
- Coordinates: 18°17′N 83°33′E
- Country: India
- State: Andhra Pradesh
- District: Vizianagaram

Area
  - Total: 134.69 km^{2} (52.00 sq mi)

Population (2011)
  - Total: 68,289
  - Density: 507.01/km^{2} (1,313.1/sq mi)

Languages
  - Official: Telugu
- Time zone: UTC+5:30 (IST)
- Vehicle Registration: AP35 (Former); AP39 (from 30 January 2019)
- Sub-district LGD code: 4826

Garividi mandal is one of the mandals in Vizianagaram district of the Indian state of Andhra Pradesh.

== Demography ==
This Mandal had a population of 68,289 as of the 2011 Census, consisting of 34,217 males and 34,072 females. The average literacy rate is 97% for males and 90% for females, for a combined average of 94%. Garividi comes under Cheepurupalli Assembly Constituency and Vizianagaram Loksabha constituency.

== Villages in garividi mandal ==
- 1 Appannavalasa
- 2 Arthamuru
- 3 Avagudem
- 4 Baguvalasa
- 5 Bondapalle
- 6 Burravarigollala Palem
- 7 Chandapuram
- 8 Chukkavalasa
- 9 Devada
- 10 Dummeda
- 11 Gadabavalasa
- 12 Gaddapuvalasa
- 13 Gotnandi
- 14 Itamvalasa
- 15 Jagannadhapuram
- 16 K. Palavalasa
- 17 Kapusambham
- 18 Konda Lakshmipuram
- 19 Kondadadi
- 20 Kondasambham
- 21 Konuru
- 22 Kumaram
- 23 Mandiravalasa
- 24 Mokhasaduggi Valasa
- 25 Neeladripuram @ Surammapeta
- 26 Regatiagraharam
- 27 Seripeta
- 28 Sivaram
- 29 Sriramnagar (CT)
- 30 Thatiguda
- 31 Thondrangi
- 32 Vedullavalasa
- 33 Venkupatrunirega
- 34 Vijayarampuram (Near) Kumaram
- 35 Yenuguvalasa
- 36 -Kandipeta
- 37-Duvvam
