= Gajapathinagaram =

- Census Town
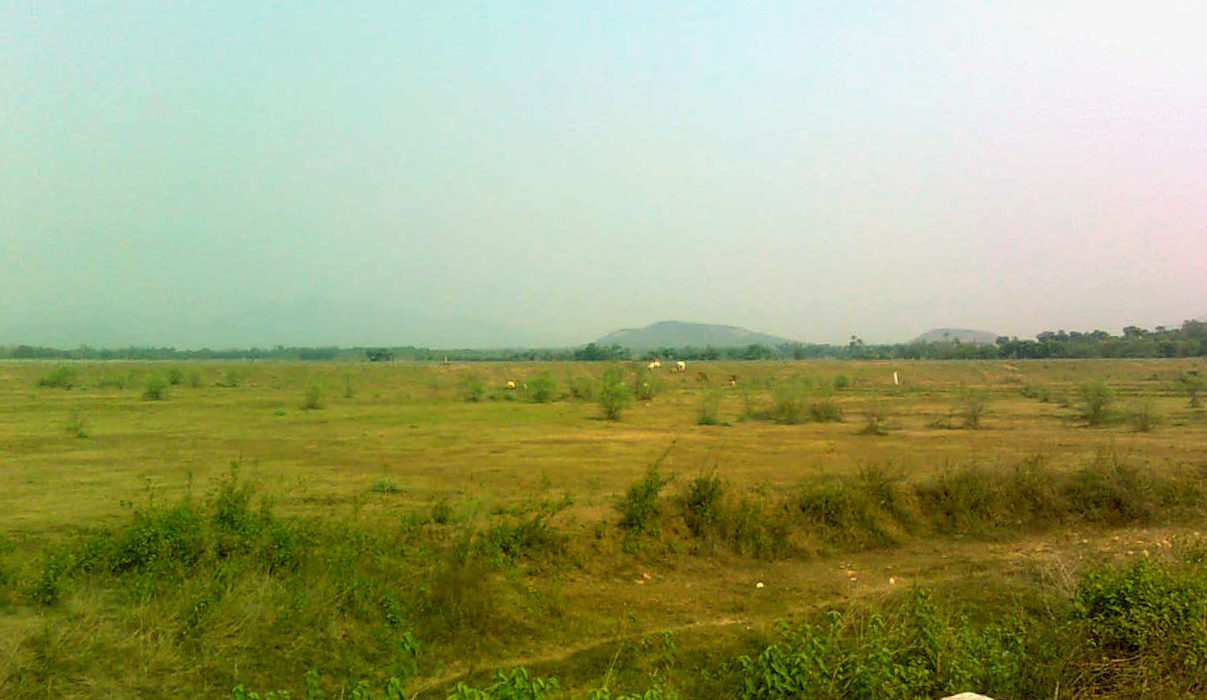
- Dry landscape view at Gajapathinagaram

- Location in Andhra Pradesh, India
- Coordinates: 18.3000°N 83.3333°E
- Country: India
- State: Andhra Pradesh
- District: Vizianagaram

Government
  - MLA: Kondapalli Srinivas

Area
  - Total: 1.04 km^{2} (0.40 sq mi)
- Elevation: 69 m (226 ft)

Population (2011)
  - Total: 5,690
  - Density: 5,470/km^{2} (14,200/sq mi)

Languages
  - Official: Telugu
- Time zone: UTC+5:30 (IST)
- PIN: 535270
- Telephone code: 08965
- Vehicle Registration: AP35 (Former); AP39 (from 30 January 2019)

Gajapathinagaram is a census town in Vizianagaram district of the Indian state of Andhra Pradesh. It is located in Gajapathinagaram mandal of Vizianagaram revenue division. It is located on National Highway 26 between Vizianagaram and Ramabhadrapuram.

== Demographics ==
According to the Imperial Gazetteer, Gajapathinagaram Tahsil in Vizianagaram district had about 228 villages and covered an area of 333 square miles (860 km^{2}). The population in 1901 was 1,34,553, compared with 1,24,057 in 1891.

As of 2001 India census, Gajapathinagaram had a population of 5,282. Males constitute 48% of the population and females 52%. Gajapathinagaram has an average literacy rate of 60%, higher than the national average of 59.5%: male literacy is 67%, and female literacy is 53%. In Gajapathinagaram, 11% of the population is under 6 years of age.

Gajapathinagaram mandal had a population of 56,054 in 2001. Males constitute 27,770 and females 28,284 of the population. The average literacy rate of the mandal population is 45%. Male literacy rate is 56% and that of females 34%.

There are 35 revenue villages and 28 panchayats in this mandal.

== Legislative Assembly ==
List of Members of Legislative Assembly:

- 1955 - Kusuma Gajapathi Raju and Gantyana Suryanarayana
- 1962 -Taddi sanyasinaidu and
- 1967 and 1972 - Penumatsa Sambasiva Raju
- 1978 and 1985 - Vangapandu Narayanappala Naidu
- 1983 - Jampana Satyanarayana Raju
- 1999 - Thadi Sanyasi Appala Naidu
- 1989, 1994 and 2004 - Padala Aruna
- 2009 - Botcha Appala Narasaiah
- 2014 - K A NAIDU
- 2019 - Botcha Appala Narasaiah
- 2024 - Kondapalli Srinivas

== Education ==
The primary and secondary school education is imparted by government, aided and private schools, under the School Education Department of the state. The medium of instruction followed by different schools are English, Telugu.
