= Maharajah's Government Sanskrit College, Vizianagaram =

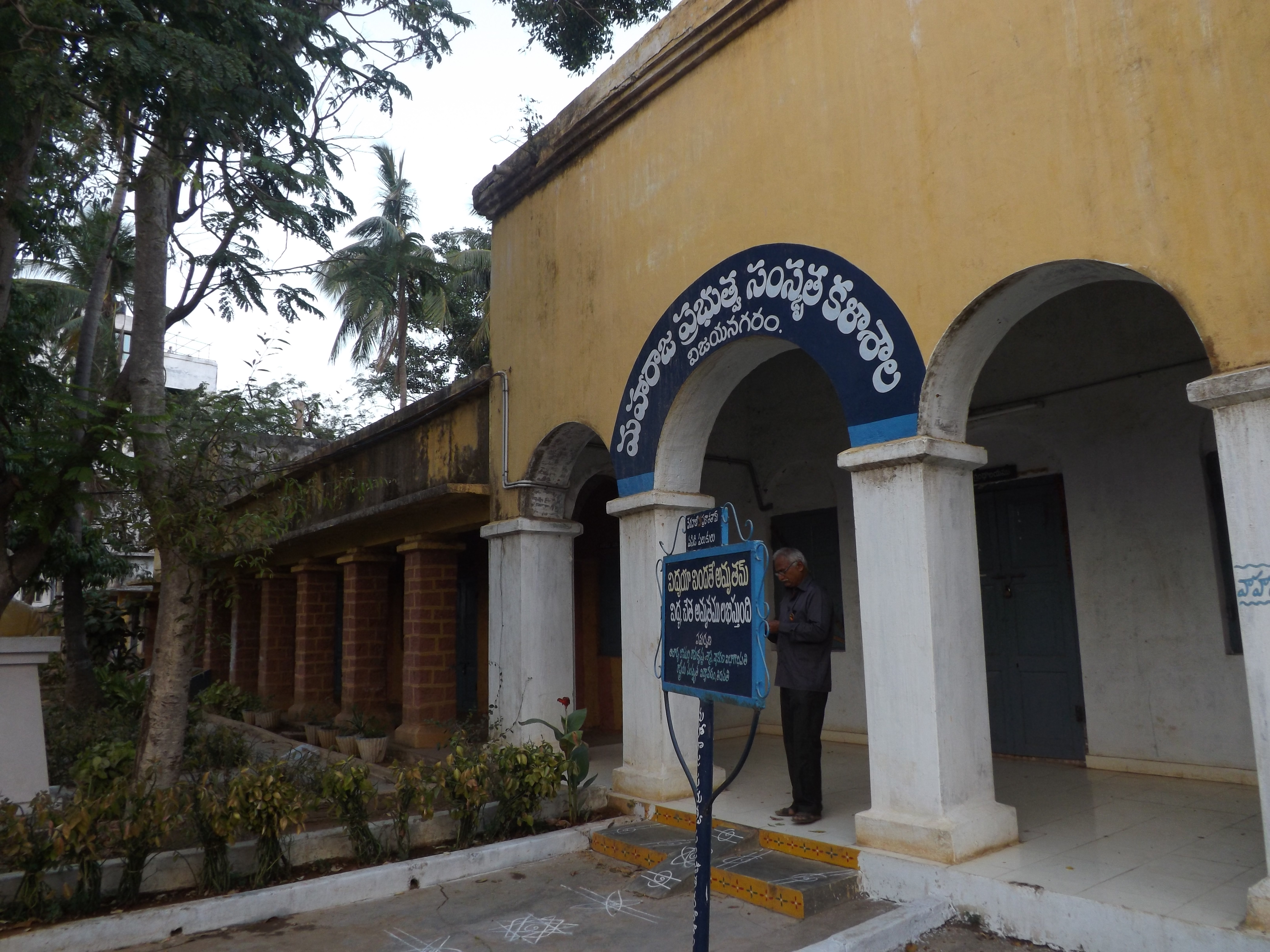
Sanskrit College of Vijayanagaram.

Maharajah's Government Sanskrit College, Vizianagaram shortly M.R.Govt.Sanskrit College is a unique college established with the aim of teaching Sanskrit language and Oriental studies. It is one of the oldest colleges in India with more than 150 years of history.

It was established in 1860, by the Pusapati rulers of Vizianagaram.

The Maharaja Alak Narayana Society of Arts and Science (MANSAS) Trust, which was established by P.V.G. Raju on 12 November 1958, was instrumental for the development of the college.

During the recent years, there is declining interest in the government and public about the Sanskrit education, the college has got only single digit students. However, as a result of building public awareness and clearing some of the misconceptions, it has picked up again.
