= Vizianagaram =

Vizianagaram Vijayanagaram
- City
- Vizianagaram
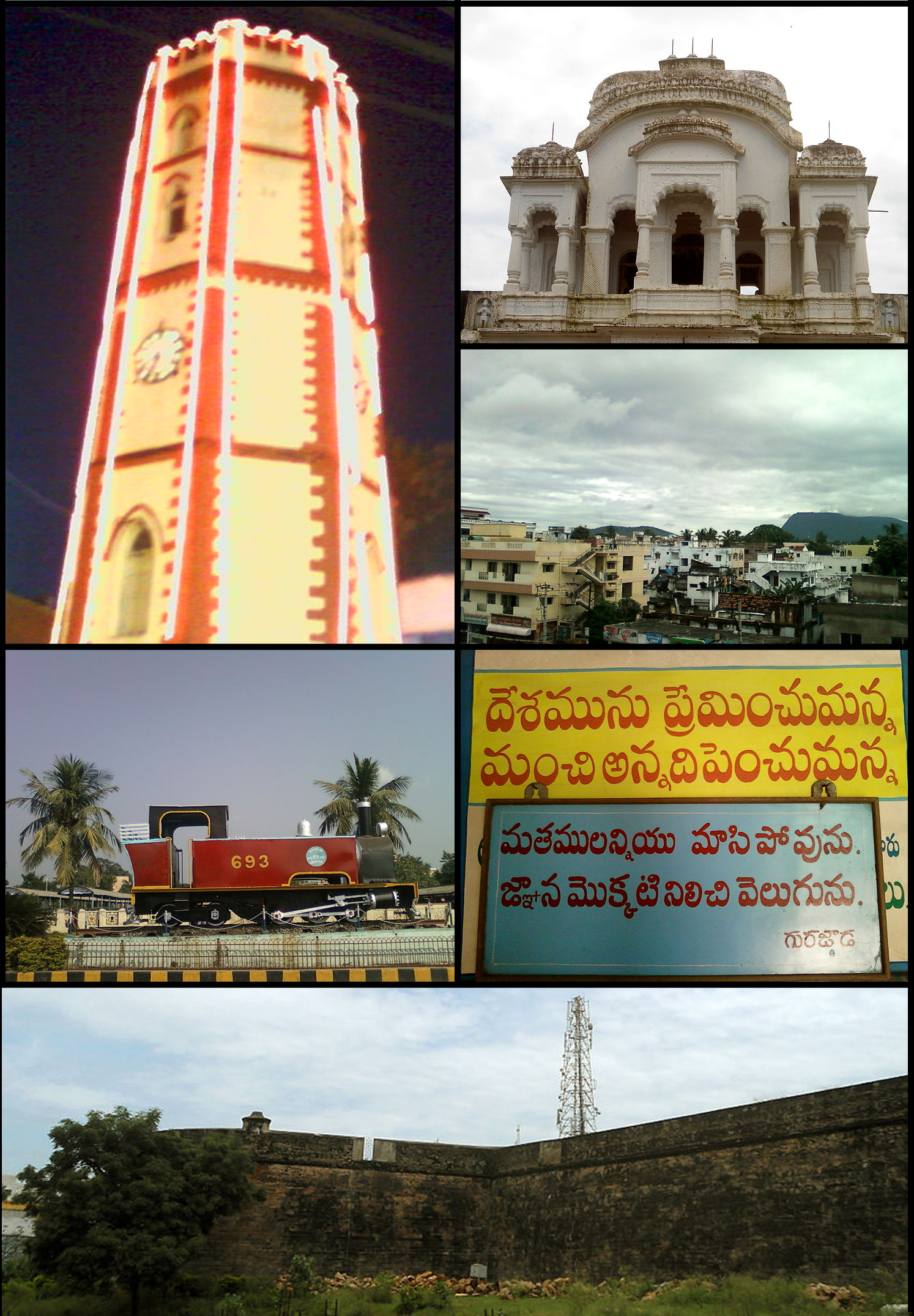
- Clockwise from Top Left: Clock Tower (Ganta stambham), Vizianagaram Fort Balcony, View of Vizianagaram Town, Writings of the great writer Gurajada Apparao, Vizianagaram Fort Walls, Replica of a steam engine at Vizianagaram railway station
- Nickname: Vizianagaram
- Location in Andhra Pradesh, India
- Coordinates: 18.1159°N 83.406°E
- Country: India
- State: Andhra Pradesh
- District: Vizianagaram
- Incorporated (Municipality): 1888
- Founder: Vijayaram Raj
- Wards: 50

Government
  - Type: Mayor–Council
  - Body: Vizianagaram Municipal Corporation, Visakhapatnam Metropolitan Region Development Authority
  - MLA: Aditi Vijaya Lakshmi Gajapathi Raju
  - MP: Appalanaidu Kalisetti

Area
  - Total: 29.27 km^{2} (11.30 sq mi)

Population (2011)
  - Total: 228,025
  - Rank: 13th (in AP)

Literacy

Languages
  - Official: Telugu
- Time zone: UTC+5:30 (IST)
- PIN: 535001 - 535006
- Area code: +91–8922
- Vehicle Registration: AP35 (Former); AP39 (from 30 January 2019)
- Website: https://vizianagaram.ap.gov.in/public-utility-category/municipality/

Vizianagaram, also known as Vijayanagaram (Telugu: [ʋidʒɐjɐnɐɡɐrɐw̃]), is a city and the headquarters of the Vizianagaram district in the Indian state of Andhra Pradesh. It is located in the Eastern Ghats, about 24 km (15 mi) west of the Bay of Bengal and 40 km (25 mi) north-northeast of Visakhapatnam. The city has a population of 228,025 and was established as the capital of the Vizianagaram estate by Raja Vijayaram Raj from the Pusapati dynasty. The rulers had a notable role in the history of the region in the 18th century and were patrons of education and arts.

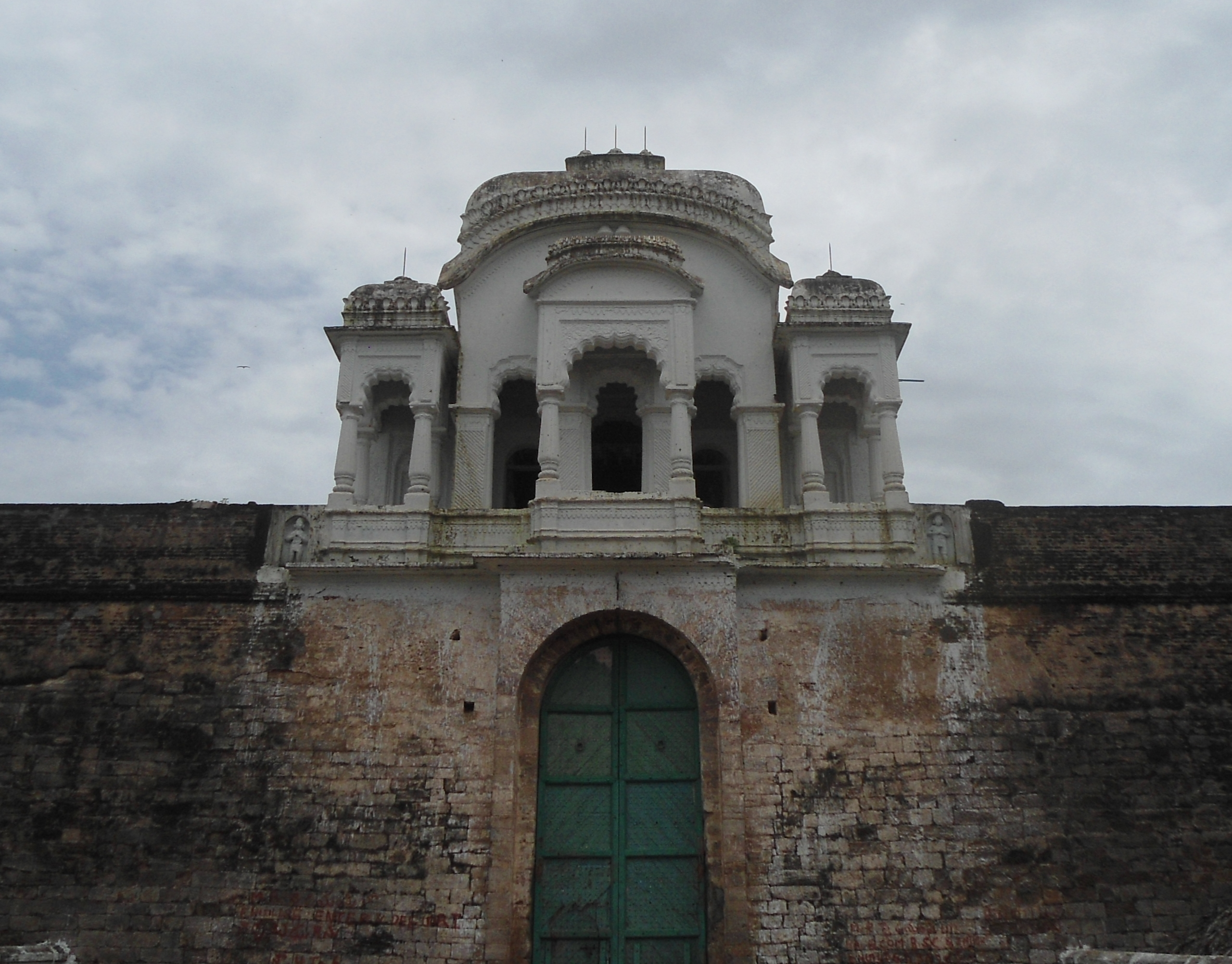
West Entrance of the Vizianagaram fort in Andhra Pradesh

== History ==
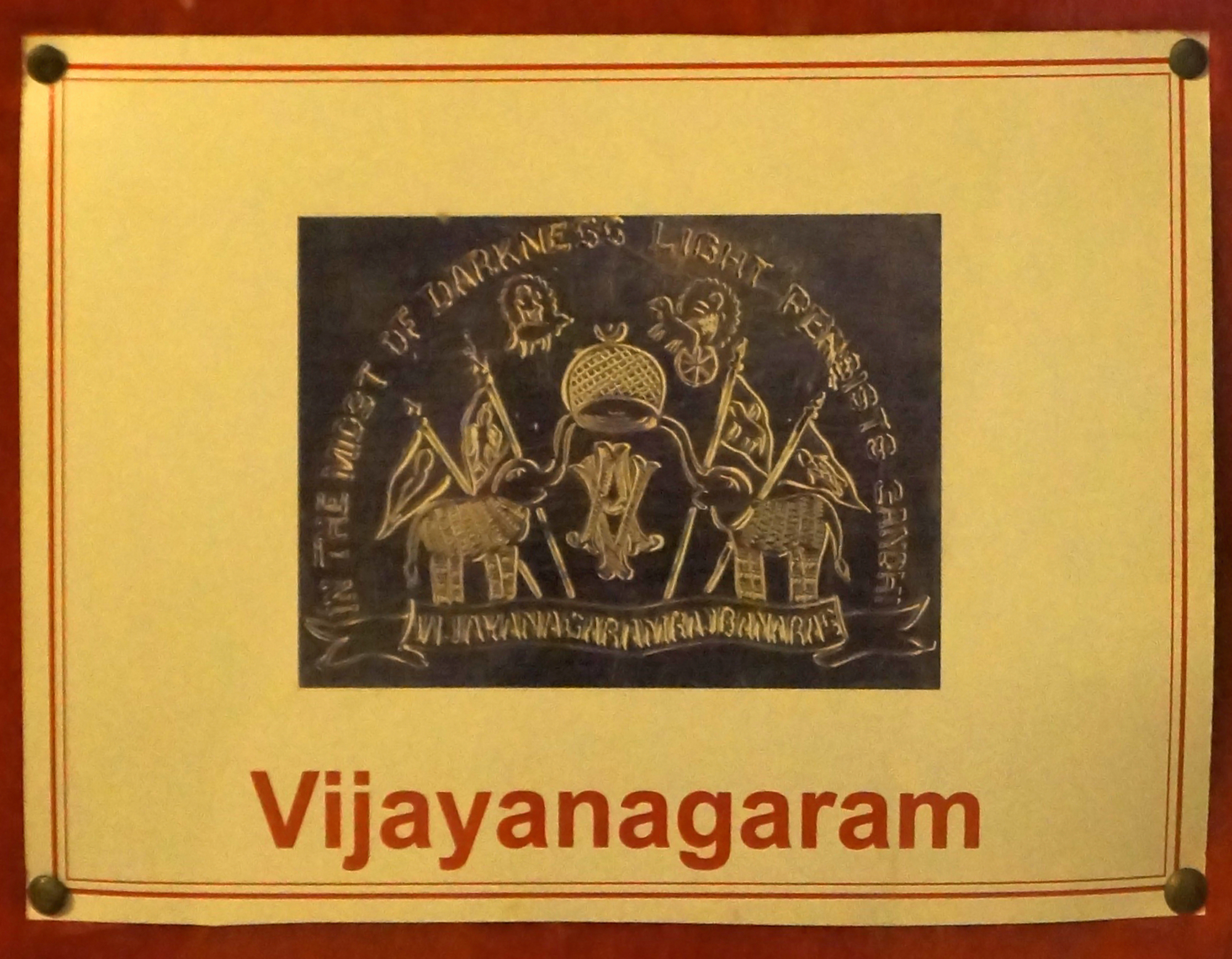
Coat of arms of the Vizianagaram kingdom

Excavations at this town revealed copper coins belonging to the remains of 900 B.C. (Kalinga period).

Vizianagaram Princely State was ruled by Pusapati Kings & Gajapati Maharajas. Maharaja Vijayarama Gajapati Raju was a notable King. They are Suryavanshi Kshatriyas. Their ancestors are Udaipur Maharanas. Buddhist and Jain remains were excavated around hills near Ramateertham village.

== Demographics ==
As of the 2011 Census of India, the town had a population of 227,533. The total population constituted 111,596 males and 115,937 females—a sex ratio of 1,039 females per 1,000 males, higher than the national average of 940 per 1,000. 20,487 children are in the age group of 0–6 years, of which 10,495 are boys and 9,992 are girls. The average literacy rate stood at 81.85% with 169,461 literates, significantly higher than the national average of 73.00%.

== Governance ==
Vizianagaram Municipal Corporation

=== Civic administration ===
The Vizianagaram Municipal Corporation is the civic body of the city, constituted as a municipality in 1888 before being upgraded to corporation on 9 December 2015. The jurisdictional area of the corporation is spread over 29.27 km^{2} (11.30 mi^{2}) with 38 election wards. During 2010–11, the municipality spent ₹1,887.75 crore (US$200 million) and generated ₹2,367.51 crore (US$250 million).

=== Utility services ===
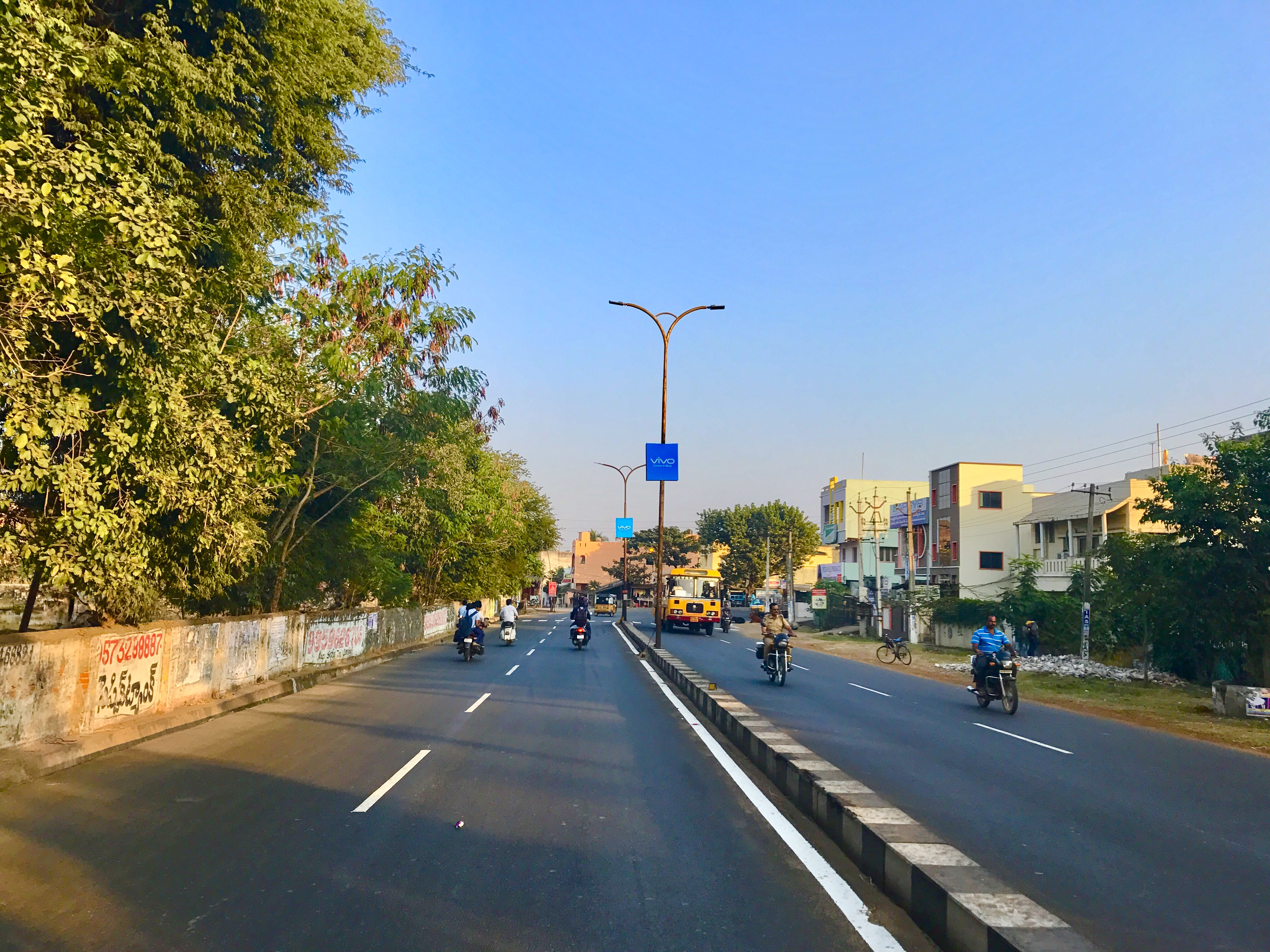
SH-26 towards Visakhapatnam in Vizianagaram

Utility services include a water supply, sewer connections, drainage systems, parks, grounds, community centres, and healthcare. The municipality maintains 458 public taps, 749 bore–wells, 330 km (210 mi) of roads, 243.25 km (151.15 mi) of drains, 32 parks, 2 playgrounds, 49 elementary and 3 secondary schools and 1 maternity and child health centre.

== Transport ==
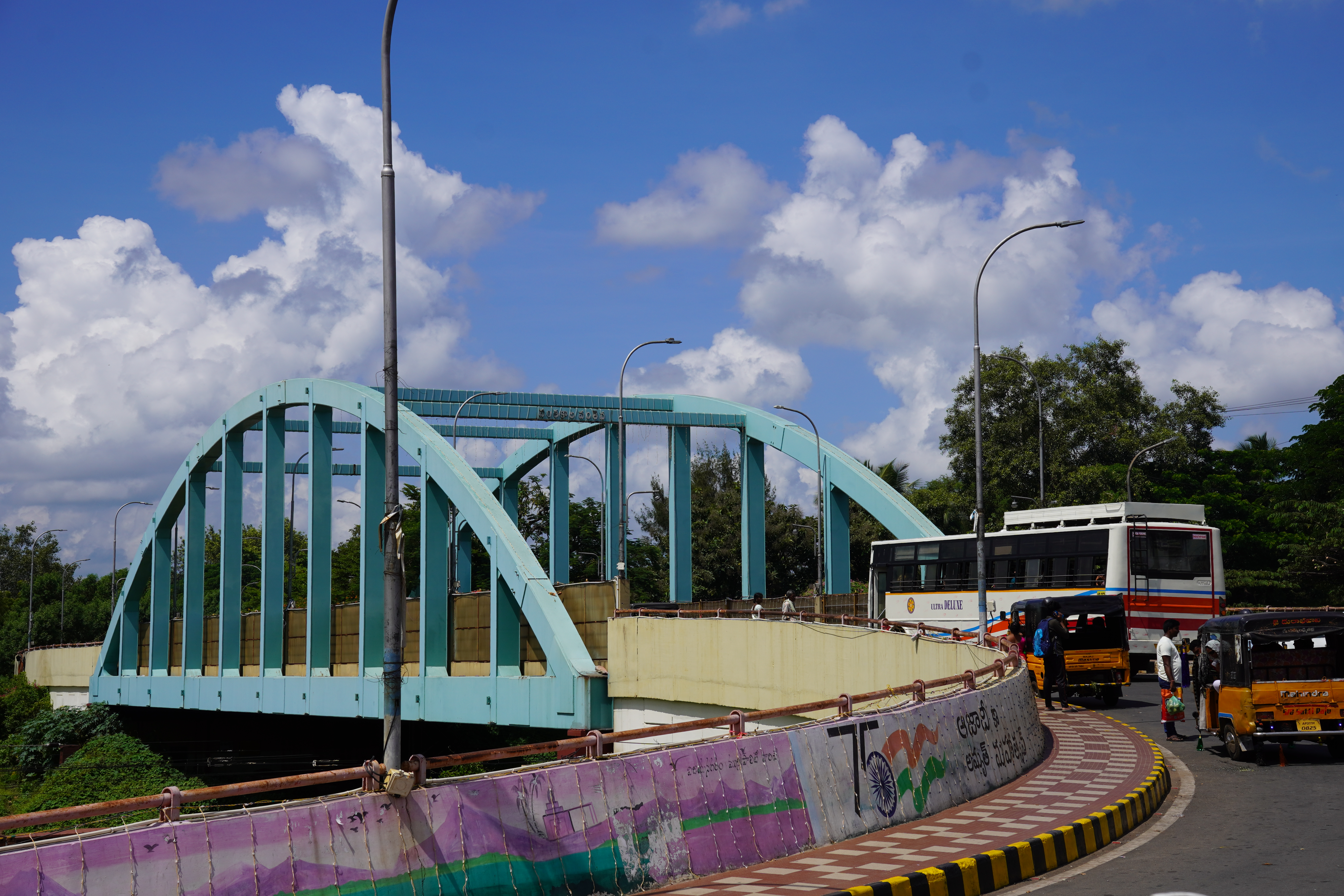
Signature Bridge

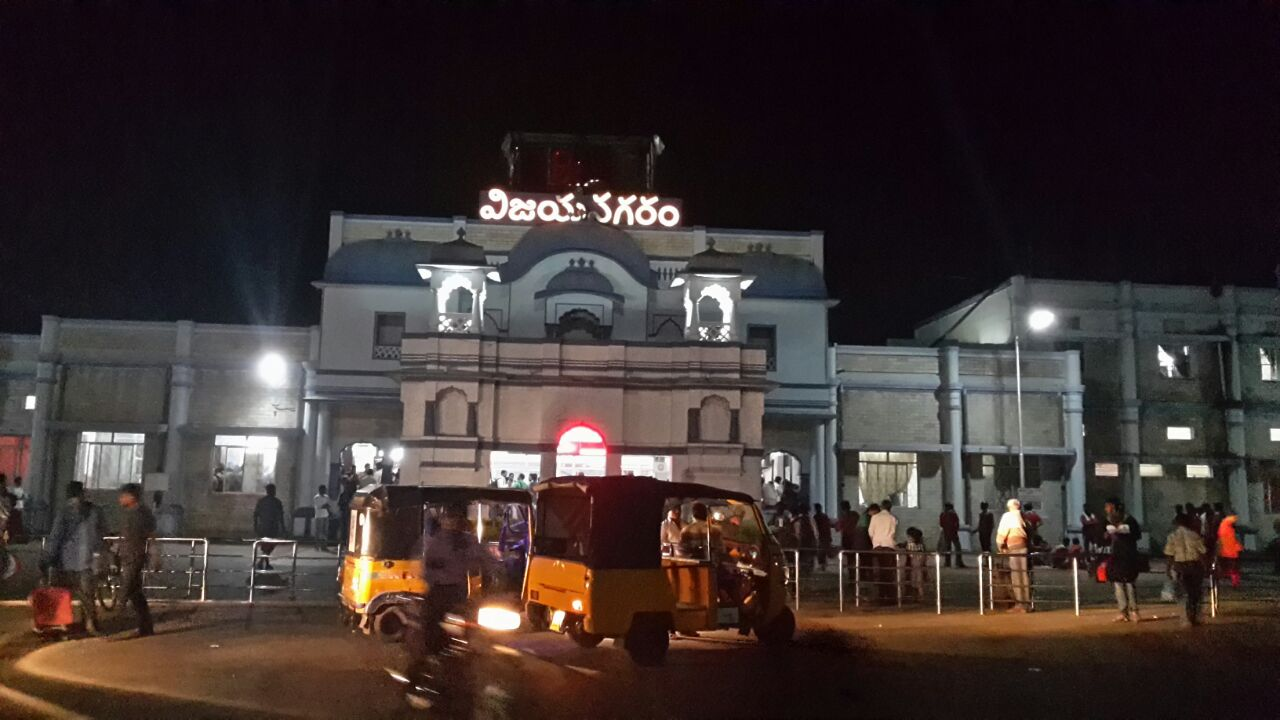
Vizianagaram Railway Station

=== Roadways ===
The city has a total road length of 317.80 km. The Andhra Pradesh State Road Transport Corporation operates bus services from Vizianagaram bus station.

=== Railways ===
There is a Railway Station in the city, called Vijayanagaram Junction Railway Station, Code : VZM, in the division of East Coast Railways, giving it immediate access to several other parts of the state.

== Education ==
The primary and secondary school education is imparted by government, aided and private schools of the School Education Department of the state.

Vizianagaram has educational institutions, including:

- Maharajah's College
- Maharajah's Government College of Music and Dance
- Maharajah's Government Sanskrit College
- Maharajah Institute of Medical Sciences
- Jawaharlal Nehru Technological University - Gurajada, Vizianagaram
- MVGR College of Engineering

== Culture ==
The Sirimanothsavam takes place every year in Vizianagaram along with the Vizianagaram Utsav at the Vizianagaram Fort.

== Geography ==
Vizianagaram is located at 18.12°N 83.42°E. It has an average elevation of 74 metres (242 feet). The Champavathi River flows near the city.

=== Climate ===
Vizianagaram has a tropical savanna climate (Köppen climate classification Aw) characterised by high humidity nearly year-round, with oppressive summers and good seasonal rainfall. The summer season extends from March to May, followed by monsoon season, which continues to September. October and November constitute the post-monsoon or retreating monsoon season. The normal rainfall of the district for the year is 1,131.0 mm, as compared to the actual rainfall of 740.6 mm received during 2002–2003. The district gets the benefit of both the southwest and northeast monsoon. The season from December to February generally has fine weather.

Climate data for Vizianagaram, Andhra Pradesh
Month	Jan	Feb	Mar	Apr	May	Jun	Jul	Aug	Sep	Oct	Nov	Dec	Year
Mean daily maximum °C (°F)	27.6 (81.7)	29.4 (84.9)	32.1 (89.8)	33.8 (92.8)	34.8 (94.6)	33.9 (93.0)	31.6 (88.9)	31.5 (88.7)	31.4 (88.5)	31.0 (87.8)	29.0 (84.2)	27.3 (81.1)	31.1 (88.0)
Mean daily minimum °C (°F)	18.2 (64.8)	20.6 (69.1)	23.4 (74.1)	25.8 (78.4)	27.5 (81.5)	27.2 (81.0)	26.0 (78.8)	25.9 (78.6)	25.5 (77.9)	24.4 (75.9)	21.0 (69.8)	18.4 (65.1)	23.7 (74.6)
Average rainfall mm (inches)	11 (0.4)	7 (0.3)	11 (0.4)	19 (0.7)	77 (3.0)	132 (5.2)	157 (6.2)	172 (6.8)	204 (8.0)	245 (9.6)	57 (2.2)	5 (0.2)	1,097 (43)
Source: Climate-Data.org

Vizianagaram has been ranked 24th best “National Clean Air City” under (Category 3 population under 3 lakhs cities) in India.

== See also ==
- List of cities in Andhra Pradesh by population
- List of municipalities in Andhra Pradesh
