= Vizianagaram district =

- District of Andhra Pradesh
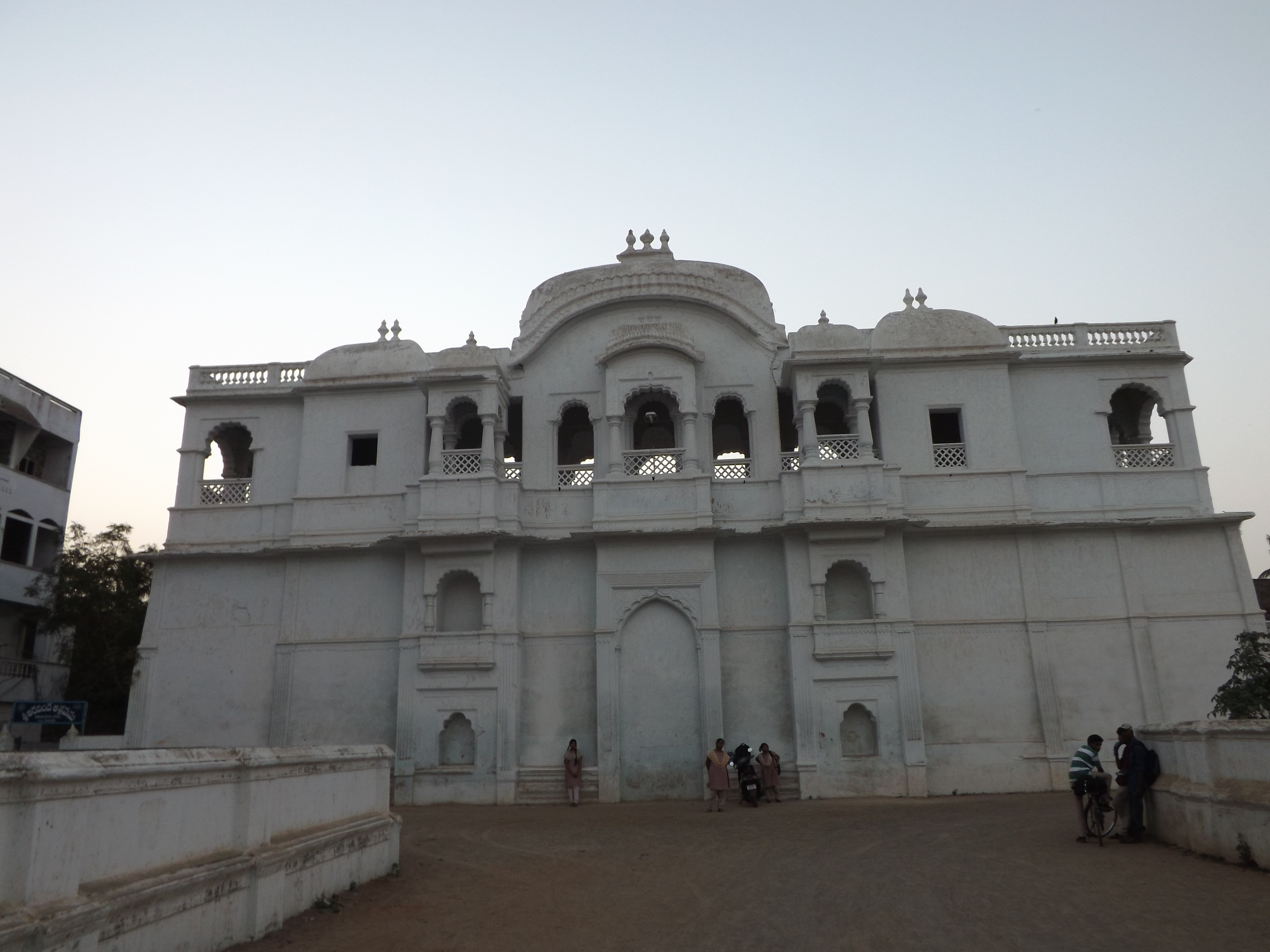
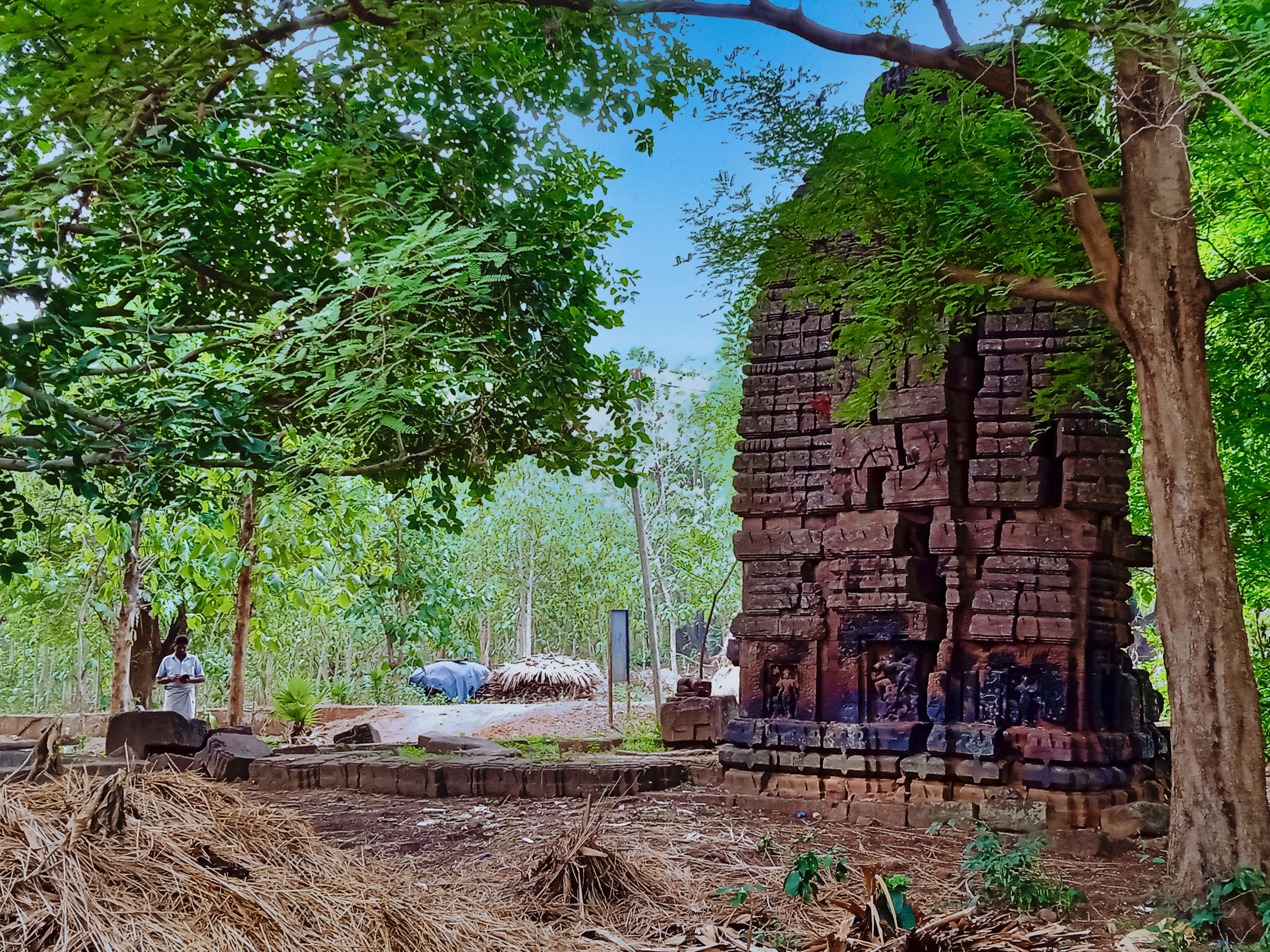
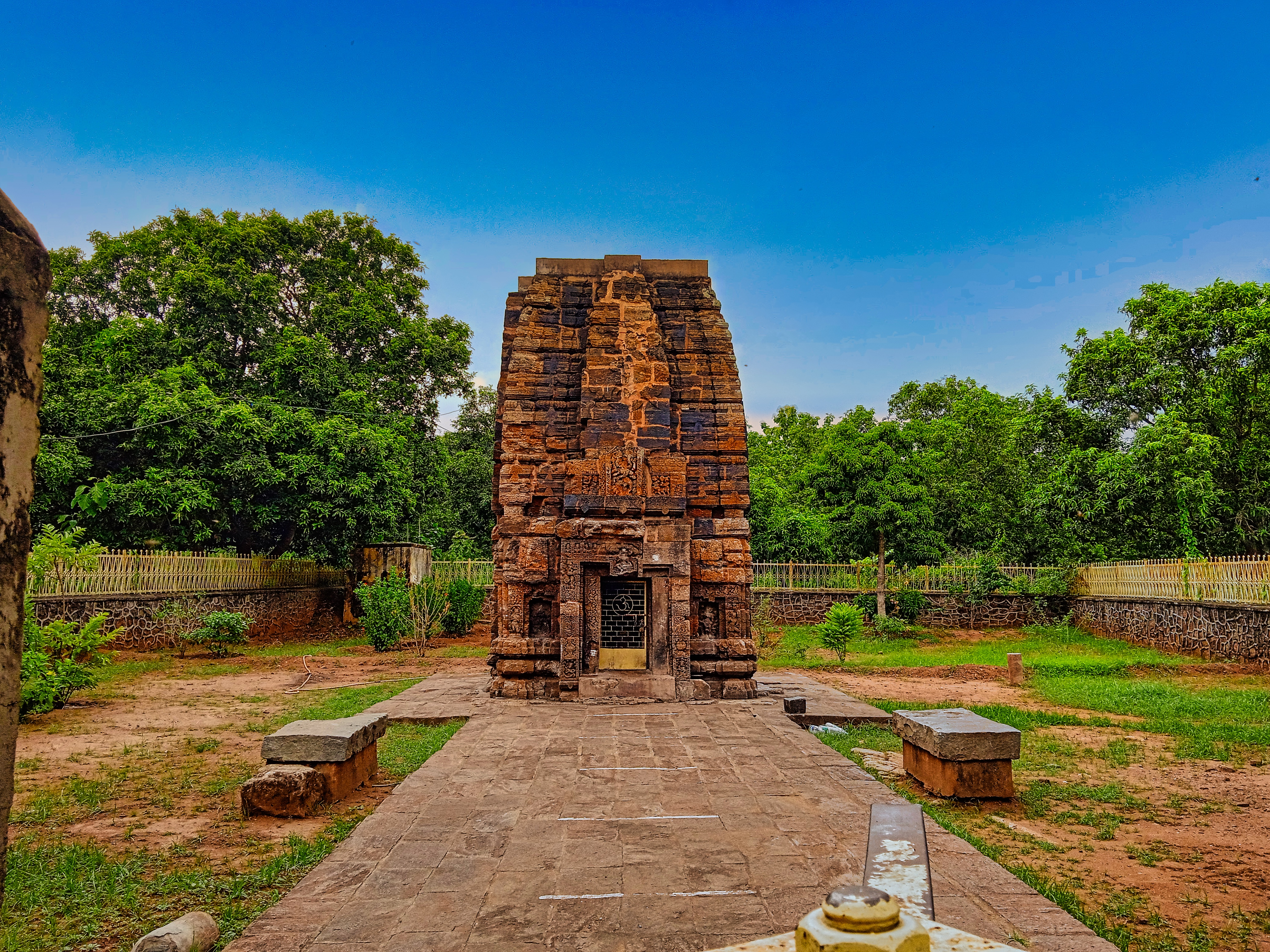
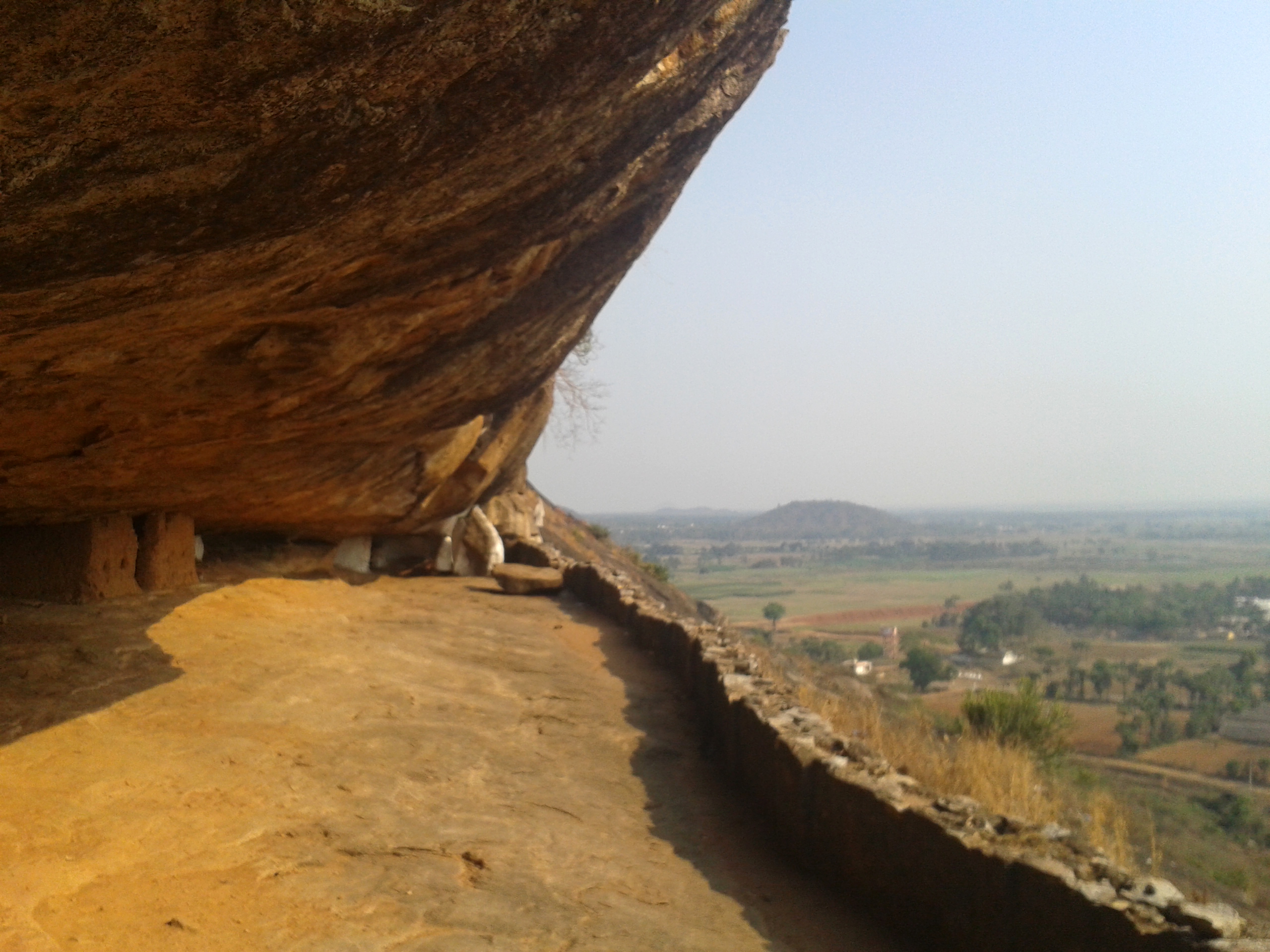
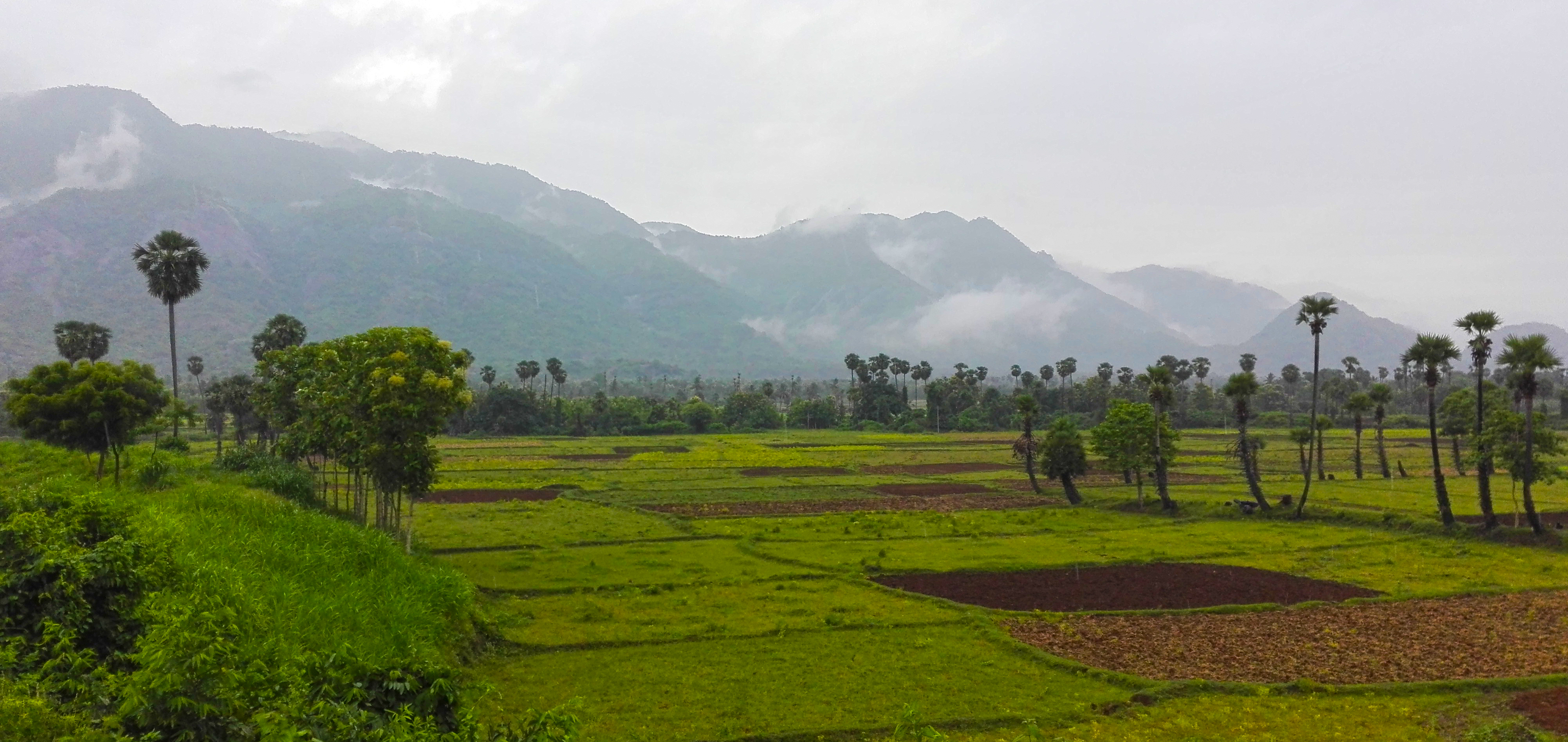
- Clockwise from top-left: Vizianagaram Fort gate, Jayathi Kalinga Temples, Bodhikonda Jain caves at Ramateertham, Eastern Ghats near Sontivanipalem village, Dibbeshwara Temple
- Interactive map of Vizianagaram district
- Country: India
- State: Andhra Pradesh
- Region: Uttara Andhra
- Headquarters: Vizianagaram
- Mandals: 28

Government
  - District collector: S Ram Sundar Reddy I.A.S
  - Lok Sabha constituencies: Vizianagaram, Vishakapatnam
  - Assembly constituencies: 07

Area
  - Total: 4,122 km^{2} (1,592 sq mi)

Population (2011)
  - Total: 1,930,811
  - Density: 468.4/km^{2} (1,213/sq mi)
  - Urban: 429,764

Demographics
  - Literacy: 59.49%
  - Sex ratio: 1016
- Time zone: UTC+5:30 (IST)
- Postal Index Number: 535XXX
- Vehicle registration: AP-35 (former); AP–39 (from 30 January 2019)
- Major highways: NH-16, NH- 26, NH-516E
- District LGD code: 521
- District abbreviation: VNG
- Coordinates: 18°12′N 83°24′E
- GDP (2022-23): ₹33,079 crore (equivalent to ₹360 billion or US$3.9 billion in 2026)
- Website: vizianagaram.ap.gov.in

Vizianagaram district (Telugu: [ʋidʒɐjɐnɐɡɐrɐw̃]) is a district in the Uttara Andhra region of the Indian state of Andhra Pradesh with its headquarters located at Vizianagaram. The district was once the part of ancient Kalinga. Saripilli Dibbilingeswara temple, Jayathi Mallikarjuna Temple are the finest examples of ancient Eastern Ganga Dynasty built monuments in the district. The district is bounded on the east by the district of Srikakulam, north by Parvathipuram Manyam south by Visakhapatnam, Anakapalli, south-east by the Bay of Bengal, and west by Alluri Sitharama Raju district.

== Etymology ==
The district is named after the princely state of Vizianagaram (Vijaya means victory and Nagaram means city in Telugu). In 2011, it was the least populous district in Andhra Pradesh.

== History ==
The district was formed on 1 June 1979, (Note: as per G.O.Ms.No.700/Revenue (U) Department, dated 15 May 1979) with some parts carved from the neighbouring districts of Srikakulam and Visakhapatnam. The taluks of Vizianagaram, Gajapathinagaram, Srungavarapukota and a portion of Bheemunipatnam Taluk were transferred from the Visakhapatnam District. The Salur, Bobbili, Parvathipuram and Cheepurupalli taluks from Srikakulam district were transferred to the new district.

=== Historical demographics ===
Historical population
Year	Pop.	±% p.a.
1901	929,913	—
1911	976,938	+0.49%
1921	987,532	+0.11%
1931	1,085,952	+0.95%
1941	1,198,241	+0.99%
1951	1,306,389	+0.87%
1961	1,411,055	+0.77%
1971	1,589,558	+1.20%
1981	1,804,196	+1.27%
1991	2,110,943	+1.58%
2001	2,249,254	+0.64%
2011	2,344,474	+0.42%

According to the 2011 census, Vizianagaram district has a population of 2,344,474. This gives it a ranking of 193rd in India (out of a total of 640). The district has a population density of 358 inhabitants per square kilometre (930/sq mi). Its population growth rate over the decade 2001–2011 was 4.16%. Vizianagaram has a sex ratio of 1016 females for every 1000 males, and a literacy rate of 59.49%.

== Geography ==
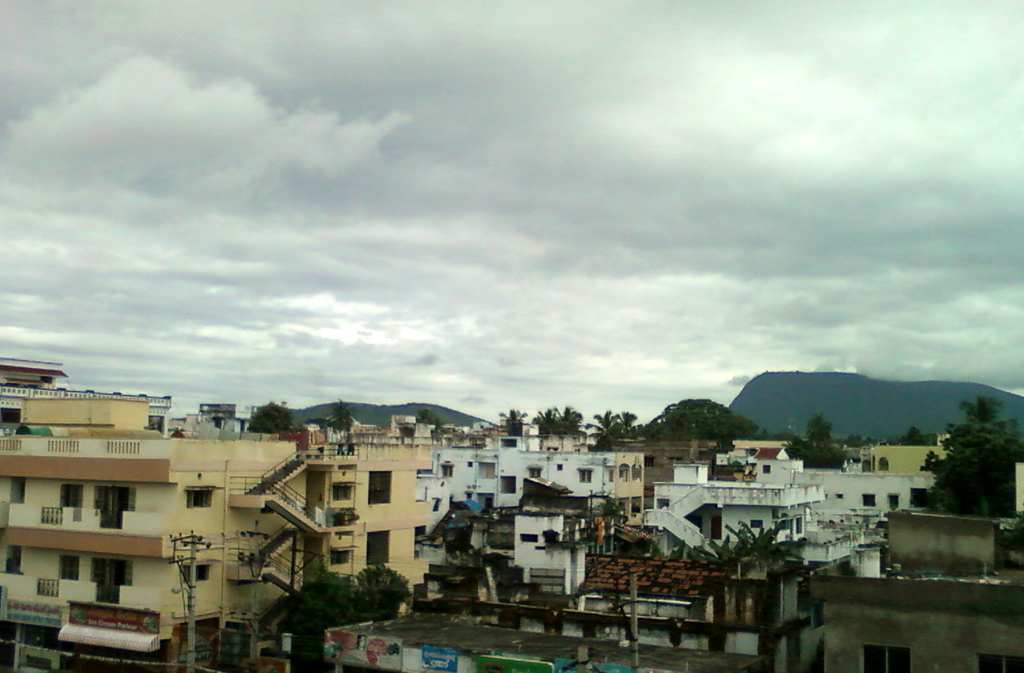
View of Vizianagaram town

It is situated within the geographical co-ordinates of 17- 15’ and 19 – 15’ of the northern latitudes and 83 – 00’ and 83 – 45’ of the eastern longitudes. Vizianagaram district occupies an area of 4,122 square kilometres (1,592 sq mi).

The principal rivers flowing in the district are River Nagavali, Suvarnamukhi, Vegavathi, River Champavathi, River Gosthani and Kandivalasa. There are no major irrigation projects in the district. The Denkada Anicut, Thatipudi Reservoir, Andra Reservoir Project, Vegavathi Anicut, Surapadu Anicut, Seethanagaram Anicut, Peda Ankalam Anicut, Vottigedda Reservoir Project, Paradi Anikut, Thotapalli Regulator and Vengala Raya Sagaram Project are the medium irrigation projects. The total irrigated area under these projects and the other minor projects are about 285,077 acres (1,154 km^{2}). Jhanjavati Project

== Climate ==
The climate of Vizianagaram district is characterised by high humidity nearly all-round the year with oppressive summer and good seasonal rainfall. The maximum temperature recorded during 2004 was 39.6°C during May and the minimum temperature is 17.1°C during December.

The normal rainfall of the district for the year is 1,131.0 mm as against the actual rainfall of 740.6 mm received during 2002–03. The district gets the benefit of both the South-West and North-East monsoon.

The average maximum and minimum temperatures and average rainfall recorded in 2004 at Agricultural Research Station, Vizianagaram are given below:

Climate data for Vizianagaram
Month	Jan	Feb	Mar	Apr	May	Jun	Jul	Aug	Sep	Oct	Nov	Dec	Year
Mean daily maximum °C (°F)	38.7 (101.7)	31.3 (88.3)	36.2 (97.2)	37.2 (99.0)	39.0 (102.2)	35.1 (95.2)	32.9 (91.2)	32.8 (91.0)	33.3 (91.9)	31.9 (89.4)	30.2 (86.4)	29.8 (85.6)	34.0 (93.3)
Mean daily minimum °C (°F)	18.2 (64.8)	19.1 (66.4)	23.2 (73.8)	26.1 (79.0)	27.0 (80.6)	26.8 (80.2)	25.7 (78.3)	26.3 (79.3)	25.7 (78.3)	22.8 (73.0)	19.5 (67.1)	17.1 (62.8)	23.1 (73.6)
Average precipitation mm (inches)	13.5 (0.53)	1.2 (0.05)	14.0 (0.55)	27.1 (1.07)	54.8 (2.16)	183.2 (7.21)	256.1 (10.08)	105.2 (4.14)	92.5 (3.64)	141.8 (5.58)	30.2 (1.19)	0.0 (0.0)	919.6 (36.2)

== Demographics ==
Religions in Vizianagaram district (2011)
Religion	Percent
Hindus	98.26%
Muslims	0.76%
Christians	0.55%
Other or not stated	0.43%
Distribution of religions

After bifurcation, the district had a population of 19,30,811, of which 429,764 (22.26%) lived in urban areas. Vizianagaram district had a sex ratio of 1010 females per 1000 males and a literacy rate of 53.21%. Scheduled Castes and Scheduled Tribes made up 2,07,333 (10.74%) and 46,884 (2.43%) of the population respectively. Telugu was the predominant language, spoken by 98.76% of the population.

Languages in Vizianagaram district (2011)
Language	Percent
Telugu	98.76%
Other or not stated	1.24%
Distribution of languages

=== Household indicators ===
In 2007–2008, the International Institute for Population Sciences interviewed 1232 households in 41 villages across the district. They found that 78.7% had access to electricity, 84.1% had drinking water, 18.5% toilet facilities, and 33.9% lived in a pucca (permanent) home. 28.6% of girls wed before the legal age of 18 and 87.3% of interviewees carried a BPL card.

== Economy ==
In 2006, the Indian government named Vizianagaram one of the country's 250 most backward districts (out of a total of 640). It is one of the thirteen districts in Andhra Pradesh currently receiving funds from the Backward Regions Grant Fund Programme (BRGF).

The Gross District Domestic Product (GDDP) of the district is ₹18,382 crore (US$2.0 billion) and it contributes 3.5% to the Gross State Domestic Product (GSDP). For the FY 2013–14, the per capita income at current prices was ₹61,157 (US$650). The primary, secondary and tertiary sectors of the district contribute ₹4,961 crore (US$530 million), ₹3,148 crore (US$340 million) and ₹10,272 crore (US$1.1 billion) respectively. The major products contributing to the GVA of the district from agriculture and allied services are sugarcane, paddy, mango, tomato, milk, meat and fisheries. The GVA to the industrial and service sector is contributed from construction, manufacturing, minor minerals, education and ownership of dwellings.

=== Industry ===
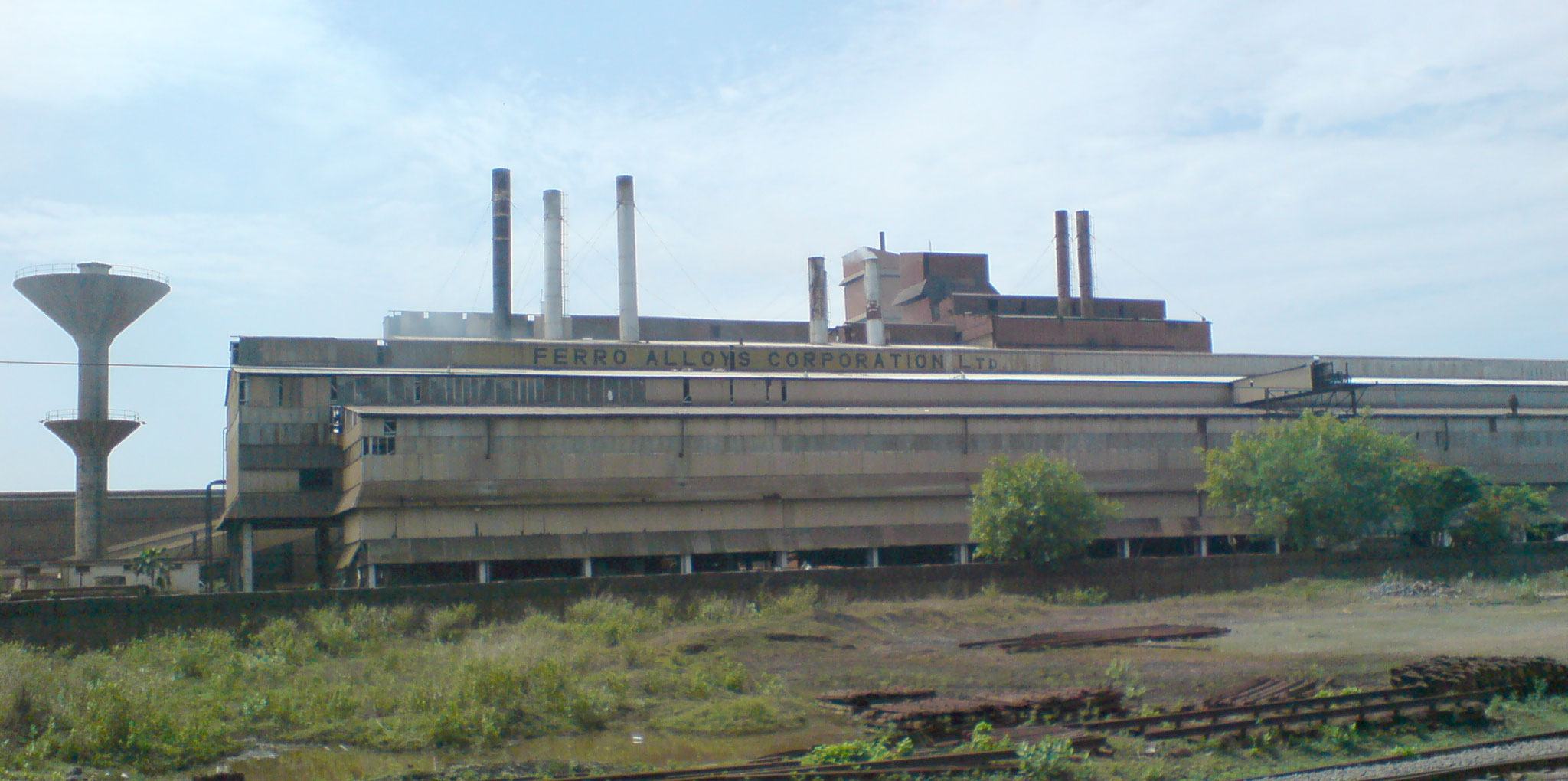
Facor unit in Vizianagaram district

Certain famous industries include

- The Ferro Alloys Corporation Limited at Sriramnagar, Garividi
- Jindal Stainless Limited (Ferro Alloys Division), Kothavalasa
- Andhra Ferro Alloys Limited at Kothavalasa and Garbham

== Politics ==
There are seven assembly and two parliamentary constituencies in the district.

=== Parliament segments ===
Vizianagaram (Lok Sabha constituency), Visakhapatnam (Lok Sabha constituency)

=== Assembly segments ===
The six Assembly segments of Vizianagaram Lok Sabha and one Assembly segment in Visakhapatnam Lok Sabha constituency are:

Constituency number	Name	Reserved for (SC/ST/none)	Parliament
9	Rajam	SC	Vizianagaram
14	Bobbili	None	Vizianagaram
15	Cheepurupalli	None	Vizianagaram
16	Gajapathinagaram	None	Vizianagaram
17	Nellimarla	None	Vizianagaram
18	Vizianagaram	None	Vizianagaram
19	Srungavarapukota	None	Visakhapatnam

== Administrative divisions ==
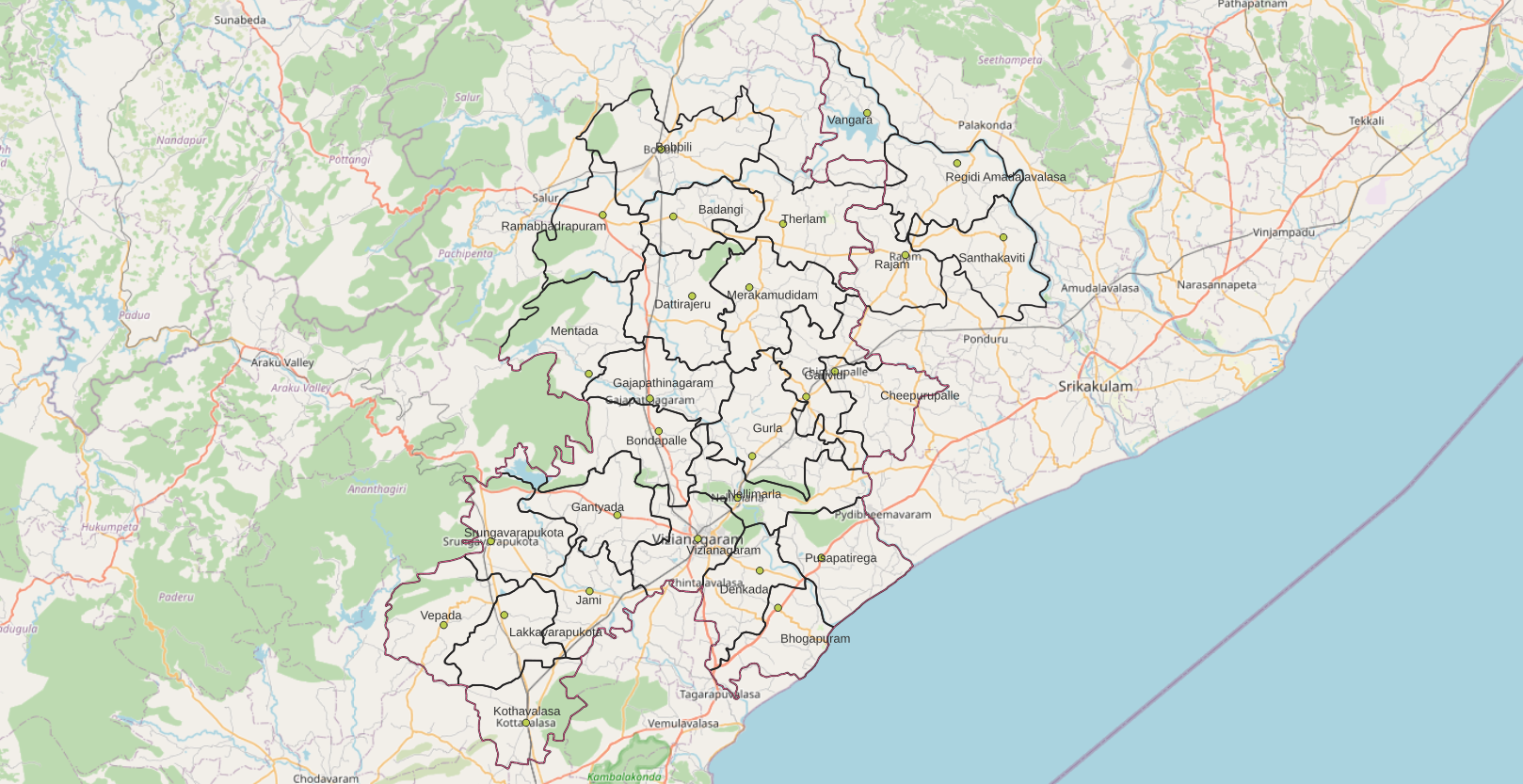
Satellite view of Vizianagaram district

The district is divided into three revenue divisions: Bobbili, Cheepurupalli and Vizianagaram, which are further subdivided into a total of 28 mandals, each headed by a sub-collector.

=== Mandals ===
The list of 28 mandals in Vizianagaram district.

1. Bobbili revenue division
  1. Bobbili
  2. Ramabhadrapuram
  3. Badangi
  4. Therlam
  5. Gajapathinagaram
  6. Dattirajeru
  7. Mentada
2. Cheepurupalli revenue division
  1. Cheepurupalli
  2. Garividi
  3. Gurla
  4. Merakamudidam
  5. Vangara
  6. Regidi Amadalavalasa
  7. Santhakavati mandal
  8. Rajam
3. Vizianagaram revenue division
  1. Vizianagaram Urban
  2. Gantyada
  3. Poosapatirega
  4. Denkada
  5. Bhogapuram
  6. Srungavarapukota
  7. Jami
  8. Vepada
  9. Lakkavarapukota
  10. Kothavalasa
  11. Bondapalli
  12. Nellimarla
  13. Vizianagaram Rural

=== Cities and towns ===
S.no.	City/town	Civic status of town	No. of wards	Municipality Formation Year	2011 Census Population
1	Vizianagarm	Municipal Corporation	50	1888	2,28,720
2	Bobbili	Municipality Grade - 2	31	1956	56,819
3	Rajam	Nagar Panchayat	20	2005	42,197
4	Nellimarla	Nagar Panchayat	20	2013	26,259

== Culture ==
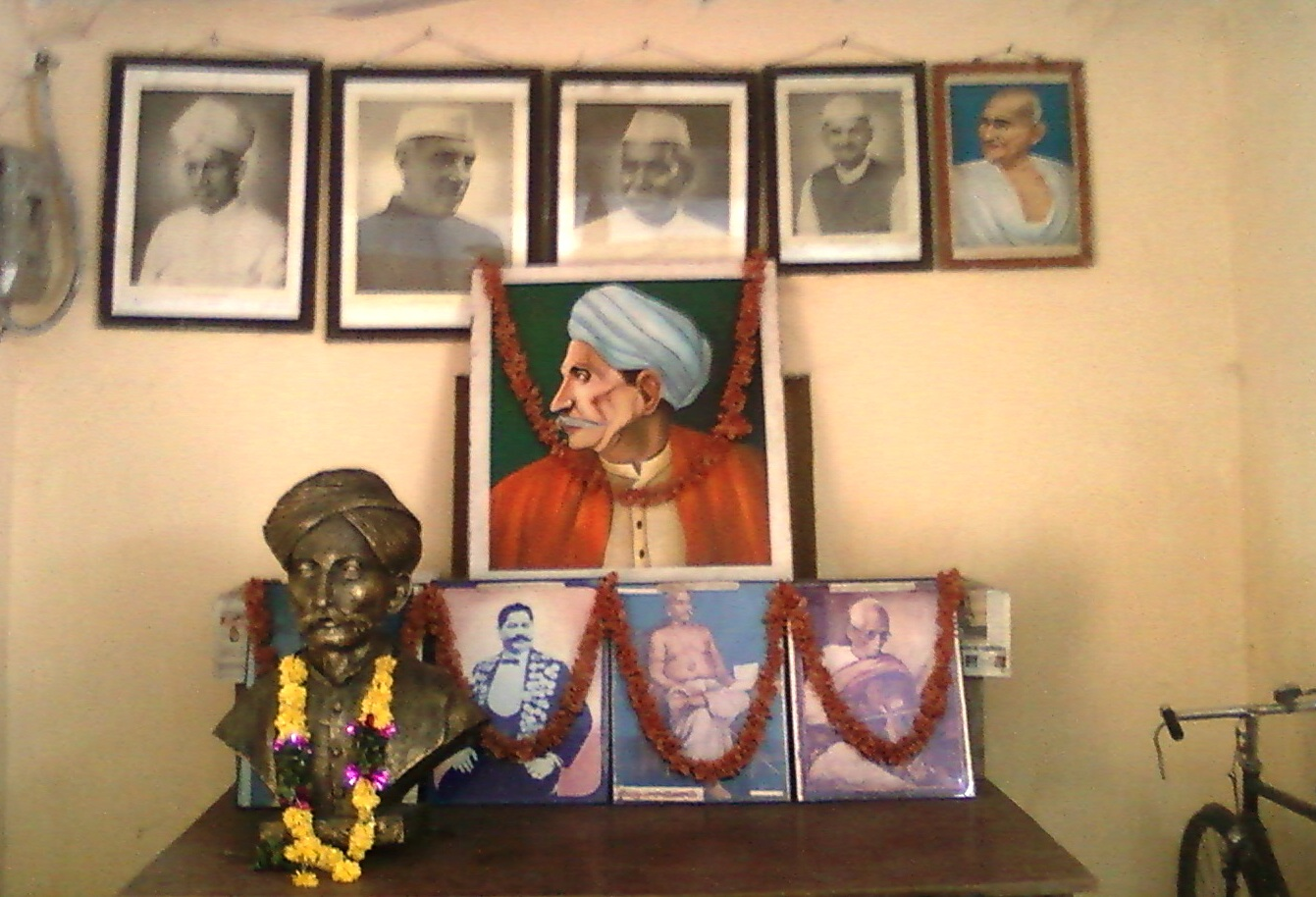
Portrait of Gurazada Apparao at Vizianagaram

The religion of the majority is Hinduism. The major festivals are Sankranthi, Ugadi and Rama Navami, Maha Shivaratri, Deepavali, Vinayaka Chavithi, Dasara and Vijayadasami. The nine-day festival celebrations during Rama Navami and Ganesh Chaturthi are well-known in many towns and associated with many cultural events including Stage Dramas, Harikathas, Burra kathas etc. Festivals of Gramadevatha are held annually at Vizianagaram, Bobbili, Salur, Parvathipuram and Sambara. The most popular amongst them is Pydithalli Ammavari Jatra, celebrated at Vizianagaram on the next Tuesday of Vijayadasami day. And also Polamma Jatara, at Sambara in Sambara Village of Makkuva Mandal is a Very much state known festival being celebrated in every third week of January. This is a very important festival for north andhra people.

Saripilli Dibbilingeswara temple, Jayathi Mallikarjuna Temple are the finest examples of ancient Eastern Ganga Dynasty built monuments in the district. There are eleven temples under the management of Endowments Department.

The cuisine is strikingly South Indian style with rice as the staple food accompanied by dals, rasam or sambar, vegetable curries, pickles and curd.

== Transport ==
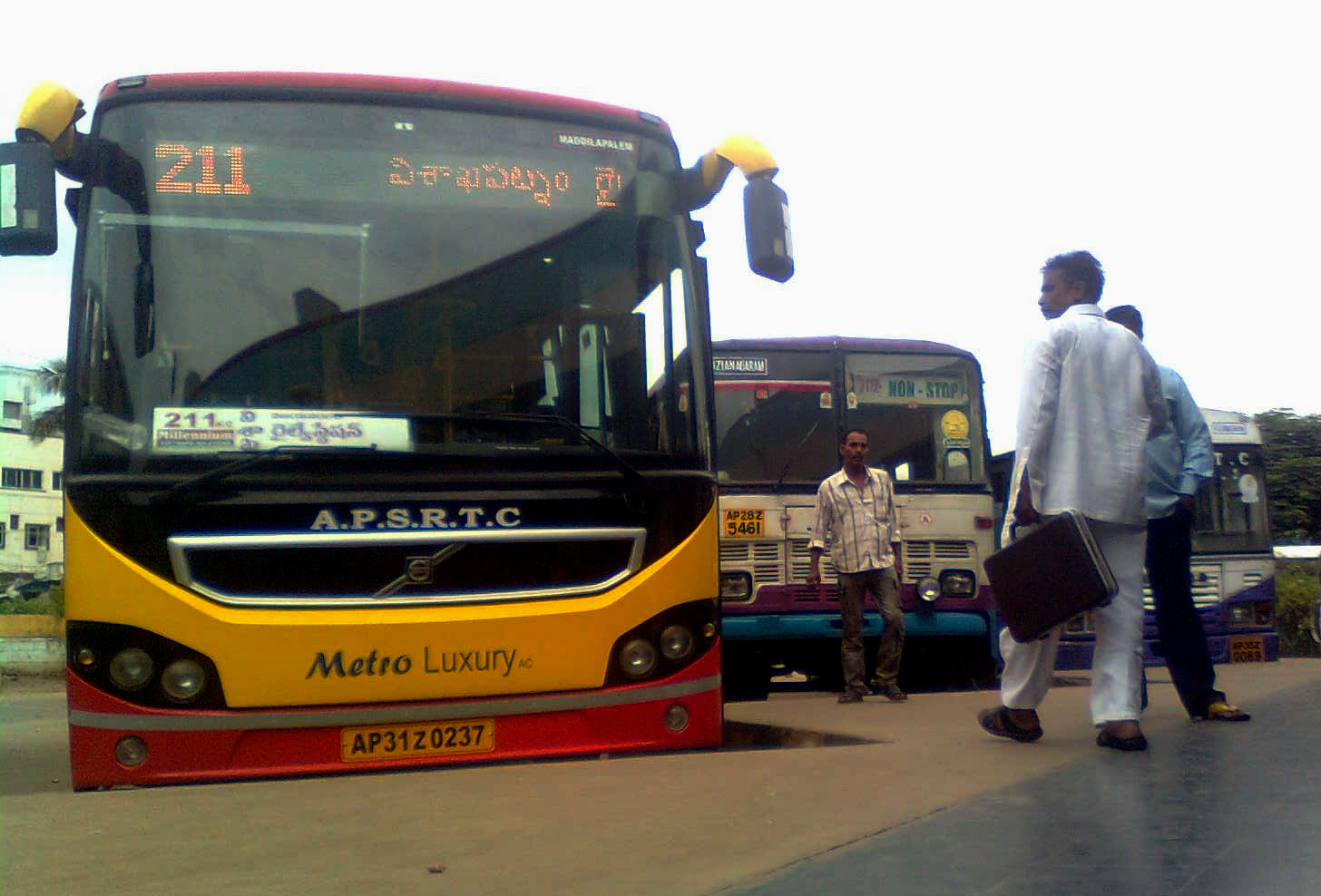
APSRTC buses at Vizianagaram Bus Complex

The total road length of state highways in the district is 777 km (483 mi). Andhra Pradesh State Road Transport Corporation runs bus services to all the major cities and towns of the state from the district. Major railway stations in the district include Vizianagaram, Cheepurupalli, Bobbili. Railway network in the entire district comes under Waltair (Vishakapatnam) division of the South Coast Railway zone. Vizianagaram and Kothavalasa are the main railway junctions. There are 28 railway stations in the district.

National Highways 5 and 43 passes through the district and covers a distance of 200 kilometres. National Highway 43 (India) runs almost entirely in Vizianagaram district for a distance of 83 kilometres and passes through Odisha to Raipur in Chhattisgarh (total length of 551 kilometres). It passes through Vizianagaram, Gajapathinagaram, Ramabhadrapuram and Salur towns. National Highway 5 passes through coastal mandals of Bhogapuram and Pusapatirega. State Highways covers a distance of 122 kilometres, major district roads 852 kilometres and rural roads 781 kilometres.

== Tourism ==
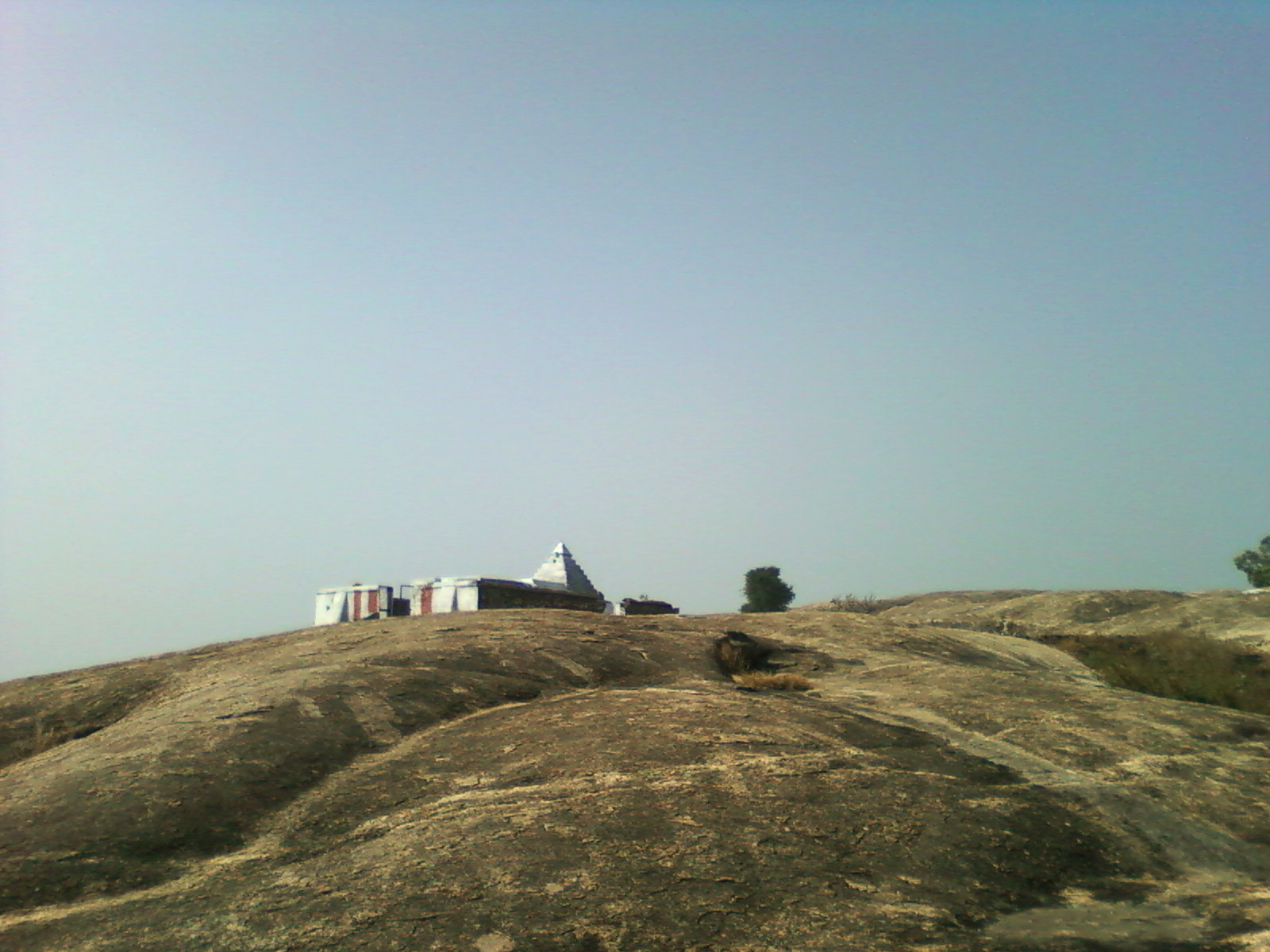
1000-year-old Sri Rama temple on top of Bodhikonda, Ramatheertham

Ramatheertham is a village panchayat in Nellimarla mandal of Vizianagaram district. It is located 12 km from Vizianagaram city.

== Education ==
The primary and secondary school education is imparted by government, aided and private schools, under the School Education Department of the state. As per the school information report for the academic year 2015–16, there are a total of 3,875 schools. They include 85 government, 2,060 mandal and zilla parishads, 1 residential, 618 private, 16 model, 33 Kasturba Gandhi Balika Vidyalaya (KGBV), 112 municipal and 423 other types of schools. The total number of students enrolled in primary, upper primary and high schools of the district are 307,298.

Vizianagaram district has been comparatively backward in the field of education. The literacy rate is 51.82% as against the average of 61.55% for the entire Andhra Pradesh State.

There are 38 branch libraries in the district managed by Zilla Granthalaya Samstha. They are located 1–two in each mandal. There are about 41 book depot centres in the district.

- University College of Engineering, JNTU kakinada, Vizianagaram
- Andhra University Vizianagaram campus
- Avanthi Institute of Engineering and Technology, Cherukupalli, Bhogapuram
- Kodi Rama Murthy College of Physical Education, Bobbili
- Maharajah's Government College of Music and Dance
- Maharajah's Government Sanskrit College, Vizianagaram
- Maharaj Vijayaram Gajapath Raj College of Engineering, Vizianagaram
- St. Theressa Institute of Engineering and Technology, Garividi (Cheepurupalli)
- Thandra Paparaya Institute of Science and Technology, Bobbili
- Maharajah's College
- Sainik School Korukondda

== Notable people ==
- Kodi Rammurthy Naidu, Indian bodybuilder
- P. Susheela, singer
- Maharajkumar of Vizianagram, Indian cricketer, cricket administrator and politician
- Pusapati Vijayarama Gajapati Raju, Indian parliamentarian and philanthropist
- Gedela Srinubabu, Politician and Businessman
- Praveen Sattaru, film director
- Vidyasagar, music director
- Gollapudi Maruti Rao, Writer and Actor
- Gurajada Appa Rao, Social reformer

== See also ==
- List of villages in Vizianagaram district
