= List of members of the Andhra Pradesh Legislative Council =

This is a list of current and past members of the Andhra Pradesh Legislative Council. The state elects' members for a term of six years. 20 members are indirectly elected by the state legislators. 20 members are elected from Local Authorities Constituency, 5 from Graduates Constituency and 5 from Teachers Constituency. The Governor of Andhra Pradesh nominates up to 8 members from eminent people from various fields.

== Members of Andhra Pradesh Legislative Council ==
Alphabetical list by last name

The list is incomplete.

- * represents current members
- MLA - Members of Legislative Assembly (of Andhra Pradesh)
- LA - Local Authorities
- GR - Graduates
- TA - Teachers
- NOM - Nominated by Governor

Member	Party	Constituency	Term start	Term end	Term(s)	Notes
Somu Veerraju	BJP	MLA	30-Mar-2025	29-Mar-2031		
Kumba Ravibabu	YSRCP	NOM	10-Aug-2023	09-Aug-2029		
Karri Padmasree	YSRCP	NOM	10-Aug-2023	09-Aug-2029		
Cipai Subramanyam	YSRCP	Chitoor LA	02-May-2023	01-May-2029		
Kudupudi Suryanarayana Rao	YSRCP	East Godavari LA	02-May-2023	01-May-2029		
A. Madhusudhan	YSRCP	Kurnool LA	02-May-2023	01-May-2029		
Narthu Ramarao	YSRCP	Srikakulam LA	02-May-2023	01-May-2029		
Meriga Muralidhar	YSRCP	Nellore LA	02-May-2023	01-May-2029		
Kavuru Srinivasa Rao	YSRCP	West Godavari LA	02-May-2023	01-May-2029		
Vanka Raveendranath	YSRCP	West Godavari LA	02-May-2023	01-May-2029		
Sanipalli Mangamma	YSRCP	Anantpur LA	30-Mar-2023	29-Mar-2029		
P. Rama Subba Reddy	YSRCP	Kadapa LA	30-Mar-2023	29-Mar-2029		
V. Chiranjeevi Rao	TDP	Srikakulam-Vizag-Vizianagaram GR	30-Mar-2023	29-Mar-2029		
Kancharla Srikanth	TDP	Prakasam-Nellore-Chittoor GR	30-Mar-2023	29-Mar-2029		
B. Ramgopal Reddy	TDP	Kadapa-Anantapur-Kurnool GR	30-Mar-2023	29-Mar-2029		
P. Chandrasekhar Reddy	Ind	Prakasam-Nellore-Chittoor TR	30-Mar-2023	29-Mar-2029		
M. V. Ramachandra Reddy	Ind	Kadapa-Kurnool-Anantapur TR	30-Mar-2023	29-Mar-2029		
P. V. V. Suryanarayana Raju	YSRCP	MLA	30-Mar-2023	29-Mar-2029		
Pothula Suneetha	YSRCP	MLA	30-Mar-2023	29-Mar-2029		
Bommi Israel	YSRCP	MLA	30-Mar-2023	29-Mar-2029		
Jayamangalam Venkata Ramana	YSRCP	MLA	30-Mar-2023	29-Mar-2029		
Chandragiri Yesuratnam	YSRCP	MLA	30-Mar-2023	29-Mar-2029		
Marri Rajashekar	YSRCP	MLA	30-Mar-2023	29-Mar-2029		
Panchumarthi Anuradha	TDP	MLA	30-Mar-2023	29-Mar-2029		
Mohammed Ruhulla	YSRCP	MLA	24-Mar-2022	29-Mar-2027		bye - death of Mohammed Karimunnisa
R. V. Ramesh Yadav	YSRCP	NOM	16-Jun-2021	15-Jun-2027		
Koyye Moshenu Raju	YSRCP	NOM	16-Jun-2021	15-Jun-2027		
Lella Appi Reddy	YSRCP	NOM	16-Jun-2021	15-Jun-2027		
Thota Trimurthulu	YSRCP	NOM	16-Jun-2021	15-Jun-2027		
Yellareddygari Sivaramireddy	YSRCP	Anantpur LA	10-Dec-2021	09-Dec-2027		
K. R. J. Bharath	YSRCP	Chitoor LA	10-Dec-2021	09-Dec-2027		
Ananta Satya Udaya Bhaskar	YSRCP	East Godavari LA	10-Dec-2021	09-Dec-2027		
Murugudu Hanumantha Rao	YSRCP	Guntur LA	10-Dec-2021	09-Dec-2027		
Ummareddy Venkateswarlu	YSRCP	Guntur LA	10-Dec-2021	09-Dec-2027		
Monditoka Arunkumar	YSRCP	Krishna LA	10-Dec-2021	09-Dec-2027		
Talasila Raghuram	YSRCP	Krishna LA	10-Dec-2021	09-Dec-2027		
Tumati Madhava Rao	YSRCP	Prakasam LA	10-Dec-2021	09-Dec-2027		
Varudhu Kalyani	YSRCP	Visakhapatnam LA	10-Dec-2021	09-Dec-2027		
Vamsi Krishna Srinivasa	YSRCP	Visakhapatnam LA	10-Dec-2021	12-Mar-2024		disqualified
Indukuri Raghu Raju	YSRCP	Vizianagaram LA	10-Dec-2021	03-Jun-2024		disqualified
D. C. Govinda Reddy	YSRCP	MLA	29-Nov-2021	28-Nov-2027		
Palavalasa Vikranth	YSRCP	MLA	29-Nov-2021	28-Nov-2027		
Isacc Basha	YSRCP	MLA	29-Nov-2021	28-Nov-2027		
Shaik Sabjee	Ind	East Godavari-West Godavari TR	30-Mar-2021	15-Dec-2023		death
Borra Gopi Murthy	Ind	East Godavari-West Godavari TR	09-Dec-2024	29-Mar-2027		
Tamatam Kalpalatha	Ind	Krishna-Guntur TR	30-Mar-2021	29-Mar-2027		
Balli Kalyanachakravarthy	YSRCP	MLA	30-Mar-2021	29-Mar-2027		
Duvvada Srinivas	YSRCP	MLA	30-Mar-2021	29-Mar-2027		
C. Ramachandraiah	YSRCP	MLA	30-Mar-2021	12-Mar-2024		disqualified
Shaikh Mohammed Iqbal	YSRCP	MLA	30-Mar-2021	05-Mar-2024		resigned
Mohammed Karimunnisa	YSRCP	MLA	30-Mar-2021	19-Nov-2021		death
Challa Bhageerath Reddy	YSRCP	MLA	15-Mar-2021	02-Nov-2022		bye - death of Challa Ramakrishna Reddy death
Pothula Suneetha	YSRCP	MLA	28-Jan-2021	29-Mar-2023		bye - resignation by herself
P. V. V. Suryanarayana Raju	YSRCP	MLA	24-Aug-2020	29-Mar-2023		bye - resignation of Mopidevi Venkataramana
Pandula Ravindra Babu	YSRCP	NOM	28-Jul-2020	27-Jul-2026		
Zakia Khanam	BJP	NOM	28-Jul-2020	27-Jul-2026		
Dokka Manikya Vara Prasad	YSRCP	MLA	06-Jul-2020	29-Mar-2023		bye - resignation by himself
Mopidevi Venkataramana	YSRCP	MLA	19-Aug-2019	01-Jul-2020		bye - resignation of Alla Nani elected to Rajya Sabha
Challa Ramakrishna Reddy	YSRCP	MLA	19-Aug-2019	01-Jan-2021		bye - resignation of Karanam Balaram Krishna Murthy death
Shaikh Mohammed Iqbal	YSRCP	MLA	19-Aug-2019	29-Mar-2021		bye - resignation of Kolagatla Veerabhadra Swamy
I. Venkateswara Rao	PDF	East Godavari-West Godavari GR	30-Mar-2019	29-Mar-2025		
K. S. Lakshmana Rao	PDF	Krishna-Guntur GR	30-Mar-2019	29-Mar-2025		
P. Raghu Varma	Ind	Vizianagaram-Vizag-Srikakulam TR	30-Mar-2019	29-Mar-2025		
Yanamala Rama Krishnudu	TDP	MLA	30-Mar-2019	29-Mar-2025		
Ashok Babu	TDP	MLA	30-Mar-2019	29-Mar-2025		
B. Tirumala Naidu	TDP	MLA	30-Mar-2019	29-Mar-2025		
Duvvarapu Rama Rao	TDP	MLA	30-Mar-2019	29-Mar-2025		
Janga Krishna Murthy	YSRCP	MLA	30-Mar-2019	17-May-2024		disqualified
Buddha Naga Jagadeeswara Rao	TDP	Visakhapatnam LA	09-Mar-2019	11-Aug-2021		bye - death of M. V. V. S. Murthi
Gali Saraswathamma	TDP	Chitoor LA	21-May-2018	11-Aug-2021		bye - death of Gali Muddu Krishnama Naidu
K. E. Prabhakar	TDP	Kurnool LA	30-Dec-2017	01-May-2023		bye - resignation of Silpa Chakrapani Reddy
N. M. D. Farooq	TDP	NOM	26-Jul-2017	25-Jul-2023		
Ramasubba Reddy	TDP	NOM	26-Jul-2017	13-Feb-2019		resigned
B. N. Rajasimhulu	TDP	Chitoor LA	02-May-2017	01-May-2023		
Chikkala Ramachandra Rao	TDP	East Godavari LA	02-May-2017	01-May-2023		
Silpa Chakrapani Reddy	TDP	Kurnool LA	02-May-2017	14-Aug-2017		resigned
Satrucharla Vijaya Rama Raju	TDP	Srikakulam LA	02-May-2017	01-May-2023		
Thappeta Yerram Reddy	YSRCP	tirupati LA	02-May-2017	01-May-2023		
Angara Ramamohan	TDP	West Godavari LA	02-May-2017	01-May-2023		
Mantena Satyanarayana Raju	TDP	West Godavari LA	02-May-2017	01-May-2023		
Gunapati Deepak Reddy	TDP	Anantpur LA	30-Mar-2017	29-Mar-2023		
B.Tech Ravi	TDP	Kadapa LA	30-Mar-2017	29-Mar-2023		
P. V. N. Madhav	BJP	Srikakulam-Vizag-Vizianagaram GR	30-Mar-2017	29-Mar-2023		
Yandapalli Srinivasulu Reddy	PDF	Prakasam-Nellore-Chittoor GR	30-Mar-2017	29-Mar-2023		
Vennapoosa Gopal Reddy	YSRCP	Kadapa-Anantapur-Kurnool GR	30-Mar-2017	29-Mar-2023		
Vitapu Balasubrahmanyam	PDF	Prakasam-Nellore-Chittoor TR	30-Mar-2017	29-Mar-2023		
Katti Narasimha Reddy	Ind	Kadapa-Kurnool-Anantapur TR	30-Mar-2017	29-Mar-2023		
Nara Lokesh	TDP	MLA	30-Mar-2017	29-Mar-2023		
Batchula Arjunudu	TDP	MLA	30-Mar-2017	02-Mar-2023		death
Karanam Balaram Krishna Murthy	TDP	MLA	30-Mar-2017	06-Jun-2019		elected to Chirala Assembly
Dokka Manikya Vara Prasad	TDP	MLA	30-Mar-2017	09-Mar-2020		joined YSRCP
Pothula Suneetha	TDP	MLA	30-Mar-2017	01-Nov-2020		joined YSRCP
Gangula Prabhakar Reddy	YSRCP	MLA	30-Mar-2017	29-Mar-2023		
Alla Nani	YSRCP	MLA	30-Mar-2017	06-Jun-2019		elected to Eluru Assembly
Payyavula Keshav	TDP	Anantpur LA	12-Aug-2015	04-Jun-2019		elected to Uravakonda Assembly
Gali Muddu Krishnama Naidu	TDP	Chitoor LA	12-Aug-2015	07-Feb-2018		death
Subramnayam Reddy	TDP	East Godavari LA	12-Aug-2015	11-Aug-2021		
Annam Satish Prabhakar	TDP	Guntur LA	12-Aug-2015	11-Aug-2021		
Ummareddy Venkateswarlu	YSRCP	Guntur LA	12-Aug-2015	11-Aug-2021		
Buddha Venkateswara Rao	TDP	Krishna LA	12-Aug-2015	11-Aug-2021		
Y. V. B. Rajendra Prasad	TDP	Krishna LA	12-Aug-2015	11-Aug-2021		
Magunta Srinivasula Reddy	TDP	Prakasam LA	12-Aug-2015	11-Aug-2021		
Pappala Chalapathirao	TDP	Visakhapatnam LA	12-Aug-2015	11-Aug-2021		
M. V. V. S. Murthi	TDP	Visakhapatnam LA	12-Aug-2015	03-Oct-2018		death
Dwarapureddi Jagadeesh Rao	TDP	Vizianagaram LA	12-Aug-2015	11-Aug-2021		
Silpa Chakrapani Reddy	TDP	Kurnool LA	03-Jul-2015	01-May-2017		bye - resignation of S. V. Mohan Reddy
Mohammed Ahmed Sharif	TDP	MLA	01-Jun-2015	31-May-2021		
Somu Veerraju	BJP	MLA	01-Jun-2015	31-May-2021		
D. C. Govinda Reddy	YSRCP	MLA	01-Jun-2015	31-May-2021		
K. Pratibha Bharati	TDP	MLA	01-Jun-2015	29-Mar-2017		bye - death of Paladugu Venkata Rao
Ramu Surya Rao	Ind	East Godavari-West Godavari TR	30-Mar-2015	29-Mar-2021		
A. S. Ramakrishna	Ind	Krishna-Guntur TR	30-Mar-2015	29-Mar-2021		
Gummadi Sandhya Rani	TDP	MLA	30-Mar-2015	29-Mar-2021		
Gundumala Thippe Swamy	TDP	MLA	30-Mar-2015	29-Mar-2021		
Veera Venkanna Chowdary	TDP	MLA	30-Mar-2015	29-Mar-2021		
Pilli Subhash Chandra Bose	YSRCP	MLA	30-Mar-2015	01-Jul-2020		elected to Rajya Sabha
Kolagatla Veerabhadra Swamy	YSRCP	MLA	30-Mar-2015	06-Jun-2019		elected to Vizianagaram Assembly
Ponguru Narayana	TDP	MLA	14-Aug-2014	29-Mar-2019		bye - resignation of Kolagatla Veerabhadra Swamy
Kalidindi Ravi Kiran Varma	Ind	East Godavari-West Godavari GR	30-Mar-2013	29-Mar-2019		
Boddu Nageswara Rao	Ind	Krishna-Guntur GR	30-Mar-2013	29-Mar-2019		
Gade Srinivasulu Naidu	Ind	Vizianagaram-Vizag-Srikakulam TR	30-Mar-2007	29-Mar-2019		
Swamy Goud	TRS	Medak-Nizamabad-Adilabad-Karimnagar GR	30-Mar-2013	29-Mar-2019		
Poola Ravinder	INC	Warangal-Khammam-Nalgonda TR	30-Mar-2013	29-Mar-2019		
Pathuri Sudhakar Reddy	TRS	Medak-Nizamabad-Adilabad-Karimnagar TR	30-Mar-2013	29-Mar-2019		
Ponguleti Sudhakar Reddy	INC	MLA	30-Mar-2013	29-Mar-2019		
Kolagatla Veerabhadra Swamy	INC	MLA	30-Mar-2013	21-May-2014		resigned
Mohammed Ali Shabbir	INC	MLA	30-Mar-2013	29-Mar-2019		
Lakshmi Siva Kumari Anguri	INC	MLA	30-Mar-2013	29-Mar-2019		
Thiruvaragarm Santhosh Kumar	INC	MLA	30-Mar-2013	29-Mar-2019		
Yanamala Rama Krishnudu	TDP	MLA	30-Mar-2013	29-Mar-2019		
Mohammed Saleem	TDP	MLA	30-Mar-2013	29-Mar-2019		
Pamidi Samanthakamani	TDP	MLA	30-Mar-2013	29-Mar-2019		
Mahmood Ali	TRS	MLA	30-Mar-2013	29-Mar-2019		
Adireddy Appa Rao	YSRCP	MLA	30-Mar-2013	29-Mar-2019		
B. Naresh Kumar Reddy	INC	Chitoor LA	02-May-2011	01-May-2017		
Boddu Bhaskara Ramarao	TDP	East Godavari LA	02-May-2011	01-May-2017		
S. V. Mohan Reddy	INC	Kurnool LA	02-May-2011	18-May-2012		resigned
Peerukatla Viswa Prasada Rao	INC	Srikakulam LA	02-May-2011	01-May-2017		
Vakati Narayana Reddy	INC	Nellore LA	02-May-2011	01-May-2017		
Angara Rammohan Rao	TDP	West Godavari LA	02-May-2011	01-May-2017		
Meka Seshu Babu	YSRCP	West Godavari LA	02-May-2011	01-May-2017		
Syed Aminul Hasan Jafri	AIMIM	Hyderabad LA	02-May-2011	01-May-2017		
Mettu Govinda Reddy	TDP	Anantpur LA	30-Mar-2011	29-Mar-2017		
Chadipiralla Narayana Reddy	YSRCP	Kadapa LA	30-Mar-2011	29-Mar-2017		
M. V. S. Sarma	Ind	Srikakulam-Vizag-Vizianagaram GR	30-Mar-2011	29-Mar-2017		
Yandapalli Srinivasulu Reddy	Ind	Prakasam-Nellore-Chittoor GR	30-Mar-2011	29-Mar-2017		
M. Geyanand	Ind	Kadapa-Anantapur-Kurnool GR	30-Mar-2011	29-Mar-2017		
Vitapu Balasubrahmanyam	Ind	Prakasam-Nellore-Chittoor TR	30-Mar-2011	29-Mar-2017		
Bachala Pullaiah	Ind	Kadapa-Kurnool-Anantapur TR	30-Mar-2011	29-Mar-2017		
Katepally Janardhan Reddy	Ind	Mahabubnagar-Hyderabad-Ranga Reddy TR	30-Mar-2011	29-Mar-2017		
Mohammad Jani	INC	MLA	30-Mar-2011	29-Mar-2017		
Changalrayudu	INC	MLA	30-Mar-2011	29-Mar-2017		
Sudhakar Babu	INC	MLA	30-Mar-2011	29-Mar-2017		
M Ranga Reddy	INC	MLA	30-Mar-2011	29-Mar-2017		
Paladugu Venkata Rao	INC	MLA	30-Mar-2011	19-Jan-2015		death
Gangadhar Goud	TDP	MLA	30-Mar-2011	29-Mar-2017		
Venkata Satish Reddy	TDP	MLA	30-Mar-2011	29-Mar-2017		
P. J. Chandrasekhara Rao	CPI	MLA	30-Mar-2011	29-Mar-2017		
C. Ramachandraiah	PRP	MLA	30-Mar-2011	29-Mar-2017		
Altaf Hyder Rizvi	AIMIM	MLA	30-Mar-2011	29-Mar-2017		
		Warangal LA	02-May-2009	01-May-2015		
Pothula Rama Rao	INC	Prakasam LA	02-May-2009	01-May-2015		
D. V. Suryanarayana Raju	INC	Visakhapatnam LA	02-May-2009	01-May-2015		
		Nalgonda LA	02-May-2009	01-May-2015		
		Medak LA	02-May-2009	01-May-2015		
		Nizamabad LA	02-May-2009	01-May-2015		
		Khammam LA	02-May-2009	01-May-2015		
		Karimnagar LA	02-May-2009	01-May-2015		
		Mahbubnagar LA	02-May-2009	01-May-2015		
Ilapuram Venkaiah	INC	Krishna LA	30-Mar-2009	29-Mar-2015		
K .Jayachandra Naidu	INC	Chitoor LA	02-May-2007	01-May-2013		
Nimmakayala Chinarajappa	TDP	East Godavari LA	02-May-2007	01-May-2013		
Rayapati Srinivas Rao	INC	Guntur LA	02-May-2007	01-May-2013		
		Guntur LA	02-May-2007	01-May-2013		
Dadi Veerabhadra Rao	TDP	Visakhapatnam LA	02-May-2007	01-May-2013		
Vasireddy Varada Rama Rao		Vizianagaram LA	02-May-2007	01-May-2013		
Y. V. B. Rajendra Prasad	TDP	Krishna LA	30-Mar-2007	29-Mar-2013		
		Anantpur LA	30-Mar-2007	29-Mar-2013		
