= 2023 Andhra Pradesh Legislative Council election =

Elections for the Upper House of Andhra Pradesh Legislature

- 2023
- 21 seats in the Andhra Pradesh Legislative Council
Party	Leader	Seats	+/–
YSR Congress Party	Y. S. Jagan Mohan Reddy	17	+13
Telugu Desam Party	Yanamala Rama Krishnudu	4	−9
Progressive Democratic Front		0	−3
Bharatiya Janata Party	Somu Veerraju	1	+1
This lists parties that won seats. See the complete results below.

The 2023 Andhra Pradesh Legislative Council elections were held as part of a routine six-year cycle among different types of Legislative Council Constituencies in Andhra Pradesh in March 2023 to elect 21 of its 58 members, of which the through their legislators elect 50 and the remaining 8 are appointed by the governor.

== Schedule ==
Constituency	Members retiring	Date of retirement	Date of poll
Graduates	3	29 March 2023	13 March 2023
Teachers	2	29 March 2023	13 March 2023
Local Authorities	2	29 March 2023	13 March 2023
Local Authorities	7	1 May 2023	13 March 2023
Member of Legislative Assembly	7	29 March 2023	23 March 2023

== Members retiring and elected ==
=== Graduates elected constituencies ===
#	Constituency	Previous MLC	Party	Term end	Elected MLC	Party
1	Prakasam–Nellore–Chittoor	Yandlapalli Srinivasulu Reddy	PDF	29-03-2023	Kancharla Srikanth	TDP
2	Kadapa–Anantapur–Kurnool	Vennapusa Gopal Reddy	YSRCP	29-03-2023	Bhumireddy Rama Gopal Reddy	TDP
3	Srikakulam–Vizianagaram–Visakhapatnam	P. V. N. Madhav	BJP	29-03-2023	Vepada Chiranjeevi Rao	TDP

=== Teachers elected constituencies ===
#	Constituency	Previous MLC	Party	Term end	Elected MLC	Party
1	Prakasam–Nellore–Chittoor	Vitapu Balasubrahmanyam	PDF	29-03-2023	Parvathareddy Chandra Sekhar Reddy	YSRCP
2	Kadapa–Anantapur–Kurnool	Katti Narasimha Reddy	PDF	29-03-2023	M. V. Ramachandra Reddy	YSRCP

=== Local Authorities elected constituencies ===
#	Constituency	Previous MLC	Party	Term end	Elected MLC	Party
1	Anantapur	Gunapati Deepak Reddy	TDP	29-03-2023	S. Mangamma	YSRCP
2	Kadapa	Mareedu Ravindranatha Reddy	TDP	29-03-2023	Ponnapudi Rama Subbareddy	YSRCP
3	Nellore	Vakati Narayana Reddy	TDP	01-05-2023	Meriga Muralidhar	YSRCP
4	West Godavari	Angara Rama Mohan	TDP	01-05-2023	Kavuru Srinivas	YSRCP
5	West Godavari	Manthena Venkata Satyanarayana Raju	TDP	01-05-2023	Vanka Ravindranath	YSRCP
6	East Godavari	Chikkala Ramachandra Rao	TDP	01-05-2023	Kuchipudi Satyanarayana Rao	YSRCP
7	Sriakulam	Satrucharla Vijaya Rama Raju	TDP	01-05-2023	Narthu Ramarao	YSRCP
8	Chittoor	B. N. Rajasimhulu	TDP	01-05-2023	Subramanyam Sipai	YSRCP
9	Kurnool	K. E. Prabhakar	TDP	01-05-2023	A. Madhusudhan	YSRCP

=== Members of Legislative Assembly elected members ===
#	Previous MLC	Party	Term end	Elected MLC	Party
1	Challa Bhageerath Reddy	YSRCP	29-03-2023	Bommi Israel	YSRCP
2	Nara Lokesh	TDP	29-03-2023	Chandragiri Yesuratnam	YSRCP
3	Pothula Suneetha	TDP	29-03-2023	Pothula Suneetha	YSRCP
4	Batchula Arjunudu	TDP	29-03-2023	Marri Rajasekhar	YSRCP
5	Dokka Manikya Vara Prasad	TDP	29-03-2023	Kola Guruvulu	YSRCP
6	P. V. V. Suryanarayana Raju	YSRCP	29-03-2023	P. V. V. Suryanarayana Raju	YSRCP
7	Gangula Prabhakar Reddy	YSRCP	29-03-2023	Panchumarthi Anuradha	TDP

== See also ==
- Elections in Andhra Pradesh
- 2023 elections in India
