= 2025 Andhra Pradesh Legislative Council election =

Elections for the Upper House of Andhra Pradesh Legislature

- 2025
- 8 seats in the Andhra Pradesh Legislative Council
Party	Leader	Seats	+/–
YSR Congress Party	Botsa Satyanarayana	0	−1
Telugu Desam Party	N. Chandrababu Naidu	5	+1
Bharatiya Janata Party	Somu Veerraju	1	+1
Janasena Party	Pawan Kalyan	1	+1
Progressive Democratic Front		0	−2
This lists parties that won seats. See the complete results below.

The 2025 Andhra Pradesh Legislative Council elections were held as part of a routine six-year cycle among different types of Legislative Council Constituencies in Andhra Pradesh in March 2025 to elect 8 of its 58 members, of which 8 are appointed by the governor.

== Schedule ==
Constituency	Members retiring	Date of retirement	Date of poll
Graduates	2	29 March 2025	27 February 2025
Teachers	1	29 March 2025	27 February 2025
Member of Legislative Assembly	5	29 March 2025	20 March 2025

== Members retiring and elected ==
=== Graduates elected constituencies ===
#	Constituency	Previous MLC	Party	Term end	Elected MLC	Party
1	Krishna–Guntur	K. S. Lakshmana Rao	PDF	29-03-2025	Alapati Rajendra Prasad	TDP
2	East Godavari–West Godavari	Illa Venkateswara Rao	PDF	29-03-2025	Perabathula Rajasekharam	TDP

=== Teachers elected constituencies ===
#	Constituency	Previous MLC	Party	Term end	Elected MLC	Party
1	Vizianagaram–Visakhapatnam–Srikakulam	Pakalapati Raghu Varma	IND	29-03-2025	Gade Srinivasulu Naidu	IND

=== Members of Legislative Assembly elected members ===
#	Previous MLC	Party	Term end	Elected MLC	Party
1	Janga Krishna Murthy	YSRCP	29-03-2025	Beeda Ravi Chandra	TDP
2	Duvvarapu Rama Rao	TDP	29-03-2025	B. Tirumala Naidu	TDP
3	Parchuri Ashok Babu	TDP	29-03-2025	Kavali Greeshma	TDP
4	B. Tirumala Naidu	TDP	29-03-2025	Nagendra Babu	JSP
5	Yanamala Ramakrishnudu	TDP	29-03-2025	Somu Veerraju	BJP

== See also ==
- Elections in Andhra Pradesh
- 2025 elections in India
