= List of constituencies of the Andhra Pradesh Legislative Council =

Andhra Pradesh Legislative Council is the upper house of the bicameral legislature of Andhra Pradesh, India. The Andhra Pradesh Legislative Council is a permanent body comprising 58 members.

== Term ==
The Andhra Pradesh Legislative Council is a permanent body with one-third of its members retiring every two years. House strength is 58 and the term of members is 6 years (renewable).

== Constituencies and Members (58) ==
Proportion	Seats	Method of Selection
One-third (1/3rd)	20	Elected by the members of the Legislative Assembly by proportional representation using the Single Transferable Vote System
One-third (1/3rd)	20	Elected by the members of local self governmental bodies like corporations, municipalities and district boards.
One-sixth (1/6th)	8	Nominated by the Governor on the advice of the cabinet. They were supposed to have excelled in fields like arts, science, literature, cooperative movement or social service
One-twelfth (1/12th)	5	Elected by an electorate consisting of electors who have held Graduate degrees for a minimum of three years
One-twelfth (1/12th)	5	Elected by an electorate consisting of teachers of secondary schools, colleges and universities with a minimum experience of three years

Among the 58 members of the Legislative Council, 20 are elected by the Andhra Pradesh Legislative Assembly members, 20 are elected by local authorities, 5 are elected by the Graduates, 5 are elected by the Teachers and 8 members are nominated by the Governor of Andhra Pradesh.

The present Council coustituencies were established by the "Delimitation of Council Constituencies (Andhra Pradesh) Order, 2006", and it was modified by the Andhra Pradesh Reorganisation Act, 2014. While the Council's established in 2007 had a total of 90 members, consisting of 31 elected by MLAs, 31 elected from Local Authorities’, 8 from Graduates’ and 8 from Teachers’ Constituencies and the remaining 12 members to be nominated by the Governor. After the bifurcation of the state it attained its present number.

- MLA - elected by Members of Andhra Pradesh Legislative Assembly
- LA - Local Authorities
- GR - Graduates
- TR - Teachers
- NOM - Nominated

State	Modified by	MLA	LA	NOM	TR	GR
State	Modified by	1/3	1/3	1/6	1/12	1/12
United Andhra Pradesh	Delimitation Order, 2006	31	31	12	8	8
Andhra Pradesh	As per Act 6 of 2014	17	17	6	5	5
Andhra Pradesh	Amendment by Act 12 of 2015 (Currtent numbers)	20	20	8	5	5
Telangana	As per Act 6 of 2014	14	14	6	3	3

=== Elected from Local Authorities' constituencies (20) ===
#	Constituency	Geographical Area Covered (Note: As it is in 2006 Delimitation)	No of seats
1	Srikakulam	Srikakulam	1
2	Vizianagaram	Vizianagaram	1
3	Visakhapatnam	Visakhapatnam	2
4	East Godavari	East Godavari	2
5	West Godavari	West Godavari	2
6	Krishna	Krishna	2
7	Guntur	Guntur	2
8	Prakasam	Prakasam	1
9	Nellore	Nellore	1
10	Chittoor	Chittoor	2
11	Kadapa	Kadapa	1
12	Anantapur	Anantapur	2
13	Kurnool	Kurnool	1

=== Elected from Graduates constituencies (5) ===
#	Constituency	Geographical Area Covered	No of seats
1	Srikakulam–Vizianagaram–Visakhapatnam	Srikakulam, Vizianagaram, Visakhapatnam	1
2	East Godavari–West Godavari	East Godavari, West Godavari	1
3	Krishna–Guntur	Krishna, Guntur	1
4	Prakasam–Nellore–Chittoor	Prakasam, Nellore, Chittoor	1
5	Kadapa–Kurnool–Anantapur	Kadapa, Anantapur, Kurnool	1

=== Elected from Teachers' constituencies (5) ===
#	Constituency	Geographical Area Covered	No of seats
1	Srikakulam–Vizianagaram–Visakhapatnam	Srikakulam, Vizianagaram, Visakhapatnam	1
2	East Godavari–West Godavari	East Godavari, West Godavari	1
3	Krishna–Guntur	Krishna, Guntur	1
4	Prakasam–Nellore–Chittoor	Prakasam, Nellore, Chittoor	1
5	Kadapa–Kurnool–Anantapur	Kadapa, Anantapur, Kurnool	1

== See also ==
- Andhra Pradesh Legislative Council
- List of chief ministers of Andhra Pradesh
- List of governors of Andhra Pradesh
- List of chairmen of the Andhra Pradesh Legislative Council
