= Yanamala =

Yanamala (Telugu: యనమల) is a Telugu surname. Yenamala is a variant of this surname. Notable people with the surname include:

- Yanamala Divya (born 1984), Indian politician
- Yanamala Rama Krishnudu (born 1951), Indian politician
