= State Legislative Councils of India =

Upper house of six states in India

The State Legislative Council, also known as the Vidhan Parishad or the Saasana Mandali, is the upper house in those states of India that have a bicameral state legislature; the lower house being the State Legislative Assembly. Its establishment is defined in Article 169 of the Constitution of India.

Only 6 out of 28 states have a Legislative Council. These are Andhra Pradesh, Bihar, Karnataka, Maharashtra, Telangana, and Uttar Pradesh. No union territory has a legislative council.

== Member of the Legislative Council ==
An MLC, or Member of a State Legislative Council, must be a citizen of India, at least 30 years old, mentally sound, not an insolvent, and must be an enrolled voter of the state. A member may not be a Member of Parliament and Member of the State Legislative Assembly at the same time. A member must not hold any office of profit under the Government of India or the Government of any state.
The tenure of the MLCs is six years. One-third of the members of State Legislative Council retire after every two years. This arrangement parallels that for the Rajya Sabha, the upper house of the Parliament of India.

== Composition ==
The size of the State Legislative Council cannot be more than one third of the membership of the State Legislative Assembly. However, its size cannot be less than 40 members. These members elect the chairman and Deputy Chairman of the State Legislative Council.

MLCs are chosen in the following manner:

- One third are elected by the members of local bodies such as municipalities, Gram panchayats, Panchayat samitis and district councils.
- One third are elected by the members of Legislative Assembly of the State from among the persons who are not members of the State Legislative Assembly.
- One sixth are nominated by the Governor from persons having knowledge or practical experience in fields such as literature, science, arts, the co-operative movement and social services.
- One twelfth are elected by persons who are graduates of three years' standing residing in that state.
- One twelfth are elected by teachers who had spent at least three years in teaching in educational institutions within the state not lower than secondary schools, including colleges and universities.

== Creation, Abolition and Roles of State Legislative Councils ==
According to the Article 169 of the Constitution of India, the Parliament of India can create or abolish the State Legislative Council of a state if that state's legislature passes a resolution for that with a special majority. As of 9 January 2024, 6 out of the 28 states have State Legislative Council.

The existence of a State Legislative Council has proven politically controversial. A number of states that have had their Legislative Council abolished have subsequently requested its re-establishment; conversely, proposals for the re-establishment of the Legislative Council for a state have also met with opposition. Proposals for abolition or re-establishment of a state's Legislative Council require confirmation by the Parliament of India.

The Constitution of India gives limited power to the State Legislative Council. The State Legislative Council can neither form or dissolve a state government. The State Legislative Council also have no role in the passing of money bills. Further per Article 197, the Legislative Assembly of a State has overriding powers over its Legislative Council, in that where any bill passed by the Assembly is rejected by the Council but is passed again by the Assembly with or without any amendments suggested by the Council, the bill is deemed to have been passed by both the houses in the manner that it is passed by the Assembly for the second time. But some of the powers it has is that the chairman and Deputy Chairman of the State Legislative Council enjoy the same status of Cabinet Ministers in the state.

== Current State Legislative Councils ==
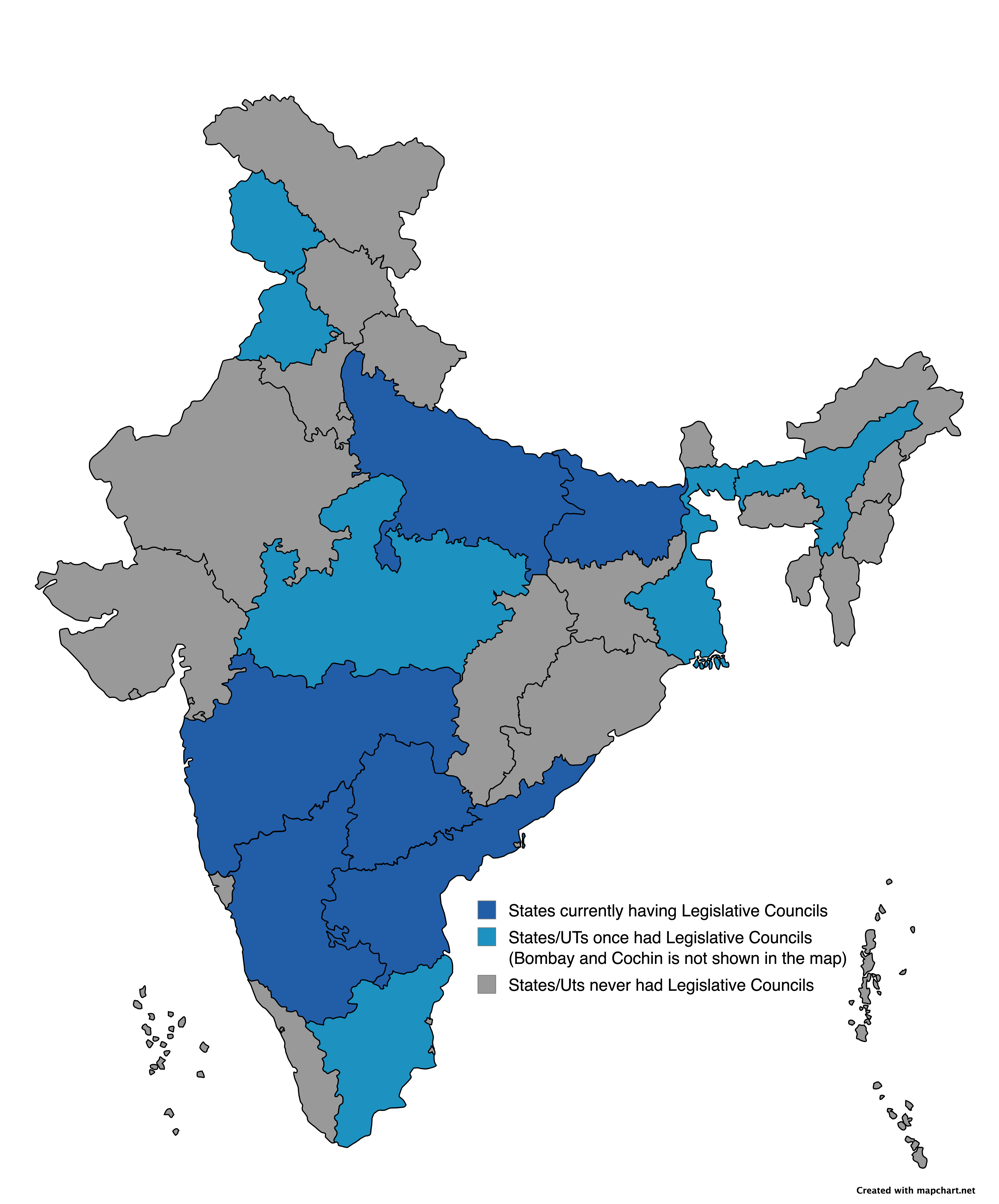
Map Shows the Indian States and Union Territories have Legislative Councils

Legislative Council	Seat(s)	House strength			Ruling party	State Alliance	National Alliance
Legislative Council	Seat(s)	Elected	Nom.	Total	Ruling party	State Alliance	National Alliance
Andhra Pradesh	Amaravati	50	8	58	Telugu Desam Party	Kutami	NDA
Bihar	Patna	63	12	75	Bharatiya Janata Party	NDA	NDA
Karnataka	Bengaluru (summer); Belagavi (winter)	64	11	75	Indian National Congress	INDIA	INDIA
Maharashtra	Mumbai (summer); Nagpur (winter)	66	12	78	Bharatiya Janata Party	NDA	NDA
Telangana	Hyderabad	34	6	40	Indian National Congress	INDIA	INDIA
Uttar Pradesh	Lucknow	90	10	100	Bharatiya Janata Party	NDA	NDA
Total	—	367	59	426	—		

== State Legislative Councils by ruling parties ==
Ruling party	States/UTs
NDA (4)
Bharatiya Janata Party	3
Telugu Desam Party	1
INDIA (2)
Indian National Congress	2

The Bharatiya Janata Party-led National Democratic Alliance is in power in 4 legislative councils; the Indian National Congress-led Indian National Developmental Inclusive Alliance is in power in 2 legislative councils; and 30 other states/union territories do not have a legislative council.

== Former State Legislative Councils ==
Council	Seat(s)	House strength	Years active	Abolished by
Assam Legislative Council	Shillong	21-22	1935-1947	India (Provincial Legislatures) Order, 1947
Bombay Legislative Council	Bombay	78	1861–1960	Bombay State Reorganisation Act, 1960
Jammu and Kashmir Legislative Council	Srinagar (summer); Jammu (winter)	36	1957–2019	Jammu and Kashmir Reorganisation Act, 2019
Madhya Pradesh Legislative Council	Bhopal	90	–	(Note: Provisions were made in the article 168 of the constitution for establishment of Madhya Pradesh Legislative Council by The Constitution (Seventh Amendment) Act, 1956 but the provision did'n come into effect by date appointed by the President. As the date was never appointed.)
Punjab Legislative Council	Chandigarh	39	1952–1969	Punjab Legislative Council (Abolition) Act, 1969
Tamil Nadu Legislative Council	Chennai	78	1861–1986	Tamil Nadu Legislative Council (Abolition) Act, 1986
West Bengal Legislative Council	Kolkata	98	1952–1969	West Bengal Legislative Council (Abolition) Act, 1969

== Proposed State Legislative Councils ==
There are currently 4 proposals for creation of Legislative Councils:

- Rajasthan Legislative Council - On April 18, 2012, Rajasthan Legislative Assembly passed a resolution to create a Legislative Council for the state of Rajasthan with 66 members. The Rajasthan Legislative Council Bill, 2013 was introduced in the Rajya Sabha on August 6, 2013, and has been referred to the Standing Committee on Law and Justice.
- West Bengal Legislative Council - On 6 July 2021, West Bengal Legislative Assembly passed a resolution supporting an ad-hoc committee report that favoured the creation of Legislative Council for the state of West Bengal.
- Odisha Legislative Council - On 18 September 2018, Odisha Legislative Assembly passed a resolution for setting up a Legislative Council for the state of Odisha with 49 members.
- Assam Legislative Council - on 14 July 2013, Assam Legislative Assembly passed a resolution for the creation of Legislative Council in the state of Assam with 42 members. The Assam Legislative Council Bill, 2013 was introduced in the Rajya Sabha on 3 December 2013.

== Criticism and Support ==
The State Legislative Councils are criticised for being unnecessary. It is considered a burden on the state budget and cause delays in passing legislation. State legislative council helps the defeated leaders to get a seat in the state legislature. This reduces the feeling of democracy, since the leaders are elected indirectly. These are the reasons why most of the states don't prefer legislative councils.

Other states support the establishment of legislative councils, arguing that they represent the local governments and also give voice to people having expertise in various fields (through Gubernatorial nominations).

== See also ==
- State Legislature
- Upper house
- Rajya Sabha
- Council of State
- Legislative council
- State governments of India
- Politics of India
