= Kancharla =

Kancharla (Telugu: కంచర్ల) or Kancherla is a Telugu surname. Notable people with the surname include:

- Kancharla Gopanna (c. 1620 – 1688), Indian saint-poet popularly known as Bhadrachala Ramadasu
- Kancharla Srikanth (born 1972), Indian politician
- Kancherla Keshava Rao (born 1939), Indian politician popularly known as KK

== Kancharla ==
Kancharla (Telugu: కంచర్ల), also spelt Kancherla, is a Telugu surname primarily associated with the states of Andhra Pradesh and Telangana, with smaller populations found in Maharashtra and among the Telugu diaspora. The surname is geographical in origin and is believed to be derived from a place or region named Kancharla/Cherla in the Telugu-speaking region. Historical surname references associate the name with settlements near the Godavari region, although the precise ancestral origin is not conclusively established.

The surname is found among several Telugu-speaking communities, including Kamma, Reddy, and other agricultural and landowning groups. Over the centuries, migration for agriculture, trade, education, government service, and business contributed to the spread of Kancharla families across Andhra Pradesh, Telangana, Maharashtra, and other parts of India.

Kancharla is also borne by several notable individuals, including Kancharla Gopanna (Bhadrachala Ramadasu), the 17th-century saint-poet and devotee of Lord Rama, and Kancharla Srikanth, an Indian politician. The surname remains closely associated with Telugu cultural heritage and is predominantly found in the Krishna, Guntur, East Godavari, Prakasam, and surrounding districts of Andhra Pradesh and Telangana.
