= Paruchuri =

Paruchuri (Telugu: పరుచూరి) is a Telugu surname. Notable people with the surname include:

- Paruchuri Ashok Babu (born 1959), Indian politician
- Paruchuri Gopala Krishna (born 1947), Indian screenwriter
- Paruchuri Venkateswara Rao (born 1944), Indian screenwriter
