= Vitapu Balasubrahmanyam =

Indian politician

Member of Andhra Pradesh Legislative Council
- Incumbent
- Assumed office 30 March 2007
- Constituency: Prakasam-Nellore-Chittoor Teachers

Pro tem Chairman of Andhra Pradesh Legislative Council
- In office 19 June 2021 – 18 November 2021

Personal details
- Born: 30 June 1950 (age 76) Mamuduru village, Chejerla, Nellore district, Andhra Pradesh
- Party: Progressive Democratic Front
- Spouse: Dadithota Kumari Padmini
- Parent: V. Subba Ramaiah
- Occupation: Politician

Vitapu Balasubrahmanyam is an Indian politician from the state of Andhra Pradesh. He is currently a member of the Andhra Pradesh Legislative Council, and was formerly its pro tem Speaker.

== Early life and education ==
Vitapu Balasubrahmanyam was born on 30 June 1950 in Mamuduru village in Nellore district. He completed his M.A. in Telugu language from Sri Venkateswara University in Tirupati, Andhra Pradesh.

== Political career ==
Balasubrahmanyam won his first election as MLC from Prakasam-Nellore-Chittoor Teachers constituency in 2007. In 2011 he won his second election. In 2017 he won his third election. He was appointed pro-tem chairman from June 2021 to November 2021.
