= Sri Y N College =

College in Andhra Pradesh, India

Sri Yerramilli Narayana Murthy College
- Former names: The Narsapur College
- Motto: Tamasoma Jyotirgamaya
- Type: Government aided college
- Established: 1948
- Affiliations: Autonomous (formerly with Adikavi Nannaya University)
- Chairman: Sub Collector of Narsapur (Ex Officio)
- Principal: Apparao (KVCS, MSc, MPhil, PhD)
- Director: N. Chinta Rao (PG Courses)
- Location: Narasapuram, West Godavari, Andhra Pradesh, India
- Nickname: YN college
- Website: sriyncollege.org

Sri Yerramilli Narayanamurthy College, or Sri Y N College, is a higher educational institute in Narsapuram, a town of the West Godavari district, Andhra Pradesh, India. The college is government-aided, autonomous and NAAC Grade A+.

== Present ==
The college has grown to a large institution offering nine postgraduate courses of study in addition to degree and pre-degree courses with a multitude of subject combinations, and is recognized by the UGC as a lead college in the Andhra University area. This institution got autonomous status from UGC from 2007-08 academic year

The college was the first NAAC accredited "A+" grade college in Andhra Pradesh. It was a government aided college. The postgraduate centre of the college is named after Dr. C S Rao P G Centre. Its infrastructure includes Administrative, Postgraduate, Physical and Biological Science blocks, auditorium, library buildings for undergraduate and postgraduate, gymnasium, Seminar Hall, Computer labs.

== Golden Jubilee ==
The college's Golden Jubilee celebrations took place during 1999–2000. A four-day cultural extravaganza to commemorate the Golden Jubilee was run. A first day postal cover was brought out as a token of gratitude to the founder, Sri Yerramilli Narayana Murthy.

A B Vajpayee, former Prime Minister of India, said "ever since it was founded in 1949, this college has made significant contribution by introducing vocational courses in Computer sciences, Electronics and Fisheries and offering courses like M.B.A and M.C.A which are the need of the hour. It is heartening that this college has been recognized by U.G.C as one of the lead colleges in Andhra University. PM wishes the Management, Faculty and the students all success in the coming years."

K R Narayanan, former President of India extended his "warm Greetings and felicitations to the students, teachers & staff and the Management and wished celebrations all success."

== Notable alumni ==
- Chiranjeevi, film actor and politician
- Dasari Narayana Rao, film director, producer, writer, actor and politician
- Krishnam Raju, actor, politician
- Shariff Mohammed Ahmed, politician and Chairman of Andhra Pradesh Legislative Council
- Dhavala Satyam, Senior film director known for his works on Communist philosophy and revolutionary movies
