= Dadisetti Ramalingeswara Rao =

Indian politician

Minister of Roads & Buildings Government of Andhra Pradesh
- In office 11 April 2022 – 4 June 2024
- Governor: Biswabhusan Harichandan; S. Abdul Nazeer
- Chief Minister: Y. S. Jagan Mohan Reddy
- Preceded by: Malagundla Sankaranarayana
- Succeeded by: B. C. Janardhan Reddy

Member of Legislative Assembly Andhra Pradesh
- In office 2014–2024
- Preceded by: Venkata Krishnam Raju Sriraja Vatsavayi
- Succeeded by: Yanamala Divya
- Constituency: Tuni

Dadisetti Ramalingeswara Rao, commonly known as Raja, is the current Member of the Legislative Assembly (India) of Tuni in East Godavari District. He is from the YSR Congress Party.

== Personal life ==
Dadisetti Ramalingeswara Rao was born on 22 March 1976 to Sri Dadisetti Sankara Rao and Smt Satyanarayanamma in Tuni, Andhra Pradesh. They are traditionally a family of gold merchants. Rao graduated in Tuni. At the age of 32, he decided to enter politics full-time and joined the YSR Congress Party.

He is married to Smt Lakshmi Chaitanya and has one son and one daughter.

== Politics ==
Ramalingeswara Rao contested MLA elections for the first time in 2014 and won with a majority of 19,500 votes. He is currently a member of the committee on public accounts in the Andhra Pradesh Legislative Assembly, Tuni In 2019. Now he is Minister of A.P. cabinet.
