= State legislatures of India =

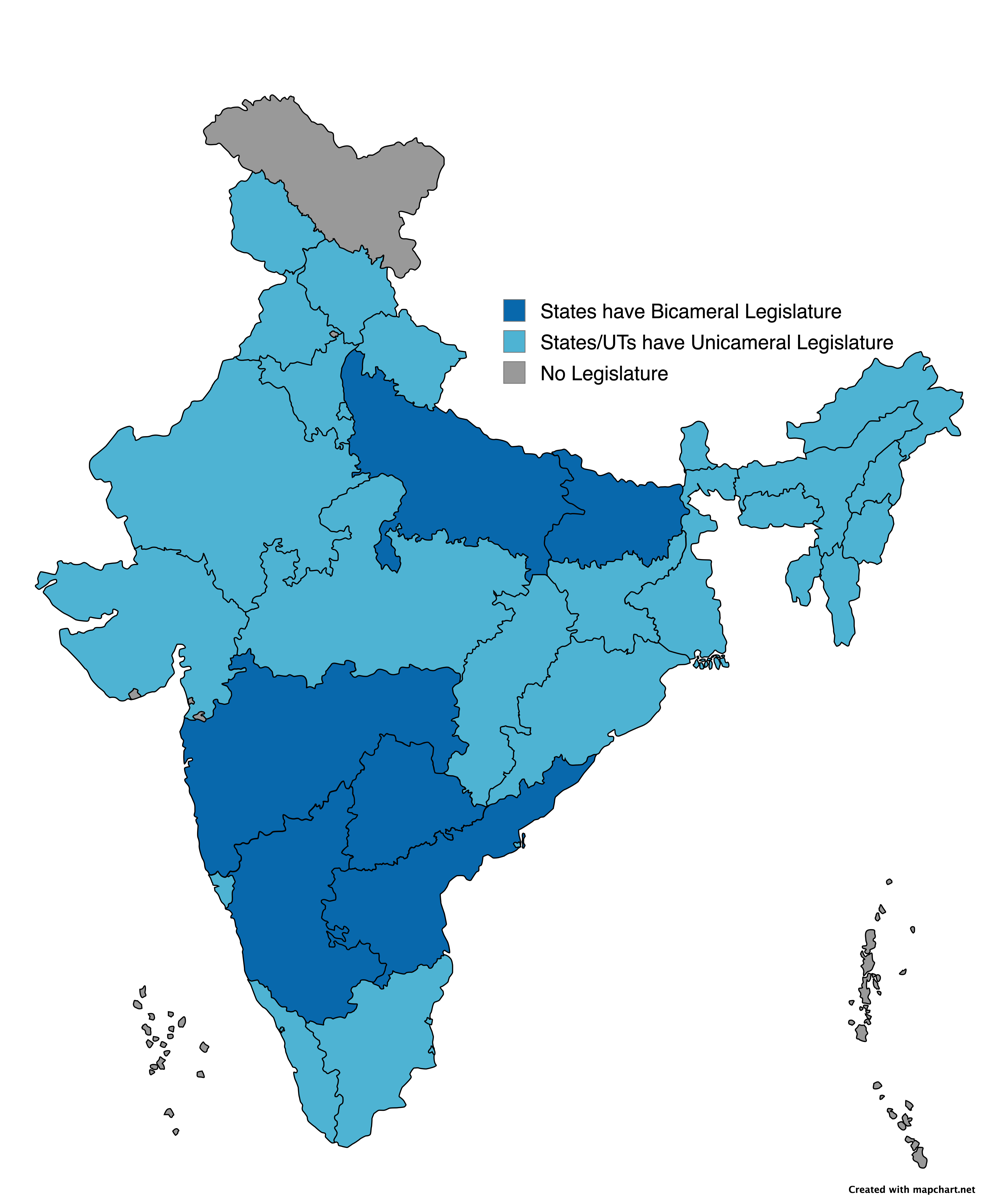
Map shows states having Bicameral and Unicameral Legislature in India.

The State Legislature is the law-making body of the State. The State legislatures of India comprises the State Legislative Assembly and the Legislative Council, both of which function by researching, writing, and passing the legislation.

- State Legislative Councils
- State Legislative Assemblies

== See also ==
- Legislatures of British India
