= Tuni Assembly constituency =

Constituency of the Andhra Pradesh Legislative Assembly, India

Coordinates: 17.36°N 82.55°E

Tuni
- Constituency No. 35 for the Andhra Pradesh Legislative Assembly
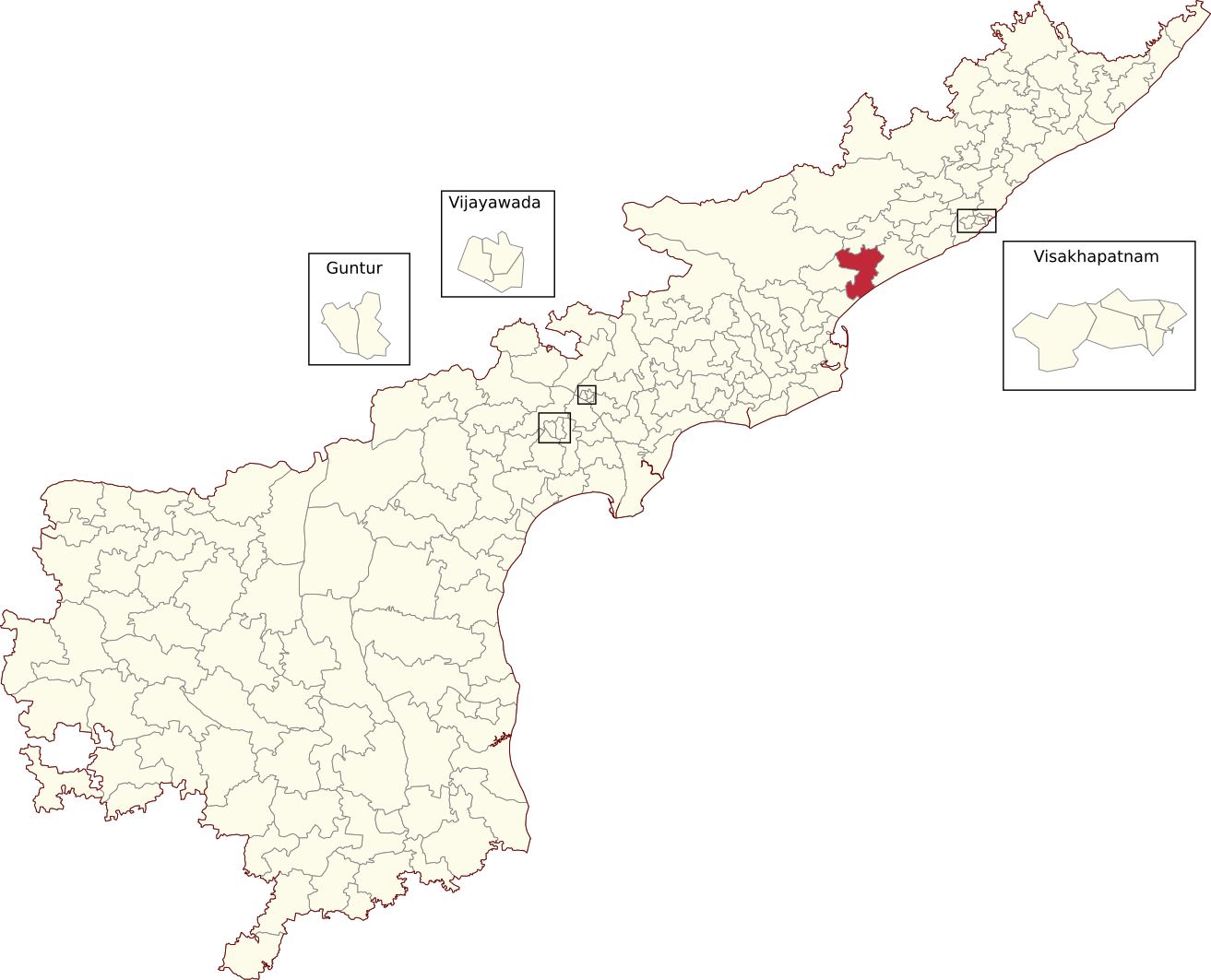
- Location of Tuni Assembly constituency within Andhra Pradesh

Constituency details
- Country: India
- Region: South India
- State: Andhra Pradesh
- District: Kakinada
- Lok Sabha constituency: Kakinada
- Established: 1951
- Total electors: 212,900
- Reservation: None

Member of Legislative Assembly
- 16th Andhra Pradesh Legislative Assembly
- Incumbent Yanamala Divya
- Party: TDP
- Alliance: NDA
- Elected year: 2024

Tuni Assembly constituency is a constituency in Kakinada district of Andhra Pradesh that elects representatives to the Andhra Pradesh Legislative Assembly in India. It is one of the seven assembly segments of Kakinada Lok Sabha constituency.

Yanamala Divya is the current MLA of the constituency, having won the 2024 Andhra Pradesh Legislative Assembly election from YSR Congress Party. As of 2019, there are a total of 212,900 electors in the constituency. The constituency was established in 1951, as per the Delimitation Orders (1951).

== Mandals ==
The three mandals that form the assembly constituency are:

Mandal
Thondangi
Kotananduru
Tuni

== Members of the Legislative Assembly ==
Year	Member	Political party
1952	Raja V. V. Krishnam Raju Bahadur	Indian National Congress
1955	Raja V. V. Krishnam Raju Bahadur	Indian National Congress
1962	Raja V. V. Krishnam Raju Bahadur	Indian National Congress
1967	Raja V. V. Krishnam Raju Bahadur	Indian National Congress
1972	N. Vijayalakshmi	Indian National Congress
1978	N. Vijayalakshmi	Indian National Congress
1983	Yanamala Rama Krishnudu	Telugu Desam Party
1985	Yanamala Rama Krishnudu	Telugu Desam Party
1989	Yanamala Rama Krishnudu	Telugu Desam Party
1994	Yanamala Rama Krishnudu	Telugu Desam Party
1999	Yanamala Rama Krishnudu	Telugu Desam Party
2004	Yanamala Rama Krishnudu	Telugu Desam Party
2009	Ashok Babu	Indian National Congress
2014	Dadisetti Raja	YSR Congress Party
2019	Dadisetti Raja	YSR Congress Party
2024	Yanamala Divya	Telugu Desam Party

== Election results ==
=== 1952 ===
1952 Madras Legislative Assembly election: Tuni
Party	Candidate	Votes	%	±%
INC	Raju Vatsereya Venkata Krishna Raju Bahadur	20,498	44.45	44.45
KMPP	Yenumula Venkanna Dora	12,917	28.01	
RPI	Gare Appa Rao	6,351	13.77	
Independent	Somasethu Venkam Dore	3,614	7.84	
SP	Venkata Rao, Eranki	2,738	5.94	
Margin of victory		7,581	16.44	
Turnout		46,118	60.54	
Registered electors		76,175		
INC win (new seat)				

=== 1955 ===
1955 Andhra Pradesh Legislative Assembly election: Tuni
Party	Candidate	Votes	%	±%
INC	Raja Vatsavaya Venkata Krishnamuraj Bahadur	22,088		
CPI	Inuganti Narayanarao	12,366		
INC gain from CPI		Swing		

=== 1962 ===
1962 Andhra Pradesh Legislative Assembly election: Tuni
Party	Candidate	Votes	%	±%
INC	Raja V. V. Krishnamraju Bahadur	23,832		
PSP	Katha Radhakrishnamurty	15668		
INC gain from PSP		Swing		

=== 1967 ===
1967 Andhra Pradesh Legislative Assembly election: Tuni
Party	Candidate	Votes	%	±%
INC	V. V. Krishnamraju	32,920		
PSP	K. Janardhanarao	23776		
INC gain from PSP		Swing		

=== 1972 ===
1972 Andhra Pradesh Legislative Assembly election: Tuni
Party	Candidate	Votes	%	±%
INC	N Vijayalakshmi	40,521		
Independent	Bandaru Kannaiah Dora	17713		
INC gain from Independent		Swing		

=== 1983 ===
1983 Andhra Pradesh Legislative Assembly election: Tuni
Party	Candidate	Votes	%	±%
TDP	Yanamala Rama Krishnudu	48,738		
INC	Vijayalakashmidevi Mirza Nallaparaju	27058		
TDP gain from INC		Swing		

=== 1985 ===
1985 Andhra Pradesh Legislative Assembly election: Tuni
Party	Candidate	Votes	%	±%
TDP	Yanamala Rama Krishnudu	50,292		
INC	M. N. Vijayalakshmi Devi	33988		
TDP hold		Swing		

=== 1989 ===
1989 Andhra Pradesh Legislative Assembly election: Tuni
Party	Candidate	Votes	%	±%
TDP	Yanamala Rama Krishnudu	51,139		
INC	Sri Raju Vatsavayi Krishnam Raju Bahadur	48512		
TDP hold		Swing		

=== 1994 ===
1994 Andhra Pradesh Legislative Assembly election: Tuni
Party	Candidate	Votes	%	±%
TDP	Yanamala Rama Krishnudu	59,250		
INC	Maddala Venkata Chalapathi Rao	41457		
TDP hold		Swing		

=== 1999 ===
1999 Andhra Pradesh Legislative Assembly election: Tuni
Party	Candidate	Votes	%	±%
TDP	Yanamala Ramakrishnudu	52,921		
Independent	Sri Raja Vatsavayi Venkata Krishnam Raju	48747		
TDP hold		Swing		

=== 2004 ===
2004 Andhra Pradesh Legislative Assembly election: Tuni
Party	Candidate	Votes	%	±%
TDP	Yanamala Rama Krishnudu	61,794	49.78	+5.10
INC	S.R.V.V. Krishnam Raju	58,059	46.77	+5.61
Majority		3,735	3.01	
Turnout		124,144	76.25	+3.60
TDP hold		Swing		

=== 2009 ===
2009 Andhra Pradesh Legislative Assembly election: Tuni
Party	Candidate	Votes	%	±%
INC	Venkata Krishnam Raju Sriraja Vatsavayi	55,386	39.17	−7.60
TDP	Yanamala Rama Krishnudu	46,876	33.15	−16.63
PRP	Rongali Lakshmi	30,079	21.27	
Majority		8,510	6.02	
Turnout		141,416	78.59	+2.34
INC gain from TDP		Swing		

=== 2014 ===
2014 Andhra Pradesh Legislative Assembly election: Tuni
Party	Candidate	Votes	%	±%
YSRCP	Dadisetti Raja	84,755	52.98	
TDP	Yanamala Krishnudu	66,182	41.37	
Majority		18,573	11.61	
Turnout		159,970	80.95	+2.36
YSRCP gain from INC		Swing		

=== 2019 ===
2019 Andhra Pradesh Legislative Assembly election: Tuni
Party	Candidate	Votes	%	±%
YSRCP	Dadisetti Raja	92,459	52.13	
TDP	Yanamala Krishnudu	68,443	38.59	
JSP	Venkata Krishnamraju Srirajavatsavayi (Ashokbabu)	6,413	3.62	
Majority		24,016	13.54	
Turnout		177,375	83.3	
YSRCP hold		Swing		

=== 2024 ===
2024 Andhra Pradesh Legislative Assembly election: Tuni
Party	Candidate	Votes	%	±%
TDP	Yanamala Divya	97,206	51.31	+51.31
YSRCP	Dadisetti Raja	82,029	43.30	−7.52
INC	Gelam Srinivasa Rao	1,923	1.02	+1.2
NOTA	None Of The Above	3,434	1.81	−0.2
Majority		15,177	8.28	+8.28
Turnout		1,84,592	97.50	
TDP gain from YSRCP		Swing		

== See also ==
- List of constituencies of the Andhra Pradesh Legislative Assembly
