= K. Prathibha Bharathi =

Indian politician

Kavali Prathibha Bharathi
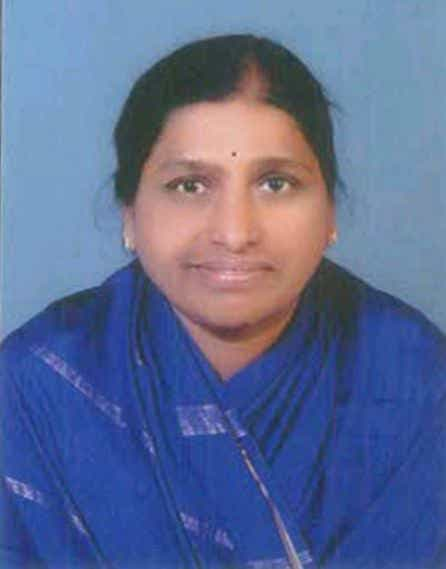

Member of Legislative Council Andhra Pradesh
- In office 1 June 2015 – 29 March 2017
- Preceded by: Paladugu Venkata Rao
- Constituency: Elected by MLAs

15th Speaker of the Andhra Pradesh Legislative Assembly
- In office 11 November 1999 - 30 May 2004
- Governor: Krishan Kant; Gopala Ramanujam; C. Rangarajan; Surjit Singh Barnala
- Chief Minister: N. Chandrababu Naidu
- Preceded by: Yanamala Rama Krishnudu
- Succeeded by: K R Suresh Reddy

Minister of Higher Education Government of Andhra Pradesh
- In office 1 September 1995 - 11 October 1999
- Governor: Krishan Kant; C. Rangarajan
- Chief Minister: N. Chandrababu Naidu
- Preceded by: Gali Muddu Krishnama Naidu
- Succeeded by: N. M. D. Farooq

Minister of Social Welfare, Women Welfare & Family welfare Government of Andhra Pradesh
- In office 3 December 1994 - 1 September 1995
- Governor: Krishan Kant
- Chief Minister: N. T. Rama Rao
- Succeeded by: K. Pushpaleela
- In office 10 January 1983 - 12 December 1989
- Governor: K. C. Abraham; Thakur Ramlal; Shankar Dayal Sharma; Kumudben Joshi
- Chief Minister: N. T. Rama Rao

Member of Legislative Assembly Andhra Pradesh
- In office 1983 - 2004
- Preceded by: Kothapalli Narasayya
- Succeeded by: Kondru Murali Mohan
- Constituency: Etcherla

Personal details
- Born: 6 February 1956 (age 70) Kavali, Srikakulam district
- Party: Telugu Desam Party
- Children: 1 (Kavali Greeshma)

Kavali Prathibha Bharathi (born 6 February 1956) is a politician from the Indian state of Andhra Pradesh. She is a former speaker of the Andhra Pradesh Legislative Assembly (1999–2004). She was the first woman speaker in Andhra Pradesh Legislative Assembly. She was Minister of Social Welfare, Health Welfare and Family Welfare 1983, 1985 and 1994 and served as the Minister of Higher Education between 1995 & 1999. She won successively 5 times (1983 - 2004) from Etcherla by representing Telugu Desam Party.

Pratibha Bharati was born into a politically active Dalit family in Kavali in the Srikakulam district. Her father (K. Punnaiah) and grandfather (K. Narayana) had previously served as Members of the Legislative Assembly.
