= Rajagolla Ramesh Yadav =

Indian politician

Member of the Andhra Pradesh Legislative Council
- In office 2023–2029

Personal details
- Born: 1 June 1982 (age 44)
- Party: YSR Congress Party
- Parent(s): R. Venkata Subbaiah,Ramasubbamma

Rajagolla Ramesh Yadav (born 4 June 1982) is an Indian politician who is member of the Andhra Pradesh Legislative Council through nomination by Governor representing YSR Congress Party
