= Mohammed Ruhulla =

Indian politician

MD Ruhulla is an Indian politician and a member of the Andhra Pradesh Legislative Council representing YSR Congress Party His mother Mohd Kareemunnisa was also an MLC.
