= Kavali, Vizianagaram district =

Kavali
- village
- Interactive map of Kavali
- Coordinates: 18.3921°N 83.8232°E
- Country: India
- State: Andhra Pradesh
- District: Vizianagaram

Population (2001)
  - Total: 886

Languages
  - Official: Telugu
- Time zone: UTC+5:30 (IST)
- Vehicle registration: AP-30

Kavali is a village under Santhakavati mandal in Vizianagaram district, Andhra Pradesh, India. Kavali Pratibha Bharati, better known as K. Pratibha Bharati - the former Speaker of Andhra Pradesh Legislative Assembly was born here in this village and also takes it as her family name.

== Demographics ==
As of 2001 Indian census, the demographic details of this village is as follows:

- Total Population: 886 in 203 Households.
- Male Population: 452
- Female Population: 434
- Children Under 6-years: 94 (Boys - 46 and Girls - 48)
- Total Literates: 495
