= Yanamala Rama Krishnudu =

Indian politician

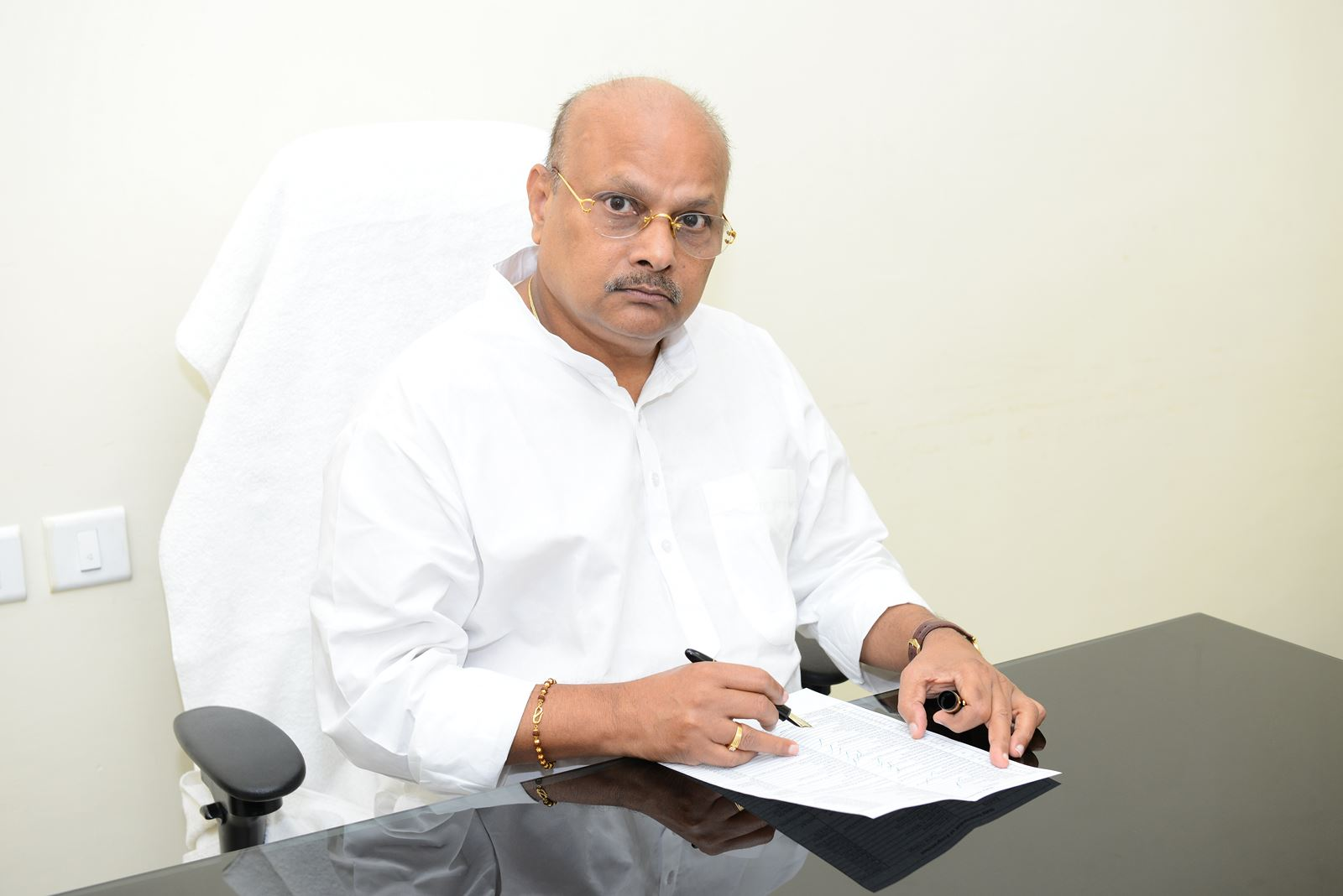

Leader of Opposition Andhra Pradesh Legislative Council
- In office 17 June 2019 – 11 June 2024
- Chairman: Shariff Mohammed Ahmed; Koyye Moshenu Raju
- Leader of the House: Y. S. Jagan Mohan Reddy
- Preceded by: Ummareddy Venkateswarlu
- Succeeded by: Lella Appi Reddy

Minister of Finance Planning, Commercial Taxes, Legislative Affairs Government of Andhra Pradesh
- In office 8 June 2014 – 30 May 2019
- Governor: E. S. L. Narasimhan
- Chief Minister: N. Chandrababu Naidu
- Preceded by: Anam Ramanarayana Reddy
- Succeeded by: Buganna Rajendranath Reddy

Member of Legislative Council Andhra Pradesh
- Incumbent
- Assumed office 2013
- Chairman: A. Chakrapani; N. M. D. Farooq; Shariff Mohammed Ahmed; Koyye Moshenu Raju
- Leader of the House: Kiran Kumar Reddy; N. Chandrababu Naidu; Y. S. Jagan Mohan Reddy
- Constituency: Elected By Members of Legislative Assembly (MLAs)

Minister of Finance Planning, Commercial Taxes, Legislative Affairs, Government of Andhra Pradesh
- In office 11 October 1999 – 13 May 2004
- Governor: C. Rangarajan; Surjit Singh Barnala
- Chief Minister: N. Chandrababu Naidu
- Preceded by: Ashok Gajapathi Raju
- Succeeded by: Konijeti Rosaiah

14th Speaker of the Andhra Pradesh Legislative Assembly
- In office 1 September 1995 – 11 October 1999
- Governor: Krishan Kant; Gopala Ramanujam; C. Rangarajan
- Chief Minister: N. Chandrababu Naidu
- Preceded by: D. Sripada Rao
- Succeeded by: K. Pratibha Bharati

Minister of Cooperation Government of Andhra Pradesh
- In office 9 March 1985 – 3 December 1989
- Governor: Shankar Dayal Sharma
- Chief Minister: N.T. Rama Rao
- Preceded by: Eli Anjaneyulu

Minister of Law, Municipal administration & Urban development Government of Andhra Pradesh
- In office 9 January 1983 – 9 March 1985
- Governor: K. C. Abraham; Thakur Ramlal; Shankar Dayal Sharma
- Chief Minister: N.T. Rama Rao

Member of Legislative Assembly Andhra Pradesh
- In office 1983 - 2009
- Preceded by: N Vijayalakshmi
- Succeeded by: Raja Vatsavaya Venkata Krishnam Raju Bahadur (Ashok Babu)
- Constituency: Tuni

Personal details
- Born: 1951 (age 74–75) AV Nagaram, East Godavari district
- Party: Telugu Desam Party
- Spouse: Yanamala Vijaya Lakshmi

Yanamala Rama Krishnudu is an Indian politician from the State of Andhra Pradesh. He was the senior leader of Telugu Desam Party. He contested 7 times between 1983 and 2009 where he won 6 times successively and lost 1 time from Tuni. He served as the Cabinet Minister in First and Second NTR Governments. He was the Speaker of the Andhra Pradesh Legislative Assembly from 1995 to 1999. He is often regarded as an intellectual statesman and a technically sound leader.

He served as the Minister for Finance & Planning, Commercial Taxes, Legislative Affairs in Nara Chandrababu Naidu Government from June 2014 to May 2019.

Political offices
Preceded by D. Sripada Rao	Speaker of Andhra Pradesh; 1995–1999	Succeeded by K. Pratibha Bharati
