= K. S. Lakshmana Rao =

Indian politician

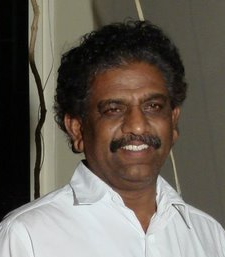

Member of Legislative Council, Andhra Pradesh
- In office 30 March 2019 – 30 March 2025
- Preceded by: Boddu Nageswara Rao
- Succeeded by: Alapati Rajendra Prasad
- Constituency: Krishna–Guntur Graduates
- In office 26 March 2007 – 25 March 2015
- Constituency: Krishna–Guntur Teachers

Personal details
- Party: Progressive Democratic Front (Andhra Pradesh)
- Occupation: Politician
- Profession: Lecturer

Kalagara Sai Lakshmana Rao, commonly known as K. S. Lakshmana Rao, was a member of Andhra Pradesh Legislative Council.

== Career ==
Roa worked as a lecturer in political science at the Hindu College in Guntur. As of March 2007, he is the state vice-president for Jan Vignana Vedika. He has been an active member of United Teacher Federation leading many movements to safeguard the interests of teachers.

In 2007 he contested the election for the Andhra Pradesh Legislative Council representing Krishna-Guntur Teachers Constituency. He won the election after the second-preference votes were counted and entered the Council for the first time. He secured 5,670 votes while the next contestant secured 2,210 votes.

He was re-elected in 2009 elections with over 76% of the first-preference votes. He securing 7,625 first presidential votes out of 10,211 votes polled, while the next contestant secured 1,928 votes.

He has contested in 2015 elections, held on 22 March to the same constituency, but has lost the election. He secured 5,383 votes while the winner secured 7,146 votes.

He was re-elected in 2019 elections to the same constituency with a majority of 68,120 votes. At the end of 12 rounds of counting, he secured 80,670 votes out of 1.49 lakh votes polled.
