= Gali Saraswathamma =

Indian politician

Member of the Andhra Pradesh Legislative Council
- Incumbent
- Assumed office 7 May 2018

Personal details
- Political party: Telugu Desam Party

Gali Saraswathamma is a member of the Andhra Pradesh Legislative Council, India. After the death of Gali Muddu Krishnama Naidu, she was given the ticket from the Telugu Desam Party. She won the election unopposed.
