= Kumbha Ravibabu =

Indian politician

Member of the Andhra Pradesh Legislative Council
- In office 2023–2029

Personal details
- Born: 12 May 1958 (age 67)
- Party: YSR Congress Party
- Parent(s): Kumbha Kotaoah,Narayamma

Kumbha Ravibabu (born 4 June 1958) is an Indian politician who is member of the Andhra Pradesh Legislative Council through nomination by Governor representing YSR Congress Party
