= Yanamala Divya =

Indian politician (born 1984)

Member of the Andhra Pradesh Legislative Assembly
- Incumbent
- Assumed office 2024
- Preceded by: Dadisetti Ramalingeswara Rao
- Constituency: Tuni

Personal details
- Born: 1984 (age 41–42)
- Party: Telugu Desam Party

Yanamala Divya (born 1984) is an Indian politician from Andhra Pradesh. She is a first-time member of the Andhra Pradesh Legislative Assembly from the Tuni Assembly constituency in East Godavari district. She represents the Telugu Desam Party and was elected in her debut election in the 2024 Andhra Pradesh Legislative Assembly election.

== Early life and education ==
Divya was born in Tuni and is a housewife. Her husband is in Indian Revenue Service. She completed her MBA from Osmania University in 2012. Earlier, she earned her engineering degree in Electronics and Communication, also from Osmania University, in 2006. She is the daughter of former Andhra Pradesh finance minister and former six time MLA from Tuni, Yanamala Rama Krishnudu. She has no criminal cases registered against her and she declared assets worth Rs.9.4 crore in the affidavit submitted to the Election Commission of India before the 2024 polls. Her paternal uncle, Yanamala Krishnudu, who lost the MLA election twice on TDP ticket, quit the party after 40 years as he was denied an MLC ticket.

== Political career ==
Following in the footsteps of her father, Divya entered politics and in 2023, she was appointed the district incharge. She was nominated for and won the 2024 Andhra Pradesh Legislative Assembly election from Tuni Assembly constituency representing Telugu Desam Party. She polled 97,206 votes and defeated her nearest rival, Dadisetti Raja of YSR Congress Party by a margin of 15,177 votes. She was appointed whip in Assembly on 12 November 2024.
