= Somu Veerraju =

Indian politician

Member of Andhra Pradesh Legislative Council
- Incumbent
- Assumed office 30 March 2025
- Chairman: Koyye Moshenu Raju
- Leader of the House: N. Chandrababu Naidu
- Constituency: Elected By MLAs
- In office 25 May 2015 – 24 May 2021
- Chairman: A. Chakrapani; N. M. D. Farooq; Koyye Moshenu Raju
- Leader of the House: N. Chandrababu Naidu; Y. S. Jagan Mohan Reddy
- Constituency: Elected By MLAs

12th President of the Bharatiya Janata Party, Andhra Pradesh
- In office 27 July 2020 – 4 July 2023
- National President: Amit Shah; J. P. Nadda
- Preceded by: Kanna Lakshminarayana
- Succeeded by: Daggubati Purandeswari

Personal details
- Born: 15 October 1957 (age 68) Rajamahendravaram, Andhra Pradesh, India
- Party: Bharatiya Janata Party

Somu Veerraju (born 15 October 1957) is a senior politician from the Indian state of Andhra Pradesh from Bharatiya Janata Party and is formerly the President of BJP party for the state of Andhra Pradesh. He is an MLC of Bharatiya Janata Party in Andhra Pradesh Legislative Council. He hails from farmer's family living in Rajamahendravaram City. Veeraju was President and secretary of Bharatiya Janata Yuva Morcha in the state. He was also general secretary and vice-president of state unit and the current BJP Floor leader in Legislative Council.

== Biography ==
=== Early life ===
Somu Veerraju was born on 15 Oct. 1957 in Rajahmundry. He was born to Somu Surya Rao and Gangamma.

=== Politics ===
Somu Veerraju is currently the NATIONAL EXECUTIVE MEMBER OF BJP and former state President of BJP Andhra Pradesh. He worked as General Secretary and Vice President for BJP in Andhra Pradesh. VeerRaju was President and secretary of Bhartiya Janata Yuva Morcha in the state. He was also general secretary and vice-president of the state unit.

In 2015, he was selected by TDP as a Member of the Legislative Council. He is the Floor Leader for BJP in the Legislative Council Andhra Pradesh. He was re-elected in 2025 as a BJP candidate.

- 1980: BJYM General Secretary East Godavari District.
- 1987: BJP General Secretary East Godavari District.
- 1990: BJYM General Secretary.
- 1993-1994: BJYM AP President.
- 2003: BJP Andhra Pradesh State Executive.
- 2004: BJP Andhra Pradesh Vice-President.
- 2004: BJP MLA Candidate for Kadiam Assembly Constituency, East Godavari District
- 2006-2013: General Secretary BJP Andhra Pradesh.
- 2009: BJP Lok Sabha Candidate for Kakinada Parliament Constituency, East Godavari District
- 2013-2018: BJP National Executive.
- 2015: BJP, MEMBER OF LEGISLATIVE COUNCIL Andhra Pradesh.
- 2020: BJP Andhra Pradesh President.
- 2023: BJP National Executive Member.
- 2025: BJP, MEMBER OF LEGISLATIVE COUNCIL Andhra Pradesh.

== Personal life ==
Somu Veeraju is the youngest of his siblings with elder brother and sister.
