= K. Punnaiah =

Indian politician and judge

Kothapalli Punnaiah
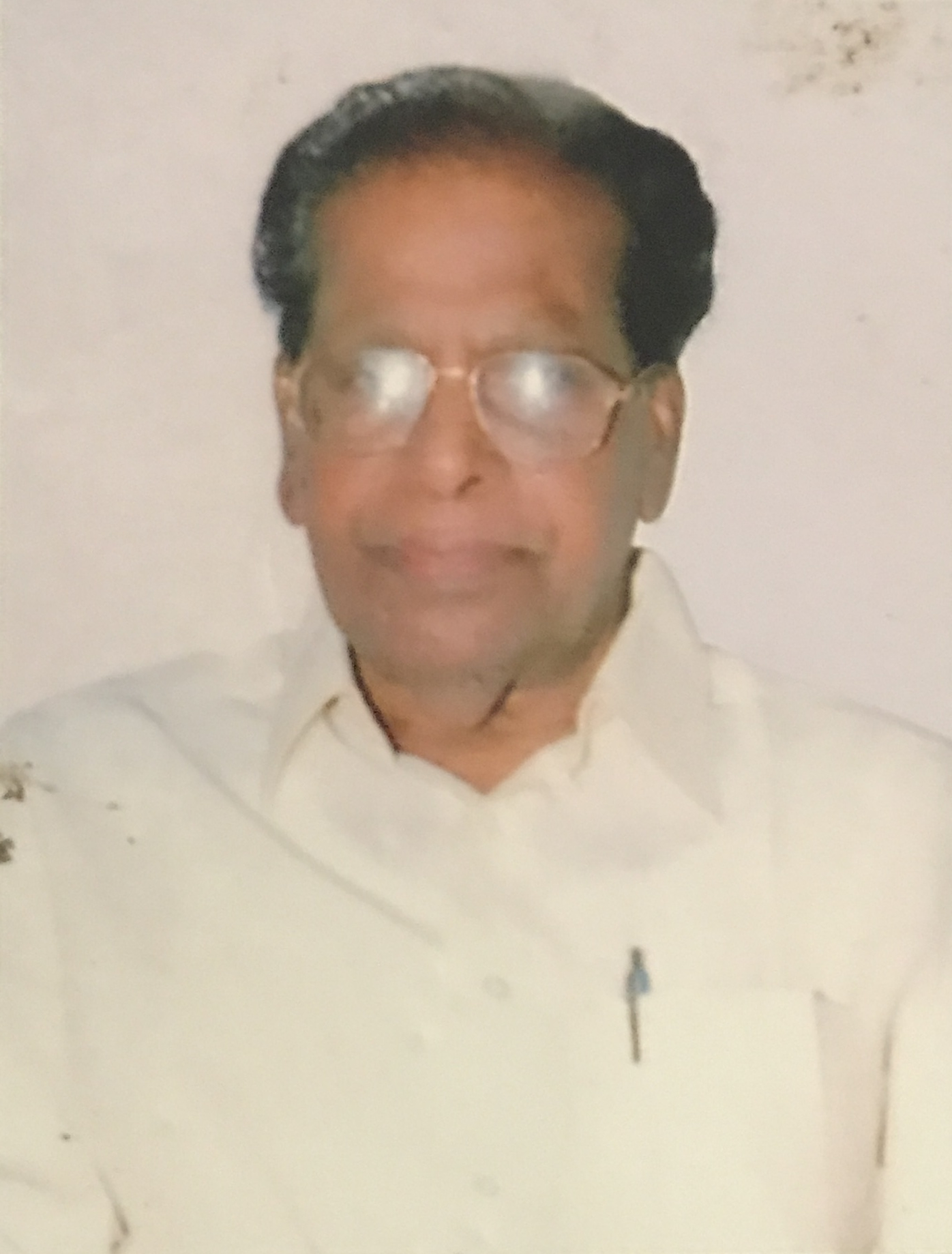

Member of Legislative Assembly
- In office 1955 - 1961
- Constituency: Cheepurupalli

Personal details
- Born: 1924 Andhra Pradesh
- Died: 1 December 2018 (aged 94) Visakhapatnam
- Party: Indian National Congress(1955-1961)
- Children: K. Pratibha Bharati
- As of December, 2018

Kothapalli Punnaiah (1924 – 1 December 2018) was an Indian politician and latterly high court judge.

== Biography ==
He served as a judge of the Andhra Pradesh High Court from 1974 - 1985. He was one of the 11 member Constitution Review Committee proposed by NDA government in 2000. He also served as the chairman of state SC/ST Commission.

== Background ==
He was born in 1924. After a brief stint as a lawyer in Srikakulam district court during 1952–53, Punnaiah took to politics and was first elected to the state assembly in 1955 from the Cheepurupally constituency in Srikakulam district. He also served as vice-president of the Srikakulam Zilla Parishad in 1958 and was elected to the assembly unopposed in 1962. After having a political career he took to judicial career and was elevated to the level of Judge of High Court.

His politician daughter, K. Pratibha Bharati, was the speaker of the Andhra Pradesh assembly, the first woman speaker of the state legislature.

== Death ==
He died at the age of 95 years in 2018 at Visakhapatnam.
