= List of constituencies of the Karnataka Legislative Council =

Karnataka Legislative Council is the upper house of the bicameral legislature of Karnataka, India. The Karnataka Legislative Council is a permanent body comprising 75 members.

== Term ==
The Karnataka Legislative Council is a permanent body with one-third of its members retiring every two years. House strength is 75 and the term of members is 6 years (renewable).

== Constituencies and Members (75) ==
Proportion	Seats	Method of Selection
One-sixth (1/6th)	11	Nominated by the Governor on the advice of the cabinet. They were supposed to have excelled in fields like arts, science, literature, cooperative movement or social service
One-third (1/3rd)	25	Elected by the members of the Legislative Assembly by proportional representation using the Single Transferable Vote System
One-third (1/3rd)	25	Elected by the members of local self governmental bodies like corporations, municipalities and district boards.
One-twelfth (1/12th)	7	Elected by an electorate consisting of electors who have held Graduate degrees for a minimum of three years
One-twelfth (1/12th)	7	Elected by an electorate consisting of teachers of secondary schools, colleges and universities with a minimum experience of three years

Among the 75 members of the Legislative Council, 25 are elected by the Karnataka Legislative Assembly members, 25 are elected by local authorities, 7 are elected by the Graduates, 7 are elected by the Teachers and 11 members are nominated by the Governor of Karnataka. The following is the list of the current members:

=== Nominated by the Governor ===
- Members of Karnataka Legislative Council nominated by the Governor

=== Elected by MLAs ===
- Members of Karnataka Legislative Council elected by members of the Legislative Assembly

=== Elected from Local Authorities' constituencies (25) ===
#	Constituency	Geographical Area Covered	No of seats
1	Bidar Local Authorities	Bidar district	1
2	Kalaburagi Local Authorities	Kalaburagi and Yadgir districts	1
3	Vijayapura Local Authorities	Vijayapura and Bagalkote districts	2
4	Belagavi Local Authorities	Belagavi district	2
5	Uttara Kannada Local Authorities	Uttara Kannada district	1
6	Dharwad Local Authorities	Dharwad, Gadag and Haveri districts	2
7	Raichur Local Authorities	Raichur and Koppal districts	1
8	Ballari Local Authorities	Bellary and Vijayanagara districts	1
9	Chitradurga Local Authorities	Chitradurga and Davanagere districts (excluding Channagiri and Honnali Taluks)	1
10	Shivamogga Local Authorities	Shivamogga and Channagiri and Honnalli taluks of Davanagere district	1
11	Dakshina Kannada Local Authorities	Dakshina Kannada and Udupi districts	1
12	Chikmagalur Local Authorities	Chikmagalur district	1
13	Hassan Local Authorities	Hassan district	1
14	Tumkuru Local Authorities	Tumakuru district	1
15	Mandya Local Authorities	Mandya district	1
16	Bangalore Urban Local Authorities	Bangalore Urban district	1
17	Bangalore Rural Local Authorities	Bangalore Rural and Ramanagara districts	1
18	Kolar Local Authorities	Kolar and Chikkaballapura districts	1
19	Kodagu Local Authorities	Kodagu district	1
20	Mysore Local Authorities	Mysore and Chamarajanagar districts	2

=== Elected from Graduates constituencies (7) ===
#	Constituency	Geographical Area Covered	No of seats
1	Karnataka North-East Graduates	Bidar, Kalaburagi, Yadgir, Bellary, Vijayanagara, Raichur and Koppal districts	1
2	Karnataka North-West Graduates	Belagavi, Vijayapura and Bagalkote districts	1
3	Karnataka West Graduates	Uttara Kannada, Dharwad, Gadag and Haveri districts	1
4	Karnataka South-East Graduates	Kolar, Chikkaballapura, Tumakuru, Chitradurga and Davanagere districts (excluding Channagiri and Honnali Taluks)	1
5	Karnataka South-West Graduates	Dakshina Kannada, Udupi, Chikmagalur, Kodagu, Shivamogga and Channagiri and Honnalli taluks of Davanagere district	1
6	Karnataka South Graduates	Mysore, Chamarajanagar, Mandya and Hassan districts	1
7	Bangalore Graduates	Bangalore Urban, Bangalore Rural and Ramanagara districts	1

=== Elected from Teachers' constituencies (7) ===
#	Constituency	Geographical Area Covered	No of seats
1	Karnataka North-East Teachers	Bidar, Kalaburagi, Yadgir, Bellary, Vijayanagara, Raichur and Koppal districts	1
2	Karnataka North-West Teachers	Belagavi, Vijayapura and Bagalkote districts	1
3	Karnataka West Teachers	Uttara Kannada, Dharwad, Gadag and Haveri districts	1
4	Karnataka South-East Teachers	Kolar, Chikkaballapura, Tumakuru, Chitradurga and Davanagere districts (excluding Channagiri and Honnali Taluks)	1
5	Karnataka South-West Teachers	Dakshina Kannada, Udupi, Chikmagalur, Kodagu, Shivamogga and Channagiri and Honnalli taluks of Davanagere district	1
6	Karnataka South Teachers	Mysore, Chamarajanagar, Mandya and Hassan districts	1
7	Bangalore Teachers	Bangalore Urban, Bangalore Rural and Ramanagara districts	1

== See also ==
- Karnataka Legislative Council
- List of chief ministers of Karnataka
- List of governors of Karnataka
- List of chairmen of the Karnataka Legislative Council
