= Mohammed Ahmed Shariff =

Indian politician

Adviser (Minority Affairs), Government of Andhra Pradesh
- Incumbent
- Assumed office November 2024

Chairperson of Andhra Pradesh Legislative Council
- In office 7 February 2019 – 31 May 2021
- Preceded by: N. Md. Farooq, TDP
- Succeeded by: Koyye Moshenu Raju, YSRCP

Member of Andhra Pradesh Legislative Council
- In office 31 May 2015 – 31 May 2021

Personal details
- Born: 1954 or 1955 (age 71–72)
- Citizenship: Indian
- Education: Sri Y N College (B. Comm); Bhopal University (M. Comm 1978, LLB 1978)
- Occupation: Business

Mohammed Ahmed Shariff is an Indian politician and the Adviser for Minority Affairs in the Government of Andhra Pradesh, since November 2024. A member of the Telugu Desam Party, he was the chairman of the Andhra Pradesh Legislative Council from 7 February 2019 to 31 May 2021.

== Early life ==
Shariff was born to Mohammed Khasim Sharif and hails from Narasapuram in West Godavari district in Andhra Pradesh. He completed his graduation with a Bachelor of Commerce degree from Sri Y N College at Narasapuram. He did Master of Commerce in 1978 and LLB in 1979 from Bhopal University.

== Political career ==
Shariff was a part of the Telugu Desam Party since its inception by N. T. Rama Rao in 1982. He held various positions in the party including national general secretary. Sharif was appointed as a Member of Legislative Council and later as the government whip in the Council.

On 7 February 2019, Shariff was elected as the Chairman of Andhra Pradesh Legislative Council. His tenure ended on 31 May 2021.

In November 2024, Shariff was appointed as the Adviser for Minority Affairs in Government of Andhra Pradesh.
