= M. V. Ramachandra Reddy =

Indian politician

M.V. Ramachandra Reddy

Member of Legislative Council Andhra Pradesh
- In office 2023–2028
- Succeeded by: Onteru Srinivasula Reddy
- Constituency: Kadapa - Ananthapur- Kurnool Districts

Personal details
- Born: M.V. Ramachandra Reddy; 1966 (age 59–60)
- Party: Yuvajana Sramika Rythu Congress Party
- Occupation: Politician

M.V. Ramachandra Reddy is an Indian politician. He is from Andhra Pradesh and a member of Yuvajana Raithu Congress Party. He got elected as a Member of the Legislative Council of the YSR Congress Party in Kadapa-Ananthapur-Kurnool districts of Andhra Pradesh by teachers MLC constituencies with a majority of 169 votes.
