= Isaac Basha =

Indian politician

Member of the Andhra Pradesh Legislative Council
- In office 2021–2027

Personal details
- Born: 4 June 1962 (age 63)
- Party: YSR Congress Party
- Parent: Jaffer

Isaac Basha (born 4 June 1962) is an Indian politician who is member of the Andhra Pradesh Legislative Council constituency Nandyal representing YSR Congress Party
