= Lella Appi Reddy =

Indian politician

Member of the Andhra Pradesh Legislative Council
- In office 2023–2029

Personal details
- Born: 25 June 1967 (age 58)
- Party: YSR Congress Party
- Parent(s): Lella Sambi Reddy,Kanthamma

Lella Appi Reddy (born 4 June 1967) is an Indian politician who is member of the Andhra Pradesh Legislative Council through nomination by Governor representing YSR Congress Party
