= Alapati Rajendra Prasad =

Indian politician

Member of Legislative Council, Andhra Pradesh
- Incumbent
- Assumed office 30 March 2025
- Preceded by: K. S. Lakshmana Rao
- Constituency: Krishna–Guntur Graduates

Minister for State of Technical Education and Industrial Training Institutions Government of Andhra Pradesh
- In office 22 October 1999 – 26 November 2001
- Governor: C. Rangarajan
- Chief Minister: N. Chandrababu Naidu

Member of Legislative Assembly, Andhra Pradesh
- In office 2014–2019
- Preceded by: Nadendla Manohar
- Succeeded by: Annabathuni Siva Kumar
- Constituency: Tenali
- In office 1994–2004
- Preceded by: Alapati Dharma Rao
- Succeeded by: Satishpaul Raj
- Constituency: Vemuru

Personal details
- Party: Telugu Desam Party

Alapati Rajendra Prasad is an Indian politician from the state of Andhra Pradesh. He is the incumbent Member of the Legislative Council of Andhra Pradesh from the Krishna–Guntur Graduates constituency. He is the former minister in the Second N. Chandrababu Naidu ministry and also served as the Member of the Legislative Assembly from Vemuru Assembly constituency and Tenali Assembly constituency.
