= Ashok Babu =

Indian politician (born 1959)

Parchuri Ashok Babu

Member of Andhra Pradesh Legislative Council
- Incumbent
- Assumed office 30 March 2019
- Constituency: MLA's

Personal details
- Born: 24 April 1959 (age 67) Vijayawada
- Party: Telugu Desam Party
- Spouse: Madhavi

Paruchuri Ashok Babu is the former President of the APNGO (Andhra Pradesh non-gazetted officers') association, and is at the forefront of the agitation for Samaikyandhra (United Andhra Pradesh).

Ashok Babu Team won the APNGO elections on 5 January 2014 with sweeping majority. In 2019 February, Elected as MLC from TDP Party.
