= Kavali Greeshma =

Indian politician

Member of Legislative Council Andhra Pradesh
- Incumbent
- Assumed office 30 March 2025
- Preceded by: Janga Krishna Murthy
- Constituency: Elected by MLA's

Chairperson Andhra Pradesh Women's Cooperative Finance Corporation
- In office 22 November 2024 – 18 March 2025

Personal details
- Party: Telugu Desam Party (2017–present)
- Spouse: Srinivas (m.2022)
- Children: 2 Sons
- Parent: K. Prathibha Bharathi (Mother)
- Occupation: Politician

Kavali Greeshma Prasad is an Indian politician from Andhra Pradesh. She has been unanimously elected to the Andhra Pradesh Legislative Council in 2025 under MLA quota, representing the Telugu Desam Party. She is the daughter of former Speaker of the Legislative Assembly Kavali Prathibha Bharathi.

Greesham is currently serving as AP Women's Cooperative Finance Corporation Chairperson from November 2024.
