= Perabathula Rajasekharam =

Politician from Andhra Pradesh

Member of Legislative Council Andhra Pradesh
- Incumbent
- Assumed office 30 March 2025
- Preceded by: I. Venkateswara Rao
- Constituency: East Godavari-West Godavari Graduates Constituency

Personal details
- Born: Kakinada, Andhra Pradesh, India
- Party: Telugu Desam Party
- Profession: Politician

Perabathula Rajasekharam (born 1972) is an Indian politician who is member of the Andhra Pradesh Legislative Council from East and West Godavari Graduates Constituency representing Telugu Desam Party.

== Political career ==
Rajasekharam started his political career by joining in Telugu Desam in 1998 and was elected as Mandal Praja Parishad president in 2006 and as a ZPTC in 2014. He aspired for the TDP ticket from Kakinada Rural constituency in the 2024 Assembly Elections, but the seat went to TDP’s alliance partner Jana Sena.

Perabathula Rajasekhar was named as Telugu Desam Party’s candidate for East and West Godavari districts Graduates’ constituency in November 2024. Elections were held on 27 February 2025 and the votes were counted on 5 March 2025 where he defeated his nearest rival PDF candidate DV Raghavulu with a majority of 77,460 votes. Rajasekhar secured 1,12,331 votes, DV Raghavulu with 47,241 votes.
