= B.Tech Ravi =

Indian politician

Mareddy Ravindranath Reddy, popularly known as B.Tech Ravi (born 1 June 1969) is an Indian politician from Andhra Pradesh. He is a former member of the Andhra Pradesh Legislative Assembly from the Pulivendla Assembly constituency, representing the Telugu Desam Party.

== Early life ==
Ravi is from Kasunuru village, Simhadri mandal, Kadapa district, Andhra Pradesh. He is the son of Krishna Reddy Mereddy. He completed his Bachlor of Technology at Basaveshwar Engineering College, Bagalkot, which is affiliated with Karnataka University in 1992. He declared assets worth Rs.1 crore in his affidavit to the Election Commission of India.

== Career ==
Ravi was elected as a Member of the Legislative Council from Kadapa and served from March 2017 to March 2023. In July 2020, he threatened to resign opposing the passing of the three capitals and CRDA bills. He also served the TDP as a central committee member.
