= Bhumireddy Rama Gopal Reddy =

Indian politician

Member of the Andhra Pradesh Legislative Council
- In office 2023–2029

Personal details
- Born: 14 August 1969 (age 56)
- Political party: Telugu Desam Party
- Parent(s): B. Veera Reddy,Lakshmi Devi

Bhumireddy Rama Gopal Reddy (born 4 June 1972) is an Indian politician who is member of the Andhra Pradesh Legislative Council constituency Anantapur,Kadapa,Kurnool representing Telugu Desam Party
