= Borra Gopi Murthy =

Politician from Andhra Pradesh

Member of Legislative Council Andhra Pradesh
- Incumbent
- Assumed office 9 December 2024
- Preceded by: Shaik Sabji
- Constituency: East Godavari-West Godavari Teachers Constituency

Personal details
- Born: Bhimavaram, West Godavari district, Andhra Pradesh, India
- Party: People's Democratic Front

Borra Gopi Murthy is an Indian politician from Andhra Pradesh.

== Career ==
He was elected to the Andhra Pradesh Legislative Council from East and West Godavari Teachers’ MLC elections held in November 2024.

Gopi Murthy secured 9,165 votes, winning with a clear majority of first-preference votes. His nearest rival Gandham Narayan Rao received 5,259 votes.
