= Vepada Chiranjeevi Rao =

Indian politician

Member of the Andhra Pradesh Legislative Council
- In office 2023–2029

Personal details
- Born: 30 August 1972 (age 53)
- Political party: Telugu Desam Party
- Parent(s): Vepada Demudu,Chilakamma

Vepada Chiranjeevi Rao or Dr.Vepada Chiranjeevi Rao (born 4 June 1972) is an Indian politician who is a member of the Andhra Pradesh Legislative Council constituency Srikakulam,Visakhapatnam,Vizianagaram representing Telugu Desam Party
