= Prakasam–Nellore–Chittoor Graduates constituency =

Graduates constituency of the Andhra Pradesh Legislative Council, India

Prakasam–Nellore–Chittoor Graduates constituency is a constituency in Prakasam district, Nellore district, Chittoor district, Tirupati district and part of Bapatla district of Andhra Pradesh that elects representatives to the Andhra Pradesh Legislative Council in India. It is one of the five council constituencies representing graduates.

== Districts ==
District
Prakasam
Nellore
Chittoor
Tirupati
Bapatla

== Members of the Legislative Council ==
Year	Member	Political party
2007	Bommireddy Ragavendra Reddy	Independent
2011	Yandlapalli Srinivasulu Reddy	Progressive Democratic Front
2017	Yandlapalli Srinivasulu Reddy	Progressive Democratic Front
2023	Kancharla Srikanth	Telugu Desam Party

== Election results ==
=== Council elections 2023 ===
2023 Council election: Prakasam-Nellore-Chittoor
Party	Candidate	FPv%	Count	
Party	Candidate	FPv%	1	2
TDP	Kancharla Srikanth	45.30		
YSRCP	Pernati Syam Prasad Reddy	34.52	8,478	8,596
PDF	Meegada Venkateswara Reddy	15.30	6,892	7,187
BJP	Sannareddy Dayakar Reddy	2.55	4,901	5,371
Electorate: 3,81,181 Valid: 2,48,360 Spoilt: 20,979 (7.78%) Quota: 8,726 Turnout: 2,69,339 (62.4%)
