= Chairperson of the Andhra Pradesh Legislative Council =

Presiding officer of the upper house of the Andhra Pradesh Legislature of India

Chairperson of Andhra Pradesh Legislative Council
- Āndhra Pradēś Śāsana Maṇḍali Chairpersonn
- Incumbent; Koyye Moshenu Raju since 19 November 2021
- Appointer: Members of the Andhra Pradesh Legislative Council
- Term length: Subject to the pleasure of the Legislative Council (Six years maximum)
- Inaugural holder: A. Chakrapani
- Formation: 30 March 2007; 19 years ago
- Deputy: Tumati Madhava Rao

The Chairperson of Andhra Pradesh Legislative Council presides over the upper house of the Andhra Pradesh Legislature. The Chairperson regulates the debates and proceedings of the House.

The office was in existence from 1958 to 1985 and again from 2007 when the Andhra Pradesh Sasana Mandali has been reconstituted.

As of 19 November 2021, the elected Chairperson of the council is Koyye Moshenu Raju.

== President of the Madras Legislative Council ==
Madras Legislative Council, the first representative legislature for the Madras Presidency was established in December 1920. The presiding officer of the council was known as the president. P. Rajagopalachari was nominated as the first president and took office on 17 December 1920.

No.	Name	Image	Assumed office	Left office
1	P. Rajagopalachari		December 1920	February 1925
2	L. D. Swamikannu Pillai		February 1925	September 1925
3	M. Ratnaswami		September 1925	1926
4	C. V. S. Narasimha Raju		1926	1930
5	B. Ramachandra Reddi		1930	1937

== Chairman of Madras Legislative Council ==
The Government of India Act 1935 enabled the introduction of provincial autonomy in 1937, and the Madras Legislative Council became the upper chamber of a bicameral legislature. The presiding officer of the council was called as the chairman of the council. This agreement continued after Indian Independence till the abolition of the council in 1986.

No.	Name	Image	Took office	Left office	Political party
1	U. Rama Rao		1937	1945	INC
2	R. B. Ramakrishna Raju		1946	1952	INC
3	P. V. Cherian		1952	On 1 October 1953, Andhra State was created without a Legislative Council. Left office on 20 April 1964 as the chair person of the residual Madras state.	INC

== List of chairpersons of Andhra Pradesh Legislative Council ==
In the first years since its creation in post-independence India, the state of Andhra Pradesh worked under a unicameral parliamentary system. On 5 December 1956, the Andhra Pradesh Vidhana Sabha passed a resolution calling for the creation of an upper house, the Vidhan Parishad, to transition to a bicameral system as it used to be earlier in the Madras state. The Vidhan Parishad was formed officially on 1 July 1958 under article 169 of the Constitution of India. The first President of India, Rajendra Prasad inaugurated the Vidhan Parishad on 8 July 1958.

#	Chair	Took office	Left office	Duration	Party	Chief Minister
1	Madapati Hanumantha Rao	7 July 1958	30 June 1960	1 year, 359 days	Indian National Congress	Neelam Sanjiva Reddy; Damodaram Sanjivayya
1	Madapati Hanumantha Rao	11 July 1960	20 July 1964	4 years, 9 days	Indian National Congress	Damodaram Sanjivayya; Neelam Sanjiva Reddy; Kasu Brahmananda Reddy
2	Gottipati Brahmaiah	25 July 1964	30 June 1968	3 years, 341 days	Indian National Congress	Kasu Brahmananda Reddy
3	Pidathala Ranga Reddy	15 July 1968	13 March 1972	3 years, 242 days	Indian National Congress	Kasu Brahmananda Reddy; P. V. Narasimha Rao
4	Thota Rama Swamy	25 March 1972	30 June 1974	2 years, 97 days	Indian National Congress	P. V. Narasimha Rao; President's rule; Jalagam Vengala Rao
5	Nivarthi Venkata Subbaiah	2 July 1974	28 March 1978	3 years, 269 days	Indian National Congress	Jalagam Vengala Rao; Marri Chenna Reddy
6	Syed Mukhasir Shah	26 March 1979	30 June 1980	1 year, 96 days	Indian National Congress	Marri Chenna Reddy
6	Syed Mukhasir Shah	23 February 1981	31 May 1985	4 years, 97 days	Indian National Congress	T. Anjaiah; Bhavanam Venkatarami Reddy; Kotla Vijaya Bhaskara Reddy; N. T. Rama Rao; Nadendla Bhaskara Rao; N. T. Rama Rao
Legislative Council abolished during the period (31 May 1985 – 29 March 2007) – 21 years, 302 days
7	Dr. Appanaboyina Chakrapani	1 April 2007	27 May 2017	10 years, 56 days	Indian National Congress	Y. S. Rajasekhara Reddy; Konijeti Rosaiah; Kiran Kumar Reddy; President's rule; N. Chandrababu Naidu
8	N. Md. Farooq	15 November 2017	10 November 2018	360 days	Telugu Desam Party	N. Chandrababu Naidu
9	Mohammed Ahmed Shariff	7 February 2019	31 May 2021	2 years, 113 days	Telugu Desam Party	N. Chandrababu Naidu; Y. S. Jagan Mohan Reddy
10	Koyye Moshenu Raju	19 November 2021	Incumbent	4 years, 292 days	YSR Congress Party	Y. S. Jagan Mohan Reddy; N. Chandrababu Naidu

== List of deputy chairpersons of Andhra Pradesh Legislative Council ==
#	Deputy Chair	Took office	Left office	Duration	Party
1	Dr. Gokaraju Subba Raju	8 July 1958	30 June 1964	5 years, 358 days	Indian National Congress
2	Mamidipudi Anandam	17 July 1964	30 March 1966	1 year, 256 days	Indian National Congress
3	Erram Sathyanarayana	11 September 1969	30 June 1970	292 days	Indian National Congress
4	Syed Mukhasir Shah	17 December 1970	30 June 1974	3 years, 195 days	Indian National Congress
4	Syed Mukhasir Shah	4 July 1974	24 March 1979	4 years, 263 days	Indian National Congress
5	Kancherla Keshava Rao	26 March 1980	24 February 1981	335 days	Indian National Congress
6	Thota Panchajanyam	8 September 1982	8 August 1983	334 days	Indian National Congress
7	Dr. Appanaboyina Chakrapani	19 September 1983	31 May 1985	1 year, 254 days	Indian National Congress
Legislative Council abolished during the period (31 May 1985 – 29 March 2007) – 21 years, 302 days
8	Mohammad Jani	24 July 2007	29 March 2011	3 years, 248 days	Indian National Congress
9	Nethi Vidyasagar	4 June 2011	1 June 2014	2 years, 362 days	Indian National Congress
10	Singareddy Venkata Satish Kumar Reddy	4 September 2014	29 March 2017	2 years, 206 days	Telugu Desam Party
11	Reddy Subrahmanyam	31 March 2017	18 June 2021	4 years, 79 days	Telugu Desam Party
12	Mayana Zakia Khanam	26 November 2021	27 July 2026	4 years, 243 days	YSR Congress Party
13	Tumati Madhava Rao	19 August 2026	Incumbent	19 days	YSR Congress Party
