= Ananta Babu =

Politician from Andhra Pradesh

Member of Andhra Pradesh Legislative Council from Kakinada
- Incumbent
- In office 2021–2027
- Constituency: Local Authorities

Personal details
- Born: Ananta Satya Udaya Bhaskar; Age 46
- Party: YSR Congress Party (2021-)

Ananta Satya Udaya Bhaskar, popularly known as Ananta Babu, is a Member of the Legislative Council (MLC) in the state of Andhra Pradesh, India. He belongs to the YSR Congress Party and represents the Local Authorities constituency of East Godavari district. In May 2022, he admitted to committing the crime of murdering his driver, Veedhi Subramanyam, and door delivered his dead body to his home, who was reportedly a Dalit.

== Early life ==
Ananta Babu's father, Ananta Chakra Rao, was the former president of the Addatigala Samiti. In 1986, he was shot by the People's War Naxals.

== Criminal activities ==
According to reports, Ananta Babu has been linked to the supply of valuable color stones discovered in the agency, and his involvement in this illicit trade has led to the opening of a rowdy-sheet against him. While he has been embroiled in various criminal activities in the past, including serving jail time in Vizag for assaulting the former Araku MP Kottapalli Geeta, there have been no prior reports of him being involved in murder. Furthermore, there have been allegations of Ananta Babu's inappropriate behavior towards women in the agency, which adds to the complexity of his criminal history. Despite being a repeat offender, Ananta Babu managed to get his rowdy-sheet taken down three years ago.

== Controversial political career ==
Ananta Babu has a history of criminal activities and is believed to have won the Rampachodavaram constituency by telling tribesmen who to vote for. In 2014, he nominated himself as an independent candidate for the 2014 elections to become an MLA. As part of his nomination, he submitted a community certificate claiming that he belonged to the Konda Kapu Community, which is recognized as a Scheduled Tribe. However, the 6th respondent, who was the returned candidate, objected to his nomination, alleging that Ananta Babu actually belonged to the forward caste Kapu community and not the Scheduled Tribe. The Returning Officer reviewed the objection and ultimately rejected Ananta Babu's nomination, concluding that he did not actually belong to the Scheduled Tribe as he had claimed. Instead, Vanthala Rajeswari was nominated as a dummy and later became an MLA, with rumors that Ananta Babu was signing her letterhead. However, Rajeshwari unexpectedly joined the TDP, leaving Ananta Babu in an awkward position. In 2021, he was elected as a Member of the Legislative Council unanimously from local bodies by YSR Congress Party.

== Subrahmanyam's murder ==
As per the account provided by Subrahmanyam's family, he received a call from MLC Ananta Babu on Thursday night at approximately 9:30 pm. However, in the early hours of Friday, 20 May, around 2 am, the MLC returned Subrahmanyam's dead body to his family, claiming that he had died in an accident. Despite Ananta Babu's assertion, Subrahmanyam's family has raised allegations of foul play and suspects that he was murdered. In fact, the family revealed that Subrahmanyam had resigned from his position as the MLC's driver five months ago.

According to Superintendent of Police Ravindranath Babu, on the night of 19 May 2020 the MLC asked Subrahmanyam to meet him, and when he arrived in the Sankar Nagar cell tower area, there was a disagreement between the MLC and driver Subrahmanyam near Ananta Babu's apartment complex regarding a payment of ₹ 20,000 that the legislator was owed. The argument turned physical when Ananta Babu struck and pushed Subrahmanyam, causing him to fall on an iron grill and sustain a head injury. Eventually, Subrahmanyam died due to his injuries and Ananta Babu tried to disguise the murder as an accident by attempting to admit him to the hospital. However, Ananta Babu discovered that Subrahmanyam had already died, so he pushed him out of his car to make it appear as though the death was due to an accident.

It has been alleged that Subrahmanyam was aware of the MLC's secrets, companies, and other activities, and the MLC feared that his former driver might reveal these secrets, prompting him to kill him.

Following his arrest, Ananta Babu was brought to court, where he was sent to 14 days of judicial custody. Police subsequently transferred him to Rajahmundry Central Jail. On 16 December 2022, Ananta Babu was released on conditional bail by the Supreme Court after 6 months in jail and received as hero by supporters. Babu's release was celebrated by supporters of the YSRCP political party, who gave him a rousing welcome upon his return.
