= List of Indian state budgets =

This is a list of Indian state budgets as enacted by the state legislatures for the upcoming fiscal year.

Expenditure
State	Budget (in crore rupees)	FY	Reference
Andhra Pradesh	₹332,205 crore (US$35 billion)	2026-27	
Arunachal Pradesh	₹36,607 crore (US$3.8 billion)	2026-27	
Assam	₹155,985 crore (US$16 billion)	2025–26	
Bihar	₹347,589 crore (US$36 billion)	2026-27	
Chhattisgarh	₹172,000 crore (US$18 billion)	2026-27	
Delhi	₹100,000 crore (US$10 billion)	2025-26	
Goa	₹30,195 crore (US$3.1 billion)	2026-27	
Gujarat	₹408,053 crore (US$43 billion)	2026-27	
Haryana	₹223,658 crore (US$23 billion)	2026-27	
Himachal Pradesh	₹54,928 crore (US$5.7 billion)	2026-27	
Jammu and Kashmir	₹127,767 crore (US$13 billion)	2026-27	
Jharkhand	₹150,106 crore (US$16 billion)	2026-27	
Karnataka	₹448,004 crore (US$47 billion)	2026-27	
Kerala	₹313,543 crore (US$33 billion)	2025-26	
Madhya Pradesh	₹438,317 crore (US$46 billion)	2026-27	
Maharashtra	₹769,467 crore (US$80 billion)	2026–27	
Manipur	₹32,339 crore (US$3.4 billion)	2026-27	
Meghalaya	₹32,023 crore (US$3.3 billion)	2026-27	
Mizoram	₹17,469 crore (US$1.8 billion)	2026-27	
Nagaland	₹24,699 crore (US$2.6 billion)	2025-26	
Odisha	₹310,000 crore (US$32 billion)	2026-27	
Punjab	₹260,437 crore (US$27 billion)	2026-27	
Rajasthan	₹610,956 crore (US$64 billion)	2026-27	
Sikkim	₹16,196 crore (US$1.7 billion)	2025-26	
Tamil Nadu	₹486,332 crore (US$51 billion)	2025-26	
Telangana	₹324,324 crore (US$34 billion)	2026-27	
Tripura	₹34,212 crore (US$3.6 billion)	2026-27	
Uttarakhand	₹111,703 crore (US$12 billion)	2026-27	
Uttar Pradesh	₹912,696 crore (US$95 billion)	2026–27	
West Bengal	₹406,000 crore (US$42 billion)	2026–27	
