= Zakia Khanam =

Indian politician (born 1971)

Deputy Chairperson of Andhra Pradesh Legislative Council
- In office 26 November 2021 – 27 July 2026
- Preceded by: Reddy Subrahmanyam
- Succeeded by: Tumati Madhava Rao

Member of Legislative Council Andhra Pradesh
- In office 28 July 2020 – 27 July 2026
- Constituency: Nominated by Governor

Personal details
- Born: 1 January 1971 (age 55) Rayachoti, Andhra Pradesh, India
- Party: Bharatiya Janata Party
- Other political affiliations: YSR Congress Party
- Spouse: Mayana Afzal Ali Khan

Mayana Zakia Khanam (born 1 January 1971) is an Indian politician from Andhra Pradesh. She was nominated to the Andhra Pradesh Legislative Council in 2020. She is the current deputy chairman of Andhra Pradesh Legislative Council. She is a member of the Bharatiya Janata Party.

== Political career ==
In July 2020, Khanam was elected to the APLC from the Annamayya constituency by Governor Biswabhusan Harichandan. She was elected deputy speaker of the Andhra Pradesh Legislative Council on 26 November 2021, becoming the first woman to do so.

Zakia Khanam resigned to her MLC post and YSRCP primary membership on 14 May 2025 and joined Bharatiya Janata Party in the presence of BJP party President & Rajahmundry MP Daggubati Purandeswari and Health Minister Satya Kumar Yadav in Vijayawada.

== Personal life ==
Khanam is married to Mayana Afzal Ali Khan and they have four children together.
