= Koyye Moshenu Raju =

Indian politician

Chairperson of Andhra Pradesh Legislative Council
- Incumbent
- Assumed office 19 November 2021
- Governor: Biswabhusan Harichandan; Syed Abdul Nazeer
- Leader of the House: Y. S. Jagan Mohan Reddy; N. Chandrababu Naidu
- Deputy: Zakia Khanam; Tumati Madhava Rao
- Preceded by: Shariff Mohammed Ahmed

Member of Legislative Council Andhra Pradesh
- Incumbent
- Assumed office 16 June 2021
- Constituency: Nominated by Governor

Personal details
- Born: 10 April 1965 (age 61): Gunupudi, Bhimavaram, Andhra Pradesh, India
- Party: YSR Congress Party
- Other political affiliations: Telugu Desam Party; Indian National Congress
- Spouse: Koyye Annamani
- Children: 3 (1 daughter & 2 sons) Koyye Sundara Raju; Koyye Chitti Raju
- Parents: Koyye Sundara Rao (father); Koyye Mariamma (mother)

Koyye Moshenu Raju (born 10 April 1965) is an Indian politician and Member of Andhra Pradesh Legislative Council who is serving as 10th Chairperson of Andhra Pradesh Legislative Council since 2022. He was nominated for the post by YSR Congress Party.
