= A. Chakrapani =

Indian politician

Appanaboyina Chakrapani is an Indian politician from Indian National Congress who served as Chairman of Andhra Pradesh Legislative Council.

== Personal life ==
He was born on 1 January 1943 and died on 4 November 2026. He belongs to a backward class community. In 2015, Konijeti Rosaiah released a biography on him which was written by his daughter.
