= Gade Srinivasulu Naidu =

Indian politician (born 1969)

Member of the Andhra Pradesh Legislative Council
- Incumbent
- Assumed office 30 March 2025
- Preceded by: Pakalapati Raghu Varma
- Succeeded by: Pakalapati Raghu Varma
- In office 30 March 2013 – 29 March 2019
- Succeeded by: Pakalapati Raghu Varma
- Constituency: Srikakulam - Vizianagaram - Visakhapatnam Teachers Constituency

Personal details
- Born: 1969 (age 56–57)
- Party: PRTU
- Occupation: Politician

Gade Srinivasulu Naidu is an Indian politician from Andhrapradesh. He was elected as a member in the Andhra Pradesh Legislative Council from Srikakulam - Vizianagaram - Visakhapatnam Teachers Constituency on 3 March 2025.

== Political career ==
Gade Srinivasulu Naidu contested as MLC from Progressive Recognised Teachers' Union (PRTU) candidate from Srikakulam - Vizianagaram - Visakhapatnam Teachers Constituency in 2007, 2013 and lost the election in 2019 to Pakalapati Raghu Varma of APTF (Andhra Pradesh Teachers’ Federation). He again contested in 2025 MLC Elections from Srikakulam - Vizianagaram - Visakhapatnam Teachers Constituency as Progressive Recognised Teachers' Union (PRTU) candidate and won as MLC by defeating his nearest rival APTF candidate Pakalapati Raghu Varma with a margin of 12,035 first preference votes.
