= Kancharla Srikanth =

Indian politician

- కంచర్ల శ్రీకాంత్
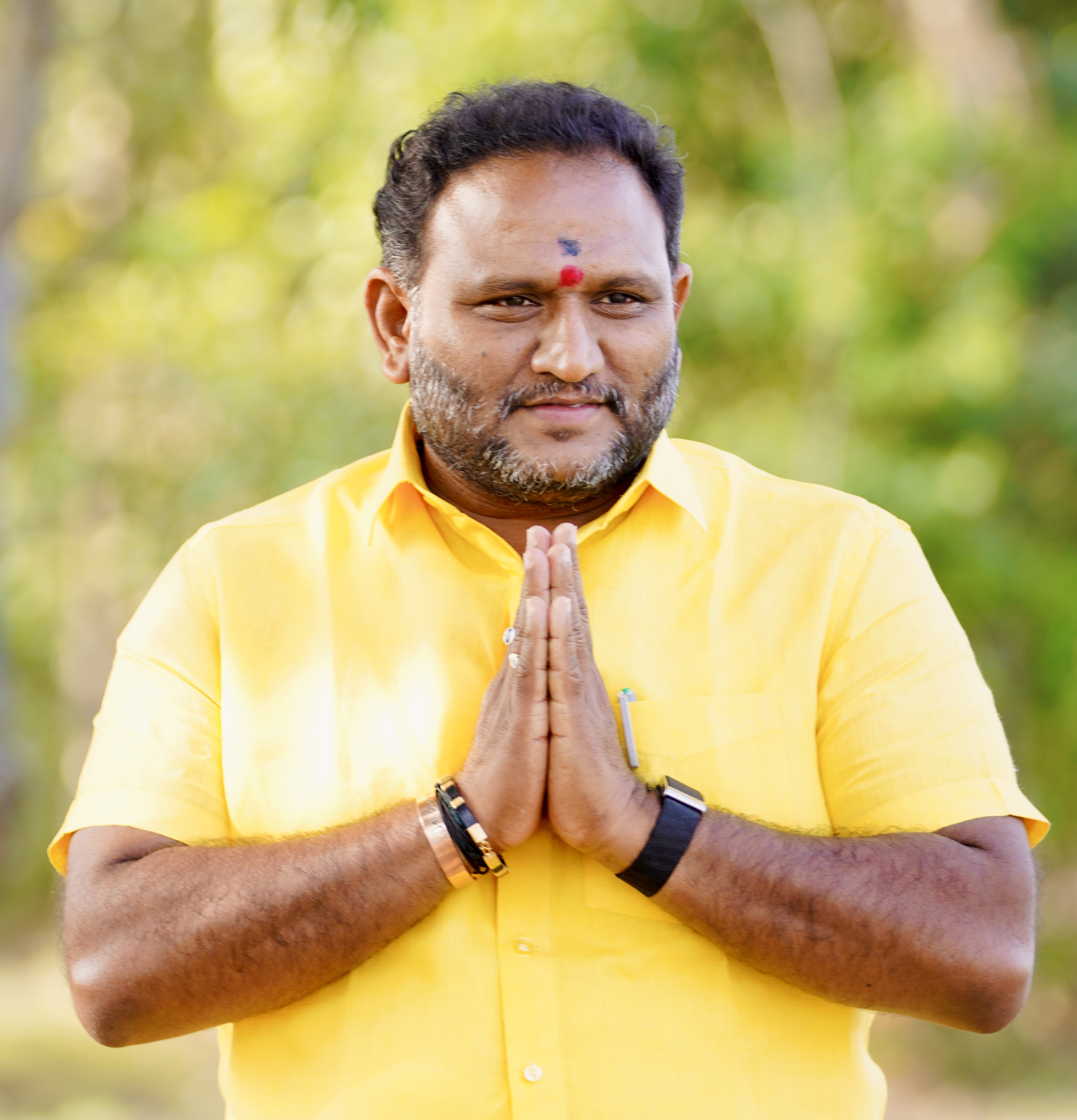

Member of the Andhra Pradesh Legislative Council
- In office 30 March 2023 – 2029
- Constituency: Prakasam–Nellore–Chittoor Graduates constituency

Government Whip, Andhra Pradesh Legislative Council

Political Chairman, Kuppam Area Development Authority (KADA)

Organising Secretary, Telugu Desam Party

Personal details
- Born: 29 April 1981 Kandukur, Prakasam district, Andhra Pradesh, India
- Party: Telugu Desam Party
- Spouse: Saritha
- Children: Two sons
- Parent(s): K. Ramaiah (Eenadu Ramaiah), Dhanalakshmi
- Occupation: Politician

Kancharla Srikanth is an Indian politician from Andhra Pradesh representing the Telugu Desam Party (TDP). He is serving as a Member of the Andhra Pradesh Legislative Council (MLC) from the East Rayalaseema Graduates' Constituency, comprising Prakasam, Nellore and Chittoor districts.

He serves as the Government Whip in the Andhra Pradesh Legislative Council and is also the Political Chairman of the Kuppam Area Development Authority (KADA). Within the Telugu Desam Party, he holds the position of Organising Secretary.

He also serves as the Secretary of the Kancharla Foundation and Treasurer of Amma Educational Society.

== Early life and education ==
Srikanth was born on 29 April 1981 in Kandukur, Prakasam district, Andhra Pradesh, to K. Ramaiah, popularly known as "Eenadu Ramaiah", and Dhanalakshmi.

He completed his B.Tech degree from Sri Venkateswara University, Tirupati. He later obtained an MBA degree from the Institution of Engineers (India), and Hounered with a Doctorate from the University of Asia.

== Political career ==
Srikanth entered politics through the Telugu Desam Party in 2009 and served as the Organising Secretary of the TSNV. In the 2014 local body elections, he contested as the TDP candidate from Kandukur and was elected as a ZPTC member. He received the Best ZPTC Award at the state level in 2017 and 2019.

In 2021, he was appointed as the ITDP State Spokesperson.

In 2023, he contested the Andhra Pradesh Legislative Council elections from the East Rayalaseema Graduates' Constituency as the Telugu Desam Party candidate and won by a margin of 34,108 votes.

On 12 November 2024, he was appointed as Government Whip in the Andhra Pradesh Legislative Council. And also the Political Chairman of the Kuppam Area Development Authority (KADA)
