= P. V. V. Suryanarayana Raju =

Indian politician

Member of Legislative Council Andhra Pradesh
- Incumbent
- Assumed office March 2023
- Constituency: MLA quota

Personal details
- Born: 6 July 1966 (age 59)
- Party: Yuvajana Sramika Rythu Congress Party
- Spouse: Penumatsa Roja Rani
- Parent(s): Penumatsa Sambasiva Raju and Penumatsa Venkata Ramanamma
- Occupation: Politician

Penumatsa Varaha Venkata Suryanarayana Raju (born 6 July 1966) also known as Suresh Babu, is an Indian politician from Andhra Pradesh. He is son of Penumatsa Sambasiva Raju who was a former Transport Minister and an eight-time MLA. He was elected as a Member of the Legislative Council on behalf of the YSR Congress Party by an MLA quota election.

== Personal life ==
He was born to Penumatsa Sambasiva Raju and Penumatsa Venkata Ramanamma. Later he married Penumatsa Roja Rani.
