= Krishna–Guntur Graduates constituency =

Graduates constituency of the Andhra Pradesh Legislative Council, India

Krishna–Guntur Graduates constituency is a constituency in Krishna district, NTR district, Guntur district, Palnadu district and part of Bapatla district of Andhra Pradesh that elects representatives to the Andhra Pradesh Legislative Council in India. It is one of the five council constituencies representing graduates.

== Districts ==
District
Guntur
Krishna
NTR
Eluru
Palnadu
Bapatla

== Members of the Legislative Council ==
Year	Member	Political party
2007	Chigurupati Vara Prasad	Telugu Desam Party
2013	Boddu Nageswara Rao	Independent
2019	K. S. Lakshmana Rao	Independent
2025	Alapati Rajendra Prasad	Telugu Desam Party
