= Progressive Democratic Front (Andhra Pradesh) =

Indian political party

- Abbreviation: PDF
- President: Vitapu Balasubrahmanyam
- Colours: Red
- Seats in Andhra Pradesh Legislative Council: 0 / 58

Progressive Democratic Front is a political front in the Indian state of Andhra Pradesh, with representation in the Andhra Pradesh Legislative Council. As of March 2025 it holds no seats in the council and participates in elections for graduates' and teachers' constituencies in the state.
