= Andhra Pradesh Legislative Council =

Upper house of the Andhra Pradesh Legislature

Andhra Pradesh Legislative Council Āndhra Pradēś Śāsana Maṇḍali

Type
- Type: Upper house of the Andhra Pradesh Legislature
- Term limits: 6 years

History
- Founded: 1 July 1958 – 31 May 1985; 30 March 2007 – present

Leadership
- Governor: Syed Abdul Nazeer since 24 February 2023
- Secretary General: Suryadevara Prasanna Kumar since 15 July 2024
- Chairperson: Koyye Moshenu Raju, YSRCP since 19 November 2021
- Deputy Chairperson: Tumati Madhava Rao, YSRCP since 19 August 2026
- Leader of the House (Chief Minister): N. Chandrababu Naidu, TDP since 12 June 2024
- Minister of Legislative Affairs: Payyavula Keshav, TDP since 12 June 2024
- Leader of the Opposition: Botsa Satyanarayana, YSRCP since 22 August 2024

Structure
- Seats: 58 (50 elected + 8 nominated)
- Political groups: Government (15) Kutami (15): TDP (12); JSP (2); BJP (1); Official Opposition (33) YSRCP (33) Other Opposition (5) IND (5) Vacant (5) Vacant (5)

Elections
- Voting system: Single transferable vote
- Last election: 3 March 2025

Meeting place
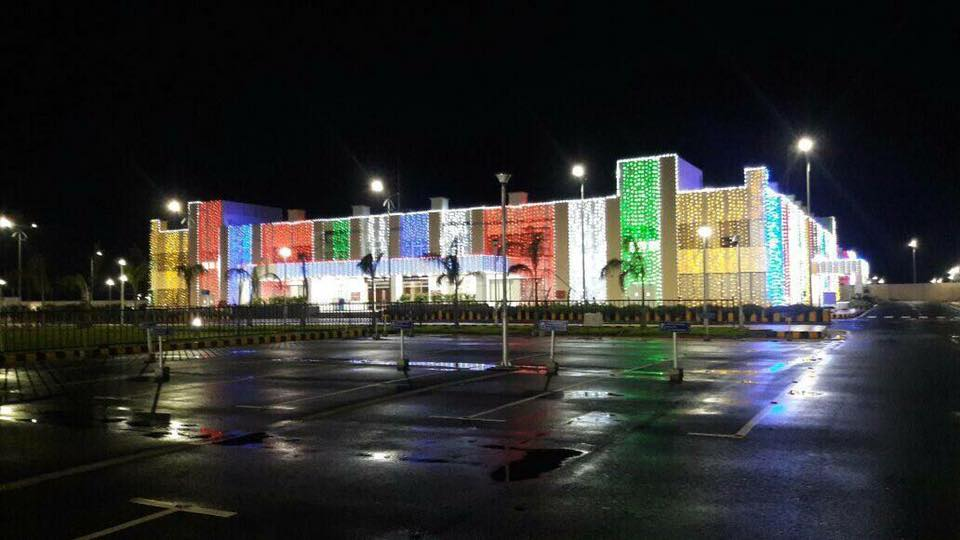
- Council Building; Amaravati, Andhra Pradesh, India

Website
- Andhra Pradesh Legislative Council

The Andhra Pradesh Legislative Council (Telugu: ఆంధ్రప్రదేశ్ శాసన మండలి, ISO: Āndhra Pradēś Śāsana Maṇḍali) is the upper house of the bicameral legislature of the Indian state, Andhra Pradesh. It is situated in the state capital of Amaravati comprising a total of 58 seats. The Sasana Mandali has been in existence in two spells: from 1958 to 1985, and from 2007 continuing till today.

== History ==
In the first years since its creation in post-independence India, the state of Andhra Pradesh worked under a unicameral parliamentary system. On 5 December 1956, the Andhra Pradesh Vidhana Sabha passed a resolution calling for the creation of an upper house, the Vidhan Parishad, to transition to a bicameral system. The members of the majority party/coalition in the lower house would be the ruling party of the upper house, regardless of number. The house will have a chairman who conducts day-to-day affairs, rather than a speaker. The Vidhan Parishad was formed officially on 1 July 1958 under article 169 of the Constitution of India. The first President of India, Rajendra Prasad inaugurated the Vidhan Parishad on 8 July 1958.

=== Abolition in 1985 ===
In the 1980s, Andhra Pradesh became one of the first states to seek the abolition of the upper houses, which were being increasingly criticised as being unnecessary, unrepresentative of the population, a burden on the state budget and causing delays in passing legislation. However, the move was criticised by the opposition's as an attempt by the then-ruling party, the Telugu Desam Party (TDP), to deny their main political opposition, the Indian National Congress (I) of influence in the state government and the control of the upper house, which could delay TDP-sponsored legislation and where the TDP held no seats. In accordance with a resolution passed by the Andhra Pradesh Vidhan Sabha, the Indian Parliament abolished the Vidhan Parishad through the Andhra Pradesh Legislative Council (Abolition) Act in 1985, after the Congress (I) suffered a major defeat in the state elections in Andhra Pradesh.

=== Revival in 2007 ===
Subsequent attempts were made to revive the Legislative Council under Chief Minister Marri Chenna Reddy, who belonged to the Congress (I), which had won the state elections in 1989. A resolution to revive the Legislative Council was passed in the Vidhan Sabha on 22 January 1990. The Rajya Sabha, the upper house of the Indian Parliament, passed legislation authorising the revival of the Legislative Council as per the resolution of the state Vidhan Sabha on 28 May 1990, but the legislation stalled in the lower house, the Lok Sabha, primarily due to its dissolution in 1991 before the completion of its five-year term. The subsequent Lok Sabhas did not take any further decision or action.

After its victory in the 2004 state elections, the Congress-led Andhra Pradesh Legislative Assembly passed another resolution on 8 July 2004 calling for the revival of the Legislative Council. This time it was introduced in the Lok Sabha as the Andhra Pradesh Council Bill on 16 December 2004. On 15 December 2005 the Lok Sabha passed the legislation, which was quickly passed by the Rajya Sabha on 20 December, and received the assent of the President on 11 January 2006. The newly revived Legislative Council was constituted on 30 March 2007 and inaugurated on 2 April by Rameshwar Thakur, the Governor of Andhra Pradesh.

=== Second abolition proposed in 2020 ===
The ruling YSR Congress Party made and passed the resolution for abolition of the Legislative Council in the Andhra Pradesh Legislative Assembly on 27 January 2020 to make way for the YSRCP-sponsored capital decentralization bill which has been stalled by the opposition TDP which had majority in the council, as the chairman decided to send the two bills pertaining to the decentralization of the capital that are the Andhra Pradesh Decentralisation and Inclusive Development of All Regions Act, 2020 and the Andhra Pradesh Capital Region Development Authority Repeal Act, 2020 to a select committee.

The resolution was later withdrawn by the ruling YSRCP as it gained a majority by then in the council making a way to pass it's sponsored bills and with no response from the Parliament of India regarding the decision to abolish the council.

== Composition ==
The chairman, elected by the council, presides over the sessions of the council. The deputy chairman is also elected to preside in the chairman's absence.

=== Presiding officers ===
Designation	Name
Governor	Syed Abdul Nazeer
Chairperson	Koyye Moshenu Raju (YSRCP)
Deputy Chairperson	Tumati Madhava Rao (YSRCP)
Leader of the House (Chief Minister)	N. Chandrababu Naidu (TDP)
Leader of the Opposition	Botsa Satyanarayana (YSRCP)

=== Members ===
Party	Members
YSR Congress Party	33
Telugu Desam Party	12
Janasena Party	2
Bharatiya Janata Party	1
Independent	5
Vacant	5
Total	58

== Members ==
=== Elected by Members of the Legislative Assembly (20) ===
Keys: YSRCP (8) TDP (5) JSP (2) BJP (1) Vacant (4)

#	Member	Party	Alliance	Term start	Term end
1	P. V. V. Suryanarayana Raju	YSRCP	None	30-Mar-2023	29-Mar-2029
2	Chandragiri Yesuratnam	YSRCP	None	30-Mar-2023	29-Mar-2029
3	Bommi Israel	YSRCP	None	30-Mar-2023	29-Mar-2029
4	Isaac Basha	YSRCP	None	29-Nov-2021	28-Nov-2027
5	Duvvada Srinivas	YSRCP	None	30-Mar-2021	29-Mar-2027
6	Devasani Chinna Govinda Reddy	YSRCP	None	29-Nov-2021	28-Nov-2027
7	Palavalasa Vikranth	YSRCP	None	29-Nov-2021	28-Nov-2027
8	Mohammed Ruhulla	YSRCP	None	21-Mar-2022	29-Mar-2027
9	Kavali Greeshma	TDP	Kutami	30-Mar-2025	29-Mar-2031
10	Beedha Ravichandra	TDP	Kutami	30-Mar-2025	29-Mar-2031
11	Bendula Thirumala Naidu	TDP	Kutami	30-Mar-2025	29-Mar-2031
12	Panchumarthi Anuradha	TDP	Kutami	30 Mar 2023	29-Mar-2029
13	Chennamsetty Ramachandraiah	TDP	Kutami	08-Jul-2024	29-Mar-2027
14	Konidela Nagendra Rao	JSP	Kutami	30-Mar-2025	29-Mar-2031
15	Pidugu Hariprasad	JSP	Kutami	08-Jul-2024	29-Mar-2027
16	Somu Veerraju	BJP	Kutami	30-Mar-2025	29-Mar-2031
17	Vacant since 19-Mar-2025				29-Mar-2029
18	Vacant since 28-Aug-2024				29-Mar-2029
19	Vacant since 23-Nov-2024				29-Mar-2029
20	Vacant since 30-Aug-2024				29-Mar-2027

=== Elected from Local Authorities constituencies (20) ===
Keys: YSRCP (20)

#	Constituency	Member	Party	Alliance	Term start	Term end
1	Chitoor	Cipai Subramanyam	YSRCP	None	02-May-2023	01-May-2029
2	East Godavari	Kudupudi Suryanarayana Rao	YSRCP	None	02-May-2023	01-May-2029
3	Kurnool	Alampur Madhusudhan	YSRCP	None	02-May-2023	01-May-2029
4	Srikakulam	Narthu Ramarao	YSRCP	None	02-May-2023	01-May-2029
5	Nellore	Meriga Muralidhar	YSRCP	None	02-May-2023	01-May-2029
6	West Godavari	Kavuru Srinivasa Rao	YSRCP	None	02-May-2023	01-May-2029
7	West Godavari	Vanka Raveendranath	YSRCP	None	02-May-2023	01-May-2029
8	Anantapur	Sanipalli Mangamma	YSRCP	None	30 Mar 2023	29-Mar-2029
9	Kadapa	P. Rama Subba Reddy	YSRCP	None	30 Mar 2023	29-Mar-2029
10	Anantapur	Yellareddygari Sivarami Reddy	YSRCP	None	2-Dec-2021	1-Dec-2027
11	Chitoor	K. R. J. Bharath	YSRCP	None	2-Dec-2021	1-Dec-2027
12	East Godavari	Ananta Satya Udaya Bhaskar	YSRCP	None	2-Dec-2021	1-Dec-2027
13	Guntur	Murugudu Hanumantha Rao	YSRCP	None	2-Dec-2021	1-Dec-2027
14	Guntur	Ummareddy Venkateswarlu	YSRCP	None	2-Dec-2021	1-Dec-2027
15	Krishna	Monditoka Arunkumar	YSRCP	None	2-Dec-2021	1-Dec-2027
16	Krishna	Talasila Raghuram	YSRCP	None	2-Dec-2021	1-Dec-2027
17	Prakasam	Tumati Madhava Rao	YSRCP	None	2-Dec-2021	1-Dec-2027
18	Visakhapatnam	Varudu Kalyani	YSRCP	None	2-Dec-2021	1-Dec-2027
19	Visakhapatnam	Botsa Satyanarayana	YSRCP	None	21-Aug-2024	1-Dec-2027
20	Vizianagaram	Indukuri Raghu Raju	YSRCP	None	02-Dec-2021	1-Dec-2027

=== Elected from Graduates constituencies (5) ===
Keys: TDP (5)

#	Constituency	Member	Party	Alliance	Term start	Term end
1	Srikakulam–Vizianagaram–Visakhapatnam	Vepada Chiranjeevi Rao	TDP	Kutami	30-Mar-2023	29-Mar-2029
2	Prakasam–Nellore–Chittoor	Kancharla Srikanth	TDP	Kutami	30-Mar-2023	29-Mar-2029
3	Kadapa–Anantapur–Kurnool	B. Rama Gopal Reddy	TDP	Kutami	30-Mar-2023	29-Mar-2029
4	East Godavari–West Godavari	Perabathula Rajasekharam	TDP	Kutami	30-Mar-2025	29-Mar-2031
5	Krishna–Guntur	Alapati Rajendra Prasad	TDP	Kutami	30-Mar-2025	29-Mar-2031

=== Elected from Teachers constituencies (5) ===
Keys: IND (5)

#	Constituency	Member	Party	Alliance	Term start	Term end
1	Prakasam–Nellore–Chittoor	P. Chandra Sekhar Reddy	IND	None	30-Mar-2023	29-Mar-2029
2	Kadapa–Anantapur–Kurnool	M. V. Rama Chandra Reddy	IND	None	30-Mar-2023	29-Mar-2029
3	East Godavari–West Godavari	Borra Gopi Murthy	IND	None	09-Dec-2024	29-Mar-2027
4	Krishna–Guntur	Tamatam Kalpalatha	IND	None	30-Mar-2021	29-Mar-2027
5	Srikakulam–Vizianagaram–Visakhapatnam	Gade Srinivasulu Naidu	IND	None	30-Mar-2025	29-Mar-2031

=== Nominated by Governor (8) ===
Keys: YSRCP (5) TDP (2) Vacant (1)

#	Member	Party	Alliance	Term start	Term end
1	Kumbha Ravibabu	YSRCP	None	10-Aug-2023	09-Aug-2029
2	Rajagolla Ramesh Yadav	YSRCP	None	16-Jun-2021	15-Jun-2027
3	Koyye Moshenu Raju	YSRCP	None	16-Jun-2021	15-Jun-2027
4	Lella Appi Reddy	YSRCP	None	16-Jun-2021	15-Jun-2027
5	Thota Trimurthulu	YSRCP	None	16-Jun-2021	15-Jun-2027
6	Varla Ramaiah	TDP	Kutami	19-Aug-2026	18-Aug-2032
7	Vadde Dalavayi Ramadevi	TDP	Kutami	19-Aug-2026	18-Aug-2032
8	Vacant since 30-Aug-2024				09-Aug-2029

== See also ==
- Elections in Andhra Pradesh
- List of chairpersons of the Andhra Pradesh Legislative Council
