= Visakhapatnam Lok Sabha constituency =

Lok Sabha Constituency in Andhra Pradesh

Coordinates: 17.8°N 83.2°E

Visakhapatnam AP-4
- Lok Sabha constituency
- Interactive Map Outlining Visakhapatnam Lok Sabha constituency

Constituency details
- Country: India
- Region: South India
- State: Andhra Pradesh
- Assembly constituencies: Srungavarapukota; Bheemili; Visakhapatnam East; Visakhapatnam South; Visakhapatnam North; Visakhapatnam West; Gajuwaka
- Established: 1952
- Total electors: 19,27,303
- Reservation: None

Member of Parliament
- 18th Lok Sabha
- Incumbent Mathukumilli Bharat
- Party: TDP
- Alliance: NDA
- Elected year: 2024
- Preceded by: M. V. V. Satyanarayana

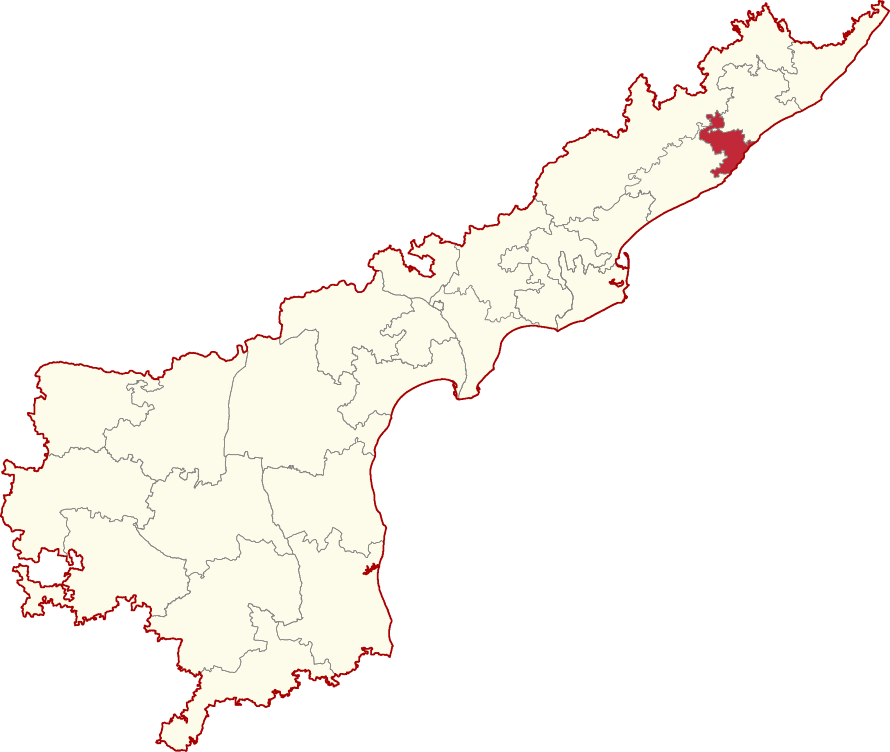
Location of Visakhapatnam Lok Sabha constituency within Andhra Pradesh

Visakhapatnam Lok Sabha constituency is one of the twenty-five lok sabha constituencies of Andhra Pradesh in India. It comprises seven assembly segments and belongs to Visakhapatnam district.

== Assembly segments ==
Visakhapatnam Lok Sabha constituency comprises the following Legislative Assembly segments:

#	Name	District	Member	Party	Leading (in 2024)
19	Srungavarapukota	Vizianagaram	Kolla Lalitha Kumari	TDP	TDP
20	Bheemili	Visakhapatnam	Ganta Srinivasa Rao	TDP	TDP
21	Visakhapatnam East	Visakhapatnam	Velagapudi Ramakrishna Babu	TDP	TDP
22	Visakhapatnam South	Visakhapatnam	Vamsi Krishna Srinivas	JSP	TDP
23	Visakhapatnam North	Visakhapatnam	Penmetsa Vishnu Kumar Raju	BJP	TDP
24	Visakhapatnam West	Visakhapatnam	P. G. V. R. Naidu	TDP	TDP
25	Gajuwaka	Visakhapatnam	Palla Srinivas Rao Yadav	TDP	TDP

== Members of Parliament ==
Year	Member	Party
1952	Lanka Sundaram	Independent
1952	Gam Malludora	Independent
1957	Pusapati Vijayarama Gajapati Raju	Indian National Congress
1962	Maharajkumar of Vizianagram	Indian National Congress
1967	Tenneti Viswanadham	Indian National Congress
1971	Pusapati Vijayarama Gajapati Raju	Indian National Congress (R)
1977	Dronamraju Satyanarayana	Indian National Congress (R)
1980	Appalaswamy Kommuru	Indian National Congress
1984	Bhattam Srirama Murthy	Telugu Desam Party
1989	Uma Gajapathi Raju	Indian National Congress
1991	M. V. V. S. Murthi	Telugu Desam Party
1996	T. Subbarami Reddy	Indian National Congress
1998	T. Subbarami Reddy	Indian National Congress
1999	M. V. V. S. Murthi	Telugu Desam Party
2004	N. Janardhana Reddy	Indian National Congress
2009	Daggubati Purandeswari	Indian National Congress
2014	Kambhampati Hari Babu	Bharatiya Janata Party
2019	M. V. V. Satyanarayana	YSR Congress Party
2024	Mathukumilli Bharat	Telugu Desam Party

== Election results ==
=== General Election 2024 ===
2024 Indian general elections: Visakhapatnam
Party	Candidate	Votes	%	±%
TDP	Mathukumilli Sribharat	907,467	65.42	▲30.53
YSRCP	Botcha Jhansi Lakshmi	4,03,220	29.07	▼6.17
INC	Pulusu Satyanarayana Reddy	30,267	2.18	▲1.00
PSP	K. A. Paul	7,696	0.55	N/A
NOTA	None of the above	5,313	0.38	▼0.96
Majority		5,04,247	36.35	▲36.00
Turnout		13,91,130	72.03	▲4.24
TDP gain from YSRCP		Swing		

=== General Election 2019 ===
2019 Indian general elections: Visakhapatnam
Party	Candidate	Votes	%	±%
YSRCP	M. V. V. Satyanarayana	436,906	35.24	−5.70
TDP	Mathukumilli Sribharat	4,32,492	34.89	N/A
JSP	V. V. Lakshminarayana	2,88,874	23.30	N/A
BJP	Daggubati Purandeswari	33,892	2.73	−45.98
NOTA	None of the above	16,646	1.34	
INC	Pedada Ramanikumari	14,633	1.18	−3.74
Majority		4,414	0.35	
Turnout		12,39,921	67.79	+0.25
Registered electors		18,29,300		
YSRCP gain from BJP		Swing		

=== General Election 2014 ===
2014 Indian general elections: Visakhapatnam
Party	Candidate	Votes	%	±%
BJP	Kambhampati Hari Babu	566,832	48.71	+45.71
YSRCP	Y. S. Vijayamma	4,76,344	40.94	+40.94
INC	Bolisetti Satyanarayana	50,632	4.35	−32.08
BSP	Imandi Venkata Kurmarao	14,947	1.28	+0.41
JSP	Sabbam Hari	6,644	0.57	+0.57
NOTA	None of the Above	7,329	0.63	+0.63
Majority		90,488	7.78	+1.20
Turnout		11,63,558	67.54	−5.41
BJP gain from INC		Swing	+12.28	

=== General Election 2009 ===
2009 Indian general elections: Visakhapatnam
Party	Candidate	Votes	%	±%
INC	Daggubati Purandeswari	368,812	36.43	
PRP	Palla Srinivasa Rao	3,02,126	29.85	
TDP	Dr. M. V. V. S. Murthi	2,23,117	22.04	
LSP	M. T. Venkateswaralu	39,363	3.89	
BJP	D. V. Subbarao	30,336	3.00	
Majority		66,686	6.58	
Turnout		10,12,261	72.95	
INC hold		Swing		

=== General Election 2004 ===
General Election, 2004: Visakhapatnam
Party	Candidate	Votes	%	±%
INC	Nedurumalli Janardhana Reddy	524,122	54.27	+8.71
TDP	Dr. M. V. V. S. Murthi	3,93,551	40.75	−9.21
BSP	Kolaventi Sundara Rao	16,673	1.73	
Majority		130,571	13.52	+17.92
Turnout		965,740	63.75	−0.65
INC gain from TDP		Swing	+8.71	

=== General Election 1998 ===
1998 Indian general election: Visakhapatnam
Party	Candidate	Votes	%	±%
INC	T. Subbarami Reddy	375,782	42.21	
TDP	Pusapati Ananda Gajapati Raju	3,14,265	35.30	
BJP	D. V. Subba Rao	1,95,452	21.96	
Margin of victory		61,517	6.91	
Turnout		8,90,170	65.00	
INC hold		Swing		

== See also ==
- List of constituencies of the Andhra Pradesh Legislative Assembly
