= Viswamitra (film) =

2019 Telugu-language film

- Theatrical release poster
- Directed by: Raj Kiran
- Produced by: Madhavi Addanki; S Rajinikanth; Raj Kiran
- Starring: Nanditha Raj; Satyam Rajesh; Ashutosh Rana; Prasanna
- Cinematography: Anil Bhandari
- Edited by: Upendra
- Music by: Anup Rubens
- Production companies: Raaja Kiran Cinemas; Madhuram Movie Creations
- Release date: 14 June 2019
- Running time: 133 minutes
- Country: India
- Language: Telugu

Viswamitra is a 2019 Telugu-language horror thriller film directed by Raj Kiran. The film stars Nanditha Raj and Satyam Rajesh in the titular roles with Ashutosh Rana and Prasanna.

== Plot ==
Mitra is a dedicated employee at a company where her manager, Rana, is attracted to her and makes an effort to win her over. He sets up numerous obstacles for her in an attempt to get her, and a mysterious person always comes to her rescue.

== Cast ==
- Satyam Rajesh as Viswa
- Nanditha Raj as Mitra
- Ashutosh Rana as A. Rana, Mitra's boss
- Jeeva as S. M. L. Vasan C. I.
- Prasanna as K. Gopal C.I., Telangana Police Officer (Cameo Appearance)
- Vidyullekha Raman as Bujji, Mitra's friend
- Satya as Mitra's lover
- Chammak Chandra
- Getup Srinu
- Paruchuri Venkateswara Rao
- Rocket Raghava
- C. V. L. Narasimha Rao as Mitra's father
- Indu Anand
- Gundu Sudarshan

== Production ==
Director Raj Kiran announced that he would make a film based on true events that happened in the United States, Switzerland, and New Zealand. Nanditha Raj was roped in to play one of the lead roles. The film was made in a horror genre similar to Raj Kiran's previous films, Geethanjali and Tripura.

== Soundtrack ==
Soundtrack was composed by Anup Rubens.

- On the Rocks - Pranav Chaganti, Mounika Reddy
- Naalo Nenu - Swetha Menon

== Release ==
The trailer was released in February of 2019. The film was scheduled to release on 21 March 2019, but was further delayed to release in May of 2019. However, the film released on June 14.
