= Gajuwaka Assembly constituency =

Constituency of the Andhra Pradesh Legislative Assembly, India

Coordinates: 17.69°N 83.21°E

Gajuwaka
- Constituency No. 24 for the Andhra Pradesh Legislative Assembly
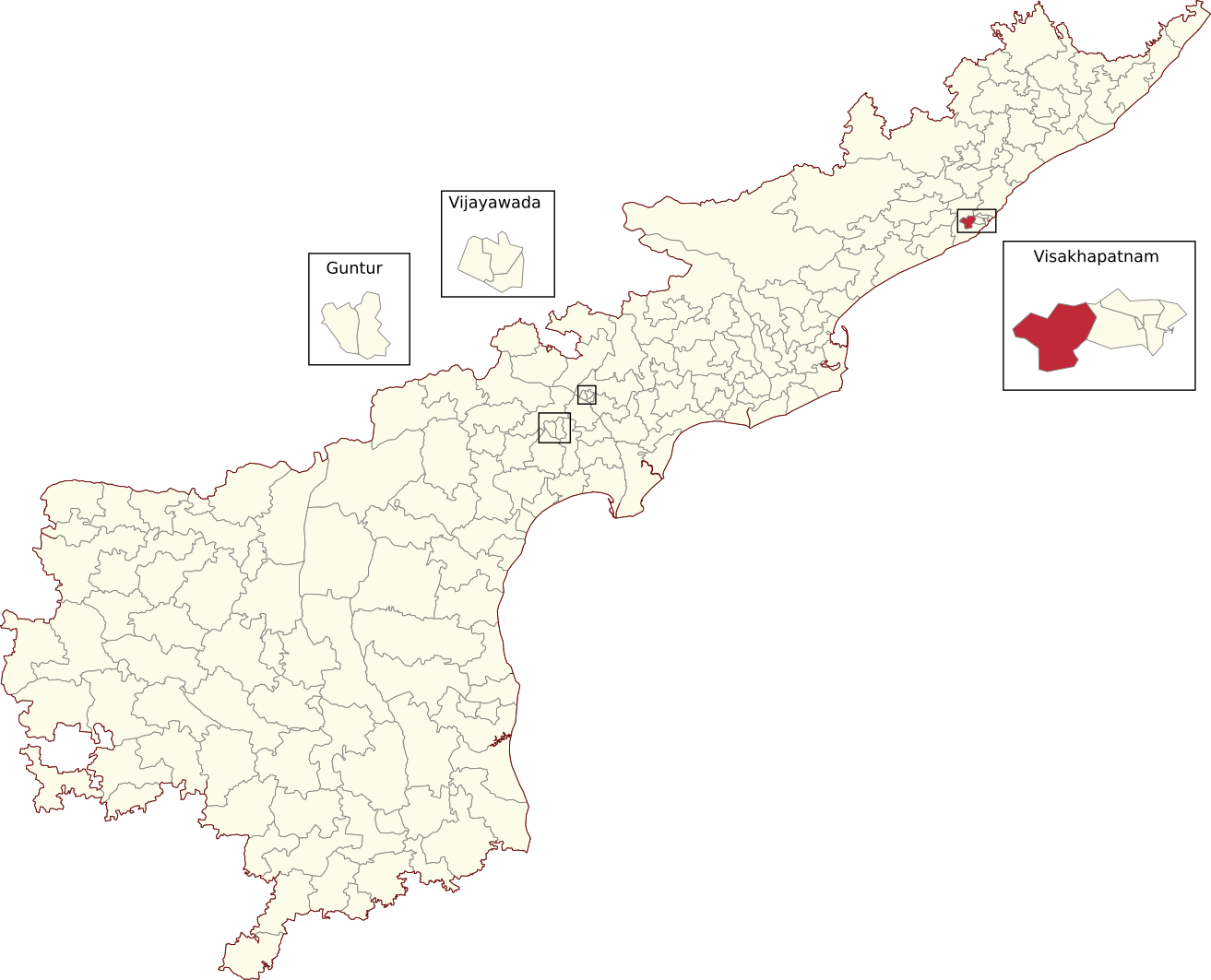
- Location of Gajuwaka Assembly constituency within Andhra Pradesh

Constituency details
- Country: India
- Region: South India
- State: Andhra Pradesh
- District: Visakhapatnam
- Lok Sabha constituency: Visakhapatnam
- Established: 2008
- Total electors: 3,10,011
- Reservation: None

Member of Legislative Assembly
- 16th Andhra Pradesh Legislative Assembly
- Incumbent Palla Srinivasa Rao
- Party: TDP
- Alliance: NDA
- Elected year: 2024

Gajuwaka Assembly constituency is a constituency in Visakhapatnam district of Andhra Pradesh that elects representatives to the Andhra Pradesh Legislative Assembly in India. It is one of the seven assembly segments of Visakhapatnam Lok Sabha constituency.

Palla Srinivasarao is the current MLA of the constituency, having won the 2024 Andhra Pradesh Legislative Assembly election from Telugu Desam Party. As of 2024, there are a total of 309,326 electors in the constituency. In terms of registered number of electors, it is the largest assembly constituency in the state. The constituency was established in 2008, as per the Delimitation Orders (2008).

== Mandals ==
There are two mandals that come under this constituency:

Mandals
Gajuwaka
Pedagantyada

== Members of the Legislative Assembly ==
Year	Member	Political party
2009	Chinthalapudi Venkataramaiah	Praja Rajyam Party
2014	Palla Srinivasa Rao	Telugu Desam Party
2019	Tippala Nagireddy	YSR Congress Party
2024	Palla Srinivasa Rao	Telugu Desam Party

== Election results ==
Vote share of Winning candidates
2024	67.30%
2019	37.78%
2014	51.54%
2009	33.20%

=== 2024 ===
2024 Andhra Pradesh Legislative Assembly election: Gajuwaka
Party	Candidate	Votes	%	±%
TDP	Palla Srinivasa Rao	157,703	67.30	▲38.88
YSRCP	Amarnath Gudivada	62,468	26.66	▼11.12
IND	Kakarlamudi Krishna Pradeep	4,316	1.84	
CPI(M)	Jaggu Naidu Maradana	3,970	1.69	
PSP	K. A. Paul	1,700	0.73	
NOTA	None of the Above	1,518	0.65	
BSP	Nandikolla Appa Rao	1,134	0.48	
IND	2 Independent Candidates	310	0.13	
OTH	6 Other Party Candidates	1,210	0.52	
Majority		95,235	40.64	▲32.23
Turnout		234,329	70.07	▲5.79
Swing to TDP from YSRCP		Swing		

=== 2019 ===
2019 Andhra Pradesh Legislative Assembly election: Gajuwaka
Party	Candidate	Votes	%	±%
YSRCP	Tippala Nagireddy	75,292	37.78	▼2.24
JSP	Pawan Kalyan	58,539	29.37	
TDP	Palla Srinivasa Rao	56,642	28.42	▼23.12
BJP	Pulusu Janardhana Rao	2,770	1.39	
NOTA	None of the Above	1,764	0.89	
INC	Gollakota Venkata Subba Rao	1,484	0.74	▼0.51
IND	2 Independent Candidates	859	0.43	
OTH	5 Other Party Candidates	1,934	0.97	
Majority		16,753	8.41	▼3.11
Turnout		199,284	64.28	▼0.64
Swing to YSRCP from TDP		Swing		

=== 2014 ===
2014 Andhra Pradesh Legislative Assembly election: Gajuwaka
Party	Candidate	Votes	%	±%
TDP	Palla Srinivasa Rao	97,109	51.54	
YSRCP	Tippala Nagireddy	75,397	40.02	
LSP	Jampana Sridevi	3,627	1.93	▼3.90
CPI(M)	Narasinga Rao Chandada	3,262	1.73	▼14.14
INC	Y. V. Sudhakar Naidu	2,350	1.25	▼17.99
CPI	Appari Joseph Stalin	1,505	0.80	
NOTA	None of the Above	1,103	0.59	
IND	6 Independent Candidates	1,910	1.01	
OTH	5 Other Party Candidates	2,138	1.13	
Majority		21,712	11.52	▼0.14
Turnout		188,401	64.92	▼4.61
Swing to TDP from PRP		Swing		

=== 2009 ===
2009 Andhra Pradesh Legislative Assembly election: Gajuwaka
Party	Candidate	Votes	%	±%
PRP	Chinthalapudi Venkataramaiah	50,994	33.20	
IND	Nagi Reddy Tippala	33,087	21.54	
INC	Gurumurthi Reddy Tippala	29,547	19.24	
CPI(M)	Chandada Narasinga Rao	24,371	15.87	
LSP	Ananda Beeharilal Gottimukkala	8,959	5.83	
BJP	G. Sasidharan Pillai	1,719	1.12	
IND	Gurunaidu Mudadla	1,618	1.05	
BSP	Cheekatla Prasad Gandhi	806	0.52	
IND	Ashok Vardhan	493	0.32	
OTH	2 Other Party Candidates	2,002	1.30	
Majority		17,907	11.66	
Turnout		153,596	69.53	
PRP win (new seat)				

== Trivia ==
- In the 2019 election, Deputy Chief Minister and actor Pawan Kalyan contested from this constituency and the Bhimavaram Assembly constituency in his electoral debut, but was defeated in both seats.

== See also ==
- List of constituencies of the Andhra Pradesh Legislative Assembly
