= Luckunnodu =

- Theatrical release poster
- Directed by: Raj Kiran
- Written by: Diamond Ratnababu
- Produced by: M. V. V. Satyanarayana
- Starring: Vishnu Manchu; Hansika Motwani
- Cinematography: P. G. Vinda
- Music by: Praveen Lakkaraju; Achu Rajamani (1 song)
- Production company: MVV Cinema
- Release date: 26 January 2017
- Running time: 118 minutes
- Country: India
- Language: Telugu

Luckunnodu (transl. The lucky man) is a 2017 Telugu-language action comedy thriller film directed by Raj Kiran. The film stars Vishnu Manchu and Hansika Motwani. It marks the acting debut of producer M. V. V. Satyanarayana as a villain.

== Plot ==
A gangster robs a bank, but another person steals his theft and hands the bag full of money to Lucky, a young man who is known for his coincidence of bad luck with good luck. Frustrated and restless, Lucky is determined to regain the possession of his loot.

== Cast ==
- Vishnu Manchu as Lucky
- Hansika Motwani as "Positive" Padma
- M. V. V. Satyanarayana as JK, a Mumbai-based business man
- Vennela Kishore as the C.E.O. of Kony Solutions
- Tanikella Bharani as Padmarao, Padma's Father
- Raghu Babu as Lucky's Uncle
- Jayaprakash as Bhakthavatsalam, Lucky's Father
- Posani Krishna Murali as Shaik Nayeem
- Suresh as Police Commissioner
- Satyam Rajesh as Lucky's friend
- Fish Venkat as JK's henchman
- Prabhas Sreenu as Pulihora, a thief
- Lucinda Nicholas as Lavanya
- Shravan as Anthony, JK's henchman
- Mohan Babu as himself in the song "What Da F"

== Production ==
Director Raj Kiran, who was known for directing the film Geethanjali announced his next project with Vishnu Manchu in the lead role. The name Luckunnodu was finalized after previous movies with similar names had been successful due to their catchy names including Speedunnodu and Sarrainodu.

Hansika Motwani was selected to play the female lead opposite Vishnu, marking her third collaboration with him after Denikaina Ready and Pandavulu Pandavulu Tummeda.

== Soundtrack ==
Praveen Lakkaraju composed all of the music except for one song, "Ravera", which was composed by Achu Rajamani. All the songs were released under the Silly Monks Music label with the song "O Siri Malli" being released under the Sony Music label.

Luckunnodu

Soundtrack album by Praveen Lakkaraju
- Released: 10 Jan 2017
- Recorded: 2016
- Genre: Soundtrack
- Length: 14:08
- Label: Silly Monks Music; Sony Music
- Producer: Praveen Lakkaraju

Praveen Lakkaraju chronology
Express Raja (2016)	Luckunnodu (2017)

Track List
No.	Title	Lyrics	Music	Singer(s)	Length
1.	"What Da F"	Sreejo	Praveen Lakkaraju	Adnan Sami, Praveen Lakkaraju
2.	"Ravera"	Krishna Kanth	Achu Rajamani	Lipsika, Revanth
3.	"Aisa Laga"	Pallavi, Gita Pootnik G, Sreejo	Praveen Lakkaraju	Mohana Bhogaraju, Simha, Praveen Lakkaraju
4.	"O Siri Malli"		Praveen Lakkaraju	Bappi Lahiri, Anurag Kulkarni

== Release ==
Luckunnodu released in January 2017 and was expected to clash with Si3. This film was saved at box office as the latter's release date was postponed.

== Reception ==
=== Critical response ===
Suhas Yellapantula from The New Indian Express wrote "You pinch yourself to believe it when he says it a second time, but when you realise that it's a constant fixture in the film -- you know it's time to leave the theatre". Ch Sowmya Sruthi from The Times of India says "The episodes in the first half where Vishnu Manchu imitates his dad Mohan Babu’s dialogue delivery got the loudest whistles".
