= Visakhapatnam East Assembly constituency =

Constituency of the Andhra Pradesh Legislative Assembly, India

Coordinates: 17.70°N 83.30°E

Visakhapatnam East
- Constituency No. 21 for the Andhra Pradesh Legislative Assembly
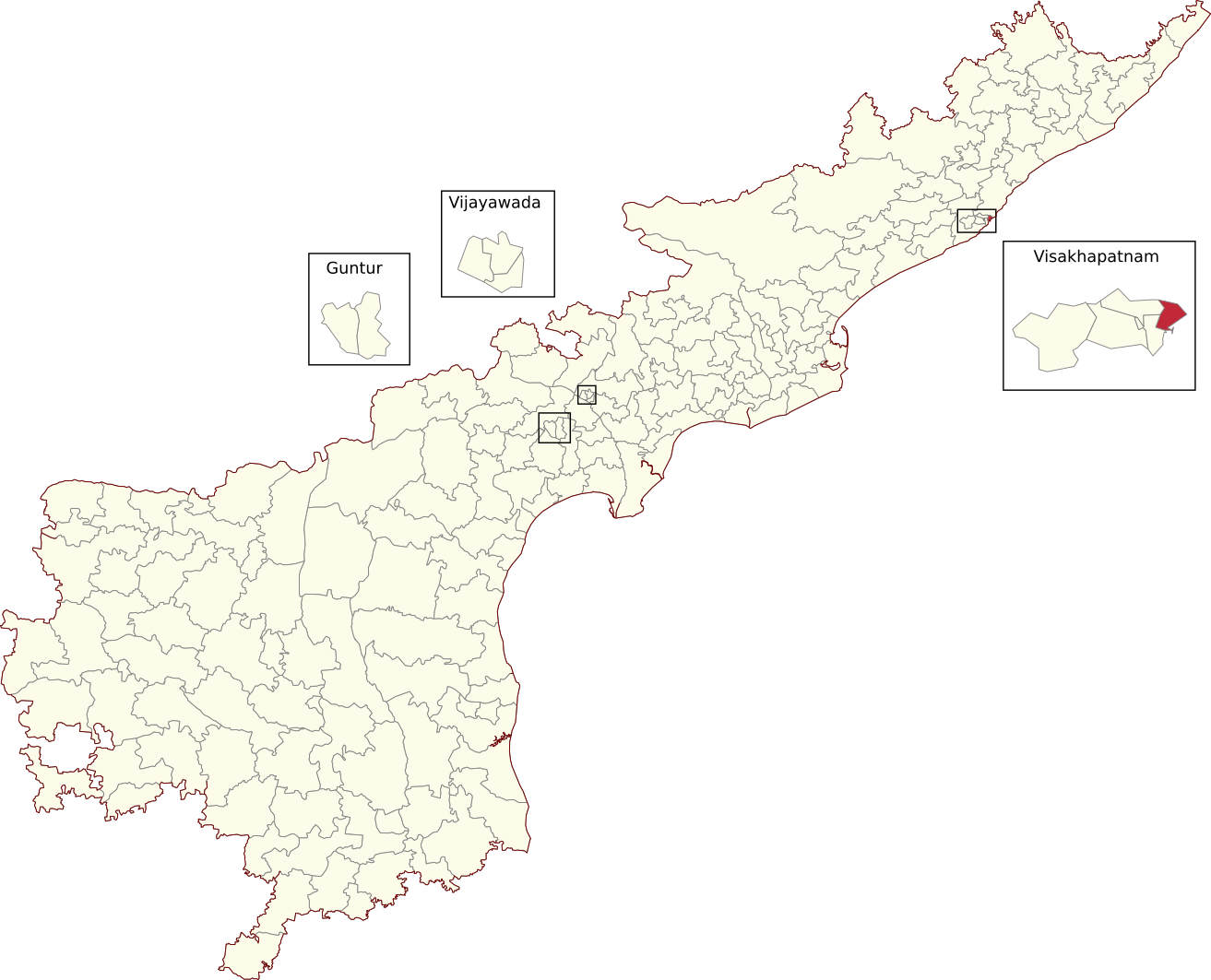
- Location of Visakhapatnam East Assembly constituency within Andhra Pradesh

Constituency details
- Country: India
- Region: South India
- State: Andhra Pradesh
- District: Visakhapatnam
- Lok Sabha constituency: Visakhapatnam
- Established: 2008
- Total electors: 272,215
- Reservation: None

Member of Legislative Assembly
- 16th Andhra Pradesh Legislative Assembly
- Incumbent Velagapudi Ramakrishna Babu
- Party: TDP
- Alliance: NDA
- Elected year: 2024

Visakhapatnam East Assembly constituency is a constituency in Visakhapatnam district of Andhra Pradesh that elects representatives to the Andhra Pradesh Legislative Assembly in India. It is one of the seven assembly segments of Visakhapatnam Lok Sabha constituency.

Velagapudi Ramakrishna Babu is the current MLA of the constituency, having won the 2024 Andhra Pradesh Legislative Assembly election from Telugu Desam Party. As of 2024, there are a total of 271,215 electors in the constituency. The constituency was established in 2008, as per the Delimitation Orders (2008).

== Mandals ==
The mandal and wards that form the assembly constituency are:

Mandal
Visakhapatnam (Urban) Mandal (Part) Visakhapatnam (M.Corp) Ward No. 1 to 11 and 53 to 55

== Members of the Legislative Assembly ==
Year	Member	Political party
2009	Velagapudi Ramakrishna Babu	Telugu Desam Party
2014	Velagapudi Ramakrishna Babu	Telugu Desam Party
2019	Velagapudi Ramakrishna Babu	Telugu Desam Party
2024	Velagapudi Ramakrishna Babu	Telugu Desam Party

== Election results ==
=== 2009 ===
2009 Andhra Pradesh Legislative Assembly election: Visakhapatnam East
Party	Candidate	Votes	%	±%
TDP	Velagapudi Ramakrishna Babu	44,233	32.03	
PRP	Chennuboina Srinivasa Rao	40,202	29.11	
INC	Appa Rao Vurukuti	38,098	27.59	
LSP	Jhansi Lakshmi Ravala	10,022	7.35	
BJP	K. Rajakumari	2,218	1.62	
Majority		4,031	2.92	
Turnout		138,104	68.22	
TDP win (new seat)				

=== 2014 ===
2014 Andhra Pradesh Legislative Assembly election: Visakhapatnam East
Party	Candidate	Votes	%	±%
TDP	Velagapudi Ramakrishna Babu	100,624	60.45	
YSRCP	Vamsi Krishna Srinivas	52,741	31.69	
INC	Prabha Goud Doddi	2,783	1.67	
LSP	Madenu Anil Kumar	2,716	1.63	
CPI(M)	Kumar R. K. S. V. M.	1,649	0.99	
NOTA	None of the Above	1,042	0.63	
Majority		47,883	28.77	
Turnout		166,453	64.82	
TDP win (new seat)				

=== 2019 ===
2019 Andhra Pradesh Legislative Assembly election: Visakhapatnam East
Party	Candidate	Votes	%	±%
TDP	Velagapudi Ramakrishna Babu	87,073	50.10	
YSRCP	Akkaramani Vijaya Nirmala	60,599	34.87	
JSP	Tatarao Kona	17,873	10.28	
BJP	Suhasini Komaragiri	2,843	1.64	
NOTA	None of the Above	1,741	1.00	
INC	Vajjiparthi Srinivasa Rao	1,663	0.96	
Majority		26,474	15.23	
Turnout		173,804	63.79	
TDP hold		Swing		

=== 2024 ===
2024 Andhra Pradesh Legislative Assembly election: Visakhapatnam East
Party	Candidate	Votes	%	±%
TDP	Velagapudi Ramakrishna Babu	132,047	64.89	
YSRCP	M. V. V. Satyanarayana	61,170	30.06	
IND	Vaddi Sirisha	3,508	1.72	
INC	Guthula Srinivas Rao	3,430	1.69	
NOTA	None of the Above	1,508	0.74	
Majority		70,877	34.83	
Turnout		203,494	69.58	
TDP hold		Swing		

== See also ==
- List of constituencies of the Andhra Pradesh Legislative Assembly
