= Mathukumilli Bharat =

Indian educationist and politician

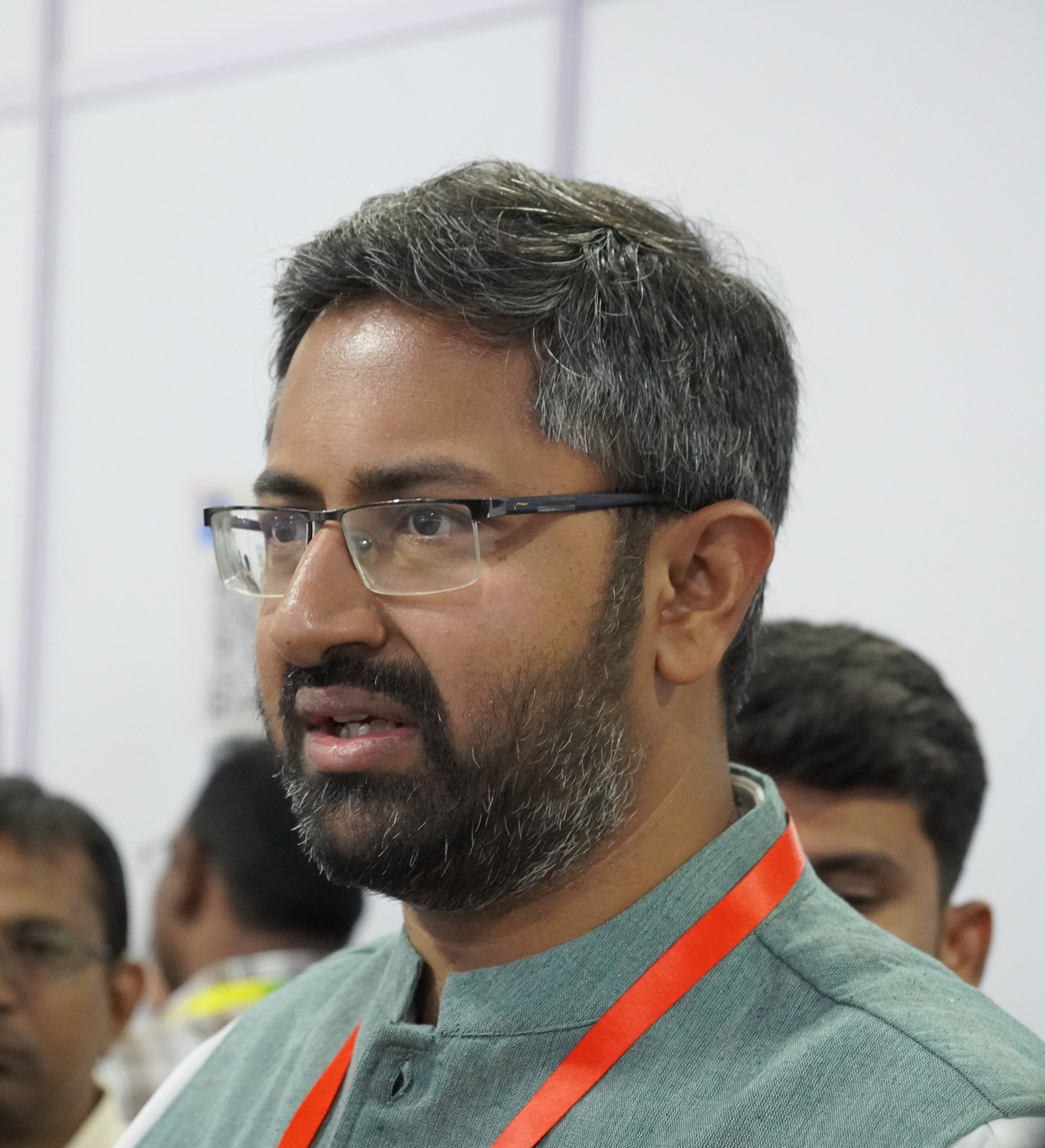

Member of the Parliament, Lok Sabha
- Incumbent
- Assumed office 4 June 2024
- Preceded by: M. V. V. Satyanarayana
- Constituency: Visakhapatnam

Personal details
- Party: Telugu Desam Party
- Relatives: Nandamuri Balakrishna (father-in-law); M. V. V. S. Murthi (grand father) Nara Lokesh (co-brother)
- Education: Purdue University (Industrial Engineering); Stanford University (M.B.A. and MA Joint Degree)
- Occupation: President GITAM
- Website: www.gitam.edu/about/president

Mathukumilli Sribharat is an Indian educationist and politician who is member of 18th Lok Sabha . He also serves as the President of Gandhi Institute of Technology and Management (GITAM), a private deemed university located in Visakhapatnam, Hyderabad and Bengaluru. He is also the founder of Hyderabad-based Kautilya School of Public Policy that offers masters and doctoral programs in public policy.

== Education ==
Bharat holds an undergraduate degree in Industrial Engineering from Purdue University, West Lafayette, Class of 2010. He also obtained a joint MBA/MA Education degree from Stanford University, Palo Alto, CA, USA, Class of 2016.

== Family ==
He is the grandson of M. V. V. S. Murthi, who is the founder of GITAM and former MP of Visakhapatnam, and of Kavuri Samba Siva Rao, another former MP of Machilipatnam and Eluru. He is married to Nandamuri Tejaswini, the younger daughter of Nandamuri Balakrishna.

== Politics ==
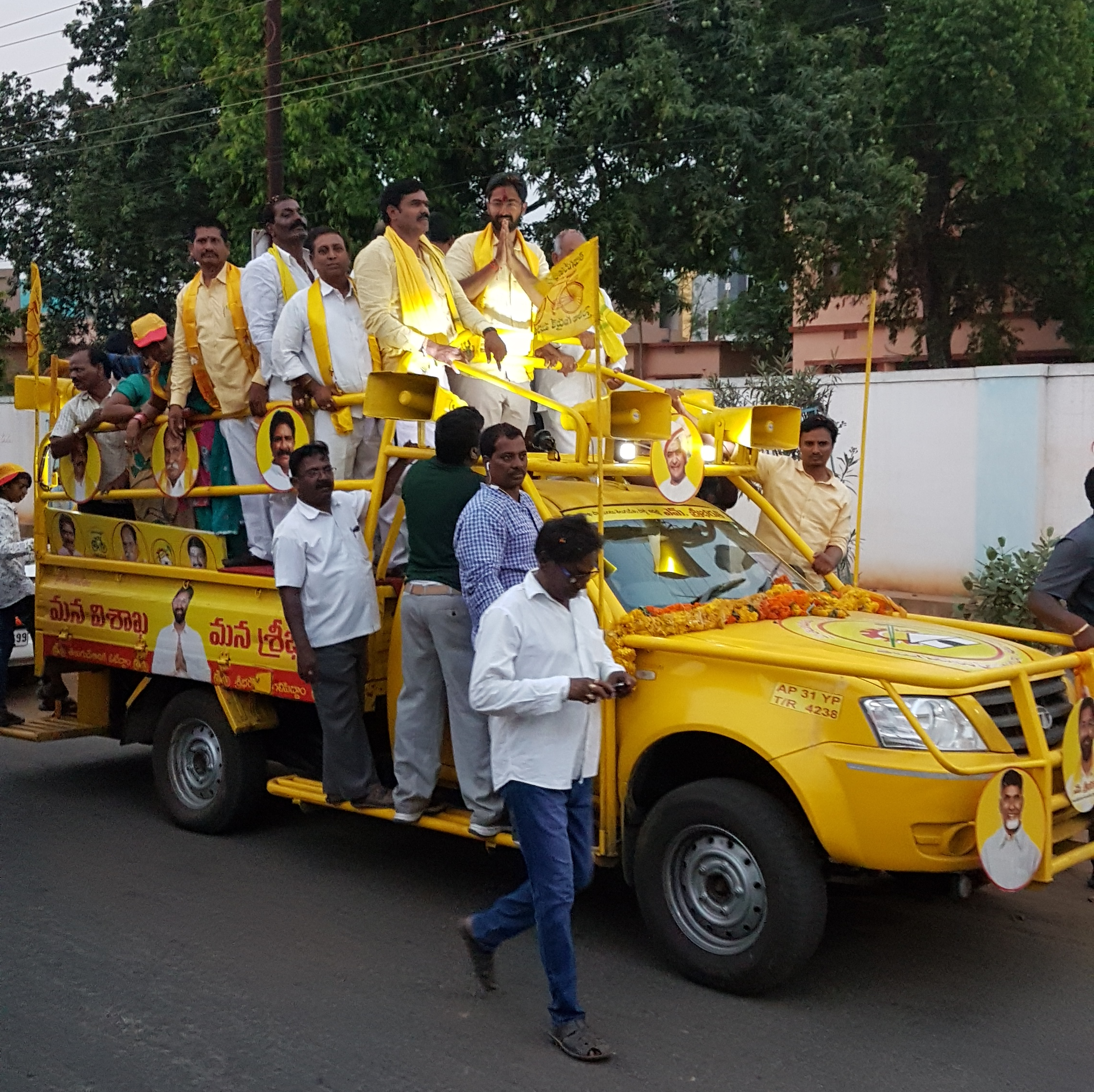
Mathukumilli Bharat campaigning in 2019

Bharat is a member of Telugu Desam Party having contested from Visakhapatnam Lok Sabha constituency for the first time in Indian General Elections 2019. He lost by a margin of 4414 votes in 2019. For the 2024 Indian General Elections he is again declared as a candidate from Vishakapatnam Lok Sabha constituency and won the election by close to 5 lakh votes.

== Election results ==
=== General Election 2024 ===
2024 Indian general elections: Visakhapatnam
Party	Candidate	Votes	%	±%
TDP	Mathukumilli Sribharat	907,467	65.42	▲30.53
YSRCP	Botcha Jhansi Lakshmi	4,03,220	29.07	▼6.17
INC	Pulusu Satyanarayana Reddy	30,267	2.18	▲1.00
PSP	K. A. Paul	7,696	0.55	N/A
NOTA	None of the above	5,313	0.38	▼0.96
Majority		5,04,247	36.35	▲36.00
Turnout		13,87,125	71.11	▲3.33
TDP gain from YSRCP		Swing		
