= Raj Kiran =

Raj Kiran may refer to:

- Raj Kiran (actor) (born 1949), Bollywood actor
- Raj Kiran (director), Indian film director
- Rajkiran (born 1954), Tamil actor
