= Srungavarapukota =

- Town
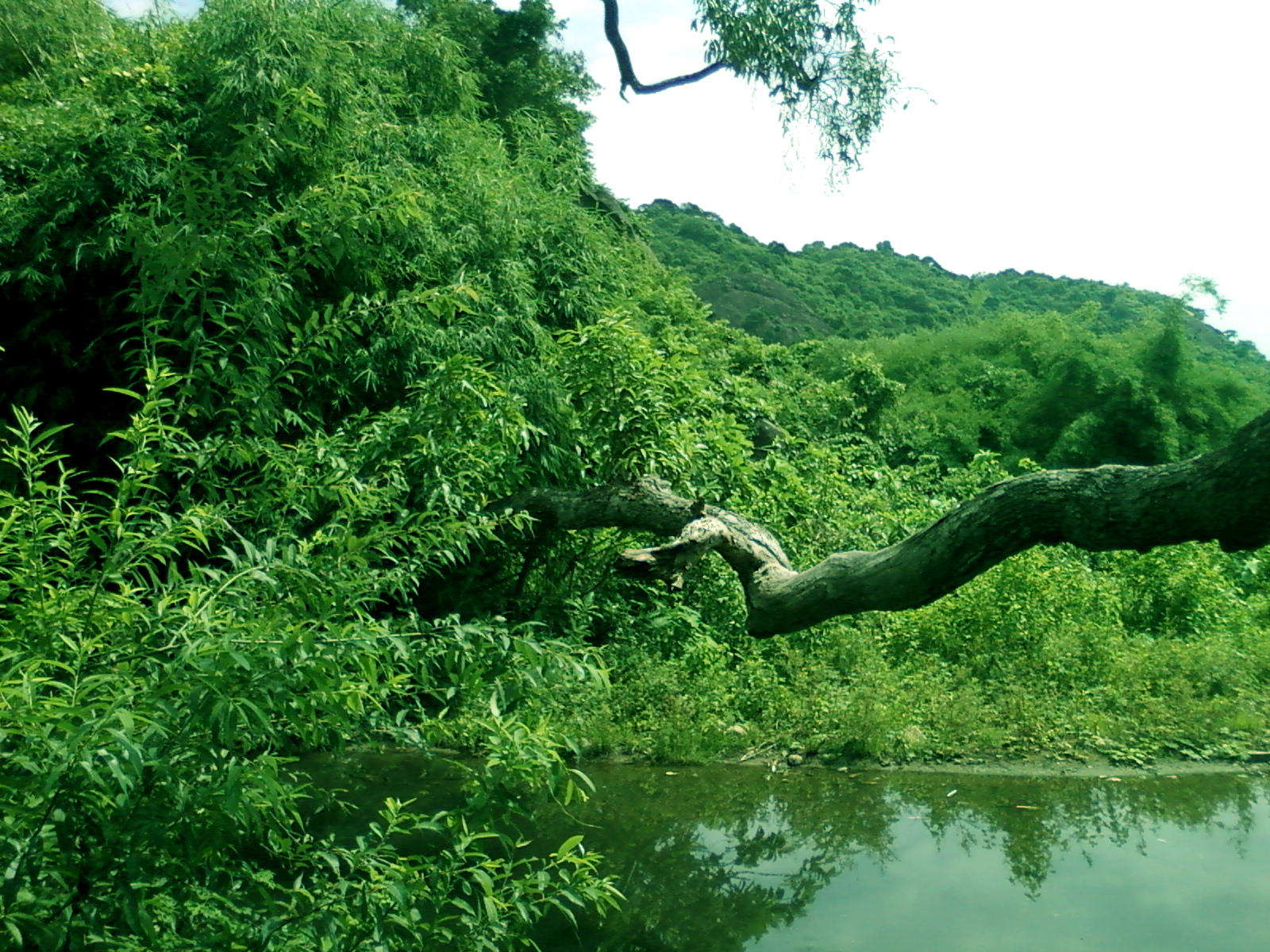
- Eastern Ghats at Srungavarapukota

- Location in Andhra Pradesh, India
- Coordinates: 18.1167°N 83.1667°E
- Country: India
- State: Andhra Pradesh
- District: Vizianagaram

Government
  - Type: Nagar Panchayat
  - MLA: Kotha Lalitha Kumari

Population (2011)
  - Total: 28,304

Languages
  - Official: Telugu
- Time zone: UTC+5:30 (IST)
- PIN: 535145
- Telephone code: 08966
- Vehicle Registration: AP35 (Former); AP39 (from 30 January 2019)
- Vidhan Sabha constituency: Srungavarapukota
- Lok Sabha constituency: Visakhapatnam

Srungavarapukota, popularly known by its abbreviated form S.Kota, is a neighbourhood in the district of Vizianagaram, India. S.Kota is located on Visakhapatnam – Araku road. The town was upgraded from gram panchayat to Nagar Panchayat in the year 2011.

== Location and geography ==
Srungavarapukota is located about 46 km from Visakhapatnam Airport and about 38 km from Vizianagaram railway station. It lies to the north-west of Visakhapatnam City and is loosely bordered by Kothavalasa to the south and Vizianagaram to the east, Salur to the north, Araku to the west.

Srungavarapukota is located at 18.1167°N 83.1667°E. It is at an average altitude of 70 meters (232 feet).

Srungavarapukota railway station is located on Kothavalasa-Kirandul line under East Coast Railway, Indian Railways.

== Demography ==
As of 2001 census, S. Kota Mandal had a population of 74,413. Males constitute 36,586 and females 37,827 of the population. This phenomenon of females outnumbering males is an unusual phenomenon. The average literacy rate is 59%. Male literacy rate is 70% and that of females 48%.

There are 40 revenue villages and 26 gram panchayats in Srungavarapukota Mandal.

== Politics ==
Srungavarapukota (Assembly constituency) is reserved for General. There are 1,42,285 registered voters in this constituency.

Year	Candidate	Party
1989	Dukku Labudu Bariki	TDP
1994	Dukku Labudu Bariki	TDP
1999	Hymavathi Devi Sobha	TDP
2004	Dr. Kumbha Ravi Babu	INC
2009	Kolla Lalitha Kumari	TDP
2014	Kolla Lalitha Kumari	TDP
2019	Kadubandi Srinivasa Rao	YSRCP
2024	Kolla Lalitha Kumari	TDP

== Transport ==
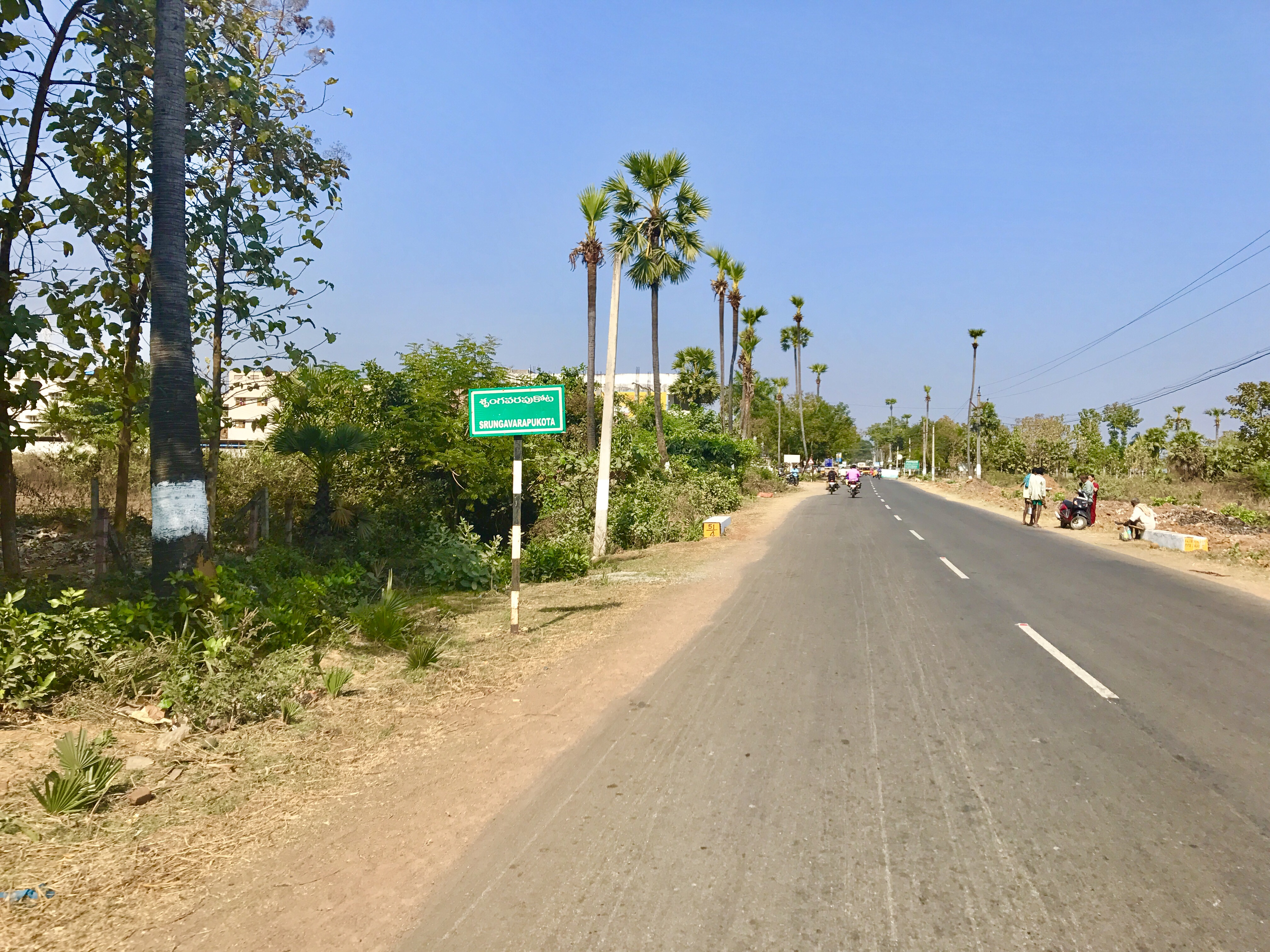
Srungavarapukota Board

S.Kota is located on Visakhapatnam - Araku road. APS RTC runs bus services from S.Kota depot to all major bus station in the District.
