= Geethanjali Malli Vachindi =

2024 Indian horror comedy film

- Theatrical release poster
- Directed by: Siva Turlapati
- Screenplay by: Bhanu Bogavarapu; Nandu Savarigana; Kona Venkat
- Story by: Kona Venkat
- Produced by: Kona Venkat; M. V. V. Satyanarayana
- Starring: Anjali; Srinivasa Reddy; Sunil; Satyam Rajesh; Shakalaka Shankar; Satya; Rahul Madhav
- Cinematography: Sujatha Siddharth
- Edited by: Chota K. Prasad
- Music by: Pravin Lakkaraju
- Production companies: MVV Cinema; Kona Film Corporation
- Release date: 11 April 2024
- Running time: 144 minutes
- Country: India
- Language: Telugu

Geethanjali Malli Vachindi (transl. Geethanjali came again) is a 2024 Indian Telugu-language comedy horror film directed by debutant Siva Thurlapati. Produced by Kona Venkat and M. V. V. Satyanarayana through Kona Film Corporation and MVV Cinema respectively, the film stars Anjali, Srinivasa Reddy, Sunil, Satyam Rajesh, Shakalaka Shankar, Satya, and Rahul Madhav in lead roles. It is a sequel to the 2014 film Geethanjali. The film was released on 11 April 2024.

== Plot ==
Sreenu, Athreya, and Arudra reside in a penthouse. Sreenu achieved success with his film "Geetanjali," followed by three box office failures. Ayan operates a fast-food cart in Vizag and is Sreenu's close friend. Ayan boasts his girlfriend's father about becoming a movie star with Sreenu directing a new film produced by Dil Raju. However, Sreenu discovers the deception upon arriving in Hyderabad and decides to abandon the film industry after a small farewell party.

The following day, they receive an offer from Govinda Govinda's boss Vishnu, who also wrote a script for a horror comedy and chose Srinu to direct. That's why he decided to produce a film, with Sreenu directing and Athreya and Arudra writing. Sreenu insists on casting Ayan as the lead, or he won't direct, he immediately accepts. Meanwhile, Ventriloquist Venkat Rao gets Geethanjali again now trapped in a doll by another Babaji in a corporate office for killing an HR who sexually harassed his women employee in the office. Now she demands Venkat Rao to find her sister, Ushanjali, who runs a struggling coffee shop in Ooty.

Upon reaching Ooty, they meet Vishnu, who narrates the movie's premise and offers his bungalow for shooting. Unbeknownst to them, the bungalow, Sangeeth Mahal, is haunted by three ghosts named Nataraja Sastry, his wife Lakshmi, and his younger daughter Mohini, who earlier belonged to a classical dancers' family they are committing honor killings in the Bangalow who came to stay because his elder daughter eloped with her boyfriend later Mohini also loved a guy and decided to elope but got caught by her parents who later bashes her lover to stay away from their daughter then he committed suicide. Unbearable to hear Mohini immolated herself in the Sangeeth Mahal which caused a fire accident that led to the whole family's death. This is the story based on which Vishnu narrates them to direct the film.

Meanwhile, Vishnu also suggests Ushanjali as the lead actress, after reconciliation with old friends Anjali decides to help them to accept his offer. During the shooting, they encounter the ghosts but Srinu, Govinda, Arudra, and Athreya know facts to save this film they make them believe the whole crew that they are as method actors. However, on 8 August, the ghosts disrupt a crucial scene. Then it is revealed that Vishnu is the son of Ramesh Rao who seeks vengeance on the gang for killing his father by using Geethaanjali so he decided to kill them in the same manner. So he inquired about Sangeeth Mahal and personally encountered the ghosts and decided this was the perfect place to trap them to death, that's why he bought the bungalow and called them to make a film with them and acted not believing in ghosts and pressured them to complete the film in the Mahal. It is also revealed that he killed Anjali's boyfriend who wanted to recruit him under his company the facts were not known to anyone.

Meanwhile, Srinu confesses all the facts to Ushanjali then they decide to steal the agreement papers so they enter his house. After seeing Ramesh's photo hanging they understand his intentions behind making this film. Then suddenly Vishnu enters home meanwhile Ramesh Rao's ghost seeking vengeance possesses his son and kills Arudra and Athreya. When he is about to kill Ushanjali and Srinu, Meanwhile, Venkat Rao reaches there with the possessed doll and hands it to the group who are hiding and gives the doll to them then Geetanjali is released from the doll in a stampede. Then she possesses Ushanjali and fights with Ramesh Rao thus challenging him to death implicating that whenever he comes she will also come for him and will defeat him, then she traps him into another doll with the help of a mirror and kills Vishnu, saving her sister and ending the film.

== Cast ==
- Anjali in a dual role as
  - Geetanjali
  - Ushanjali
- Srinivasa Reddy as Srinivas "Srinu"
- Satya as Ayaneshwer "Ayan" Rao
- Satyam Rajesh as Athreya
- Shakalaka Shankar as Arudra
- Rahul Madhav as Vishnu, son of Ramesh Rao, who seeks revenge for his father's death on Anjali, Srinu and his gang.
- Srikanth Iyengar as Govinda Govinda
- Ali as Ventriloquist Venkat Rao
- Sunil as Killer Nani, a cinematographer
- Ravi Krishna as Ushanjali's boyfriend.
- P. Ravi Shankar as Nataraja Sastri
- Rao Ramesh as Ramesh Rao, father of Vishnu (cameo Appearance)
- Mamilla Shailaja Priya as Lakshmi
- M. V. V. Satyanarayana as himself (cameo appearance)
- Goparaju Ramana as a tea seller
- Mukku Avinash
- Srinivas D. D.
- Sai Srinivas
- Yadam Raju
- Vasu Inturi
- Kavitha Bharathy
- Srinivas Vajpayee
- Dil Raju as himself (cameo appearance)
- Macha Ravi as himself (cameo appearance)
- Suresh Kondeti as Suresh, a film journalist
- Geddam Naveen
- Siddharth Gollapudi as CEO
- Shiva Turlapati as himself (cameo appearance)

== Production ==
=== Development ===
The sequel to the Anjali starrer Geethanjali, titled Geethanjali Malli Vachindhi, commenced its shoot in September 2023. The announcement was made through a Muhurtham pooja ceremony. Anjali is set to portray her role in this horror comedy, marking her 50th film.

=== Filming ===
Filming for Geethanjali Malli Vachindhi took place in Hyderabad and Ooty. The filmmakers completed the shooting covering 80% of principal photography first, after which the team wrapped up the remaining shoot.

The first look of the film was released on 1 January 2024, marking the occasion of New Year. The teaser of the film was then released on 24 February 2024.

== Soundtrack ==
Geethanjali

Soundtrack album by Praveen Lakkaraju
- Recorded: 2024
- Genre: Soundtrack
- Length: 17:55
- Label: Mango Music

Praveen Lakkaraju chronology
Puli Meka (2023)	Geethanjali (2024)

Track listing
No.	Title	Lyrics	Singer(s)	Length
1.	"Rent Ki Dabbu Ledhu"	Bhaskarabhatla	Ram Miriyala	3:29
2.	"Nanna"	Srinivasa Mouli	Sai Veda Vagdevi	2:57
3.	"Vinaroo (Shambhoo Shambhoo)"	Sreejo	Dinker Kalvala, Lipsika	2:34
4.	"Nuvvee Raavaa Raavaa"	Sreejo	Ramya Behara, Aditya Iyengar	3:29
5.	"Saatileru Le"	Sreejo	Sahithi Chaganti	2:25
6.	"Geethanjali Vai"	Balaji	Keertana Sesh, Praveen Lakkaraju	3:01
Total length:				17:55

== Release ==
The film was initially scheduled to release on 22 March 2024, but was later released on 11 April 2024. The film was premiered on Aha and Amazon Prime Video on 8 May 2024 and 11 May 2024 respectively.

== Reception ==
Times Now have cited it as "partly engaging" due to average background score, bad cinematography and weak screenplay, while praising the performances of the ensemble cast.
