= K. A. Paul =

Indian Christian evangelist (born 1963)

Anand Kilari
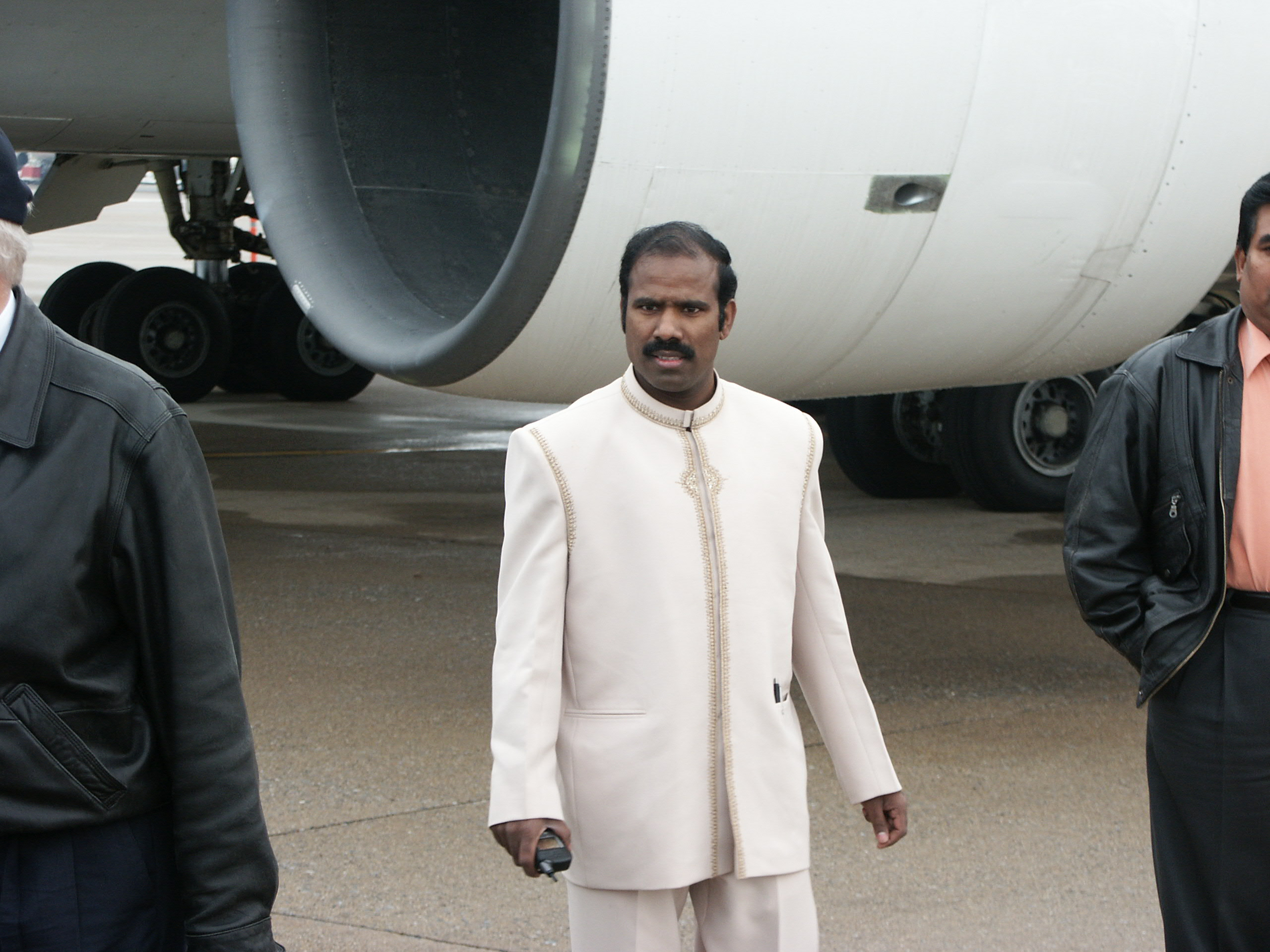
- Dr. K. A. Paul in 2005
- Born: 25 September 1963 (age 63); Visakhapatnam, Andhra Pradesh, India
- Other name: Kilari Anand Paul
- Education: Intermediate, 1981
- Occupation: Evangelist
- Political party: Praja Shanti Party
- Spouse: Mary Kilari
- Children: 3
- Father: Barnabas Kilari

Dr. Kilari Anand Paul (born September 10, 1963) is an Indian evangelist and politician. He is the founder of the US-based organizations Global Peace Initiative (GPI) and Gospel to the Unreached Millions (GUM) and has operated orphanages, including Charity City in Hyderabad. About 331 acres of 1000 acres land acquired by Paul and his brother for the Charity City was alleged to have been on assigned land and was being investigated. He was joined by Manoj Malla alias Bala Yesu in 2008, and started the Praja Shanti party that same year.

== Early life & Christian Conversion ==
Kilari Anand Paul was born in the village of Chittivalasa, Andhra Pradesh, India. His parents were Barnabas and Santhosamma. His parents converted to Christianity in 1966, and Paul became a Christian in March 1971, at age eight. Paul stated that he traveled with his evangelist father to hundreds of villages in India sharing the gospel and, at age 19, he entered full-time ministry.

He passed the Intermediate examination in 1981 and withdrew from his Bachelor of Arts degree from Anakapalli Merchants’ Association Lingamurthy (AMAL) College, Anakapalli, in his second year of studies. Paul was granted honorary degree from Living Word Bible College in Swan River, Manitoba, Canada, accredited through Transworld Accrediting Commission International, which is featured in GetEducated's "List of accreditation agencies used by fake colleges".

== Controversies ==
Paul has travelled to many countries and met numerous world leaders in his role as a Christian evangelist. Paul was the religious leader of convicted war criminal and former President of Liberia Charles Taylor. A month prior to Charles' resignation, in an interview with Somini Sengupta and Laurie Goodstein of The New York Times, Charles offered to step down after holding prayers in the presence of Paul. In 2006, Paul authored the book Al-Qaeda Winning–America Losing. Paul met Dennis Hastert, pretending to be a supporter. Paul later claimed that he had urged Hastert to resign which was refuted by Hastert's spokesperson.

In an article in The New Republic, Michelle Cottle compared him with Billy Graham and Jimmy Carter, writing that "Focused as he is on Third World hunger and other apolitical issues that don’t get you on “Crossfire,” Dr. Paul simply may never fit the American image of a Spiritual Leader. But such challenges simply make the indefatigable peace crusader even more determined to try." The same article in The New Republic, states that "By all accounts, Dr. Paul’s overseas peace rallies are sights to behold. Most take place in Africa or India, where villagers stream in from around the countryside to see, as one Indian paper put it, “the mesmerizing evangelist,” who has become a minor celebrity across much of both continents. A “small” rally is defined as an audience of 10,000 or 20,000. Large rallies stretch upward of a million. Arkansas Governor Mike Huckabee, who traveled to India with Paul in January 2002, stated "But there were maybe seventy-five thousand, a hundred thousand," Huckabee says of the rally he attended. "I'm not sure I ever saw that many people except at a major football game."

In 2005, the Evangelical Council for Financial Accountability terminated the membership of Paul's organization, Gospel to the Unreached Millions, for failing to meet financial accountability and governance standards.

=== Global Peace One ===
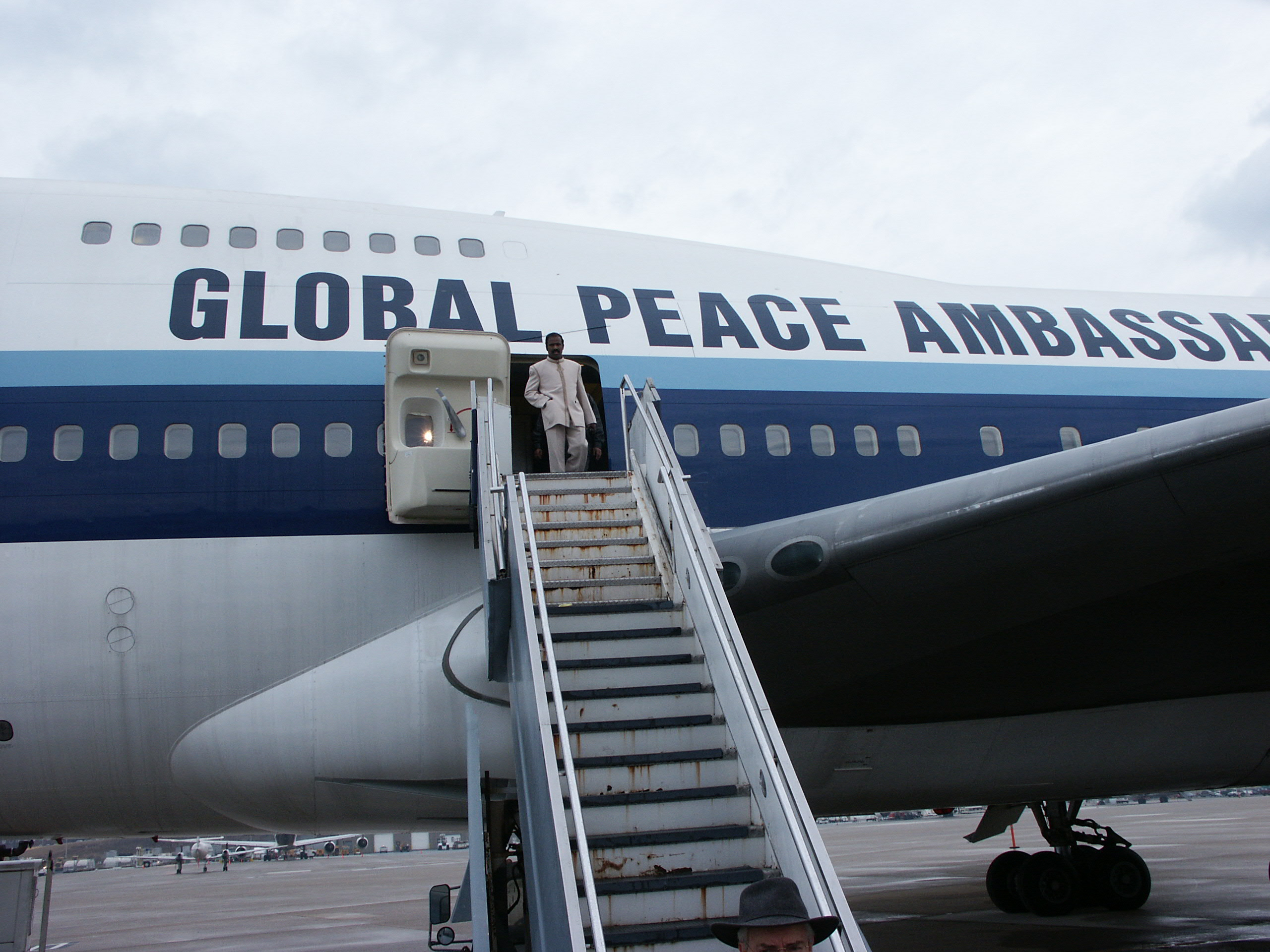
Paul walking off Global Peace One on 2 March 2004, on a humanitarian mission to Haiti

Through charitable contributions to his organization, Paul's backers provided funds to purchase a Boeing 747SP airplane that Paul named "Global Peace Ambassadors", which flew under the name "Global Peace One". The airplane was formerly flown by China Airlines; it was the aircraft in the China Airlines Flight 006 accident. The airplane was used for missions to Third World countries, delivering disaster aid. A former crew member described it as a "flying death trap". The volunteer pilot, first officer, and flight engineer all quit in 2010 because of concerns over maintenance and non-payment of debts. The FAA eventually suspended the plane's operating certificate due to insufficient maintenance. The aircraft is parked at Tijuana International Airport in Tijuana, Baja California, and is reported to be in poor condition. The airplane's registration N4522V was cancelled by the Federal Aviation Administration on March 14, 2018 due to expiration.

== Personal life ==
Paul has three children with his wife Mary Kilari. His mother died while undergoing treatment in Visakhapatnam on 12 Feb 2019.

A civil dispute is ongoing between Paul and his brother's wife Kilari Esther Rani (on behalf of Gospel to the Unreached Million Society and The Ancient Pattern Pentecostal Church Society) over the management of properties of these two societies. In an appeal proceedings related this dispute in the Andhra Pradesh High Court, Justice Ravi Nath Tilhari directed him to appoint an advocate to represent him after he referred to a Judge as "mad" while appearing as a Party in person. Despite the warning in the previous hearing, he filed a fresh application seeking to quash the previous orders issued to him which directed him to utilise the services of an advocate. The Judge threatened to initiate Contempt of court proceedings against him if he again appeared in person in the case.

== Court Cases ==
In a defamation suit (CS (OS) 1161 of 2007) filed in the Delhi High Court, Paul accused senior Indian National Congress political leaders Natwar Singh, Y. S. Rajasekhara Reddy and Pranab Mukherjee of defamation and preventing a five nation "Global Peace Tour" led by former Prime Minister of India H. D. Deve Gowda that he had organised to advocate for a permanent seat for India in the United Nations Security Council. Paul accused former Chief minister of Andhra Pradesh Y. S. Rajasekhara Reddy of seeking a $5 million bribe towards electoral expenses in the presence of then Minister of Housing Botsa Satyanarayana. He further claimed that YSR had prevented Sonia Gandhi from visiting an orphanage that he was running. Y. S. Rajasekhara Reddy was also accused by opposition party leaders of using state resources to promote his daughter Y. S. Sharmila's husband and evangelist Anil Kumar in a bid to counter and suppress Paul. Paul launched the Praja Shanti Party in the midst of his spat with Y. S. Rajasekhara Reddy. He stated, "The purpose of starting the Praja Shanti Party is to redeem people from slavery, promote equality among all people and all faiths and all castes and establish true democracy."

Paul said in January 2019 that his party would contest the 2019 elections in Andhra Pradesh. His party's slogan was "Save Secular India". He stated that both central and state governments reneged on their election promises and deceived the people. He contested unsuccessfully from Narasapuram as a Lok Sabha candidate for 2019, securing 3,037 votes out of 1,325,028 cast. His nomination for 2019 Bhimavaram Assembly constituency was rejected by the returning officer as he reached the place after the deadline.

In 2022, he was attacked at Jakkapur village bordering Siddipet Assembly constituency and Sircilla Assembly constituency by Bharat Rashtra Samithi activists while he was enroute to Sircilla to meet farmers who had incurred losses due to sudden rainfall. A case of cheating was booked against him for collecting money in exchange for nominating a person on behalf of his party for the Lal Bahadur Nagar Assembly constituency in the 2023 Telangana Legislative Assembly election. However, different newspapers have reported different monetary values in the case. He contested unsuccessfully from Visakhapatnam as a Lok Sabha candidate for 2024, securing 7,529 votes out of 1,366,795 cast with Mathukumilli Bharat emerging victorious.

In the United States, Paul backed Barack Obama in the 2008 presidential election due to Obama's opposition to the War in Iraq. Paul then endorsed Donald Trump in the 2016 presidential election.
