= Kadubandi Srinivasa Rao =

Indian politician

Kadubandi Srinivasa Rao (born 1966) is an Indian politician from Andhra Pradesh. He is the MLA from Srungavarapukota Assembly Constituency from 2019 to 2024.

== Early life and education ==
Rai hails from Gutchimi village in Dattirajeru mandalam, Vizianagaram district. His father is Ramu Naidu. He did his schooling in Zilla Parishad High School, Maradam village, Dattirajeru block, Viziangaram district in 1981 and after his intermediate (plus two) from MR College Vizianagaram, he did his B.Tech. from J.N.T.U. Kakinada in 1988. Later, he did M.Tech. from the University of Texas, US in 1993 and his M.S. in 1996. He married Sri Madhu, a doctor. He runs a software business. He belongs to Koppula Velama community and the constituency has a sizeable population of Velama community members.

== Career ==
Rao contested in 2009 on Praja Rajyam Party but lost the Gajapathinagaram seat in Vizianagaram district. He shifted to YSR Congress Party and contested the 2014 Andhra Pradesh Legislative Assembly Election on YSRCP ticket from Gajapathinagaram Assembly Constituency but lost again. However, he won the 2019 Andhra Pradesh Legislative Assembly Election as a YSR Congress Party candidate from Srungavarapukota constituency in Vizianagaram district. He defeated Kolla Lalitha Kumari of Telugu Desam Party by a margin of 11,365.
