= Palla Srinivasa Rao =

Indian politician

3rd President of the Telugu Desam Party, Andhra Pradesh
- Incumbent
- Assumed office 14 June 2024
- National President: N. Chandrababu Naidu
- Preceded by: Kinjarapu Atchannaidu

Member of the Andhra Pradesh Legislative Assembly
- Incumbent
- Assumed office 2024
- Preceded by: Tippala Nagi Reddy
- Constituency: Gajuwaka
- In office 2014–2019
- Preceded by: Chintalapudi Venkatramaiah
- Succeeded by: Tippala Nagireddy
- Constituency: Gajuwaka

Personal details
- Party: Telugu Desam Party
- Spouse(s): Smt. Lavanya Devi (Assistant Professor, Andhra University)
- Children: 1 Daughter, 1 Son
- Website: www.pallasrinivas.com

Palla Srinivasa Rao Yadav is an Indian politician. He was elected as the Member of the Legislative Assembly (MLA) to the Andhra Pradesh Legislative Assembly from Gajuwaka on behalf of Telugu Desam Party in 2014 and in 2024. He won with highest majority in the state in the 2024 Andhra Pradesh Legislative Assembly election with 95,235 votes.

On 14 June 2024 he was appointed the Andhra Pradesh State President of the Telugu Desam Party by the National President of Telugu Desam Party Shri. N. Chandrababu Naidu.

== Education Details ==
Shri Palla Srinivasa Rao completed Post Graduate MBA in 1995 and completed Master of Technology in Structural Engineering In 1998 from Andhra University, Visakhapatnam, Andhra Pradesh.

== Political career ==
He hailed from a political family. In 1994 general elections, his father Palla Simhachalam was MLA from Vizag-2 from Telugu Desam Party.

In 2009 elections, Palla Srinivas contested as the Praja Rajyam Party's MP candidate for Vizag and lost by narrow margin.

Subsequently, he joined TDP and contested from Gajuwaka in the 2014 election. He won with a huge majority and worked for the development of his constituency.

He lost the 2019 elections from the same constituency, which due to votes splitting as Janasena's chief Pawan Kalyan too contested from the same constituency.

After 2019 elections, TDP appointed him as Visakhapatnam Parliament President.

He continued to work for strengthening the party and building the cadre in the Vizag city.

His outstanding efforts paid off in the 2024 elections, when he won in assembly election with a majority of 95,235 votes.
