= China Airlines Flight 006 =

1985 aviation accident over the Pacific Ocean

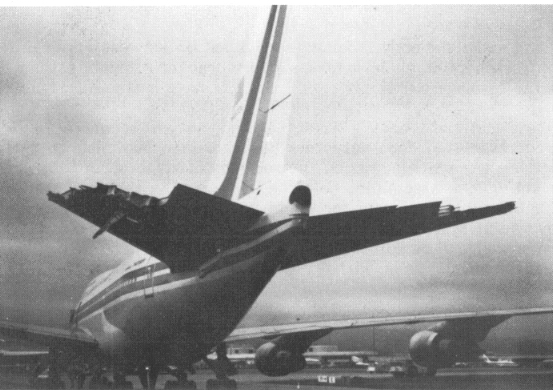
- Damage to the aircraft's horizontal stabilizers

Accident
- Date: February 19, 1985
- Summary: Engine failure leading to spatial disorientation, followed by in-flight upset
- Site: Pacific Ocean, near San Francisco, California, United States

Aircraft
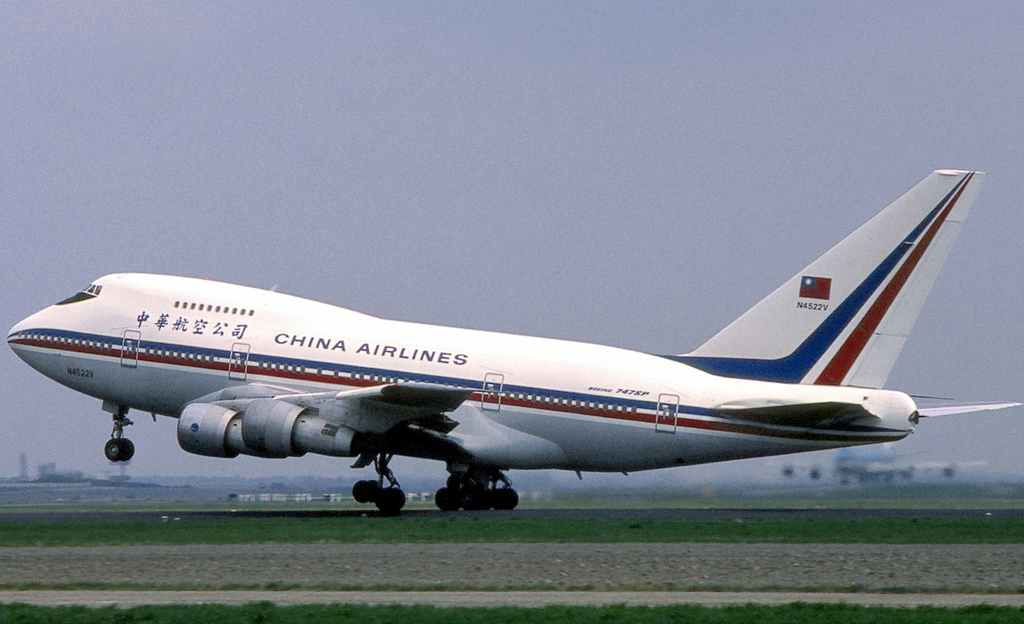
- N4522V, the aircraft involved in the accident, seen in May 1984
- Aircraft type: Boeing 747SP-09
- Operator: China Airlines
- IATA flight No.: CI006
- ICAO flight No.: CAL006
- Call sign: DYNASTY 006
- Registration: N4522V
- Flight origin: Chiang Kai-Shek International Airport, Taipei, Taoyuan, Taiwan
- Destination: Los Angeles International Airport, Los Angeles, California, United States
- Occupants: 274
- Passengers: 251
- Crew: 23
- Fatalities: 0
- Injuries: 24
- Survivors: 274

China Airlines Flight 006 was a daily non-stop international passenger flight from Taipei to Los Angeles International Airport. On February 19, 1985, the Boeing 747SP operating the flight was involved in an aircraft upset accident, following the failure of the No. 4 engine, while cruising at 41,000 feet (12,500 m). The plane rolled over and plunged 31,500 feet (9,600 m), experiencing high speeds and g-forces (as high as 5 g) before the captain was able to recover from the dive, and then after noting damage, diverted to San Francisco International Airport. Twenty-four occupants were injured, two of them seriously.

== Accident ==
The aircraft had departed from Taipei at 16:22 Taiwan Standard Time. The accident occurred 10 hours into the flight. The Boeing 747SP-09 was 350 miles (300 nmi; 560 km) northwest of San Francisco, cruising at an altitude of 41,000 feet (12,500 m). The cockpit crew consisted of Captain Min-Yuan Ho, age 55; (Note: Chinese: 何敏源; pinyin: Hé Mǐnyuán) First Officer Ju-Yu Chang, age 53; (Note: traditional Chinese: 張如友; simplified Chinese: 张如友; pinyin: Zhāng rúyǒu) Flight Engineer Kuo-Pin Wei, age 55; (Note: traditional Chinese: 衛國斌; simplified Chinese: 卫国斌; pinyin: Wèi Guóbīn) Relief Captain Chien-Yuan Liao, age 53; (Note: Chinese: 廖健元; pinyin: Liào Jiànyuán) and Relief Flight Engineer Po-Chae Su, age 41. (Note: traditional Chinese: 蘇博照; simplified Chinese: 苏博照; pinyin: Sū Bózhào) The captain had approximately 15,500 flight hours, including 3,748 hours on the Boeing 747. The first officer had more than 7,700 hours with 4,553 of them on the Boeing 747, and the flight engineer had approximately 15,500 hours of flight time, including 4,363 hours on the Boeing 747. The accident occurred while the main crew was on duty.

The sequence began with a loss of thrust in the No. 4 engine. That engine had failed twice during previous flights (while cruising at 41,000 ft and 43,000 ft). In each of those cases, the engine was restarted after descending to a lower altitude. The maintenance response to the logbook entries that noted the attempted solutions included engine inspection; fuel filter drainage and replacement; vane controller inspection and replacement; water drainage from Mach probes; and other filter replacements. None of these fixed the recurrent problem with the No. 4 engine.

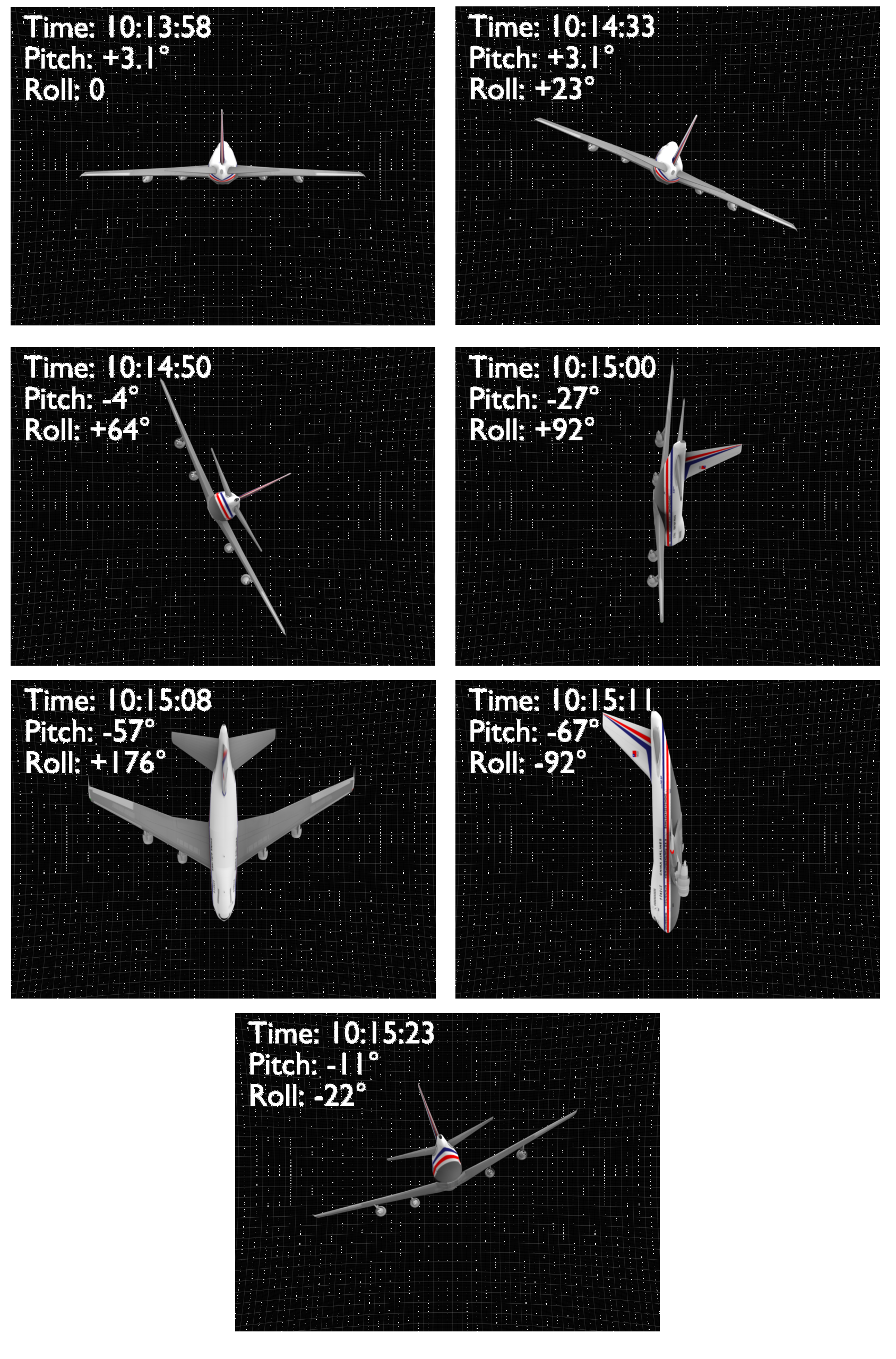
Aircraft roll and pitch attitudes and time

The flight engineer attempted to restore power to the engine but did not close the bleed valve as required by the checklist procedure. After the flight engineer announced the engine had flamed out, the captain instructed him to restart it and ordered the first officer to request clearance for a descent from 41,000 feet (12,500 m). According to the flight manual, engine restart is unlikely to succeed above 30,000 feet (9,000 m).

During this sequence of events, the aircraft was on autopilot, the airspeed slowly decreased. The autopilot slowly applied more aileron to keep the wings level until the maximum limit of 23 degrees was reached. As the speed decreased further, the aircraft began to roll to the right even though the autopilot was maintaining maximum left roll input and the nose started to drop.

By the time the captain disconnected the autopilot the aircraft had rolled over 60 degrees to the right and the nose had dropped. Ailerons and flight spoilers were the only means available to the autopilot to keep the wings level as the autopilot does not control the rudder during cruise flight. To counteract the asymmetrical forces created by the loss of thrust from the No. 4 engine, it was essential for the pilot to manually use the left foot pedal to push the rudder to the left. However, the captain failed to use any rudder inputs at all, before or after disconnecting the autopilot.

As the aircraft descended through clouds, the captain's attention was drawn to the attitude indicator, which displayed excessive bank and pitch indications. Because such an attitude is highly irregular, the captain incorrectly assumed the indicators to be faulty. Without any visual reference because of cloud cover and having rejected the information from the attitude indicators, the captain and first officer became spatially disoriented.

Only after breaking through the bottom of the clouds at 11,000 feet (3,400 m) was the captain able to reorient himself and bring the aircraft under control, leveling out at 9,500 feet (2,900 m). The aircraft had descended 31,500 feet (9,600 m) in under two-and-a-half minutes, while all onboard experienced g-forces as high as 5 g. At that point, the crew believed that all four engines had flamed out, but the National Transportation Safety Board found that only engine No. 4 had failed.

After leveling out, the three remaining engines continued supplying normal thrust. Another restart attempt brought engine No. 4 back into use. The aircraft began climbing. The crew reported "condition normal now" to air traffic control, along with the intention of continuing on to Los Angeles. They then noticed that the inboard main landing gear was down and one of the hydraulic systems was empty. With the drag added by the deployed landing gear the aircraft had insufficient fuel to reach Los Angeles. An emergency was declared and the aircraft diverted to San Francisco International Airport.

== Aftermath ==
There were two serious injuries on board: a fracture and laceration of a foot, and an acute back strain requiring two days of hospitalization. The aircraft was significantly damaged by the excessive g-forces. The wings were permanently bent upwards by 2 inches (5 cm), the inboard main landing gear lost two actuator doors, and the two inboard main gear struts were left dangling. Most affected was the tail, where large outer parts of the horizontal stabilizer had been ripped off. The entire left outboard elevator had been lost along with its actuator, which had been powered by the hydraulic system that ruptured and drained. After repairs were made to the plane, it returned to flight status on April 25, 1985.

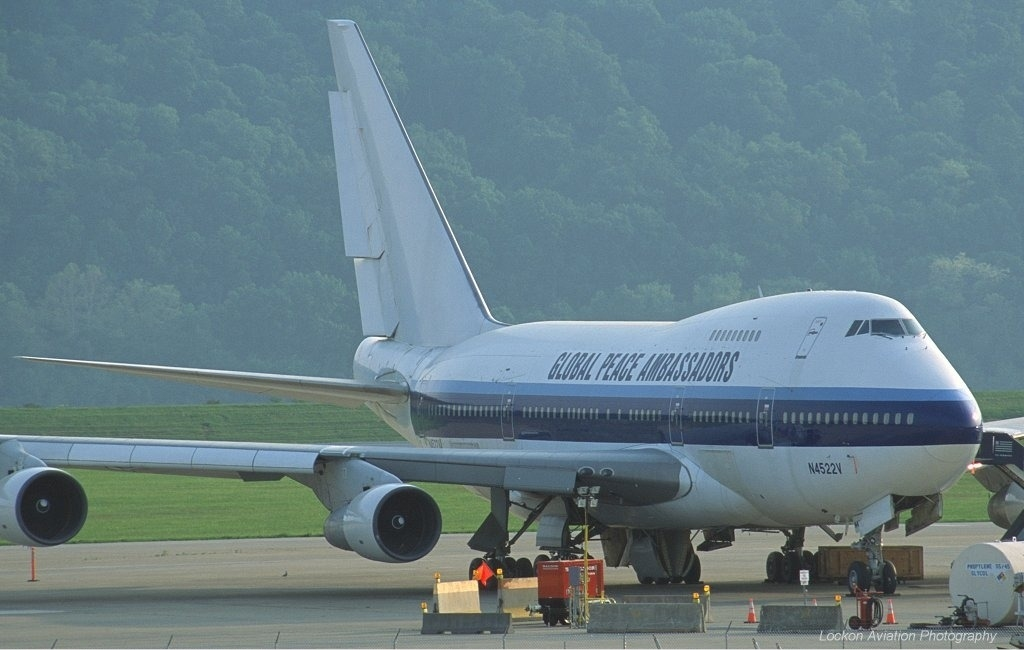
N4522V when owned by Global Peace Initiative in May 2003

The final report of the National Transportation Safety Board (NTSB), issued on March 29, 1986, stated:

The Safety Board can only conclude that the captain was distracted first by the evaluation of the engine malfunction and second by his attempts to arrest the decreasing airspeed, and that, because of these distractions, he was unable to assess properly and promptly the approaching loss of airplane control. The Safety Board also concluded that the captain over-relied on the autopilot and that this was also causal to the accident since the autopilot effectively masked the approaching onset of the loss of control of the airplane.

The NTSB did not make any recommendations in their report.

The plane involved, registration N4522V, remained in service for nearly 12 years until it was leased to China Airlines' sister company, Mandarin Airlines, in January 1997, and was in daily service for the remainder of that year before it was withdrawn from service and placed in a boneyard in Nevada. In April 2002, the aircraft was acquired by Indian evangelist and humanitarian K. A. Paul, and dubbed "Global Peace One". Beginning in February 2004, the aircraft was used to deliver disaster aid to countries such as Ethiopia, India, Iran, and Jordan; however, by July 2005, the FAA had revoked Global Peace Ambassadors' operating certificate due to poor maintenance of the aircraft, effectively grounding it at Thunder Bay Airport in Ontario, Canada. In December 2005, a ferry permit was issued and N4522V was flown to Tijuana International Airport, where the aircraft remained parked as of 2024 with the possibility of it being scrapped.

China Airlines continued operating one of its scheduled Taipei–Los Angeles services as Dynasty 006 until 2018, utilizing the Boeing 747-400 until late 2014, when the Boeing 777-300ER replaced it. In March 2018, due to fleet shortage and financial stress, the flight number was retired and replaced by Flight 008; however, the use of flight number 006 was resumed in June 2019 after the increased requirement of more Taipei–Los Angeles flights, and the use of flight number 006 was retired again in December 2025 and replaced by flight number 008.

== In popular culture ==
- The Discovery Channel Canada / National Geographic Channel TV series Mayday (also called Air Crash Investigation or Air Emergency) dramatized the accident in a 2007 episode titled Panic over the Pacific.
- The flight was documented on an episode of The Weather Channel television program Why Planes Crash titled "Who's Flying".
