= Srungavarapukota Assembly constituency =

Constituency of the Andhra Pradesh Legislative Assembly, India

Coordinates: 18.11°N 83.14°E

Srungavarapukota
- Constituency No. 19 for the Andhra Pradesh Legislative Assembly
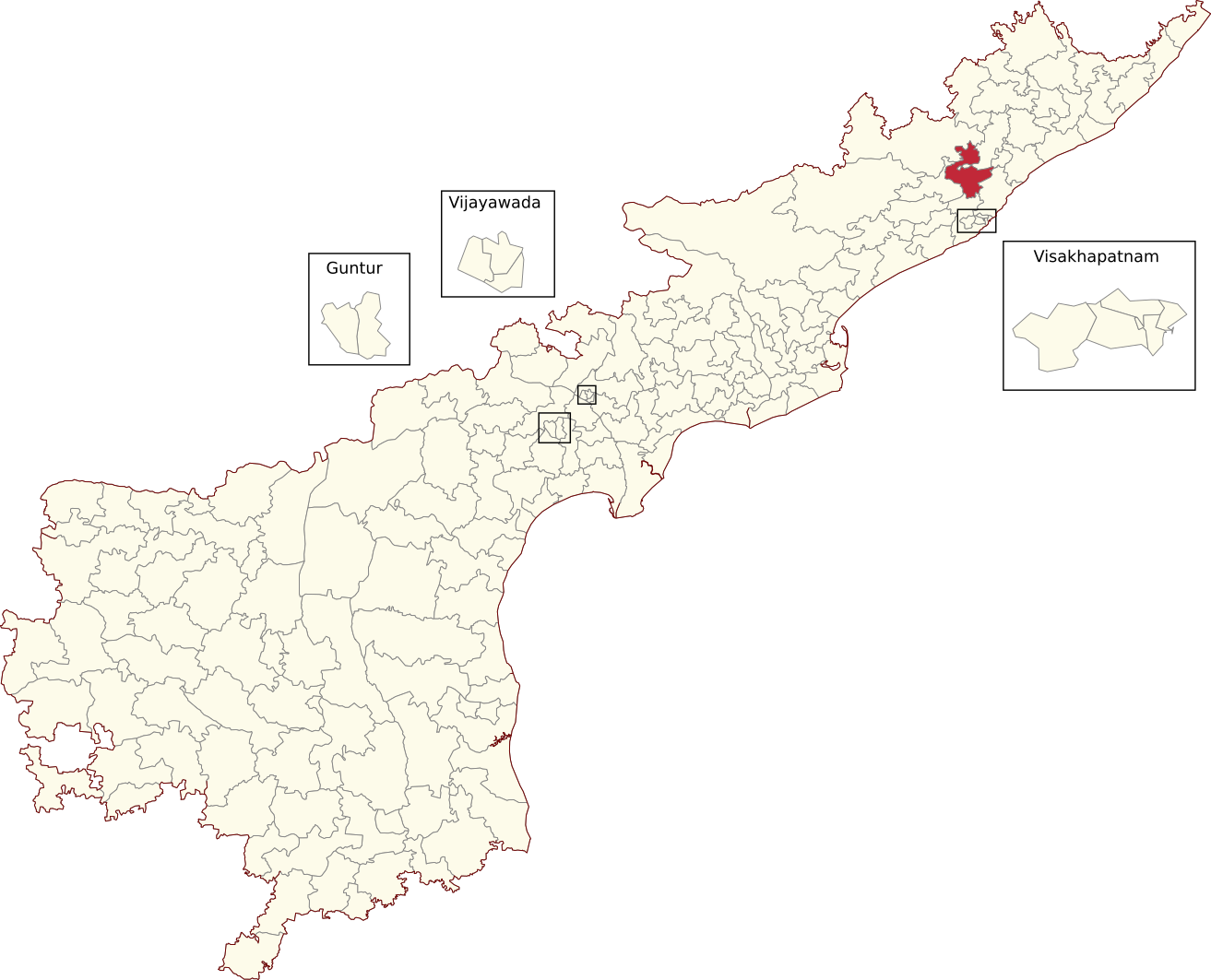
- Location of Srungavarapukota Assembly constituency within Andhra Pradesh

Constituency details
- Country: India
- Region: South India
- State: Andhra Pradesh
- District: Vizianagaram
- Lok Sabha constituency: Visakhapatnam
- Established: 1951
- Total electors: 212,623
- Reservation: None

Member of Legislative Assembly
- 16th Andhra Pradesh Legislative Assembly
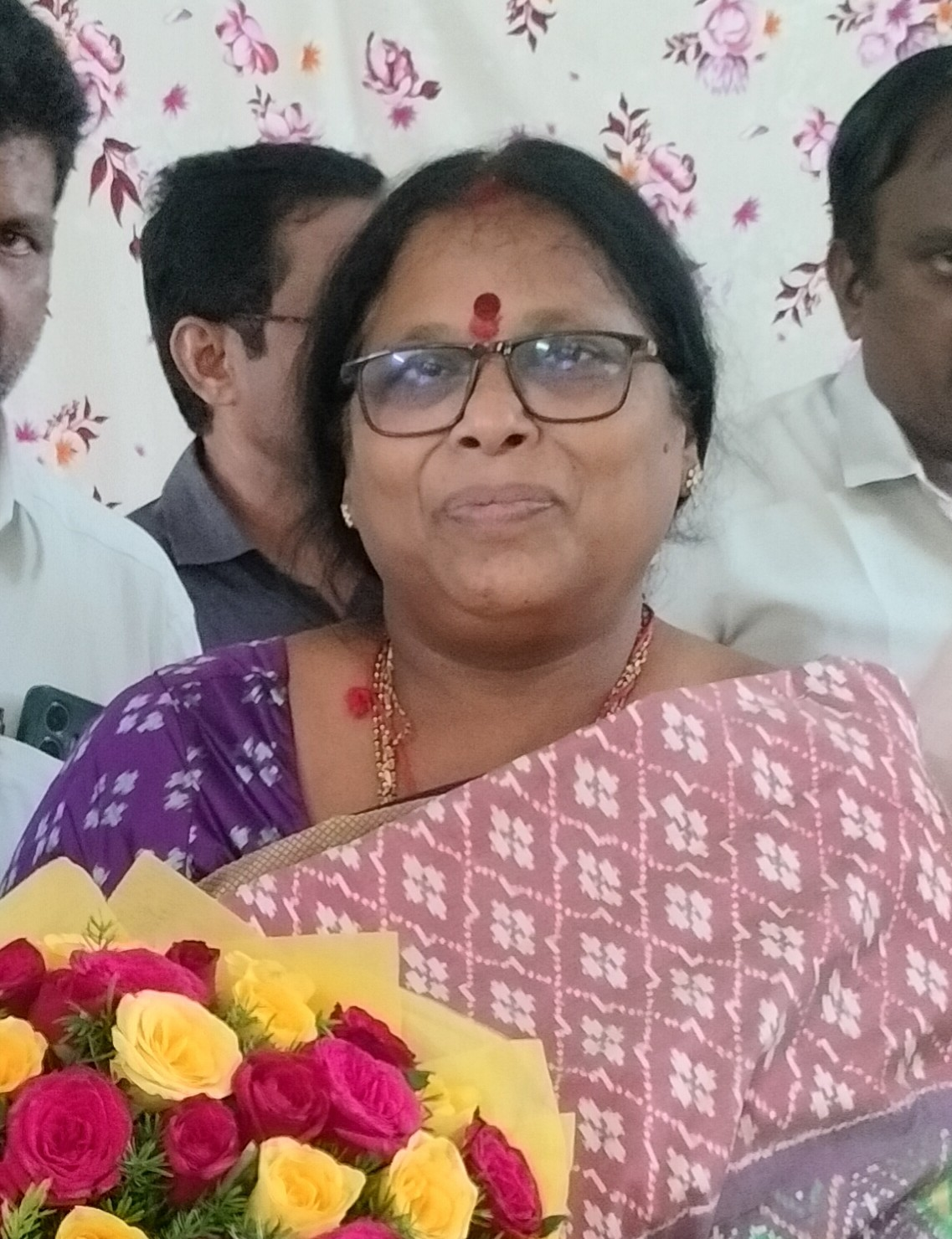
- Incumbent Kolla Lalitha Kumari
- Party: TDP
- Elected year: 2024

Srungavarapukota Assembly constituency is a constituency in Vizianagaram district of Andhra Pradesh that elects representatives to the Andhra Pradesh Legislative Assembly in India. It is one of the seven assembly segments of Visakhapatnam Lok Sabha constituency.

Kolla Lalitha Kumari is the current MLA of the constituency, having won the 2024 Andhra Pradesh Legislative Assembly election from Telugu Desam Party. As of 2019, there are a total of 212,623 electors in the constituency. The constituency was established in 1951, as per the Delimitation Orders (1951). This assembly is currently part of Vizinagaram. There are ongoing requests from people of Vepada mandal to include this in Vizag.

== Mandals ==
The five mandals that form the assembly constituency are:

Mandal
Srungavarapukota
Lakkavarapukota
Kothavalasa
Vepada
Jami

== Members of the Legislative Assembly ==
Year	Member	Political party
1952	C. V. Somayajulu	Socialist Party
1955	Chaganti Venkata Somayajulu	Praja Socialist Party
1957*	Gujjala Dharam Naidu	Indian National Congress
1962	Gujjala Dharam Naidu	Indian National Congress
1967	Kolla Appala Naidu	Independent
1972	Kakaralapudi V R S P Raju	Indian National Congress
1978	Sanyasidora Duru	Indian National Congress (I)
1983	Dukku Labudu Bariki	Telugu Desam Party
1985	Dukku Labudu Bariki	Telugu Desam Party
1989	Dukku Labudu Bariki	Telugu Desam Party
1994	Dukku Labudu Bariki	Telugu Desam Party
1999	Hymavathi Devi Sobha	Telugu Desam Party
2004	Kumbha Ravibabu	Indian National Congress
2009	Kolla Lalitha Kumari	Telugu Desam Party
2014	Kolla Lalitha Kumari	Telugu Desam Party
2019	Kadubandi Srinivasa Rao	YSR Congress Party
2024	Kolla Lalitha Kumari	Telugu Desam Party

== Election results ==
=== 2024 ===
2024 Andhra Pradesh Legislative Assembly election: Srungavarapukota
Party	Candidate	Votes	%	±%
TDP	Kolla Lalitha Kumari	1,11,026	58.36	
YSRCP	Kadubandi Srinivasa Rao	72,236	37.97	
INC	Gedela Tirupati	1918	1.01	
Majority		38,790	20.38	
Turnout		1,90,254		
TDP gain from YSRCP		Swing		

=== 2019 ===
2019 Andhra Pradesh Legislative Assembly election: Srungavarapukota
Party	Candidate	Votes	%	±%
YSRCP	Kadubandi Srinivasa Rao	91,451	49.73	
TDP	Kolla Lalitha Kumari	80,086	43.55	
CPI	P. Kameshwararao	3,116	1.71	
Majority		11,365	6.18	
Turnout		1,83,901	86.49	+1.40
YSRCP gain from TDP		Swing		

=== 2014 ===
2014 Andhra Pradesh Legislative Assembly election: Srungavarapukota
Party	Candidate	Votes	%	±%
TDP	Kolla Lalitha Kumari	82,142	47.73	
YSRCP	Rongali Jagannadham	53,605	31.15	
INC	Indukuri Raghu Raju	30,696	17.83	
Majority		28,537	16.58	
Turnout		172,112	85.10	+2.33
TDP hold		Swing		

=== 2009 ===
2009 Andhra Pradesh Legislative Assembly election: Srungavarapukota
Party	Candidate	Votes	%	±%
TDP	Kolla Lalitha Kumari	40,142	25.51	−19.26
INC	Allu Kesava Venkata Joginaidu	36,702	23.33	−26.76
Independent	Indukuri Raghu Raju	31,248	19.86	
Independent	Valluri Jayaprakash Babu	20,284	12.89	
PRP	Gorle Maheswararao	19,330	12.29	
Majority		3,440	2.18	
Turnout		157,337	82.77	+8.60
TDP gain from INC		Swing		

=== 1999 ===
1999 Andhra Pradesh Legislative Assembly election: Srungavarapukota
Party	Candidate	Votes	%	±%
TDP	Hymavathi Sobha	46,204	47.0	▼10.7
INC	Setti Ganghadharaswami	45,526	46.3	▲7.8
Anna Telugu Desam Party	Dukku Bariki	6,393	6.5	
NTRTDP(LP)	Sobha Appalaswami	274	0.3	
Majority		678	0.7	▼18.1
Turnout		102,101	71.8	▲1.3
TDP hold		Swing		

=== 1994 ===
1994 Andhra Pradesh Legislative Assembly election: Srungavarapukota
Party	Candidate	Votes	%	±%
TDP	Dukku Labudu Bariki	57,369	57.7	▲3.8
INC	Setti Gangadhara	38,289	38.5	▼7.6
BJP	Veeranna Ketha	3,493	3.5	
Independent	Sagiri Rao	287	0.3	
Majority		19,080	18.8	▲11.4
Turnout		101,685	70.5	▲4
TDP hold		Swing		

=== 1989 ===
1989 Andhra Pradesh Legislative Assembly election: Srungavarapukota
Party	Candidate	Votes	%	±%
TDP	Dukku Labudu Bariki	46,719	53.9	▼19.6
INC	Sagiri Rao	39,973	46.1	▲19.6
Majority		6,746	7.4	▼38.5
Turnout		91,181	66.5	▲12.1
TDP hold		Swing		

=== 1985 ===
1985 Andhra Pradesh Legislative Assembly election: Srungavarapukota
Party	Candidate	Votes	%	±%
TDP	Dukku Labudu Bariki	44,358	73.5	▲12.4
INC	Gangannadora Duru	15,973	26.5	▲6.1
Majority		28,385	45.9	▲5.9
Turnout		61,836	54.4	▼9.7
TDP hold		Swing		

=== 1983 ===
1983 Andhra Pradesh Legislative Assembly election: Srungavarapukota
Party	Candidate	Votes	%	±%
TDP	Dukku Labudu Bariki	40,788	61.1	
INC	Ganganna Dora Vannepuri	13,603	20.4	▼16.2
Independent	Duru Sanyasidora	12,317	18.5	▼18.1
Majority		27,185	40.0	▲31.3
Turnout		68,033	64.1	▲1.9
TDP gain from INC(I)		Swing		

=== 1978 ===
1978 Andhra Pradesh Legislative Assembly election: Srungavarapukota
Party	Candidate	Votes	%	±%
INC(I)	Sanyasidora Duru	21,927	36.6	
Independent	Balaraju Pujari	16,564	27.7	
JP	Mutyalu Janni	12,170	20.3	
INC	Gujala Dharma Naidu	7,373	12.3	
Independent	Duvvapu Thowdu	1,874	3.1	
Majority		5,363	8.7	▼14.86
Turnout		61,958	62.2	▼9.84
INC(I) gain from INC		Swing		

=== 1972 ===
1972 Andhra Pradesh Legislative Assembly election: Srungavarapukota
Party	Candidate	Votes	%	±%
INC	Kakaralapudi V R S P Raju	36,446	61.78	▲29.51
Independent	Kolla Naidu	22,546	38.22	
Majority		13,900	23.56	▲18.43
Turnout		58,992	72.04	▲0.61
INC gain from Independent		Swing		

=== 1967 ===
1967 Andhra Pradesh Legislative Assembly election: Srungavarapukota
Party	Candidate	Votes	%	±%
Independent	Kolla Appala Naidu	18,754	37.40	▲3.8
INC	K.V.S Padmanabha	16,182	32.27	▼48.61
SWA	C. Kilaparthi	11,066	22.07	▲2.96
CPI	R. Mazumdar	4,139	8.25	
Majority		2,572	5.13	▼56.64
Turnout		50,141	71.43	
Independent gain from INC		Swing		

=== 1962 ===
1962 Andhra Pradesh Legislative Assembly election: Srungavarapukota
Party	Candidate	Votes	%	±%
INC	Gujjala Dharam Naidu	11,659	80.88	▲60.47
SWA	Tumirelli Ramulu	2,755	19.11	
Majority		8,904	61.77	▲29.69
Turnout		14,414		
INC hold		Swing		

=== 1955 ===
1955 Andhra State Legislative Assembly election: Srungavarapukota
Party	Candidate	Votes	%	±%
PSP	Chaganti Venkata Somayajulu	19,771	26.03	▼33.63
PSP	Gujjala Naidu	18,887	24.87	
Independent	Gorrepati Rao	14,292	18.82	
INC	Kandarapa Venkataramesam	8,469	11.15	
INC	Kankipati Veerannapadal	7,036	9.26	
Independent	Nanigiri Pydithalli	3,876	5.10	
CPI	Avagadda Chandrarao	3,617	4.76	
Majority		24,366	32.8	▼8.51
Turnout		75,948	68.27	▲29.86
PSP hold		Swing		

=== 1952 ===
1952 Madras State Legislative Assembly election: Srungavarapukota
Party	Candidate	Votes	%	±%
Socialist Party (India)	C. V. Somayajulu	17,451	59.66%	
INC	T. Venkataramanayya	5,577	19.07%	19.07%
KMPP	Allu Joginaiudu	4,550	15.55%	
Independent	V. Sriramamurthy	1,674	5.72%	
Margin of victory		11,874	40.59%	
Turnout		29,252	38.41%	
Registered electors		76,151		
Socialist Party (India) win (new seat)				

== See also ==
- List of constituencies of the Andhra Pradesh Legislative Assembly
