= M. V. V. S. Murthi =

Indian politician

Mathukumilli Veera Venkata Satyanarayana Murthi (3 July 1938 – 2 October 2018) was an Indian politician, businessperson and teacher. He was the founder of Gandhi Institute of Technology and Management.

== Early life and death ==
Murthi was born on 3 July 1938, in Moolapalem, Sanapalli Lanka. He earned a doctorate in economics from Andhra University. He died on 1 October 2018, near Cantwell, Alaska in a traffic collision while travelling on the George Parks Highway. A state funeral was held on 7 October 2018, beside GITAM Visakhapatnam.

== Career ==
He owned a soft drink bottling company and established the Gandhi Institute of Technology and Management in 1980. In 1983, he joined the Telugu Desam Party, and from 1987 to 1989 led the Visakhapatnam Urban Development Authority. Murthi left the position to contest the Lok Sabha elections, but lost. He was seated to the parliament from the constituency of Visakhapatnam in 1991, stepping down at the end of his term in 1996. Murthi returned to the Lok Sabha in 1999, serving until 2004. In 2014, Murthi was elected to the Andhra Pradesh Legislative Council.

He was believed to be close to Chandrababu Naidu and his family members. His grandson, Sribharat Mathukumilli, is married to Nandamuri Tejaswini, the younger daughter of Balakrishna.
