= Kolla Lalitha Kumari =

Indian politician

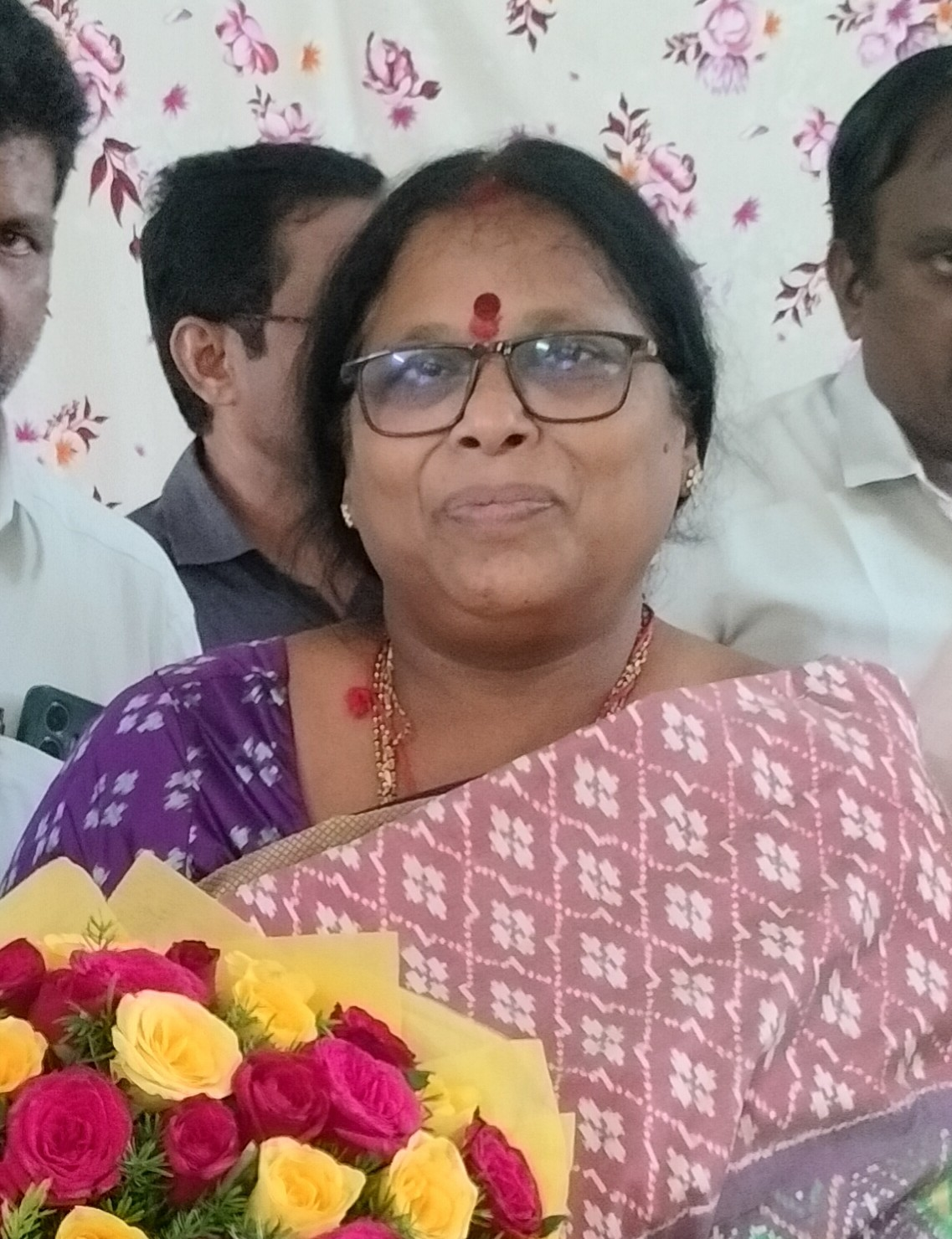

Member of the Andhra Pradesh Legislative Assembly
- Incumbent
- Assumed office 2024
- Preceded by: Kadubandi Srinivasa Rao
- Constituency: Srungavarapukota
- In office 2009–2019
- Preceded by: Kumbha Ravibabu
- Succeeded by: Kadubandi Srinivasa Rao
- Constituency: Srungavarapukota

Personal details
- Born: 1970 (age 55–56)
- Party: Telugu Desam Party

Kolla Lalitha Kumari (born 1970) is an Indian politician from Andhra Pradesh. She served as an MLA for two terms. She won the 2024 Andhra Pradesh Legislative Assembly Election on Telugu Desam Party ticket from Srungavarapukota Assembly constituency.

== Early life and education ==
Kumari hails from Srungavarapukota and belongs to Velama caste. She married Balaji Appala Ramprasad, a farmer. She completed her SSC from Kamala Nehru high school in 1985 and did her intermediate (plus two) at the Government Junior College, Srungavarapukota in 1987.

== Political career ==
Kumari won the 2009 and 2014 Andhra Pradesh Legislative Assembly Elections on Telugu Desam Party ticket from Srungavarapukota Assembly constituency in Vizianagaram district. In 2009, she defeated Allu Kesava Venkata Joginaidu of Indian National Congress by a margin of 3,440 votes. She also won the next term in 2014 assembly election defeating Rongali Jagannadham of YSR Congress Party by 28,572 votes. But she lost the 2019 Andhra Pradesh Legislative Assembly Election from the same constituency to Kadubandi Srinivasa Rao of YSR Congress Party.

In April 2015, she became a board member of Tirumala Tirupati Devasthanam. TTD manages India's richest temple in Tirupati. Kumari was also the State Organising Secretary of TDP at that time.
