= M. V. V. Satyanarayana =

Indian politician and film producer

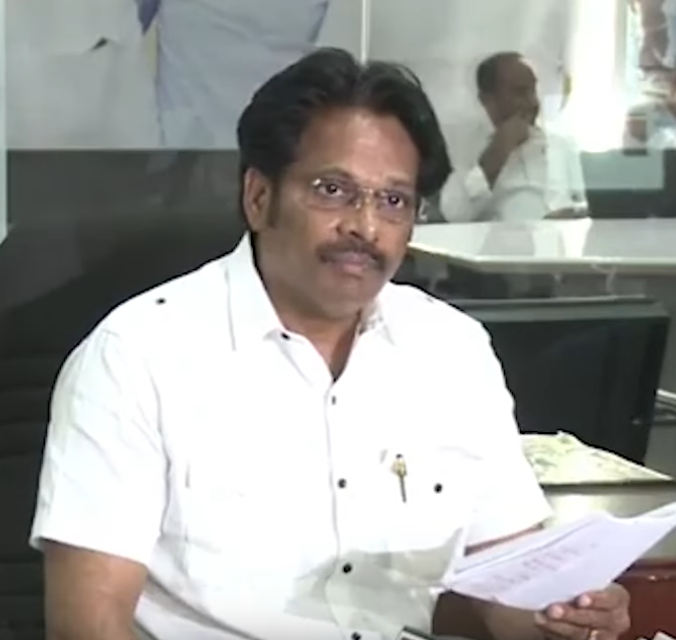

Member of the India Parliament
- In office 23 May 2019 – 4 June 2024
- Preceded by: Kambhampati Hari Babu
- Succeeded by: Mathukumilli Bharat
- Constituency: Visakhapatnam

Personal details
- Born: 25 June 1966 (age 60) Tanuku, Andhra Pradesh, India
- Party: YSR Congress Party
- Spouse: Naga Jyothi
- Children: Sarath Mullapudi

M. V. V. Satyanarayana is an Indian politician and film producer. He founded MVV Cinema film production company. He is a member of the 17th Lok Sabha, representing Visakhapatnam constituency of Andhra Pradesh. He is member of the YSR Congress Party.

== Early life and education ==
Satyanarayana hails from Tanuku, West Godavari district, Andhra Pradesh. His is born to late Raghunayakulu Mullapudi and Paravatha Yardhanamma. He married Naga Jyothi and they have a son, Sarath. He did his graduation from a college affiliated to Andhra University. In June 2021, his wife and son were kidnapped for about 48 hours for ransom but police rescued them. He has a total assets of about Rs. 200 crore as declared to the Election Commission.

== Political career ==
Satyanarayana won from the Visakhapatnam Parliamentary constituency on YSR Congress party ticket by a margin of 4,414 votes. He is nominated again to contest the Visakhapatnam seat on YSRCP in the 2024 general elections.

== Filmography ==
Films
Year	Title	Producer	Actor	Notes
2014	Geethanjali	Yes	No	
2015	Sankarabharanam	Yes	No	
2016	Abhinetri	Yes	No	
2017	Luckunnodu	Yes	Yes	
2018	Neevevaro	Yes	No	
2021	Gully Rowdy	Yes	No	
2024	Masthu Shades Unnai Raa	No	Yes	
2024	Geethanjali Malli Vachindi	Yes	Yes	
