= Velagapudi Ramakrishna Babu =

Indian politician

Member of Legislative Assembly, Andhra Pradesh
- Incumbent
- Assumed office 2009
- Preceded by: Constituency established
- Constituency: Visakhapatnam East

Personal details
- Party: Telugu Desam Party

Velagapudi Ramakrishna Babu (born 1961) is an Indian politician from Andhra Pradesh. He won the 2019 Andhra Pradesh Legislative Assembly election on Telugu Desam Party ticket from Visakhapatnam East constituency in the Visakhapatnam district. He is a four-time MLA from the Visakhapatnam East constituency. He won the 2024 Andhra Pradesh Legislative Assembly election from the same constituency again on TDP ticket.

== Early life and education ==
Babu hails from Vijayawada but shifted to Visakhapatnam in late nineties. He belongs to Kamma community. His father is Brahmeswara Rao. He married Sujana V and has two sons, V. Raja Sai Phanibhusan and V. Raja Sai Pratap Rudra.

== Career ==
Babu's political life started with Telugu Desam Party and he won the MLA seat for the first time from Visakhapatnam in 2009. He won again on TDP ticket in 2014 and retained it in 2019, despite the wave in favour of YSRCP. He won the 2019 Andhra Pradesh Legislative Assembly election defeating Akkaramani Vijaya Nirmala of YSR Congress by a huge margin of 26,474 votes. In 2014, after getting elected, he resigned the MLA seat in protest against the bifurcation of the Andhra Pradesh State.

His 2024 prospects got a boost when his staunch opponent Srinivasa Yadav joined JSP and declared his support to the TDP alliance. In February 2024, he lodged a complaint in the MVP Colony police station, Visakhapatnam, after receiving threats from an unknown caller.
