= Somini Sengupta =

Indian-born American journalist

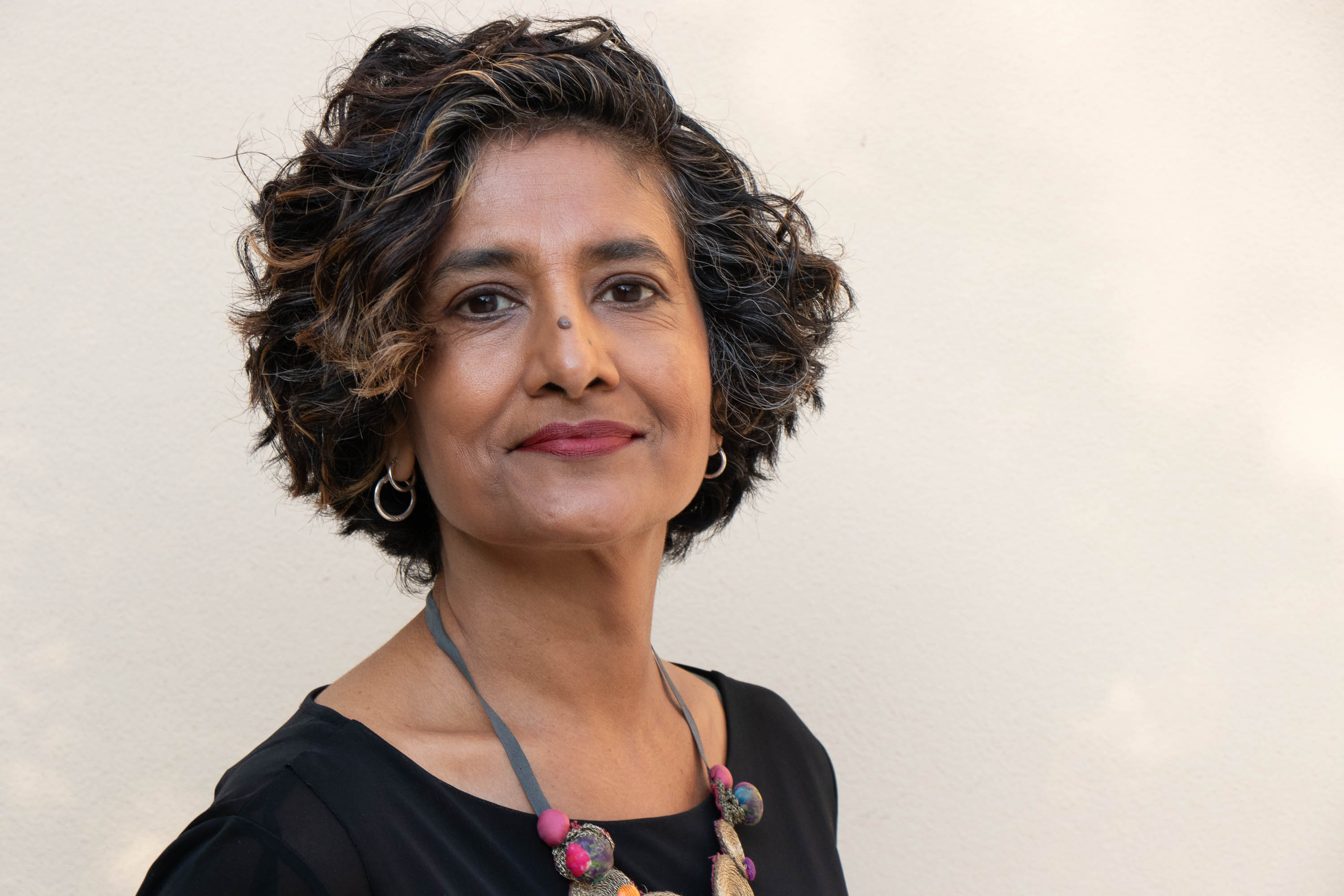
- Born: India
- Education: University of California, Berkeley
- Occupation: Journalist
- Employer: The New York Times

Somini Sengupta has been a New York Times reporter for over 20 years. She has written about conflicts, diplomacy, humanitarian crises and as of 2023 is covering climate. In particular, she has reported on the Iraq War and the Syrian civil war. Her flak jacket is in the Times museum. Since February 2022, she has been the lead writer for the Times Climate Forward newsletter, sharing the National Press Club Journalism Award in 2023 for Newsletter Journalism with fellow reporter Manuela Andreoni.

Born in India, Sengupta was raised in Canada and the United States and graduated from the University of California, Berkeley.

== Career and awards ==
In 2003 and 2004, Somini Sengupta covered west and central Africa as the Dakar bureau chief for The New York Times, including the conflict in Darfur. She won the George Polk Award on "foreign reporting for her articles from Congo, Liberia and other war-torn areas of West Africa" in 2003.

In 2005, Sengupta became the first Indian American to serve as the New Delhi bureau chief for The New York Times.

Her climate reporting has been recognized and has led to several journalism awards. The United Nations Correspondents Association recognized her reporting on West African climate refugees with its 2017 "UNCA Global Prize for coverage of Climate Change". In 2021, she received an award for her environmental reporting from the Newswomen's Club of New York. Also in 2021, the Women's Media Center recognized her with one of their "Exceptional Journalism Awards" in her role as an "International Climate Correspondent" for the Times.

Her coverage of lithium mining in Chile was cited as part of a Times team which shared the Overseas Press Club Whitman Bassow Award in 2021.

She is the winner of the 2024 Lifetime Achievement Award from the Newswomens Club of New York.

== Works ==
Sengupta has written one book, The End of Karma: Hope and Fury Among India's Young, published by W. W. Norton & Company. It was recognized by The Economist as one of their Books of the Year in 2016, and was also reviewed by The Seattle Times and The New Yorker.
