= Tripura (film) =

2015 Telugu horror-action film

- Directed by: Raj Kiran
- Produced by: A. Chinna Babu; M. Rajasekhar
- Starring: Swathi Reddy; Saptagiri; Rao Ramesh; Naveen Chandra
- Cinematography: Ravi Kumar Sana
- Music by: Kamran
- Release date: 6 November 2015
- Running time: 135 minutes
- Country: India
- Language: Telugu

Tripura is a 2015 Telugu horror-action film directed by Raj Kiran, starring Swathi Reddy and Naveen Chandra in the lead roles and produced by A Chinna Babu and M Rajasekhar. Kamran composed the film's soundtrack. This Movie Also dubbed in Hindi & Tamil by The Same Title by Zee Cinema & Zee Thirai.

== Plot ==
Tripura (Swathi Reddy) is a village girl who has weird dreams, and all those dreams come true. Tripura is taken to Hyderabad for her treatment about the dreams. There she meets a doctor, Naveen Chandra (Naveen Chandra), and they both fall in love and get married. They soon move into a big penthouse and Tripura notices paranormal activities. The doctor's colleague and friend, Dr. Eesha (Pooja Ramachandran) goes missing. As time passes, Tripura continues to get these dreams, until one day where she sees herself killing her husband with a knife.

Naveen's friend, Tilak, a police officer (Tilak Shekar) is working to search for Eesha. He tells Tripura that Naveen killed Eesha and that he will kill her also. When Naveen reaches home, Tripura stabs him. By the time the police officer had come at their house. Naveen tells Tripura that he did not kill her, but the police officer had killed their friend. So, when he tries to kill both of them, the ghost of the Eesha arrives and kills the police officer. Then the screen cuts to black.

== Cast ==
- Swathi Reddy as Tripura
- Naveen Chandra as Dr. Naveen Chandra, Tripura's husband
- Rao Ramesh ad psychology professor
- Saptagiri as Sanyasi Raj, Tripura's maternal uncle
- Sivannarayana Naripeddi as Sivannarayana, Tripura's father
- Jaya Prakash Reddy as Royyala Reddy
- Tilak Shekar as Police Officer Tilak
- Pooja Ramachandran as Dr. Eesha
- Preeti Nigam as Ganga, Tripura's Domestic worker
- Sriman as Taddi Taapaarao
- Shakalaka Shankar as Komala Babu, Royyala Reddy's son

== Soundtrack ==
No.	Title	Singer(s)	Length
1.	"Yelelo Yelelo"	Pranavi
2.	"Ninu Chudakunda"	Karthik
3.	"Yegirene Manansulu"	Karthik, Sri Vidya
4.	"Yavariki Teliyani"	Madhu Balakrishnan

== Reception ==
A critic from Deccan Chronicle wrote that "The highlight of the second half is the comedy scenes by Shakalaka Shankar and Jayaprakash Reddy. It gives a much-needed relief and boost to the film. Saptagiri has a full-length role, but sometimes he goes overboard, though he manages to evoke a laugh most of the time. Pooja in a cameo looks neat. The music is average though the dialogues are catchy".
