= Tippala Nagireddy =

Indian politician

Tippala Nagireddy (born 1954) is an Indian politician from Andhra Pradesh. He won the 2019 Andhra Pradesh Legislative Assembly Election on YSRCP ticket from Gajuwaka constituency in Visakhapatnam district. He defeated JSP chief Pawan Kalyan by a margin of 16,753 votes.

== Early life and education ==
Nagireddy hails from Visakhapatnam district. He is born to Tippala Appala Swamy in 1954. He completed his schooling from Gajuwaka high school in 1969.

== Career ==
In 2009, he lost the Assembly election as an independent candidate and later, he joined YSR Congress Party. He contested on YSR Congress party ticket in the 2014 election and lost to Palla Srinivasa Rao of TDP. But in the 2019 election, he won the Gajuwaka seat on YSR Congress party ticket. He is dropped by the YSRCP for the 2024 Assembly election and his son Tippala Devan Reddy resigned as the coordinator of Gajuwaka constituency. He later resigned from the YSRCP.
