= Raj Kiran (director) =

Telugu film director

- Occupation: Director
- Years active: 1999-present

Raj Kiran is an Indian film director known for his horror films like Geethanjali (2014) and Tripura (2015).

== Career ==
In his initial days, Raj Kiran ran a photo studio in Kaikaluru. He worked as a photographer of Maganti Babu, as the assistant production manager for Alludugaaru Vachcharu (1999) and as an assistant director for Choosoddaam Randi (2000), 9 Nelalu (2000) and Ninnu Choodalani (2001). While working on Ninnu Choodalani (2001), NTR Jr encouraged him and wanted him to work on another film with him. He was to debut in 2004 under Usha Kiron Movies, but he backed out after they made changes to the second half that he was not comfortable with. After liking Om Shanti Om (2007), he decided to make the film in Telugu as Geethanjali (2014), which also incorporated incidents from his real life. He wrote the film in a graveyard and wanted Sunil to be in the film before Srinivasa Reddy was finalized. He wanted to cast Swathi Reddy for the film, but due problems meant that Anjali was cast. The low-budget film was a box office success despite receiving mixed reviews. The director expressed interest in making a sequel to the film. He went on to make Tripura (2015) with Swati Reddy. Tripura was a box office failure and the director took a brief sabbatical from horror films and directed the film Luckunnodu (2017). He returned to the genre with Viswamitra (2019) starring Nanditha Raj and Satyam Rajesh.

== Personal life ==
Prior to the release of Geethanjali (2014) on 5 August 2014, the director had suffered a heart attack after being tensed by the film's delayed censor certification.

== Filmography ==
| Year | Film | Notes |
|---|---|---|
| 2014 | Geethanjali | |
| 2015 | Tripura | |
| 2017 | Luckunnodu | |
| 2019 | Viswamitra | |
