= Geethanjali (2014 film) =

- Movie poster
- Directed by: Raj Kiran
- Screenplay by: Kona Venkat
- Story by: Raj Kiran
- Produced by: M. V. V. Satyanarayana
- Starring: Anjali; Srinivasa Reddy
- Cinematography: Sai Sriram
- Edited by: Atkuri Teja
- Music by: Praveen Lakkaraju
- Production company: M.V.V Pictures
- Release date: 8 August 2014
- Country: India
- Language: Telugu
- Budget: ₹4 crore
- Box office: ₹10 crore distributors' share

Geethanjali is a 2014 Indian Telugu-language comedy horror film directed by debutant Raj Kiran. It stars Anjali and Srinivasa Reddy in lead roles. The film's soundtrack and background score were composed by Praveen Lakkaraju. The movie was remade in Kannada as Kathe Chitrakathe Nirdeshana Puttanna (2016). Anjali won the Nandi Award for Best Actress for her performance.

A sequel, Geethanjali Malli Vachindi, was released in 2024.

== Plot ==
Srinivas "Sreenu" is a wannabe film director who aims to win a Nandi award for a story he has written. He faces ridicule from different producers, including one who tries to make him adulterate the story and another woman who tells him that everybody in her family and staff including cooks and cleaners have to like the story if she is to produce it. He meets a businessman, Ramesh Rao, with whom, at first, he has a fight for being late for an appointment but eventually gets along with. He narrates the story to him. Rao also wants to do a film which will win him a Nandi award as he wants to dedicate it to his father.

In the opening scene in an apartment in Hyderabad, a girl commits suicide. The death appears to be suspicious and is being investigated by inspector Shravan, who at first suspects the security guard, who was the first one to find out about the suicide. The next day, Venkat Rao, a ventriloquist and the owner of the house, comes with a babaji who takes the spirit of the girl into a lemon but dies in a car accident on the way back.

Sreenu tells Ramesh Rao to imagine himself in place of the hero. In a bus from Vijayawada to Hyderabad, the hero meets a girl, Anjali. Both of them become friends during the journey, but the next morning, Anjali leaves without Sreenu knowing. After getting down from the bus, Sreenu goes to his friend Madhunandan, and it is revealed that he had actually come to Hyderabad to meet producer Dil Raju and narrate to him a story he wrote. A broker gets them a flat in the same building where the suicide took place. After a lot of persuasion, Sreenu agrees to stay there. There, he meets Athreya and Arudra, who claim to be assistants of Dil Raju although they are not and began to stay with Sreenu and Madhu. That night, Anjali came there as she thought her friends who used to stay there were still there? Sreenu manages to persuade her to come in with a cup of coffee as coffee is her weakness. Soon, she becomes a regular guest at the house. One day, two policemen come there and give Sreenu a bundle and tell him to put it in the prohibited room which belongs to the owners of the flat. When he keeps them inside, he sees a picture of Anjali in the room. Sreenu asks Venkatesh, the watchman, about the photo, and he tells Sreenu that it is a photo of the girl who committed suicide. Sreenu, Athreya, and Arudra are frightened out of their wits when Venkatesh tells them that he hasn't seen any girl enter the apartment at night for a week. That night, the doorbell rings again, but Sreenu does not open the door. The next morning, he packs everything that belongs to him and runs away from the apartment.

It is now revealed that whatever Sreenu told Ramesh Rao is his real-life story. But Ramesh Rao impressed with his story and offers an advance check to Sreenu, But Sreenu tells Rao that he just wanted to tell the story to somebody, and he doesn't want to actually make it into a movie. And saying so, he leaves from there. On the way back, Sreenu encounters a friend of Anjali whose photo he had seen in the room. When he inquires with the girl, he finds out that Anjali had a boyfriend, Madhunandan, who was in jail as people believed him to be the reason Anjali committed suicide. At first, Sreenu thinks it is his friend, Madhu, but later finds out it is not. Madhu takes Sreenu, Athreya, and Arudra to his uncle Shaitan Raj, a psychiatrist. Raj helps the three of them, and they find out it is just a man who has been hiding there as he thought he will get a free house if they also run away. The 4 of them encourage the man to work for a living. That night, Anjali comes there to tell them the truth. She reveals to them that her name is Ushanjali, and the one who died is her identical elder twin sister, Geethanjali. Geethanjali was in love with Madhu, but her boss, Ramesh Rao, raped her after she refused for a one night stand with him. Rao killed Geethanjali, and Madhu framed for her death. The gang decides to take revenge on Rao. Sreenu comes back and takes his check and tells Rao that he went back to the flat and the girl's spirit was coming that night to tell him who killed her. Rao tells Sreenu he, too, will come along and hear the spirit. Sreenu and the gang send Ushanjali to Shaitan Raj to train in the language and body language of devils so that she can act as Geethanjali's spirit.

That night, at Sreenu's house, Rao reveals he knows everything and that the spirit who has come now is not Geethanjali but Ushanjali. In a fit of rage, Ushanjali kills Ramesh Rao and then goes away. Just after she leaves, she returns and apologises for being late and that she is ready. It is then revealed that Ushanjali got locked inside her house and that the one who came was the real Geethanjali (who escaped from the lemon after it broke open). The ending scene shows all of them together celebrating Madhunandan's birthday, and Arudra and Athreya announced that Srinu is going to direct his first film based on this event.

== Cast ==
- Anjali as
  - Geetanjali
  - Ushanjali
- Srinivasa Reddy as Sreenivas (Sreenu)
- Madhunandan as Madhunandan (Shaitan Raj's nephew)
- Harshvardhan Rane as Madhunandan, Geetanjali's boyfriend, Software Engineer
- Brahmanandam as Shaitan Raj
- Ali as Ventriloquist Venkat Rao the haunted house owner
- Rao Ramesh as Ramesh Rao
- Satyam Rajesh as Rajesh/Athreya
- Shakalaka Shankar as Shankar/Arudra
- C. V. L. Narasimha Rao as Madhunandan (Harshavardan Rane)'s father
- Raghu Babu as film producer
- Jhansi as film producer
- Rajeev Kanakala in special appearance of the song "Nee Viswaroopam"
- Prudhvi Raj as house broker
- Vennela Kishore as a patient of Shaitan Raj
- Saptagiri as a ghost in the house
- Harsha Vardhan as Venkatesh, watchman
- Sravan as Inspector Sravan
- Dil Raju as himself (special appearance)

== Production ==
"'Geethanjali' will remain as a milestone in the career of Anjali as Arundhati for Anushka Shetty and Chandramukhi for Jyothika. The film will have unexpected twists and turns. It is a very different film from all the horror thrillers which have come till now."

— Kona Venkat

Debutant director Raj Kiran, announced his first film featuring Anjali and Srinivasa Reddy. He titled the horror comedy women-centric film as 'Geethanjali.The first look launch event of the movie was held in Hyderabad and V. V. Vinayak, who has attended as the chief guest, launched the first look.

== Soundtrack ==
Geethanjali

Soundtrack album by Praveen Lakkaraju
- Released: July 17, 2014
- Recorded: 2014
- Genre: Soundtrack
- Length: 17:30
- Label: Shreyas Music

Track list
No.	Title	Singer(s)	Length
1.	"Coffee Song"	Ramya Behara, Sri Krishna	4:00
2.	"Na Manasuni thakey"	Haricharan, Harini	3:13
3.	"Raghuvansha Sudha"	Magharaj, Pranavi Acharya, Rahulp	3:58
4.	"Shaitan Raj"	Baba Sehgal, Brahmanandam, Pranavi Acharya	3:36
5.	"Vishwaroopam"	Shankar Mahadevan	3:28
Total length:			17:30

== Reception ==
The movie gained mixed reviews.

=== Critical response ===
A reviewer from Idlebrain.com wrote "The entertainment in the first half and a few moments in the second half are enjoyable. We have to wait and see how the movie lovers lap the Geethanjali up". A critic from Sakshi.com says "Going into the story in the second half seems to slow down a bit. However, due to the positive aspects being in excess, some of the flaws do not stand out".

== Awards ==
Year	Award category	Winner	Result	Ref.
2014	Nandi Award for Best Actress	Anjali	Won	
2015	SICA - South Indian Cinematographers Association Award	Anjali	Won	
