= Praja Shanti Party =

Indian political party

- Abbreviation: PSP
- Leader: K. A. Paul
- President: K. A. Paul
- Founder: K. A. Paul
- Membership: Harish raj
- Ideology: Secularism; Peace
- Colours: Blue (mostly); White; Dark Green
- ECI Status: Unrecognised

Election symbol
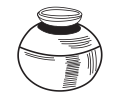

Party flag
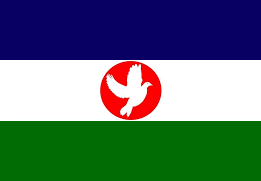

Praja Shanti Party is an Indian political party in the states of Andhra Pradesh and Telangana, founded by the noted evangelist K. A. Paul. The party was registered in 2008.

== Overview ==
Praja Shanti Party contested in the 2019 Andhra Pradesh Legislative Assembly election along with 2019 Lok Sabha election. Its symbol is Helicopter.

In 2022 after the defeat of Praja Shanti Party in 2019 Andhra Pradesh Legislative Assembly election, Paul claimed to contest in the upcoming 2023 Telangana Legislative Assembly election.

In September 2022, Election Commission of India delisted Praja Shanti Party stating that it violates the provisions of the Representation of the People Act, 1951.

== Electoral performance ==
Year	Party leader	Seats won	Change in seats	Percentage of votes	Popular vote	Outcome	Ref.
United Andhra Pradesh
2009	K. A. Paul	0 / 294	new	0.01%	4,397	Others	
Andhra Pradesh
2019	K. A. Paul	0 / 175	new	0.04%	12,675	Others	
