= Peddapuram revenue division =

Coordinates: 15°54′N 80°40′E

- revenue division in Kakinada district
- Interactive map of Peddapuram revenue division
- Country: India
- State: Andhra Pradesh
- District: Kakinada

Peddapuram revenue division (or Peddapuram division) is an administrative division in the Kakinada district of the Indian state of Andhra Pradesh. It is one of the 2 revenue divisions in the district. It consists of 11 mandals. Peddapuram is the divisional headquarters.

== Administration ==
There are 11 mandals in Peddapuram revenue division.

1. Gandepalle
2. Jaggampeta
3. Kirlampudi
4. Kotananduru
5. Peddapuram
6. Prathipadu
7. Rowthulapudi
8. Samalkota
9. Sankhavaram
10. Tuni
11. Yeleswaram

== See also ==
- List of revenue divisions in Andhra Pradesh
- List of mandals in Andhra Pradesh
