= Kakinada revenue division =

Coordinates: 15°54′N 80°40′E

- revenue division in Kakinada district
- Interactive map of Kakinada revenue division
- Country: India
- State: Andhra Pradesh
- District: Kakinada

Kakinada revenue division (or Kakinada division) is an administrative division in the Kakinada district of the Indian state of Andhra Pradesh. It is one of the two revenue divisions in the district which consists of twenty one mandals under its administration. Kakinada city is the divisional headquarters.

== Mandals ==
The mandals in the division are

1. Gollaprolu
2. Kajuluru
3. Kakinada Rural
4. Kakinada Urban
5. Karapa
6. Pedapudi
7. Pithapuram
8. Thallarevu
9. Thondangi
10. U. Kothapalli

== See also ==
- List of revenue divisions in Andhra Pradesh
- List of mandals in Andhra Pradesh
