= Kodandarama Temple, Gollala Mamidada =

Hindu temple in India

Kodandarama Temple
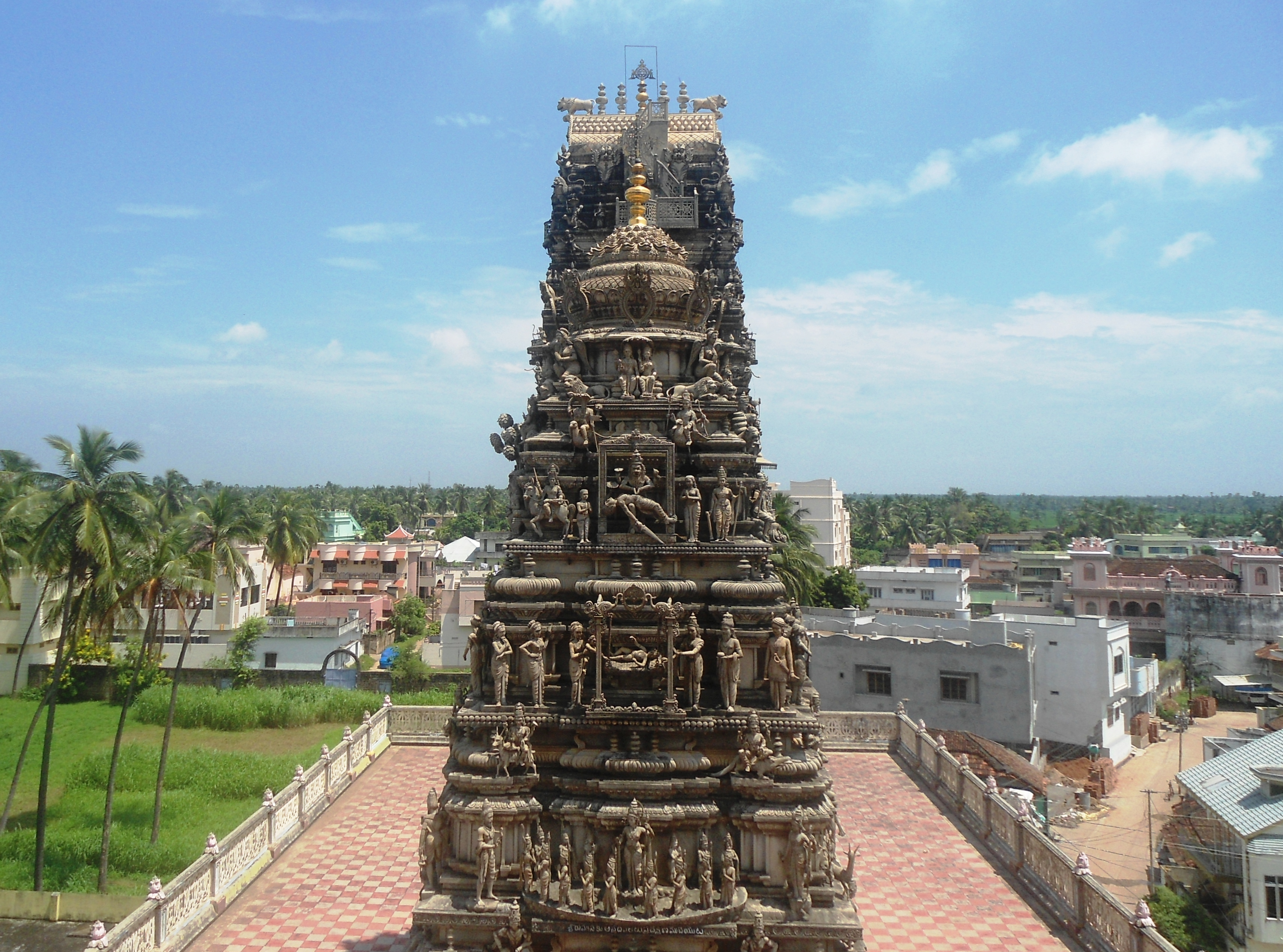
- One of the gopurams of the temple

- Location in Andhra Pradesh

Religion
- Affiliation: Hinduism
- District: Kakinada
- Deity: Kodandarama Swamy
- Festivals: Sri Rama Navami; Vaikunta Ekadasi; Vijayadasami

Location
- Location: Gollala Mamidada
- State: Andhra Pradesh
- Country: India
- Interactive map of Kodandarama Temple
- Coordinates: 16°56′17.6″N 82°4′25.6″E

Architecture
- Established: 1889
- Completed: 1956–58

Kodandarama Temple is a Hindu temple located in Gollala Mamidada in Kakinada district of Andhra Pradesh, India. The temple is dedicated to Rama, the seventh incarnation of Vishnu. It was built on the banks of Tulyabhaga (Antharvahini), a tributary of Godavari.

The temple is notable for its unique architecture and two huge gopurams which stand at 160–170 feet (49–52 m) and 200–210 feet (61–64 m). The temple gopurams are adorned with intricately carved statues depicting scenes from Ramayana, Mahabharata, and Bhagavata. The construction of the temple began in 1889 when brothers Dwarampudi Subbi Reddy and Rami Reddy donated land and built a small temple with wooden idols of Rama and Sita. A larger temple was built in 1939. The two gopurams were constructed in 1948–50 and 1956–58.

The temple is also known as 'Chinna Bhadradi' or the 'Little Bhadrachalam'. It is one of the two most popular Rama temples in Andhra Pradesh along with Kodandarama temple in Vontimitta. Sri Rama Navami is the most prominent festival celebrated at the temple and features an annual wedding ceremony of Rama and Sita. Other important festivals celebrated at the temple are Vaikunta Ekadasi and Vijayadasami.

== History ==
The Kodandarama Temple was founded in 1889 by brothers Dwarampudi Subbi Reddy and Rami Reddy, local zamindars who donated land on the banks of the Tulyabhaga river. The original structure was a modest shrine housing wooden idols of Rama and Sita.

In 1939, a larger stone temple was constructed to accommodate the growing number of devotees visiting from across the Konaseema region. The temple underwent significant expansion in the mid-20th century:

- 1948–1950: Construction of the east-facing gopuram (160–170 feet, nine storeys)
- 1956–1958: Construction of the west-facing gopuram (200–210 feet, eleven storeys)
- 1975: Addition of the mirror hall (addala mandapam in Telugu) above the sanctum sanctorum

The temple earned the epithet "Chinna Bhadradri" (Little Bhadrachalam) due to its growing prominence as a major Rama pilgrimage site in coastal Andhra Pradesh.

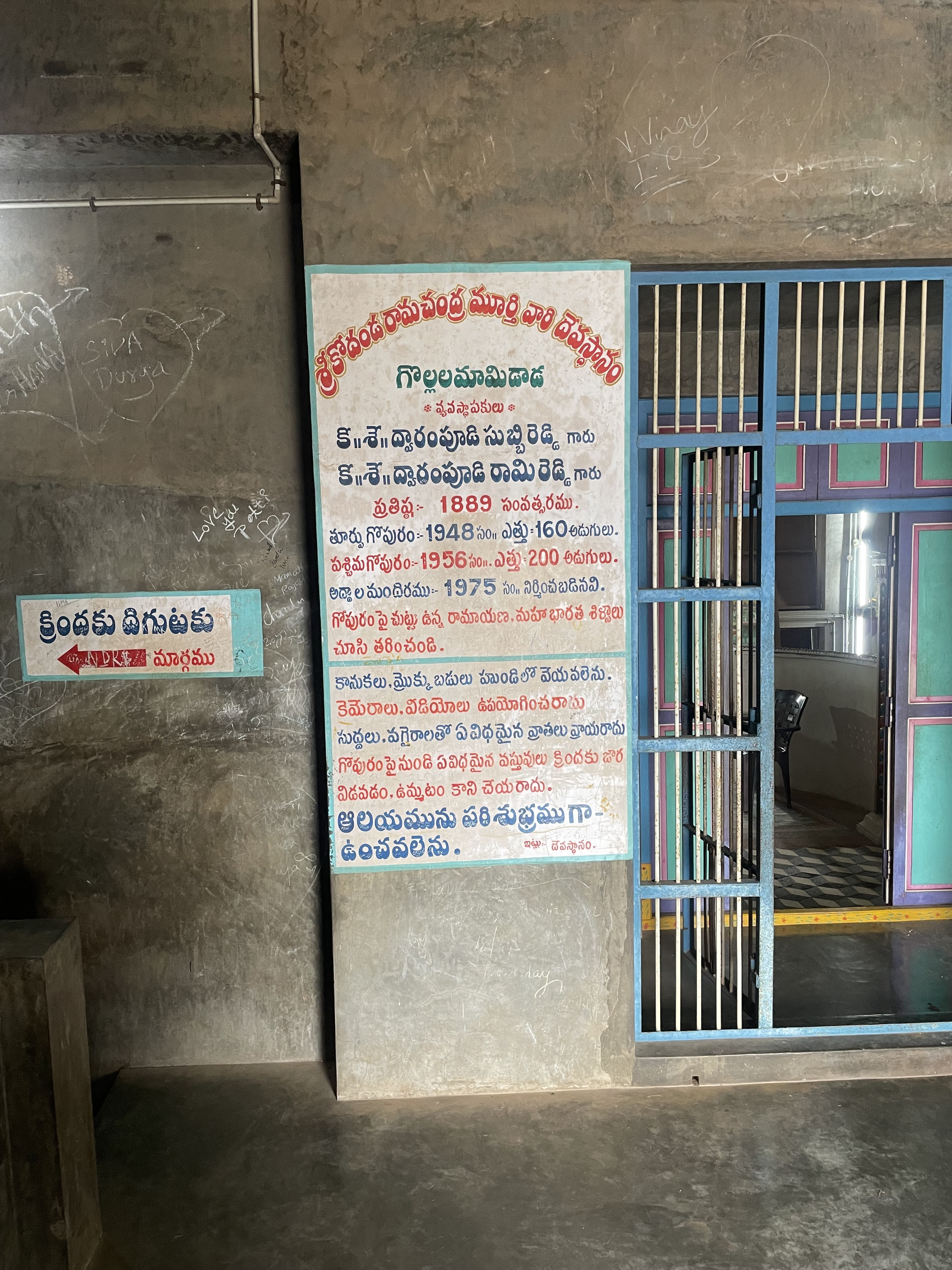
Inscription plaque detailing the construction history of Kodandarama Temple, documenting the contributions of the Dwarampudi family who founded the temple in 1889 and subsequent expansions through 1975.

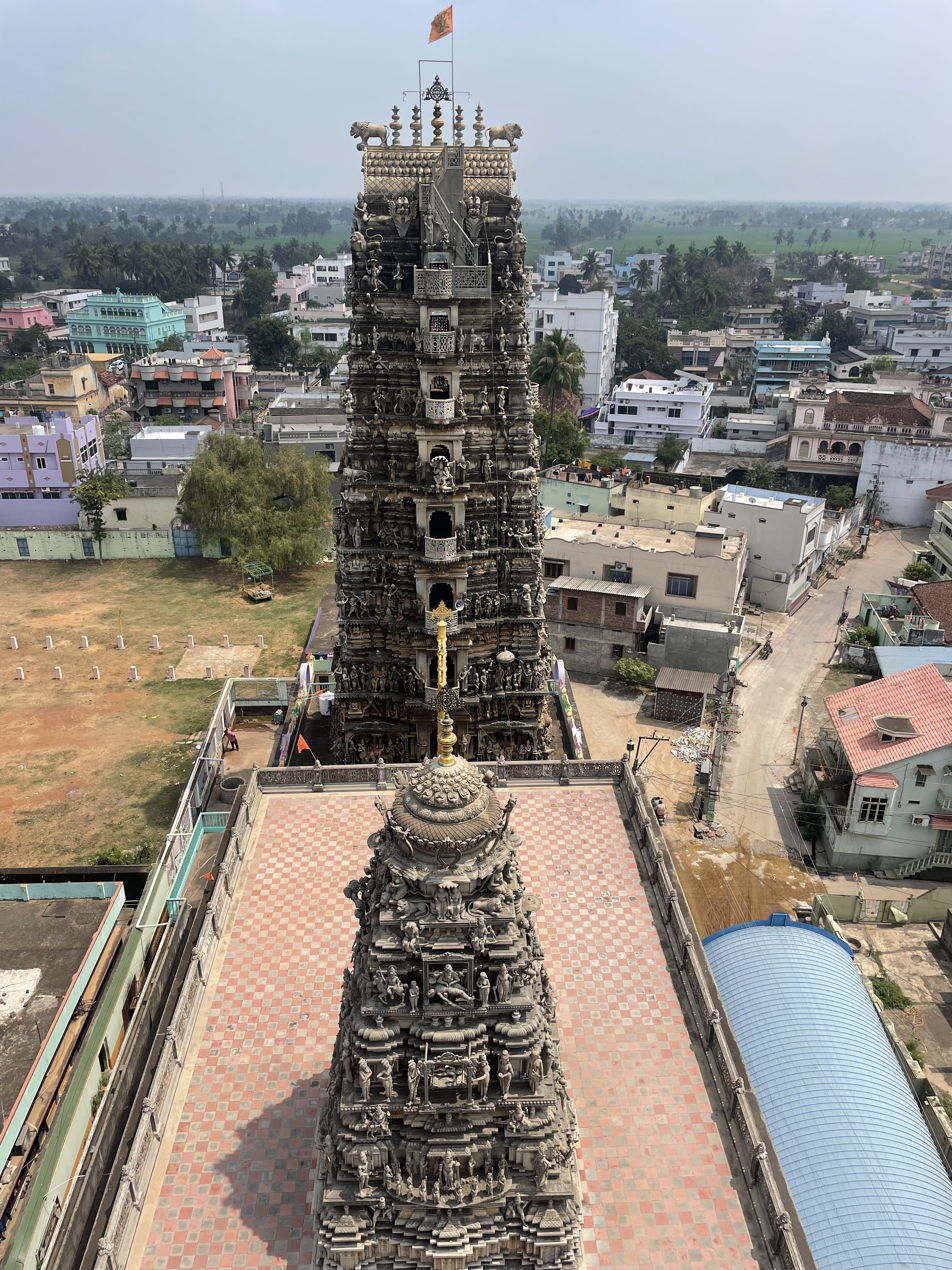
View of 160 feet gopuram from 200 feet gorumpam top floor.jpeg|thumb|300px|Alternate angle of the east gopuram captured from the uppermost floor of the 200-feet west gopuram, showcasing the Dravidian-style tiered structure and the surrounding village of Gollala Mamidada in Kakinada district.

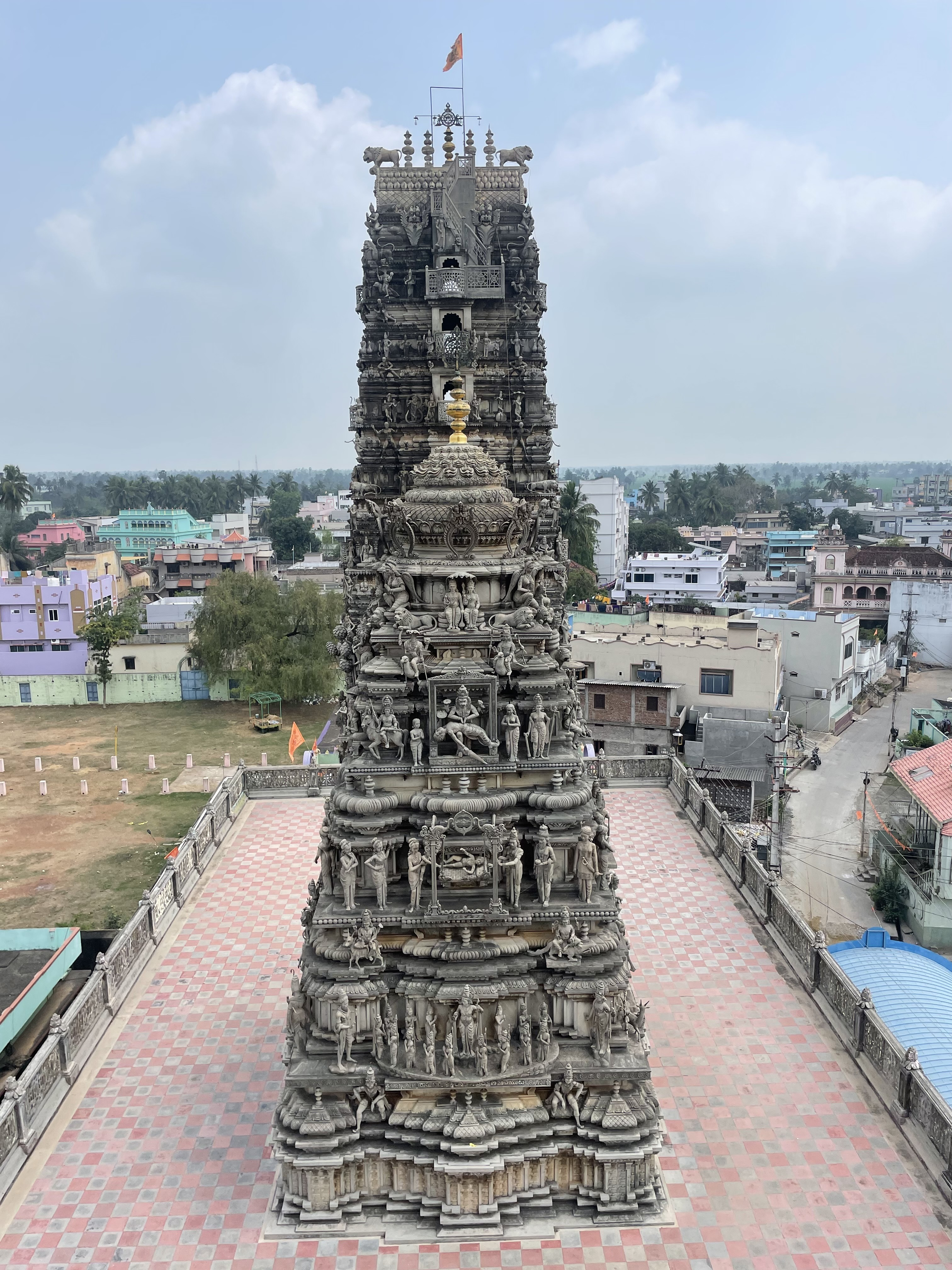
From 6th floor of 200 feet gorupam middle main gopuram and 160 feet gopuram.jpeg|thumb|300px|Panoramic view from the sixth floor of the west gopuram showing the central mandapam (middle structure) and the east-facing 160-feet gopuram in the background. The temple complex sits on the banks of the Tulyabhaga river, a tributary of the Godavari. Devotees can access the upper floors via a 300-step climb.

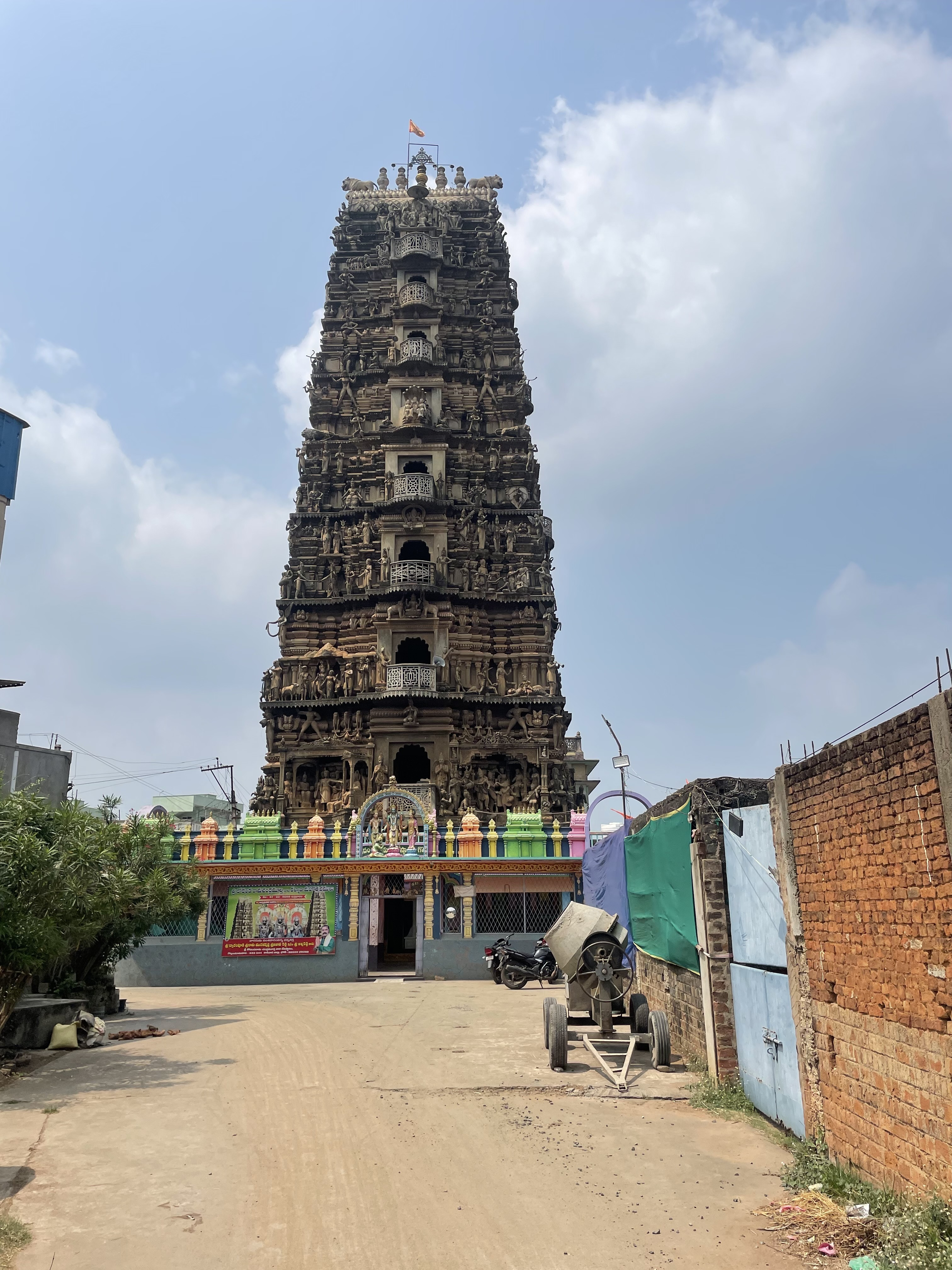
Kodandarama Temple 160 feet gopuram.jpeg|thumb|300px|Full elevation view of the nine-storey east gopuram of Kodandarama Temple. Each floor features carved statues depicting episodes from Hindu epics. The shikhara (tower crown) is adorned with Bala Ramayana scenes depicting the childhood of Rama.

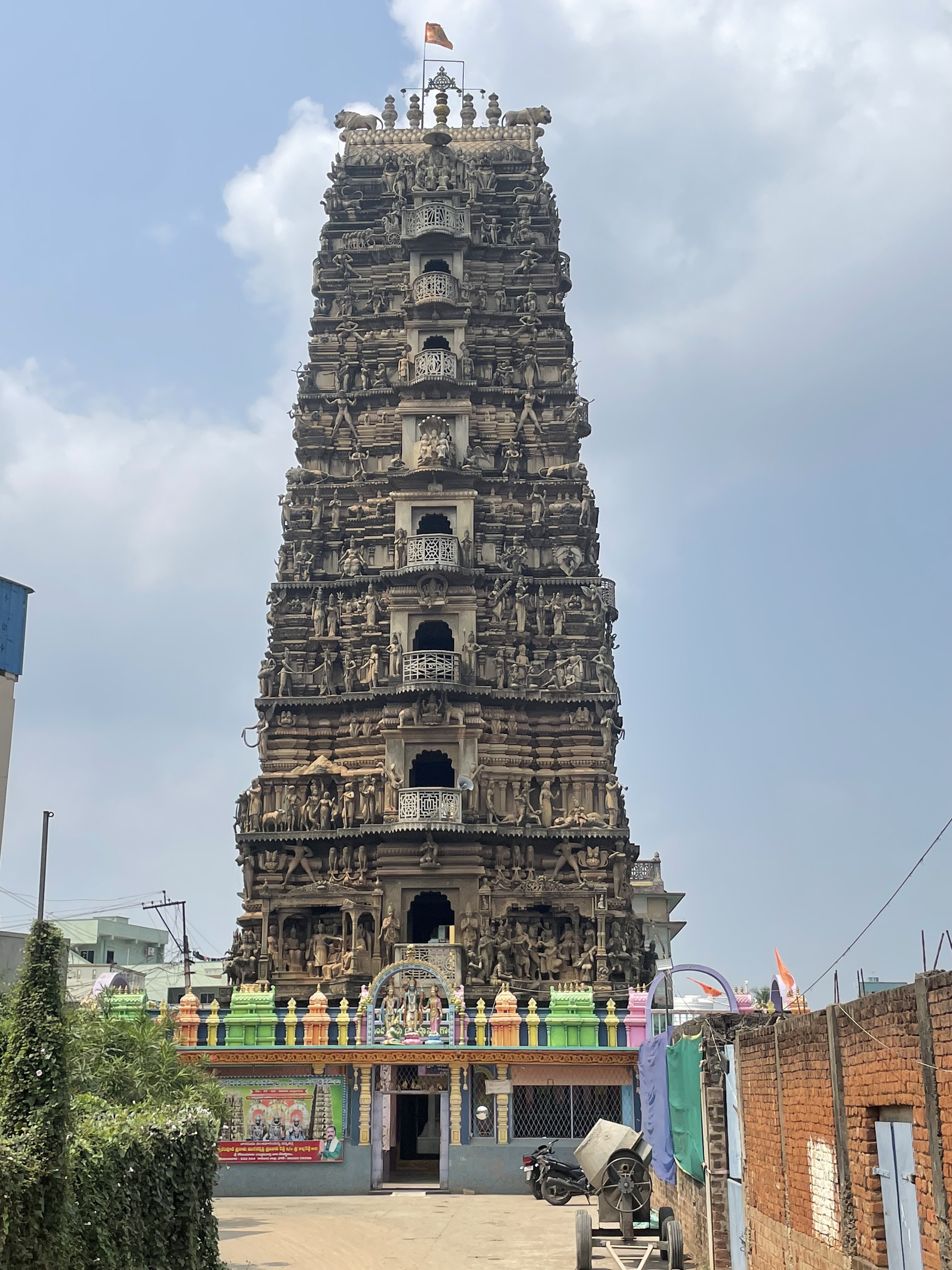
160 feet gopruam entrance: The east-facing gopuram (160–170 feet) viewed from the rear entrance. This nine-storey tower was constructed between 1948–1950 and features five kalasams (golden finials) at its peak. The gopuram serves as the traditional entry point for devotees arriving from Kakinada.

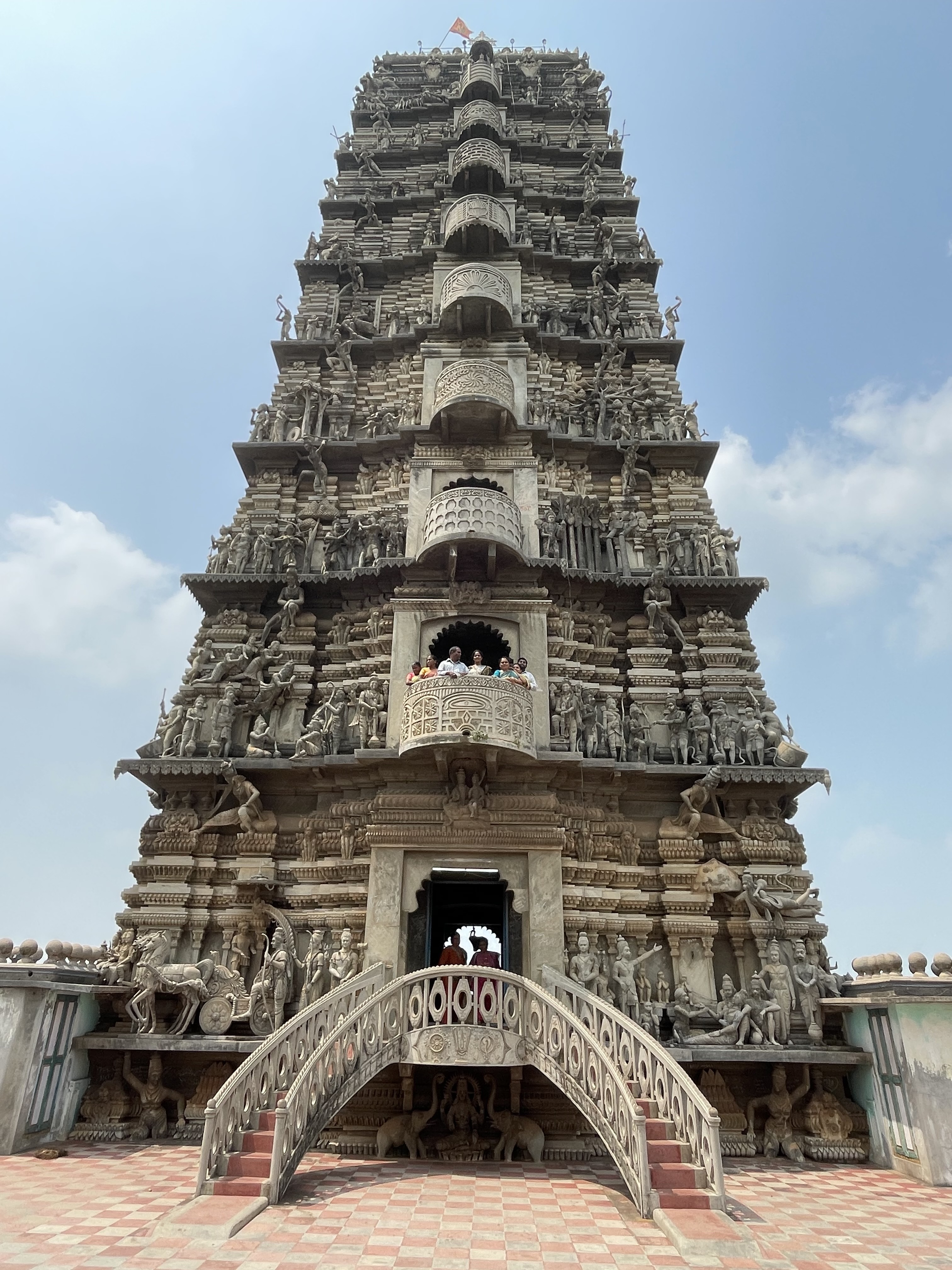
200 feet gopuram from 3rd floor of the temple form middle gopuram.jpeg|thumb|300px|The west-facing gopuram (200–210 feet) as seen from the third floor of the central mandapam. This eleven-storey structure, completed between 1956–1958, is one of the tallest temple towers in Andhra Pradesh. The intricate stucco work depicts scenes from the Ramayana, Mahabharata, and Bhagavata Purana.

== The Temple ==
The construction of the temple began in 1889 by brothers Dwarampudi Subbi Reddy and Rami Reddy who donated land and built a small temple with wooden idols of Rama and Sita. A larger temple was built in 1939. The east and west gopurams were built in 1948–50 and 1956–58 respectively. The east-facing gopuram is 160–170 feet high and has nine storeys and five kalasams. The west-facing gopuram is 200–210 feet high and has 11 storeys and five kalasams.

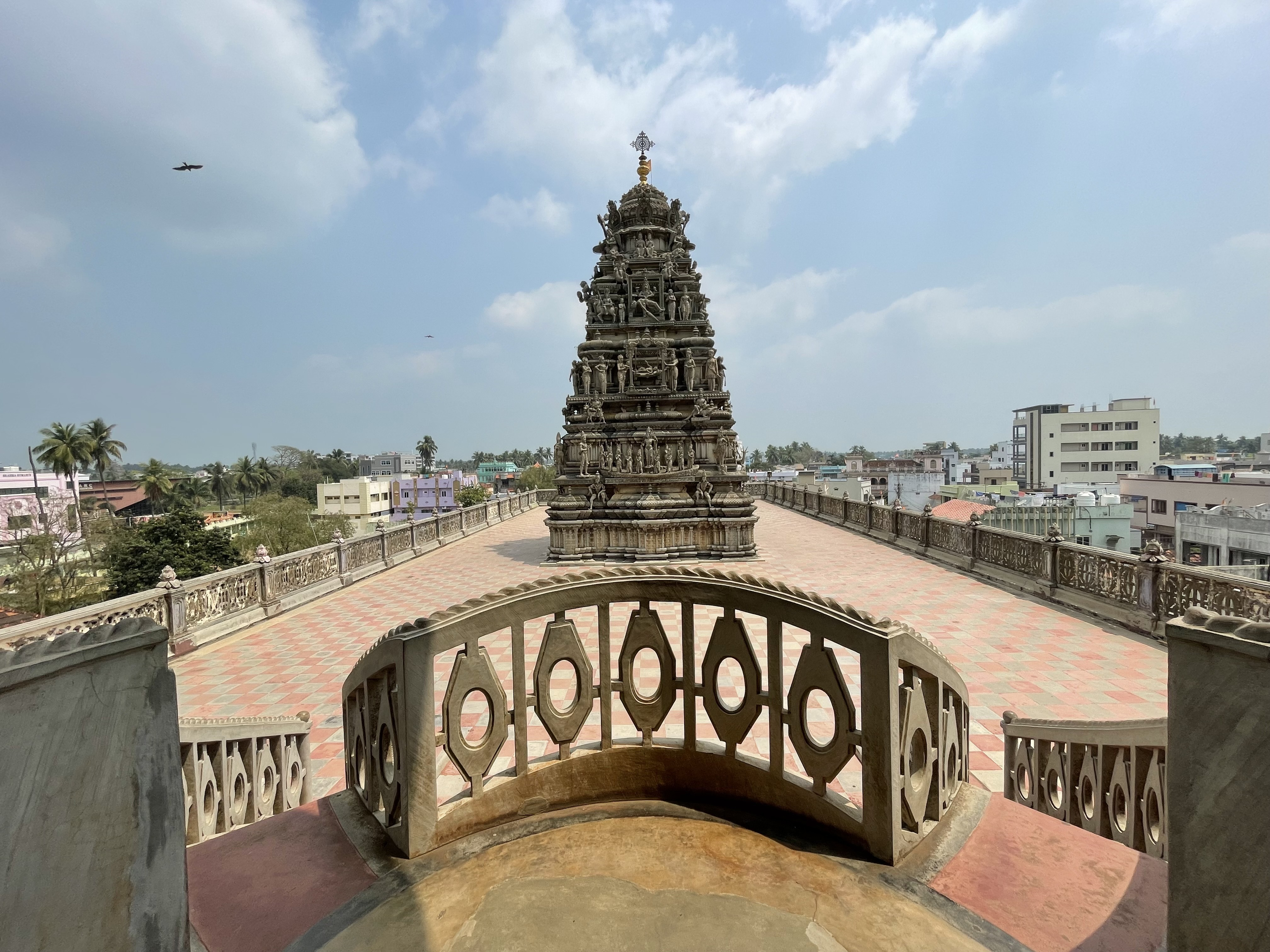
Third floor Middle Gopuram, Main temple.

A mirror hall (addala mandapam in Telugu) was built between the two mandapams, above the sanctum sanctorum in 1975. The mirror hall has a stucco relief of Sri Rama Pattabhishekam (coronation of Rama) on one side and of Rama blessing Hanuman on the other side. The garbhalayam contains the idols of Rama, Lakshmana, and Sita along with Hanuman.

There are intricately carved statues depicting scenes from Ramayana, Mahabharata, and Bhagavatam on the four sides of the gopurams in each floor. The Sikhara of the temple is carved with statues depicting Bala Ramayana (childhood of Rama). Devotees can reach the top storey of the gopurams through a 300-step climb.

Around 200 metres from the temple is a Pushkarini, a small pond of water sourced from the Tulyabhaga river. Water from the Pushkarini is used in various religious ceremonies at the temple.

== Location ==
Kodandarama Temple is situated in Gollala Mamidada village in Pedapudi Mandal of Kakinada district in Andhra Pradesh. The temple is located at a distance of 25 km from Kakinada, 45 km from Rajahmundry, 85 km from Tuni and 180 km from Visakhapatnam. Also located in the same village is the Suryanarayana Temple, a Sun temple.

== Festivals ==
Sri Rama Navami is the most prominent festival celebrated at the temple. It features an annual wedding ceremony of Rama and Sita. The District Collector along with the local MLA and their spouses offer silk clothes to the presiding deities on the occasion. After the wedding ceremony, the murtis are taken in a procession across the streets. A grand offering of food (Annadanam) is made to the devotees on the occasion. Other important festivals celebrated at the temple are Vaikunta Ekadasi and Vijayadasami.

== Gallery ==
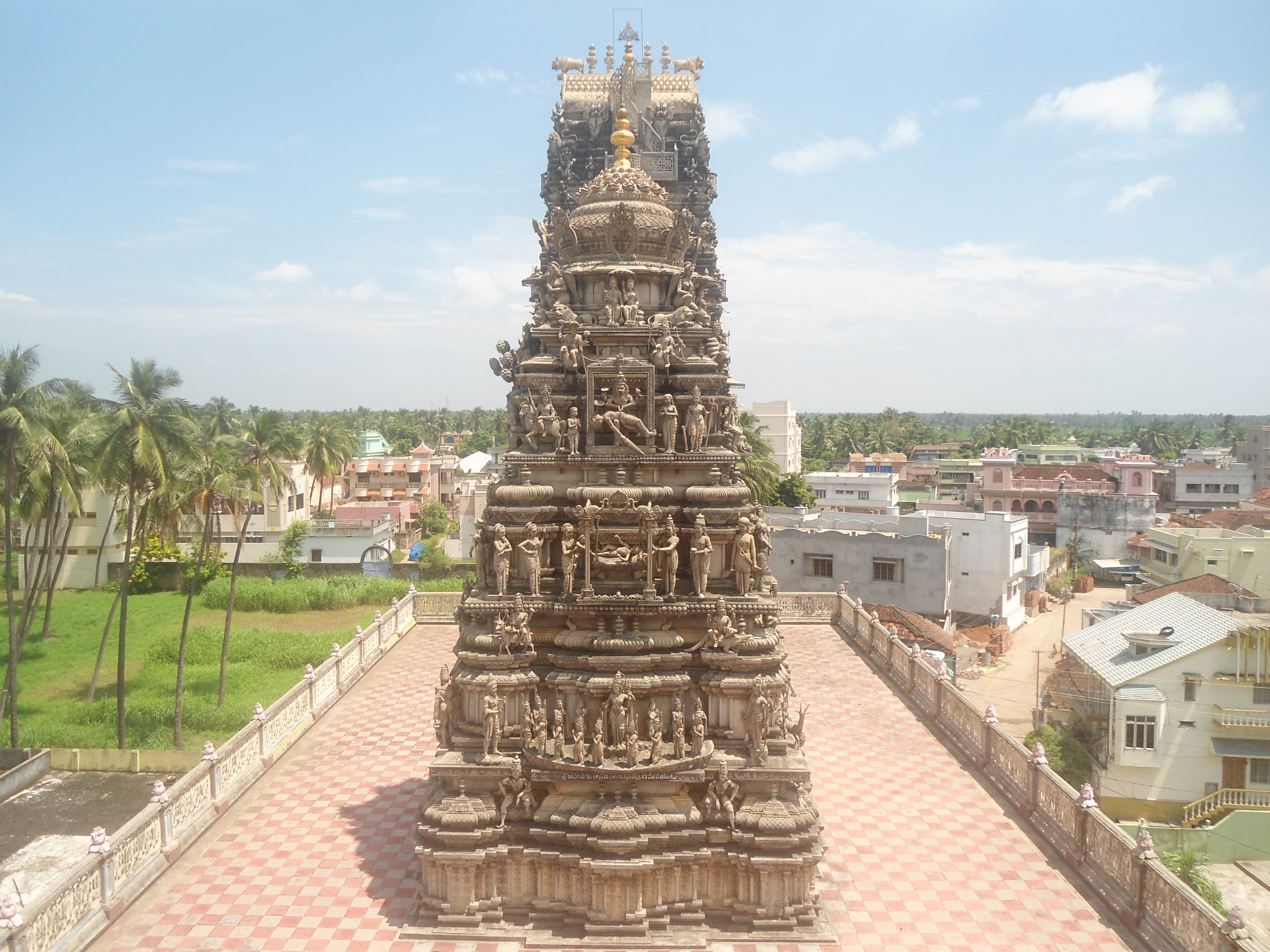

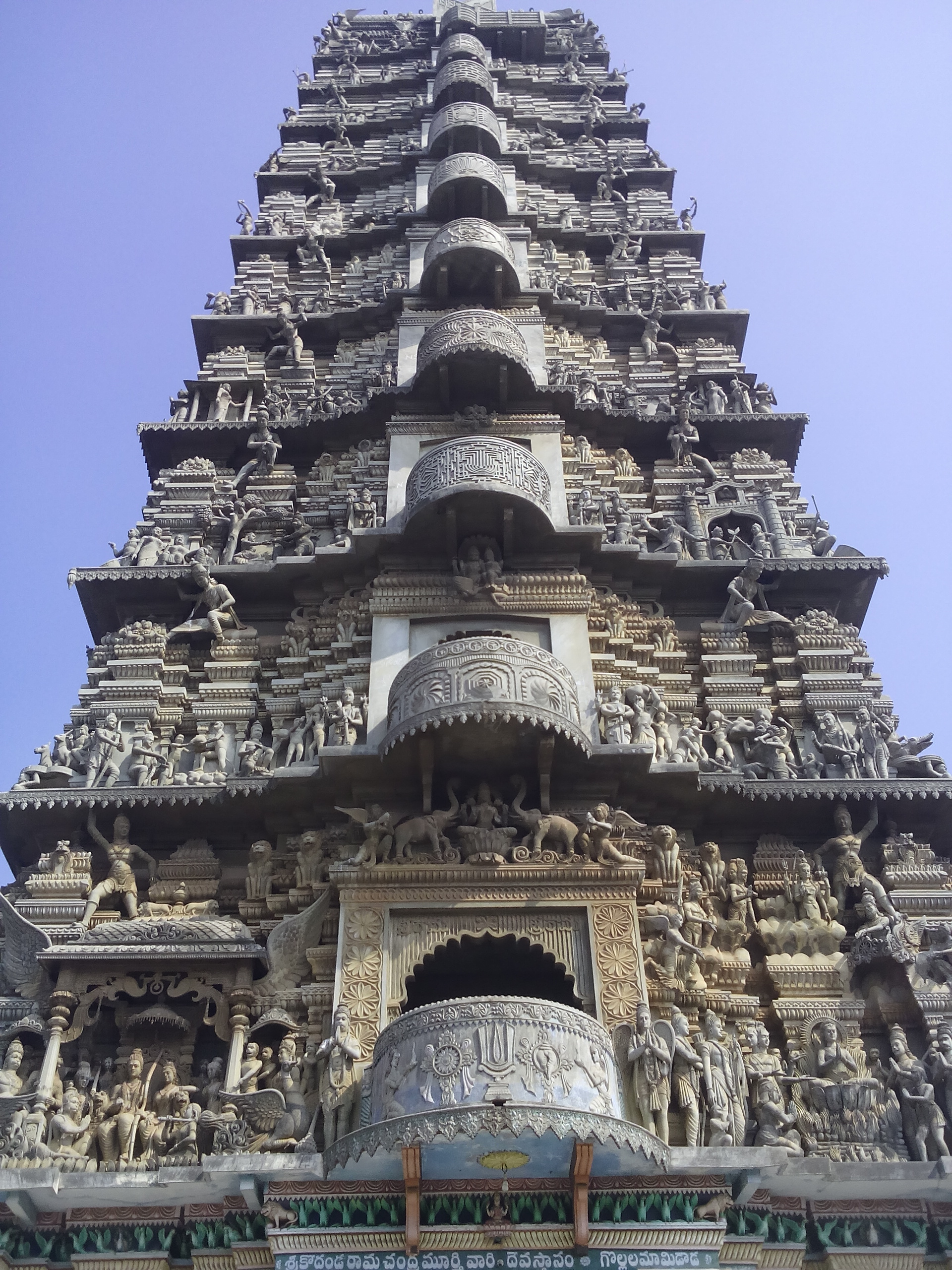

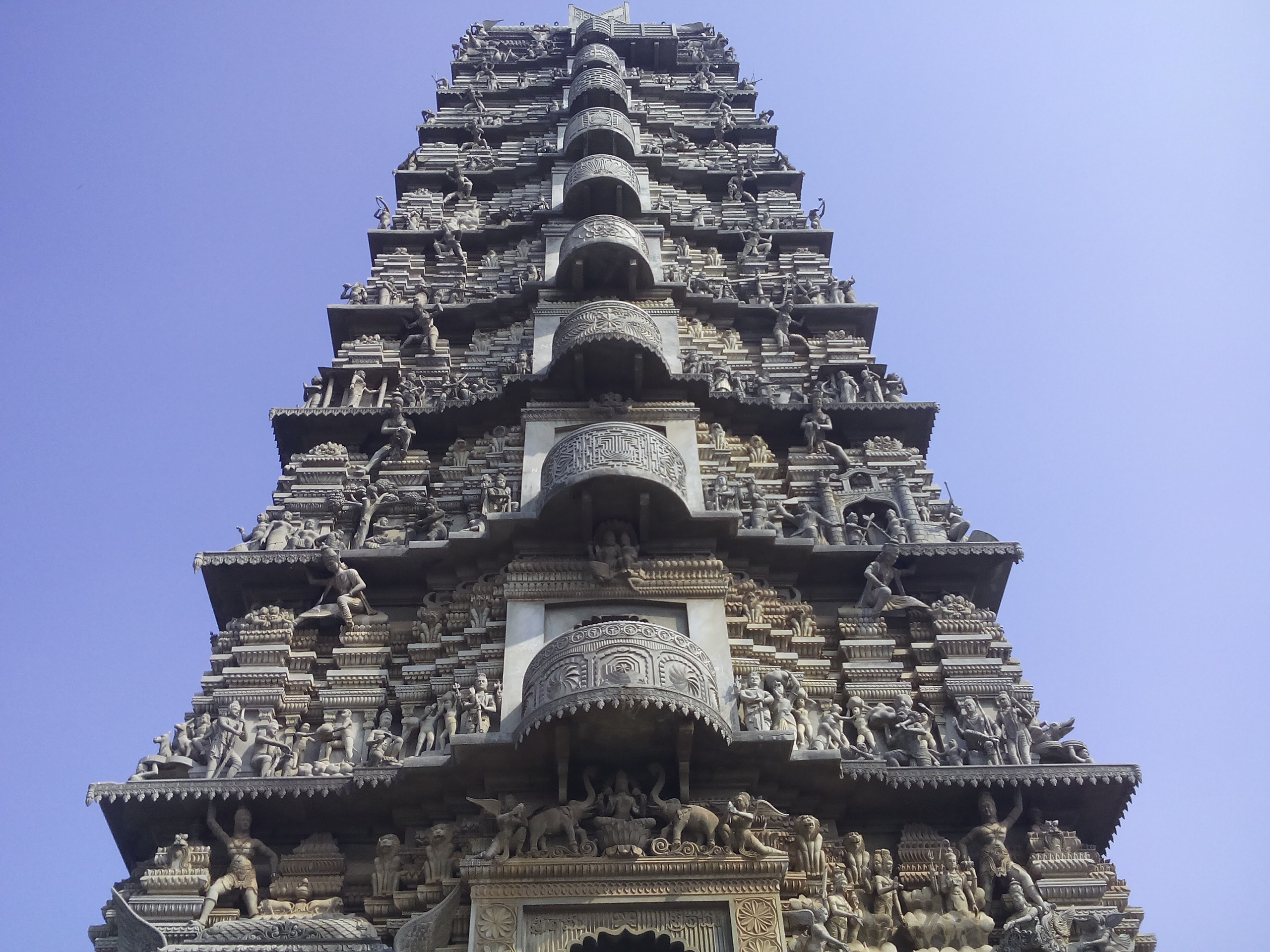

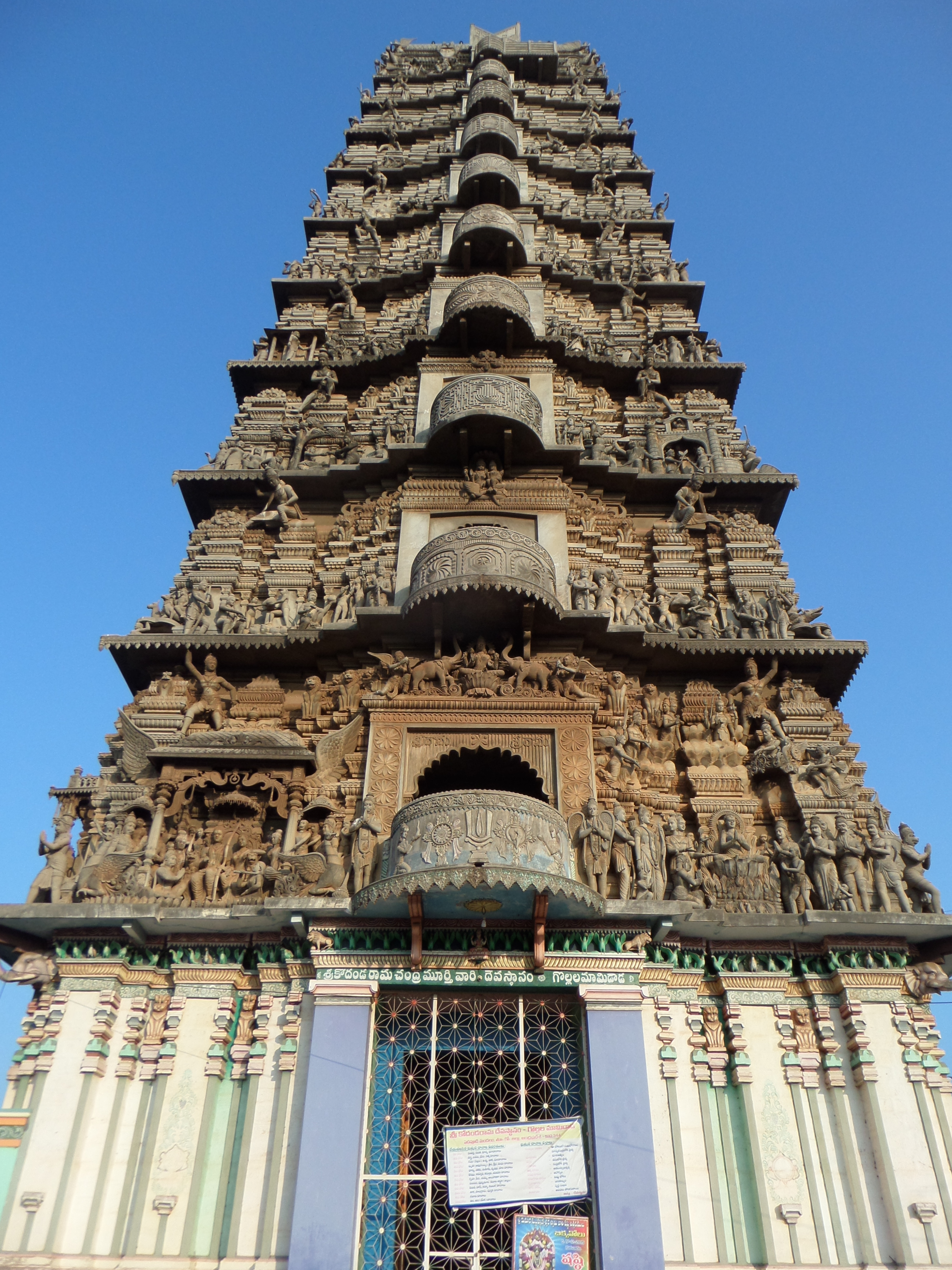

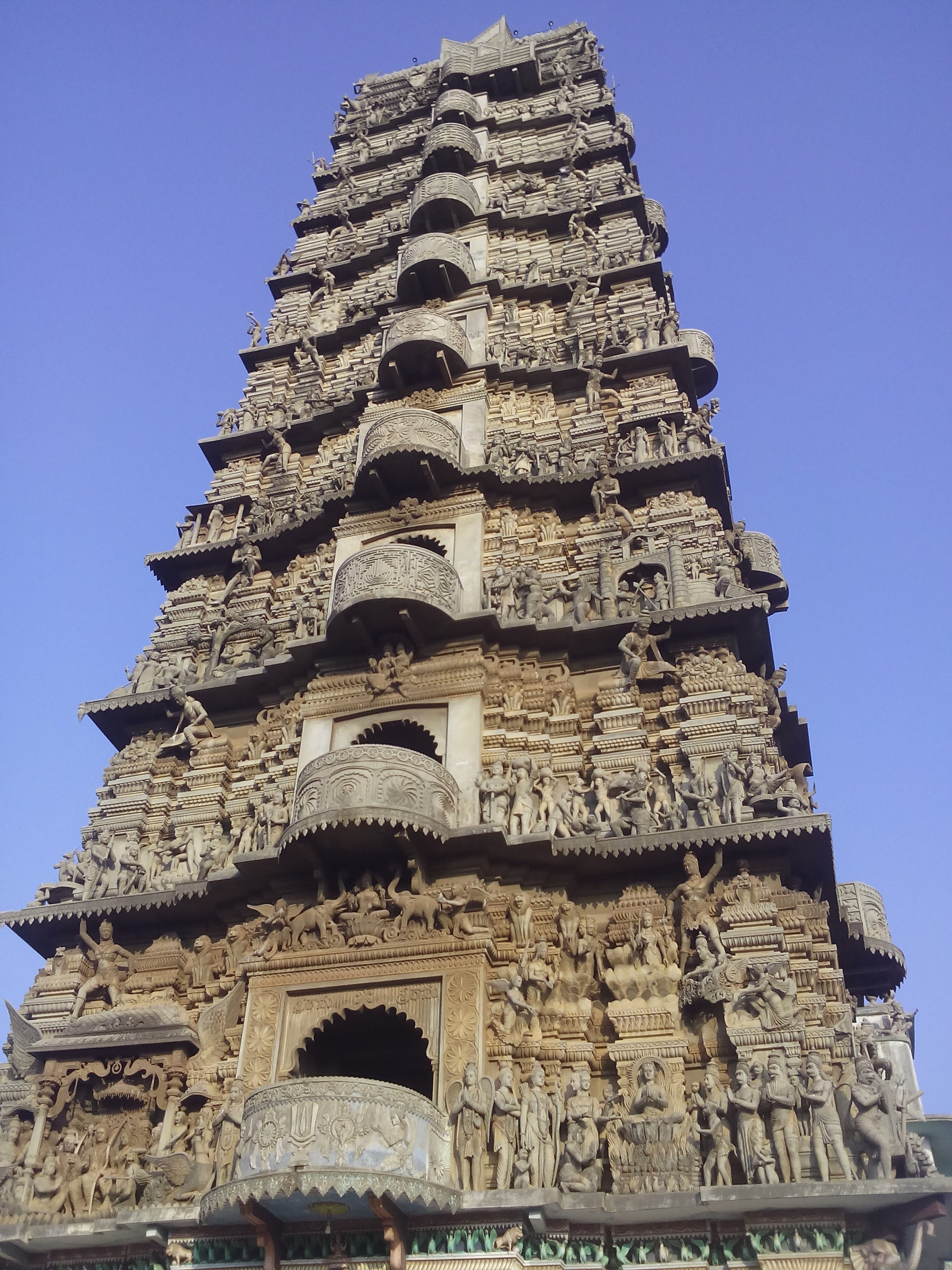

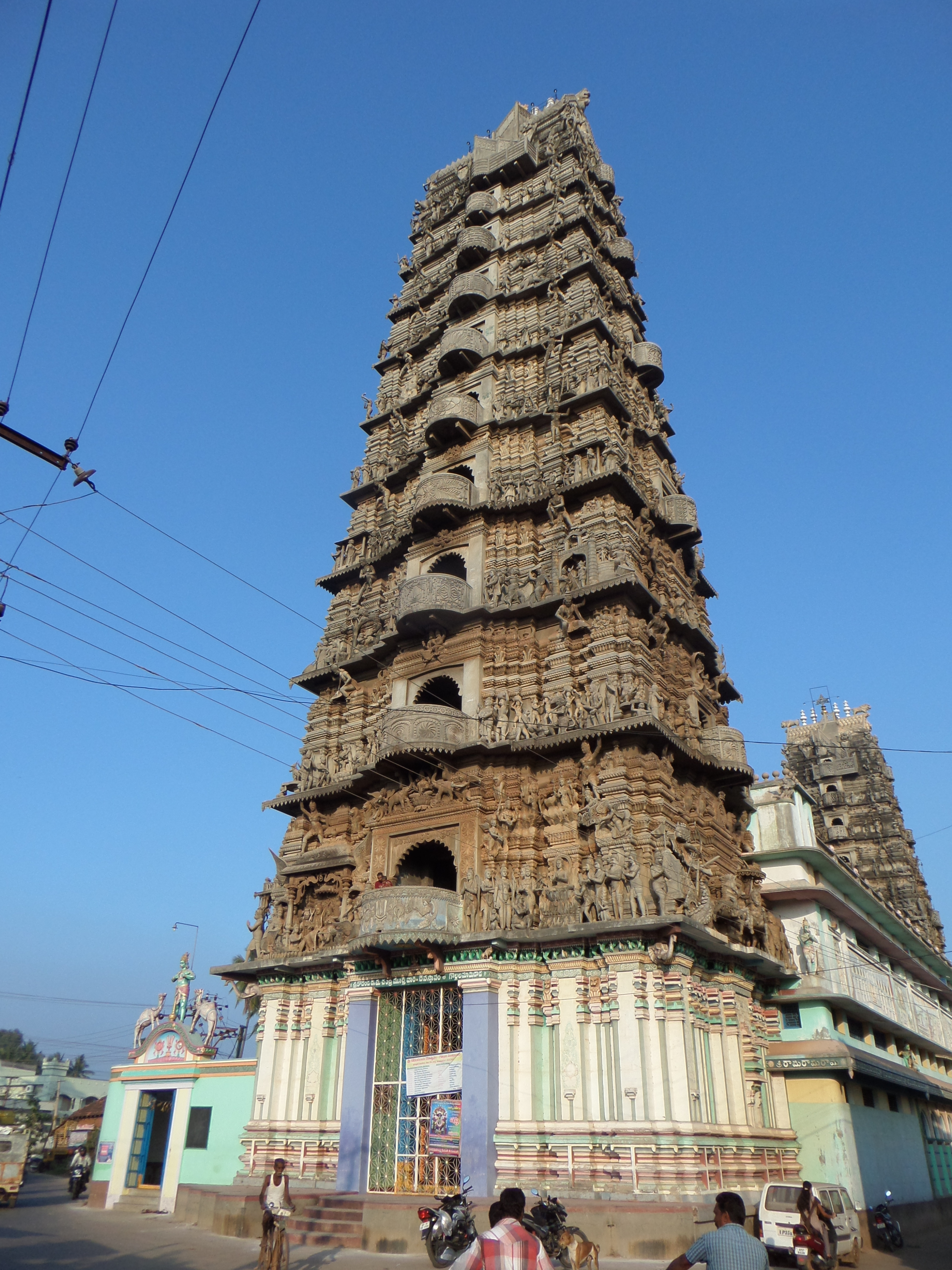

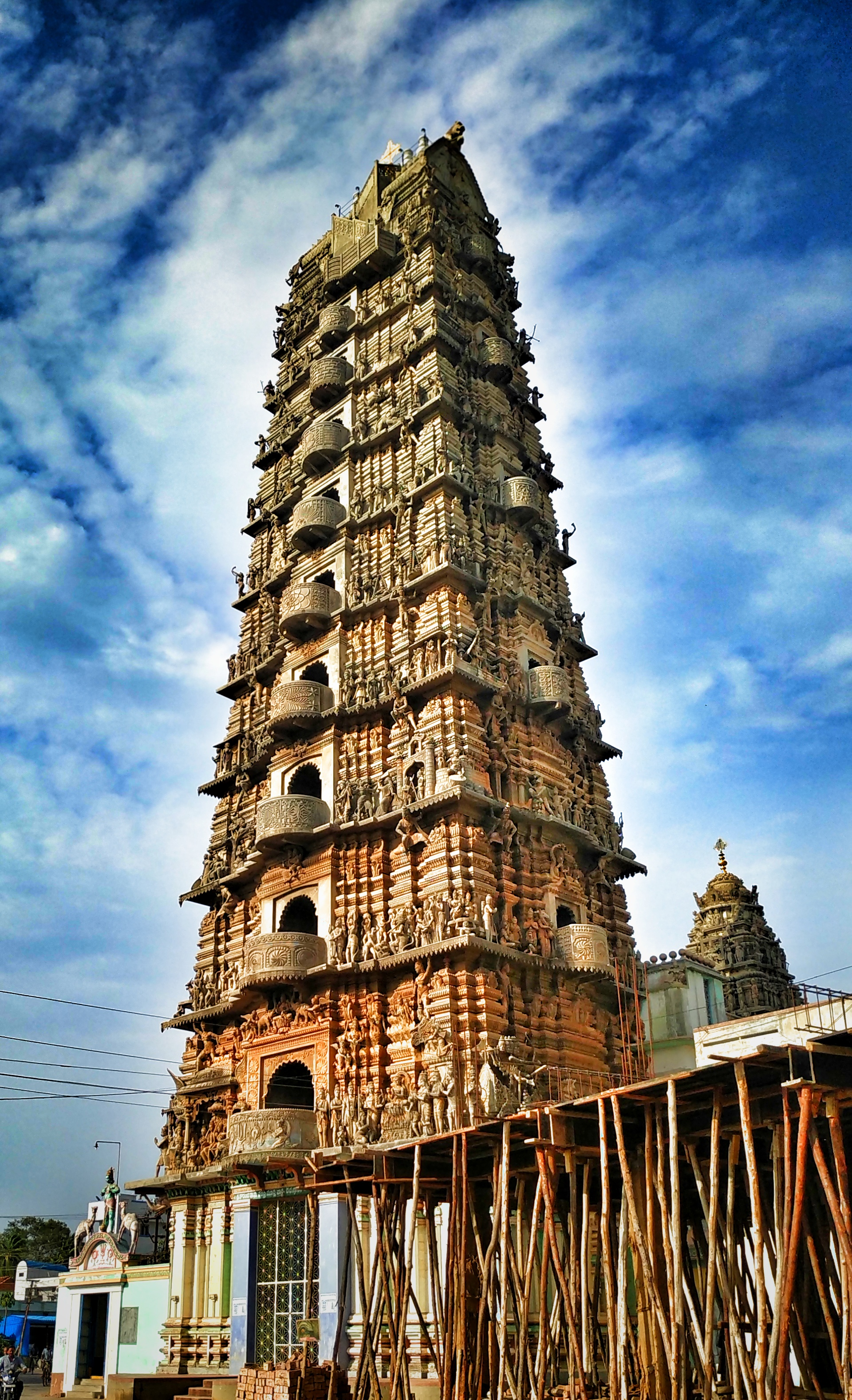

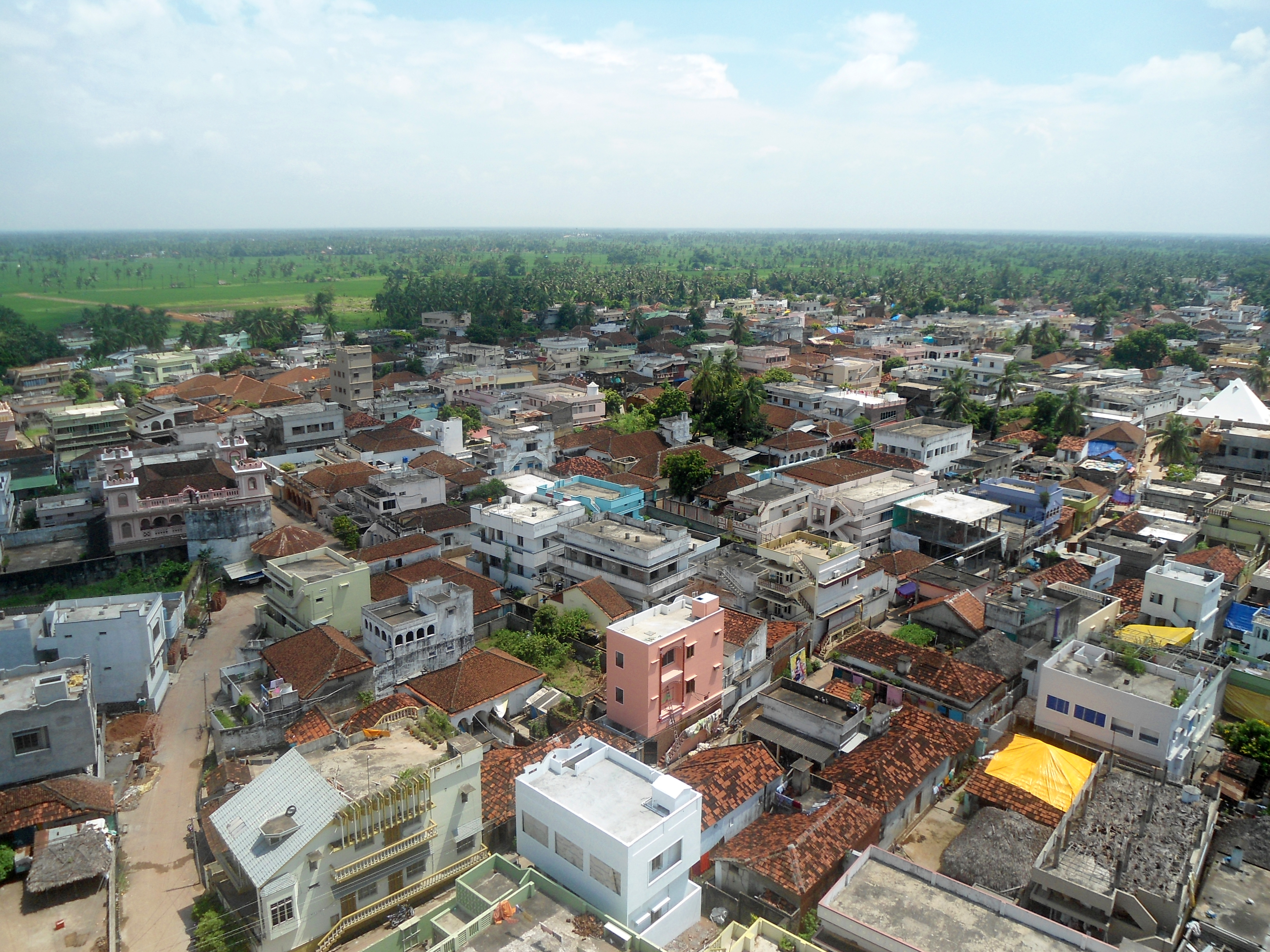
