= 2026 Andhra Pradesh fireworks explosion =

2026 fireworks explosion in Andhra Pradesh, India

- Date: 28 February 2026
- Time: c. 2:00 p.m. IST (GMT+5:30)
- Location: Surya Sri Fireworks Centre, Vetlapalem, Kakinada district, Andhra Pradesh, India; 17.03°N 82.14°E
- Type: Fireworks disaster
- Deaths: 21
- Injuries: 10

On 28 February 2026, at around 1:30–2:00 pm local time, an explosion occurred at the Surya Sri Fireworks factory in the Vetlapalem village, Kakinada district, Andhra Pradesh.

== Background ==
Vetlapalem is a fireworks manufacturing hub in Andhra Pradesh. The village is famous for its customised firecrackers specially crafted for local festivals, goddess fairs, and other local events. Several accidents had occurred in the past including one in 2019 that killed five women.

== Incident ==
The incident happened at the Surya Sri Fireworks factory beside the Godavari Canal in Vetlapalem village, Samarlakota mandal, Kakinada district, Andhra Pradesh. 10–15 people normally work there, but with a large order for the jathara in nearby Mallisala village, Jaggampeta mandal and the number of weddings, the demand for fireworks had increased and over 60 workers were on site. Ammunition is also stored in the warehouse. At 1 pm local time, everyone came out for lunch. After finishing their lunch at 1.30 pm, 30–40 of the workers went back to the four sheds and got busy with work. During this time, the explosion occurred and 20 workers were immediately killed, with a further death report after midnight. 10 others were seriously injured. Permission was originally given to employ only 8 people, but 31 were engaged in the work.

== See also ==
- List of fireworks accidents and incidents
