= Andrangi =

- village
- Interactive map of Andrangi
- Location in Andhra Pradesh, India Andrangi (India)
- Coordinates: 16.8075°N 82.1212°E
- Country: India
- State: Andhra Pradesh
- District: Kakinada
- Mandal: Kajuluru

Population (2017)
  - Total: 2,500

Languages
  - Official: Telugu
- Time zone: UTC+5:30 (IST)
- Postal code: 533 262

Andrangi is a village in Kajuluru mandal, Kakinada district in the state of Andhra Pradesh in India.

== Geography ==
Andrangi is located at 16.8075°N 82.1212°E.

== Demographics ==
As of Census 2011, Andrangi has population of 2056 of which 1035 were males while 1021 were females, sex ratio is 986. Population of child (age 0–6) was 202 which makes up 9.82% of total population of village. Literacy rate of the village was 60.84%.
