= Borrampalem =

Gandepalli
- Village
- Interactive map of Gandepalli
- Location in Andhra Pradesh, India Gandepalli (India)
- Country: India
- State: Andhra Pradesh
- District: Kakinada
- Mandal: Gandepalle

Languages
  - Official: Telugu
- Time zone: UTC+5:30 (IST)

Borrampalem is a village located in Gandepalle mandal, Kakinada district of Andhra Pradesh state in India. It is located on National Highway 16.

== Demographics ==
The local language is Telugu.

According to the 2011 census, the population of 1116 comprised 322 families. 579 were male and 537 female. The literacy rate was 58.52 per cent, compared to a state average of 67.02 per cent.
