= Chollangipeta =

Chollangi Peta or Chollangipeta is name of a place in Andhra Pradesh:

- Chollangi Peta, East Godavari
- Chollangipeta, Vizianagaram
