= Injaram =

- Village
- Interactive map of Injaram
- Location in Andhra Pradesh, India Injaram (India)
- Coordinates: 16°44′20″N 82°10′42″E
- Country: India
- State: Andhra Pradesh
- District: Kakinada district

Area
  - Total: 4.97 km^{2} (1.92 sq mi)

Population (2011)
  - Total: 4,722
  - Density: 950/km^{2} (2,460/sq mi)

Languages
  - Official: Telugu
- Time zone: UTC+5:30 (IST)
- PIN: 533464

Injaram is a village in Kakinada district of the Indian state of Andhra Pradesh State. It is located in Tallarevu mandal of Kakinada revenue division. The Kakinada district was recently formed in 2022 by carving out Kakinada and Peddapuram revenue divisions from East Godavari district. This village is located in the vicinity of Yanam which was an ex-French colony and now part of Puducherry Union Territory.

== History ==
=== Paragana during Muslim rule ===
During the rule of Qutb Shahis and Nizam it was a Paragana (Taluk) under the Circar (district) of Rajamundry, which was in turn part of Subah of Deccan of Mughal Empire. When the British set up a factory here they kept the name of Paragana to their establishment. Early British and French records mention that the original name of this place was Comprapollam, Kamprapalom, Cambrepalum (i.e. Kāpulapālem). Incidentally, Kapulapalem is the village situated next to Injaram towards east of it. Injaram Paragana was one of the 24 Paraganas of Rajahmundry Sarkar. It was name of a province (i.e. initially a Sthala and later a Pargana) during earlier times and referred as Vinjavaram, Vinjaram by natives during Gajapati rule, Ajiram, Wajiram by Muslim writers during Mughal and Nizam rule, and as Bingiron, (Note: This was mentioned in a 1652 map by a French cartographer Nicolas Sanson, who is known as father of French cartography.) Veneron, Injeram, Ingeram, Angerang and Ingiron by Europeans in the olden days. Injaram pargana was part of the Peddapuram Zamindary and the village of Injaram was a mootah (estate).

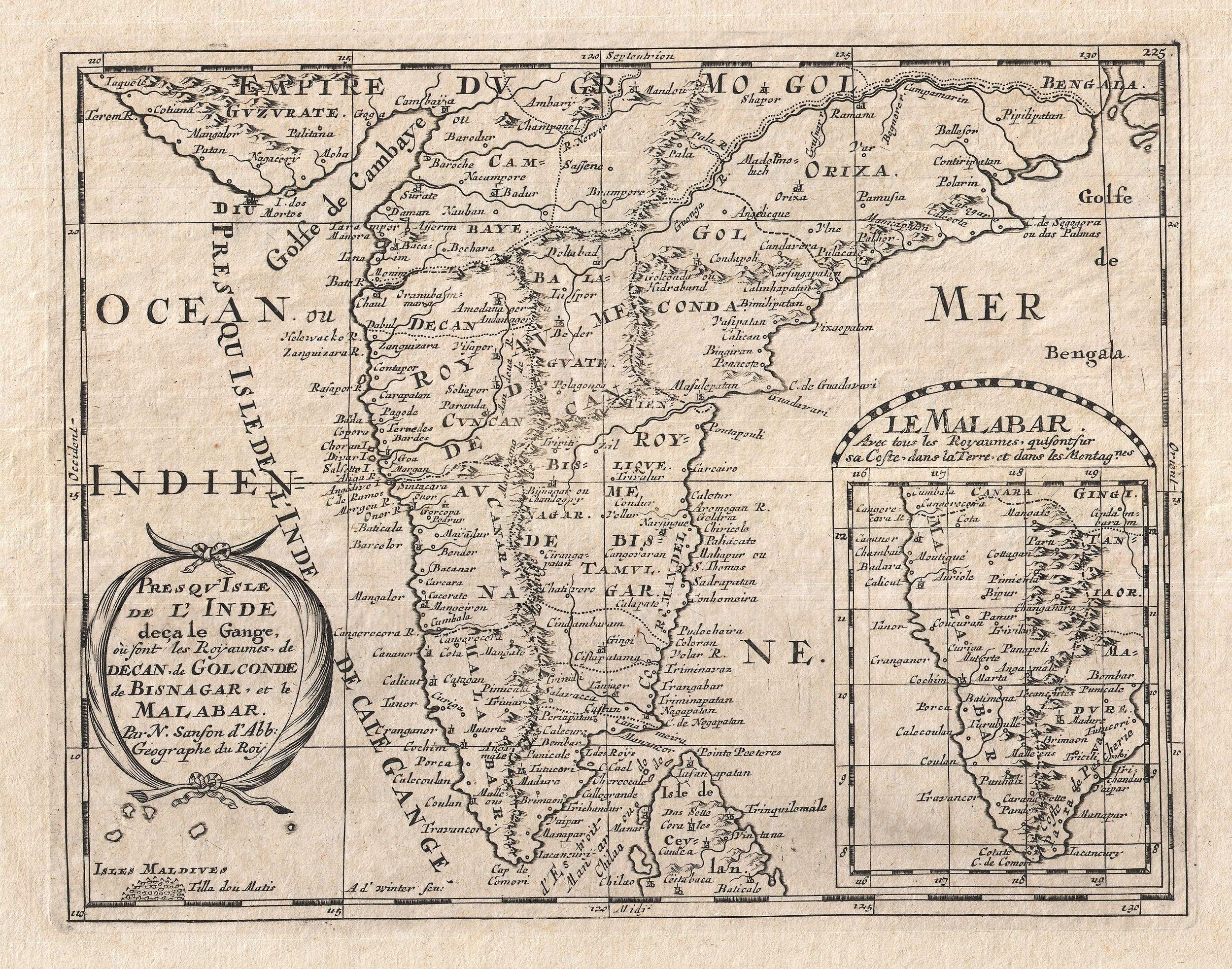
Injaram referred as Bingiron in a 1652 French Map of Indian peninsula by Nicolas Sanson. Injaram was named of Paragana during the Muslim rule.

=== Relation with Old Injaram ===
There is a local legend saying the Injaram and Patha (Old) Injaram were once united as one village and by the passage of time got split by Godavari river due to floods. Thus the Godavari passing between these two now referred as Gautami and the old passage being referred as Vriddha Gautami. Old Injaram village is now on the other bank of Gautami river within Island Polavalam mandal of Konaseema district. Interestingly, in early British records, the Injaram Paragana (district) was counted along with Muramalla village (now located on the other side of Gautami within Island Polavalam mandal) and said to have comprised 22 villages.

=== English colony ===
In 1708, the British government from Vizagapatam set up a factory in Injaram and settled at the village. However they abandoned soon afterwards and reestablished after few years in 1722. In 1757, under the French occupied it. But in 1759, the French after losing Machilipatnam, the Injaram factory fell back into the hands of the British. Weavers of the village worked for the Dutch and the British. In Injaram, finest quality of cloths were weaved in the country. After abolition of the factory, the prosperity of Injaram declined.

Around 1774, Injaram was one of the 30 divisions or mootahs (proprietary estates) that were very active in weaving industry. These villages were Mandapetaa, Doolah, Pasalapoody, Pundalapauka, Colavarocondah, Ventakapallam, Bandarlanka, Amalapuram, Peddapoody, Peddapatnam, Dungaroo (Dangeru), Rustumbadah, Tanuku; Chintaparty, Uppada, Hassanalibadah, Rajahmundry, Angarah, Arrivatum (Aryavatam), Coprepollam (i.e. Injaram), Dharmavaram, Relangi, Duvva, Tuni, Bheemavaram, Penumadam, Marteroo and three others

=== Relation with Yanam ===
The French records mention that they have established a lodge in Yanaon within the Paragana of Injaram, Rajamundry Sarkar in 1723 and Yanam remained under French rule until 1962.

== Demographics ==
As of 2011 census, Injaram had a population of 4,722. The total population constitute, 2,373 males and 2,349 females —a sex ratio of 990 females per 1000 males. 466 children are in the age group of 0–6 years, of which 245 are boys and 221 are girls. The average literacy rate stands at 66.54% with 2,832 literates, slightly lower than the state average of 67.41%.
