= P. Mallavaram =

P.Mallavaram Polekuru
- Village
- Interactive map of P.Mallavaram
- Coordinates: 16°45′38″N 82°14′23″E
- Country: India
- State: Andhra Pradesh
- District: Kakinada

Languages
  - Official: Telugu
- Time zone: UTC+5:30 (IST)
- Vehicle registration: AP

P. Mallavaram (Polekurru Mallavaram) is a village in Thallarevu mandal, located in Kakinada district of the Indian state of Andhra Pradesh.
