= Panasapadu =

- Village
- Interactive map of Panasapadu
- Location in Andhra Pradesh, India Panasapadu (India)
- Coordinates: 17.018543°N 82.234884°E
- Country: India
- State: Andhra Pradesh
- District: Kakinada

Languages
  - Official: Telugu
- Time zone: UTC+5:30 (IST)
- PIN: 533005

Panasapadu is a village adjacent to Samalkota-Kakinada Bypass Road situated in Kakinada district near Kakinada town, in Andhra Pradesh State.
