= Kajuluru =

- village
- Interactive map of Kajuluru
- Location in Andhra Pradesh, India Kajuluru (India)
- Coordinates: 16.796694°N 82.173314°E
- Country: India
- State: Andhra Pradesh
- District: Kakinada
- Talukas: Kajuluru

Population (2010)
  - Total: 12,000 approx.

Languages
  - Official: Telugu
- Time zone: UTC+5:30 (IST)
- PIN: 533468
- Telephone code: 0884
- Vehicle Registration: AP05 (Former); AP39 (from 30 January 2019)
- Vidhan Sabha constituency: Ramachandrapuram

Kajuluru is a village and a Mandal in Kakinada district in the state of Andhra Pradesh in India.

== Geography ==
Kajuluru is located at 16.47°N 82.10°E.
