= Madhavapatnam =

- Village
- Interactive map of Madhavapatnam
- Location in Andhra Pradesh, India Madhavapatnam (India)
- Coordinates: 16.99236°N 82.206989°E
- Country: India
- State: Andhra Pradesh
- Region: Kakinada
- District: Kakinada district

Population
  - Total: 7,081

Languages
  - Official: Telugu
- Time zone: UTC+5:30 (IST)
- PIN: 533005

Madhavapatnam is situated at a distance of 5 km from Kakinada town and lies in Kakinada district, in Andhra Pradesh State. It's a growing village from different parameters day by day its population is raising. 60% of the village natives occupation is agriculture and agriculture labour. mostly according caste wise this village is BC populated area. 30% percent of the people are Christians but none of them are registered as Christians for the govt policies.
