= A. Kothapalli =

A.Kothapalli
- Village
- Interactive map of A.Kothapalli
- Location in Andhra Pradesh, India A.Kothapalli (India)
- Coordinates: 17.094068°N 82.309915°E
- Country: India
- State: Andhra Pradesh
- District: Kakinada
- Mandal: Thondangi

Area
  - Total: 13.31 km^{2} (5.14 sq mi)

Population (2011)
  - Total: 8,604
  - Density: 646.4/km^{2} (1,674/sq mi)

Languages
  - Official: Telugu
- Time zone: UTC+5:30 (IST)
- PIN: 533408

A.Kothapalli is a village in of Kakinada district of the Indian state of Andhra Pradesh. It is located in Thondangi Mandal.

== Demography ==
As of the 2011 Census of India, A.Kothapalli has a total number of 2,118 houses and population of 8,604 of which include 4,291 males and 4,313 females. Literacy rate of A.Kothapalli is 55.46%, lower than state average of 67.02%. The population of children under the age of 6 years is 1,026 which is 11.92% of total population of A.Kothapalli, and child sex ratio is approximately 966, higher than Andhra Pradesh average of 939.
