= Sayyadwada =

- village
- Interactive map of Sayyadwada
- Location in Andhra Pradesh, India Sayyadwada (India)
- Coordinates: 16.8141°N 82.1648°E
- Country: India
- State: Andhra Pradesh
- District: Kakinada
- Named for: MUHARRAM & AYYAM E FATEMIYA

Population (2016)
  - Total: 608

Languages
  - Official: URDU
- Time zone: UTC+5:30 (IST)
- Nearest city: KAKINADA, KAJULURU MANDAL

Sayyadwada (Cheduvada) is a small Shia Muslims village in Kakinada district in the state of Andhra Pradesh, India. It is near the district headquarters Kakinada, about 25 km away. A Survey by Madras office in 1927 by Sri D.Venkatachalaayya Garu and LGB Firth included 'Cheduvada' in Cocanada Taluk. Cheduvada encompassed 330.00 acres and consisted of four ponds namely Mattakarra Cheruvu, Angulu Cheruvu, Ura Cheruvu and Pedda Cheruvu

== See also ==
- Kakinada district
