= Chollangi Peta, Kakinada district =

Chollangi Peta
- Village
- Interactive map of Chollangi Peta
- Location in Andhra Pradesh, India Chollangi Peta (India)
- Coordinates: 16.8742522°N 82.2338812°E
- Country: India
- State: Andhra Pradesh
- District: Kakinada

Languages
  - Official: Telugu
- Time zone: UTC+5:30 (IST)

Chollangi Peta is a village in Kakinada district of the Indian state of Andhra Pradesh. It is located in Thallarevu mandal.
