= Gandepalle =

Gandepalli
- Village
- Interactive map of Gandepalli
- Location in Andhra Pradesh, India Gandepalli (India)
- Coordinates: 17°05′01″N 81°55′17″E
- Country: India
- State: Andhra Pradesh
- District: Kakinada
- Talukas: Gandepalli

Languages
  - Official: Telugu
- Time zone: UTC+5:30 (IST)
- PIN: 533297
- Vehicle Registration: AP05 (Former); AP39 (from 30 January 2019)

Gandepalli is a village in Gandepalle mandal, located in Kakinada district of the Indian state of Andhra Pradesh.
