= Arempudi =

- Census Town
- Location in Andhra Pradesh, India
- Coordinates: 17.16216°N 81.23345°E
- Country: India
- State: Andhra Pradesh
- District: Kakinada

Area
  - Total: 7.02 km^{2} (2.71 sq mi)
- Elevation: 129 m (423 ft)

Population (2011)
  - Total: 5,073
  - Density: 723/km^{2} (1,870/sq mi)

Languages
  - Official: Telugu
- Time zone: UTC+5:30 (IST)

Arempudi is a census town in Kakinada district of the Indian state of Andhra Pradesh. It is located near Sankhavaram Mandal of Rampachodavaram revenue division.

== Geography ==
Arempudi is located near famous pilgrim centre Annavaram. It has an average elevation of 129 metres.

== Demographics ==
As of 2011 Census of India, Arempudi had a population of 5073. The total population constitute, 2537 males and 2536 females —a sex ratio of 1000 females per 1000 males. 584 children are in the age group of 0–6 years, with a sex ratio of 814 per 1000. The average literacy rate stands at 66.25%, significantly lower than the state average of 67.41%.
