= Nayakampalli =

Village in East Godavari, Andhra Pradesh, India

Nayakampalli is a village in Kakinada district, Andhra Pradesh, India.
