= Jaggampeta =

- Village
- Interactive map of Jaggampeta
- Location in Andhra Pradesh, India
- Coordinates: 17.1833°N 82.0500°E
- Country: India
- State: Andhra Pradesh
- District: Kakinada
- Established: 11th century AD
- Talukas: Jaggampeta

Government
  - MLA: Jyothula Nehru

Population (2011)
  - Total: 18,779

Languages
  - Official: Telugu
- Time zone: UTC+5:30 (IST)
- PIN: 533435
- Vehicle Registration: AP05 (Former); AP39 (from 30 January 2019)

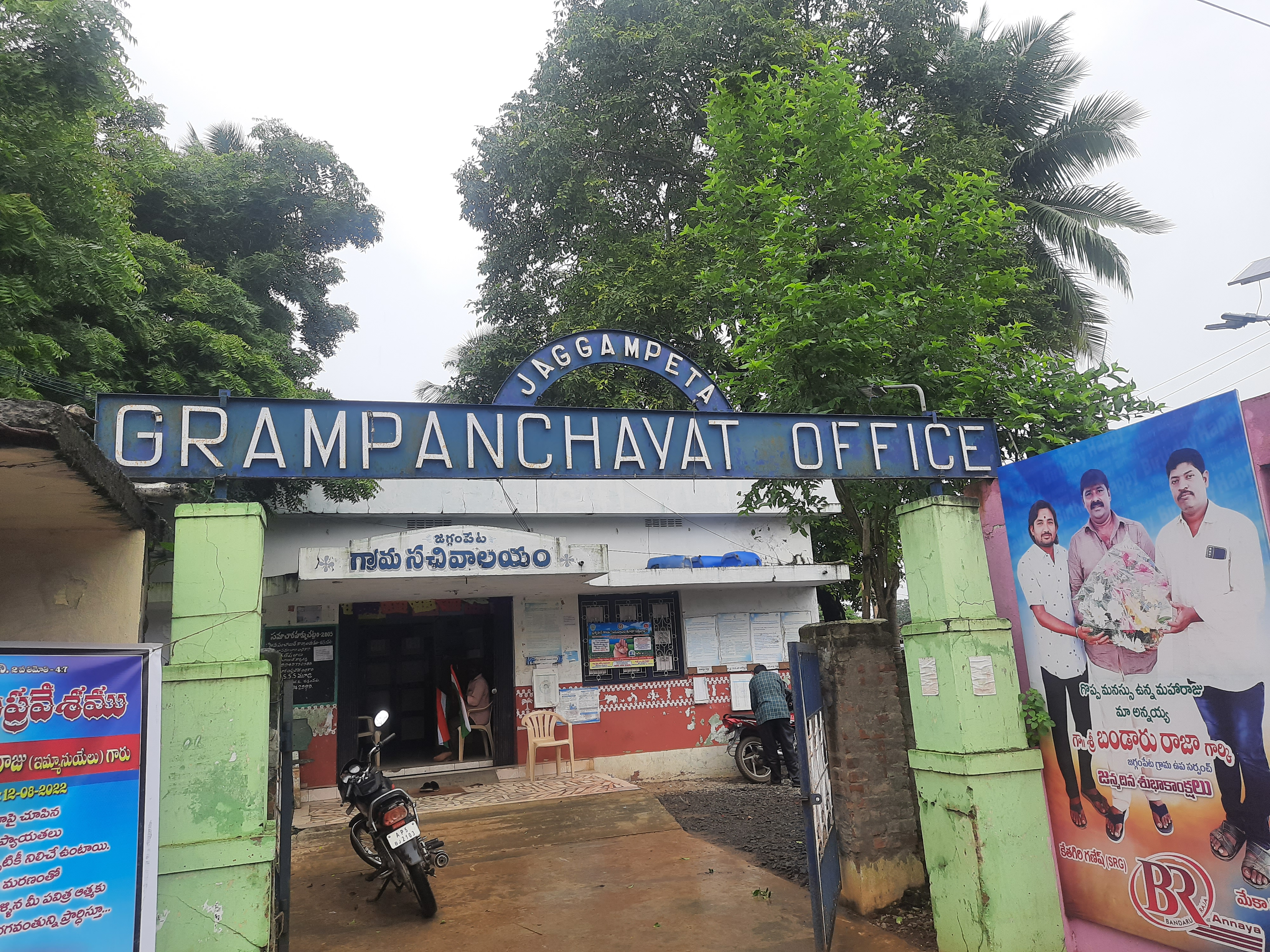

Jaggampeta is a village in Jaggampeta mandal, located in Kakinada district of the Indian state of Andhra Pradesh. The origin of the name Jaggampeta comes from the Lake Jaggama situated in the town. Jaggampeta is also called as "Mettaseema", "Uddandula kota" (Fort of Pipes), "The Gate of Agency", "The Entrance of Maredumilli Forests" and "The Center of East Godavari". Since the 18th century, British rule dominated this region in India, known for its thriving export of decorative tiles to Britain. Jaggampeta was once a hub of tile production. The town earned its nickname "Area of Tall Pipes" due to the record number of tall smoke towers that belonged to the many tile factories which dominated the landscape. A siren dating back to 20th century can be heard across a 1.5km radius everyday, which used to indicate working hours (6AM, 8AM, 12PM, 2PM, and 6PM) for the industrial workers. Despite the availability of modern clocks, the siren still rings five times a day as it used to, as a tradition, keeping the area connected to its past industrial roots.

Jaggampeta is also known for being a Landmark in Andhra Pradesh Politics. The name announcement ceremony of the YSR Congress Party was held in Jaggampeta.

== Geography ==
Jaggampeta is located at 17.1833°N 82.0500°E. It has an average elevation of 44 meters (148 feet)

== Governance ==
The civic body of Jaggampeta is going to be upgraded as municipal council..

== Transportation ==
Jaggampeta is located on NH 16. The nearest railway station to Jaggampeta is Samalkot railway station which is 20km away. The nearest airport to Jaggampeta is Rajahmundry Airport which 35km is away.

== Notable ==
Ravi Teja (Tollywood Actor).
