= Jalluru =

- Village
- Interactive map of Jalluru
- Location in Andhra Pradesh, India
- Coordinates: 17.0945°N 82.1965°E
- Country: India
- State: Andhra Pradesh
- District: Kakinada
- Mandal: Pithapuram

Languages
  - Official: Telugu
- Time zone: UTC+5:30 (IST)
- PIN: 533433
- Vehicle registration: AP 05
- Website: Jalluru.weebly.com

Jalluru is a village in the Kakinada district of Andhra Pradesh, India. It is part of Pithapuram Mandal, though it was once part of Pithapuram Estate.
