= Kirlampudi mandal =

- Mandal
- Interactive map of Kirlampudi mandal
- Country: India
- State: Andhra Pradesh
- District: Kakinada

Area
  - Total: 87.33 km^{2} (33.72 sq mi)
- Time zone: UTC+5:30 (IST)

Kirlampudi mandal is one of the 21 mandals in Kakinada District of Andhra Pradesh. As per census 2011, there are 17 villages.

== Demographics ==
Kirlampudi Mandal has total population of 74,379 as per the Census 2011 out of which 37,255 are males while 37,124 are females and the average sex Ratio of Kirlampudi Mandal is 996. The total literacy rate of Kirlampudi Mandal is 61.43%. The male literacy rate is 55.78% and the female literacy rate is 53.47%.

== Villages ==
Bhupalapatnam	2894
Burugupudi	8180
Chillangi	3998
Geddanapalle	4,711
Goneda	4,475
Jagapathinagaram	7,998
Kirlampudi	9,609
Krishnavaram	2,423
Mukkollu	2,617
Rajupalem	2,155
Ramakrishnapuram	1,408
S. Thimmapuram	2,058
Somavaram	4,249
Sungarayunipalem	3,088
Thamarada	5,174
Veeravaram	5,617
Velanka	4,120

== See also ==
- List of mandals in Andhra Pradesh
