= Suryanarayana Swamy Temple, Gollala Mamidada =

Surya temple in Andhra Pradesh, India

Sri Suryanarayana Swamy Temple
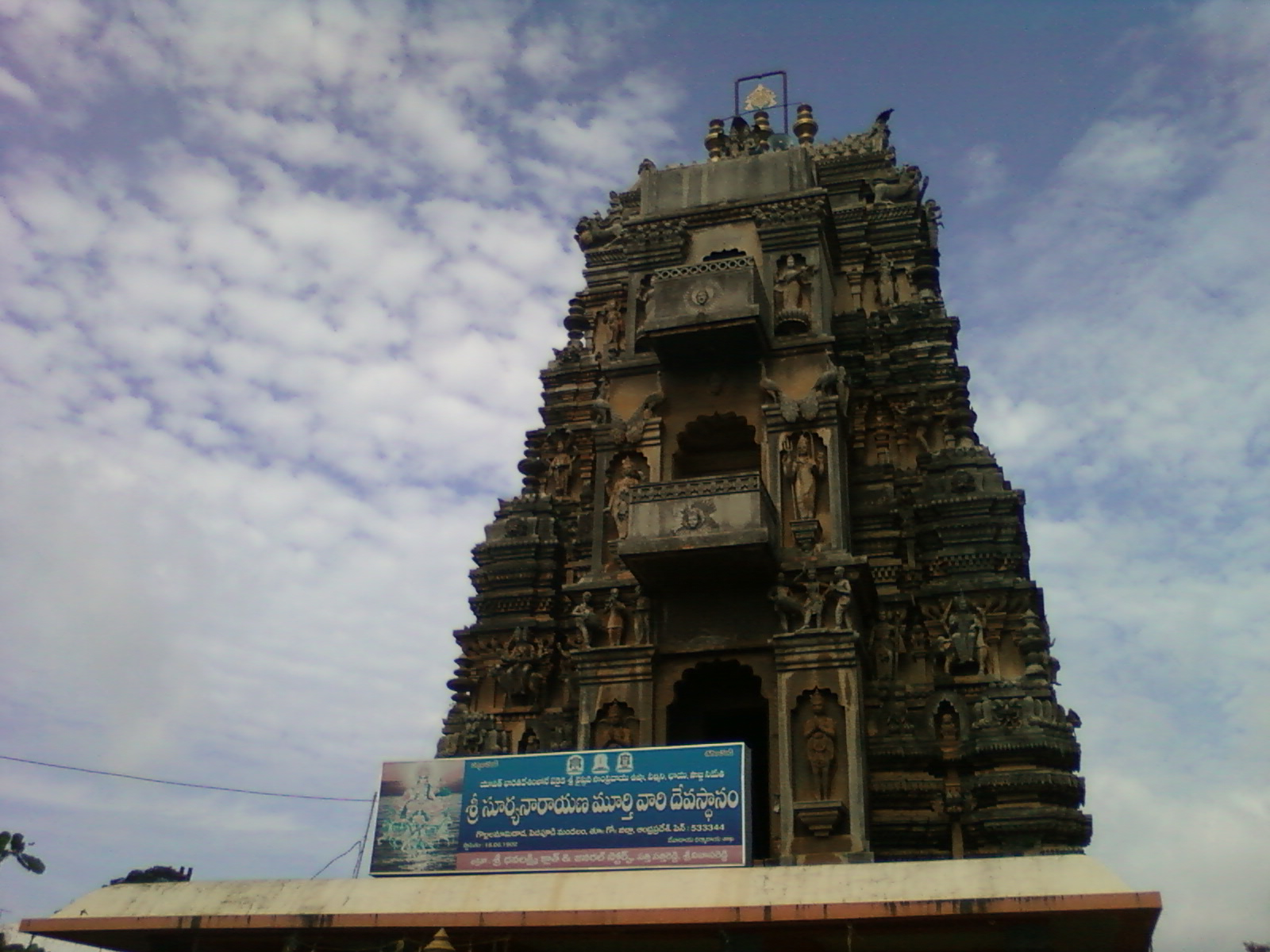

Religion
- Affiliation: Hinduism
- District: Kakinada

Location
- Location: Gollala Mamidada
- State: Andhra Pradesh
- Country: India

Architecture
- Established: 1920

Website
- https://srisuryanarayanaswamydevasthanamgmamidada.org/index.html

Sri Suryanarayana Swami Temple is a Sun temple situated in Gollala Mamidada village in Kakinada district of Andhra Pradesh, India. Gollalamamidada Sun temple and other Temples are built by Peddapuram Kings of Vatsavayi Dynasty. river amongst 16 acres of grass fields and coconut palms. The temple is 20 km (12 mi) from Kakinada and 58 km (36 mi) away from Rajahmundry. Some of the rites and festivals performed include Archanas, Abhishekams, Ratha Saptami, and Ekadasi.
