= Kotananduru mandal =

- Mandal
- Interactive map of Kotananduru mandal
- Country: India
- State: Andhra Pradesh
- District: Kakinada

Area
  - Total: 114.84 km^{2} (44.34 sq mi)
- Time zone: UTC+5:30 (IST)

Kotananduru mandal is one of the 21 mandals in Kakinada District of Andhra Pradesh. As per census 2011, there are 14 villages.

== Demographics ==
Kotananduru Mandal total population of 48,512 as per the Census 2011 out of which 24,096 are males while 24,416 are females and the Average Sex Ratio of Kotananduru Mandal is 1,013. The total literacy rate of Kotananduru Mandal is 54.43%. The male literacy rate is 55.32% and the female literacy rate is 42.17%.

== Towns and villages ==
=== Villages ===
1. Allipudi
2. Bhimavarapukota
3. Billananduru
4. Boddavaram
5. Indugapalle
6. K. E. Chinnayyapalem
7. Kakarapalle
8. Kamatam Mallavaram
9. Koppaka Agraharam
10. Kotananduru
11. Patha Kottam
12. Kotha Kottam
13. Lakshmi devi peta
14. Surapurajupeta
15. Appalarajupeta
16. Thatipaka Jagan Nadha Nagaram
17. K S Kothuru
18. Timmarajupeta
19. Sanagavaka

== See also ==
- jagannadhapuram
- List of mandals in Andhra Pradesh
