= S. Thimmapuram =

Village in Andhra Pradesh, India

Coordinates: 17°11′48″N 82°08′18″E

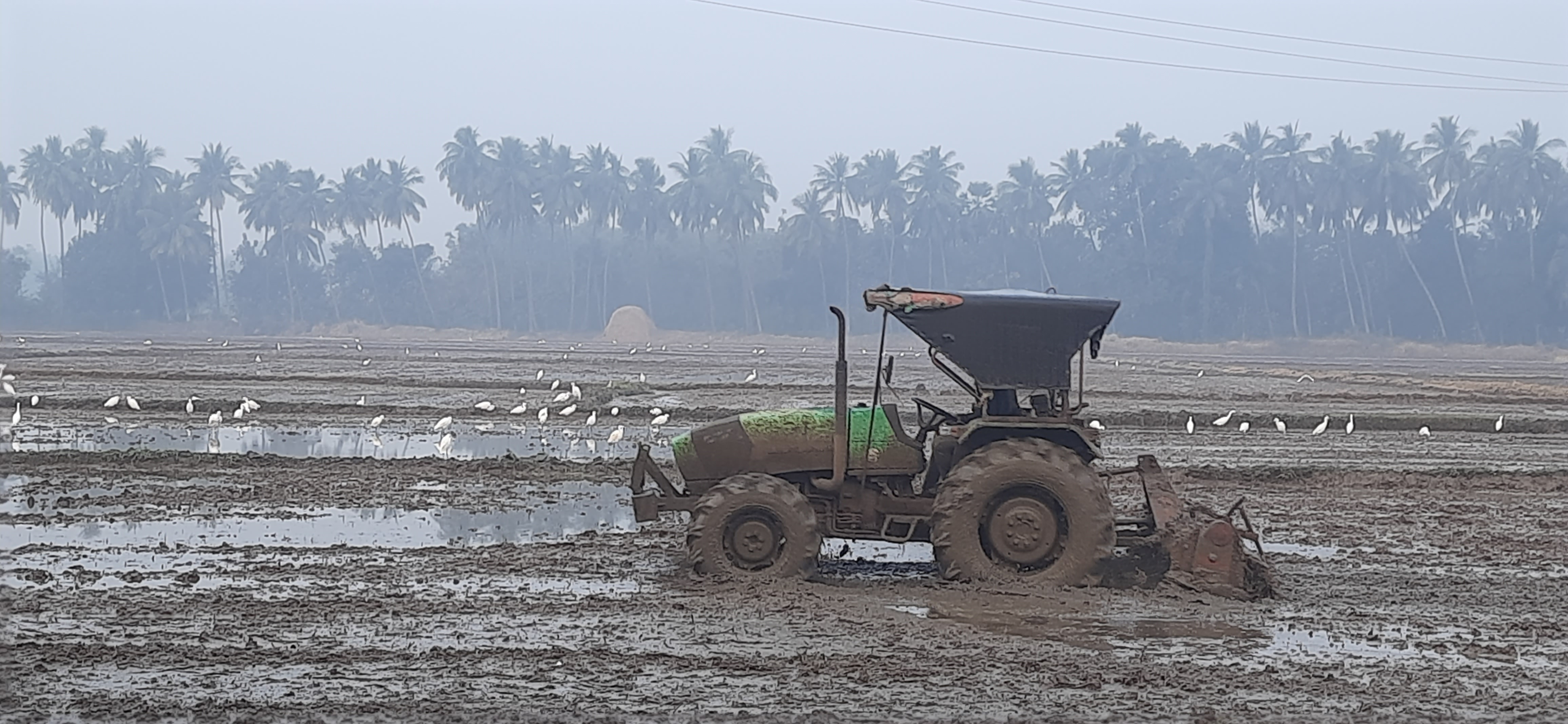
Mornings in S.Thimmapuram village

S.Thimmapuram is a small village in Kirlampudi mandal in Kakinada district, Andhra Pradesh, India. Its population is approximately 2000.
