= Kotananduru =

- village
- Interactive map of Kotananduru
- Location in Andhra Pradesh, India Kotananduru (India)
- Coordinates: 17.4667°N 82.4667°E
- Country: India
- State: Andhra Pradesh
- District: Kakinada
- Elevation: 37 m (121 ft)

Languages
  - Official: Telugu
- Time zone: UTC+5:30 (IST)
- Vehicle Registration: AP05 (Former); AP39 (from 30 January 2019)

Kota-nand-uru is a village in Kakinada district in the state of Andhra Pradesh in India.

== Geography ==
Kotananduru is located at 17.4667°N 82.4667°E. It has an average elevation of 37 meters (124 feet).
