= Goneda =

Coordinates: 17°10′N 82°07′E

- village
- Interactive map of Goneda
- Country: India
- State: Andhra Pradesh
- District: Kakinada

Government
  - Body: Jaggampeta

Population
  - Total: 5,000

Languages
  - Official: Telugu
- Time zone: UTC+5:30 (IST)
- PIN: 533437
- Vehicle registration: AP
- Literacy: 70 -90%
- Lok Sabha constituency: Kakinada
- Vidhan Sabha constituency: Jaggampeta
- Civic agency: Jaggampeta

Goneda is a village in Kirlampudi mandal, Kakinada district, within the state of Andhra Pradesh, India.
