= Sankhavaram mandal =

Sankhavaram Mandal
- Mandal
- Interactive Map Outlining mandal
- Country: India
- State: Andhra Pradesh
- District: Kakinada

Area
  - Total: 137.41 km^{2} (53.05 sq mi)
- Time zone: UTC+5:30 (IST)

Sankhavaram Mandal is one of the 21 mandals in Kakinada district of Andhra Pradesh. As per census 2011, the mandal comprises one town and 29 villages.

== Demographics ==
Sankhavaram Mandal has total population of 57,017 as per the Census 2011 out of which 28,575 are males while 28,442 are females and the Average Sex Ratio of Sankhavaram Mandal is 995. The total literacy rate of Sankhavaram Mandal is 59.85%. The male literacy rate is 56.71% and the female literacy rate is 49.78%.

== Towns and villages ==
=== Towns ===
- Arempudi

=== Villages ===
- Ammirekhala
- Ankampalem
- Annavaram
- Anumarthi
- Atchampeta
- Avethi
- Dhara Mallapuram
- Gondhi Sankhavaram
- Gondhi Kothapalle
- Gowrampeta
- Jagannadhapuram
- Jaggampeta
- Kathipudi
- Konthangi
- Mandapam
- Masampalle
- Nellipudi
- Ondregula
- Pedamallapuram
- Polavaram
- Rajaram
- Sankhavaram
- Seethayampeta
- Siddivaripalem
- Srungadhara
- Vadrevu Venkatapuram
- Vazrakutam
- Velangi
- Yarakapuram

== See also ==
- List of mandals in Andhra Pradesh
