= Thondangi mandal =

Thondangi
- Mandal
- Interactive Map Outlining mandal
- Country: India
- State: Andhra Pradesh
- District: Kakinada

Area
  - Total: 176.62 km^{2} (68.19 sq mi)
- Time zone: UTC+5:30 (IST)

Thondangi mandal is one of the 21 mandals in Kakinada district of Andhra Pradesh. As per census 2011, there are 15 villages.

== Demographics ==
Thondangi mandal has total population of 87,592 as per the Census 2011 out of which 44,412 are males while 43,180 are females and the average sex ratio of the mandal is 972. The total literacy rate of the mandal is 55.67%. The male literacy rate is 53.68% and the female literacy rate is 45.12%.

== Towns and villages ==
=== Villages ===
- A. Kothapalli
- A.V.Nagaram
- Anuru
- Bendapudi
- Gopalapatnam
- Kommanapalle
- Kona Forest
- Krishnapuram
- P. Agraharam
- P.E.Chinnayapalem
- Pydikonda
- Ravikampadu
- Srungavruksham
- Thondangi
- Vemavaram

== See also ==
- List of mandals in Andhra Pradesh
