= Kakinada Urban mandal =

- Mandal
- Interactive map of Kakinada Urban mandal
- Location in Andhra Pradesh, India
- Coordinates: 16.9437°N 82.2350°E
- Country: India
- State: Andhra Pradesh
- District: Kakinada
- Headquarters: Kakinada

Area
  - Total: 31.95 km^{2} (12.34 sq mi)

Population (2011)
  - Total: 312,538
  - Density: 9,782/km^{2} (25,340/sq mi)

Languages
  - Official: Telugu
- Time zone: UTC+5:30 (IST)

Kakinada Urban mandal is one of the 21 mandals in Kakinada district of the state of Andhra Pradesh, India. It has its headquarters at Kakinada city, that covers the entire mandal. The mandal is surrounded by Kakinada (rural) mandal and lies on the coast of Bay of Bengal.

== Demographics ==
As of 2011 census, the mandal had a population of 312,538. The total population constitute, 152,571 males and 159,967 females —a sex ratio of 1049 females per 1000 males. 29,698 children are in the age group of 0–6 years, of which 15,041 are boys and 14,657 are girls —a ratio of 975 per 1000. The average literacy rate stands at 80.62% with 228,034 literates.

== Towns and villages ==
Kakinada (urban) mandal consists of only one town of Kakinada and has no villages and hence, it is a fully urban mandal.
