= Chollangipeta, Vizianagaram district =

Chollangipeta
- village
- Interactive map of Chollangipeta
- Location in Andhra Pradesh, India Chollangipeta (India)
- Coordinates: 18.1071649°N 83.4883578°E
- Country: India
- State: Andhra Pradesh
- District: Vizianagaram

Languages
  - Official: Telugu
- Time zone: UTC+5:30 (IST)
- Climate: hot (Köppen)

Chollangipeta is a village in Denkada Mandal of Vizianagaram district, Andhra Pradesh, India.

== Demographics ==
As of 2001 Indian census, the demographic details of this village is as follows:

- Total Population: 1,310 in 310 Households
- Male Population: 667
- Female Population: 643
- Children Under 6-years of age: 176 (Boys - 89 and Girls - 87)
- Total Literates: 572
