= Prathipadu mandal, Kakinada district =

Prathipadu mandal
- Mandal
- Interactive Map Outlining mandal
- Country: India
- State: Andhra Pradesh
- District: Kakinadai

Area
  - Total: 180.94 km^{2} (69.86 sq mi)
- Time zone: UTC+5:30 (IST)

Prathipadu mandal is one of the 21 mandals in Kakinada District of Andhra Pradesh. As per census 2011, there are 36 villages.

== Demographics ==
Prathipadu Mandal has total population of 79,076 as per the Census 2011 out of which 39,501 are males while 39,575 are females. The Average Sex Ratio of Prathipadu Mandal is 1,002. The total literacy rate of Prathipadu Mandal is 57.1%. The male literacy rate is 52.17% and the female literacy rate is 48.85%.

== Towns and villages ==
Prathipadu town.

=== Villages ===
1. Bapannadhara
2. Bavuruvaka
3. Buradakota
4. China Sankarlapudi
5. Chintaluru
6. Dharmavaram
7. Doparthi
8. Gajjanapudi
9. Girijanapuram
10. Gokavaram
11. K. Mirthivada
12. Kondapalle
13. Kothuru
14. Lampakalova
15. Mettu Chintha
16. P. Jagannadhapuram
17. Pandavulapalem
18. Peda Sankarlapudi
19. Peddipalem
20. Podurupaka
21. Pothuluru
22. Rachapalle
23. Sarabhavaram
24. Thaduvai
25. Thotapalle
26. U. Jagannadhapuram
27. Uligogila
28. Uttarakanchi
29. Vakapalle
30. Vanthada
31. Vemulapalem
32. Venkatanagaram
33. Vommangi
34. Yeluru
35. Yerakampalem

=== Towns ===
1. Prathipadu

== See also ==
- List of mandals in Andhra Pradesh
