= Pithapuram mandal =

- Mandal
- Interactive Map Outlining mandal
- Country: India
- State: Andhra Pradesh
- District: Kakinada
- Time zone: UTC+5:30 (IST)

Pithapuram mandal is one of the 21 mandals in Kakinada district of Andhra Pradesh. As per the national census of 2011, there is 1 city and 22 villages.

== Demographics ==
Pithapuram Mandal has total population of 129,282 as per the Census 2011 out of which 64,906 are males while 64,376 are females and the average Sex Ratio of Pithapuram Mandal is 992. The total literacy rate of Pithapuram Mandal is 68.03%. The male literacy rate is 63.29% and the female literacy rate is 58.84%.

== CITY'S and villages ==
=== CITY ===
1. Pithapuram (Municipality)

=== Villages ===
1. Agraharam
2. B. Kothuru
3. Bhogapuram
4. Chitrada
5. Fakruddinpalem
6. Gokivada
7. Govindarajupalem
8. Jagapathirajapuram
9. Jalluru
10. Jamulapalle
11. Kandarada
12. Kolanka
13. kotha kolanka(kotturu)
14. Madhavapuram
15. Mallam
16. Mangiturthi
17. Navakandravada
18. Pro. Donthamuru
19. Pro. Rayavaram
20. Raparthi
21. Veldurthi
22. Virava
23. Viravada

== See also ==
- List of mandals in Andhra Pradesh
