= Samalkota mandal =

- Mandal
- Interactive Map Outlining mandal
- Country: India
- State: Andhra Pradesh
- District: Kakinada

Area
  - Total: 146.64 km^{2} (56.62 sq mi)
- Time zone: UTC+5:30 (IST)

Samalkota mandal part of Peddapuram revenue division is one of the 21 mandals in Kakinada district of Andhra Pradesh. As per the 2012 census, the mandal is composed of one town and 17 villages.

== Demographics ==
Samalkota Mandal has a total population of 137,979 as per the 2011 census. The total literacy rate of Samalkota Mandal is 69.39%. The male literacy rate is 64.9% and the female literacy rate is 59.66%.

== Towns and villages ==
=== Towns ===
1. Samalkota (Municipality)

=== Villages ===
1. Achampeta
2. Boyanapudi
3. G.Medapadu
4. Jaggammagaripeta
5. Kapavaram
6. Koppavaram
7. Madhavapatnam
8. Mamilladoddi
9. Navara
10. P.Vemavaram
11. Panasapadu
12. Pandravada
13. Pavara
14. Pedabrahmadevam
15. Unduru
16. Valluru
17. Venkata Krishnarayapuram
18. Vetlapalem

== See also ==
- List of mandals in Andhra Pradesh
