= Yeleswaram mandal =

- Mandal
- Interactive Map Outlining mandal
- Country: India
- State: Andhra Pradesh
- District: Kakinada

Area
  - Total: 121.3 km^{2} (46.8 sq mi)
- Time zone: UTC+5:30 (IST)

Yeleswaram mandal is one of the 21 mandals in Kakinada District of Andhra Pradesh. As per census 2011, there are 13 villages.

== Demographics ==
Yeleswaram Mandal has total population of 77,965 as per the Census 2011 out of which 38,471 are males while 39,494 are females and the Average Sex Ratio of Yeleswaram Mandal is 1,027. The total literacy rate of Yeleswaram Mandal is 62.86%. The male literacy rate is 58.42% and the female literacy rate is 53.25%.

== Towns and villages ==
=== Villages ===
- Bhadravaram
- East Lakshmipuram
- J. Annavaram
- Lakkavaram
- Lingamparthi
- Marriveedu
- Peddanapalle
- Peravaram
- Ramanayyapeta
- Siripuram
- Tirumali
- Kambalapalem
- Yeleswaram
- Yerravaram

== See also ==
- List of mandals in Andhra Pradesh
