= Gandepalle mandal =

- Mandal
- Interactive map of Gandepalle mandal
- Country: India
- State: Andhra Pradesh
- District: Kakinada

Area
  - Total: 165.44 km^{2} (63.88 sq mi)
- Time zone: UTC+5:30 (IST)

Gandepalle mandal is one of the 21 mandals in Kakinada District of Andhra Pradesh. As per census 2011, there are 13 villages.

== Demographics ==
Gandepalle Mandal has total population of 54,278 as per the Census 2011 out of which 27,075 are males while 27,203 are females and the average Sex Ratio of Gandepalle Mandal is 1,005. The total literacy rate of Gandepalle Mandal is 59.69%. The male literacy rate is 54.88% and the female literacy rate is 52.21%.

== Towns and villages ==
=== Villages ===
1. Borrampalem
2. Gandepalle
3. Mallepalle
4. Murari
5. North Tirupathi Rajapuram
6. P.Nayakampalle
7. Pro. Ragampeta
8. Singarampalem
9. Surampalem
10. Talluru
11. Uppalapadu
12. Yellamilli
13. Yerrampalem

== See also ==
- List of mandals in Andhra Pradesh
