= Thallarevu mandal =

Thallarevu Mandal
- Mandal
- Interactive Map Outlining mandal
- Country: India
- State: Andhra Pradesh
- District: Kakinada

Area
  - Total: 414.75 km^{2} (160.14 sq mi)
- Time zone: UTC+5:30 (IST)

Thallarevu Mandal is one of the 21 mandals in Kakinada district of Andhra Pradesh. As per census 2011, there are 13 villages.

== Demographics ==
Thallarevu Mandal has total population of 82,799 as per the Census 2011 out of which 41,438 are males while 41,361 are females and the Average Sex Ratio of Thallarevu Mandal is 998. The total literacy rate of Thallarevu Mandal is 70.58%. The male literacy rate is 66.13% and the female literacy rate is 59.49%.

== Towns and villages ==
=== Villages ===
1. Chollangi
2. Chollangi Peta
3. G. Vemavaram
4. Injaram
5. Koringa
6. Latchipalem
7. Neelapalle
8. P. Mallavaram
9. Patavala
10. Pillanka
11. Polekurru
12. Sunkarapalem
13. Uppangala
14. gadimoga

== See also ==
- List of mandals in Andhra Pradesh
