= Jaggampeta mandal =

- Mandal
- Interactive map of Jaggampeta mandal
- Country: India
- State: Andhra Pradesh
- District: Kakinada

Area
  - Total: 160.59 km^{2} (62.00 sq mi)
- Time zone: UTC+5:30 (IST)

Jaggampeta mandal is one of the 21 mandals in Kakinada District of Andhra Pradesh. As per census 2011, there are 19 villages.

== Towns and villages ==
=== Villages ===
1. Balabhadrapuram
2. Gollalagunta
3. Govindapuram
4. Gurrappalem
5. Irripaka
6. J. Kothuru
7. Jaggampeta
8. Kandregula
9. Katravulapalle
10. Mallisala
11. Mamidada
12. Manyanvaripalem
13. Marripaka
14. Narendrapatnam
15. Rajapudi
16. Ramavaram
17. Seethampeta
18. Seethanagaram
19. Tirupatirajupeta
20. sriramnagar

== See also ==
- List of mandals in Andhra Pradesh
