= Pedapudi mandal =

- Mandal
- Interactive Map Outlining mandal
- Country: India
- State: Andhra Pradesh
- District: Kakinada district

Area
  - Total: 106.62 km^{2} (41.17 sq mi)
- Time zone: UTC+5:30 (IST)

Pedapudi mandal is one of the 21 mandals in Kakinada District of Andhra Pradesh. As per a census held in 2011, there are 17 villages in Pedapudi mandal.

== Demographics ==
Pedapudi Mandal has a total population of 71,459 as per the 2011 census. 35,883 are males and 35,576 are females. The total literacy rate of Pedapudi Mandal is 70.61%. The male literacy rate is 65.82% and the female literacy rate is 61.57%.

== Towns and villages ==
=== Villages ===
1. Atchutapuratrayam
2. Chintapalle
3. Domada
4. G. Mamidada
5. Gandredu
6. Kaikavolu
7. Kandregula
8. Karakuduru
9. Kumarapriyam
10. Pedapudi
11. Peddada
12. Puttakonda
13. Pyna
14. Rajupalem
15. Sahapuram
16. Sampara
17. Vendra

== See also ==
- List of mandals in Andhra Pradesh
