= Kajuluru mandal =

- Mandal
- Interactive map of Kajuluru mandal
- Location in Andhra Pradesh, India
- Coordinates: 16.796694°N 82.173314°E
- Country: India
- State: Andhra Pradesh
- District: Kakinada
- Headquarters: Kajuluru

Area
  - Total: 116.69 km^{2} (45.05 sq mi)

Population (2011)
  - Total: 70,903
  - Density: 607.62/km^{2} (1,573.7/sq mi)
- Demonym

Languages
  - Official: Telugu
- Time zone: UTC+5:30 (IST)

Kajuluru mandal is one of the 21 mandals in Kakinada district of the state of Andhra Pradesh, India. It has its headquarters at Kajuluru town. The mandal is bounded by Ramachandrapuram, Karapa, Thallarevu and Pamarru mandals.

== Demographics ==
As of 2011 census, the mandal had a population of 70,903. The total population constitute, 35,825 males and 35,078 females —a sex ratio of 979 females per 1000 males. 7,331 children are in the age group of 0–6 years, of which 3,744 are boys and 3,587 are girls —a ratio of 958 per 1000. The average literacy rate stands at 69.04% with 43,890 literates. Kajuluru is the most populated village and Tanumalla is the least populated village in the mandal.

== Villages ==
Kajuluru mandal consists of 26 villages. The following are the list of villages in the mandal:

1. Tanukuvada
2. Tipparajupalem
3. T.Mamidada
4. Andrangi
5. Aryavatam
6. Bandanapudi
7. Cheduvada
8. Duggudurru
9. Gollapalem
10. Ithapudi
11. Jagannathagiri
12. Kajuluru
13. Kolanka
14. Kuyyeru
15. Manjeru
16. Mathukumilli
17. Pallipalem
18. Penumalla
19. Seela
20. Selapaka
21. Tanumalla
22. Tarlampudi
23. Uppumilli

Sources:

- Census India 2011 (sub districts)
- Revenue Department of AP
