= Kakinada district =

District in Andhra Pradesh, India

- District of Andhra Pradesh
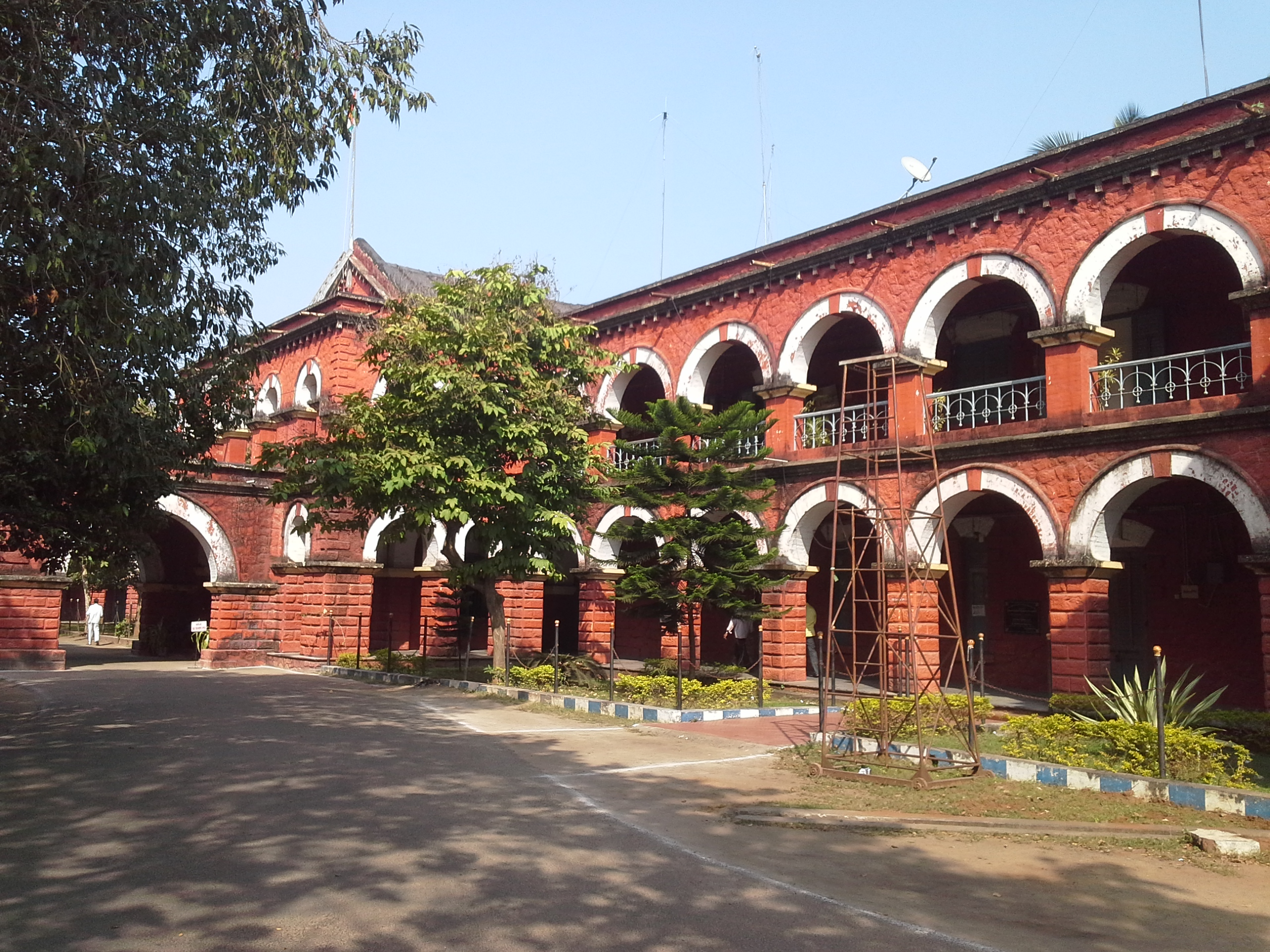
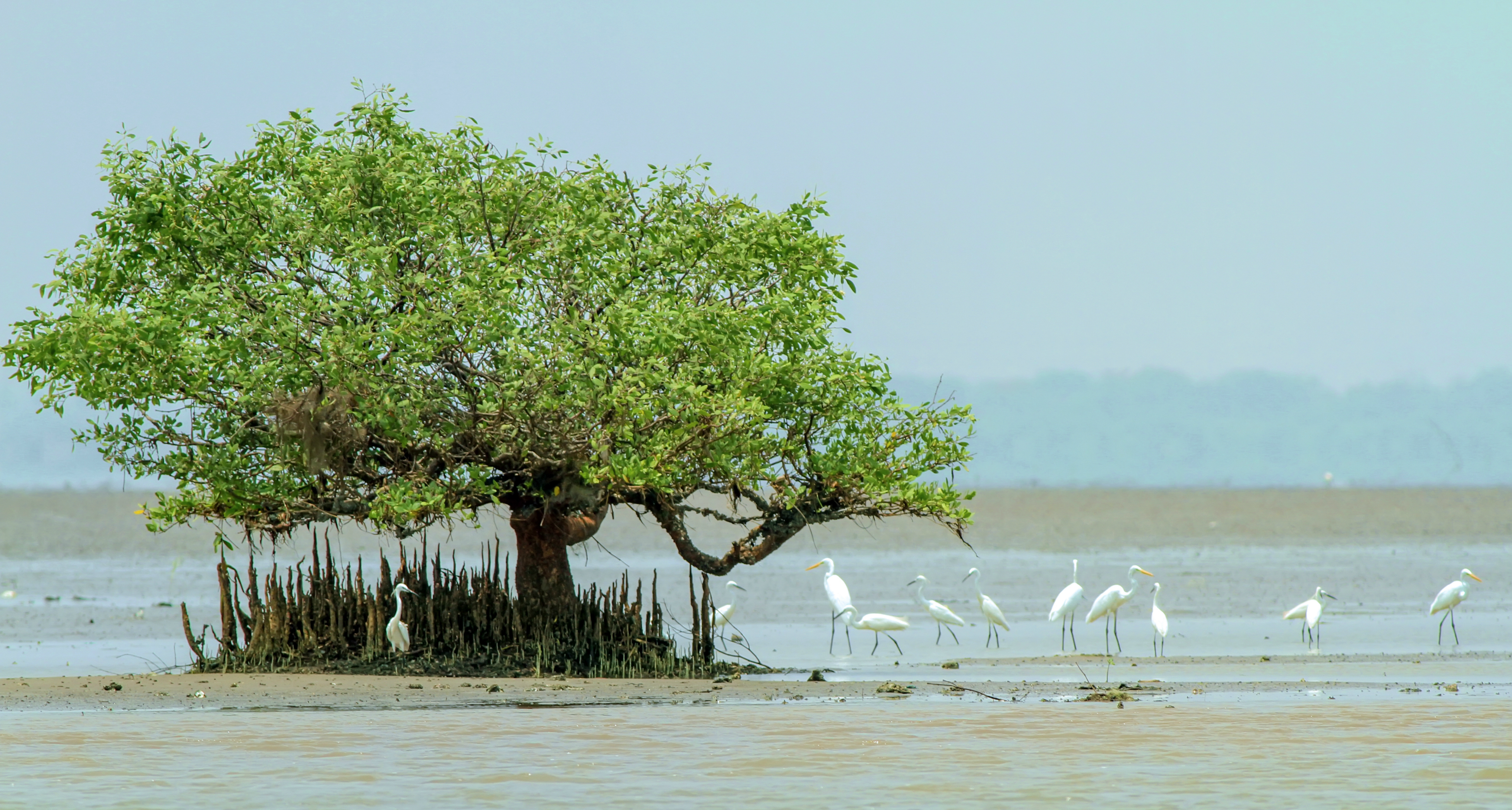
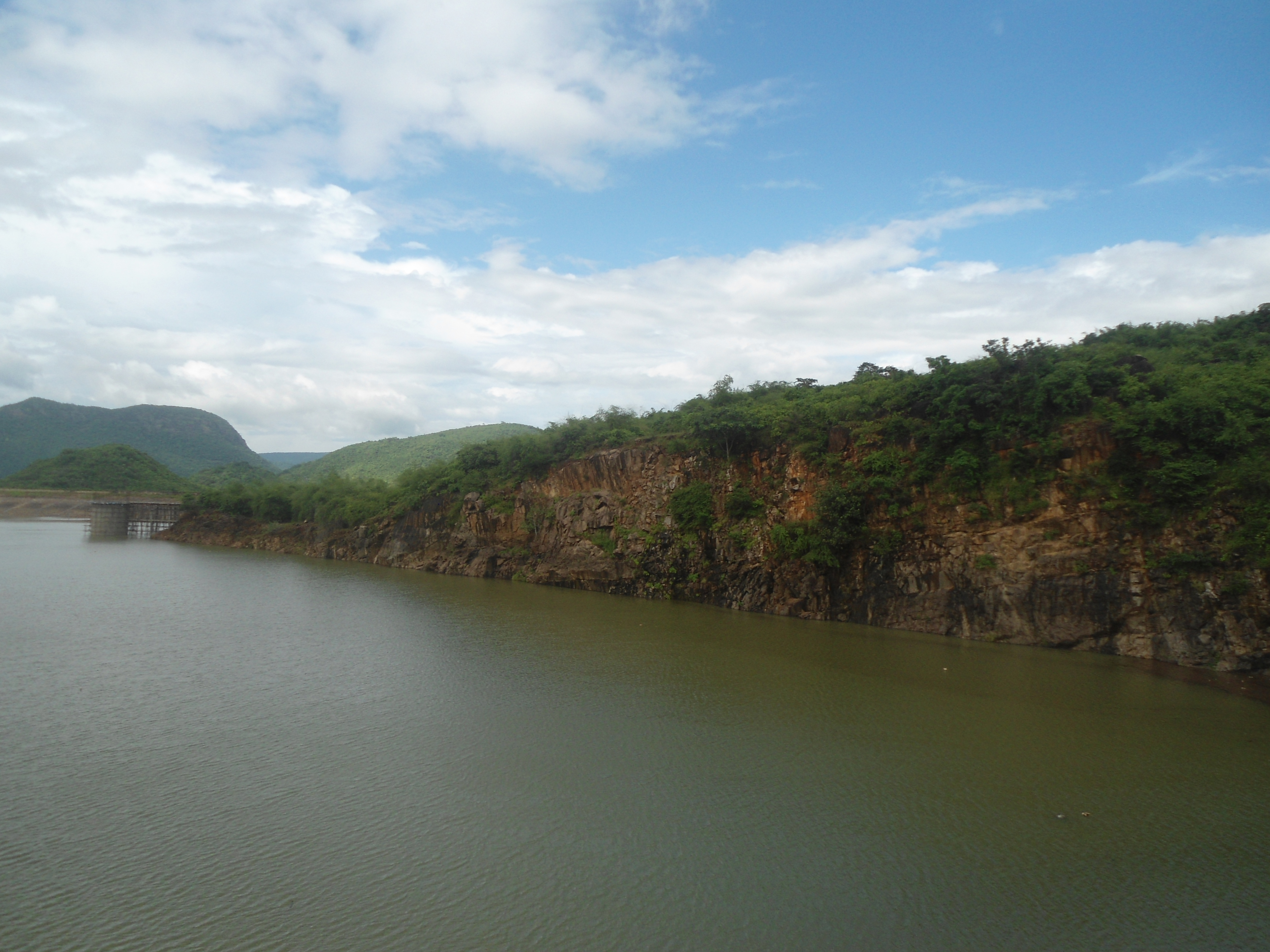
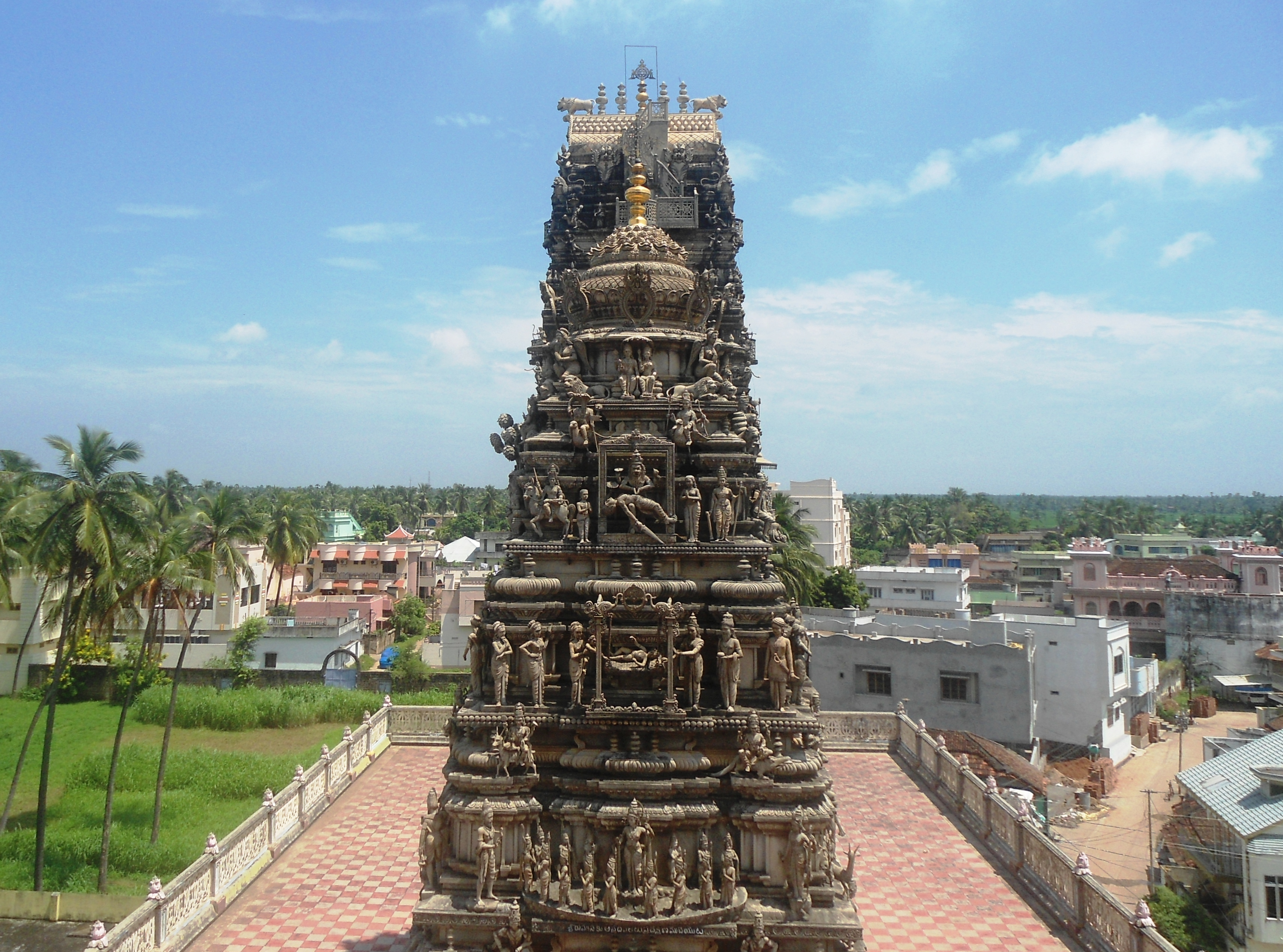
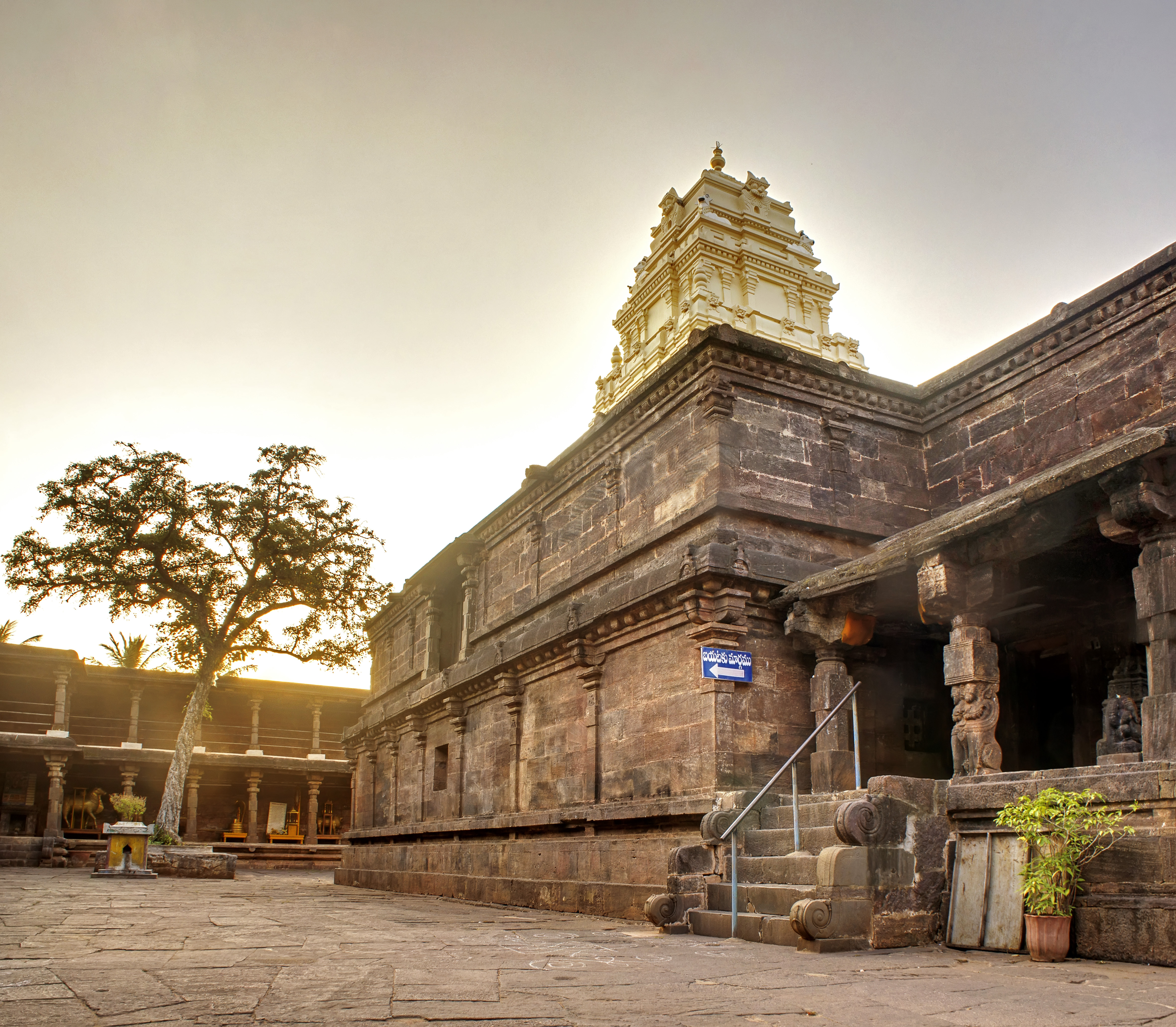
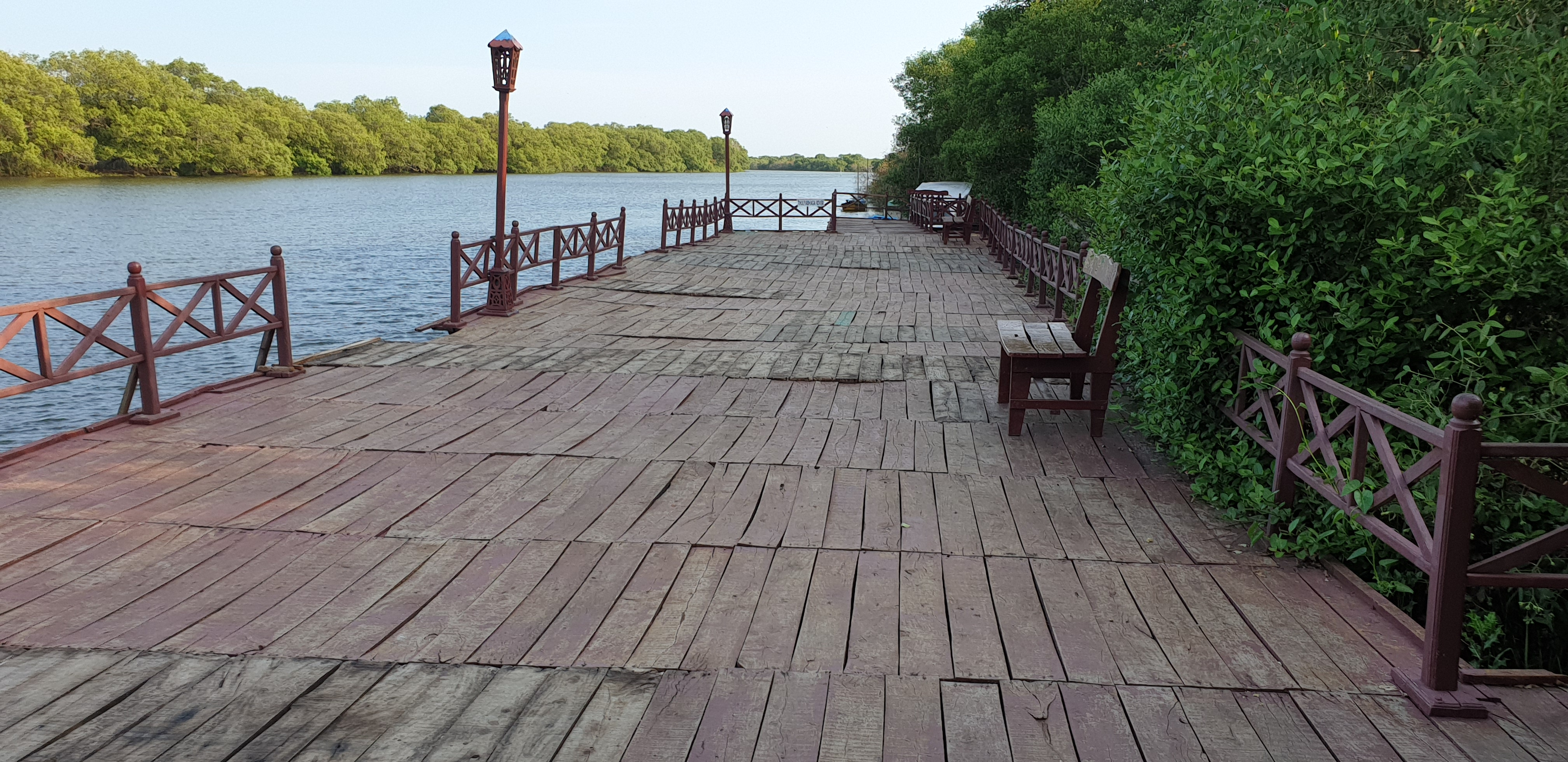
- Interactive map of Kakinada district
- Coordinates: 16.97°N 82.26°E
- Country: India
- State: Andhra Pradesh
- Region: Kosta Andhra
- Headquarters: Kakinada

Area
  - Total: 3,019.79 km^{2} (1,165.95 sq mi)

Population (2011)
  - Total: 2,092,374
  - Density: 692.887/km^{2} (1,794.57/sq mi)
- Time zone: UTC+05:30 (IST)
- District LGD code: 746
- District abbreviation: KKN
- Website: kakinada.ap.gov.in

Kakinada district is a district in the Coastal Andhra Region in the Indian state of Andhra Pradesh. With Kakinada as its administrative headquarters, it was proposed on 26 January 2022 to become one of the resultant twenty six districts in the state after the final notification has been issued on 4 April 2022 by the government of Andhra Pradesh. The district was formed from Kakinada and Peddapuram revenue divisions from East Godavari district. Incidentally, during earlier times, the region comprising towns Pithapuram, Kakinada and Peddapuram were referred as Prolunadu (prōlunāḍu) or Polnaud, which now roughly corresponds to the areas in this district.

== Etymology ==
This district name derives from its headquarters Kakinada.

== History ==
The region's administrative structure has undergone several reorganizations since the early 19th century. In 1823, during British rule, the Rajahmundry District was established as part of the Madras Presidency. In 1859, the administrative divisions of Rajahmundry, Masulipatam, and Guntur were reorganized into two districts: Godavari, with its headquarters at Kakinada, and Kistna, with boundaries defined by the Upputeru and Tamaleru rivers.

Further adjustments occurred in 1907–1908, when portions of the Godavari district were transferred to the Kistna district. In 1925, the Godavari district was bifurcated into East Godavari and West Godavari districts. Kakinada was designated as the headquarters of East Godavari, while Eluru became the administrative center of West Godavari.

On 4 April 2022, East Godavari was further bifurcated, leading to the creation of Kakinada district. Kakinada continued as the administrative headquarters of the newly formed district.

== Geography ==
This district is surrounded in the north by Alluri Sitharama Raju district, south by Bay of Bengal and Yanam district, east by Anakapalli district and west by East Godavari district and Konaseema district.

== Politics ==
There is 1 parliamentary and 7 assembly constituencies in Kakinada district. The parliamentary constituencies are

- Kakinada Lok Sabha constituency

The assembly constituencies are

Constituency number	Name	Reserved for (SC/ST/None)	Parliament
35	Tuni	None	Kakinada
36	Prathipadu	None	Kakinada
37	Pithapuram	None	Kakinada
38	Kakinada Rural	None	Kakinada
39	Peddapuram	None	Kakinada
41	Kakinada City	None	Kakinada
42	Jaggampeta	None	Kakinada

== Administrative divisions ==
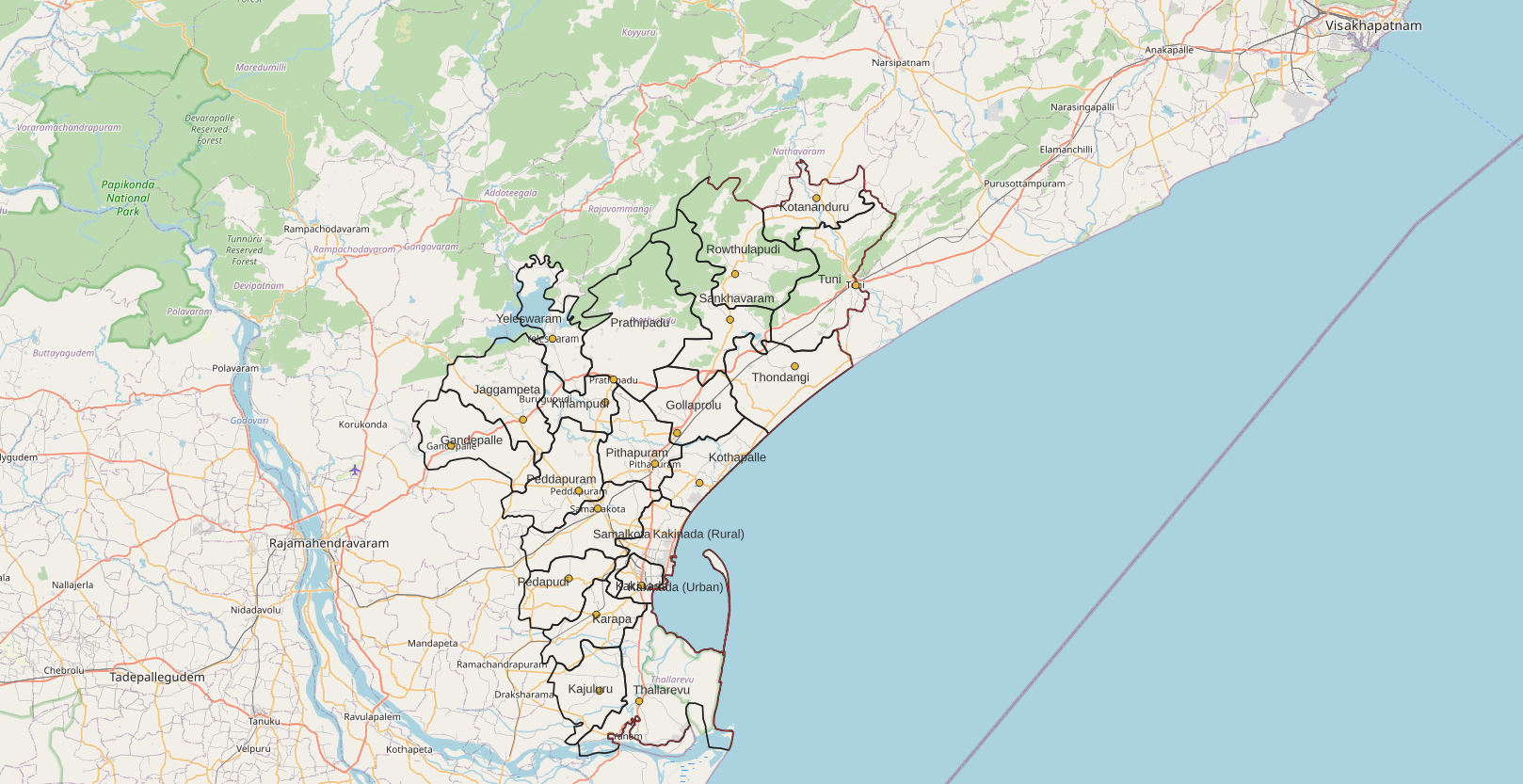
Satellite view of Kakinada district

The district is divided into 2 revenue divisions: Kakinada and Peddapuram, which are further subdivided into a total of 21 mandals, each headed by a sub-collector.

=== Mandals ===
The list of 21 mandals in Kakinada district, divided into 2 revenue divisions, is given below.

1. Kakinada revenue division
  1. Gollaprolu
  2. Kajuluru
  3. Kakinada Rural
  4. Kakinada Urban
  5. Karapa
  6. Pedapudi
  7. Pithapuram
  8. Thallarevu
  9. Thondangi
  10. U. Kothapalli
2. Peddapuram revenue division
  1. Gandepalle
  2. Jaggampeta
  3. Kirlampudi
  4. Kotananduru
  5. Peddapuram
  6. Prathipadu
  7. Rowthulapudi
  8. Samalkota
  9. Sankhavaram
  10. Tuni
  11. Yeleswaram

== Cities and towns ==
Municipal bodies in district
S.No.	City / Town	Municipality formation year	No. of Wards	Civic status of municipal body	2011 census population	2001 census population	1991 census population	1981 census population	1971 census population	1961 census population	1951 census population
1	Kakinada	1866	50	Municipal Corporation	4,43,028	3,76,861	3,27,541	2,40,973	1,64,200	1,22,865	99,952
2	Samalakota	1955	29	Municipality Grade - 2	56,864	53,602	48,760	41,264	34,607	31,924	28,180
3	Pithapuram	1955	28	Municipality Selection Grade	54,859	50,103	44,061	36,607	31,391	27,910	22,040
4	Tuni	1950	30	Municipality Grade - 2	253,425	250,368	147,654	127,876	98,987	67,666	53,443
5	Peddapuram	1955	29	Municipality Special Grade	49,477	45,520	42,806	34,319	28,579	24,302	23,360
6	Yeleswaram	2011	20	Nagar Panchayat	32,957	--	--	--	--	--	--
7	Gollaprolu	2011	23	Municipality Grade- 3	33,882	--	--	--	--	--	--

Erstwhile talukas in district (non-municipal bodies)
S.No.	Town	Civic Status of Town	2011 Census Population
1	Prathipadu	Gram panchayat	20,450

Census towns in district
S.No.	Town	Civic status of town	2011 census population
1	Arempudi [Sankhavaram]	Census town	5,073

== Demographics ==
Religions in Kakinada district (2011)
Religion	Percent
Hinduism	96.78%
Islam	1.47%
Christianity	1.40%
Other or not stated	0.35%
Distribution of religions

At the time of the 2011 census, Kakinada district had a population of 20,92,374, of which 662,726 (31.67%) lived in urban areas. The district had a sex ratio of 1007 females per 1000 males. Scheduled Castes and Scheduled Tribes make up 3,31,103 (15.82%) and 30,803 (1.47%) of the population respectively.

Languages of Kakinada district (2011)
1. Telugu (98.4%)
2. Urdu (1.14%)
3. Others (0.45%)

At the time of the 2011 census, 98.41% of the population spoke Telugu and 1.14% Urdu as their first language.
