= 1951–52 Indian general election in Madras State =

Indian general election in Madras, 1951
- November 1951

75 (of 489) seats in the Lok Sabha
- Registered: 26,980,961
- Turnout: 15,198,376 (56.33%)
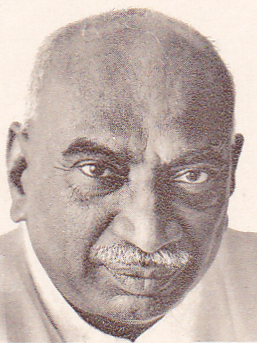

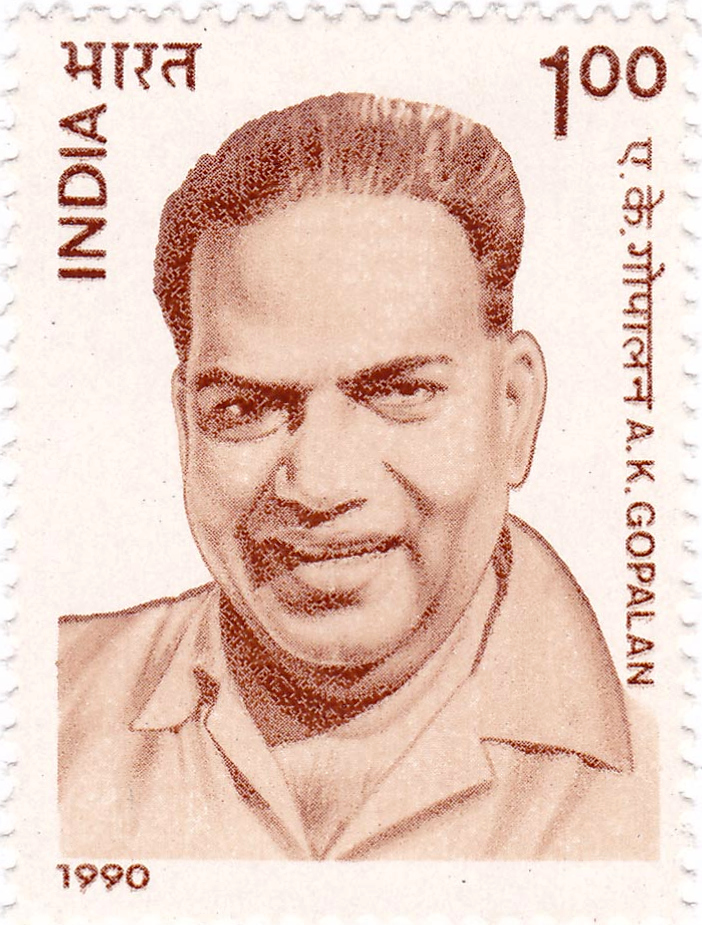
	First party	Second party
Leader	K. Kamaraj	A. K. Gopalan
Party	INC	CPI
Leader's seat	Srivilliputhur	Cannanore
Seats won	35	8
Popular vote	7,253,452	1,783,407
Percentage	36.39%	8.95%
- Madras state
Prime Minister before election
Jawaharlal Nehru
INC
Prime Minister after election
Jawaharlal Nehru
INC

The 1951–52 Indian general election was the first democratic national election held in India after Independence, and the polls in Madras state were held for 62 constituencies with 75 seats. This State had the second largest number of seats, after Uttar Pradesh. The result was a victory for Indian National Congress winning 35 out of the 75 seats. While the remaining seats were won by left and independent parties, opposed to Congress. However, Congress stalwarts such as N. G. Ranga, Durgabai Deshmukh, and Mosalikanti Thirumala Rao lost in that election from the Telugu-speaking areas then referred as Andhra. Congress lost in 22 out of the 28 seats (from 23 constituencies) in majority Telugu-speaking areas (i.e. Andhra region). Reason for the poor performance in Andhra region was attributed to the party's delay in the formation of a separate State for Telugu people. It eventually led to the formation of the Andhra State in 1953 and later the linguistic reorganization of Indian states in 1956 where Kannada and Malayalam majority speaking areas were merged with Mysore and Kerala States respectively.

== Voting and results ==
=== Results by Alliance ===
INC	SEATS	CPI	SEATS	OTHERS	SEATS
INC	35	CPI	8	IND	15
				KMPP	5
				Others	12
TOTAL (1951)	35	TOTAL (1951)	8	TOTAL (1951)	32

- Independent parties are local state parties, that are unrecognised nationally

=== Results by Parties ===
Party	Votes	%	Seats
Indian National Congress	7,253,452	36.39	35
Communist Party of India	1,783,407	8.95	8
Kisan Mazdoor Praja Party	1,952,197	9.79	6
Tamil Nadu Toilers' Party	889,292	4.46	4
Commonweal Party	325,398	1.63	3
Socialist Party	1,055,423	5.29	2
Forward Bloc (Marxist Group)	332,196	1.67	1
Indian Union Muslim League	79,470	0.40	1
Independents	4,614,210	23.15	15
Others (7parties)	1,649,116	8.27	0
Total	19,934,161	100.00	75
Valid votes	15,063,841	99.11	
Invalid/blank votes	134,535	0.89	
Total votes	15,198,376	100.00	
Registered voters/turnout	26,980,961	56.33	

=== Results by Tamil-majority constituencies ===
These were 31 constituencies with 38 seats, namely Madras, Thiruvallur (2 seats), Chengalpattu, Kancheepuram, Vellore (2 seats), Vandavasi, Krishnagiri, Dharmapuri, Salem, Erode (2 seats), Tiruchengode, Tiruppur, Pollachi, Coimbatore, Pudukkottai, Perambalur, Tiruchirappalli, Thanjavur, Kumbakonam, Mayuram (2 seats), Cuddalore (2 seats), Tindivanam (2 seats), Tirunelveli, Srivaikuntam, Sankaranainarkoil, Aruppukottai, Ramanathapuram, Srivilliputhur, Madurai (2 seats), Periyakulam and Dindigul. Madras constituency had significant Telugu population.

Party	Votes	%	Seats
Indian National Congress	4,119,799	41.97	26
Tamil Nadu Toilers' Party	872,418	8.89	4
Commonweal Party	302,889	3.09	2
Kisan Mazdoor Praja Party	455,499	4.64	1
Communist Party of India	487,555	4.97	1
Forward Block (Marxist Group)	235,938	2.40	1
Independents	2,448,591	24.95	3
Others	892,360	9.09	0
Total	9,815,049	100.00	38
Valid votes	7,208,237	99.11	
Invalid/blank votes	64,377	0.89	
Total votes	7,272,614	100.00	
Registered voters/turnout	13,726,706	52.98	

=== Results by Telugu-majority constituencies ===
These were 23 constituencies with 28 seats, namely Pathapatnam, Srikakulam, Vizianagaram, Visakhapatnam (2 seats), Kakinada, Rajahmundry (2 seats), Eluru (2 seats), Masulipatnam, Gudivada, Vijayawada, Tenali, Guntur, Narasaraopet, Ongole (2 seats), Nellore, Nandyal, Kurnool, Anantapur, Cuddapah, Chittoor (2 seats) and Tirupati.

Congress stalwarts such as N. G. Ranga, Durgabai Deshmukh, and Mosalikanti Thirumala Rao lost in that election. Reason for the poor performance of Congress in Telugu-speaking areas both in general then referred as Andhra was attributed to their delay in the formation of a separate state for Telugu people. It eventually led to the formation of the Andhra state in 1953 and later the linguistic reorganization of Indian States in 1956.

Party	Votes	%	Seats
Indian National Congress	2,299,670	29.58	7
Communist Party of India	1,067,618	13.73	6
Kisan Mazdoor Praja Party	882,126	11.35	2
Socialist Party	430,208	5.53	2
Independents	1,870,766	24.06	11
Others	1,224,459	15.75	0
Total	7,774,847	100.00	28
Valid votes	6,068,222	99.11	
Invalid/blank votes	54,196	0.89	
Total votes	6,122,418	100.00	
Registered voters/turnout	10,058,378	60.87	

=== Results by Kannada-majority constituencies ===
These were 3 constituencies with 3 seats, namely Bellary, South Kanara (North) and South Kanara South. However, Bellary constituency had significant Telugu minority population.

Party	Votes	%	Seats
Indian National Congress	319,717	49.46	3
Kisan Mazdoor Praja Party	174,046	26.92	0
Socialist Party	36,371	5.63	0
Independents	116,319	17.99	0
Total	646,453	100.00	3
Valid votes	646,453	99.11	
Invalid/blank votes	5,774	0.89	
Total votes	652,227	100.00	
Registered voters/turnout	1,043,246	62.52	

=== Results by Malayalam-majority constituencies ===
These were 5 constituencies with 6 seats, namely Cannanore, Tellicherry, Kozhikode, Malappuram and Ponnani (2 seats).

Party	Votes	%	Seats
Kisan Mazdoor Praja Party	440,526	25.95	3
Indian National Congress	537,775	31.67	1
Communist Party of India	228,234	13.44	1
Muslim League	79,470	4.68	1
Independents	182,652	10.76	0
Others	229,155	13.50	0
Total	1,697,812	100.00	6
Valid votes	1,310,669	99.23	
Invalid/blank votes	10,188	0.77	
Total votes	1,320,857	100.00	
Registered voters/turnout	2,152,621	61.36	

== List of Elected MPs ==
Telugu speaking areas had 28 seats from 23 constituencies (constituency serial numbers 1 to 24 except 19), Tamil speaking areas had 38 seats from 31 constituencies (constituency serial numbers 25 to 55), Kannada speaking areas had 3 seats from 3 (constituency serial numbers 19, 56 and 57) and Malayalam speaking areas had 6 seats from 5 constituencies (constituency numbers 58 to 62). Kannada-majority Bellary and Tamil-majority Madras has significant Telugu populations.

Constituency		NoS	Winner				Runner-up				Margin	
Constituency		NoS	Candidate	Party	Votes	%	Candidate	Party	Votes	%	Votes	%
1	Pathapatnam	1	V. V. Giri	INC	50,084	29.87	Madusudana Jagadev Raja Bahadur	IND	43,689	26.06	6,395	3.81
2	Srikakulam	1	Boddapalli Rajagopala Rao	IND	51,992	28.00	Pasupati Lakshmi Narsinha Raju	INC	42,593	22.94	9,399	5.06
3	Parvathipuram	1	N. Rama Seshiah	IND	67,124	33.87	Senapathi Sitharama Patrudu	IND	55,279	27.90	11,845	5.97
4	Vizianagaram	1	Kandala Subramaniam	SP	1,12,096	61.64	Pasumarihi Veerabhadraswami	INC	27,541	15.14	84,555	46.50
5	Visakhapatnam	2	Lanka Sundaram	IND	1,40,718	41.45	K. Subbaraju	INC	1,24,102	36.56	N/A	
6	Kakinada	1	Chelikani Venkata Rama Rao	CPI	85,901	39.08	Moslakanti Tirumal Rao	INC	59,540	27.08	26,361	12.00
7	Rajahmundry	2	Kaneti Mohana Rao	CPI	1,47,706	16.41	Nalla Reddi Naidu	SP	1,46,331	16.26	N/A	
8	Eluru	2	K. Subha Rao	CPI	1,87,822	18.77	B. S. Murthy	KMPP	1,64,671	16.46	N/A	
9	Masulipatnam	1	Sanka Butehikottaiah	CPI	1,24,101	48.91	K. Venkata Ramayya	INC	77,250	30.45	46,851	18.46
10	Gudivada	1	K. Gopala Rao	CPI	1,42,537	51.51	Duggirala Balaramakrishniah	INC	86,785	31.36	55,752	20.15
11	Vijayawada	1	Harindranath Chattopadhyaya	IND	1,24,320	46.97	Rajyam Sinha	INC	49,396	18.66	74,924	28.31
12	Tenali	1	Kotha Raghuramaiah	INC	1,03,126	39.70	Koratala Satyanarayana	CPI	1,01,738	39.16	1,388	0.54
13	Guntur	1	S. V. Laxmi Narasimham	IND	79,350	31.18	N. G. Ranga	KLP	61,833	24.30	17,517	6.88
14	Narasaraopet	1	Chapalamadugu Ramiah Chowdry	IND	78,332	36.19	Nandala Anjaneyulu Reddi	INC	48,396	22.36	29,936	13.83
15	Ongole	2	M. Nanadass	IND	1,52,472	21.06	P. Venkataraghaviah	IND	1,26,292	17.45	N/A	
16	Nellore	1	Bezwada Ramachandra Reddy	IND	67,582	32.65	Vennalakurthi Raghavaiah	INC	65,795	31.78	1,787	0.87
17	Nandyal	1	Seshagiri Rao	IND	67,905	27.74	Sura Rami Reddy	INC	61,301	25.04	6,604	2.70
18	Kurnool	1	H. Sitharama Reddy	INC	70,887	36.50	Y. Gadilingana Goud	IND	57,874	29.80	13,013	6.70
19	Bellary	1	T. Subrahmanyam	INC	1,24,976	56.91	Y. Mahabaleshwarappa	IND	94,615	43.09	30,361	13.82
20	Anantapur	1	Paidi Lakshmayya	INC	85,187	39.45	Pamidi Bayapa Reddi	IND	76,187	35.28	9,000	4.17
21	Penukonda	1	K. S. Raghavachari	KMPP	1,09,408	50.27	Kalluri Subba Rao	INC	85,098	39.10	24,310	11.17
22	Cuddapah	1	Eswara Reddi Yeddula	CPI	85,125	35.47	P. Basi Reddy	INC	66,658	27.78	18,467	7.69
23	Chittoor	2	T. N. Vishwanatha Reddi	INC	1,61,590	20.49	M. V. Gangadara Siva	INC	1,51,082	19.16	N/A	
24	Tirupati	1	M. Ananthasayanam Ayyangar	INC	1,14,782	51.35	N. Venkataram Naidu	KLP	1,08,745	48.65	6,037	2.70
25	Madras	1	T. T. Krishnamachari	INC	79,431	40.66	Balasubramanya	JUSP	63,254	32.38	16,177	8.28
26	Tiruvallur	2	Margatham Chandrasekar	INC	1,10,265	17.89	P. Natesan	INC	90,340	14.66	N/A	
27	Chingleput	1	O. V. Alagesan	INC	55,102	36.53	A. R. L. Pathy	KMPP	39,857	26.42	15,245	10.11
28	Kancheepuram	1	A. Krishnaswami	CWL	1,11,233	55.63	T. Chengalvarayan	INC	88,724	44.37	22,509	11.26
29	Vellore	2	Muthukrishnan	INC	1,39,448	20.89	Ramachander	CWL	1,18,154	17.70	N/A	
30	Wandiwash	1	Munisami	CWL	96,011	54.09	Ramachandra Reddy	INC	68,498	38.59	27,513	15.50
31	Krishnagiri	1	C. R. Narasimhan	INC	61,672	41.88	C. Doraisami Gounder	IND	55,478	37.68	6,194	4.20
32	Dharmapuri	1	N. Satyanathan	IND	66,216	35.69	K. Subramanian	INC	61,570	33.18	4,646	2.51
33	Salem	1	S. V. Ramaswami	INC	90,570	44.44	Konnu Rao Sahaib S. Durai Konnu Pillai	IND	79,705	39.11	10,865	5.33
34	Erode	2	Balakrishnan	INC	1,69,708	21.68	Periasami Gounder	INC	1,54,527	19.74	N/A	
35	Tiruchengode	1	S. K. Baby alias Kandaswami	IND	95,664	54.78	Dr. P. Subbarayan	INC	78,973	45.22	16,691	9.56
36	Tiruppur	1	T. S. Avinashilingam Chettiar	INC	1,17,630	56.45	Venkatachalam	IND	90,745	43.55	26,885	12.90
37	Pollachi	1	Damodaram	INC	93,405	44.40	Krisnabai Nimbkar Vasudev	SP	46,744	22.22	46,661	22.18
38	Coimbatore	1	T. A. Ramalinga Chettiar	INC	Won Uncontested							
39	Pudukkottai	1	K. M. Vallatharsu	KMPP	1,02,404	53.42	V. Ramaiah Servai	INC	89,293	46.58	13,111	6.84
40	Perambalur	1	V. Boorarangaswami Pandayachi	TNT	84,332	37.34	R. Krishnaswami Reddiar	INC	65,443	28.98	18,889	8.36
41	Tiruchirappalli	1	E. Mathuram	IND	94,184	43.82	N. Halasyam	INC	77,007	35.83	17,177	7.99
42	Tanjore	1	R. Venkataraman	INC	92,483	45.85	R. Srinivasa Sarma	IND	87,476	43.36	5,007	2.49
43	Kumbakonam	1	C. Ramaswamy Mudaliar	INC	95,433	41.59	Ramaiah	IND	62,124	27.07	33,309	14.52
44	Mayuram	2	K. Ananda Nambiar	CPI	1,98,743	22.49	K. Santhanam	INC	1,89,089	21.40	N/A	
45	Cuddalore	2	Govindaswamy Kachirayar	TNT	1,86,894	25.26	Kanakasabai	INC	1,64,985	22.30	N/A	
46	Tindivanam	2	A. Jayaraman	TNT	2,20,670	27.95	V. Muniswami	TNT	2,14,772	27.20	N/A	
47	Tirunelveli	1	Thanu Pillai	INC	86,077	44.32	Athimoolam	IND	71,871	37.01	14,206	7.31
48	Srivaikuntam	1	A. V. Thomas	INC	1,07,338	62.31	M. M. Subramanian	SP	64,916	37.69	42,422	24.62
49	Sankaranainarkoil	1	M. Sankarapandian	INC	96,577	39.11	Ahmad Ibrahim	IND	92,459	37.44	4,118	1.67
50	Aruppukottai	1	U. Muthuramalinga Thevar	MFB	90,512	45.09	M. Gulam Mohideen	INC	70,724	35.23	19,788	9.86
51	Ramanathapuram	1	V. Vr. N. Ar. Nagappa Chettiar	INC	1,09,110	56.36	T. Sundaram	KMPP	44,118	22.79	64,992	33.57
52	Srivilliputtur	1	K. Kamaraj Nadar	INC	1,04,829	46.77	G. D. Naidu	IND	77,835	34.73	26,994	12.04
53	Madurai	2	S. Balasubramaniam	INC	1,95,762	26.68	P. M. Kakkan	INC	1,89,945	25.89	N/A	
54	Periyakulam	1	A. Sakthivadivel Gounder	INC	1,07,875	44.43	C. Raghupathi Thevar	MFB	74,991	30.89	32,884	13.54
55	Dindigul	1	Ammu Swaminathan	INC	77,285	36.89	Krishnaswami	CPI	64,953	31.01	12,332	5.88
56	South Kanara (North)	1	U. Srinivas Mallya	INC	98,122	44.45	K. B. Jinaraja Hegde	KMPP	86,268	39.08	11,854	5.37
57	South Kanara South	1	B. Shiva Rao	INC	96,619	46.88	K. R. Karanth	KMPP	87,778	42.59	8,841	4.29
58	Cannanore	1	A. K. Gopalan	CPI	1,66,299	65.87	C. K. K. Govindan Nayar	INC	79,270	31.40	87,029	34.47
59	Tellicherry	1	N. Damodaran	KMPP	98,483	42.61	P. Kunhiraman	INC	62,182	26.90	36,301	15.71
60	Kozhikode	1	Achuthan Damodaran Menon	KMPP	1,04,466	44.26	Ummar Koya, Parappil	INC	77,012	32.63	27,454	11.63
61	Malappuram	1	B. Pocker	ML	79,470	38.98	T. V. Chathukutty Nair	INC	62,494	30.65	16,976	8.33
62	Ponnani	2	Kelappan Koyhapali	KMPP	1,46,366	18.90	Karunakara Menon	INC	1,36,603	17.64	N/A	

== See also ==
- Elections in Tamil Nadu

== Bibliography ==
- Volume I, 1951 Indian general election, 1st Lok Sabha
