= Thota Gopala Krishna =

Indian politician

Member of Legislative Assembly Andhra Pradesh
- In office 2004–2009
- Preceded by: Boddu Bhaskara Ramarao
- Succeeded by: Pantam Gandhi Mohan
- Constituency: Peddapuram

Member of Parliament, Lok Sabha
- In office 1996-1998
- Preceded by: Thota Subba Rao
- Succeeded by: Venkata Krishnam Raju Uppalapati
- Constituency: Kakinada
- In office 1984-1989
- Preceded by: M. S. Sanjeevi Rao
- Succeeded by: Mallipudi Mangapathi Pallam Raju
- Constituency: Kakinada

Personal details
- Born: 27 March 1945 Kirlampudi, East Godavari, Madras Presidency, British India(Now in Andhra Pradesh, India)
- Died: 5 January 2012 (aged 66)
- Party: Telugu Desam Party
- Other political affiliations: Indian National Congress, YSR Congress
- Spouse: Atchuta Mani
- Children: One son and one daughter

Thota Gopala Krishna (1945–2012) was an Indian politician who was elected to the Lok Sabha, the lower house of the Parliament of India, from the Kakinada in Andhra Pradesh as a member of the Telugu Desam Party.
