= Kakinada Lok Sabha constituency =

Lok Sabha Constituency in Andhra Pradesh

Coordinates: 16.98°N 82.24°E

Kakinada
- Lok Sabha constituency
- Interactive Map Outlining Kakinada Lok Sabha constituency

Constituency details
- Country: India
- Region: South India
- State: Andhra Pradesh
- Assembly constituencies: Tuni; Prathipadu; Pithapuram; Kakinada Rural; Peddapuram; Kakinada City; Jaggampeta
- Established: 1952
- Reservation: None

Member of Parliament
- 18th Lok Sabha
- Incumbent Tangella Uday Srinivas
- Party: JSP
- Alliance: NDA
- Elected year: 2024
- Preceded by: Vanga Geetha

Kakinada Lok Sabha constituency is one of the twenty-five lok sabha constituencies of Andhra Pradesh in India. It comprises seven assembly segments and belongs to Kakinada district.

== Assembly segments ==
Kakinada Lok Sabha constituency presently comprises the following Legislative Assembly segments:

#	Name	District	Member	Party	Leading (in 2024)
35	Tuni	Kakinada	Yanamala Divya	TDP	JSP
36	Prathipadu	Kakinada	Varupula Satya Prabha	TDP	JSP
37	Pithapuram	Kakinada	Pawan Kalyan	JSP	JSP
38	Kakinada Rural	Kakinada	Pantham Venkateswara Rao	JSP	JSP
39	Peddapuram	Kakinada	Nimmakayala Chinarajappa	TDP	JSP
41	Kakinada City	Kakinada	Vanamadi Venkateswara Rao	TDP	JSP
52	Jaggampeta	Kakinada	Jyothula Nehru	TDP	JSP

== Members of Parliament ==
Year	Member	Party
1952	Chelikani Venkata Rama Rao	Communist Party of India
1957	Bayya Suryanarayana Murthy	Indian National Congress
1957	Mosaliganti Thirumala Rao	Indian National Congress
1962	Mosaliganti Thirumala Rao	Indian National Congress
1967	Mosaliganti Thirumala Rao	Indian National Congress
1971	M. S. Sanjeevi Rao	Indian National Congress
1977	M. S. Sanjeevi Rao	Indian National Congress
1980	M. S. Sanjeevi Rao	Indian National Congress (I)
1984	Thota Gopala Krishna	Telugu Desam Party
1989	M. M. Pallam Raju	Indian National Congress
1991	Thota Subba Rao	Telugu Desam Party
1996	Thota Gopala Krishna	Telugu Desam Party
1998	Krishnam Raju	Bharatiya Janata Party
1999	Mudragada Padmanabham	Telugu Desam Party
2004	M. M. Pallam Raju	Indian National Congress
2009	M. M. Pallam Raju	Indian National Congress
2014	Thota Narasimham	Telugu Desam Party
2019	Vanga Geetha	YSR Congress Party
2024	Tangella Uday Srinivas	Janasena Party

== Election results ==
=== General Election 1989 ===
General Election, 1989: Kakinada
Party	Candidate	Votes	%	±%
INC	Mallipudi Mangapathi Pallam Raju	383,681	54.45	+16.83
TDP	Thota Gopala Krishna	300,698	42.67	−17.71
Independent	Thota Rakanja Neyulu	11,739	1.67	
BSP	Sundaraiah	8,536	1.21	
Majority		82,983	11.78	
Turnout		704,654	71.96	+1.14
INC gain from TDP		Swing		

=== General Election 1991 ===
General Election, 1991: Kakinada
Party	Candidate	Votes	%	±%
TDP	Thota Subbarao	287,357	48.85	+6.18
INC	Mallipudi Mangapathi Pallam Raju	252,040	42.85	−11.60
BJP	Rao Venkata Maheepati Rama Ratna Rao	20,894	3.55	
Independent	Thota Ramanjaneyulu	7,287	1.24	
BSP	Chokka Tatarao	6,776	1.15	
Majority		35,317	6.00	
Turnout		588,237	59.92	−12.04
TDP gain from INC		Swing		

=== General Election 1996 ===
General Election, 1996: Kakinada
Party	Candidate	Votes	%	±%
TDP	Thota Gopala Krishna	308,480	42.37	−6.48
INC	Thota Subba Rao	269,981	37.09	−5.76
NTRTDP(LP)	Chikkala Ramachandra Rao	122,149	16.78	
BJP	B. S. R. Krishna	12,751	1.75	
Majority		38,499	5.28	
Turnout		727,999	62.50	+2.58
TDP hold		Swing		

=== General Election 1998 ===
General Election, 1998: Kakinada
Party	Candidate	Votes	%	±%
BJP	Krishnam Raju	330,381	41.06	+39.31
TDP	Thota Gopala Krishna	262,582	32.63	−9.74
INC	Mallipudi Mangapathi Pallam Raju	193,178	24.01	−13.08
Majority		67,799	8.43	
Turnout		804,652	69.39	+6.89
BJP gain from TDP		Swing		

=== General Election 1999 ===
General Election, 1999: Kakinada
Party	Candidate	Votes	%	±%
TDP	Mudragada Padmanabham	435,811	53.64	+21.01
INC	Thota Subbarao	314,376	38.69	+6.06
Majority		121,435	14.95	
Turnout		812,541	69.33	−0.06
TDP gain from BJP		Swing	+9.69	

=== General Election 2004 ===
General Election, 2004: Kakinada
Party	Candidate	Votes	%	±%
INC	Mallipudi Mangapathi Pallam Raju	410,982	49.38	+10.69
TDP	Mudragada Padmanabham	353,730	42.50	−11.14
Independent	Chandravathi Dwarampudi	30,153	3.62	
BSP	Apparao Puagala	16,373	1.97	
CPI(ML)L	Nainalasetti Murthy	9,458	1.13	+0.04
Independent	Puvvala Ananda Rao	8,544	1.03	
Independent	Chaganti Suryanarayana Murthy	3,044	0.37	
Majority		57,252	6.88	
Turnout		832,284	71.44	+2.11
INC gain from TDP		Swing		

=== General Election 2009 ===
General Election, 2009: Kakinada
Party	Candidate	Votes	%	±%
INC	Mallipudi Mangapathi Pallam Raju	323,607	33.51	−15.87
PRP	Chalamalasetty Sunil	289,563	29.99	
TDP	Vasamsetty Satya	258,046	26.72	−15.78
BJP	Bikkina Visweswara Rao	14,861	1.17	
Majority		34,044	3.52	
Turnout		965,570	76.32	+4.88
INC hold		Swing		

=== General Election 2014 ===
2014 Indian general elections: Kakinada
Party	Candidate	Votes	%	±%
TDP	Thota Narasimham	514,402	46.76	
YSRCP	Chalamalasetti Sunil	510,971	46.45	
INC	Mallipudi Mangapathi Pallam Raju	19,754	1.80	
RPI (K)	Motha Sarada	6,836	0.62	
IND.	Jalluri Venkateswarlu	6,636	0.60	
JSP	Tummalapalli Satya Ramakrishna	6,442	0.59	
NOTA	None of the Above	4,358	0.40	
Majority		3,431	0.31	
Turnout		11,01,730	77.68	+1.36
TDP gain from INC		Swing	+25.88	

=== General Election 2019 ===
2019 Indian general elections: Kakinada
Party	Candidate	Votes	%	±%
YSRCP	Vanga Geetha Viswanadh	537,630	43.47	▼2.98
TDP	Chalamalasetti Sunil	511,892	41.38	▼5.38
JSP	Jyothula Venkateswara Rao	132,648	10.72	New
NOTA	None of the above	17,153	1.39	
BJP	Yalla Venkata Rama Mohan Rao	9,596	0.78	
INC	Mallipudi Sri Ramachandra Murthy	8,640	0.70	
Majority		25,738	2.09	
Turnout		12,36,814	79.08	
Registered electors		15,63,930		
YSRCP gain from TDP		Swing		

=== General Election 2024 ===
2024 Indian general elections: Kakinada
Party	Candidate	Votes	%	±%
JSP	Uday Srinivas Tangella	729,669	54.87	▲44.15
YSRCP	Chalamalasetty Sunil	5,00,208	37.62	▼5.85
INC	M. M. Pallam Raju	21,109	1.59	▲0.79
NOTA	None of the above	17,220	1.29	▼0.10
Majority		2,29,491	17.25	
Turnout		13,31,386	81.43	▲2.35
JSP gain from YSRCP		Swing		

== See also ==
- List of constituencies of the Andhra Pradesh Legislative Assembly
