= Karapa mandal =

- Mandal
- Interactive map of Karapa mandal
- Country: India
- State: Andhra Pradesh
- District: Kakinada

Area
  - Total: 104.03 km^{2} (40.17 sq mi)
- Time zone: UTC+5:30 (IST)

Karapa mandal is one of the 21 mandals in Kakinada District of Andhra Pradesh. As per census 2011, there are 19 villages.

== Demographics ==
Karapa Mandal has total population of 76,398 as per the Census 2011 out of which 38,460 are males while 37,938 are females and the average Sex Ratio of Karapa Mandal is 986. The total literacy rate of Karapa Mandal is 68.61%. The male literacy rate is 63.59% and the female literacy rate is 58.76%.

== Towns and villages ==
=== Villages ===
pedakotturu vijayarayudupalem uppalanka goddatipalem

1. Aratlakatta
2. China Mamidada
3. G. Bhavaram
4. Gorripudi
5. Gurajanapalle
6. Karapa
7. Kongodu
8. Koripalle
9. Kurada
10. Nadakuduru
11. Patharlagadda
12. Peddapurapadu
13. Penuguduru
14. Siripuram
15. Vakada
16. Valasapakala
17. Velangi
18. Vemulavada
19. Yandamuru
20. Z. Bhavaram

== See also ==
- List of mandals in Andhra Pradesh
