= Jaggampeta Assembly constituency =

Constituency of the Andhra Pradesh Legislative Assembly, India

Coordinates: 17.17°N 82.06°E

Jaggampeta
- Constituency No. 52 for the Andhra Pradesh Legislative Assembly
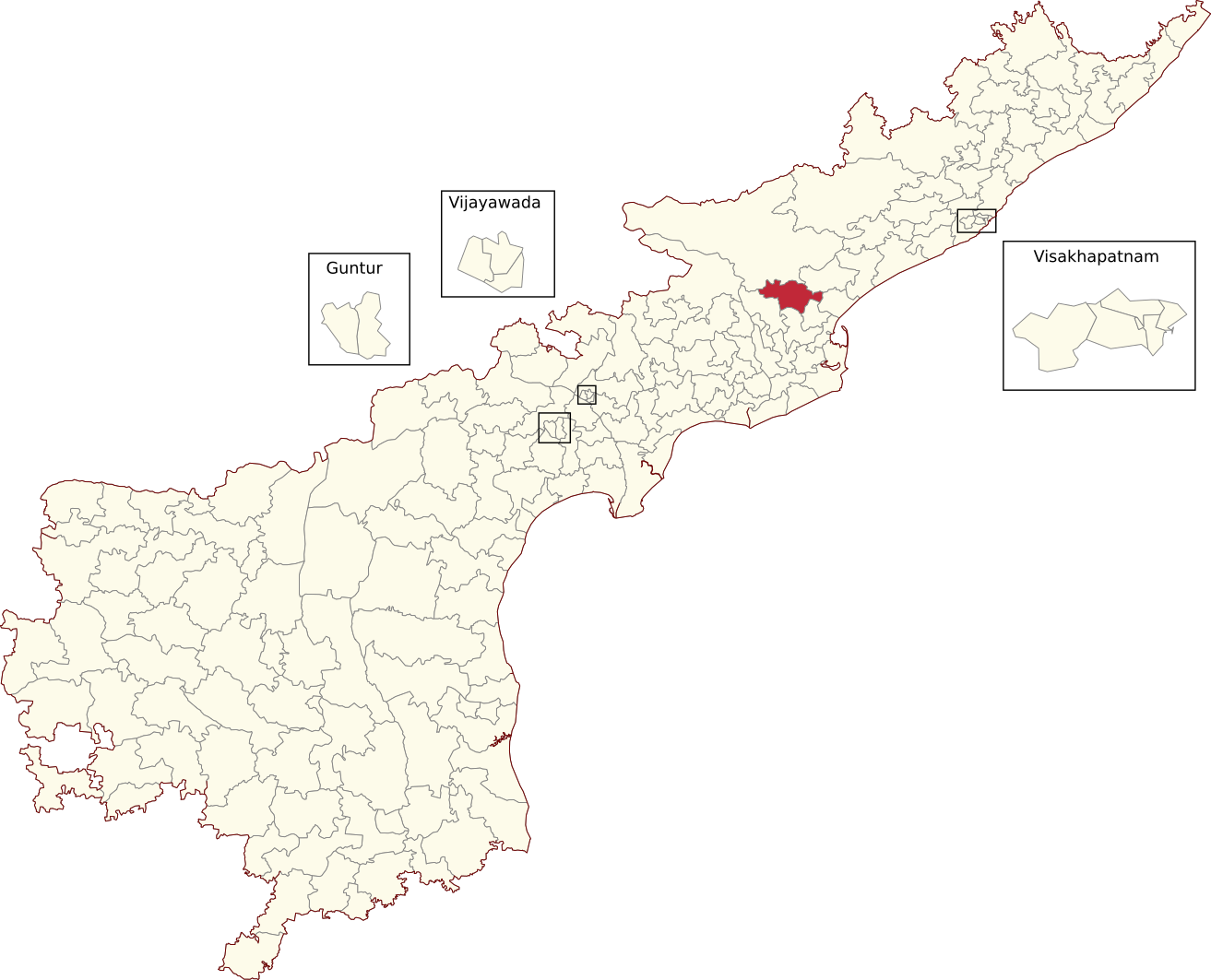
- Location of Jaggampeta Assembly constituency within Andhra Pradesh

Constituency details
- Country: India
- Region: South India
- State: Andhra Pradesh
- District: Kakinada
- Lok Sabha constituency: Kakinada
- Established: 1955
- Total electors: 231,894
- Reservation: None

Member of Legislative Assembly
- 16th Andhra Pradesh Legislative Assembly
- Incumbent Jyothula Nehru
- Party: TDP
- Alliance: NDA
- Elected year: 2024

Jaggampeta Assembly constituency is a constituency in Kakinada district of Andhra Pradesh that elects representatives to the Andhra Pradesh Legislative Assembly in India. It is one of the seven assembly segments of Kakinada Lok Sabha constituency.

Jyothula Nehru is the current MLA of the constituency, having won the 2024 Andhra Pradesh Legislative Assembly election from Telugu Desam Party. As of 2024, there are a total of 231,894 electors in the constituency. The constituency was established in 1955, as per the Delimitation Orders (1955).

== Mandals ==
The four mandals that form the assembly constituency are:

Mandal
Jaggampeta
Gokavaram
Gandepalle
Kirlampudi

== Members of the Legislative Assembly ==
Year	Member	Political party
1955	Duriseti Gopalrao	Independent
1962	Vaddi Mutyala Rao	Indian National Congress
1967	K. Pantam	Independent
1972	Pantham Padmanabham	Indian National Congress
1978	Pantham Padmanabham	Indian National Congress (I)
1983	Thota Subbarao	Telugu Desam Party
1985	Thota Subbarao	Telugu Desam Party
1989	Thota Subbarao	Telugu Desam Party
1991 by-election	Thota Venkata Chalam	Indian National Congress
1994	Jyothula Nehru	Telugu Desam Party
1999	Jyothula Nehru	Telugu Desam Party
2004	Thota Narasimham	Indian National Congress
2009	Thota Narasimham	Indian National Congress
2014	Jyothula Nehru	YSR Congress Party
2019	Jyothula Chantibabu	YSR Congress Party
2024	Jyothula Nehru	Telugu Desam Party

== Election results ==
=== 2024 ===
2024 Andhra Pradesh Legislative Assembly election: Jaggampeta
Party	Candidate	Votes	%	±%
TDP	Jyothula Nehru	1,13,593	58.56	
YSRCP	Thota Narasimham	60,917	31.4%	
Independent	Patamsetti Surya Chandra	12,531	6.4%	
NOTA	None Of The Above	1,928	0.01%	
Majority		52,676	27.15%	
Turnout		1,93,979	83.65%	
TDP gain from YSRCP		Swing		

=== 2019 ===
2019 Andhra Pradesh Legislative Assembly election: Jaggampeta
Party	Candidate	Votes	%	±%
YSRCP	Jyothula Chanti Babu	93,496	51.62%	
TDP	Jyothula Nehru	70,131	38.72%	
JSP	Patamsetti Suryachandra	10,649	5.88%	
Majority		23,365	12.9%	
Turnout		1,81,127	85.86%	
YSRCP hold		Swing		

=== 2014 ===
2014 Andhra Pradesh Legislative Assembly election: Jaggampeta
Party	Candidate	Votes	%	±%
YSRCP	Jyothula Nehru	86,146	55.05	
TDP	Jyothula Chanti Babu	72,214	43.45	
Majority		15,932	9.58	
Turnout		166,213	83.59	+4.77
YSRCP gain from INC		Swing		

=== 2009 ===
2009 Andhra Pradesh Legislative Assembly election: Jaggampeta
Party	Candidate	Votes	%	±%
INC	Thota Narasimham	51,184	34.84	
PRP	Jyothula Nehru	50,395	34.31	
TDP	Jyothula Chanti Babu	33,277	22.65	
Majority		789	0.53	
Turnout		146,893	78.82	−1.27
INC hold		Swing		

=== 1999 ===
1999 Andhra Pradesh Legislative Assembly election: Jaggampeta
Party	Candidate	Votes	%	±%
TDP	Jyothula Nehru	63,626	53.8	▼4.7
INC	Thota Venkata Chalam	53,812	45.5%	▲5.5
Anna Telugu Desam Party	Rapeti Harikrishna	762	0.6%	
Independent	Veerayya Gollepalli	122	0.1%	
Majority		9,814	8.1%	▼10.1
Turnout		120,725	78.7%	▼1.9
TDP hold		Swing		

=== 1994 ===
1994 Andhra Pradesh Legislative Assembly election: Jaggampeta
Party	Candidate	Votes	%	±%
TDP	Jyothula Nehru	64,186	58.5	▲12.7
INC	Thota Venkatachalam (incumbent)	43,885	40%	▼12.61
BJP	Vundavilli Manikyam	991	0.9%	▼0.19
Independent	Asharatnam Synam	534	0.5%	
Independent	Padala Murty	129	0.1%	
Independent	Srimanthula Veerraju	64	0.1%	
Majority		20,301	18.2%	▲11.39
Turnout		111,524	80.6%	
TDP gain from INC		Swing		

=== 1991 ===
1991 Jaggampeta By-Election
Party	Candidate	Votes	%	±%
INC	Thota Venkata Chalam	51,150	52.61	▲2.41
TDP	J.V.Apparao	44,530	45.80%	▼4.40
BJP	S.Bapiraju	1,063	1.09%	
Independent	P.T. Rao	322	0.33%	
Independent	K.V.P. Rao	159	0.16%	
Majority		6,620	6.81%	▲3.31
Turnout			%	
INC gain from TDP		Swing		

=== 1989 ===
1989 Andhra Pradesh Legislative Assembly election: Jaggampeta
Party	Candidate	Votes	%	±%
TDP	Thota Subbarao	49,504	50.2	▼20.6
INC	Thota Venkatachalam	45,969	46.7	▲19.3
CPI(M-L)	Asharatnam Synam	1,671	1.7%	
Independent	Gandi Yosepu	799	0.8%	
Independent	Gangadhara Jandhyala	384	0.4%	
Independent	Vundavilli Rao	206	0.2%	
Majority		3,535	3.5%	▼39.3
Turnout		102,205	77.7%	▲10.2
TDP hold		Swing		

=== 1985 ===
1985 Andhra Pradesh Legislative Assembly election: Jaggampeta
Party	Candidate	Votes	%	±%
TDP	Thota Subbarao	52,756	70.8	▲8.6
INC	Panthan Babu	24,408	27.4%	▼9.7
Independent	Kate Ramulu	822	1.1%	
Independent	Asirayya Seerapu	491	0.7%	
Majority		32,348	42.8%	▲18.1
Turnout		75,554	67.5%	▼7.5
TDP hold		Swing		

=== 1983 ===
1983 Andhra Pradesh Legislative Assembly election: Jaggampeta
Party	Candidate	Votes	%	±%
TDP	Thota Subbarao	47,085	62.2	
INC	Pantham Padmnabham	28,094	37.1	▼15.1
Independent	Bodmpudi Sathiyya	514	0.7	
Majority		18,991	24.7	▲12.3
Turnout		76,964	75	−▼4.2
TDP gain from INC(I)		Swing		

=== 1978 ===
1978 Andhra Pradesh Legislative Assembly election: Jaggampeta
Party	Candidate	Votes	%	±%
INC(I)	Pantham Padmnabham	40,566	52.2	▲3.38
JP	Vaddi Mutyalarao	30,683	39.5	
INC	Suryanarayanamurty Venkata	6,515	8.4	
Majority		9,883	12.4	▲
Turnout		79,415	79.2	▲9.48
INC(I) gain from INC		Swing		

=== 1972 ===
1972 Andhra Pradesh Legislative Assembly election: Jaggampeta
Party	Candidate	Votes	%	±%
INC	Pantham Padmanabham	28,528	48.82	▲8.15
Independent	Mutyalarao Vaddi	26,422	45.21	
Independent	Bedampudi Pedasatteyya	3,488	5.97	
Majority		2,106	3.61	▼8.58
Turnout		58,438	69.72	▼6.13
INC gain from Independent		Swing		

=== 1967 ===
1967 Andhra Pradesh Legislative Assembly election: Jaggampeta
Party	Candidate	Votes	%	±%
Independent	K. Pantam	28,771	52.86	
INC	V. Rao	22,138	40.67	
Independent	K .N. Rao	3,519	6.47	
Majority		6,633	12.19	
Turnout		54,428	75.85	
Independent gain from INC		Swing		

=== 1962 ===
1962 Andhra Pradesh Legislative Assembly election: Jaggampeta
Party	Candidate	Votes	%	±%
INC	Vaddi Mutyala Rao	19,330		
Independent	Duriseti Gopal Rao	15,970		
Majority		3,360		
Turnout		35,300		
INC gain from Independent		Swing		

=== 1955 ===
1955 Andhra State Legislative Assembly election: Jaggampeta
Party	Candidate	Votes	%	±%
Independent	Duriseti Gopalrao	16,431	44.54	
KLP	Vaddi Rao	11,518	31.22	
CPI	Donepudi Rao	8,944	24.24	
Majority		4,913	13.32	
Turnout		36,893	64.76	−1.27
Independent win (new seat)				

== See also ==
- List of constituencies of the Andhra Pradesh Legislative Assembly
