= Vemulawada =

Vemulawada may refer to any one of the following places in India:

- Vemulawada, Rajanna Sircilla district, a temple town in Rajanna Sircilla district of Telangana, India
  - Chalukyas of Vemulavada, medieval Indian dynasty based in the town
  - Raja Rajeswara Temple, Vemulawada
- Vemulawada, East Godavari district, a temple town in East Godavari district of Andhra Pradesh, India
- Vemulawada Bheemakavi, 11th-century Indian poet in Telugu
  - Vemulawada Bheemakavi (film), 1976 Indian film about him
