= Varupula Subbarao =

Indian politician

Varupula Subbarao (born 1944) is an Indian politician from Andhra Pradesh. He was a former two-time member of the Andhra Pradesh Legislative Assembly from Prathipadu Assembly constituency in the erstwhile East Godavari district representing the YSR Congress Party.

== Early life ==
Subbarao is from Prathipadu, in the former East Godavari district presently in Kakinada district, Andhra Pradesh. He is a farmer. He studied till Class 10. He declared assets worth Rs.1 crore in his affidavit to the Election Commission of India.

== Career ==
After losing to Bapanamma in the 1999 election, Subbarao was first elected from Parvathipuram Assembly constituency in the 2004 Andhra Pradesh Legislative Assembly election representing the Indian National Congress. He polled 70,962 votes and defeated his nearest rival, Parvatha Bapanamma of the Telugu Desam Party, by a margin of 18,368 votes. He lost the 2009 Andhra Pradesh Legislative Assembly election to Parvatha Srisatyanarayana Murthy of the Telugu Desam Party, by a margin of 3,286 votes. He later shifted to the YSR Congress Party and regained the Prathipadu seat in the 2014 Andhra Pradesh Legislative Assembly election representing the YSR Congress Party. He polled 63,693 votes, and defeated his closest opponent, P. S. Satyanarayana Murthy of the Telugu Desam Party, by a margin of 3,413 votes. In 2019, he breifly joined the Telugu Desam Party but returned to YSR Congress Party.

After missing the 2019 election, he contested the 2024 Andhra Pradesh Legislative Assembly election on YSR Congress Party ticket but lost again. In 2024, he polled 64,234 votes and lost to Varupula Sathyaprabha of the Telugu Desam Party, by a margin of 38,768 votes. In 2026, he joined Jana Sena Party.
