= Kakinada Rural Assembly constituency =

Constituency of the Andhra Pradesh Legislative Assembly, India

Coordinates: 16.90°N 82.17°E

Kakinada Rural
- Constituency No. 38 for the Andhra Pradesh Legislative Assembly
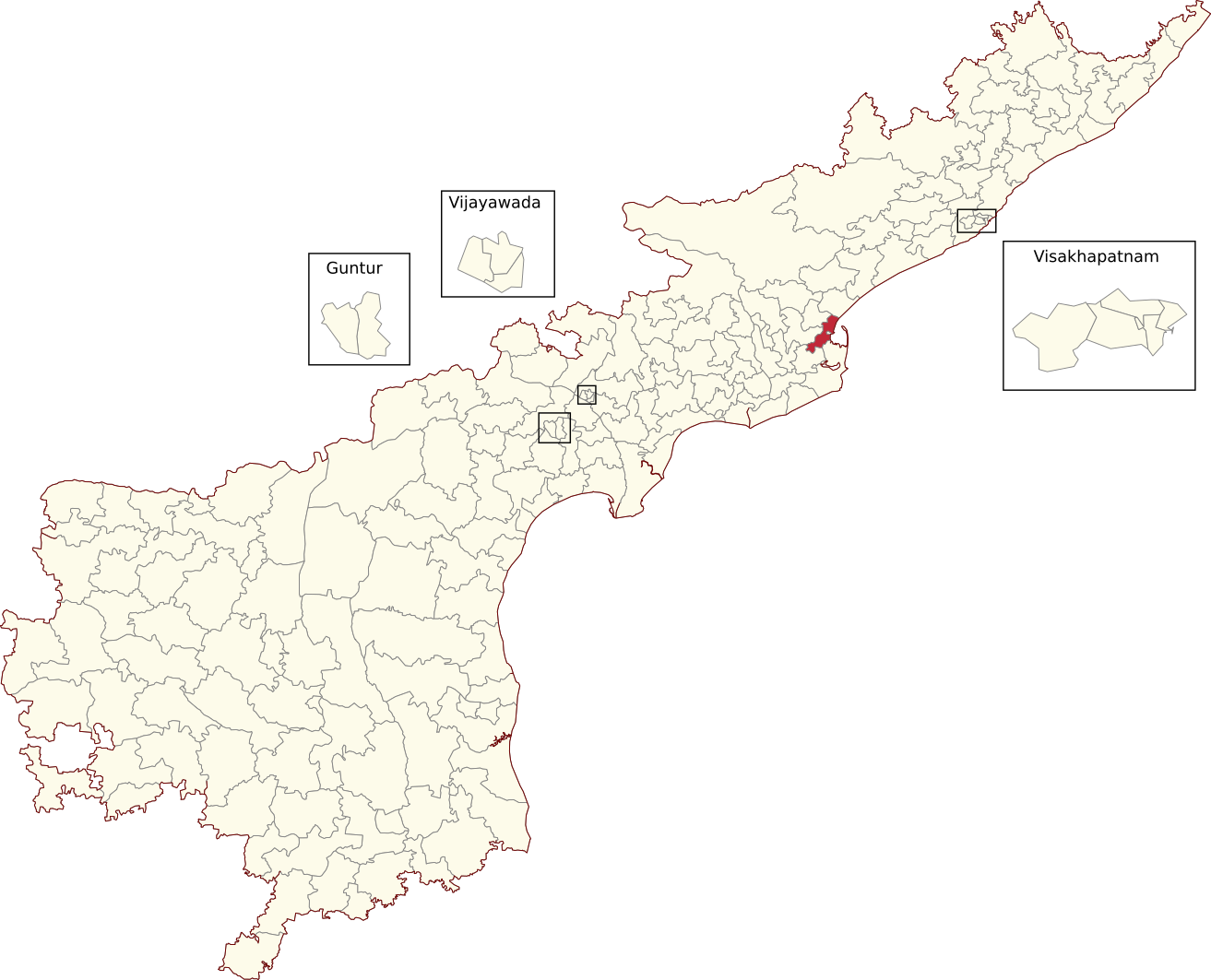
- Location of Kakinada Rural Assembly constituency within Andhra Pradesh

Constituency details
- Country: India
- Region: South India
- State: Andhra Pradesh
- District: Kakinada
- Lok Sabha constituency: Kakinada
- Established: 2008
- Total electors: 249,011
- Reservation: None

Member of Legislative Assembly
- 16th Andhra Pradesh Legislative Assembly
- Incumbent Pantham Venkateswara Rao
- Party: JSP
- Alliance: NDA
- Elected year: 2024

Kakinada Rural Assembly constituency is a constituency in Kakinada district of Andhra Pradesh that elects representatives to the Andhra Pradesh Legislative Assembly in India. It is one of the seven assembly segments of Kakinada Lok Sabha constituency.

Pantham Venkateswara Rao is the current MLA of the constituency, having won the 2024 Andhra Pradesh Legislative Assembly election from YSRCP party. As of 2019, there are a total of 249,011 electors in the constituency. The constituency was established in 2008, as per the Delimitation Orders (2008).

== Mandals ==
The three mandals that form the assembly constituency.

Mandals
Kakinada (urban) mandal (Part) Kakinada(M) Ward No. 66 to 70
Kakinada Rural
Karapa

== Members of the Legislative Assembly ==
Year	Member	Political party
2009	Kurasala Kannababu	Praja Rajyam Party
2014	Pilli Anantha Lakshmi	Telugu Desam Party
2019	Kurasala Kannababu	YSR Congress Party
2024	Pantham Venkateswara Rao	Jana Sena Party

== Election results ==
=== 2024 ===
2024 Andhra Pradesh Legislative Assembly election: Kakinada Rural
Party	Candidate	Votes	%	±%
JSP	Pantham Venkateswara Rao	134,414	65.11	
YSRCP	Kurasala Kannababu	62,374	30.21	
INC	Pilli Satya Lakshmi	2205	1.07	
Majority		74,086	35.88	
Turnout		2,06,439		
JSP gain from YSRCP		Swing		

=== 2019 ===
2019 Andhra Pradesh Legislative Assembly election: Kakinada Rural
Party	Candidate	Votes	%	±%
YSRCP	Kurasala Kannababu	74,068	40.14%	
TDP	Pilli Anantha Lakshmi	65,279	35.38%	
JSP	Pantam Venkateswara Rao (Nanaji)	40,001	22.09%	
Majority		8,789	4.76%	
Turnout		165,338	74.59	−0.75
YSRCP gain from TDP		Swing		

=== 2014 ===
2014 Andhra Pradesh Legislative Assembly election: Kakinada Rural
Party	Candidate	Votes	%	±%
TDP	Pilli Anantha Lakshmi	61,144	36.98	
YSRCP	Srinivasa Venu Gopala Krishna Chelluboyina	52,096	31.51	
Independent	Kurasala Kannababu	43,456	26.46	
Majority		9,048	5.47	
Turnout		184,487	74.08	−0.5
TDP gain from PRP		Swing		

=== 2009 ===
2009 Andhra Pradesh Legislative Assembly election: Kakinada Rural
Party	Candidate	Votes	%	±%
PRP	Kurasala Kannababu	53,494	38.25	
INC	Venkateswar Rao Nulukurthi	45,457	32.50	
TDP	Satyanarayana Murthy Pilli	28,691	20.59	
Majority		8,037	5.05	
PRP win (new seat)				

== See also ==
- List of constituencies of the Andhra Pradesh Legislative Assembly
