= Velangi =

- Village
- Interactive map of Velangi
- Location in Andhra Pradesh, India
- Coordinates: 16°52′01″N 82°06′37″E
- Country: India
- State: Andhra Pradesh
- District: Kakinada

Population (2001)
  - Total: 7,634

Languages
  - Official: Telugu
- Time zone: UTC+5:30 (IST)
- Postal code: 533260

Velangi is a village in the Godavari River delta, about 18 km South West of Kakinada in the State of Andhra Pradesh, India.

== Location ==
The village is in between Kakinada (north) and Ramachandrapuram (south). Some of the other villages around Velangi are Kurada, Siripuram, Endamuru, Mamidada, Chinna Kothauru, Peddakotthuru.

== Banks ==
- Andhra Bank
- State Bank of India

== Transportation ==
It is accessible by bus from Kakinada or Ramachandrapuram from where one can take a local bus (40 minutes) or taxi (25 minutes) or an auto-riksha (40 minutes).

Velangi is on the Kakinada-Kotipalli railway line, and has a station. The nearest major railway station is in Kakinada (19 km) and the nearest railway junction is Samalkot. For both the stations there are frequent trains to / from Visakhapatnam and Vijayawada.

The nearest airport is in Rajahmundry or Madhurapudi, 62 km away, the nearest international airport is at Visakhapatnam.

== Geography ==
Velangi is located at 16° 50' 13.60" N 82°8′28.97″E [1] It has an average elevation of 8 meters (26 feet).

== Educational Institutes ==
It has a one Elementary School and High School known as Merla Zilla Parishad Primary Upper Primary School, and Junior college, Bhanu Prakash Convent.

== Features ==
The village in known for its progressive farmers and the main occupation of residents is farming. It is surrounded by paddy fields irrigated by canals from the Godavari River. Rice is the major economic crop in the area.

Ancient temples of Draksharamam, Kotipalli, and Dwarapudi are close by. The village is also known for good cooks and cracker manufacturing.

== Festivals ==
Velangi is famous for its festivals (Mari Amma Jatra, Elephant Festival & Navarathri Festival) and melas that occur in every year. The Village deity is Mari Amma Talli, Pallla Allam Talli (sister of Mari Amma) Gonthallamma Talli, Dhan Amma Talli, and Sati Amma Talli.

Mari Amma Talli (Temple in Kotha Peta, Phittapuram Maharaja donated Innam Land to Potters, Dobhis, and Madigas to conduct a Jathra) Pallla Allam Talli Gonthallamma Talli Dhan Amma Talli Sati Amma Talli
