= Pithapuram Assembly constituency =

Constituency of the Andhra Pradesh Legislative Assembly, India

Coordinates: 17.12°N 82.52°E

Pithapuram
- Constituency No. 37 for the Andhra Pradesh Legislative Assembly
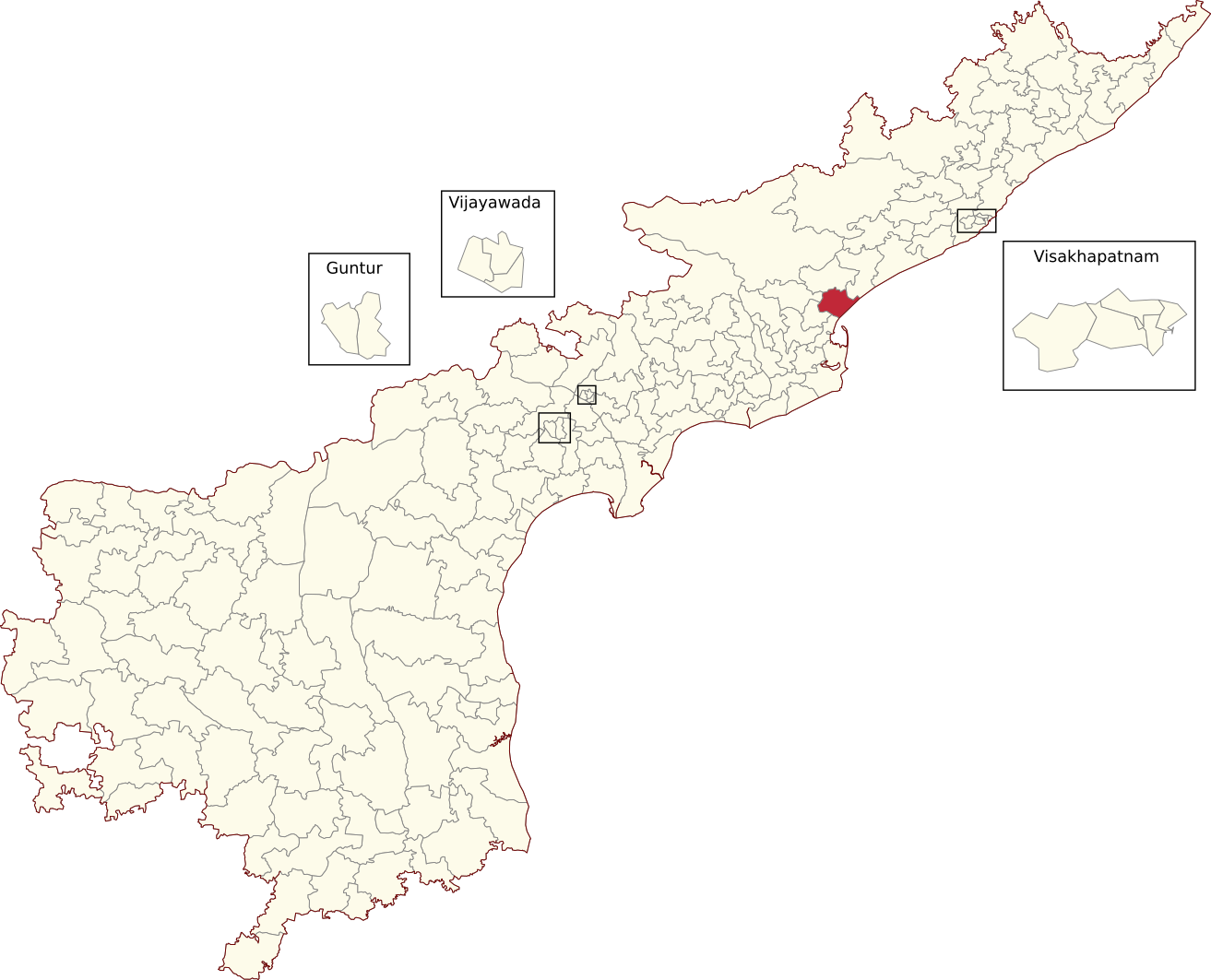

Constituency details
- Country: India
- Region: South India
- State: Andhra Pradesh
- District: Kakinada
- Lok Sabha constituency: Kakinada
- Established: 1951
- Total electors: 229,591
- Reservation: None

Member of Legislative Assembly
- 16th Andhra Pradesh Legislative Assembly
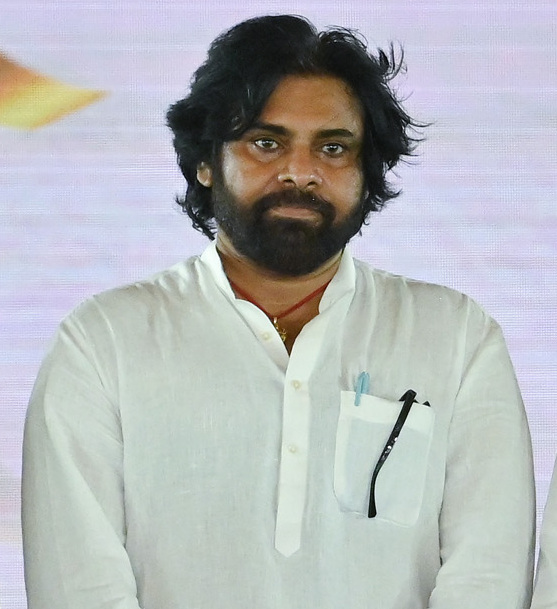
- Incumbent Pawan Kalyan; Deputy Chief Minister of Andhra Pradesh
- Party: JSP
- Alliance: NDA
- Elected year: 2024
- Preceded by: Pendem Dorababu

Pithapuram Assembly constituency is a constituency in Kakinada district of Andhra Pradesh that elects representatives to the Andhra Pradesh Legislative Assembly in India. It is one of the seven assembly segments of Kakinada Lok Sabha constituency.

Pawan Kalyan is the current MLA of the constituency, having won the 2024 Andhra Pradesh Legislative Assembly election from Janasena Party. As of 2024, there are a total of 230,188 electors in the constituency. The constituency was established in 1951, as per the Delimitation Orders (1951).

== Mandals ==
The three mandals that form the assembly constituency are:

Mandal
Gollaprolu
Pithapuram
Kothapalle

Mandals in Pithapuram Assembly Constituency

== Members of the Legislative Assembly ==
Year	Member	Political party
1952	R. V. Jagga Rao	Communist Party of India
1955	Vadrevu Gopalkrishna	Praja Party
1960 by-election	Peketi Thammiraju	Praja Party
1962	Rao Bhavanna	Indian National Congress
1967	Yalla Suryanarayanamurty	Indian National Congress
1972	Yalla Suryanarayanamurty	Indian National Congress
1978	Koppana Venkata Chandra Mohanarao	Indian National Congress (I)
1983	Venna Nageswara Rao	Telugu Desam Party
1985	Venna Nageswara Rao	Telugu Desam Party
1989	Koppana Venkata Chandra Mohanarao	Indian National Congress
1994	Venna Nageswara Rao	Telugu Desam Party
1999	Veera Bhadra Rao Sangisetti	Independent
2004	Pendem Dorababu	Bharatiya Janata Party
2009	Vanga Geetha	Praja Rajyam Party
2014	S. V. S. N. Varma	Independent
2019	Pendem Dorababu	YSR Congress Party
2024	Pawan Kalyan	Janasena Party

== Election results ==
=== 2024 ===
2024 Andhra Pradesh Legislative Assembly election: Pithapuram
Party	Candidate	Votes	%	±%
JSP	Pawan Kalyan	134,394	64.87	
YSRCP	Vanga Geetha Viswanath	64,115	30.95	
NOTA	None of the above	2,027	0.98	
INC	Madepalli Satyananda Rao	1,231	0.59	
Majority		70,279	33.92	
Turnout		207,169	86.63	
JSP gain from YSRCP		Swing		

=== 2019 ===
2019 Andhra Pradesh Legislative Assembly election: Pithapuram
Party	Candidate	Votes	%	±%
YSRCP	Pendem Dorababu	83,459	44.71	
TDP	S. V. S. N. Varma	68,467	36.68	
JSP	Makineedi Seshu Kumari	28,011	15.00	
Majority		14,992	8.03	
Turnout		186,682	83.31	
YSRCP gain from Independent		Swing		

=== 2014 ===
2014 Andhra Pradesh Legislative Assembly election: Pithapuram
Party	Candidate	Votes	%	±%
Independent	S. V. S. N. Varma	97,511	57.59	
YSRCP	Pendem Dorababu	50,431	29.78	
TDP	P. V. Viswam	15,187	8.90	
Majority		47,080	27.81	
Turnout		169,330	79.45	+1.16
Independent gain from INC		Swing		

=== 2009 ===
2009 Andhra Pradesh Legislative Assembly election: Pithapuram
Party	Candidate	Votes	%	±%
PRP	Vanga Geetha	46,623	31.19	
TDP	S. V. S. N. Varma	45,587	30.50	
INC	Mudragada Padmanabham	43,431	29.05	
Majority		1,036	0.69	
Turnout		149,479	78.29	+6.56
PRP gain from BJP		Swing		

=== 2004 ===
2004 Andhra Pradesh Legislative Assembly election: Pithapuram
Party	Candidate	Votes	%	±%
BJP	Pendem Dorababu	46,518	50.47	
INC	K. V. Chandra Mohana Rao	28,628	31.06	
Independent	Madepalli Rangababu	8,629	9.36	
Majority		17,899	19.41	
Turnout		92,182	71.73	+3.08
BJP gain from Independent		Swing		

=== 1999 ===
1999 Andhra Pradesh Legislative Assembly election: Pithapuram
Party	Candidate	Votes	%	±%
Independent	Veera Sangisetti	36,612	41.6	
BJP	Dorababu Pendem	32,199	36.6	▲35.3
INC	Devarapalli Rajarajeswari	17,087	19.4	▼18
Anna Telugu Desam Party	Venkateswara Rao Mogali	1,000	11.1	
Communist Party Of India (MARXIST-LENINIST) (LIBERATION)	Pilla Mariyamma	906	1.0	▼18
Independent	J.V. Kameswara Rao	132	0.2	
Majority		4,413	4.8	▼8.5
Turnout		92,690	72.4	▼1.5
Independent gain from TDP		Swing		

=== 1994 ===
1994 Andhra Pradesh Legislative Assembly election: Pithapuram
Party	Candidate	Votes	%	±%
TDP	Venna Nageswara Rao	43,905	50.9	▲6.3
INC	Sangisetti Veerabhadra Rao	32,277	37.4	▼14.9
BSP	Syamprasad Bandi	8,033	9.3	▲8.4
BJP	Bavavarapu Babu	1,109	1.3	
CPI(M-L)	Yegupati Arjunarao	380	0.4	
Independent	Pilli Raju	208	0.2	
Independent	Vanga Geeta	164	0.2	
Independent	Neelam Rao	113	0.1	▼0.1
Independent	Devarapalli Venkataramana Murty	47	0.1	
Majority		11,628	13.3	▲5.8
Turnout		87,493	73.9	▼0.7
TDP gain from INC		Swing		

=== 1989 ===
1989 Andhra Pradesh Legislative Assembly election: Pithapuram
Party	Candidate	Votes	%	±%
INC	Koppana Mohanarao	42,241	52.3	▲14
TDP	Venna Nageshwararao	35,987	44.6	▼14.9
Independent	Pilla Mariyamma	888	1.1	▲8.4
BSP	Medisetti Chandra Rao	685	0.9	
Independent	Talisetti Venkateswararao	466	0.6	
Independent	Neelam Murali Mohanrao	192	0.2	
Independent	Bandi Appayya	177	0.2	
Independent	Pilli Rainndra Kumar	141	0.2	
Majority		6,254	7.5	▼13.5
Turnout		83,357	74.6	▲4.2
INC gain from TDP		Swing		

=== 1985 ===
1985 Andhra Pradesh Legislative Assembly election: Pithapuram
Party	Candidate	Votes	%	±%
TDP	Venna Nageswara Rao	40,375	59.5	▼7.2
INC	Sangisetty Veerabhadararao	25,986	38.3	▲7.3
Independent	Bandi Appayya	544	0.8	▲7.3
Independent	Padmaraju Punyamanthula	346	0.5	
Independent	M. S. N. Sastry	307	0.5	▲0.1
Independent	Neelam Rao	300	0.4	
Majority		14,389	12.0	▼14.3
Turnout		68.618	70.4	▼1.9
TDP hold		Swing		

=== 1983 ===
1983 Andhra Pradesh Legislative Assembly election: Pithapuram
Party	Candidate	Votes	%	±%
TDP	Venna Nageswara Rao	43,318	66.7	
INC	Koppana Mohanarao (incumbent)	20,128	31	▼13
Independent	Bandili Sesharatanam	691	1.1	
JP	Madepalli Rama Rao	531	0.8	▼35.7
Independent	Satyanarayana Sastry Meka	243	0.4	
Majority		23,190	35.3	▲27.9
Turnout		65,650	72.3	▼4.9
TDP gain from INC(I)		Swing		

=== 1978 ===
1978 Andhra Pradesh Legislative Assembly election: Pithapuram
Party	Candidate	Votes	%	±%
INC(I)	Koppana Mohanarao	28,585	44	
JP	Peketi Thammiraju	23,685	36.5	▲35.3
Independent	Singisetty Veerabhadra Rao	9,897	15.2	▼18
INC	Yella Suryanarayanamurthy (incumbent)	2,754	4.2	▼33.79
Majority		4,900	7.4	▲4.06
Turnout		66,028	77.2	▲3.48
INC(I) gain from INC		Swing		

=== 1972 ===
1972 Andhra Pradesh Legislative Assembly election: Pithapuram
Party	Candidate	Votes	%	±%
INC	Yalla Suryanarayanamurty	21,103	37.99	▼2.8
CPI	Venkata Rao	19,251	34.65	▲14.19
Independent	Thammiraju Peketi	14,205	25.57	▼15.52
RPI(K)	Venkateswara Rao Pitta	996	1.79	
Majority		1,852	3.34	▼1.34
Turnout		55,555	73.72	▼4.96
INC hold		Swing		

=== 1967 ===
1967 Andhra Pradesh Legislative Assembly election: Pithapuram
Party	Candidate	Votes	%	±%
INC	Yalla Suryanarayanamurty	21,053	40.79	▼16.45
Independent	Peketi Thammiraju	18,636	36.11	▼6.64
CPI	M. Suryarao	10,559	20.46	
Independent	S. Sanaboyina	1,365	2.64	
Majority		2,417	4.68	▼9.81
Turnout		51,613	78.68	
INC hold		Swing		

=== 1962 ===
1962 Andhra Pradesh Legislative Assembly election: Pithapuram
Party	Candidate	Votes	%	±%
INC	Rao Bhavanna	30,010	57.24	
Independent	Peketi Thammiraju	22,414	42.75	
Majority		7,596	14.49	▼14.75
Turnout		52,424		
INC gain from KMPP		Swing		

=== 1955 ===
1955 Andhra State Legislative Assembly election: Pithapuram
Party	Candidate	Votes	%	±%
KMPP	Vadrevu Gopalkrishna	23,773	64.62	▲43.52
CPI	Kandkikonda Bulliraju	13,018	35.38	▼3.17
Majority		10,755	29.24	▲16.03
Turnout		36,791	62.95	▲3.97
KMPP gain from CPI		Swing		

=== 1952 ===
1952 Madras State Legislative Assembly election: Pithapuram
Party	Candidate	Votes	%	±%
CPI	R. V. Jagga Rao	18,920	38.55	
INC	R. Atachayya Rao	12,438	25.35	25.35
KMPP	V. G. Krishna	10,357	21.10	
Independent	K. Rajalingeswara Rao	3,373	6.87	
Socialist Party (India)	C. Bhavanarao	1,445	2.94%	
KLP	Triupathi Rao	1,375	2.80	
Independent	C. Sathiraju	1,166	2.38%	
Margin of victory		6,482	13.21	
Turnout		49,074	66.92	
Registered electors		73,335		
CPI win (new seat)				
