= Mosalikanti Thirumala Rao =

Indian politician and freedom activist

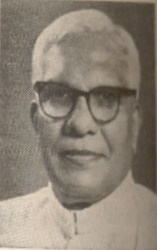

Member of Parliament
- Preceded by: Chelikani Venkata Rama Rao
- Succeeded by: M. S. Sanjeevi Rao
- Constituency: Kakinada constituency

Member of Constituent Assembly of India
- In office 9 December 1946 – 24 January 1950

Personal details
- Born: 29 January 1901 Pithapuram, Godavari District, Madras Presidency, British India (Now East Godavari district, Andhra Pradesh, India)
- Died: 1970 (aged 68–69)
- Party: Indian National Congress
- Spouse: Narasubayamma Velala
- Children: 3; 1 son and 2 daughters

Mosalikanti Thirumala Rao (Telugu: మొసలికంటి తిరుమలరావు) (29 January 1901 – 1970) was an Indian freedom activist and Parliament member.

== Life Sketch ==
He was born to Shri Bayanna Pantulu in Pithapuram, East Godavari district, Andhra Pradesh, India.

He joined Indian Independence movement on the call of Mahatma Gandhi and was jailed many times as a result of his participation.

He was elected president of District of East Godavari Congress Committee twice. He was Member of Central Legislative Assembly, 1937–40; Council of States. 1945–47; Constituent Assembly of India 1948–50 and Provisional Parliament, 1950–52. He was elected thrice from the Kakinada constituency for 2nd Lok Sabha, 3rd Lok Sabha and 4th Lok Sabha as member of Indian National Congress and served the ministry.

He was Deputy Minister of Food and Agriculture, Government of India between 1950 and 1952. He was Lieutenant Governor of Vindhya Pradesh in 1956.

He has translated the God Speaks by Avatar Meher Baba into Telugu language.
