= Karakuduru =

- village
- Interactive map of Karakuduru
- Coordinates: 16°56′48″N 82°09′11″E
- Country: India
- State: Andhra Pradesh
- District: Kakinada

Population
  - Total: 5,400

Languages
  - Official: Telugu
- Time zone: UTC+5:30 (IST)
- PIN: 533006
- Telephone code: 91-884
- Vehicle registration: AP5
- Nearest city: Kakinada
- Literacy: 70%%
- Lok Sabha constituency: Rajahmandry
- Vidhan Sabha constituency: Anaparti

Karakuduru is a village near Kakinada in Kakinada district, Andhra Pradesh, India. Main occupation of this village is agriculture. The village is situated at Kakinada-paina state highway. Its comes under to peddapudi mandal. The village is full of green lush lands. The urbanization may affect the green lands of Karakuduru. Karakuduru has many canals. Nearest city from this village is Kakinada, with a distance of 9 kilometres (5.6 mi).

== See also ==
- Aratlakatta
