= Aratlakatta =

- Village
- Interactive map of Aratlakatta
- Location in Andhra Pradesh, India
- Coordinates: 16.936021°N 82.163205°E
- Country: India
- State: Andhra Pradesh
- District: Kakinada
- Mandal: Karapa

Population (2011)
  - Total: 5,547

Languages
  - Official: Telugu
- Time zone: UTC+5:30 (IST)
- PIN: 533016
- Telephone code: 91-88
- Vehicle registration: AP
- Nearest city: Kakinada

Aratlakatta is a village in Karapa mandal, located in Kakinada district Indian state of Andhra Pradesh.
