= Vemulawada, Kakinada district =

- town
- Interactive map of Vemulawada, Kakinada district
- Country: India
- State: Andhra Pradesh
- District: Kakinada district

Population
  - Total: 2,500

Languages
  - Official: Telugu
- Time zone: UTC(+5:30) (IST)
- PIN: 533462
- Area code: +91-884
- Vehicle registration: AP05 (Former); AP39 (from 30 January 2019)

Vemulawada is a village in Karapa mandal, Kakinada district, Andhra Pradesh. It is close to Daksharamam. It is located 13 km towards west from the Port city of Kakinada, which is the district headquarters, and it is at a distance of 4 km from Karapa, the Mandal headquarters. Nearby towns are Kakinada to the east and Samarlakota to the west. The Karapa mandal is adjacent to the Samarlakota Mandal. The village is located close to the natural drain Tulyabhaga or Jamadagni and in close proximity to the Temple (Bhimeswara Temple) town of Drakshramam close to river Godavari in Kakinada District of Andhra Pradesh. The famous temple of Sri Chalukya Kumararama in which the deity Sri Bhimeswara Swamy is worshipped, is well known and is considered as one of the ‘Pancharama Kshetras’. The temple is at a distance of one KM from the Samarlakota( which is also called Samalkota) railway station. Details of the temple are available in the following Wikipedia articles -1 . Pancharama Kshetras, 2. Kumararama, 3. Samalkot, 4. Temples of Andhra Pradesh.

Vemulavada of Kakinada district and its famous temple are often confused with another town also called Vemulavada (originally Lemulawada or Lembulawada) in Karimnagar district of the State of Telangana and the Sri Rajarajeswara Swamy temple available there, in many web sites.
