= M. M. Pallam Raju =

Indian politician

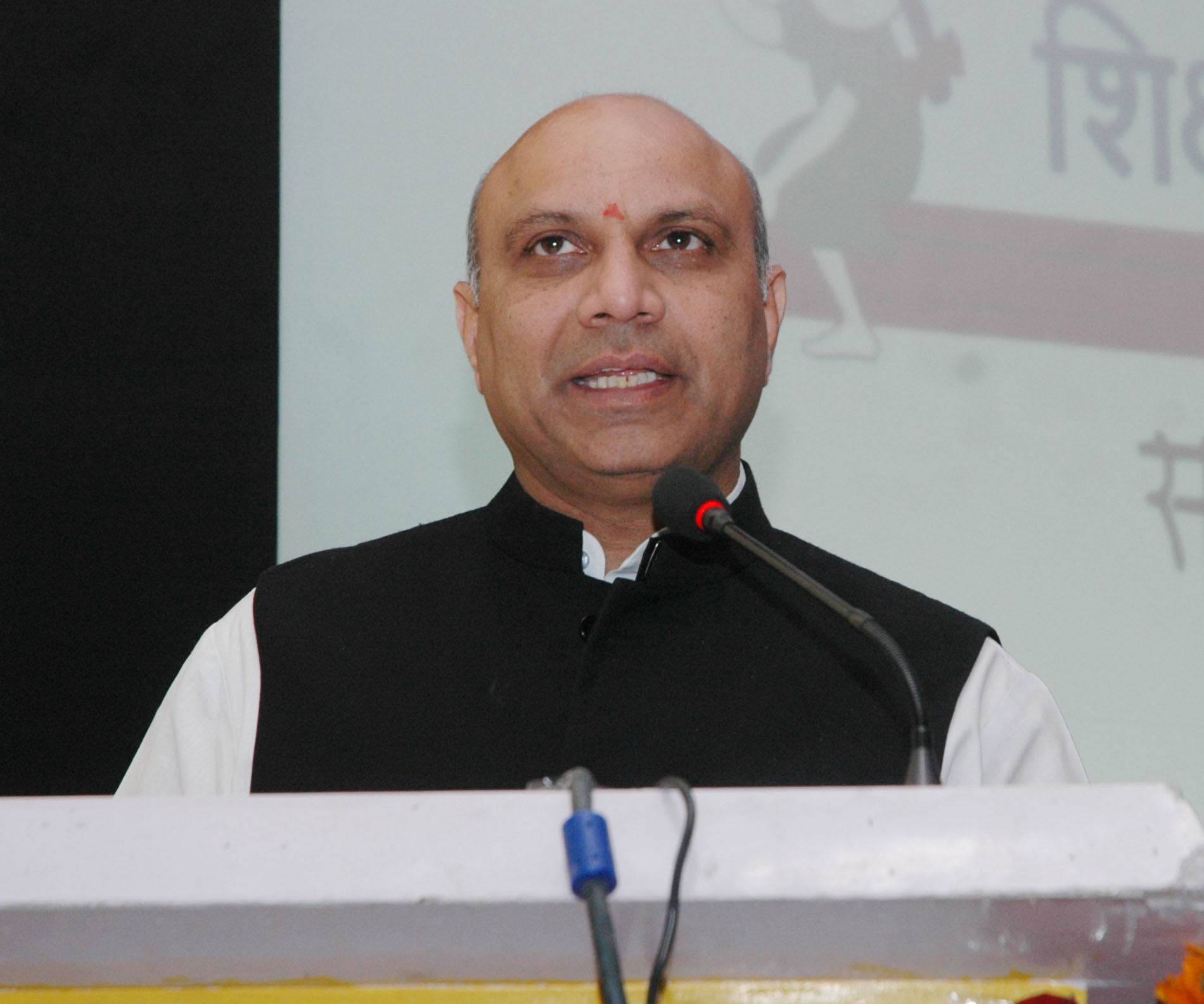
- Pallam Raju in 2014

Union Minister of Human Resource Development
- In office 29 October 2012 – 26 May 2014
- Prime Minister: Manmohan Singh
- Preceded by: Kapil Sibal
- Succeeded by: Smriti Irani

Union Minister of State for Defence
- In office 29 January 2006 – 28 October 2012
- Prime Minister: Manmohan Singh
- Minister: A. K. Antony
- Preceded by: Bijoy Krishna Handique
- Succeeded by: Jitendra Singh

Member of Parliament, Lok Sabha
- In office 2004 - 2014
- Preceded by: Mudragada Padmanabham
- Succeeded by: Thota Narasimham
- Constituency: Kakinada
- In office 1989 - 1991
- Preceded by: Thota Gopala Krishna
- Succeeded by: Thota Subba Roa
- Constituency: Kakinada

Personal details
- Born: Mangapati Mallipudi Pallam Raju; 24 January 1962 (age 64) Pitapuram, Andhra Pradesh, India
- Party: Indian National Congress
- Spouse: Mamatha
- Children: 1 daughter & 1 son
- Education: Temple University (MBA)
- As of 16 September 2006

Mallipudi Mangapati Pallam Raju (born 24 January 1962) is an Indian politician who served as the Cabinet Minister for Human Resources Development and Minister of State for Defence in the Central Government. He is a member of the 9th, 14th and 15th Lok Sabha of India. He represented the Kakinada constituency of Andhra Pradesh and is a member of the Indian National Congress.

== Early life and education ==
Pallam Raju was born at CBM-Christian Medical Centre, Pithapuram, East Godavari district of Andhra Pradesh, India. Born into a political family, he is the eldest among two children. His grandfather, Late Mallipudi Pallam Raju was a freedom fighter and his father Shri M. S. Sanjeevi Rao was a Union Minister in the Government of India (1982–1984).

He finished his schooling from The Hyderabad Public School, Begumpet (HPS), (1971–1979). He earned his undergraduate degree in Electronics & Communication Engineering from Andhra University, Visakhapatnam in 1983. He later earned an MBA from Fox School of Business and Management at Temple University in 1985.

He was an NCC cadet and a keen sportsman. Pallam Raju represented his school and college in several athletic and football tournaments in the country.

== Career ==
=== Initial career in computers and information technology ===
Being an electronics and communication engineer, Pallam Raju started his career in the IT field. He worked in Philadelphia and Boston in the USA and in Oslo, Norway, in the field of Computers and Information Technology. He started his career as a research assistant at Temple University, USA (1985–86). He then worked as a research associate at the Federal Group Incorporated, a management consulting firm at South Natick, USA from 1986–87. He was a Sales Coordinator for the international operations of a computer company, Norsk Data A.S. at Oslo; Norway. He has also been a successful entrepreneur in IT. In 1999, he started and ran the Indian operations of TTM (India) Private Limited (ASIC Design Services), a US based chip design services company at Secunderabad in Andhra Pradesh till he was inducted as the Minister of State for Defense in the United Progressive Alliance government.

=== Political career ===
His entry into politics was circumstantial. Though he came from a political lineage he wasn't encouraged to join politics. Having lost his mother early, he came back to India, end of 1988, when his father had a stroke. The general elections were in 1989 and he was encouraged by the party to contest. The decision was finally his. Then aged 27, he felt there couldn't be a better reason to return to the country.

=== First term in the 9th Lok Sabha (1989–1991) ===
Starting out as a novice in 1989, he went on to win the election and was the youngest Member of Parliament in the 9th Lok Sabha. Over the years, he has held several important positions in the state and national units of the Congress and been on boards of successful Public Limited Companies. He was a member on the Committee on Science and Technology and Consultative Committee, Ministry of Food Processing Industries (1990).

He has held important positions in the state and national units of the Congress and was on the boards of successful Public Limited Companies. He was a director on the boards of Indian Airlines and Air India between 1994 and 1997. Between 1995 and 2000, he was the General Secretary of the Andhra Pradesh Congress Committee (A.P.C.C.) He was a Member of the All India Congress Committee (A.I.C.C.) from 1997 to 2000. In 2000, he was the chairman of the Science and Technology Cell, Andhra Pradesh Congress Committee (A.P.C.C.)

=== Second term in the 14th Lok Sabha (2004–2009) ===
In 2004, he was re-elected to 14th Lok Sabha (2nd term). During this term, he was a member of the General Purposes Committee and a member of the Committee on Papers laid on the Table. He was also the chairman of the Department of Policy Planning and Coordination (DEPPCO) in the All India Congress Committee (AICC). Between August 2004 and January 2006, he served as the chairman of the Parliamentary Standing Committee on Information Technology which comprises the Departments of Information Technology, Communications & Posts and Information & Broadcasting.

In January 2006, he was inducted into the Union (Indian Federal) Council of Ministers in the government headed by Prime Minister Manmohan Singh as Minister of State for Defense. During his tenure as the Minister of State for Defense, in 2008 Pallam Raju visited Lebanon to meet the Indian peacekeepers who were part of the UN Interim Force in Lebanon (UNIFIL). He was the first to do so in five years. India has one infantry battalion deployed in charge of the eastern position of South Lebanon. In May 2008, he headed the delegation from the ministry and addressed the important Shangri La Dialogue (Annual Conference of Defense Ministers from the world) in Singapore.

=== Third term in the 15th Lok Sabha (2009–2014) ===
In May 2009, he was re-elected to the 15th Lok Sabha for the 3rd term. He continued as the Minister of State for Defense for the 2nd consecutive term. He led the Indian delegation to the Paris Air Show, France in June 2009.

=== Tenure as Union Minister for Human Resource Development ===
In October 2012, he was sworn in as the Union Minister for Human Resource Development. Some of the important milestones during his tenure include the Rashtriya Uchchatar Shiksha Abhiyan (RUSA), which was set up to provide higher education to deserving students. Under the Direct Benefit Transfer (DBT) scheme, Fellowships and Scholarships were given to over 100,000 students, by transferring the corresponding amounts directly to their bank accounts. Training was imparted to 207,000 students through Polytechnics as a part of the Community Development Scheme (CDS) during the academic year of 2012–13.

The National Mission on Education through Information and Communication Technology (NMEICT) project was another important milestone. Connectivity was provided to 20,685 colleges through the NMEICT project and efforts are on to start DTH Television channels.

Article 21-A and the Right To Education Act came into effect in April 2010, the implementation of this Act has seen as many as 230 million children enrolled in schools. The HRD Ministry and the government has focused on creating capacity in education in the last few years and has achieved reasonable success.

=== International sphere ===
In the international sphere, Pallam Raju represented India in the United Nations General Assembly at New York City (October 2004). In May 2005, he represented the country at the South Asian Free Media Association (SAFMA) Conference in Pakistan. In November 2005, he was the leader of the MP delegation to Tokyo, Japan which was organised by the Confederation of Indian Industry (CII) and the Sasakawa Peace Foundation (SPF). In November 2005, he was a member of the delegation to Beijing, China for the Conference on Globalization which was jointly organised by the Konrad Adeneur Foundation (KAF) of Germany and the Institute of Peace Studies, India.

== Electoral History ==
=== Lok Sabha ===
Year	Constituency	Party	Votes	%	Opponent	Party	Votes	%	Result	Margin	%
1989	Kakinada	INC	3,83,681	54.45	Thota Gopala Krishna	TDP	3,00,698	42.67	Won	+82,983	+11.78
1991	Kakinada	INC	2,52,040	42.85	Thota Subbarao	TDP	2,87,357	48.85	Lost	-35,317	-6.00
1998	Kakinada	INC	1,93,178	24.01	Krishnamraju U.V.	BJP	3,30,381	41.06	Lost	-1,37,203	-17.05
2004	Kakinada	INC	4,10,982	49.38	Mudragada Padmanabham	TDP	3,53,730	42.50	Won	+57,252	+6.88
2009	Kakinada	INC	3,23,607	33.51	Chalamalasetty Sunil	PRP	2,89,563	29.99	Won	+34,044	+3.52
2014	Kakinada	INC	19,754	1.79	Thota Narasimham	TDP	5,14,402	46.69	Lost	-4,94,648	-44.90
2024	Kakinada	INC	21,109	1.61	Tangella Uday Srinivas	JSP	7,29,699	55.59	Lost	-7,08,590	-53.98

== Political and social views ==
The bifurcation of Andhra Pradesh and the creation of Telangana state saw widespread agitation in the Seemandhra region and the demand for a united Andhra Pradesh. Raju elected from Kakinada in the Seemandhra region, has strongly opposed the division of Andhra Pradesh and had been critical of the way the government was going about the issue. Raju said the Cabinet had taken the decision to bifurcate the state in great haste without understanding the concerns of the region and considering the sentiments of the people. However, he continued to remain in the government and was criticised for not resigning. Raju has stood by his decision not to quit and is quoted to have said that though tendering one's resignation is considered a popular move with the election round the corner. He preferred to remain in the government and represent the views of his people at this crucial juncture. He preferred that the people of his constituency take into account the work and development in the constituency in the last two consecutive terms. He is said to be one of the few MP's to have completely used his MP LADS (Member of Parliament, Local Area Development Fund Scheme) for the development of his constituency.

Education

Pallam Raju Prothsaham

Pallam Raju Protsaham is a foundation which organises vocational training.

Appathon

The programme trains college students to develop apps for smart phones.

== Personal life ==
Pallam Raju is married to Mamatha Mallipudi and has a daughter Vahini Raje and a son named Jatin Sanjeevi Rao.

Political offices
Preceded by Kapil Sibal	Minister of Human Resource Development; 2012–2014	Succeeded by Smriti Irani
