= Mudragada Padmanabham =

Indian politician (1953–2026)

Member of Parliament, Lok Sabha
- In office 6 October 1999 – 16 May 2004
- Preceded by: Krishnam Raju
- Succeeded by: M. M. Pallam Raju
- Constituency: Kakinada, Andhra Pradesh

Member of Legislative Assembly, Andhra Pradesh
- In office 1978–1994
- Preceded by: Varupula Jogiraju
- Succeeded by: Parvatha Subbarao
- Constituency: Prathipadu

Personal details
- Born: Mudragada Padmanabham; 22 January 1953 Kirlampudi, Madras State, India (present day Andhra Pradesh, India)
- Died: 14 July 2026 (aged 73) Hyderabad, Telangana, India
- Party: YSR Congress Party (since 2024)
- Other political affiliations: Bharatiya Janata Party (1995–1999); Indian National Congress (1989–1995; 2008–2009); Telugu Desam Party (1982–1989; 1999–2008); Janata Party (1978–1982)

Mudragada Padmanabham (22 January 1953 – 14 July 2026) was an Indian politician who was a Member of Parliament from Kakinada. He was also a political activist known for campaigning for the inclusion of the Kapu community in the Backward Class (BC) category.

== Early life ==
Mudragada Padmanabham was born into a Telugu-Kapu family in Kirlampudi village, in the East Godavari district of Andhra Pradesh, India. He completed his schooling in his village. His father, Veera Raghava Rao, was popularly known as Kirlampudi Munciff. His father was elected twice as an Independent MLA from the Prattipadu Assembly constituency, in 1962 and 1967.

== Career ==
Padmanabham was a four-time Member of Legislative Assembly, one-time Member of Parliament and Minister in Telugu Desam Party and Indian National Congress governments. He started his political career as Janata Party MLA in 1978. Later, when N. T. Rama Rao started Telugu Desam Party in 1982, he joined and won both 1983 and 1985 elections from Prattipadu Assembly constituency in East Godavari District.

He resigned his Ministry in N. T. Rama Rao's cabinet and started Praja Rakshana Samiti. Later, he started the Telugu Nadu Party with K. E. Krishnamurthy and Kunduru Jana Reddy, who are now with the Telugu Desam and the Congress, respectively. In 1988, he hosted a reception at Prattipadu for the late Rajiv Gandhi, then Prime Minister. He was elected as an MLA and also held a Ministerial berth.

Padmanabham lost for the first time as an MLA in 1994 and did not contest again from Prattipadu constituency. He later associated himself with Kapunadu and later with the Bharatiya Janata Party (BJP). While working with BJP, he played a key role in the election of Krishnam Raju from Kakinada.

He was with BJP for four years. He attended Rashtriya Swayamsevak Sangh Sakhas during this period. Later in 1999, he represented Telugu Desam in the Lok Sabha from Kakinada and then lost in 2004 elections from the same constituency.

Padmanabham joined the YSR Congress Party in the presence of party president and chief minister Y. S. Jagan Mohan Reddy at Tadepalli camp office on 15 March 2024. Upon his joining the YSRCP, the president of the Kapu Sankshema Sangam, Puli Sriramulu denounced him to the community.

== Death ==
Padmanabham died in Hyderabad on 14 July 2026, at the age of 73, after undergoing treatment for a kidney-related illness.
