= Pilli Ananta Lakshmi =

Indian politician

Pilli Anantha Lakshmi (born 1971) is an Indian politician from Andhra Pradesh. She was a two-time MLA of Telugu Desam Party. She won the 2014 Andhra Pradesh Legislative Assembly election from Kakinada Rural Assembly constituency in East Godavari district. She lost the 2019 Andhra Pradesh Legislative Assembly election.

== Early life and education ==
Lakshmi was born in Madhapatnam, Samalkota mandal, East Godavari district. Her father Venkataswamy resides in Vakalapudi. She married Pilli Veera Venkata Sathyanarayana Murthy, alias Sathibabu. They have a son, Radhakrishna.

== Career ==
Lakshmi began her political career with Telugu Desam Party in 1999. She won the 1999 Andhra Pradesh Legislative Assembly election representing Telugu Desam Party from Sampara Assembly Constituency, which later became Kakinada Rural after delimitation. She won for the second time in 2014. Contesting again on Telugu Desam Party ticket, she won the 2014 Andhra Pradesh Legislative Assembly election defeating Chelluboyina Srinivasa Venugopala Krishna of YSR Congress Party by a margin of 9,048 votes. She contested again on TDP ticket but lost the 2019 Andhra Pradesh Legislative Assembly election to Kurasala Kannababu of YSRCP by a margin of 8,789 votes. In April 2015, she was nominated as a board member of the Tirupati Thirumala Devasthanam Board for a period of one year.
