= Nimmakayala Chinarajappa =

Indian politician (born 1953)

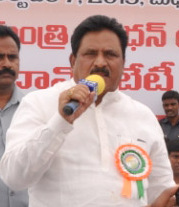
- Chinarajappa at a public meeting

7th Deputy Chief Minister of Andhra Pradesh
- In office 8 June 2014 – 29 May 2019 Serving with K. E. Krishnamurthy
- Governor: E. S. L. Narasimhan
- Chief Minister: N. Chandrababu Naidu
- Preceded by: President rule
- Succeeded by: Pilli Subhash Chandra Bose; Alla Nani; K. Narayana Swamy; Pushpasreevani Pamula; Amzath Basha Shaik Bepari

Minister of Home affairs Government of Andhra Pradesh
- In office 8 June 2014 – 29 May 2019
- Governor: E. S. L. Narasimhan
- Chief Minister: N. Chandrababu Naidu
- Preceded by: President's rule
- Succeeded by: Mekathoti Sucharita

Member of Legislative Assembly Andhra Pradesh
- Incumbent
- Assumed office 2014
- Preceded by: Pantam Gandhi Mohan
- Constituency: Peddapuram

Member of Legislative Council Andhra Pradesh
- In office 2007–2014
- Chairman: A. Chakrapani
- Deputy: Mohammed Jani
- Leader of the House: Y. S. Rajasekhara Reddy; Konijeti Rosaiah; Kiran Kumar Reddy
- Constituency: Andhra Pradesh

Personal details
- Born: 1 October 1953 (age 73) Amalapuram, East Godavari District
- Party: Telugu Desam Party
- Parent: N. Venkata Rangayya (father)
- Website: https://nchinarajappa.com/

Nimmakayala Chinarajappa (born 1 October 1953) is an Indian politician. He served as the Deputy Chief Minister and Home Minister of Andhra Pradesh from 2014 to 2019. He is currently an MLA of Telugu Desam Party, representing Peddapuram assembly constituency in the Andhra Pradesh Legislative Assembly.

== Personal life and education ==
Chinarajappa hails from Kakinada district. He is a resident of Vijayawada. He completed his post-graduation in Master of Arts. Well known for his simplicity and commitment for social causes.

== Political career ==
Nimmakayala Chinna Rajappa worked as the district president of Telugu Desam Party for two decades. He is considered as a grass root leader and is highly accessible to the members of his constituency. Always focused on improving the outcomes and standing by the people where appropriate. He is very well regarded by leaders from all the parties. He was also a Member of Legislative Council. He won the 2014 Andhra Pradesh Legislative Assembly election by defeating Thota Subbarao Naidu of YSR Congress Party, with a margin of over 10000 votes. In 2024 elections, Nimmakayala Chinna Rajappa secured 105,685 votes against Davuluri Dorababu of the YSRCP who secured 65,234, winning with a margin of over 40,000 votes, highest in the region.
