= Penuguduru =

- Village
- Interactive map of Penuguduru
- Location in Andhra Pradesh, India Penuguduru (India)
- Coordinates: 16.907425°N 82.19704°E
- Country: India
- State: Andhra Pradesh
- District: Kakinada district
- Mandal: Karapa

Languages
  - Official: Telugu
- Time zone: UTC+5:30 (IST)
- PIN: 533016

Penuguduru is a village situated in Karapa mandal, Kakinada district, in Andhra Pradesh State, India.
