= Peddapuram Assembly constituency =

Constituency of the Andhra Pradesh Legislative Assembly, India

Coordinates: 17.08°N 82.14°E

Peddapuram
- Constituency No. 39 for the Andhra Pradesh Legislative Assembly
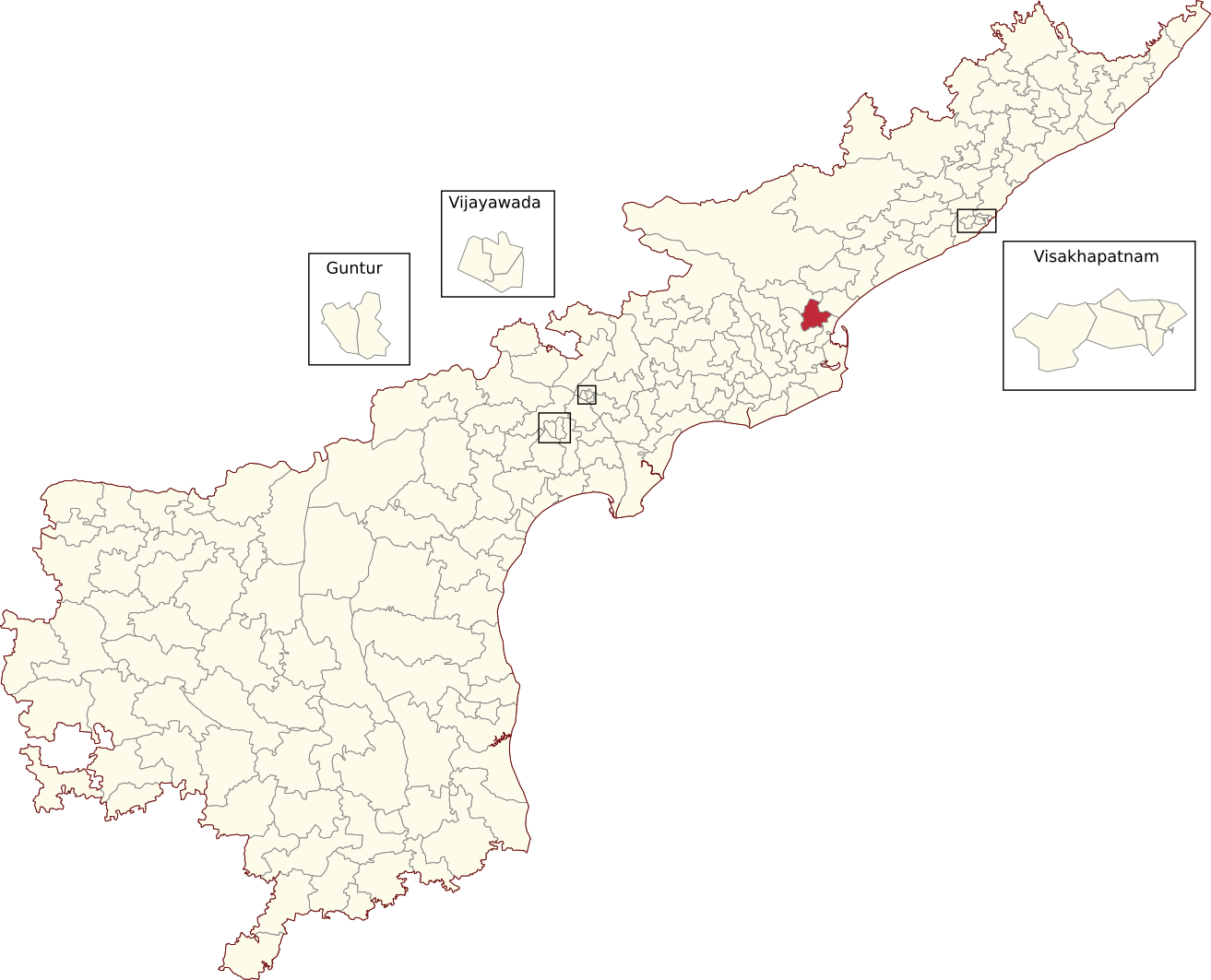
- Location of Peddapuram Assembly constituency within Andhra Pradesh

Constituency details
- Country: India
- Region: South India
- State: Andhra Pradesh
- District: Kakinada
- Lok Sabha constituency: Kakinada
- Established: 1951
- Total electors: 201,863
- Reservation: None

Member of Legislative Assembly
- 16th Andhra Pradesh Legislative Assembly
- Incumbent Nimmakayala Chinarajappa
- Party: TDP
- Alliance: NDA
- Elected year: 2024

Peddapuram Assembly constituency is a constituency in Kakinada district of Andhra Pradesh that elects representatives to the Andhra Pradesh Legislative Assembly in India. It is one of the seven assembly segments of Kakinada Lok Sabha constituency.

Nimmakayala Chinarajappa is the current MLA of the constituency, having won the 2024 Andhra Pradesh Legislative Assembly election from Telugu Desam Party. As of 2024, there are a total of 201,863 electors in the constituency. The constituency was established in 1951, as per the Delimitation Orders (1951).

== Mandals ==
The two mandals that form the assembly constituency are:

Mandal
Samalkota
Peddapuram

== Members of the Legislative Assembly ==
Year	Member	Political party
1952	Thota Ramaswami	Indian National Congress
1955	Durvasula Venkatasubbarao	Communist Party of India
1962	Pantham Padmanabham	Indian National Congress
1967	Vundavalli Narayana Murthy	Communist Party of India
1972	Kondapalli Krishnamurty	Indian National Congress
1978	Vundavalli Narayana Murthy	Indian National Congress (I)
1983	Balasu Ramarao	Telugu Desam Party
1985	Balasu Ramarao	Telugu Desam Party
1989	Pantham Padmanabham	Indian National Congress
1994	Boddu Ramarao	Telugu Desam Party
1999	Boddu Ramarao	Telugu Desam Party
2004	Thota Gopal Krishna	Indian National Congress
2009	Pantam Gandhi Mohan	Praja Rajyam Party
2014	Nimmakayala Chinarajappa	Telugu Desam Party
2019	Nimmakayala Chinarajappa	Telugu Desam Party
2024	Nimmakayala Chinarajappa	Telugu Desam Party

== Election results ==
=== 1952 ===
1952 Madras State Legislative Assembly election: Peddapuram
Party	Candidate	Votes	%	±%
INC	Thota Ramaswami	10,337	29.66%	29.66%
Independent	D. V. Subha Rao	8,636	24.78%	
KLP	Gokina Chandra Rao	7,274	20.87%	
Socialist Party (India)	Pantham Padmanabham	4,632	13.29%	
KMPP	Prativadi Bhayarkare Venkachar Yulu Alias Bhayankaracharyulu	3,972	11.40%	
Margin of victory		1,701	4.88%	
Turnout		34,851	63.75%	
Registered electors		54,665		
INC win (new seat)				

=== 1955 ===
1955 Andhra State Legislative Assembly election: Peddapuram
Party	Candidate	Votes	%	±%
CPI	Durvasula Venkatasubbarao	18,745	44.59	
KLP	Challa Apparao	17,570	41.80	▲20.93
PSP	Katha Murty	5,721	13.61	
Majority		1,175	2.79	▼2.09
Turnout		42,036	67.84	▲4.09
CPI gain from INC		Swing		

=== 1962 ===
1962 Andhra Pradesh Legislative Assembly election: Peddapuram
Party	Candidate	Votes	%	±%
INC	Pantham Padmanabham	32,269	78.49	
CPI	Durvasula Venkata Subbarao	8,842	21.50	▼23.09
Majority		23,427	56.99	▲54.20
Turnout		41,111		
INC gain from CPI		Swing		

=== 1967 ===
1967 Andhra Pradesh Legislative Assembly election: Peddapuram
Party	Candidate	Votes	%	±%
CPI	Vundavalli Narayana Murthy	23,774	40.90	▲19.40
INC	Krishnamurty Kondapalli	21,470	36.94	▼41.55
Independent	S. Veerraju	9,423	16.21	
CPI(M)	Bedampudi Israel	2,370	4.08	
SWA	C.V. Allaka	1,090	1.88	
Majority		2,304	3.96	▲56.99
Turnout		58,127	76.62	
CPI gain from INC		Swing		

=== 1972 ===
1972 Andhra Pradesh Legislative Assembly election: Peddapuram
Party	Candidate	Votes	%	±%
INC	Kondapalli Krishnamurty	44,274	68.87	▲31.93
CPI	Vundavalli Narayana Murthy	17,326	26.95	▼13.95
Independent	Bedampudi Israel	2,686	4.18	
Majority		26,948	41.92	▲37.96
Turnout		64,286	75.12	▼1.50
INC gain from CPI		Swing		

=== 1978 ===
1978 Andhra Pradesh Legislative Assembly election: Peddapuram
Party	Candidate	Votes	%	±%
INC(I)	Vundavalli Narayana Murthy	43,595	58.2	▲31.25
JP	Yeleti Dhanayya	23,375	31.2	▲4.9
INC	Kondapalli Krishnamurthy (incumbent)	5,753	7.7	▼61.17
Republican Party Of India (Khobragade)	Bedampudi Israel	1,517	2.0	
Independent	Gudala Nagaraju	688	0.9	
Majority		20,220	26.5	▼15.42
Turnout		76,244	77.7	▲2.58
INC(I) gain from INC		Swing		

=== 1983 ===
1983 Andhra Pradesh Legislative Assembly election: Peddapuram
Party	Candidate	Votes	%	±%
TDP	Balasu Ramarao	48,509	63.9	
INC	Goli Ramarao	19,098	25.2	▼33
Independent	Malakala Pallama Raju	8,332	11	
Majority		29,411	38.3	▲11.8
Turnout		76,863	73.6	▼4.1
TDP gain from INC(I)		Swing		

=== 1985 ===
1985 Andhra Pradesh Legislative Assembly election: Peddapuram
Party	Candidate	Votes	%	±%
TDP	Balasu Ramarao	45,647	62.7	▼1.2
INC	Durvasula Satyanarayanamurty	25,272	34.7	▲9.5
Independent	Reddi Rap	487	0.7	
Independent	Bala Apparao	452	0.6	
Independent	Thotakura Ramanna	303	0.4	
Independent	Dimmala Nageswararao	175	0.2	
Independent	Gudala Nagaraju	174	0.2	▼0.3
Independent	Pallela Narayanamurty	160	0.2	
Majority		20,375	27.6	▼10.7
Turnout		73,768	66	▼7.6
TDP hold		Swing		

=== 1989 ===
1989 Andhra Pradesh Legislative Assembly election: Peddapuram
Party	Candidate	Votes	%	±%
INC	Pantham Padmanabham	56,237	58.5	▲23.8
TDP	Boddu Bhaskara Rama Rao	38,348	39.9	▼22.8
Independent	Ismail Mohammed	548	0.6	
Independent	Gudala Nagaraju	497	0.5	▲0.2
Independent	Kothim Rao	319	0.3	
Independent	Korukonda Kumari	196	0.2	
Majority		17,889	18	▼9.6
Turnout		99,123	76.7	▲10.7
INC gain from TDP		Swing		

=== 1994 ===
1994 Andhra Pradesh Legislative Assembly election: Peddapuram
Party	Candidate	Votes	%	±%
TDP	Boddu Rao	55,148	54.8	▲14.9
INC	Pantham Padmanabham	42,690	42.4	▼16.1
Independent	Padma Vasireddi	937	0.9	
BSP	Haranadh Raja Dunna	709	0.7	
BJP	Marina Rambabu	547	0.5	
Independent	Miriyala Narayana	175	0.2	
Independent	Gudala Nagaraju	174	0.2	▼0.3
Independent	Mattapalli Sanjeevarao	160	0.2	
Independent	Tumpala Ramalakshmi	99	0.1	
Independent	Veera Korukonda	80	0.1	
Majority		12,458	12.2	▼5.8
Turnout		102,478	75.8	▼0.9
TDP gain from INC		Swing		

=== 1999 ===
1999 Andhra Pradesh Legislative Assembly election: Peddapuram
Party	Candidate	Votes	%	±%
TDP	Boddu Rao	55,878	52.2	▼2.6
INC	Mohan Gandhi	50,572	47.3	▲4.9
Ajeya Bharat Party	A.A.V.V.Ramakrishna	324	0.3	
Independent	Duddumpudi Satyanarayana	241	0.2	
Majority		5,306	4.9	▼7.3
Turnout		109,157	72.0	▼3.8
TDP hold		Swing		

=== 2004 ===
2004 Andhra Pradesh Legislative Assembly election: Peddapuram
Party	Candidate	Votes	%	±%
INC	Thota Gopal Krishna	56,579	53.57	+6.31
TDP	Boddu Bhaskara Rama Rao	45,995	43.55	
Majority		10,584	10.02	
Turnout		105,609	72.77	+2.20
INC gain from TDP		Swing		

=== 2009 ===
2009 Andhra Pradesh Legislative Assembly election: Peddapuram
Party	Candidate	Votes	%	±%
PRP	Pantam Gandhi Mohan	46,211	34.17	
TDP	Boddu Bhaskara Rama Rao	43,155	31.91	
INC	Thota Gopala Krishna	36,519	27.00	
BJP	Yarlagadda Ramkumar	3188	2.35	
Majority		3,056	2.26	
Turnout		135,244	75.02	+2.25
PRP gain from INC		Swing		

=== 2014 ===
2014 Andhra Pradesh Legislative Assembly election: Peddapuram
Party	Candidate	Votes	%	±%
TDP	Nimmakayala Chinarajappa	75,914	50.49	
YSRCP	Thota Subbarao Naidu	65,251	43.40	
Majority		10,663	7.09	
Turnout		150,357	77.14	+2.12
TDP gain from PRP		Swing		

=== 2019 ===
2019 Andhra Pradesh Legislative Assembly election: Peddapuram
Party	Candidate	Votes	%	±%
TDP	Nimmakayala Chinarajappa	67,393	41.36	
YSRCP	Thota Vani	63,366	38.89	
JSP	Tummala Ramaswamy (Babu)	25,816	15.85	
BJP	Yarlagadda Ramkumar	1550		
Majority		4,027	2.47	
Turnout				
TDP hold		Swing		

=== 2024 ===
2024 Andhra Pradesh Legislative Assembly election: Peddapuram
Party	Candidate	Votes	%	±%
TDP	Nimmakayala Chinarajappa	105,685	59.09	
YSRCP	Davuluri Dorababu	65,234	36.47	
INC	Dorababu Tummala	2,168	1.21	
NOTA	None Of The Above	2,020	1.13	
Majority		40,451	22.61	
Turnout		1,78,849		
TDP hold		Swing		

== See also ==
- List of constituencies of the Andhra Pradesh Legislative Assembly
