= Parvatha Purnachandra Prasad =

Indian politician

Parvatha Sri Purnachandra Prasad
- Born: 1964 (age 61–62); Sankhavaram
- Occupation: Politician
- Political party: YSR Congress Party
- Spouse: Sathyaveni

Parvatha Sri Purnachandra Prasad (born 14 August 1964) is an Indian politician from Andhra Pradesh. He won the 2019 Andhra Pradesh Legislative Assembly Election on YSR Congress Party ticket from Prathipadu Constituency in East Godavari district. He was denied a ticket for the 2024 Assembly election but remained loyal to YSRCP.

== Early life and education ==
Prasad hails from an agricultural family in Sankhavaram, East Godavari district. His father Kondal Rao was a farmer. He did his schooling from Zilla Parishad High School, Sankhavaram and later completed his intermediate (plus two). He now runs a business. He married Sathyaveni and has two daughters Nandhini and Teena.

== Career ==
Prasad started his political journey in 1989 with the Telugu Desam Party and later joined Indian National Congress. He was the Vice-Sarpanch of Sankhavaram village. He also served as a Central Bank Director and a member of the Annavaram temple's trust board.

Representing YSR Congress Party, he won the 2019 Andhra Pradesh Legislative Assembly Election defeating Varupula Raja of Telugu Desam Party by a margin of 4,666 votes. Many YSRCP cadre and party leaders opposed the renomination of Prasad for the 2024 election. For a long time, his family was one of the three families that dominated the local politics.
