= Thota Narasimham =

Indian politician

Member of Parliament, Lok Sabha
- In office 16 May 2014 – 23 May 2019
- Preceded by: M. M. Pallam Raju
- Succeeded by: Vanga Geetha
- Constituency: Kakinada

Minister of Animal Husbandry, Fisheries and Dairy Development Government of Andhra Pradesh
- In office 25 November 2010 – 21 February 2014
- Governor: E. S. L. Narasimhan
- Chief Minister: Kiran Kumar Reddy
- Preceded by: Kolusu Parthasarathy
- Succeeded by: President's Rule

Member of Legislative Assembly Andhra Pradesh
- In office 2004–2014
- Preceded by: Jyothula Nehru
- Succeeded by: Jyothula Nehru
- Constituency: Jaggampeta

Personal details
- Born: 6 July 1962 (age 64) Veeravaram, Kirlampudi Mandal, East Godavari district, Andhra Pradesh
- Party: YSR Congress Party
- Spouse: Smt. Thota Vani
- Children: 1 daughter 1 son
- Education: Institute of Cost and Works Accountants of India

Thota Narasimham is an Indian politician and a member of parliament from Kakinada, Andhra Pradesh. He won the 2014 Indian general election on a Telugu Desam Party ticket from Kakinada Lok Sabha seat, defeating his young rival Chalamalasetty Sunil of the YSRC.

== Personal life ==
Thota Narasimham was born on 6 July 1962, to Shri Thota Varahalayya and Smt. Thota Padmakshamma. He married Smt. Thota Vani on 25 November 1986 and they have one daughter and a son.

== Political career ==
Thota Narasimham was a member, Andhra Pradesh Legislative Assembly for two terms i.e. 2004–2009 and 2009–2014. Between 2010–2014 he was the Cabinet Minister, Govt. of Andhra Pradesh. He was elected to 16th Lok Sabha. At the Lok Sabha he is a member of the Business Advisory Committee; Standing Committee on Railways; General Purposes Committee; Consultative Committee, Ministry of Petroleum and Natural Gas and he is the Leader, Telugu Desam Party in Lok Sabha.

Party political offices
Preceded by Nama Nageswara Rao	Leader of the Telugu Desam Party in the 16th Lok Sabha; 2014–2019	Succeeded by Rammohan Naidu Kinjarapu
