= Pendem Dorababu =

Indian politician

Member of Legislative Assembly Andhra Pradesh
- In office 23 May 2019 – 3 June 2024
- Preceded by: SVSN Varma
- Succeeded by: Pawan Kalyan
- Constituency: Pithapuram (Assembly constituency)
- In office 11 May 2004 – 16 May 2009
- Preceded by: Veera Bhadra Rao Sangisetti
- Succeeded by: Vanga Geetha
- Constituency: Pithapuram (Assembly constituency)

Personal details
- Born: 12 January 1959 (age 67)
- Party: Janasena Party (2025–present)
- Other political affiliations: YSR Congress Party (2012–2024); Indian National Congress; Bharatiya Janata Party

Pendem Dorababu is an Indian politician. He is known for his defection from the YSR Congress Party whom he previously represented in the Legislative Assembly. As of March 2025, Dorababu is a member of the Janasena Party.

== Background ==
Dorababu was a member of the Andhra Pradesh Legislative Assembly from the Pithapuram constituency on a Bharatiya Janata Party ticket from 2004 to 2009. He later joined the YSR Congress Party in 2012 and contested the 2014 Andhra Pradesh Assembly elections from Pithapuram constituency but lost. Notably, he was one of the close associates of Late Mr. Y. S. Rajasekhar Reddy.

Dorababu served as a Member of the Legislative Assembly from the Pithapuram constituency in East Godavari district on a YSR Congress Party ticket from 23 May 2019 to 3 June 2024. Dorababu's defection from the YSR Congress Party had been rumored as early as 2022. In August 2024, Dorababu began to distance himself from the YSR Congress Party.

In early March 2025, Dorababu formally joined the Janasena Party.
