= Prathipadu, Kakinada Assembly constituency =

Constituency of the Andhra Pradesh Legislative Assembly, India

Coordinates: 17.23°N 82.19°E

Prathipadu
- Constituency No. 36 for the Andhra Pradesh Legislative Assembly
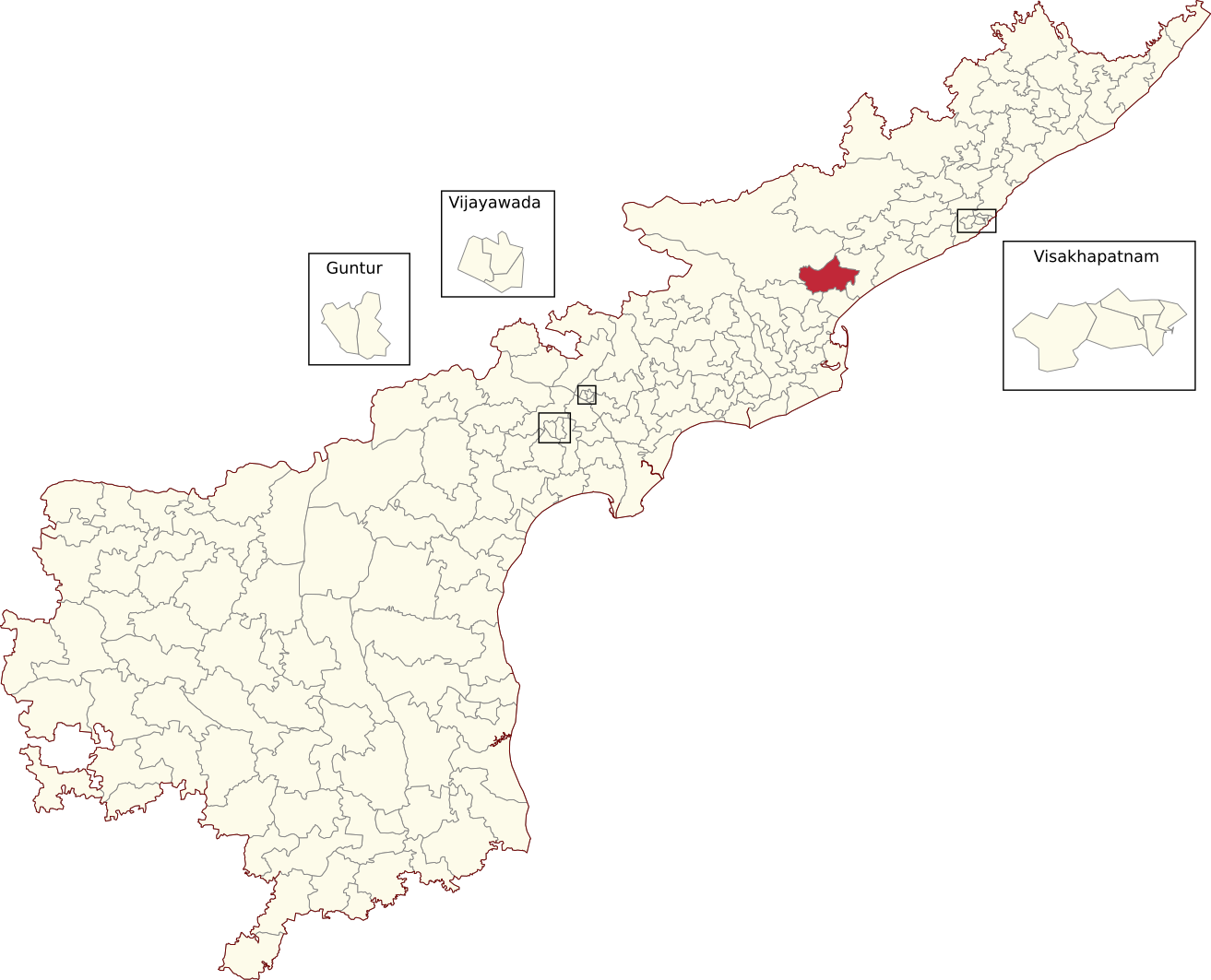
- Location of Prathipadu Assembly constituency within Andhra Pradesh

Constituency details
- Country: India
- Region: South India
- State: Andhra Pradesh
- District: Kakinada
- Lok Sabha constituency: Kakinada
- Established: 1951
- Total electors: 202,743
- Reservation: None

Member of Legislative Assembly
- 16th Andhra Pradesh Legislative Assembly
- Incumbent Varupula Satyaprabha
- Party: TDP
- Alliance: NDA
- Elected year: 2024

Prathipadu Assembly constituency is a constituency in Kakinada district of Andhra Pradesh that elects representatives to the Andhra Pradesh Legislative Assembly in India. It is one of the seven assembly segments of Kakinada Lok Sabha constituency.

Varupula Satyaprabha is the current MLA of the constituency, having won the 2024 Andhra Pradesh Legislative Assembly election from Telugu Desam Party. As of 2019, there are a total of 202,743 electors in the constituency. The constituency was established in 1951, as per the Delimitation Orders (1951).

== Mandals ==
The four mandals that form the assembly constituency are:

Mandal
Sankhavaram
Prathipadu
Yeleswaram
Rowthulapudi

== Members of the Legislative Assembly ==
Year	Member	Political party
1955	Parvata Gurraju	Indian National Congress
1962	Mudragada Veeraraghavarao	Independent
1967	Mudragada Veeraraghavarao	Independent
1972	Varupula Jogiraju	Indian National Congress
1978	Mudragada Padmanabham	Janata Party
1983	Mudragada Padmanabham	Telugu Desam Party
1985	Mudragada Padmanabham	Telugu Desam Party
1989	Mudragada Padmanabham	Indian National Congress
1994	Parvatha Subbarao	Telugu Desam Party
1999	Parvatha Bapanamma	Telugu Desam Party
2004	Varupula Subbarao	Indian National Congress
2009	Parvatha Sri Satyanarayana Murthy	Telugu Desam Party
2014	Varupula Subbarao	YSR Congress Party
2019	Parvatha Purnachandra Prasad	YSR Congress Party
2024	Varupula Satyaprabha	Telugu Desam Party

== Election results ==
=== 1955 ===
1955 Andhra Pradesh Legislative Assembly election: Prathipadu
Party	Candidate	Votes	%	±%
INC	Parvata Gurraju	17,833		
Independent	Yenumula Venkannadora	11,939		
INC gain from Independent		Swing		

=== 1962 ===
1962 Andhra Pradesh Legislative Assembly election: Prathipadu
Party	Candidate	Votes	%	±%
Independent	Mudragada Veeraraghavarao	34,294		
INC	Parvatha Gurraju	20,918		
Independent gain from INC		Swing		

=== 1967 ===
1967 Andhra Pradesh Legislative Assembly election: Prathipadu
Party	Candidate	Votes	%	±%
Independent	Mudragada Veeraraghavarao	35,239		
INC	Varupula Jogiraju	22,833		
Independent gain from INC		Swing		

=== 1972 ===
1972 Andhra Pradesh Legislative Assembly election: Prathipadu
Party	Candidate	Votes	%	±%
INC	Jogiraju Varupula	34,533		
Independent	Veeraraghavarao Mudragada	31,228		
INC gain from Independent		Swing		

=== 1983 ===
1983 Andhra Pradesh Legislative Assembly election: Prathipadu
Party	Candidate	Votes	%	±%
TDP	Mudragada Padma Nabham	45,976		
INC	Varupula Subbarao	31,634		
TDP gain from INC		Swing		

=== 1985 ===
1985 Andhra Pradesh Legislative Assembly election: Prathipadu
Party	Candidate	Votes	%	±%
TDP	Mudrangada Padmanabham	54,354		
INC	Sampara Sundara Rama Kumar	13025		
TDP gain from INC		Swing		

=== 1989 ===
1989 Andhra Pradesh Legislative Assembly election: Prathipadu
Party	Candidate	Votes	%	±%
INC	Mudragada Padmanabham	58,567		
TDP	Varupula Subbarao	45,725		
INC gain from TDP		Swing		

=== 1994 ===
1994 Andhra Pradesh Legislative Assembly election: Prathipadu
Party	Candidate	Votes	%	±%
TDP	Parvatha Subbarao	68,066		
INC	Mudragada Padmanabham	46429		
TDP gain from INC		Swing		

=== 1999 ===
1999 Andhra Pradesh Legislative Assembly election: Prathipadu
Party	Candidate	Votes	%	±%
TDP	Parvatha Bapanamma	65,685		
INC	Varupula Subbarao	46159		
TDP hold		Swing		

=== 2004 ===
2004 Andhra Pradesh Legislative Assembly election: Prathipadu
Party	Candidate	Votes	%	±%
INC	Varupula Subbarao	70,962	54.41	+17.80
TDP	Parvatha Bapanamma	52,594	40.33	−11.76
Majority		18,368	14.08	
Turnout		130,415	74.69	+1.89
INC gain from TDP		Swing		

=== 2009 ===
2009 Andhra Pradesh Legislative Assembly election: Prathipadu
Party	Candidate	Votes	%	±%
TDP	Parvatha Srisatyanarayana Murthy	46,925	35.32	−5.01
INC	Varupula Subbarao	43,639	32.84	−19.25
PRP	Thota Venkataswamy Naidu	30,544	22.99	
Majority		3,286	2.47	
Turnout		132,980	75.13	+0.44
TDP gain from INC		Swing		

=== 2014 ===
2014 Andhra Pradesh Legislative Assembly election: Prathipadu
Party	Candidate	Votes	%	±%
YSRCP	Varupula Subbarao	63,693	43.01	
TDP	Parvatha Sri Satyanarayanamurthy	60,280	40.71	
Majority		3,413	2.30	
Turnout		148,075	80.13	+5.00
YSRCP gain from TDP		Swing		

=== 2019 ===
2019 Andhra Pradesh Legislative Assembly election: Prathipadu
Party	Candidate	Votes	%	±%
YSRCP	Parvatha Purnachandra Prasad	90,004	46.77	
TDP	Varupula Raja	71,908	43.92	
JSP	Varupula Thammaiah Babu	6,907	4.22	
Majority		4,666		
Turnout				
YSRCP hold		Swing		

=== 2024 ===
2024 Andhra Pradesh Legislative Assembly election: Prathipadu
Party	Candidate	Votes	%	±%
TDP	Varapula Sathyaprabha	103,002	58.36	
YSRCP	Varapula Subbarao	64,234	36.4	
INC	N V V Satyanarayana	1,354	0.77	
NOTA	None Of The Above	2,582	1.46	
Majority		38,768	21.96	
Turnout		1,76,485		
TDP gain from YSRCP		Swing		
