= Vanga Geetha =

Indian politician (born 1964)

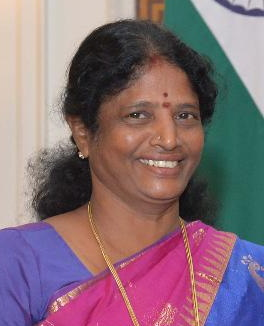
- Vanga Geetha in 2019

Member of Parliament, Lok Sabha
- In office 17 June 2019 – 4 June 2024
- Preceded by: Thota Narasimham
- Succeeded by: Tangella Uday Srinivas
- Constituency: Kakinada

Member of Legislative Assembly, Andhra Pradesh
- In office 16 May 2009 – 15 May 2014
- Preceded by: Pendem Dorababu
- Succeeded by: S. V. S. N. Varma
- Constituency: Pithapuram

Member of Parliament, Rajya Sabha
- In office 3 April 2000 – 2 April 2006
- Chairman: Krishan Kant (2000-2002); Bhairon Singh Shekhawat (2002-2006)
- Leader of the House: Jaswant Singh (2000-2004); Manmohan Singh (2004-2006)
- Preceded by: Mohan Babu
- Succeeded by: M. V. Mysura Reddy
- Constituency: Andhra Pradesh

Chairman of East Godavari Zilla Praja Parishad
- In office 1995–2000
- Succeeded by: D Janardhana Rao

Personal details
- Born: 1 March 1964 (age 62) Kakinada, East Godavari district, Andhra Pradesh, India (now Kakinada district, Andhra Pradesh, India)
- Party: YSR Congress Party (2019-present)
- Other political affiliations: Indian National Congress (2011-2014); Praja Rajyam Party (2008-2011); Telugu Desam Party (1983-2008)
- Spouse: Kasi Viswanatham
- Parents: P. V. S. Prakash Rao (father); P. Bramaramba (mother)
- Education: ASD Govt Degree College for Women, Kakinada; MA (Political Science, Public Administration and Sociology) from Andhra University; MSc Psychology from University of Madras; Law from GSKM Law College, Rajamundry of Andhra University; Master of Laws from University of Nagapur
- Profession: Advocate; Politician

Vanga Geetha (born 1 March 1964) is an Indian politician from Andhra Pradesh. She is a former Member of Parliament, Lok Sabha, representing Kakinada parliament constituency. She is a member of the YSR Congress Party. She was earlier a member of the Rajya Sabha representing the Telugu Desam Party.

== Early life and education ==
She was born to P. V. S. Prakash Rao and P. Bramaramba in Kakinada, East Godavari district (now Kakinada district), Andhra Pradesh. She married Vanga Kasi Viswanath. She completed her B.L from GSK College, Andhra University, and her Master of Law from the Universality of Nagpur. She worked as an advocate. She also holds post graduate degrees in Political Science and Public Administration, and Psychology.

== Political career ==
She started her political journey with the Telugu Desam Party (TDP) in 1993. Earlier from 1989-1993, she served as Regional Chairperson of Women and Child Welfare department for East Godavari, Visakhapatnam, Vizianagaram and Srikakulam Districts.[clarification needed]

She contested from the Pithapuram constituency as an independent but lost. Between1995-2000, she served as chairperson of Zilla Parishad from East Godavari District. In 1997, she became the Vice President of the State Telugu Desam Party.[clarification needed]

From 2000-2006, she was a Member of Rajya Sabha representing Andhra Pradesh in the upper house of the Indian Parliament representing Telugu Desam Party. From 2000 to 2006, she served as a member on different committees like Transport and Tourism, Committee on Rules and the Consultative Committee on Human Resource Development.[clarification needed]

She joined the Praja Rajyam Party and won the 2009 Andhra Pradesh Legislative Assembly election from Pithapuram Constituency.[clarification needed]

Later, when PRP merged in the Congress, she became a member of the Indian National Congress.

In March 2019, she joined YSR Congress Party and became an MP winning the 2019 Indian General election from Kakinada on YSR Congress Party ticket.
