= M. S. Sanjeevi Rao =

Indian politician (1929–2014)

Member of Parliament, Lok Sabha
- In office 1971–1984
- Preceded by: Mosalikanti Thirumala Rao
- Succeeded by: Gopal Krishna Thota
- Constituency: Kakinada, Andhra Pradesh

Personal details
- Born: 3 August 1929 Bhiminupatnam, Visakhapatnam District, Madras Presidency, British India(Now in Andhra Pradesh, India)
- Died: 3 September 2014 (aged 85) Kakinada
- Party: Indian National Congress
- Children: 2, including M. M. Pallam Raju
- Education: College of Engineering, Guindy, Imperial College of Science and Technology

M. S. Sanjeevi Rao (1929–2014) was an Indian politician who served as a Union Minister and chairman of India's first electronics commission. He is referred to as "India’s father of electronics". He was elected to the Lok Sabha from the Kakinada in Andhra Pradesh from the Congress Party.

== Early life ==
M. S. Sanjeevi Rao was born in a Kapu family in 1929. His father was an Indian independence activist. He studied electronics and telecommunications at the Imperial College London.

== Career ==
After returning to India, he started working at the All India Radio. Later, he joined the Defence Research and Development Organisation. He was posted at the Electronic and Radar Development Establishment, Bengaluru, and then at the Defence Research Electronics Laboratory, Hyderabad.

=== Political career ===
Rao entered politics after his father's death. He was elected to the Lok Sabha, and later appointed minister in Indira Gandhi's cabinet.

== Personal life ==
Rao had two children, including M. M. Pallam Raju.
