= Jyothula Chantibabu =

Indian politician (born 1978)

Member of Legislative Assembly, Andhra Pradesh
- In office 2019–2024
- Preceded by: Jyothula Nehru
- Succeeded by: Jyothula Nehru
- Constituency: Jaggampeta

Personal details
- Born: 1978 (age 47–48) Jaggampeta
- Party: YSR Congress Party
- Education: Andhra University
- Occupation: Politician

Jyothula Chantibabu (born 1978) is an Indian politician from Andhra Pradesh. He won the 2019 Andhra Pradesh Legislative Assembly election on YSR Congress Party ticket from Jaggampeta Constituency in East Godavari district. He was denied a ticket by YSRCP for the 2024 Andhra Pradesh Assembly Election.

== Early life and education ==
Babu was born in Irripaka Village in Jaggampeta, East Godavari district. His father Rama Swamy is a farmer. He studied political science and completed his post-graduation from Andhra University in 1998.

== Career ==
Babu started his political journey in Telugu Desam Party and in 2009, he was incharge of TDP in his district. Later, he shifted to YSR Congress Party. In 2019, he contested the Jaggampeta Assembly Constituency on YSR Congress Party ticket and won the 2019 Andhra Pradesh Legislative Assembly election. He defeated Jyothula Nehru of Telugu Desam Party by 23, 365 votes. In 2014, he lost to Jyothula Nehru of YSRCP by a margin of 15,932. He also lost in the 2009 Andhra Pradesh Legislative Assembly Election but polled about 33,000 votes. YSRCP's regional coordinator Pilli Subhash Chandra Bose made it clear to Babu that his name may not be considered for the Jaggampeta seat for the 2024 election due to the internal survey. Babu met Pawan Kalyan of PRP in December 2023 to trigger rumours of his exit from YSRCP.
