= S. V. S. N. Varma =

Indian politician

Member of Legislative Assembly, Andhra Pradesh
- In office 2 June 2014 – 24 May 2019
- Preceded by: Vanga Geetha
- Succeeded by: Dorababu Pendem
- Constituency: Pithapuram

Personal details
- Party: Telugu Desam Party

Srivatsavai Satyanarayana Varma, popularly known as S. V. S. N. Varma, is an Indian politician from the state of Andhra Pradesh. He is a member of the Telugu Desam Party (TDP). Varma was elected as the member of the Andhra Pradesh Legislative Assembly from the Pithapuram Assembly constituency in East Godavari district as an independent in 2014.

== Political career ==
Varma embarked on his political journey with the TDP. During the 2009 Assembly elections, he entered the fray as an MLA candidate representing the party in Pithapuram. However, he faced defeat at the hands of Vanga Geetha from the Praja Rajyam Party.

In the subsequent 2014 elections, Varma chose to contest as an independent MLA candidate after being denied a ticket by the TDP. Despite this setback, Varma emerged victorious, defeating YSRCP’s Pendem Dorababu, and securing his first term as an MLA with a 57 percent vote share.

In the 2019 Assembly elections, Varma once again vied for an MLA seat from Pithapuram. This time, the TDP extended him a ticket. Varma garnered 36.67 percent of the votes, while Dorababu secured 44.71 percent of the vote share.

=== Electoral performance ===
S.No	Year	Election	Constituency	Party	Votes	Vote %	Margin	Result
1	2009	Andhra Pradesh Legislative Assembly	Pithapuram	TDP	45,587	30.50	1,036	Lost
2	2014	Andhra Pradesh Legislative Assembly	Pithapuram	Independent	97,511	57.59	+ 47,080	Won
3	2019	Andhra Pradesh Legislative Assembly	Pithapuram	TDP	68,467	36.68	14,992	Lost
