= Tangella Uday Srinivas =

Indian politician and businessman

Member of Parliament, Lok Sabha
- Incumbent
- Assumed office 4 June 2024
- Preceded by: Vanga Geetha
- Constituency: Kakinada Lok Sabha constituency

Personal details
- Born: 13 May 1985 (age 40)
- Party: Janasena Party
- Occupation: Politician
- Profession: Founder of Tea Time & Kanchi Cafe

Tangella Uday Srinivas is an Indian politician and the elected candidate for Lok Sabha from Kakinada Lok Sabha constituency.since 2024 He is a member of the Jana Sena Party.

== See also ==
- 18th Lok Sabha
