= Kurada =

- Village
- Interactive map of Kurada
- Location in Andhra Pradesh, India Kurada (India)
- Coordinates: 16.886319°N 82.118336°E
- Country: India
- State: Andhra Pradesh
- Region: Karapa
- District: East Godavari district
- Elevation: 19 m (62 ft)

Population (2011)
  - Total: 3,559

Languages
  - Official: Telugu
- Time zone: UTC+5:30 (IST)
- PIN: 533 xxx

Kurada is situated in East Godavari district in Karapa, in Andhra Pradesh State.
