= Kurasala Kannababu =

Indian politician

Minister of Agriculture, Cooperation & Marketing Government of Andhra Pradesh
- In office 8 June 2019 – 7 April 2022
- Governor: E. S. L. Narasimhan; Biswabhusan Harichandan
- Chief Minister: Y. S. Jagan Mohan Reddy
- Preceded by: Somireddy Chandra Mohan Reddy
- Succeeded by: Kakani Govardhan Reddy

Member of Legislative Assembly Andhra Pradesh
- In office 23 May 2019 – 4 June 2024
- Preceded by: Anantha Lakshmi Pilli
- Succeeded by: Pantham Venkateswara Rao (Nanaji)
- Constituency: Kakinada Rural
- In office 2009–2014
- Preceded by: constituency established
- Succeeded by: Anantha Lakshmi Pilli
- Constituency: Kakinada Rural

Personal details
- Party: YSR Congress Party
- Other political affiliations: Indian National Congress; Praja Rajyam Party
- Spouse: Kurasala Srividya
- Parent: Kurasala Satyannarayana (father)

Kurasala Kannababu is an Indian politician, served as the Minister of Agriculture and Cooperation in Y. S. Jaganmohan Reddy Ministry of the Indian state of Andhra Pradesh.

He was elected as Member of legislative assembly from Kakinada Rural in 2019 Andhra Pradesh Legislative Assembly Election. He was elected as an MLA in 2009 from Praja Rajyam Party and he joined Indian National Congress in 2012 during the merger of Praja Rajyam Party with Indian National Congress. He quit Indian National Congress in 2014 and contested as an Independent in 2014 and joined YSR Congress Party in 2016.

He was born in 1970 to K.Satyannarayana in Ramanayyapeta, Kakinada, Andhra Pradesh.

He completed B.Com. Kannababu has completed MA (Sociology) from Kakatiya University & M.A.(Public Administration) from Dr. B.R. Ambedkar Open University, Hyderabad. He has worked as a Journalist.
