= Sankhavaram =

- village
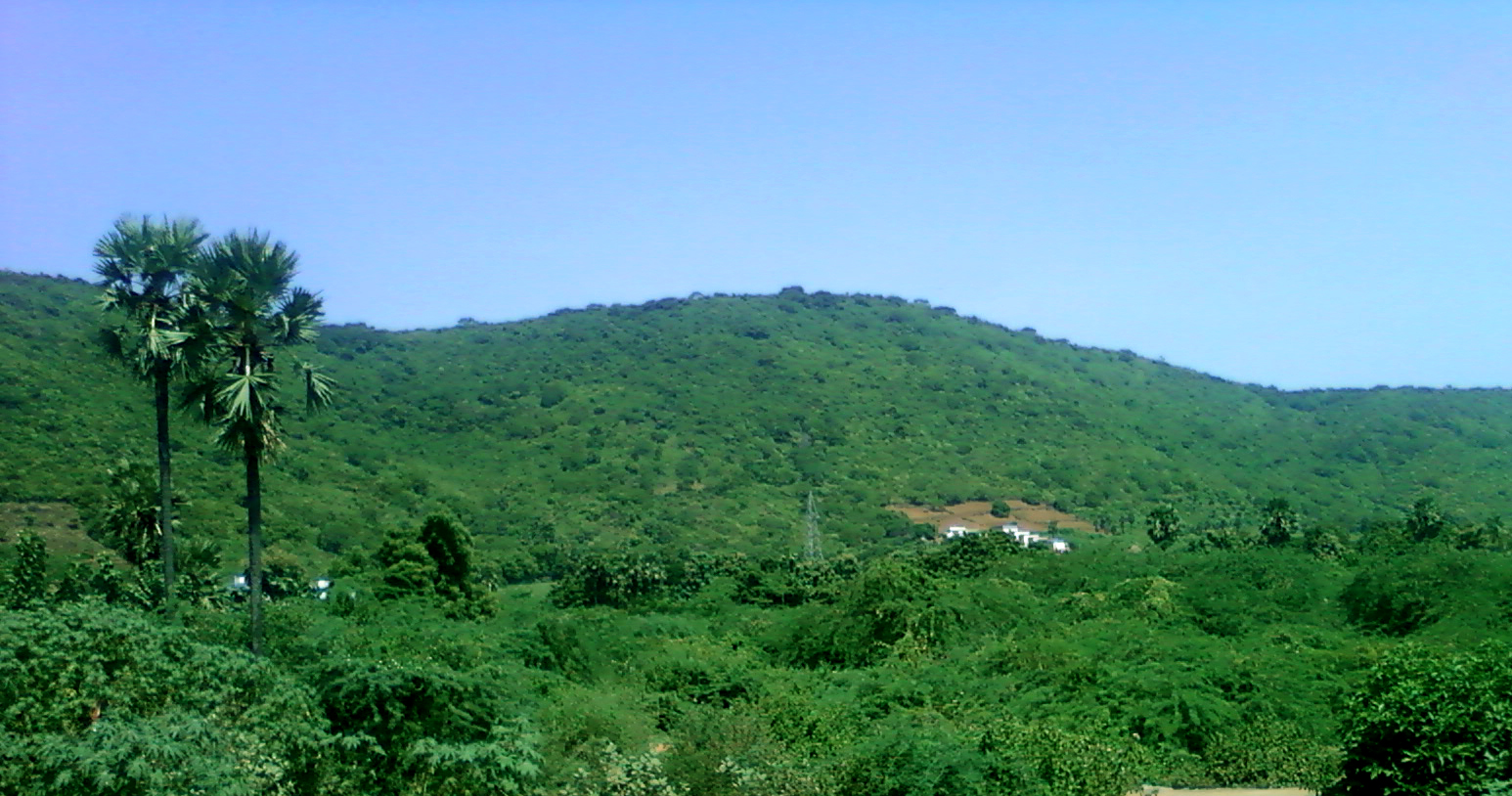
- Landscape view at Tuni-Sankhavaram Road
- Interactive map of Sankhavaram
- Location in Andhra Pradesh, India Sankhavaram (India)
- Coordinates: 17°18′N 82°24′E
- Country: India
- State: Andhra Pradesh
- District: Kakinada
- Founder: chandu vara
- Talukas: Sankhavaram

Population (2011)
  - Total: 11,039

Languages
  - Official: Telugu
- Time zone: UTC+5:30 (IST)
- PIN: 533446
- Telephone code: 08868
- Vehicle Registration: AP05 (Former); AP39 (from 30 January 2019)

Sankhavaram is a village in Kakinada district in the state of Andhra Pradesh in India.
