= Varupula Satyaprabha =

Indian politician

Member of the Andhra Pradesh Legislative Assembly
- Incumbent
- Assumed office 2024
- Preceded by: Parvatha Purnachandra Prasad
- Constituency: Prathipadu, Kakinada

Personal details
- Born: 1979 (age 46–47)
- Party: Telugu Desam Party

Varupula Satyaprabha (born 1979) is an Indian politician from Andhra Pradesh. She is a member of the Andhra Pradesh Legislative Assembly representing the Telugu Desam Party from Prathipadu, Kakinada Assembly Constituency in Kakinada district. She won the 2024 Andhra Pradesh Legislative Assembly election.

== Early life and education ==
Satyaprabha married Varupula Jogiraju Raja. After he died, TDP gave the seat to Satya Prabha. She is a post graduate and did her MBA at Andhra University, Visakhapatnam in 2006. She runs her own business and declared assets worth Rs.2 crore in the affidavit to the Election Commission of India.

== Political career ==
Satyaprabha became the first woman MLA to be elected from Prathipadu constituency. After her husband Jogiraju Raja died, she entered the fray and was elected in the 2024 Andhra Pradesh Legislative Assembly election as the Telugu Desam Party candidate from Prathipadu Assembly Constituency. She polled 103,002 votes with a vote share of 58.36 per cent, and defeated her nearest rival and two time former MLA, Varupula Subbarao of the YSR Congress Party, by a margin of 38,768 votes. After losing twice in the previous elections, the Telugu Desam Party regained the seat with Satyaprabha garnering the TDP wave and the sympathy vote.

In September 2024, after getting elected as an MLA, she made surprise visits to Annavaram temple and conducted official checks. In May 2025, after the conclusion of a 90 day training programme, she distributed sewing machines worth Rs.25,000 each to women beneficiaries. She also promised to take up development works to improve the facilities for farmers and distributed farming tools to them in Yeleswaram mandal of her constituency.
