= Pantham Venkateswara Rao =

Indian politician

Member of the Andhra Pradesh Legislative Assembly
- Incumbent
- Assumed office 2024
- Preceded by: Kurasala Kannababu
- Constituency: Kakinada Rural

Personal details
- Party: Jana Sena Party

Pantham Venkateswara Rao, popularly known as Pantham Nanaji, is an Indian politician from Andhra Pradesh. He is a member of Jana Sena Party. He has been elected as the Member of the Legislative Assembly (MLA) representing the Kakinada Rural Assembly constituency in 2024 Andhra Pradesh Legislative Assembly elections.
