= Nadakuduru =

- Big Village
- Interactive map of Nadakuduru
- Location in Andhra Pradesh, India Nadakuduru (India)
- Coordinates: 16.916407°N 82.2015523°E
- Country: India
- State: Andhra Pradesh
- Region: Kakinada district
- District: Kakinada district

Area
  - Total: 4.03 km^{2} (1.56 sq mi)

Population (2011)
  - Total: 6,266
  - Density: 1,550/km^{2} (4,030/sq mi)

Languages
  - Official: Telugu
- Time zone: UTC+5:30 (IST)
- PIN: 533016

Nadakuduru is a village and suburb situated in Kakinada district near Kakinada town, in Andhra Pradesh State.

== Geography ==
It is located on the West Face of Bay of Bengal.

== Demographics ==
Total population of Nadakuduru is 6266. There are 3,148 males and 3,118 females in the town, with a total of 1,524 households.
