= Gorripudi =

- Village
- Interactive map of Gorripudi
- Location in Andhra Pradesh, India Gorripudi (India)
- Coordinates: 16.869482°N 82.194593°E
- Country: India
- State: Andhra Pradesh
- Region: Kakinada
- District: Kakinada district

Languages
  - Official: Telugu
- Time zone: UTC+5:30 (IST)
- PIN: 533468

Gorripudi is situated in Kakinada district in Kakinada, in Andhra Pradesh State.
