= Jyothula Nehru =

Indian politician from Andhra Pradesh

Member of the Andhra Pradesh Legislative Assembly
- Incumbent
- Assumed office 2024
- Preceded by: Jyothula Chantibabu
- Constituency: Jaggampeta
- In office 2014–2019
- Preceded by: Thota Narasimham
- Succeeded by: Jyothula Chantibabu
- Constituency: Jaggampeta
- In office 1994–2004
- Preceded by: Thota Venkata Chalam
- Succeeded by: Thota Narasimham
- Constituency: Jaggampeta

Personal details
- Party: Telugu Desam Party
- Other political affiliations: YSR Congress Party; Praja Rajyam Party

Jyothula Venkata Apparao, commonly known as Jyothula Nehru, is an Indian politician from Andhra Pradesh. He is a member of the Telugu Desam Party.

== Political career ==
Apparao was first elected as a Member of the Andhra Pradesh Legislative Assembly from the Jaggampeta Assembly constituency in the 1994 elections. He was re-elected from the same constituency in the 1999 elections. He later won the 2014 elections and 2024 elections, continuing to represent Jaggampeta in the Legislative Assembly.

== Electoral performance ==
2024 Andhra Pradesh Legislative Assembly election: Jaggampeta
Party	Candidate	Votes	%	±%
TDP	Jyothula Nehru	1,13,593	58.56	
YSRCP	Thota Narasimham	60,917	31.4%	
Independent	Patamsetti Surya Chandra	12,531	6.4%	
NOTA	None Of The Above	1,928	0.01%	
Majority		52,676	27.15%	
Turnout		1,93,979	83.65%	
TDP gain from YSRCP		Swing		

2019 Andhra Pradesh Legislative Assembly election: Jaggampeta
Party	Candidate	Votes	%	±%
YSRCP	Jyothula Chanti Babu	93,496	51.62%	
TDP	Jyothula Nehru	70,131	38.72%	
JSP	Patamsetti Suryachandra	10,649	5.88%	
Majority		23,365	12.9%	
Turnout		1,81,127	85.86%	
YSRCP hold		Swing		

2014 Andhra Pradesh Legislative Assembly election: Jaggampeta
Party	Candidate	Votes	%	±%
YSRCP	Jyothula Nehru	86,146	55.05	
TDP	Jyothula Chanti Babu	72,214	43.45	
Majority		15,932	9.58	
Turnout		166,213	83.59	+4.77
YSRCP gain from INC		Swing		

2009 Andhra Pradesh Legislative Assembly election: Jaggampeta
Party	Candidate	Votes	%	±%
INC	Thota Narasimham	51,184	34.84	
PRP	Jyothula Nehru	50,395	34.31	
TDP	Jyothula Chanti Babu	33,277	22.65	
Majority		789	0.53	
Turnout		146,893	78.82	−1.27
INC hold		Swing		
