= Valasapakala =

- Village
- Interactive map of Valasapakala
- Location in Andhra Pradesh, India Valasapakala (India)
- Coordinates: 16.997264°N 82.257039°E
- Country: India
- State: Andhra Pradesh
- Region: Kakinada
- District: Kakinada district

Languages
  - Official: Telugu
- Time zone: UTC+5:30 (IST)
- PIN: 533005

Valasapakala is situated in Kakinada district in Kakinada, in Andhra Pradesh State.
