= Pantam Gandhi Mohan =

Indian politician

Pantham Gandhi Mohan was a politician and member of the Indian National Congress. Mohan was a member of the Andhra Pradesh Legislative Assembly from the Peddapuram (Vidhan Sabha constituency) in East Godavari district through Chiranjeevi's Prajarayam Party. He served as a member of legislative assembly from 2009–2014. He has recently joined Y.S.Jagan's YSRCP.
