= Chelikani Venkata Rama Rao =

Member of Parliament
- Constituency: Kakinada constituency

Personal details
- Born: 15 July 1901 Kondevaram, East Godavari district
- Died: 25 September 1985 (aged 84) Ramachandrapuram
- Party: Communist Party of India
- Spouse: Dr. Ch. Kamalamma
- Children: 1 son Dr.Stalin

Dr. Chelikani Venkata Rama Rao (15 July 1901 – 25 September 1985) was a Communist leader and Member of Indian Parliament.

He was the son of Shri Narayana Swamy and born in Kondevaram, East Godavari district on 15 July 1901. He was educated at R. Ch. High School, Pithapuram and P. R. College, Kakinada. He graduated from Osmania Medical College, Hyderabad. He married Dr. Ch. Kamalamma in 1934. They had one son, Dr. Stalin.

He was elected to the 1st Lok Sabha from Kakinada (Lok Sabha constituency) in 1952 as a member of Communist Party of India.

He died on 25 September 1985 at Ramachandrapuram.
