= Karapa =

- village
- Interactive map of Karapa
- Location in Andhra Pradesh, India Karapa (India)
- Coordinates: 16.9000°N 82.1667°E
- Country: India
- State: Andhra Pradesh
- District: Kakinada
- Elevation: 3 m (9.8 ft)

Population
  - Total: 6,593

Languages
  - Official: Telugu
- Time zone: UTC+5:30 (IST)
- PIN: 533462
- Vehicle Registration: AP05 (Former); AP39 (from 30 January 2019)

Karapa is a village in Kakinada district in the state of Andhra Pradesh in India.

== Geography ==
Karapa has an average elevation of 3 meters (13 feet) above sea level.
