= Kirlampudi =

- Village
- Interactive map of Kirlampudi
- Location in Andhra Pradesh, India Kirlampudi (India)
- Coordinates: 17°11′31″N 82°10′57″E
- Country: India
- State: Andhra Pradesh
- District: Kakinada
- Talukas: Kirlampudi

Area
  - Total: 10.71 km^{2} (4.14 sq mi)

Population (2011)
  - Total: 9,609
  - Density: 897.2/km^{2} (2,324/sq mi)

Languages
  - Official: Telugu
- Time zone: UTC+5:30 (IST)
- PIN: 533431
- Telephone code: 08868
- Vehicle Registration: AP05 (Former); AP39 (from 30 January 2019)

Kirlampudi is a village in Kakinada district of the Indian state of Andhra Pradesh. It is located in Kirlampudi mandal of Peddapuram revenue division.
