= Coringa, Kakinada district =

Coringa Korangi
- Village
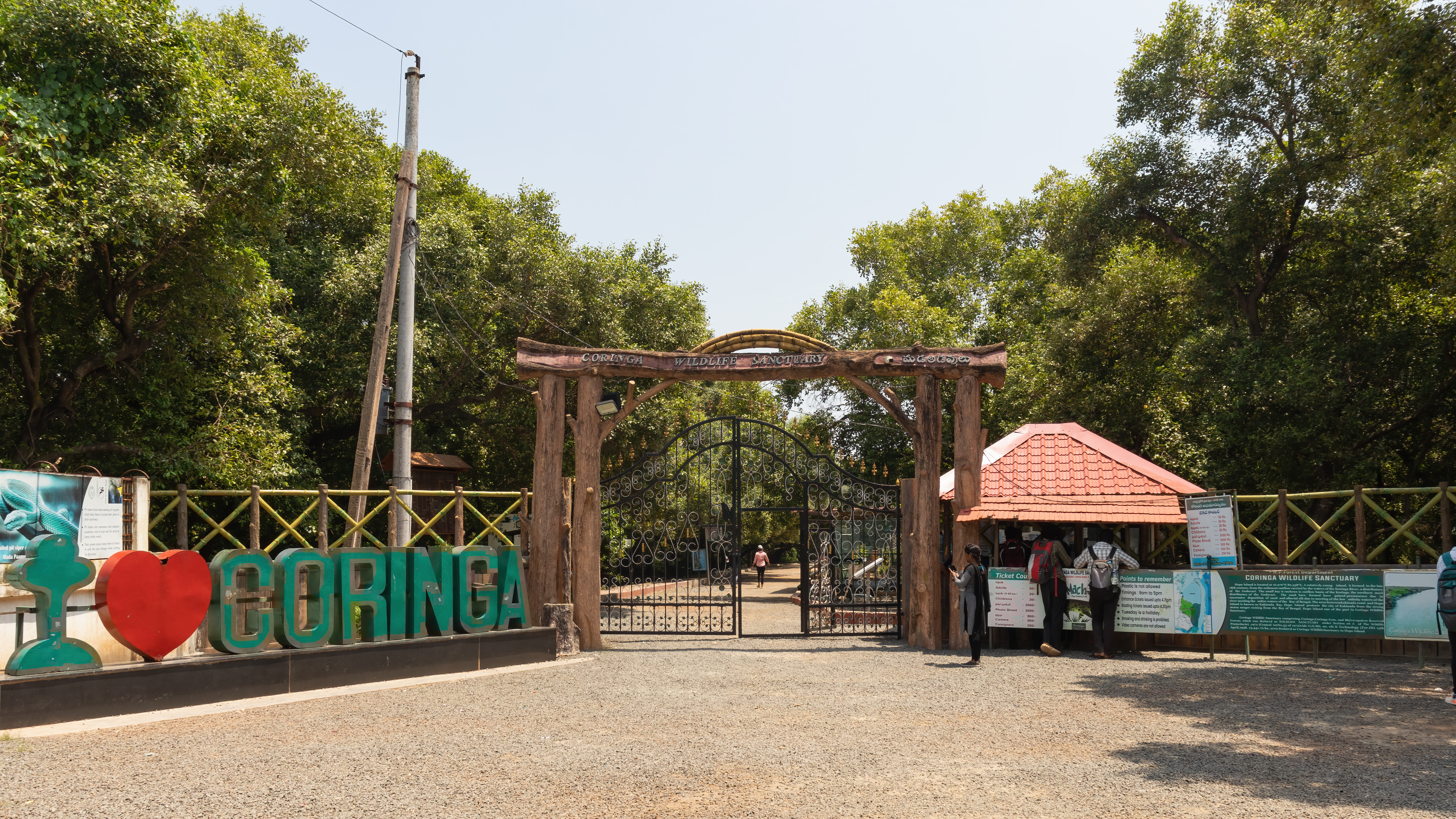
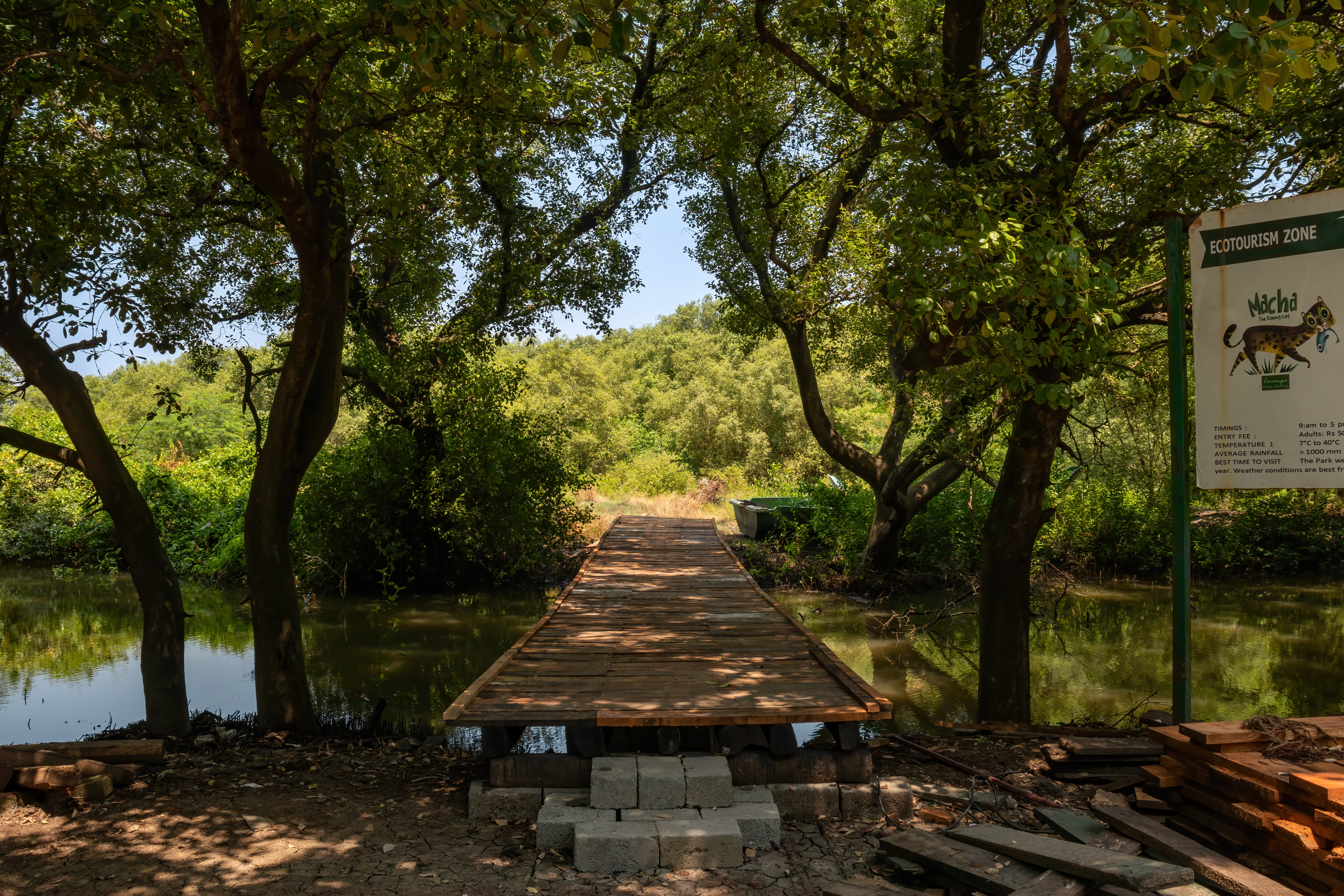
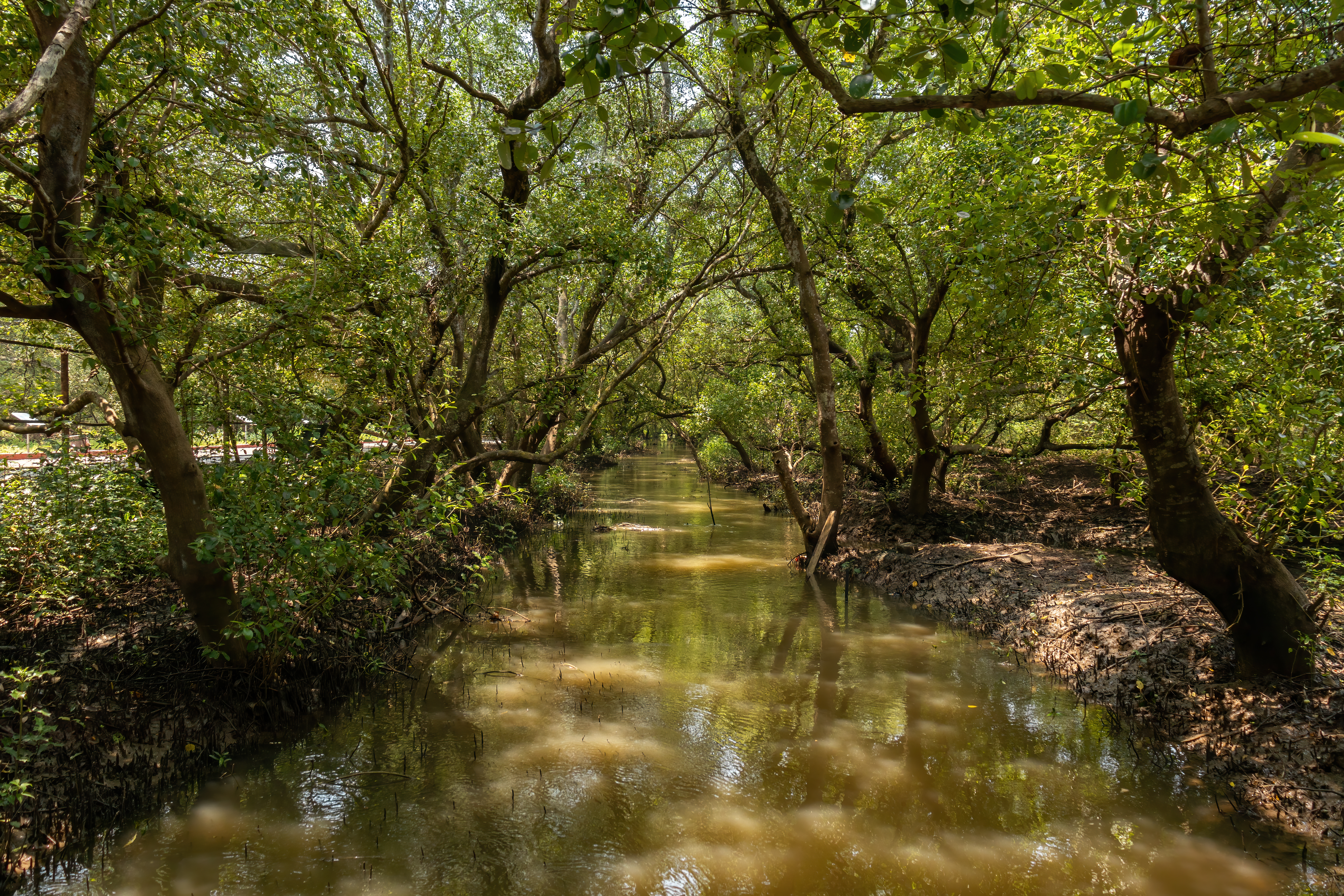
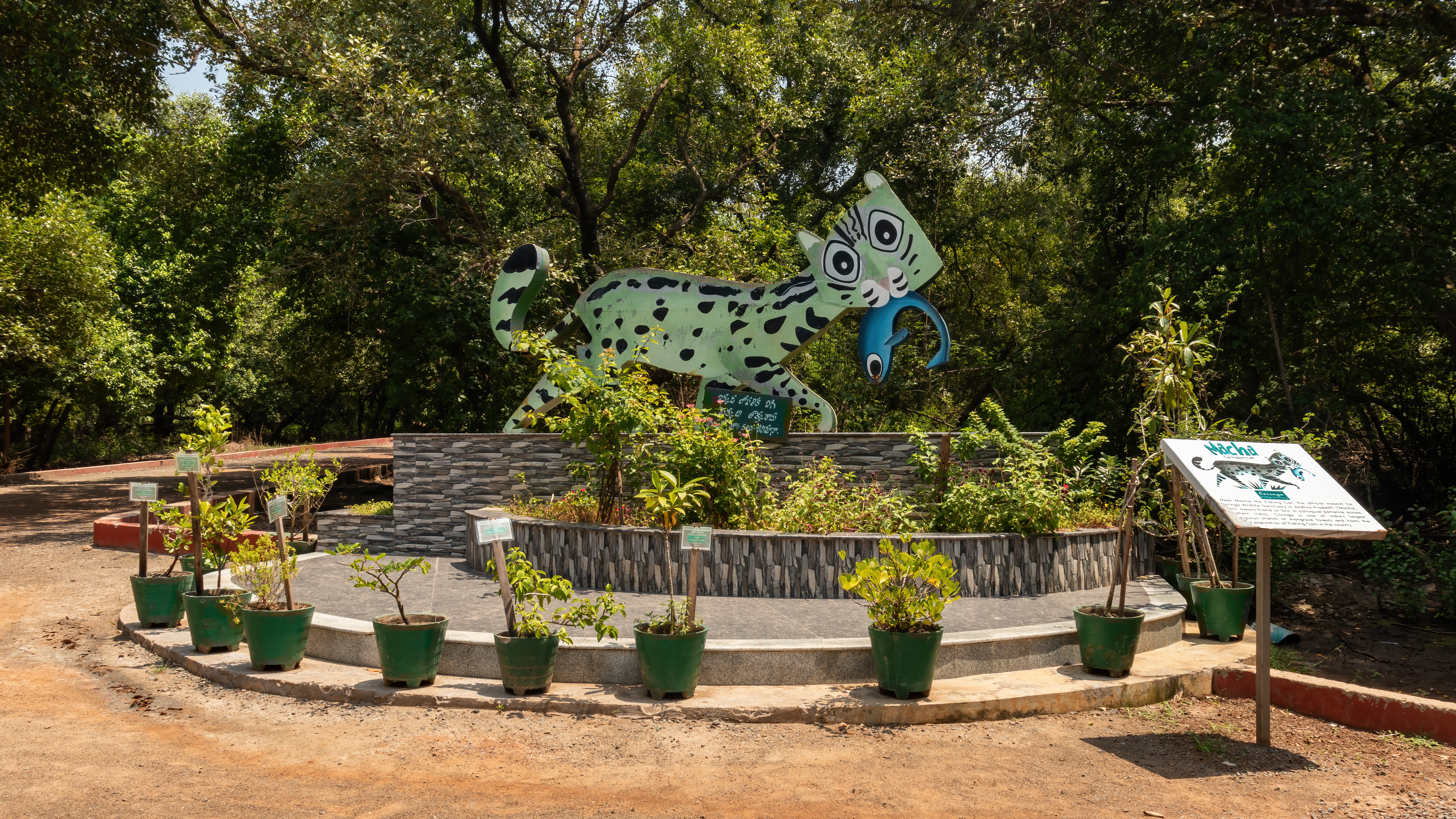
- Clockwise from top: Entrance Gateway to the reserve, Backwaters in the reserve, Fishing cat sculpture at the entrance and Pedestrian bridge inside the reserve

- Location in Andhra Pradesh, India Coringa (India)
- Coordinates: 16°48′N 82°14′E
- Country: India
- State: Andhra Pradesh
- District: Kakinada

Languages
  - Official: Telugu
- Time zone: IST
- Vehicle registration: AP
- Nearest city: Kakinada
- Climate: Average temperatures range from 76-90 °F, with annual rainfall between 34 and 64 inches.

Coringa, also known as Korangi, is a coastal village in Kakinada district, Andhra Pradesh, India. It consists of the village and the adjacent Hope Island, which was named by British officials in the hope that it would be protected from environmental disasters.

Once a thriving port city, Coringa was a trade hub on the Bay of Bengal in the 18th and 19th century. It hosted thousands of ships annually, with a large population. However, two devastating cyclones, one in 1789 and another in 1839, caused significant damage, leading to its decline. Historically, Coringa was a key migration point, with people from various parts of Andhra travelling through its seaport to countries like Burma and Malaysia, where they were called "Coranghees," after the port of Coringa.

== History ==
In 1759, the British established a shipbuilding and repair facility at Coringa, located on the Coringa River, a branch of the Godavari River. It had attracted European merchants, including the British, French, Dutch, and Portuguese, who used its waters as a safe anchorage.

By 1802, Coringa had become a prominent seaport, featuring a dry dock for ship repairs—the only such facility between Bombay and Calcutta at the time. Constructed by Ebenezer Roebuck, a British resident, the dock measured 155 feet in length and was equipped with steam engines for pumping. It was capable of accommodating Royal Navy vessels and underscored Coringa’s strategic importance in regional maritime activities. Historically, Coringa was the only location between Calcutta and Trincomalee capable of docking and repairing large ships. The area, including Cape Cori (now known as Hope Island), gained international recognition for its shipbuilding and repair capabilities.

Coringa’s prominence also extended to shipbuilding. The village was recognized as one of the greatest shipbuilding centres on the east coast of India, contributing to its reputation as a vital maritime location. However, its coastal position made it vulnerable to frequent storms and natural disasters.

Coringa suffered several catastrophic events that contributed to its decline. In 1784, a sea surge caused vessels to drift inland as far as Rajahmundry. The Great Coringa Cyclone of 1789 claimed approximately 20,000 lives and inflicted severe damage on the port. Another storm in May 1832 further weakened the settlement.

The most devastating event occurred on November 25, 1839, when a cyclone accompanied by a 40-foot storm surge obliterated Coringa’s port. Over 20,000 ships were destroyed, and the cyclone claimed around 300,000 lives overall, making it one of the deadliest in history. This disaster marked the beginning of Coringa’s irreversible decline.

=== Decline ===
Following the 1839 cyclone, Coringa’s port was never fully rebuilt. By the 1870s, it could only service small vessels, and silting of the river made navigation increasingly difficult. Although the village maintained limited trade with regions like Moulmein and Rangoon, its commercial importance diminished significantly.

The dry dock constructed by Roebuck fell into disuse, eventually becoming filled with silt. By the late 19th century, Coringa’s trade value had plummeted, and the once-thriving port was reduced to a shadow of its former self. Neighboring villages, such as Thallarevu, took over the shipbuilding activities, further cementing Coringa’s decline as a maritime centre. By 1901, the port had become inaccessible to large ships, and by 1905, shipbuilding activities had ceased altogether.

== Cyclones ==
=== 1789 Cyclone ===
The Great Coringa Cyclone struck in December 1789, causing severe damage with a series of three massive storm surges. The first wave drove ships ashore, and subsequent waves washed away everything that survived, killing at least 20,000 people. The effects of the cyclone reached as far as Rajahmundry to the northeast. The event was recorded in colonial and maritime records, marking a turning point in Coringa's maritime significance. After the cyclone, Coringa never regained its former prominence as a port. It served as a cautionary tale for future cyclone preparedness, especially in the Bay of Bengal region.

=== 1839 Cyclone ===
On 25 November 1839, a major cyclone with a massive 40-foot storm surge ravaged Coringa. The surge obliterated the port, sinking over 20,000 ships and causing a death toll estimated at around 300,000. This cyclone was notable as one of the first to be recorded in meteorological history and led to the first usage of the term "cyclone" by Henry Piddington. The destruction from the storm led to the decline of Coringa as a port and a significant loss to the Indian Ocean shipping industry.

== Geography ==
Coringa is located at the junction of the Godavari River and the Bay of Bengal. The region is low-lying and prone to flooding, particularly during the cyclone season, when heavy rain and high winds can cause major damage to the infrastructure. The surrounding area has mangrove forests, which serve as a buffer to mitigate the effects of storms.

== Economy ==
Historically, Coringa was known for its shipbuilding industry and its port facilities, which facilitated significant trade. Though the port no longer operates at the scale it once did, the village continues to rely on small-scale fishing and agriculture. The region's mangroves, which provide a rich habitat for biodiversity, have been protected as part of the Coringa Wildlife Sanctuary.

== See also ==
- Godavari River
- Coringa Wildlife Sanctuary
- Kakinada
