= Surya Rao =

Surya Rao or Surya Rau may refer to:

- Rao Venkata Kumara Mahipati Surya Rau (1885–1964), Maharajah of Pithapuram
- Surya Prakash Rao (born 1948), Indian cricket umpire
- Kutikuppala Surya Rao (born 1954), Indian physician

== See also ==
- Suryaraopeta, a census town in East Godavari district, Andhra Pradesh, India
