= Kakinada =

City in Andhra Pradesh, India

Kakinada Cocanada, Coringa, Kakinandiwada
- City
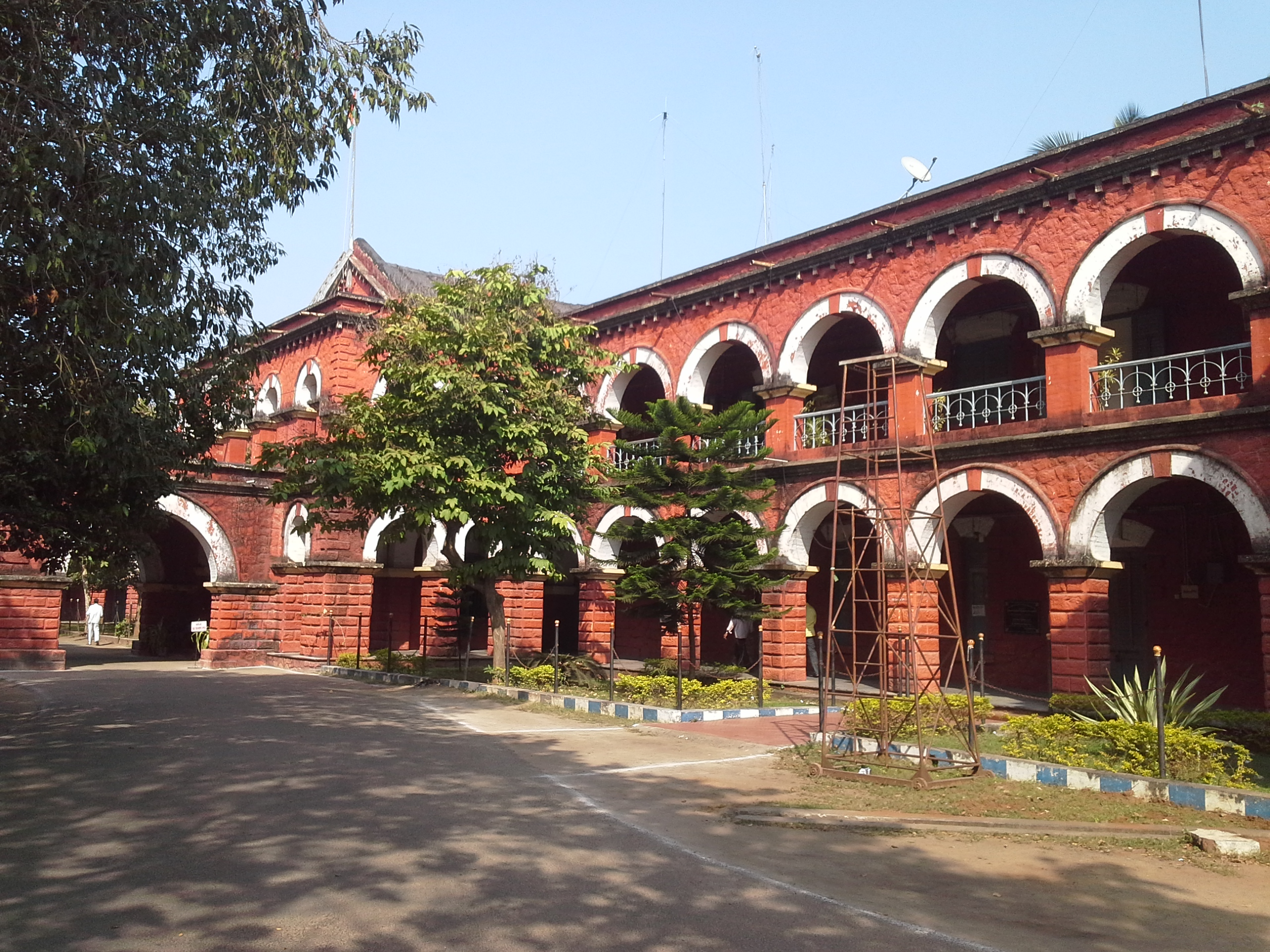
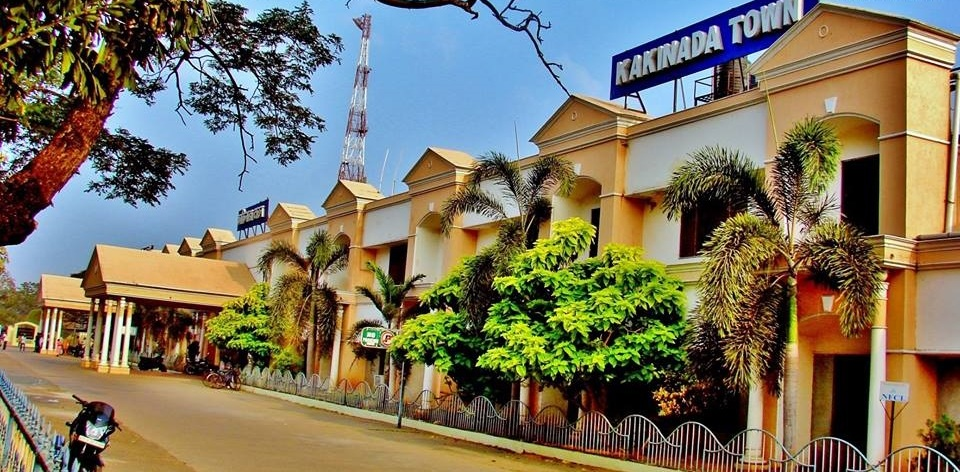
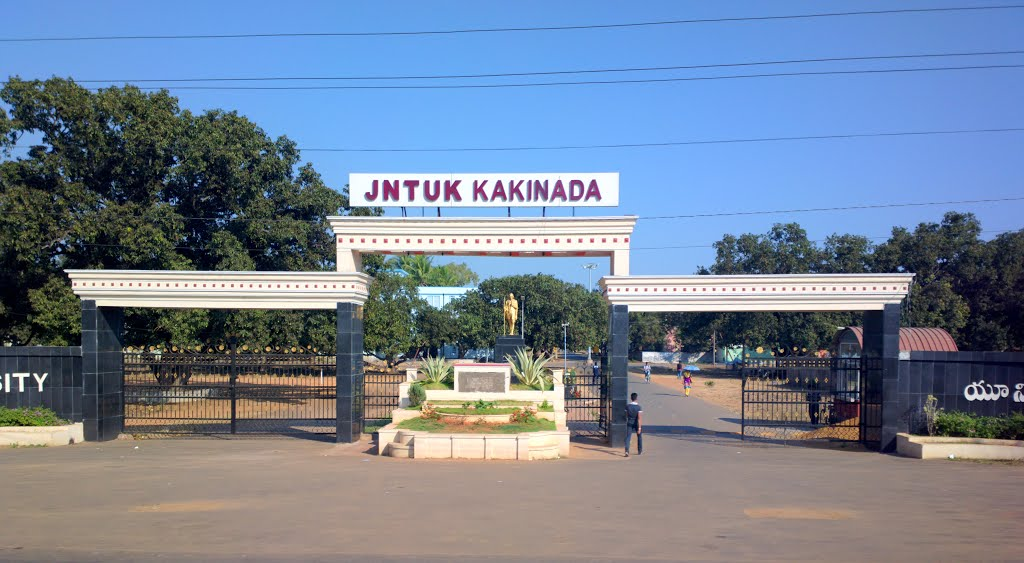
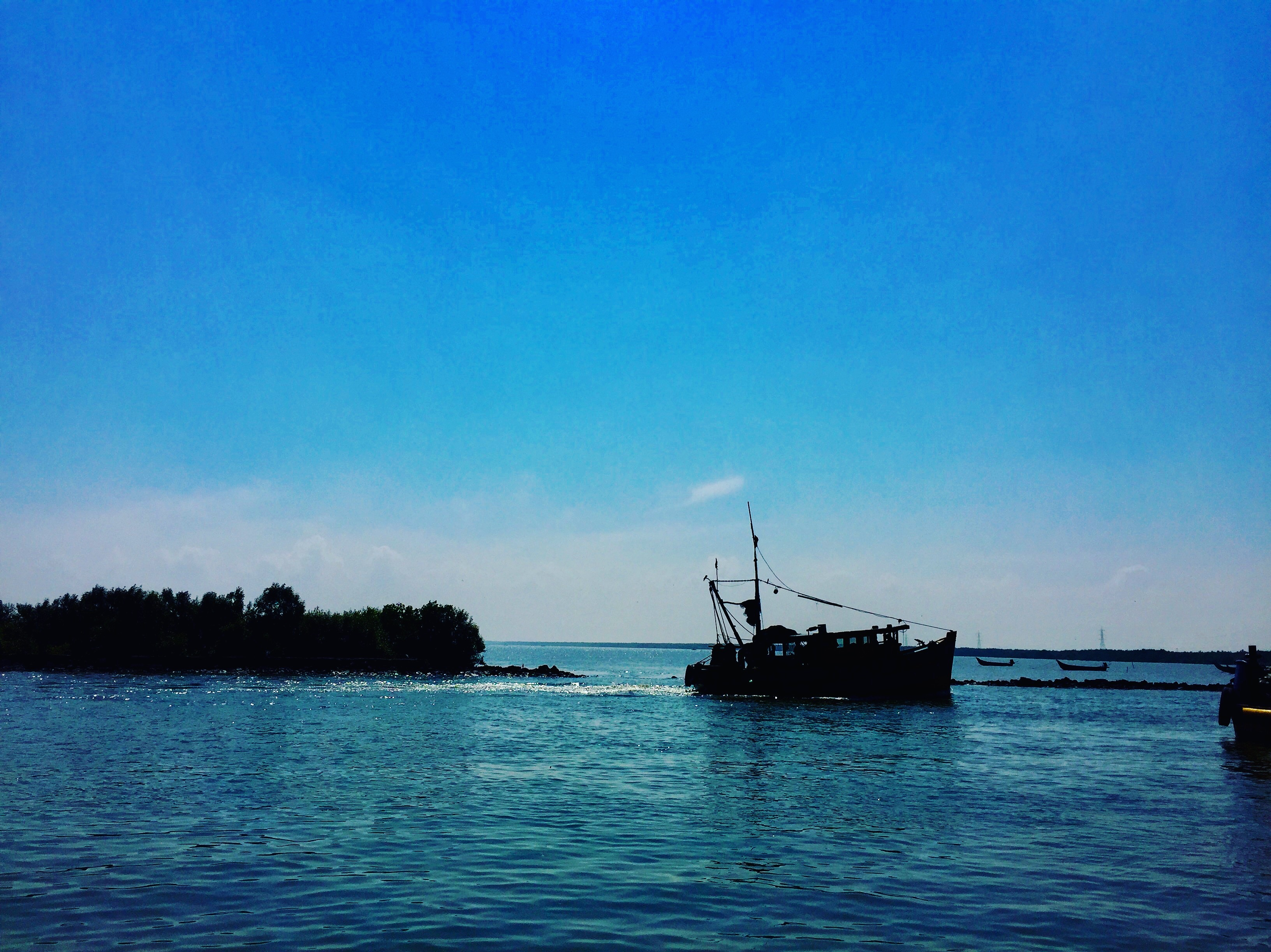
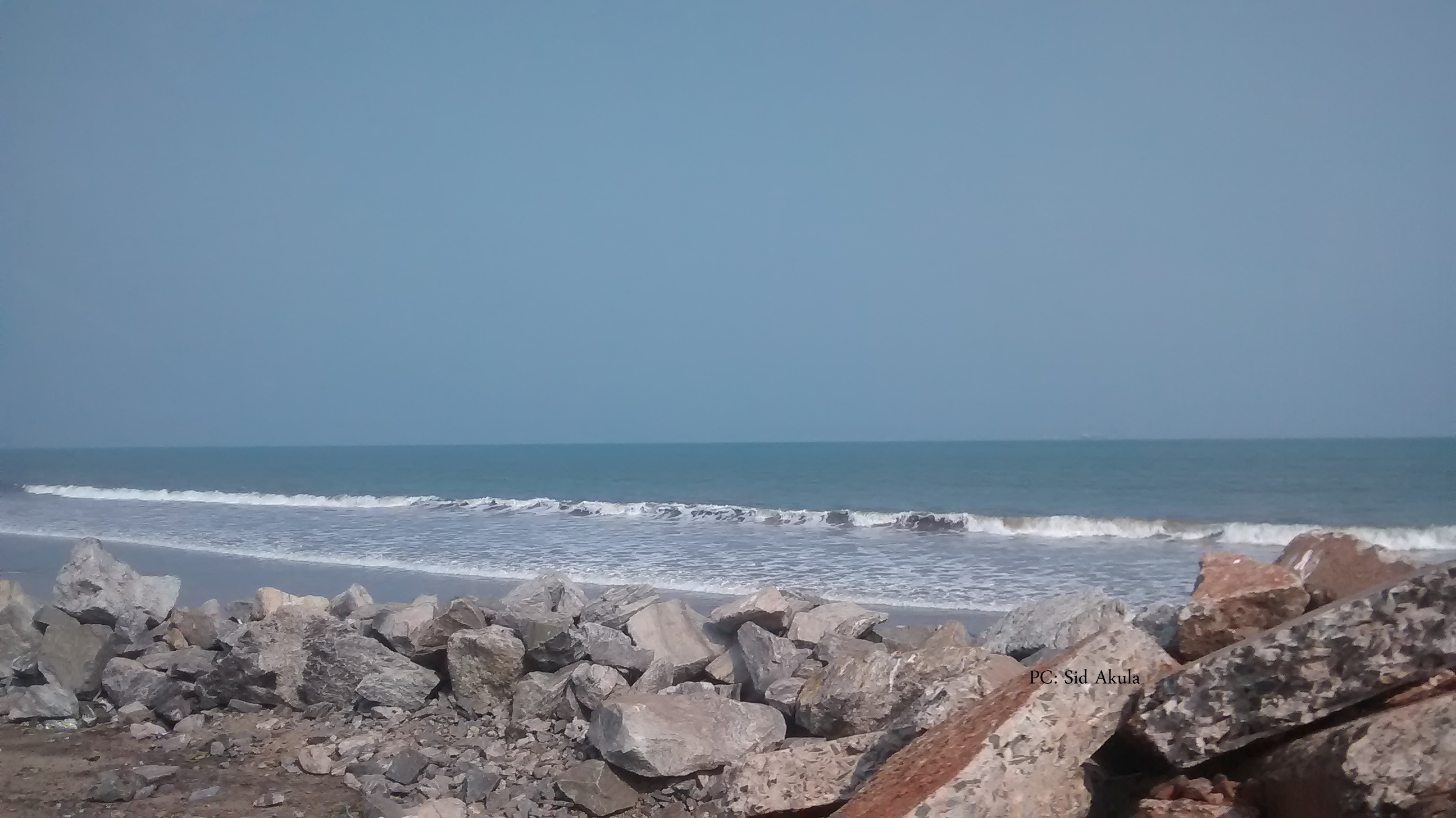
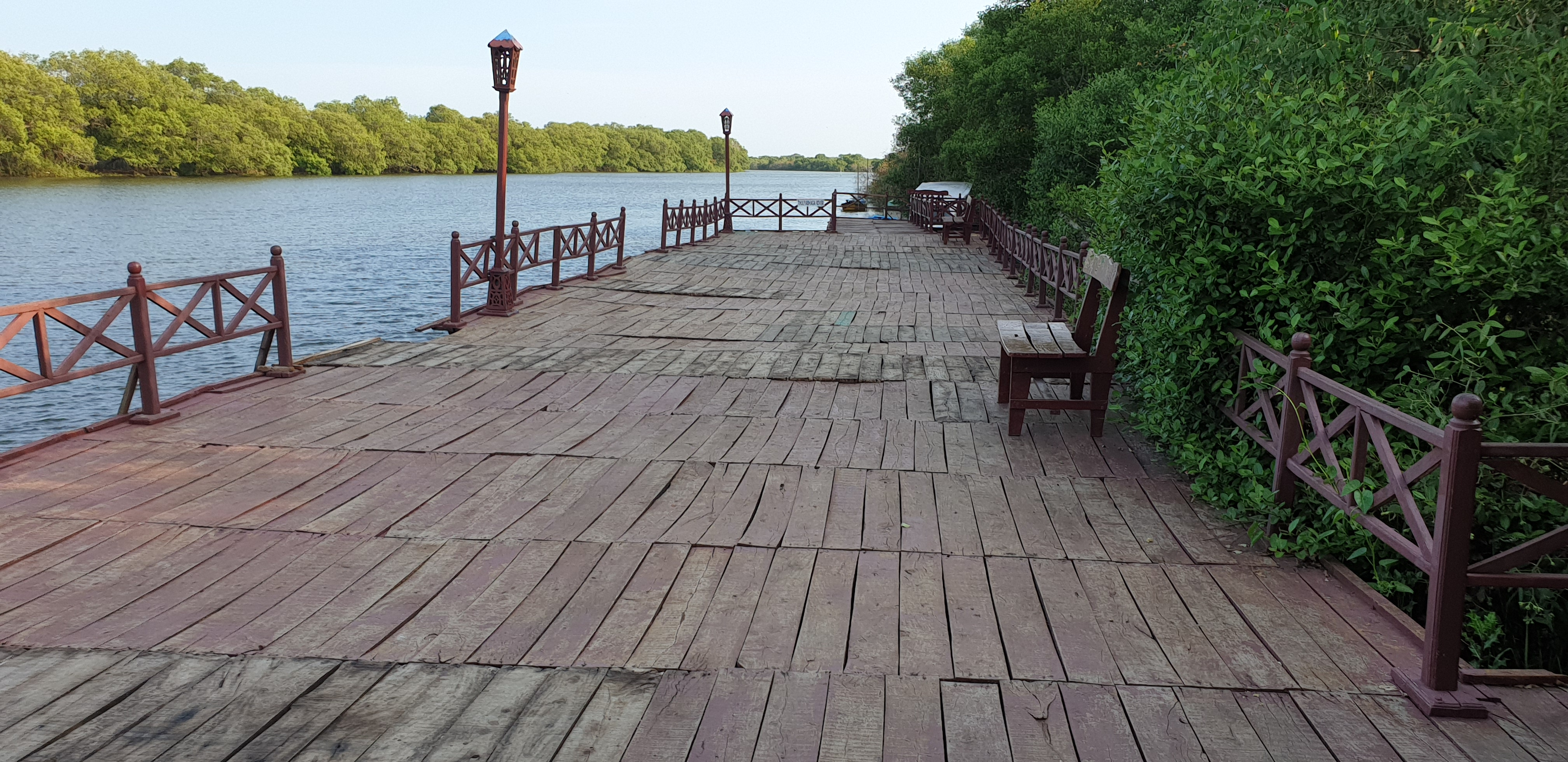
- Clockwise from top: District Collectorate Office, JNTU Kakinada, Kakinada Beach, Riverfront view in Coringa Wildlife Sanctuary, a boat at Kakinada Port, and Kakinada Town railway station
- Nicknames: Second Madras, Pensioners' Paradise
- Interactive map of Kakinada
- Location in Andhra Pradesh, India
- Coordinates: 16°57′58″N 82°15′18″E
- Country: India
- State: Andhra Pradesh
- District: Kakinada
- Incorporated (Municipality): 1866

Government
  - Type: Municipal Corporation
  - Body: Kakinada Municipal Corporation (KMC)
  - Mayor: Sunkara Siva Prasanna
  - MLA: Vanamadi Venkateswara Rao (Urban); Pantham Nanaji (Rural)
  - MP: Tangella Uday Srinivas

Area
  - City: 52.51 km^{2} (20.27 sq mi)

Population
  - City: 384,128 (6th) in AP
  - Density: 7,315/km^{2} (18,950/sq mi)
  - Metro: 443,028

Literacy
  - Literacy rate: 81.23%

Languages
  - Official: Telugu
- Time zone: UTC+5:30 (IST)
- PIN: 533001, 533002, 533003, 533004, 533005, 533006, 533016
- Area code: +91–884
- Vehicle Registration: AP05, AP06 (Former); AP39 (from 30 January 2019)
- Nominal GDP (2023–24): ₹20,876 crore (US$2.2 billion)
- Website: Kakinada Municipal Corporation

Kakinada (formerly known as Cocanada, and also referred to as Coringa and Kakinandiwada) is a port city and municipal corporation in the Indian state of Andhra Pradesh. Situated along the Bay of Bengal, it serves as the headquarters of Kakinada district and is a prominent economic and cultural centre in the region. It is the sixth most populous city in the state and is recognised as one of India's most livable and cleanest cities among those with a population under one million. Nicknamed the "Pensioners' Paradise," and "Second Madras," Kakinada is known for its well-planned layout and modern infrastructure.

The city rose to prominence in the mid-19th century, when the decline of the nearby Coringa port, caused by natural disasters and silting, redirected trade activities to Kakinada port. It became the administrative headquarters of the Godavari district in 1859, further growing as a cotton export hub during the American Civil War. By the late 19th century, Kakinada emerged as one of India's largest ports and the most significant in the Andhra region. According to the 1891 census, Kakinada was the most populous city in the Andhra region, a status it largely retained until the 1930s. During the colonial era, the city also gained importance as the starting point of the Buckingham Canal, a vital route for trade and transportation.

In modern times, Kakinada's economy is driven by industries such as fertilizer production, edible oil refining, natural gas extraction, food processing, IT, and power generation. The city also plays a vital role in the Krishna-Godavari Basin, serving as a key hub for petrochemical companies. Culturally, Kakinada is known for its iconic sweet, Kakinada Kaja, and has been the hometown of several notable personalities in Telugu cinema. Historically, Telugu migrants to countries like Burma and Malaysia were referred to as "Coringhees," a term derived from the nearby Coringa port, which served as a major migration point in Andhra.

Kakinada is also an educational hub, hosting institutions such as Jawaharlal Nehru Technological University (JNTU), Rangaraya Medical College, the Indian Institute of Foreign Trade (IIFT) campus, and Andhra Polytechnic, the first polytechnic college in Andhra Pradesh. The city also boasts nearby attractions such as Hope Island, which acts as a natural barrier protecting it from cyclones and tsunamis, and the Coringa Wildlife Sanctuary, home to vast mangrove forests. Notably, Kakinada was among the first 20 cities selected under the Smart Cities Mission.

== Etymology ==
The name "Kakinada" has multiple theories regarding its origin. One theory suggests that it is derived from the Telugu word "Koka" or "Coca," referring to saree products that were stored and exported by the Dutch when the city served as a Dutch settlement there by attaining the name Cocanada. Another theory links the name to the Telugu word "Kaki," meaning "crow," interpreting Kakinada as the "abode of crows," referencing the birds often seen catching fish along the shore. A third theory associates it with Kakasura, a mythological figure from the Ramayana. Additionally, some believe the name was derived from Kakichika, an ancient ruler of Vengi region getting its name Kakinandiwada.

During British rule, the city was referred as "Cocanada." Some suggest the name "Cocanada" was adapted by the British East India Company from "Co-Canada" for simplicity, as the original name was considered difficult to pronounce. The city was also referred to as "Coringa," a name derived from its proximity to the Koringa River.

The name "Cocanada" gained prominence with the establishment of the first Canadian Baptist Mission in the area under British administration. After India gained independence, the city was officially renamed Kakinada.

== History ==
=== Dutch settlement at Jaggernaickpuram ===
The Dutch East India Company (VOC) established a trading post at Jaggernaickpuram (also spelled Jagernaykpalam, among other variations) in present-day Kakinada, during the Dutch colonization of India. On 25 September 1734, Haji Muhammad Hussain, the Nawab of Rajahmundry, granted the Dutch a parwana and kaul, officially transferring the hamlet of "Jagernaykpalam" to the VOC for the construction of a trading lodge.

In 1781, during the Fourth Anglo-Dutch War, the English seized Dutch settlements along the Coromandel coast, including Jaggernaickpuram. The Dutch factory and public buildings were demolished that year. However, in 1784, after peace was declared, the Dutch factories were returned to the VOC.

The Dutch settlements were once again captured by the British during the wars of the French Revolution (1789-1795), but were handed back in 1818 through the Convention of 1814. Finally, in 1825, the Dutch territories in India, including Jaggernaickpuram, were transferred to the British under a treaty between Netherlands and the UK.

=== Establishment and decline of Coringa port ===
In 1759, the British established a shipbuilding and repair facility in the area, which came to be known as Coringa Town, located on the Coringa River, a branch of the Godavari River. Its strategic location and safe anchorage attracted European merchants, including the British, French, Dutch, and Portuguese, who utilized its port for trade and maritime activities on the Coromandel Coast.

In 1802, a wet dock was constructed in Coringa, making it a vital facility for repairing Royal Navy and other vessels. This dock was notable for being the only wet dock between Bombay (now Mumbai) and Calcutta (now Kolkata) and one of the few locations capable of accommodating large ships. Additionally, the area, including Cape Cori (now known as Hope Island), became internationally recognized for its shipbuilding industry, which flourished alongside its repair operations.

The town's coastal location, however, made it vulnerable to frequent storms and inundations. In 1784, a sea rise caused vessels to drift as far inland as Rajahmundry. Coringa also suffered significant damage from various storms, including a devastating storm in 1789 that claimed 20,000 lives, and another in May 1832 that further damaged the area. The most catastrophic of these was the cyclone of 25 November 1839, which had a storm surge estimated at 40 feet. This cyclone completely destroyed the port and around 20,000 vessels killing over 300,000 people across the region. This event was one of the first to be cited by Henry Piddington, who coined the term "cyclone" to describe such phenomena.

After the 1839 disaster, Coringa's port never fully recovered, and homes were relocated further inland. By the 1870s, the river had become too shallow, and the approaches too difficult, limiting the town's role to servicing only small craft. Despite this decline, Coringa continued to maintain some trade connections, particularly with Moulmein and Rangoon. Neighboring villages, such as Thallarevu, took over the shipbuilding activities, further cementing Coringa's decline as a maritime centre. By 1901, silting in the estuary rendered the port inaccessible to large ships, and by 1905, shipbuilding activities ceased, leading to the eventual closure of the port.

=== Growth of Cocanada ===
With the silting of Coringa Bay, Kakinada, then known as Cocanada, emerged as a prominent port, replacing Coringa. Its strategic location and growing exports established it as a significant trade centre in the 19th century. Regular steamer services, initiated in 1858-59, connected the town to Madras, Rangoon, and Calcutta, facilitating trade. By the 1860s, the British India Steam Navigation Company began regular maritime operations in the region.

In 1859, Kakinada became the administrative headquarters of the newly formed Godavari district following the reorganization of the Rajahmundry, Masulipatam, and Guntur Collectorates. This reorganization resulted in the creation of two districts, Godavari and Kistna, with their boundaries defined by the Upputeru and Tamaleru rivers. Since its designation, Kakinada has consistently served as a district headquarters, cementing its role as a key administrative and economic centre in the region.

The American Civil War (1861–1865) further boosted Kakinada's prominence as a key shipping hub for cotton from Guntur. With the disruption of cotton supply to mills in Lancashire during the war, the demand for cotton surged. As a result, Kakinada saw a significant increase in port activity, playing a crucial role in meeting the growing demand for cotton by supplying it to international markets. In 1865, infrastructure developments included an iron-girder bridge linking Kakinada with Jagannadhapuram and a lighthouse to support maritime activities. These improvements bolstered trade and communication in the region.

Kakinada was established as a municipality in 1866, reflecting its growing importance. The European Chamber of Commerce, founded in 1868, represented European firms, while the native Chamber of Commerce worked alongside it to promote trade. The local economy thrived on exports of cotton, gingelly oil seeds, sugar, and rice, while imports included iron and copper. The town also became a centre for publications, including the Cocanada Advertiser, a mercantile newspaper, and Suddhiranjani, a Telugu weekly. In 1852, the Pithapuram zamindar established a middle school, which was elevated to a second-grade college in 1884, becoming Pithapur Rajah's College. This institution soon gained prominence as a leading educational centre.

By 1871, Kakinada's population reached 17,839, with Hindus making up 94% of the populace. Over the next decades, the population grew significantly, increasing by 61.8% between 1871 and 1881, and 40.5% between 1881 and 1891. By 1891, Kakinada's population reached 40,553, making it the most populous city in Andhra. It retained this position until 1921 when it briefly fell to second place with a population of 53,348, narrowly surpassed by Rajahmundry's 53,791 residents. However, Kakinada reclaimed its status as the region's largest city by 1931, with its population rising to 65,952.

By the early 20th century, Kakinada had emerged as the principal port on the Coromandel Coast, north of Madras. In 1902–03, it was ranked fifth among the ports of the Madras Presidency in terms of total trade and held the twelfth position among all ports in British India. Within the region of present-day Andhra Pradesh, Kakinada was the largest port and ranked seventh among the ports in the territory of modern India. The port became a thriving commercial hub, attracting prominent European and native merchants, including firms like Ralli Brothers, Gordon, Woodroffe & Co., and Volkart Brothers. Kakinada port played a crucial role in trade within the Godavari district and its hinterlands, and even with parts of the Nizam's Dominions. Local industries, such as rice mills, cheroot factories, and salt works, supported by companies like Simson & Co. and Innes & Co., contributed to the town's economic growth. But, its economy remained primarily focused on shipping. The port’s exports included cotton (to the UK, France, and Belgium), oilseeds (to France and the UK), rice (to Sri Lanka, Réunion, Mauritius), and tobacco (to Rangoon), while imports included cotton goods, gunny bags, rice, and kerosene.

By the early 20th century, Kakinada was home to five printing presses. Among them, the Sujana Ranjani Press published Telugu books, along with a weekly newspaper, Ravi, and a monthly magazine, Savitri. Another press produced a monthly magazine called Sarasvati. In 1923, Kakinada hosted the All India Congress Committee (AICC) meeting from 28 December to 1 January 1924. The event became notable for a controversy over the rendition of Vande Mataram, which highlighted religious sensitivities of the time.

During World War II, on 6 April 1942, Kakinada was targeted by a Japanese air raid. A single aircraft attacked the port, damaging two ships and causing casualties, including one death and five injuries. This marked one of the earliest Japanese air raids on India's eastern coast during the war.

Today, Kakinada is a viral port city renowned for its industrial and economic importance within Andhra Pradesh. It serves as a key hub for trade, maritime activities, and cultural heritage in the region.

== Geography ==
Kakinada is located at 16.93°N 82.22°E, with the 82-degrees east longitude passing through the city. The city has an average elevation of 2 meters (6.6 feet), and several areas lie below sea level.

The city is divided into two regions, connected by bridges. The southern part, Jagannadhapuram, is separated from the main city by the Buckingham Canal. The canal and its branches form Medaline Island, which borders the city to the southwest.

Kakinada features an industrial belt that runs north–south, separating the eastern part of the city from the coast. To the southeast, Kakinada Bay and surrounding marshlands are home to India's second-largest mangrove forest, which includes the Coringa Wildlife Sanctuary. The Gouthami, a branch of the Godavari River, flows into the Bay of Bengal near the city.

=== Climate ===
Kakinada experiences a tropical savanna climate (Köppen: Aw), characterized by hot and humid conditions throughout most of the year. The hottest period occurs in late May and early June, with maximum temperatures ranging from 38°C to 42°C (100°F to 108°F). January is the coolest month, with minimum temperatures of 18°C to 20°C (64°F to 68°F). The city receives most of its rainfall during the southwest monsoon, though it also gets significant rainfall from the northeast monsoon between mid-October and mid-December. Kakinada is frequently affected by cyclones originating in the Bay of Bengal.

Prevailing winds are from the southwest for most of the year, except from October to January when they shift to the northeast. The city's average annual rainfall is between 110 and 115 centimetres (43 to 45 inches)

In October 2025, the India Meteorological Department (IMD) reported that a depression over the southeast Bay of Bengal was likely to intensify into a cyclonic storm and approach the Andhra Pradesh coast near Kakinada with wind speeds up to 100 km/h. Due to its coastal location, Kakinada periodically experiences such cyclonic systems during the monsoon season.

Climate data for Kakinada (1991–2020, extremes 1901–2020)
Month	Jan	Feb	Mar	Apr	May	Jun	Jul	Aug	Sep	Oct	Nov	Dec	Year
Record high °C (°F)	34.6 (94.3)	37.8 (100.0)	40.0 (104.0)	42.8 (109.0)	46.9 (116.4)	47.4 (117.3)	41.7 (107.1)	38.4 (101.1)	38.0 (100.4)	37.3 (99.1)	35.9 (96.6)	34.0 (93.2)	47.4 (117.3)
Mean daily maximum °C (°F)	29.5 (85.1)	31.4 (88.5)	34.1 (93.4)	36.0 (96.8)	37.7 (99.9)	35.7 (96.3)	33.0 (91.4)	32.4 (90.3)	32.7 (90.9)	32.2 (90.0)	30.8 (87.4)	29.5 (85.1)	32.9 (91.2)
Daily mean °C (°F)	24.8 (76.6)	26.4 (79.5)	28.8 (83.8)	30.7 (87.3)	32.3 (90.1)	31.1 (88.0)	29.3 (84.7)	28.9 (84.0)	28.9 (84.0)	28.4 (83.1)	26.7 (80.1)	24.8 (76.6)	28.4 (83.2)
Mean daily minimum °C (°F)	20.3 (68.5)	21.5 (70.7)	24.0 (75.2)	26.2 (79.2)	28.0 (82.4)	27.4 (81.3)	26.2 (79.2)	26.0 (78.8)	26.0 (78.8)	24.9 (76.8)	22.7 (72.9)	20.3 (68.5)	24.4 (75.9)
Record low °C (°F)	12.0 (53.6)	15.6 (60.1)	17.2 (63.0)	18.9 (66.0)	20.5 (68.9)	21.4 (70.5)	21.1 (70.0)	21.7 (71.1)	21.3 (70.3)	17.2 (63.0)	14.4 (57.9)	13.9 (57.0)	12.0 (53.6)
Average rainfall mm (inches)	7.6 (0.30)	9.4 (0.37)	6.2 (0.24)	22.0 (0.87)	53.3 (2.10)	128.0 (5.04)	177.5 (6.99)	156.0 (6.14)	201.7 (7.94)	248.0 (9.76)	103.9 (4.09)	13.2 (0.52)	1,126.8 (44.36)
Average rainy days	0.6	0.7	0.4	1.4	2.5	7.3	11.5	9.6	9.4	8.7	3.6	0.9	56.5
Average relative humidity (%) (at 17:30 IST)	67	63	61	62	62	62	70	73	75	74	70	67	67
Source 1: India Meteorological Department
Source 2: Tokyo Climate Center (mean temperatures 1991–2020)

== Demographics ==
Historical population
Year	Pop.	±%
1871	17,839	—
1881	28,856	+61.8%
1891	40,553	+40.5%
1901	48,096	+18.6%
1911	54,110	+12.5%
1921	53,348	−1.4%
1931	65,952	+23.6%
1941	75,140	+13.9%
1951	99,952	+33.0%
1961	122,865	+22.9%
1971	164,200	+33.6%
1981	226,409	+37.9%
1991	279,875	+23.6%
2001	327,541	+17.0%
2011	384,128	+17.3%

As of 2011 Census of India, Kakinada had a population of 443,028, with 222,461 males and 220,567 females. The Kakinada Urban Agglomeration also had a population of 443,028, comprising 217,459 males and 225,569 females, including the city's outgrowths. Kakinada ranks as the 115th largest city in India by population and is one of the fastest-growing cities in Andhra Pradesh.

== Governance ==
Kakinada Municipal Corporation covers an area of 16.63 km^{2} (6.42 sq mi), while the urban agglomeration extends over an area of 40.36 km^{2} (15.58 sq mi). The urban agglomeration includes the Kakinada Municipal Corporation, census towns such as Chidiga, Ramanayyapeta, and Suryaraopeta, as well as the outgrowths of Ganganapalle, Sarpavaram, Vakalapudi, and Turangi.

== Economy ==
Kakinada's economy primarily relies on industry, agriculture, and fishing. Key agricultural products include paddy and coconut, while the industrial sector is dominated by edible oil refineries, fertilizers, and natural gas production. In the late 1940s, around the time of Indian independence, the city had minimal industrial activity, with its economy centered on agriculture and fishing. By the early 1980s, before the establishment of fertilizer companies, the local economy expanded to include the textile industry, auto parts manufacturing, steel-related ancillary units, alongside its traditional reliance on agriculture and fishing.

=== Kakinada port ===
Hope Island, about 5 kilometres (3.1 mi) from the coast, makes Kakinada Port a natural harbour. It is home to two ports namely, an Anchorage port and a Deep-water port (and also third port is going to be constructed in KSEZ which will be Greenfield Seaport ). Kakinada's deep-water port is the second-largest in the state (after Visakhapatnam port) and the first in the country to be built in a public-private partnership, in 1996 It is operated by Kakinada Seaports. Before the deep-water port was built, the Anchorage port was the largest of India's 40 minor ports.

Kakinada's principal exports include seafood (Prawns, Shrimp, Fish) and related products, agricultural products (including rice and corn), oilmeals, processed food products, chemicals, iron ore, bauxite powder and biofuel. Imports include chemicals, edible oils and agricultural products (including wheat and sugar).

=== Industrial sector ===
A number of industries and edible oil refineries, and serves as a base for a thriving oil and gas industry for the state of Andhra Pradesh are established at Kakinada.

==== Agro−products ====
Coconuts are exported by several companies in and around Kakinada. The Murugappa Group-owned EID Parry (India) and Cargill International joint venture, Silk Road Sugars, has a port-based stand-alone sugar refinery in Kakinada with a capacity of 600,000 tonnes.,

==== Edible oil refineries and biofuel plants ====
In 2002, several edible-oil refineries were established in Kakinada, with a refining capacity of 3,000 tons per day; they include Acalmar Oils and Fats (taken over by Adani Wilmar), Ruchi Infrastructure and Nikhil Refineries. The port facilitates the importation of crude palm and soybean oil.

Vakalapudi Industrial Park has attracted over $10 million in investment from biodiesel companies such as Reliance Industries, Natural Bioenergy and Universal Bio Fuel. Andhra Pradesh has entered into an agreement with Reliance Industries for jatropha planting. The company selected 200 acres (81 ha) of land in Kakinada to grow jatropha for quality biodiesel fuel.

=== Information technology ===
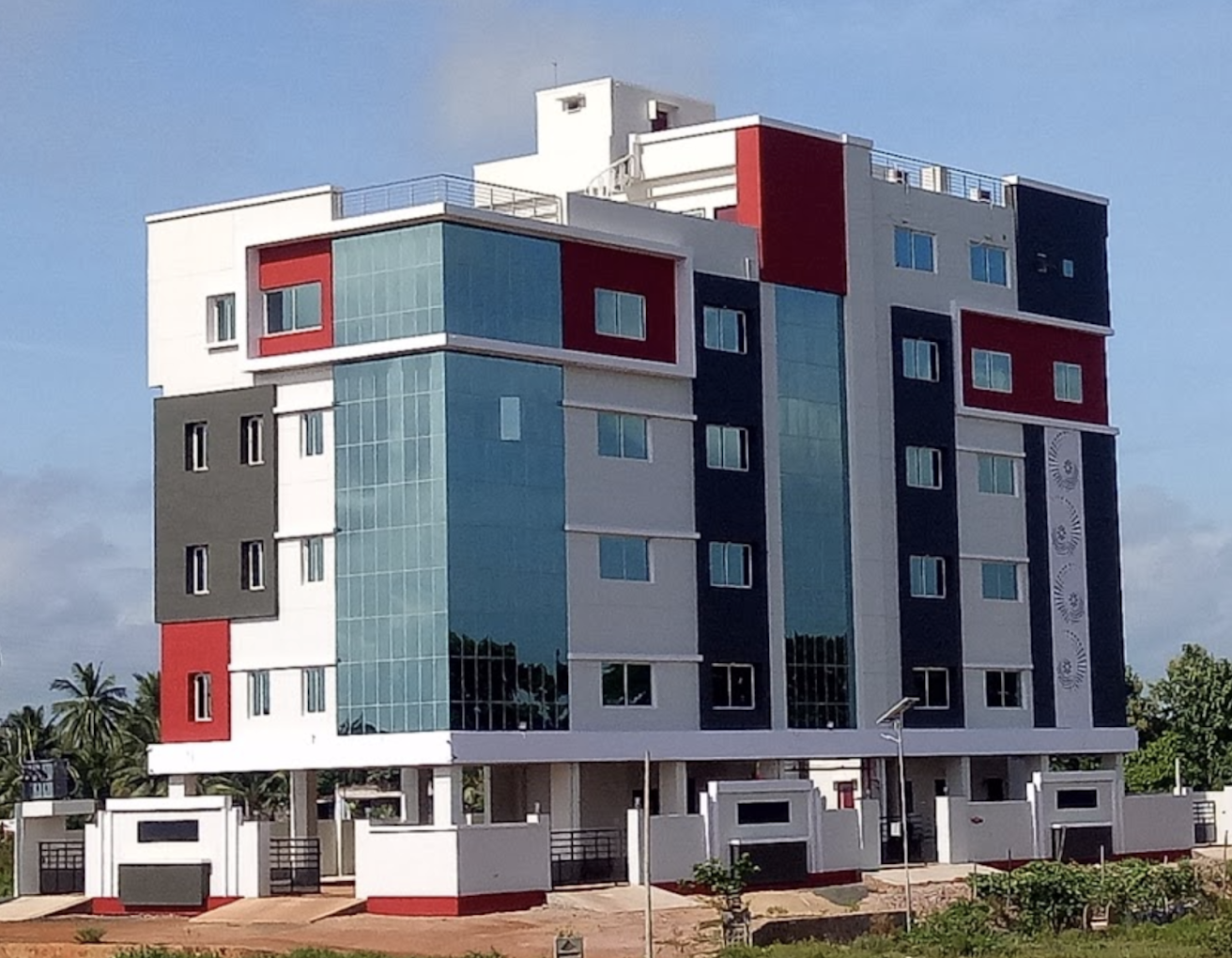
Ratan Towers in ADB Road, Kakinada where companies such as Krify, Avineon are operating

Kakinada is a tier-II city. Software Technology Parks of India (STPI) established a facility here in 2007. Since then, several IT companies have come up in the city, mainly due to its educated workforce available in the city.

Nearly, 35 Software and IT companies are operating from Kakinada, including Krify, Avineon, Cyient.

An IT Association by the name "Godavari IT Association of East and West Godavari districts" (GITA) which an association of IT companies in the twin Godavari districts is formed in 2008 which is based in the city. Since 2016, GITA is merged with "IT Association of Andhra Pradesh" (ITAAP) forming a separate chapter called ITAAP Godavari Chapter.

=== Power generation ===
There are several power plants in and around Kakinada. Spectrum Power Generation has a 208-MW plant and was one of the first Independent Power Producers in the country. The company is planning to expand its capacity to 1350 MW in phases. Tenders for a 350-MW expansion have been requested. A 220-MW power station (being expanded to 2400 MW at a cost of Rs 100 billion) owned by Reliance Energy and a 464-MW combined-cycle power plant by GVK Group are in operation at Samalkota (Kakinada Rural). These plants supply electricity to the state's transmission utility, AP Transco, under a power purchase agreement.

=== Natural gas and petroleum ===
Kakinada is the base for Oil and Natural Gas Corporation's Eastern Offshore Asset. Several oil companies use Kakinada for oil and gasoline shipments. Baker Hughes and Schlumberger are field-development companies working on offshore natural-gas fields near the city. The Krishna Godavari Basin is considered the largest natural gas basin in India. Significant discoveries of oil and natural gas were made by Oil and Natural Gas Corporation (ONGC), Gujarat State Petroleum Corporation and Reliance, which has been extracting gas from its KG D6 block off the Kakinada coast. Reliance has an onshore terminal in Gadimoga, about 25 kilometres (16 mi) from Kakinada, to process and distribute gas to other parts of the country. Reliance Gas Transportation Infrastructure (RGTIL) has built a 1,440-kilometre (890 mi) pipeline from Kakinada to Bharuch (Gujarat) to transport 120 million cubic meters per day (mcmd) of natural gas from the Krishna-Godavari fields (owned by Reliance Industries) across India to its west coast. In 2010, the Petroleum and Natural Gas Regulatory Board awarded Kakinada's gas-distribution project to Bhagyanagar Gas, a consortium of GAIL and Hindustan Petroleum.

== Culture ==
=== Festivals ===
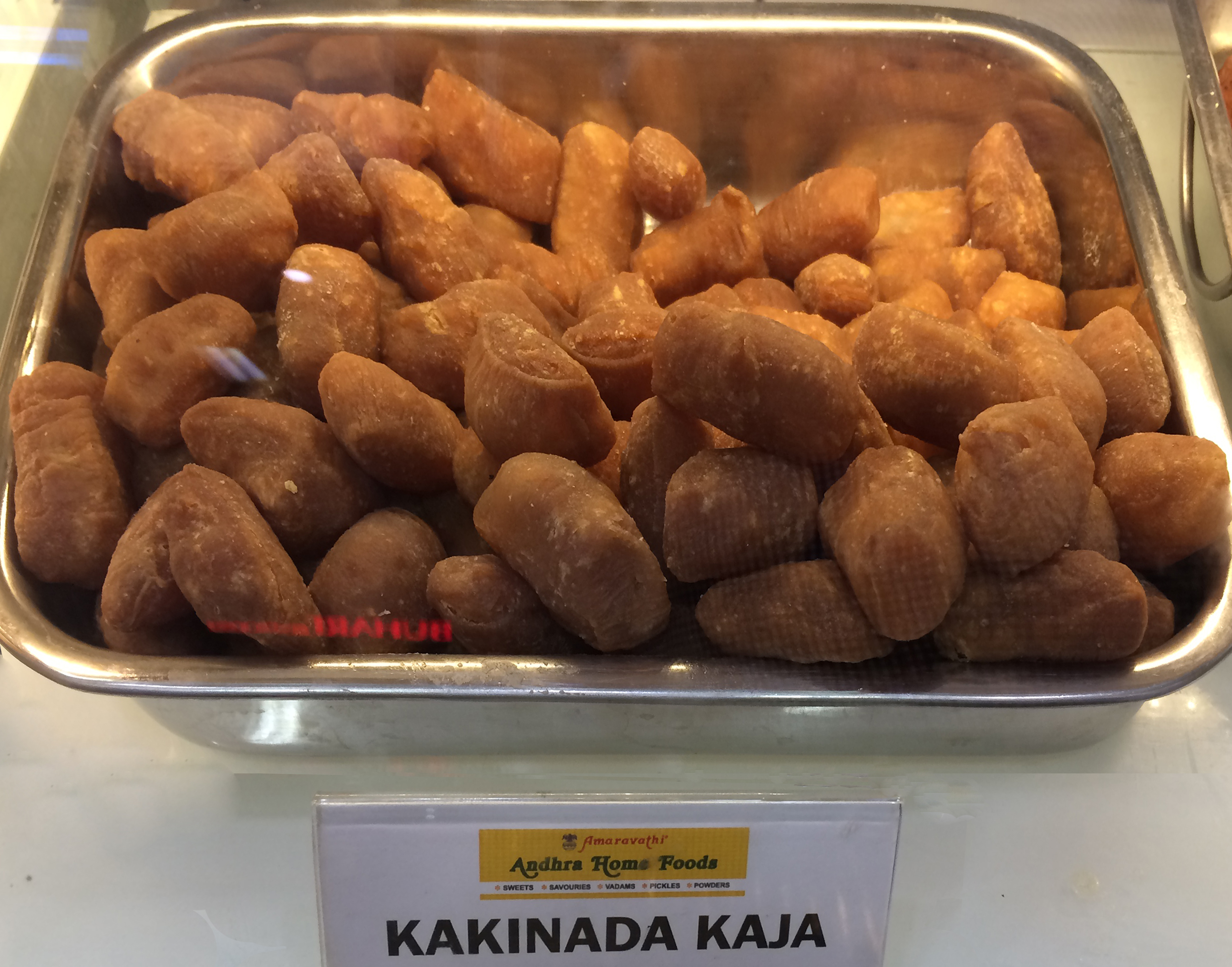
Kakinada Kaja, a sweet delicacy of Kakinada

Kakinada Beach Festival (also Sagara Sambaralu) is a music festival held in Kakinada. It was declared as an annual festival by the government of Andhra Pradesh in 2012. It is a three-day event where many artists perform.

=== Notable personalities ===
Kakinada has made notable contributions to Telugu cinema (Tollywood) with several prominent actors, actresses, and filmmakers hailing from the city. Among the notable figures are Anjali Devi, Suryakantham, Relangi, Rao Gopal Rao, Chitti Babu, P. Adinarayana Rao, C. Pullayya, P. B. Sreenivas, C. S. Rao, Krishna Bhagawan, Gunnam Gangaraju, Goutham Raju, Ohmkar, and singer Anjana Sowmya.

In addition to its contributions to cinema, Kakinada is also the hometown of Indian cricketer Hanuma Vihari and the freedom fighter Baru Alivelamma.

== Literature ==
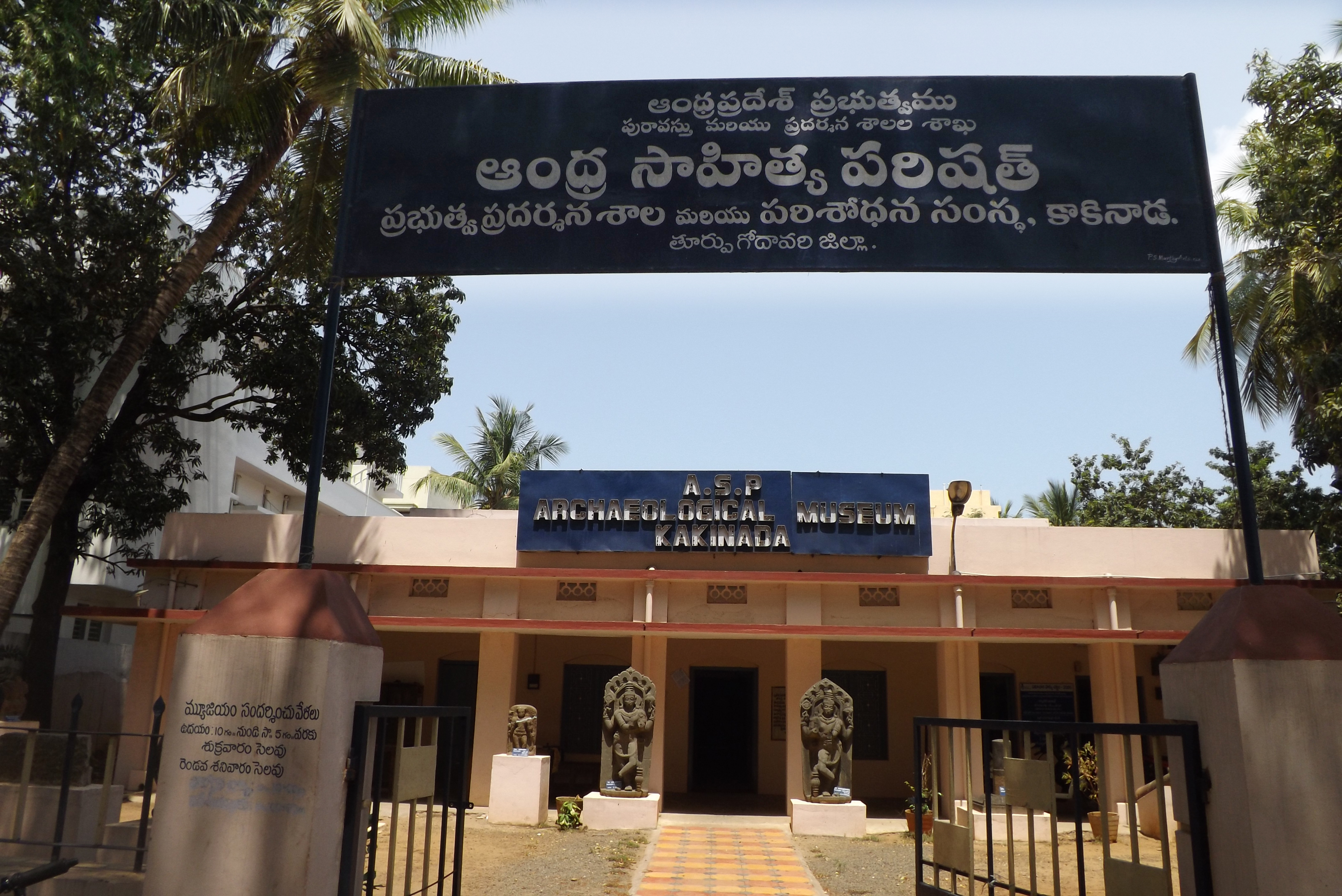
Andhra Sahitya Parishat, an archaeological museum at Kakinada

Kakinada has been a significant hub for Telugu literature, hosting numerous scholars, poets, and historians who have contributed extensively to the language and its history. The Sri Suryaraya Andhra Nighantuvu, considered the most comprehensive monolingual Telugu dictionary, was first published in its initial four volumes by the Andhra Sahitya Parishad in Kakinada between 1936 and 1944. This monumental work, featuring over 1.1 lakh words, provides detailed information about word origins, meanings, synonyms, and historical usage in literature, showcasing the city's pivotal role in advancing Telugu linguistic studies.

Kasibhatta Brahmaiah Sastry (1863–1940), a notable Sanskrit and Telugu scholar, was among the eminent figures in Kakinada's literary landscape. Another celebrated personality, Garikapati Narasimha Rao, earned the title Maha Sahasravadhani for performing one thousand Avadhanam feats, a challenging Telugu poetry competition. He also authored the epic poem Sagaraghosha, adding to his reputation as a literary luminary.

Modern contributions to Telugu literature include Ryali Prasad, a poet, short story writer, and historian. He authored 32 epic poems and historical works, delving into various subjects, including the history of Kakinada. His notable works include Kakinada Charitra, a comprehensive history of the city. Prasad was also skilled in performing Telugu Avadhanam in free verse poetry, exemplifying his versatility as a writer. Bolloju Baba, a contemporary poet and historian residing in Kakinada, has further enriched the region's literary heritage. He has authored 11 books, six of which focus on literature and the remaining on history. His works include Ancient Cities of East Godavari and Yanam under French Colonial Rule, which highlight the historical and cultural significance of the region.

== Transport ==
The city has various modes of transport in terms of road, rail and sea. Previously private city buses and rickshaws used to dominate the roads but after massive amount of urbanisation the primary mode of intra-city public transport is auto rickshaws and there are about 7,000 of them being operated in the city limits with an additional of 3,000 from the surrounding settlements. Non-transport vehicles cover, Motorcycles, bicycles. For cyclists and motorists, there are planned cycling paths, bicycle sharing stations, and bike hiring outlets.

=== Roadways ===
Kakinada is connected by road to the rest of the state and other cities of India by means of National Highways. National Highway 216 which stretches from Kathipudi to Ongole passes through Kakinada. The bypass road is under construction which reduces the traffic in the city It is a well planned city with Grid type Road network. The city has a total road length of 719.21 km.state highway 42 connects Kakinada with other cities. ADB Road and Canal Road connects Kakinada with Rajamahendravaram. Government is going to construct a new national highway to Tuni along coast under Sagaramala scheme.

=== Railways ===
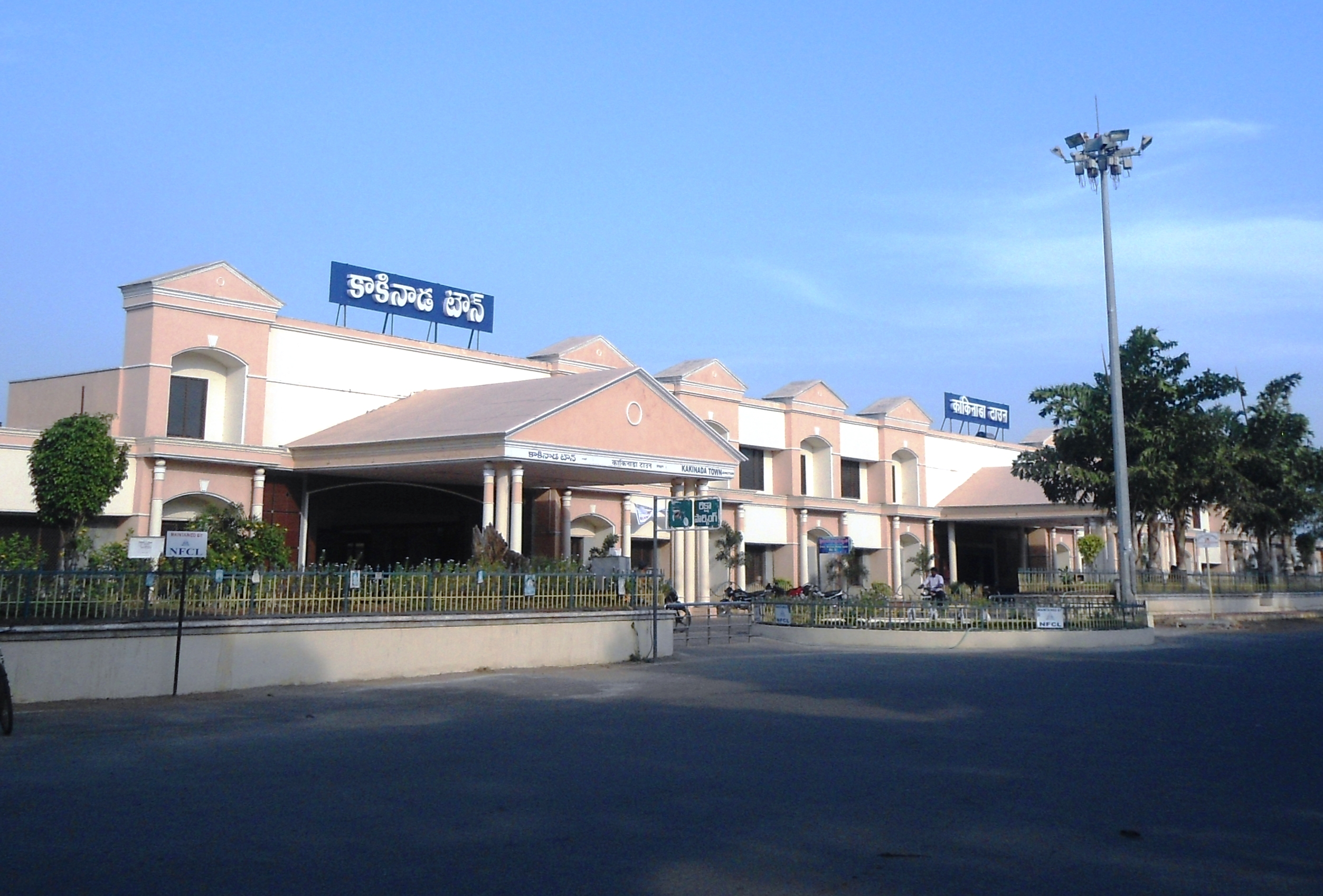
Kakinada Town Jn. Railway Station main entrance

Kakinada Town and Kakinada Port are the two railway stations serving the rail needs of the city. Kakinada Town is classified as an A–category station in Vijayawada railway division. It is recognised as one of the Adarsh stations of the division in South Coast Railway zone.

SCR operates its carriage and Wagon depot which is one of the medium-sized depots in Vijayawada division. It's the second station after Vijayawada Junction railway station to have Intermediate Overhauling IOH shed for all types of coaches.

=== Waterways ===
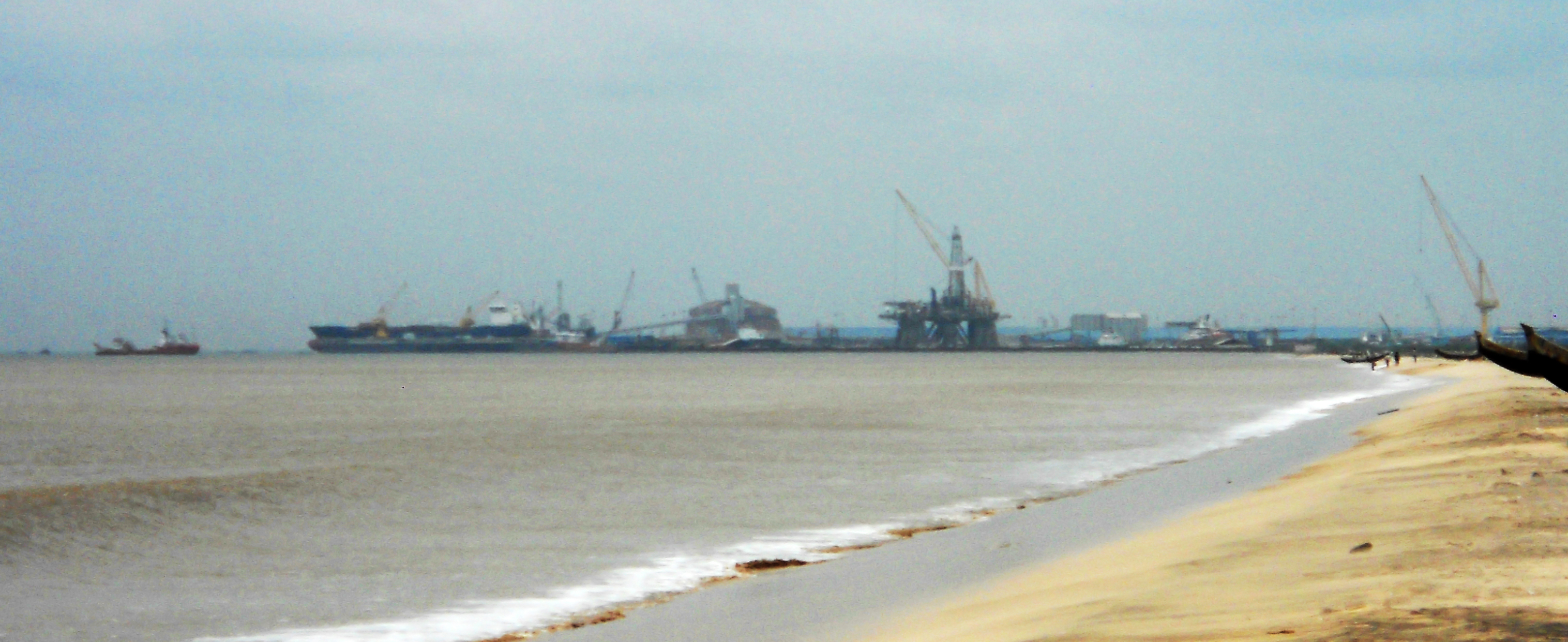
Far view of Kakinada port from Beach

Kakinada Port is located on the shore of Bay of Bengal. It is one of the intermediate ports in the state. The National Waterway 4 connects Kakinada with Puducherry and was declared in 2008 as National Waterway by the Inland Waterways Authority of India for cargo transport and tourism.

=== Airways ===
The nearest airport is Rajahmundry Airport which is 55 km from the city. Reliance Industries Ltd (RIL) operates an Aerodrome at Gadimoga in the city. Cocanada was a stop by Francesco de Pinedo of the Regia Aeronautica and his mechanic, Ernesto Campanelli, during Pinedo's 1925 Rome- Australia-Tokyo-Rome flight.

== Education ==
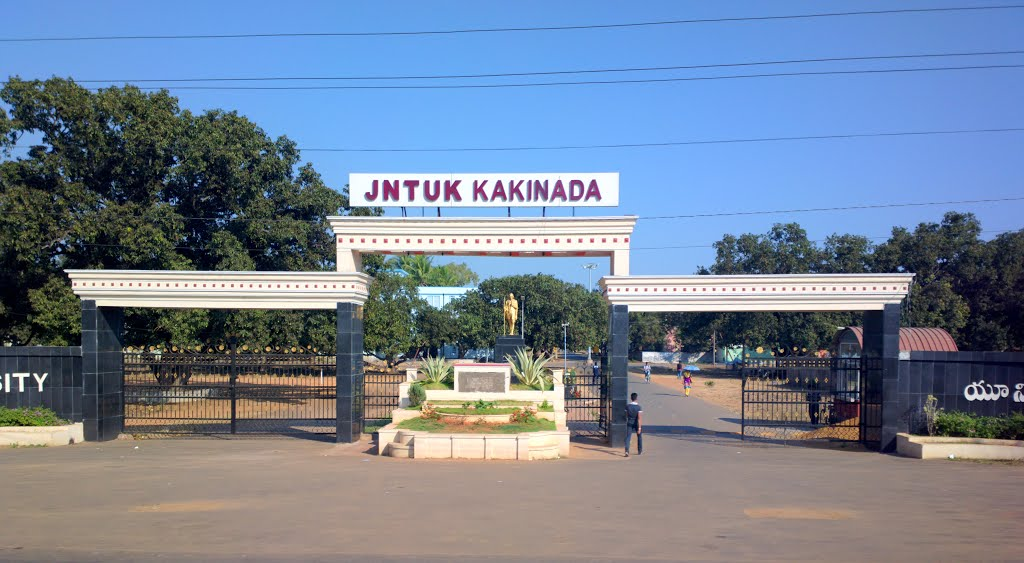
One of the entrance gates of JNTU, Kakinada

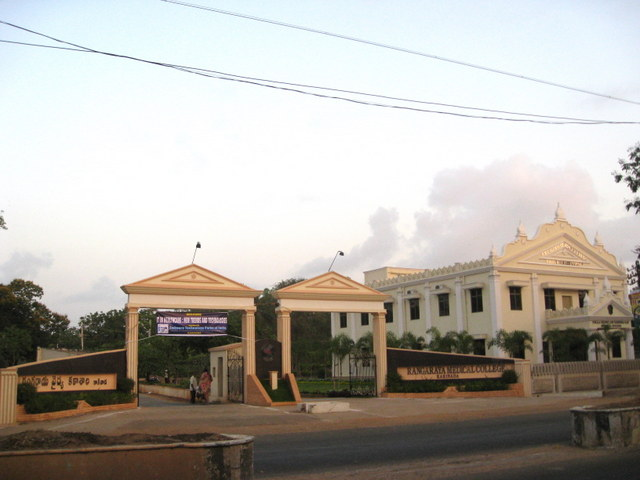
Entrance of Rangaraya Medical College

Kakinada, known as an educational hub in Andhra Pradesh, provides a wide range of primary, secondary, and higher education options. Primary and secondary education in the city is offered by government, aided, and private schools under the School Education Department of Andhra Pradesh, with instruction available in both English and Telugu.

The city and its surrounding areas are home to numerous professional institutions offering courses in fields such as engineering, medicine, information technology, and management at both undergraduate and postgraduate levels. Among these institutions, Jawaharlal Nehru Technological University, Kakinada (JNTU Kakinada), stands out. Originally established as Vishakapatnam College of Engineering on former military land, it offers a variety of engineering programs and includes a business school.

Rangaraya Medical College, established in 1958 by Dr. M. V. Krishna Rao and Dr. Datla Satyanarayana Raju, is another prominent institution in the city. Initially supported by donations, including land and financial contributions from various benefactors, the college became a fully government-run institution by 1981. The Government General Hospital, Kakinada serves as its teaching hospital.

The Andhra University Postgraduate Centre, founded in 1977, provides higher education in Kakinada. It is located on a 50.93-acre (20.61 ha) campus in Thimmapuram, approximately six kilometers from Kakinada Town Railway Station. Andhra Polytechnic, the first polytechnic college in Andhra Pradesh, was established in 1946 by the British Indian government on land donated by M. S. N. Charities in Jagannaickpur.

In recent years, Kakinada's educational landscape has expanded with the establishment of the Indian Institute of Foreign Trade (IIFT), inaugurated by the Ministry of Commerce and Industry, making it the third IIFT campus in the country, after Delhi and Kolkata.

Additionally, the city is home to several other prominent institutions, including P. R. Government College and Ideal College of Arts and Sciences, offering undergraduate and postgraduate courses. The National Institute of Technology, Andhra Pradesh, located in Tadepalligudem, is also situated 80 kilometres from Kakinada, further strengthening the region’s reputation as an educational center.

== Tourism ==
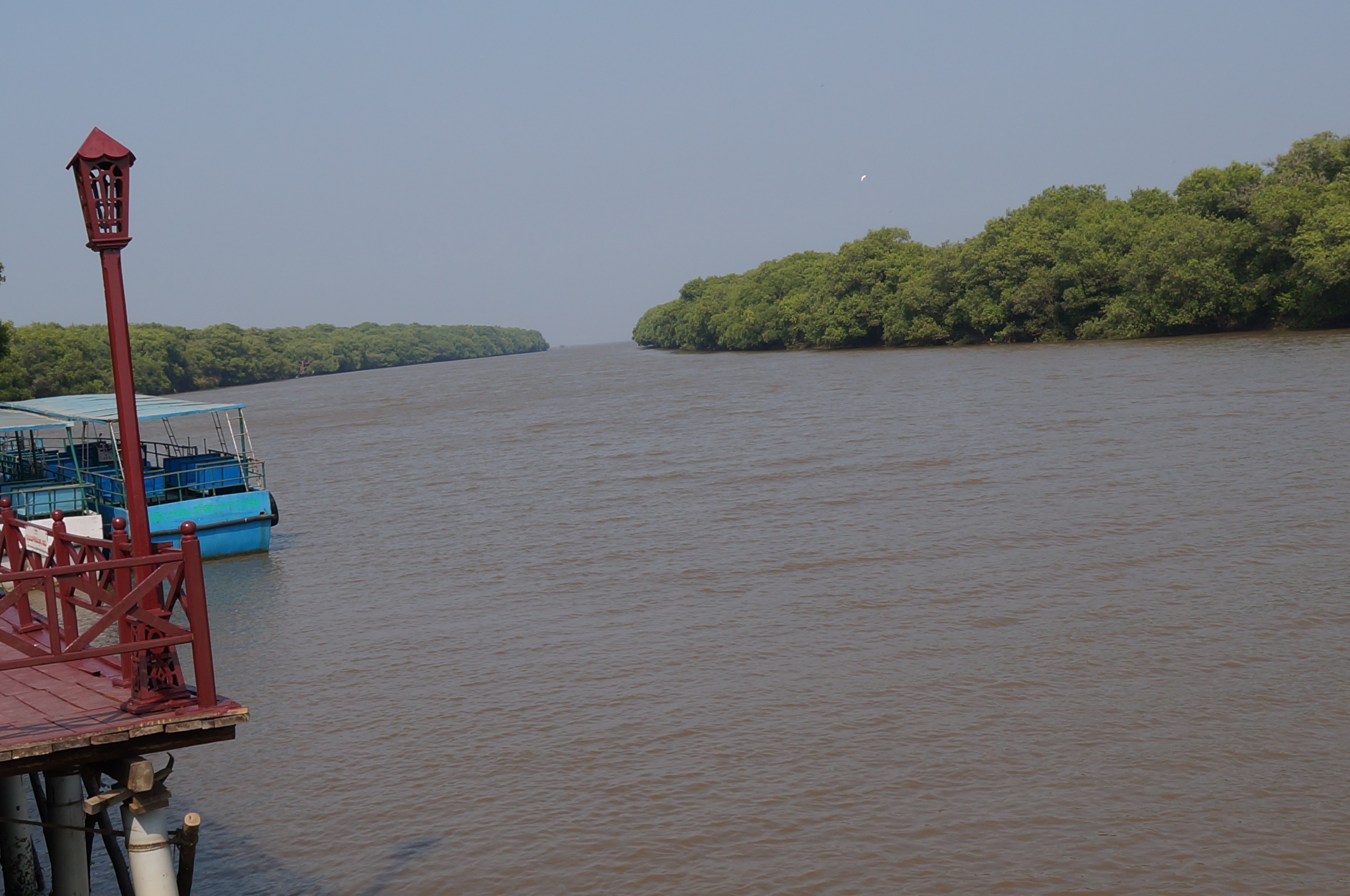
Coringa wildlife sanctuary

Coringa Wildlife Sanctuary, part of the Godavari delta, Hope Island, India, a sandspit formed by the Godavari, Konaseema, scenic Godavari delta islands. It is the second-largest mangrove forest in India after Sundarbans. Uppada beach is primarily considered as Kakinada beach which is having one of longest coastlines in Indian beaches. Kakinada beach is meant for its mild blue waters and cold breeze all the day.

Bhavanarayana Swamy temple in Sarpavaram in Kakinada suburbs is a historic temple renowned for its mythological significance, intricate architecture, and historical inscriptions dating back to various dynasties. It is recognized as one of the State Protected Monuments by the Archaeological Survey of India (ASI) in Andhra Pradesh. The Bala Tripura Sundari Devi Temple is a famous temple located within the city. The temples of Suryanarayana Swami and Kodandarama are located at G. Mamidada which is 20 km from the city.

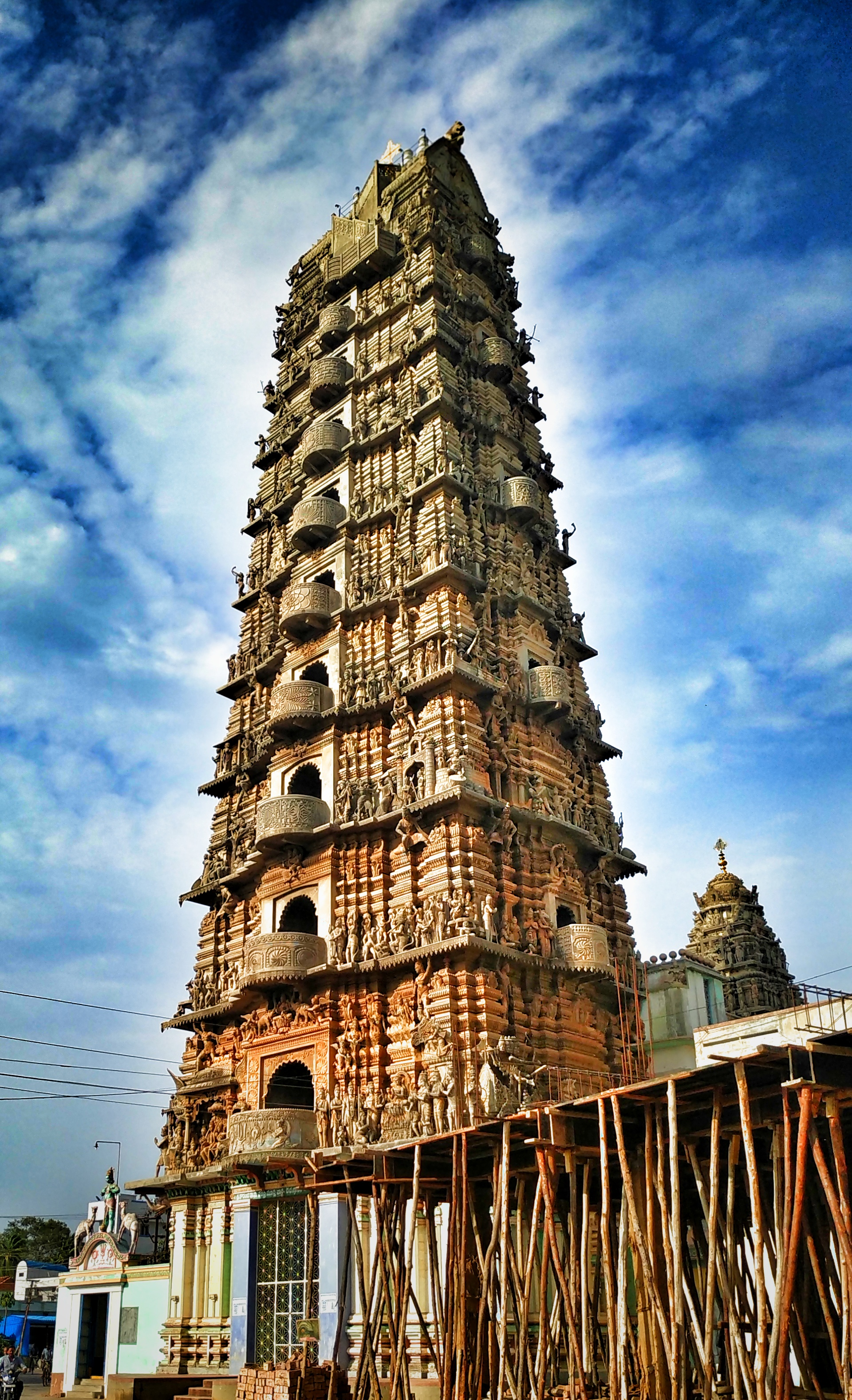
kodanda rama temple, G mamidada

== Sports ==
Cricket is the most popular game in the city, followed by badminton and athletics. Kakinada is home to a number of local cricket teams participating in district and zone matches, with a stadium used for Ranji Trophy matches. The East Godavari District Sports Authority has a sports complex in the city with an indoor stadium and swimming pool. Indian international Hanuma Vihari hails from Kakinada.

Tennis is taught to students by the KTA (Kakinada Tennis Academy) at the tennis courts of Rangaraya Medical College There is a roller-skating rink in Vivekananda Park.

== See also ==
- List of cities in Andhra Pradesh by population
- List of municipal corporations in Andhra Pradesh
