= Kakinada Municipal Corporation =

Local civic body in Kakinada, Andhra Pradesh, India

Kakinada Municipal Corporation కాకినాడ నగర పాలక సంస్థ
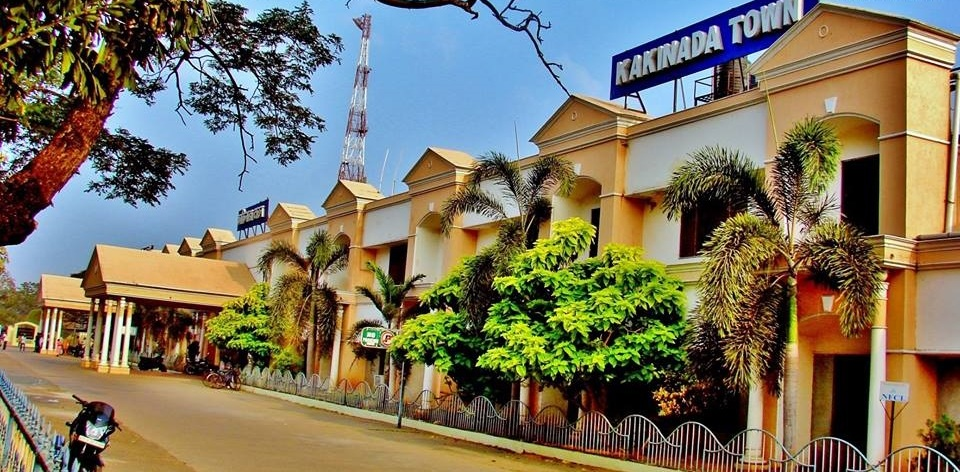

Type
- Type: Municipal Corporation of the Kakinada

History
- Founded: 2005

Leadership
- Special Officer: Krithika Shukla (IAS), Kakinada District.
- Commissioner: K. Ramesh

Elections
- Last election: 29 August 2017
- Next election: to be announced

Website
- Kakinada Municipal corporation

Kakinada Municipal Corporation (KMC) is the civic body of Kakinada in the Indian state of Andhra Pradesh. The corporation has recently concluded its election term and is currently headed by the Special Officer, Krithika Shukla who happens to be the collector of Kakinada District.

== Jurisdiction ==
The jurisdiction of the corporation is spread over an area of 30.51 km^{2} (11.78 sq mi) and the population as per the 2011 Census of India was 312,538. It started to expand from 1920, when it was only 20.31 km^{2} (7.84 sq mi) and the population was just over 50,000. The urban agglomeration area of Kakinada is spread over an area of 57.36 km^{2} (22.15 sq mi). The urban agglomeration constituents includes the areas of Kakinada Municipal Corporation, census towns of Chidiga, Ramanayyapeta, Suryaraopeta and the out growths of Ganganapalle, Sarpavaram, Vakalapudi and Turangi.

== List of mayors ==
Kakinada Municipal Corporation (KMC)
Sno.	Mayor	DY Mayor	Term start	Term end	Party	Notes
1.	Polasapalli Saroja Cherian		2005	2010	Indian National Congress	First Mayor of KMC
2.	Sunkara Pavani	K.Sattibabu	2017	2021	Telugu Desam Party	
2.	Sunkara Sivaprasanna	C.V.Satyaprasad	2021	2022	YSR Congress Party	

== Administration ==
The corporation is administered by special officer, headed by the collector sri shanmoh sagili.

The present commissioner of the corporation is Kum Bhawna IAS, took charge as Commissioner on 24/07/2024

== Functions ==
Kakinada Municipal Corporation is created for the following functions:

- Planning for the town including its surroundings which are covered under its Department's Urban Planning Authority .
- Approving construction of new buildings and authorising use of land for various purposes.
- Improvement of the town's economic and Social status.
- Arrangements of water supply towards commercial, residential and industrial purposes.
- Planning for fire contingencies through Fire Service Departments.
- Creation of solid waste management, public health system and sanitary services.
- Working for the development of ecological aspect like development of Urban Forestry and making guidelines for environmental protection.
- Working for the development of weaker sections of the society like mentally and physically handicapped, old age and gender biased people.
- Making efforts for improvement of slums and poverty removal in the town.

== Revenue sources ==
The following are the Income sources for the Corporation from the Central and State Government.

=== Revenue from taxes ===
Following is the Tax related revenue for the corporation.

- Property tax.
- Profession tax.
- Entertainment tax.
- Grants from Central and State Government like Goods and Services Tax.
- Advertisement tax.

=== Revenue from non-tax sources ===
Following is the Non Tax related revenue for the corporation.

- Water usage charges.
- Fees from Documentation services.
- Rent received from municipal property.
- Funds from municipal bonds.
