= 2017 Kakinada Municipal Corporation election =

2017 election in Kakinada

- 29 August 2017

All 48 elected seats in the Kakinada Municipal Corporation 25 seats needed for a majority
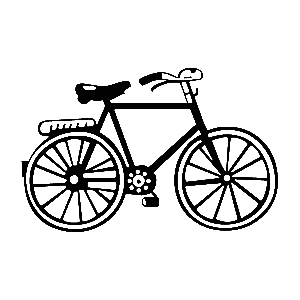

	First party	Second party	Third party
Party	TDP	YSRCP	BJP
Seats won	35	10	3
Elected Mayor
Sunkara Pavani
TDP

The 2017 Kakinada Municipal Corporation election was held on 10 August 2017. Its purpose was to elect members for all 48 wards of the municipal corporation for this municipality in India. After three decades of running, the Telugu Desam Party won the election, securing 32 of the 48 seats.

== Election schedule ==
Date	Event
7 August 2017	Opening for filing Nominations
10 August 2017	Last Date for filing Nominations
11 August 2017	The nominations were scrutinized
12 August 2017	Opening date for candidates to withdrawal
13 August 2017	Last date for voluntary withdrawals and publication of contesting candidates
29 August 2017	Poll took place
1 September 2017	Counting took place and the TDP won
16 September 2017	Sunkara Pavani was elected mayor
