= Hope Island (India) =

Island in India

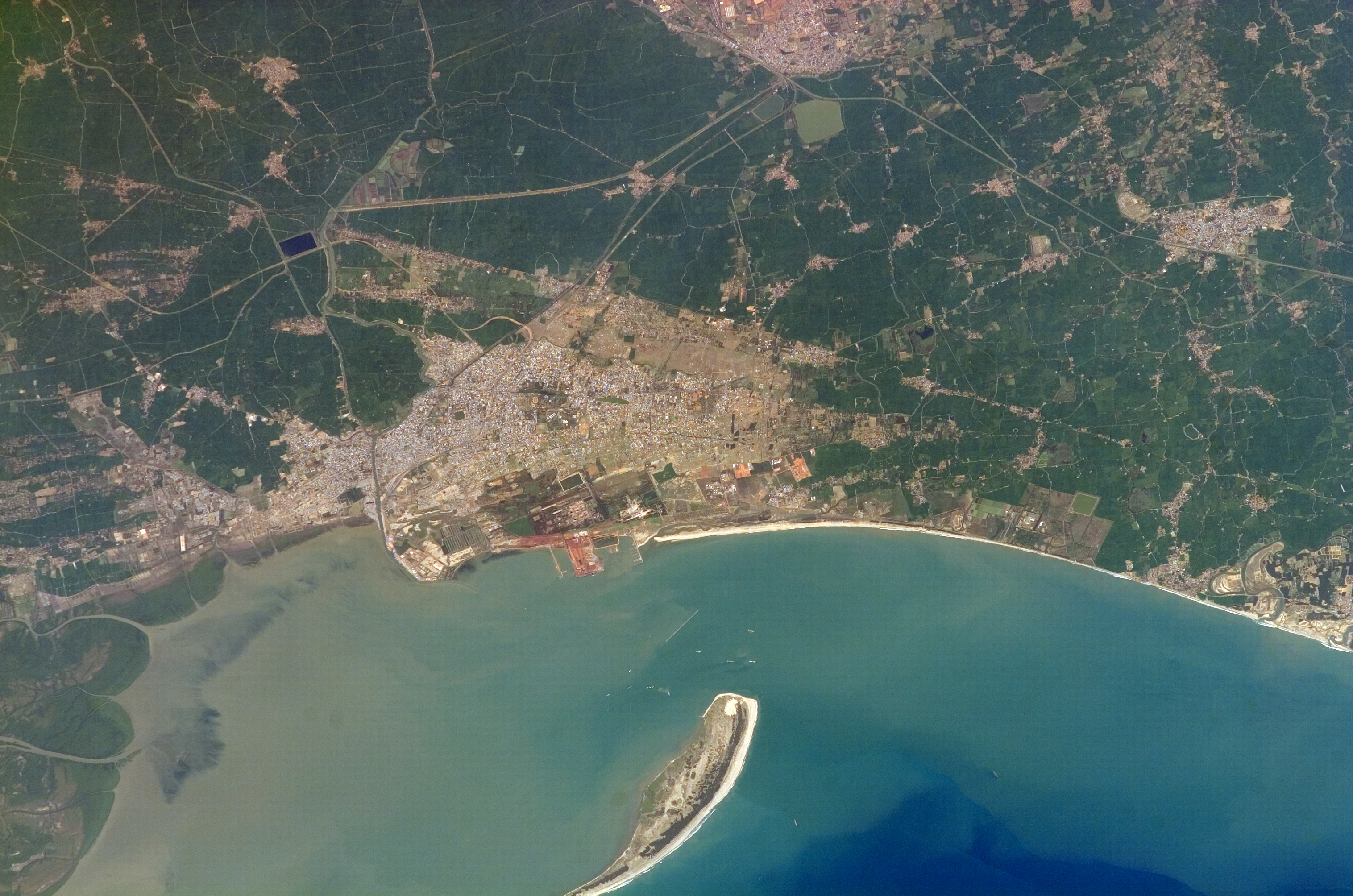
- Satellite image of Hope Island and Kakinada coast
- Interactive map of Hope Island

Geography
- Location: Bay of Bengal
- Coordinates: 16°58′38.5″N 82°20′34.5″E
- Adjacent to: Kakinada Bay, Bay of Bengal
- Area: 8.04 km^{2} (3.10 sq mi)
- Length: 16.2 km (10.07 mi)

Administration
- India
- State: Andhra Pradesh
- District: Kakinada district

Additional information
- Time zone: IST (UTC+05:30)

Hope Island (Krachchu Lanka) is a small tadpole shaped Island situated off the coast of Andhra Pradesh near Kakinada, India, in the Bay of Bengal.

== Geography ==
Hope Island (Krachchu Lanka) is located at 16.977°N 82.343°E.

A relatively young island, it formed in the late 18th century, from the sediment outflow carried by the waters of the Koringa River, a distributary of the Godavari. The small bay it encloses is the outflow basin of the Koringa, the northernmost distributary of the Godavari. The sand bars formed have gained permanence due to successive deposition of sand and alluvial silt due to meeting of the low salinity waters of the river meeting the saline waters of the Bay of Bengal.

The area between Kakinada coast and Hope Island is known as Kakinada Bay, enclosing an area of around 146 km^{2} (56 mi^{2}). Hope Island protects the city of Kakinada from the strong storm surges coming from the Bay of Bengal. Hope Island(Krachchu Lanka) acts as natural barrier for storm surges and possible tsunami events and provides tranquility to the ships anchored in Kakinada Bay which makes Kakinada Port one of the safest natural ports in the eastern coast of India.

The northern tip of the island is called "Godavari Point", which overlooks the entry point into the Kakinada Bay and the Kakinada harbour. Indian armed forces are using this island for beaching practice very often. Indian Navy landing craft War ships are conducting exercises for Marcos and special forces.

== Marine habitat ==
The sandy beaches of Hope island(Krachchu Lanka) along with the adjacent Coringa Wildlife Sanctuary are a nesting ground of the vulnerable olive ridley turtle, with 482 females laying eggs on the beaches of Hope Island(Krachchu Lanka) in 2016. In recent years hundreds of dead turtles have also washed up on the beaches due to injuries from mechanized fishing boats operating off the Andhra coast. Conservationists, wildlife and forest officials have raised concern regarding the mechanized fishing, and conducted sensitization programs and retro-fitting with "turtle excluder devices" to prevent injuries to the endangered reptiles.

== Population ==
Hope Island(Krachchu Lanka) houses two small hamlets of fisher folk, named Putrayya Pakalu and Sorlagondu Pakalu housing about 400 families. There are also a few government buildings. The Kakinada Port authorities have conducted dredging activities in the bay in an effort to keep port activities, which has aggravated the erosion loss of land on Hope Island(Krachchu Lanka). Erosion due to tidal and storm surges during the cyclone season are also issues as reported by the local fisher folk - who report that erosion has bifurcated the island into two with a 50-meter wide channel.
