= Baru Alivelamma =

Indian independence activist

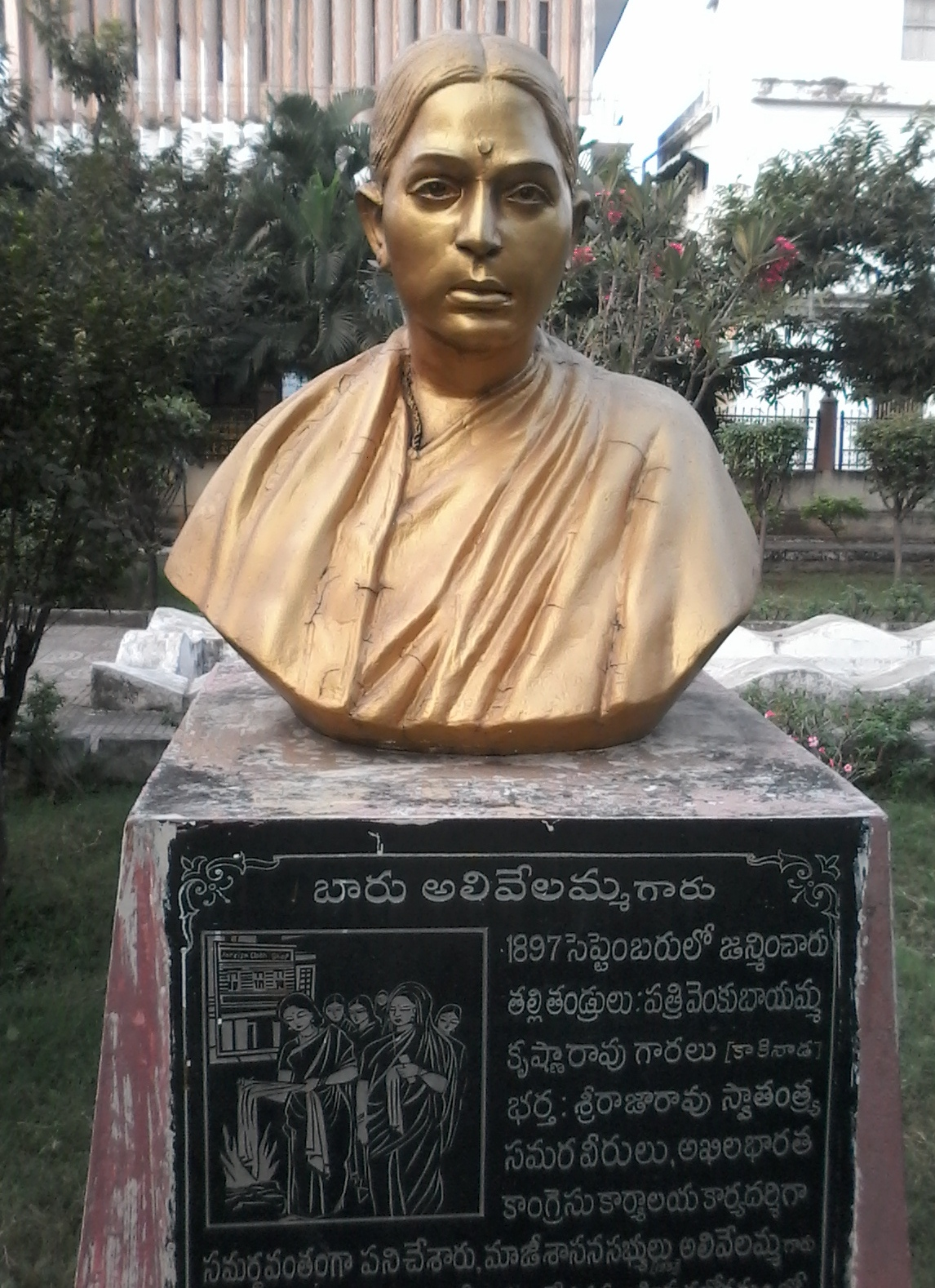
- Bust of Baru Alivelamma in Rajahmundry
- Born: September 1895; Kakinada, Andhra Pradesh, India
- Died: 13 November 1973 (aged 78); Rajahmundry, Andhra Pradesh, India
- Monuments: Rajahmundry Freedom Fighters Park
- Political party: Indian National Congress
- Spouse: Baru Raja Rao

Baru Alivelamma (1895–1973) was a prominent freedom fighter in India during the Indian independence movement.

== Biography ==
Baru Alivelamma was born in September 1895 in Kakinada, India, to father Patri Krishna Rao and mother Sri Patri Venkubayamma.

Alivelamma married fellow freedom fighter Baru Raja Rao, who served as secretary of the All India Congress Committee for nearly two decades from 1917 to 1935. They had two sons and three daughters, many of whom also became heavily involved in Indian independence. Their daughter Sesha and son Venkata Govinda Rao were particularly involved. Vekata Govinda Rao Baru, as he was popularly known, joined the youth wing of the fight for freedom when he was only 9, and was subsequently disbarred from his high school several years later for his involvement in student movements.

Baru Alivelamma died on 13 November 1973, in Rajahmundry, Andhra Pradesh.

== Political views ==
Baru Alivelamma, inspired by her husband's involvement in the movement, officially joined the fight for Indian independence in the 1920s. For several years following her husband's work in congress, the pair lived together in the presence of Mahatma Gandhi at his ashram in Sevagram.

In 1930, alongside activist Kamala Nehru, Alivelamma led a mass boycott of foreign clothes and liquor in Allahabad, present-day Prayagraj. She was punished harshly for her involvement and spent the next several years in numerous jails, including Yerrawada Central Jail and Sabarmati Central Jail.

== Recognition ==
A statue of Baru Alivelamma stands in Rajahmundry Freedom Fighters Park amongst a collection of monuments honoring twelve of the women who fought for swaraj, or Indian self governance. The statues were unveiled on 3 February 2002, as part of a birthday celebration honoring Durgabai Deshmukh, following a community survey to select the honorees. The twelve women who were selected had all been imprisoned during the fight for freedom, as Durgabai herself had been repeatedly incarcerated. In addition to Baru Alivelamma and Durgabai Deshmukh, Freedom Fighters Park honors women like Duvvuri Subbamma, Gujju Nagaratnamma, Palakodeti Syamalamba, and Tallapragada Vishwa Sundaramma. In a nearby section of the park, statues honor Mahatma Gandhi, Tanguturi Prakasam Pantulu, Garimella Satyanarayana, Chilakamarthi Lakshmi Narasimham and N. Subba Rao Pantulu.
