= Kakinada Port =

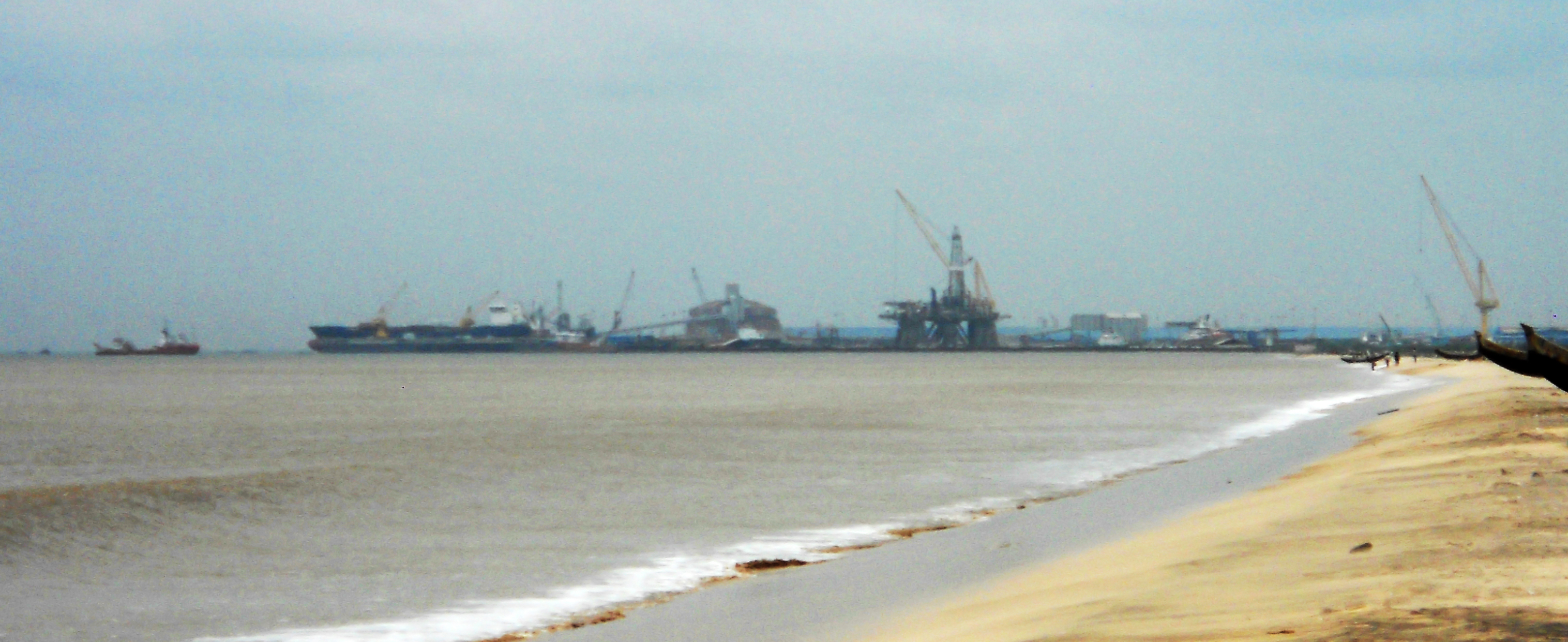
- View of Kakinada port from the Beach
- Interactive map of Kakinada Port

Location
- Country: India
- Location: Andhra Pradesh
- Coordinates: 16°58′30″N 82°16′44″E

Details
- Opened: 1st April 1999
- No. of berths: 4 + 2 (under construction)

Statistics
- Annual cargo tonnage: 14.50 million tonnes(2016-17)
- Website www.kakinadaseaports.in

Kakinada Port is located at Kakinada off the east coast of India. It is 170 km (106 mi) south of Visakhapatnam Port.

Kakinada Port is a large complex comprising Kakinada Anchorage Port, Kakinada Deep Water Port, Kakinada Fishing Harbour and Ship-Breaking Unit. Kakinada Anchorage Port has a century-long tradition.

Kakinada Deep Water Port is an all-weather deep water port, and the channel has a depth of 12 metres (39 ft). The port can handle vessels up to 50,000 DWT. The port handled 10.81 million tonnes of cargo in 2010–2011. The AP Govt developed Kakinada beach in 2013 and it has 100 acres of land covered from port to Uppada area.

New Kakinada Port railway station was opened in 2011.

A new port named, Kakinada Gateway port is underconstruction in Kakinada district, This will be the third port in Kakinada district, with a proposed cargo handling capacity of 16 million tonnes of cargo.

== History ==
Kakinada (then known as Cocanada) was a significant port in the Godavari district during the British colonial period. In early 20th century, it served as a crucial centre for trade, facilitating commerce within the district, its neighboring regions to the north and south, and an extensive hinterland that included parts of the Nizam's Dominions.

By 1915, the port had two operational lighthouses at Vakalapudi and the Sacramento Shoal, with earlier lighthouses at Cocanada and Hope Island decommissioned. The port was managed by the Cocanada Port Conservancy Board, chaired by the district Collector. The board maintained port infrastructure, including dredgers and groins, using funds from landing and shipping dues, as well as rents collected within port limits. Despite efforts to control silt deposition, the harbour faced challenges from sediment inflow from the Godavari River and a northern drainage creek.

Cocanada’s port activities attracted a number of vessels, including British India Steam Navigation Company steamers, which made six to seven calls weekly, Asiatic Steam Navigation Company boats, Clan Line steamers, and occasional ships from Austrian Lloyd and Venetian companies. The export of rice and cheroots formed a significant part of the trade conducted at the port.

== See also ==
- Kakinada City
- Hope Island
