= Coringa Wildlife Sanctuary =

Sanctuary in Andhra Pradesh, India

- IUCN category IV (habitat/species management area)
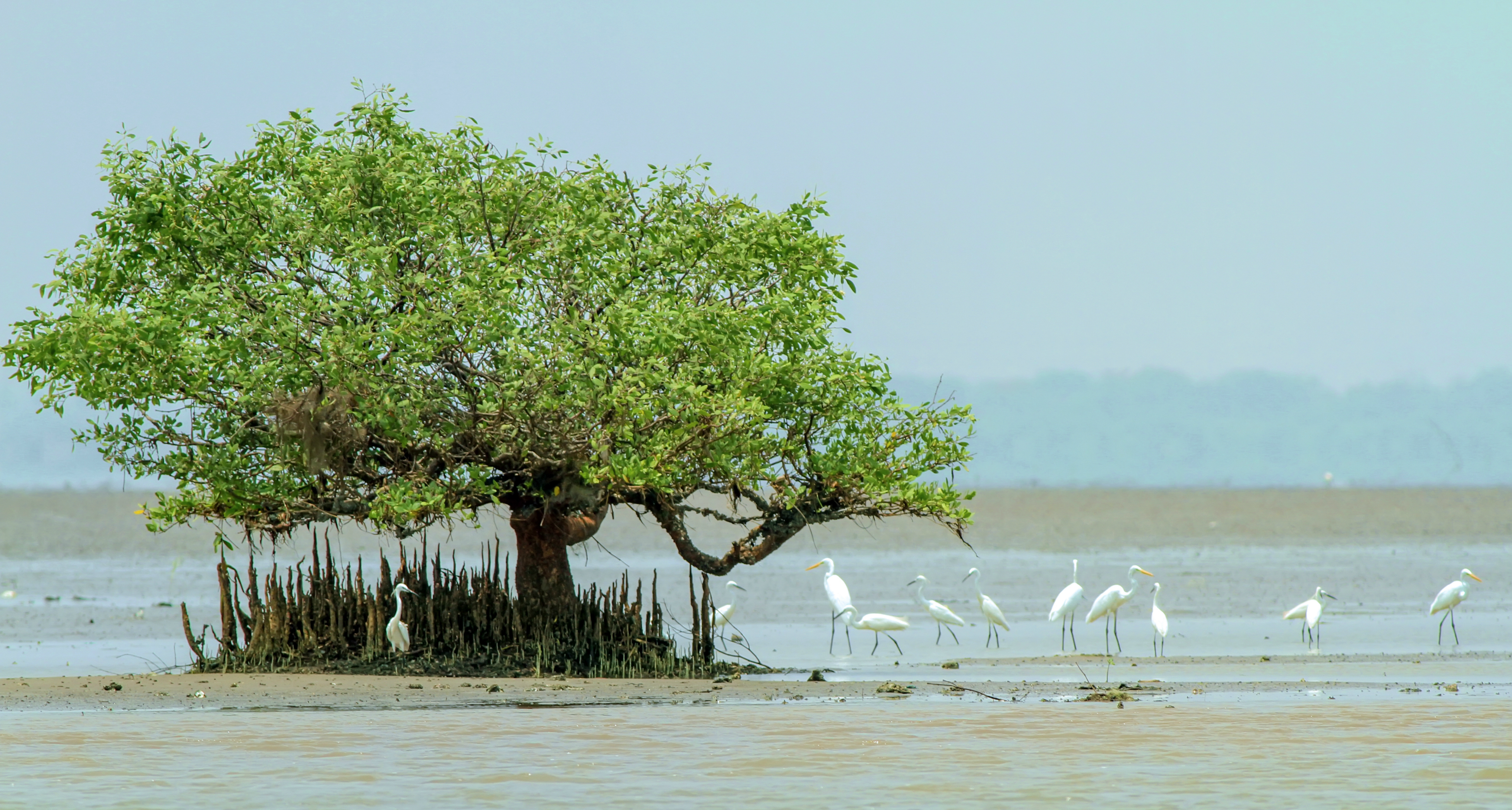
- The Godavari Estuary in Coringa Wildlife Sanctuary

- Location within Andhra Pradesh Location within India
- Interactive map of Coringa Wildlife Sanctuary
- Location: Andhra Pradesh, India
- Nearest city: Kakinada
- Coordinates: 16°49′53″N 82°20′12″E
- Area: 235.7 km^{2} (91.0 sq mi)
- Established: 5 July 1978
- Governing body: Andhra Pradesh Forest Department
- Website: coringasanctuary.com

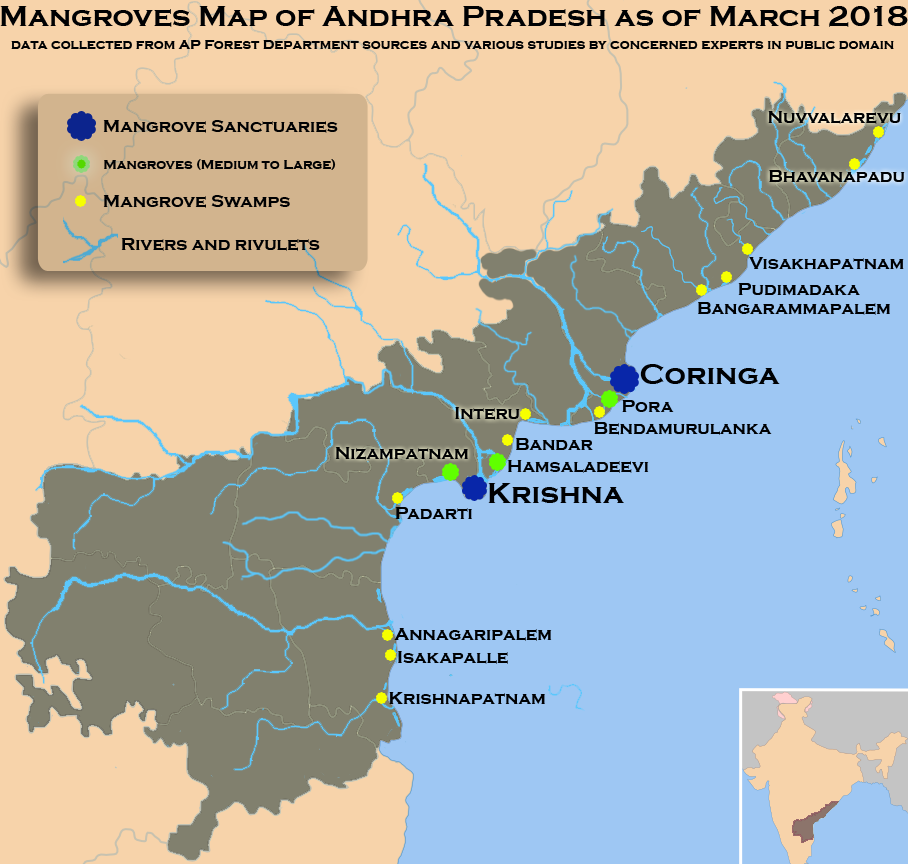
Map of Mangroves in Andhra Pradesh

Coringa Wildlife Sanctuary is an estuary situated near Kakinada in Andhra Pradesh, India. It is the third largest stretch of mangrove forests in India with 24 mangrove tree species and more than 120 bird species. It is home to the critically endangered white-backed vulture and the long billed vulture. Mangroves are a group of trees and shrubs that live in the coastal intertidal zone, with a dense tangle of prop roots that make the trees appear to be standing on stilts above the water. This tangle of roots allows the trees to handle the daily rise and fall of tides; hence, the mangrove forest gets flooded at least twice per day. The roots also slow the movement of tidal waters, causing sediments to settle out of the water and build up the muddy bottom.

It also protects the coastline, reducing erosion from storm surges, currents, waves, and tides. The complex root system of the mangrove also makes the forest attractive to fish and other organisms seeking food and shelter from predators.

== Geography ==
Coringa Wildlife Sanctuary is 8 km from the port city of Kakinada, on the Kakinada-Yanam National Highway 216 in Chollangi Village, nestling on the deltaic branches of Gouthami and Godavari Rivers at Kakinada Bay.

It is located between 16°-30' to 17°-00' N latitudes and 82°-14' to 82°-23'E longitudes.

The sanctuary is a part of the Godavari estuary and has extensive mangrove and dry deciduous tropical forest.

About half of the area is the backwater, which includes a sand pit of 18 km length. The rivers Coringa and Gaderu and their deltaic branches intersect the region, along with other water channels. This forms about 335.7 square kilometres (129.6 sq mi) of marsh vegetation.

The average temperature of the region is 17–40 °C (63–104 °F).

Average rainfall is greater than 1,000 mm.

== Flora ==
The Sanctuary in the estuary of River Godavari has rich mangrove vegetation. There are thirty five species of plants belonging to twenty four families. The plant species that are commonly found are:

- Avicennia officinalis
- Avicennia marina
- Avicennia alba
- Excoecaria agallocha
- Rhizophora mucronata
- Ceriops decandra
- Bruguiera gymnorhiza
- Lumnitzera recemosa
- Sonneratia apetala
- Rhizophora conjugata
- Aegiceras corniculatum
- Thespesia populneoides
- Hibiscus tiliaceus.

Apart from the tree species, some of the shrubs found in the sanctuary are:

- Dalbergia spinosa
- Derris trifoliata.

Herbs like:

- Sesuvium portulacastrum
- Suaeda maritima
- Suaeda monoica
- Salicornia brachiatta

and grasses like:

- Aeluropus lagopoides
- Porteresia coarctate
- Myriostachya wightiana

are found in the sanctuary.

== Fauna ==
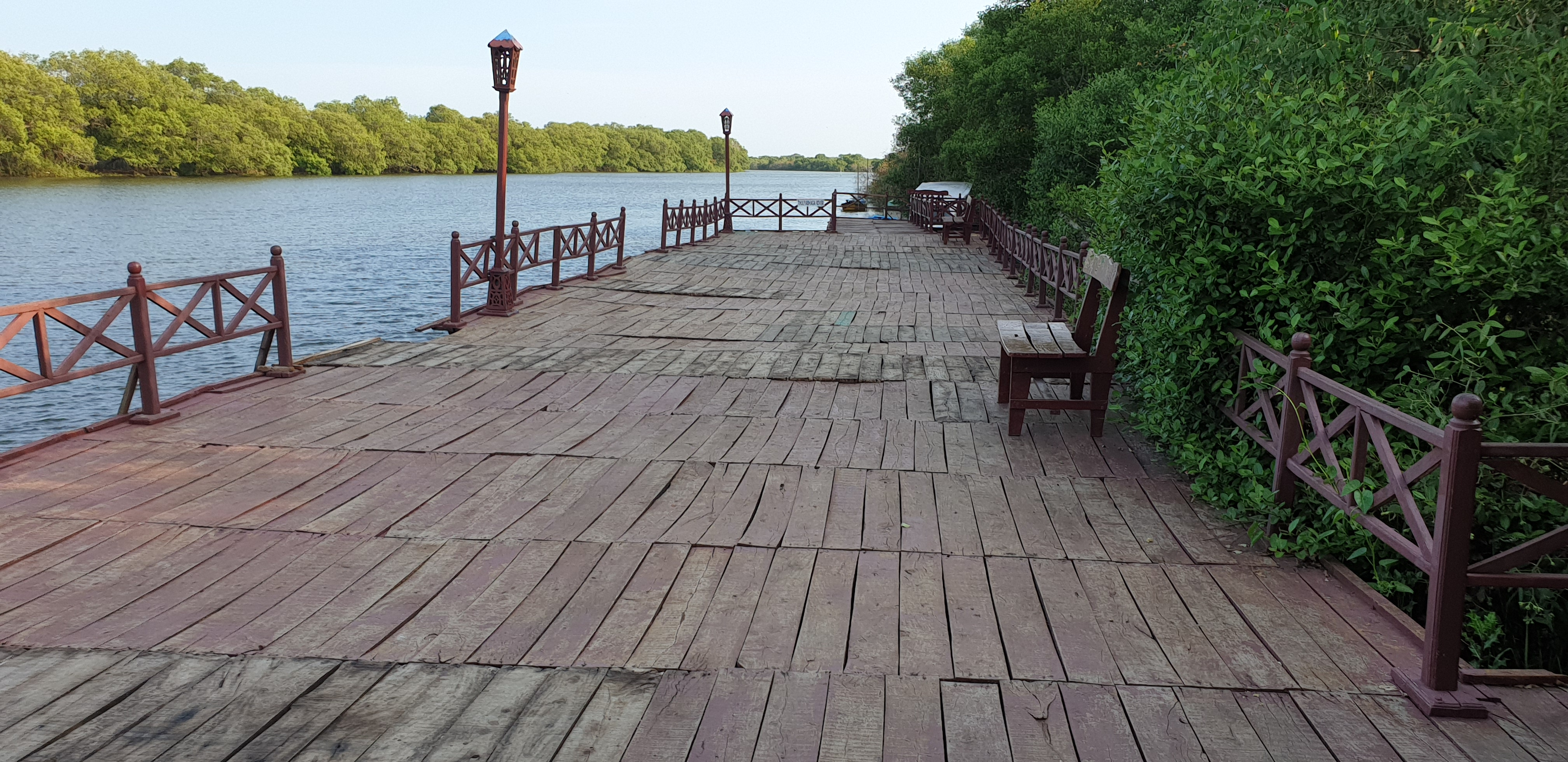
Riverfront development along Koringa river

The sanctuary possesses a wide variety of birds, because of the feed available in the backwaters of the mangrove forest. During low tide, some of the areas are exposed (elevated mud flats) having small fishes, shrimps and mollusks. These attract avifauna for feeding. Some critically endangered species like the white-backed vulture and the long billed vulture are present in the sanctuary. The painted stork, Oriental white ibis, ferruginous pochard found in the sanctuary are near threatened species, and spot-billed pelican is a vulnerable species. Significant populations of waders and mangrove birds are also present. Altogether, more than 120 species of birds have been reported and among them some of the commonly found birds in the sanctuary are:

- little egret
- cattle egret
- pied kingfisher
- small blue kingfisher
- black-capped kingfisher
- pond heron
- reef heron
- grey heron
- night heron
- little stint
- sandpiper
- redshank
- red-wattled lapwing
- crow pheasant
- flamingos
- sea gulls
- purple heron
- brahmini kite
- openbill stork
- little cormorant.

Apart from the avian fauna, the sanctuary has a fair population of golden jackal, sea turtle and fishing cat, and a healthy breeding population of smooth-coated otter. The sanctuary has an 18-km long sand pit where olive ridley sea turtles nest from January to March every year. Efforts to reintroduce the saltwater crocodile into the sanctuary during the 1970s met with failure and the species has not been present within the sanctuary for over 30 years.

== Threats and conservation issues ==
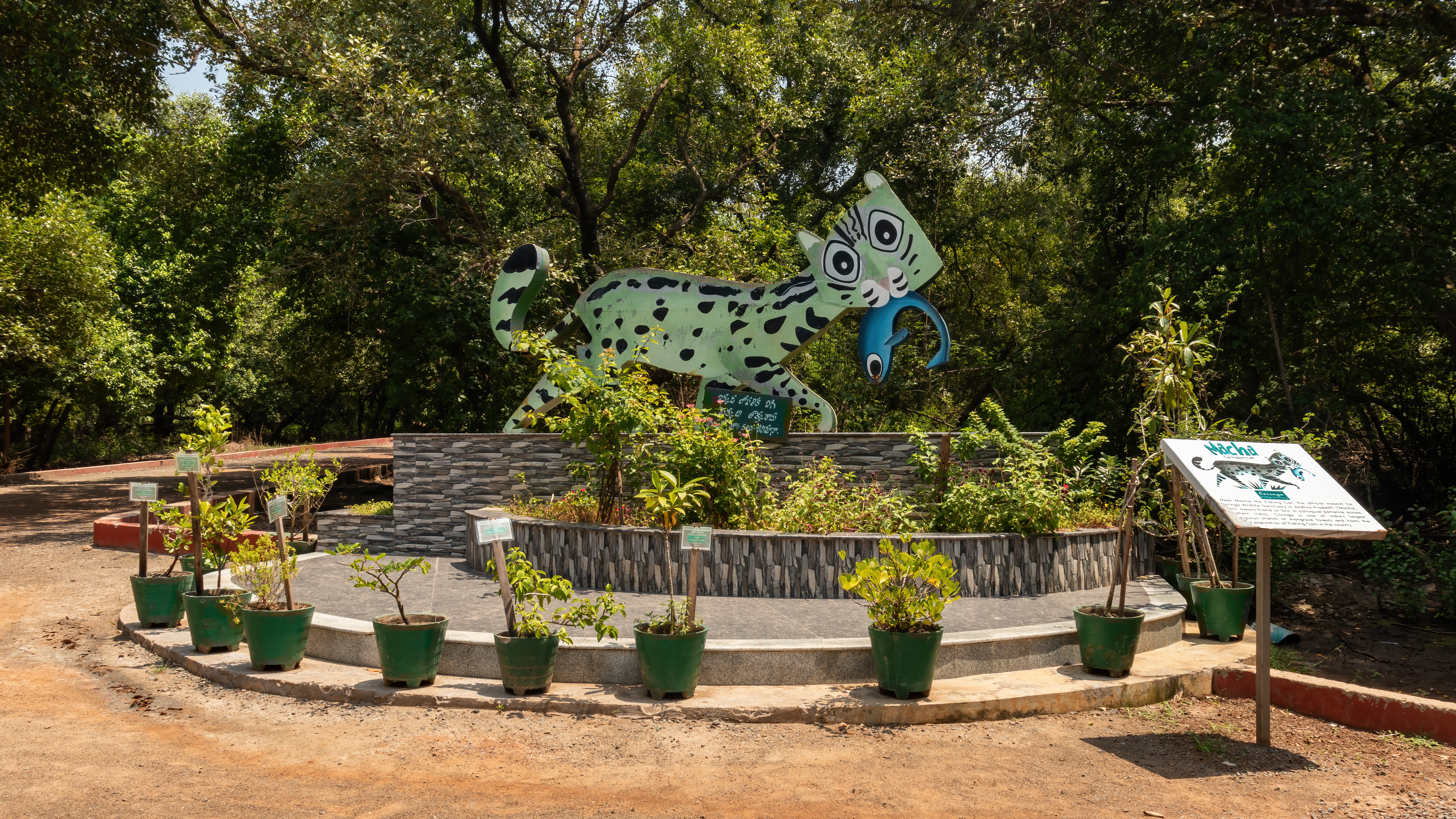
Macha the Fishing cat sculpture in the Reserve

As it is easy to access and in close vicinity to the port town of Kakinada and nearby villages, which are largely inhabited, the mangroves are being exploited by the local population. A socio-economic study by the Indian Bird Conservation Network found that most of the local fishermen harvest wood in the forest and depend heavily on the mangroves for their basic needs. The species Avicennia officinalis and Avicennia marina are being used for fuelwood.

The existence of otters has been hit badly because of increased poaching and habitat destruction. The increasing industrialization of the Godavari Delta, increasing aquaculture activities and fishing pressure have severely affected the population of otters. The Andhra Pradesh Forest Department has taken steps to ensure conservation of otters and for afforestation of mangroves in the sanctuary.
