= Kutikuppala Surya Rao =

Indian physician

- Born: 10 October 1954 (age 72); Kintali, Srikakulam
- Education: Andhra Medical College Visakhapatnam
- Occupations: Physician; Scientist
- Spouse: Smt. Gruhalakshmi
- Children: Kutikuppala Srujana, Kutikuppala Sri Charan, Kutikuppala Sravana
- Parent(s): Kutikuppala Sriramulu, Smt. Sanyasamma
- Website: http://drkutikuppalasuryarao.com/

Kutikuppala Surya Rao is a physician in HIV medicine. He hails from a village named Kintali, located in the Srikakulam district of Andhra Pradesh, India.

== Education ==
Rao did his MBBS from Andhra Medical College, MD family medicine at the Postgraduate Institute of Medicine, University of Colombo, doctoral fellowship in HIV medicine from Christian Medical College, Vellore, and MNAMS from National Academy of Medical Sciences, New Delhi. He got his Ph.D. on "Ethical challenges involved in the treatment of HIV/AIDS" at Andhra University. He is fellow of the Royal College of Physicians–London. Rao has spent most of his medical career in clinical research associated with HIV /AIDS disease

== Awards and recognition ==
1. Guinness World Record holder for creating the largest HIV/AIDs-awareness Red Ribbon.
2. The Padma Shri award from the government of India in recognition of his distinguished contribution to society.
3. The World Health Organization award in 1989.
4. The Mahatma Gandhi Pravasi Samman Award, a rare honour that was presented at the British House of Lords, on 21 September 2015, by Rt Honorable Baroness Verma, Minister of International Development, UK.

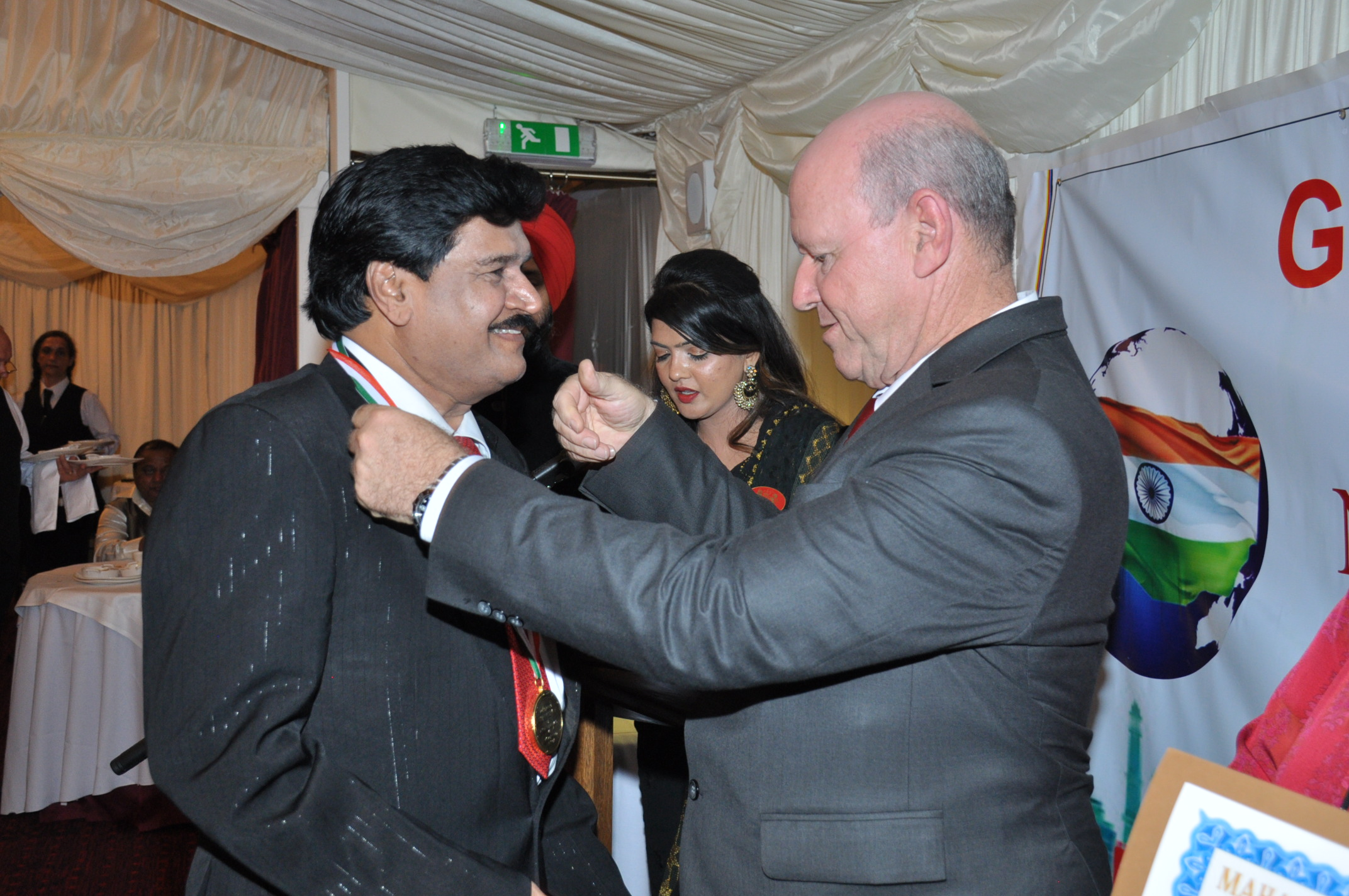
Rao receiving Mahatma Gandhi Pravasi Samman Award at the House of Lords, London

Rao has served as an executive council member of Andhra University, vice-chairman of the Jan Shikshan Sansthan, and a national committee member of the AIDS Control Organisation. He has published research papers in medical journals of national and International repute such as BMJ, Applied Medicine, Antiseptic, Indian Practitioner, JIMA.
