= Suryaraopeta =

- Census Town
- Location in Andhra Pradesh, India
- Coordinates: 16°48′11″N 81°38′31″E
- Country: India
- State: Andhra Pradesh
- District: Kakinada

Area
  - Total: 9.20 km^{2} (3.55 sq mi)

Population (2011)
  - Total: 24,112
  - Density: 2,620/km^{2} (6,790/sq mi)

Languages
  - Official: Telugu
- Time zone: UTC+5:30 (IST)
- Vehicle registration: AP

Suryaraopeta is a census town in Kakinada district of the Indian state of Andhra Pradesh. It is located in Kakinada (rural) mandal of Kakinada revenue division. The town is a constituent of Kakinada urban agglomeration.

== Demographics ==
As of 2001 India census, Suryaraopeta had a population of 19,175. Males constitute 50% of the population and females 50%. Suryaraopeta has an average literacy rate of 76%, higher than the national average of 59.5%: male literacy is 80%, and female literacy is 72%. In Suryaraopeta, 10% of the population is under 6 years of age.

== Education ==
The primary and secondary school education is imparted by government, aided and private schools, under the School Education Department of the state. The medium of instruction followed by different schools are English, Telugu.

== See also ==
- List of census towns in Andhra Pradesh
