= Koringa River =

Koringa
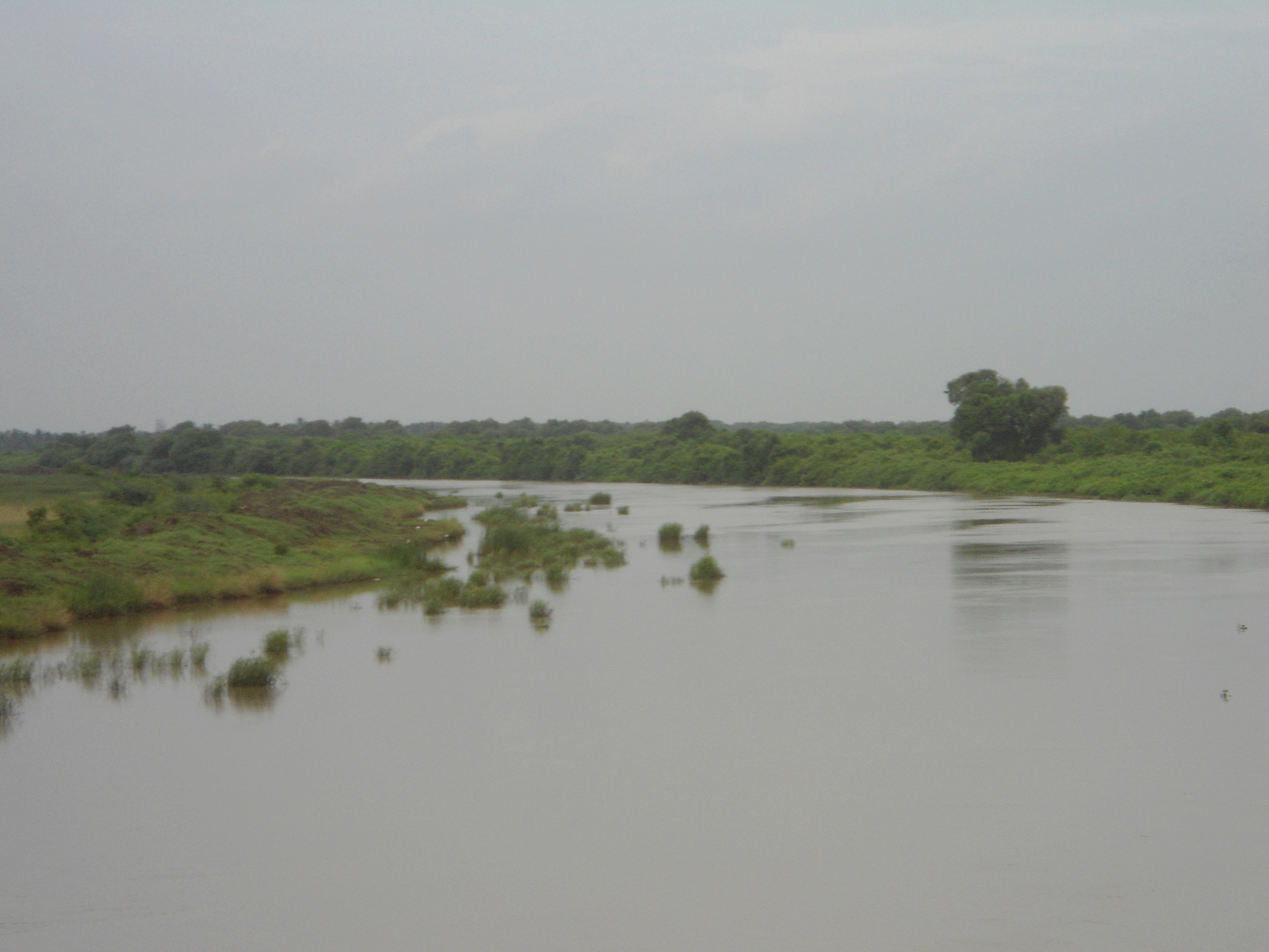
- Koringa River at Tallarevu village during monsoon

Location
- Country: India
- State: Andhra Pradesh
- Region: South India

Koringa (also known as Coringa, Telugu: కోరింగ నది) is a branch of the Godavari River flowing in the East Godavari district, Konaseema district, Kakinada districts of Andhra Pradesh, India.

== History ==
The river was also historically known as the Coringa, Koringa, Corangi, Coringuy.

== Geography ==
The Goutami Godavari is the Eastern branch of the Godavari river, that splits at Vijjeswaram, while the Vasista Godavari is the Western branch. Other main branch is Vainateya, which splits at Dowleswaram. Tulya, Atreya and Bharadwaja are minor tributaries.

== See also ==
- Yanam, Pondicherry
- Godavari River
