= Srungara Vallabha Swamy Temple =

Hindu temple in Andhra Pradesh, India

Sri Srungara Vallabha Swami Temple
- శ్రీ శృంగార వల్లభ స్వామి దేవాలయం
- Location in Andhra Pradesh

Religion
- Affiliation: Hinduism
- District: Kakinada
- Deity: Sri Srungara Vallabha Swami
- Governing body: Sri Srungara Vallabha Swamy Devasthanam

Location
- Location: Tirupati village, Peddapuram Mandal
- State: Andhra Pradesh
- Country: India
- Coordinates: 17°04′59″N 82°05′10″E

Architecture
- Type: Dravidian
- Established: Prior to 12th century

Sri Srungara Vallabha Swami Temple is a historic Hindu temple located in Chadalada Tirupati village (commonly referred to as Tholi Tirupati) in Kakinada district, Andhra Pradesh, India. The temple is dedicated to Sri Srungara Vallabha Swami, a manifestation of Lord Venkateswara (Lord Vishnu), and is notable for its historical and architectural significance.

The presiding deity, Srungara Vallabha Swamy, is depicted in a smiling posture, with the name "Srungara" meaning "beautiful." It is believed that the deity appears in varying sizes depending on the devotee’s stature. The temple also houses the deities Sri Devi and Bhu Devi, and features intricate inscriptions and sculptures. Unlike traditional depictions of Lord Venkateswara, the deity’s Sankha (conch) and Chakra (disc) are positioned differently.

The village is named Tholi Tirupati (meaning "the first Tirupati") as it is believed to be the place where Lord Vishnu first appeared in the form of Srungara Vallabha Swamy. The temple is thought to have originated prior to the 12th century based on the temple inscriptions and is protected by the Archaeological Survey of India (ASI). Local tradition holds that the temple has existed for over 9,000 years which is purely mythological.

The temple attracts a large number of pilgrims, with an estimated 20,000 visitors on Saturdays and around 3,000 on regular days.

== Etymology ==
The name Srungara Vallabha Swamy is derived from the depiction of the presiding deity in a smiling posture, symbolizing Lord Vishnu as Venkateswara Swamy.

The village is also known as Chadalada Tirupati, as it is located near the village of Chadalada.

Additionally, the village is referred to as Tholi Tirupati (meaning "the first Tirupati") due to the belief that it is the site where Lord Vishnu first appeared in the form of Srungara Vallabha Swamy. Local tradition holds that this temple predates the Venkateswara temple at Tirumala.

== Location ==
The Srungara Vallabha Swamy Temple is located in Chadalada Tirupati, popularly known as Tholi Tirupati, near Divili.

The temple is located approximately 15 km from Samarlakota Railway Station and 31 km from Kakinada, accessible via the Kirlampudi-Prathipadu road. It is situated to the north of Tirupati village, bordered by Divili to the east, Jaggampeta to the west, Kirlampudi to the north, and Peddapuram to the south. The Eleru Canal flows south of the village, while the temple is located west of the main road. The temple complex occupies a 75-cent plot of land.

== History ==
The Sri Srungara Vallabharaya Swami Temple was constructed prior to 12th century. Historical records, particularly inscriptions found in the temple, document various land donations made to the temple by local rulers. These inscriptions reflect the socio-political and religious practices of the time. The region, once part of the Prolunadu area, was governed by various dynasties including the Guptas, Satavahanas, Eastern ChalukyasPalli Pallavas,Kakatiyas, and Reddi rulers.

The Eastern Chalukyas, who ruled from the 7th century, significantly influenced the temple's construction and cultural development. Notable rulers like Kubja Vishnuvardhana contributed to the establishment of several temples in the region. Contributions continued under subsequent rulers, including the Chalukya-Cholas,Pallavas,Gajapatis, and the local zamindars of Peddapuram Chalukyas agnikulas.

In 1956, the temple was brought under the management of the Endowments Department to ensure its preservation and continued religious significance.

== Legend (Sthala Puranam) ==
The legend of the Sri Srungara Vallabha Swami Temple is connected to the story of Dhruva, found in the Vishnu Purana and Bhagavata Purana. King Uttanapada had two wives, Sunithi and Suruchi, and two sons: Dhruva, son of Sunithi, and Uttama, son of Suruchi. Suruchi was jealous of Dhruva and wanted her son, Uttama, to become king.

One day, Dhruva, a young child, tried to sit on his father’s lap while Uttama was already there. Suruchi pushed him away, telling him that, since he was not her son, he had no right to sit with the king. Heartbroken, Dhruva went to his mother, who advised him to seek Lord Vishnu’s blessings for strength.

Dhruva then set out to perform severe penance. The sage Narada guided him, advising him to chant "Om Namo Bhagavate Vasudevaya." After six months of austerities, Lord Vishnu appeared before Dhruva. However, Dhruva could not see Vishnu due to his immense size and radiance. To help him, Vishnu assumed a smaller form, allowing Dhruva to see him clearly. Vishnu then blessed Dhruva, granting him the ability to appear in the size that any devotee desired.

Tholi Tirupati is believed to be the place where Lord Vishnu blessed Dhruva, making it a significant location in this story.

== Deity ==
The main deity of the temple is Lord Srungara Vallabha Swamy, regarded as a manifestation of Lord Venkateswara. This deity is portrayed with a distinctive smiling expression. It is believed that the deity appears in different sizes to devotees, in proportion to their own height. In contrast to the conventional depictions of Lord Venkateswara, the positions of the deity's Sankha (conch) and Chakra (disc) are placed differently in this idol.

== Architecture ==
The temple follows a traditional Dravidian architecture style. The main entrance features a gateway with four pillars. Inside, the temple includes the Ranga Mandapa with eight intricately carved pillars, and the Mukha Mandapa with sixteen pillars, which hold around 13 historical inscriptions. The pillars depict various mythological themes, including scenes from the lives of Vishnu and Krishna.

The sanctum of the temple houses the main deity, Sri Srungara Vallabharaya Swami, along with his consorts Sri Devi and Bhu Devi, in a standing posture. The deity is approximately 4.5 feet tall. Surrounding the temple is a circumambulatory path and stone walls with seven gateways, some of which are damaged or buried over time.

To aid the accessibility of the temple, the Godavari Urban Development Authority (GUDA) has initiated the construction of an arch gate at Divili village, which is located approximately one kilometer from the temple. The temple’s well is noted for having a consistent water supply, even during the summer months.

== Inscriptions and donations ==
The temple inscriptions highlight various donations, particularly land donations made by rulers such as Kapileswarapur Rayalu and contributions by Pratapavatsava Ayyappa Maharaju in the 15th century CE. Local zamindars and Reddi rulers, such as Anavota Reddy and Vemareddy, also contributed resources and lands for the temple’s upkeep.

== Religious significance ==
The Sri Srungara Vallabharaya Swami Temple is an important centre for Vaishnavism in the region. Local legends suggest that the deity’s reversed conch and discus symbolize divine blessings to the sage Dhruva. Additionally, the temple is associated with the consecration of Lakshmi Devi and Bhu Devi by sages Narada and Krishnadevaraya, respectively.

== Festivals and rituals ==
The temple follows the Vaikhanasa Agama tradition. Major annual festivals include the Kalyanotsavam held on Chaitra Shuddha Ekadasi and special rituals during Dhanurmasa. Festivals like the Brahmotsavams and Rathotsavams involve processions of the deities around the village, attracting large numbers of devotees.

The temple also has a sub-temple dedicated to Lord Shiva, and a square-shaped well called Bodna Bavi located southeast of the temple. Bathing in the well during the Kartika month is believed to bring blessings, particularly for progeny.
