= Tirupati, Kakinada district =

Tirupati, Kakinada district Tirupathi
- Village
- Interactive map of Tirupati, Kakinada district
- Location in Andhra Pradesh, India
- Coordinates: 17°9′N 82°9′E
- Country: India
- State: Andhra Pradesh
- District: Kakinada
- Mandal: Peddapuram

Languages
  - Official: Telugu
- Time zone: UTC+5:30 (IST)
- Postal code: 53333

Tirupati is a south Indian village in Peddapuram Mandal in Kakinada district of Andhra Pradesh.

Tholi Tirupati is one of the famous ancient temples of South India, Located near Peddapuram, Kakinada, Andhra Pradesh; famous for Divine Lord Sringara Vallabha Swami.
