= Anuru, Peddapuram mandal =

Anuru
- village
- Interactive map of Anuru
- Location in Andhra Pradesh, India Anuru (India)
- Coordinates: 17.08°N 82.13°E
- Country: India
- State: Andhra Pradesh
- District: Kakinada

Population (2001)
  - Total: 6,082

Languages
  - Official: Telugu
- Time zone: UTC+5:30 (IST)
- PIN: 533437

Anuru is an Indian village in Peddapuram Mandal in Kakinada district of Andhra Pradesh in the southern part of India. Lord Sri Rama Sameta Satyanayarana Swamy temple has been constructed in 2007 with help of villagers as well as donors. Sri. N V Apparao garu is the president for this Temple Committee.
