= Ulimeswaram =

- village
- Interactive map of Ulimeswaram
- Location in Andhra Pradesh, India
- Coordinates: 17.128155°N 82.130548°E
- Country: India
- State: Andhra Pradesh

Languages
  - Official: Telugu
- Time zone: UTC+5:30 (IST)

Ulimeswaram (sometimes spelled Vulimeswaram) is a south Indian village in Peddapuram Mandal in the Kakinada district of Andhra Pradesh.
