= Sirivada =

Sirivada సిరివాడ
- village
- Location in Andhra Pradesh, India Sirivada (India)
- Coordinates: 17.1130400°N 82.1294100°E
- Country: India
- State: Andhra Pradesh
- District: Kakinada

Languages
  - Official: Telugu
- Time zone: UTC+5:30 (IST)
- PIN: 533437
- LGD local body code: 587354
- Vehicle registration: AP

SIRIWADA is a village in Peddapuram Mandal in the Kakinada district of Andhra Pradesh. It is home to the primary school MPPS Sirivada. It is a small village.
