= Chinabrahmadevam =

- Village
- Interactive map of Chinabrahmadevam
- Location in Andhra Pradesh, India Chinabrahmadevam (India)
- Coordinates: 17.024035°N 82.089735°E
- Country: India
- State: Andhra Pradesh
- District: Kakinada

Population (2011)
  - Total: 2,683

Languages
  - Official: Telugu
- Time zone: UTC+5:30 (IST)
- PIN: 533437
- Vehicle registration: AP-05

Chinabrahmadevam is a village in Peddapuram Mandal, located in Kakinada district of the Indian state of Andhra Pradesh.
