= Pulimeru =

Coordinates: 17°08′N 82°10′E

- village
- Interactive map of Pulimeru
- Country: India
- State: Andhra Pradesh
- District: Kakinada
- Named for: Agriculture (paddy, cane sugar)

Languages
  - Official: Telugu
- Time zone: UTC+5:30 (IST)
- PIN: 533433
- Telephone code: 08852
- Vehicle registration: AP 05
- Nearest city: Samalkot
- Lok Sabha (Kakinada) constituency: Vanga Geetha
- Legislative Assembly(Peddapuram) constituency: Nimmakayala China Rajappa
- Climate: moderate (Köppen)

Pulimeru is a South Indian village in Peddapuram Mandal in the Kakinada district of Andhra Pradesh.

The village is actually called as "Polimera" which means the border. The village is on the border of Peddapuram Maharaja's kingdom, and has a lot of historical importance. In the 2011 census, it had a population of 3881, made up of 1966 males, and 1915 females, combining to make 1075 families.
