= G. Ragampeta =

- village
- Interactive map of G. Ragampeta
- Location in Andhra Pradesh, India
- Coordinates: 17.06575°N 82.12265°E
- Country: India
- State: Andhra Pradesh
- District: Kakinada

Population
  - Total: 5,586

Languages
  - Official: Telugu
- Time zone: UTC+5:30 (IST)
- PIN: 533437
- Nearest cities: Jalluru (3.5 km), Samalkota (3.5 km), Gorinta (3.8 km), Peddapuram (3.8 km), Kakinada (18 km), Kirlampudi (11.8 km)
- Literacy: 85%

G. Ragampeta is a village in Peddapuram Mandal in Kakinada district of Andhra Pradesh. Located in East Godavari district, G.Ragampeta spans a total area of 459 hectares, with agricultural activities supported by irrigation from canals and bore wells covering over 281 hectares. The G. Ragampeta village has population of 4882 of which 2436 are males while 2446 are females as per Population Census 2011.
