= Gorinta =

- village
- Interactive map of Gorinta
- Location in Andhra Pradesh, India Gorinta (India)
- Coordinates: 17°06′36″N 82°10′03″E
- Country: India
- State: Andhra Pradesh
- District: Kakinada

Population (2001)
  - Total: 3,325

Languages
  - Official: Telugu
- Time zone: UTC+5:30 (IST)
- PIN: 533433

Gorinta is an Indian village in Peddapuram Mandal in Kakinada district of Andhra Pradesh. It is located on the road linking Samarlakota to Prathipadu.

== Demographics ==
	Total
Households :	900
Total Population :	3325
Male Population :	1675
Female Population :	1650
Youngsters Under 6 Yrs :	0378
Boys Under 6 Yrs :	0190
Girls Under 6 Yrs :	0188
Total Literates :	1871
Total Illiterates :	1454

== భౌగోళికం ==
https://web.archive.org/web/20081008014422/http://www.whereincity.com/india/pincode/andhra-pradesh/east-godavari.htm http://ourvillageindia.org/Place.aspx?PID=20313
