= J. Thimmapuram =

- Village
- Interactive map of J. Thimmapuram
- Location in Andhra Pradesh, India
- Country: India
- State: Andhra Pradesh
- District: Kakinada
- Mandal: Peddapuram

Languages
  - Official: Telugu
- Time zone: UTC+5:30 (IST)
- PIN: 533437

J. Thimmapuram is a village in Peddapuram mandal in Kakinada district of Andhra Pradesh.
