= Kandrakota =

- Village
- Interactive map of Kandrakota
- Location in Andhra Pradesh, India Kandrakota (India)
- Coordinates: 17.08°N 82.13°E
- Country: India
- State: Andhra Pradesh
- District: Kakinada

Area
  - Total: 5.21 km^{2} (2.01 sq mi)

Population (2011)
  - Total: 6,090
  - Density: 1,170/km^{2} (3,030/sq mi)

Languages
  - Official: Telugu
- Time zone: UTC+5:30 (IST)
- PIN: 533437

Kandrakota is a village in Kakinada district of the Indian state of Andhra Pradesh. It is located in Peddapuram mandal of Peddapuram revenue division.

== Demographics ==
Population data of Kandrakota Village at the 2011 census:

	Total
Households	1,731
Total population	6,090
Male population	3,080
Female population	3,010
Children under 6 yrs	618
Boys under 6 yrs	335
Girls under 6 yr	283
Literacy	64.16%
Total workers	2,178
