= Emblem of Kerala =

Indian state government emblem

- Armiger: The Government of Kerala
- Adopted: 1960
- Crest: State emblem of India
- Shield: A dextrally-coiled silver conch shell (Turbinella pyrum)
- Supporters: 2 Indian elephants with trunks raised in salutation pose
- Other elements: 2 banners below the shield, each for carrying the words "Government of Kerala" in English and "Kerala Sarkar" in Malayalam.
- Use: On all Acts of Niyamasabha; on all documents issued by state to the public; on all state correspondences of State Government and its agencies and on exteriors of all public state buildings.

The Emblem of Kerala is the official seal used by the Government of Kerala to represent the State of Kerala in all its official correspondences. The emblem portrays two elephants guarding the Emblem of India and the shankha (conch) of Padmanabhaswamy (a regional form of Vishnu) to represent History of Kerala.

== Description ==
A sacred shankha on the flag of Travancore, India

The official Kerala emblem is a derivative version of the Royal coat of arms of the Travancore. The state emblem symbolizes two elephants guarding the state emblem of India and the emblem of Tranvancore Kingdom (a dextrally-coiled silver) conch shell (Turbinella pyrum). The current emblem of Kerala was adopted in 1960 when Pattom A. Thanu Pillai's government came to power after the removal of E. M. S. Namboodiripad by the Union Government.

=== Changes in Emblem ===
Kerala Government has made changes in its official emblem. The changes, as per the recommendation of a committee that looked into the issue, were made to make the state emblem in tune with the national emblem as the Government of India uses the phrase 'Satyameva Jayate' below the four lions standing back-to-back, an official release said.

In the former version, 'Satyameva Jayate' was written below the two saluting elephants, after the words 'Government of Kerala'. Apart from this, the committee has also suggested increasing the size of the fonts for writing Government of Kerala in both Malayalam and English.

In an order issued on 3 January 2011, the general administration department shifted the national motto from the base of the emblem to the base of the national emblem on top in accordance with the National Emblem. The order was based on the recommendation of the Official Language (Legislative) Commission. Though the Commission also suggested keeping only the Malayalam version 'Kerala Sarkar', it was not accepted based on the fact that the emblem is also used for the official communication with Centre and various state governments.

The government had asked all departments to incorporate the changes when they use the symbol in future, the release said. However, many departments are still using the old logo despite the circular issued to all department heads and others.

== History ==
=== Ancient Kerala ===
The earliest references of a national emblem in Kerala can be traced to times of Imperial Cheras who ruled much of the modern Kerala until 1102 AD.

=== Medieval Kerala ===
Much of the medieval period started after partition of Chera Empire by last Chera Emperor, Cheraman Perumal in 1102 AD, forming a numerous small feudal states and larger kingdoms like Kochi, Zamorin, Venad etc.

==== Malabar ====
The Malabar region comprised primarily two major kingdoms. The first and oldest among them was Kolathunadu (Chirakkal), ruled by powerful Mooshika dynasty, who believes to direct descent of first line of Chera Emperors. There emblem a chained oil lamp (changalavattam) above it, further above a vertically placed the Great Sword of Nandakam, followed on either adjacent sides by a Vaakapoovu, a red flower known for its fragrance. The first large empire to be formed in post Chera period under the suzerainty of Nair Kings, the Zamorins of Calicut. The Zamorins was the first state to mark use of a formal state emblem, that can be regularly used as identification of the state in all its official correspondences.

The legend says, that during partition of Kerala, the last Chera Emperor did not give any land to his most trusted Nair lieutenant. Due to the feel of guilt, the emperor gave his personal sword (Odaval) and his favourite prayer conch which was broken, to his general and asked him to occupy as much as land he can with his might. The general established the state of Kozhikode and created an empire for himself. As a token of his respect to the Chera Emperor, the Zamorins adopted the logo of 2 swords crossed each other, with a broken conch in middle and a lighted lamp above it. Soon this became the official emblem of Malabar until 1766 AD, when Mysore state under leadership of Hyder Ali defeated the Zamorins and annexed the state into it.

=== Colonial Kerala ===
The oldest emblem of Portuguese Cochin

==== Portuguese Cochin ====
The Portuguese, after issues with Zamorin, soon made Fort Kochi as its capital, after gaining extra-territorial rights from Kochi King. During this time, the emblem of Portuguese Kochi was Red Shield with Icons of Fort Immanuel (Older name of Fort Kochi) with a sailing wheel on top of it and a ship advancing, representing the maritime relations of Portuguese with India. The original logo, though designed in Kochi to represent the new state, was formally unveiled in 1510 after transferring the capital to Portuguese Goa State.

The Emblem of Dutch Cochin

==== Dutch Cochin ====
The Dutch under Dutch East India Company, soon came to Kochi and took over the Fort Immanuel from Portuguese after the Battle of Kochi in 1510. With this Kochi came under Dutch protection.

The Dutch Cochin shared the emblem of Dutch East India Company as its formal state emblem. The emblem was just a monogram carrying VOC, an abbreviation of Vereenigde Oost-Indische Compagnie. The remains of the official emblem of Dutch Cochin, can be still seen on top of VOC Gate in Fort Kochi, which was the main office of Dutch establishment in India.

==== Arakkal kingdom ====
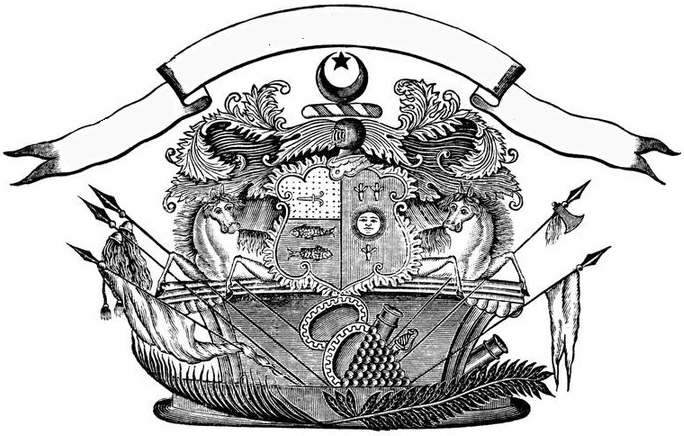
Coat of Arms of Arakkal kingdom, Arakkal Museum

Arakkal kingdom was a Muslim kingdom in Kannur town in Kannur district (on the north). The kingdom was annexed to British India in 1819.

On the coat of arms there were, among other things, two fish, which probably alluded to the Alupa dynasty.

==== Kingdom of Kochi ====
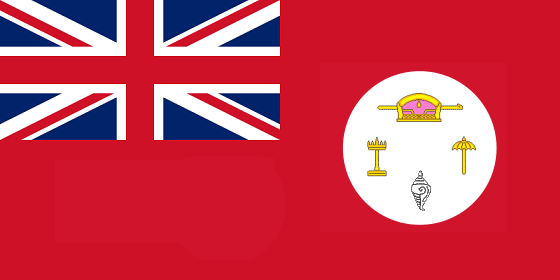
4 symbols on a merchant flag.

While Portuguese, Dutch and British were fighting each other over Fort Kochi and allied possessions, the Kingdom of Kochi retained its autonomy and maintained its administration separately. The Kingdom of Kochi has its traditional emblem derived its traditional family - the Perumpadappu Swaroopam. The traditional emblem consists of 4 icons namely, a palanquin, umbrella, lamp and a conch, representing aristocracy, welfare, prosperity and enlightenment respectively. In 1795, Sakthan Thampuran proclaimed the formal adoption of Kochi State Emblem. While the core elements of 4 icons was retained with a circular shield, decorated within a circular laurel carrying the official motto "Manadhana kula swatah" in Sanskrit (meaning Honor is our Family Property). The new emblem was recognized by British Government as official emblem of the Kingdom of Kochi and regularly used in all correspondences and decrees of the state.

In 1902, Rajarishi Rama Varma Maharaja modified the state emblem to suit to his western tastes. 2 guarding elephants were added, in addition to a banner below the original emblem carrying the official motto in English along with addition of Kochi Crown Image to its crest. The emblem continued to represent the Kingdom until 1947 when the state merged with Travancore to form a new state of Travancore-Kochi.

==== Kingdom of Travancore ====
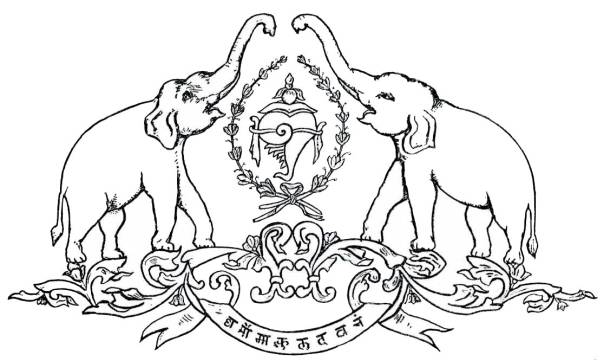
The 4th Royal Coat of Arms of Kingdom of Travancore until 1948.

Travancore was formed in 1729, under leadership of Marthanda Varma. Since the days of Venad, the family emblem of Thrippapur Swaroopam namely a right swelled Conch was used to represent the state. As the family deity was Lord Sri Padmanabha, the emblem of conch was widely used. Marthanda Varma added two laurel wreaths to it, to decorate the image which was used extensively in banners, flags, personal standards and coins until 1948.

In 1939, the Government of Travancore unveiled its new emblem with 2 elephants guarding the imperial crest of Shanku with a banner below to its crest carrying the words "Sri Padmanabha" in devanagiri script. The new coat of arms was the fourth revision of the emblem of the Kingdom of Travancore.

In addition, the Travancore had a western styled coat of arms, awarded by British Government during Delhi Durbar as well as individual Royal Cypher during reigns of each monarch, which will abbreviation of name of the reigning monarch in English with emblem of Shanku on top of it.

=== Modern Kerala ===
==== Travancore-Cochin ====
In 1948, the Kingdoms of Travancore and Cochin merged to form the state of Travancore–Cochin within the Dominion of India, after deciding to accede to the Indian Union soon after Indian independence.

The newly formed government, under leadership of Paravoor T. K. Narayana Pillai decided to adopt a new emblem for the state. The emblem was mixture of Travancore Coat of Arms along with Indian Union, 2 elephants in guarding position with an Indian Dharma Chakra in middle and the Sri Padmanabha's Shanku on top of it with a banner carrying words "Government of Travancore-Kochi" written in English. The emblem was in use until 1956.

==== Communist Kerala ====
The Communist Government of Kerala's Emblem from 1957–1959.

With passing of States Reorganization Act of 1956 by Indian Parliament, the state of Kerala was formed merging Travancore-Cochin with Malabar. After the elections of 1957, the communists led by E. M. S. Namboodiripad came to power. The newly formed Communist Government decided to adopt a different state emblem as the emblem in use was an inherited legacy of monarchy days. The state emblem with the Communist Government adopted in 1957 featured an Indian elephant representing Cochin, 2 Shanku on its crest representing Northern and Southern Travancore respectively and two palm-trees for the Northern and Southern Malabar, encircled in a crest with Indian National emblem on top.

However much of the public was against the move to adopt new emblem and opposed it vigorously.

==== Present ====
With the removal of communist government from power in 1959, the newly formed Congress led coalition government adopted the current emblem with slight modifications from original Travancore Coat of Arms. The emblem devised by Communist Government was later adopted by Kerala Police with slight modifications to represent the force.

== Other versions ==
Though the official state emblem is governed as per Government Order passed in 1960, a slight modified versions are used by certain Government departments. For example, Industries Department uses and cog wheel around the Shanku emblem as the shield, whereas local self governments like Panchyats etc. uses an Ashoka Chakra as the shield around the Shanku. Kerala Sports Council replaces traditional laurel as shield as well as Indian emblem as its emblem leaving just 2 elephants and Shanku. Kerala State Road Transport Corporation, also uses the state emblem in a different shade and replaces the banner with KSRTC lettering.

The Travancore Royal Family uses the erstwhile Royal Coat of Arms of Travancore today for its official purposes, though commonly the Imperial Insignia of Shanku is used more commonly.whereas Sri Padmanabhaswamy Temple of Trivandrum uses only the Imperial Conch crest as its coat of arms.

== Government banner ==
The Government of Kerala can be represented by a banner displaying the emblem of the state on a white field.

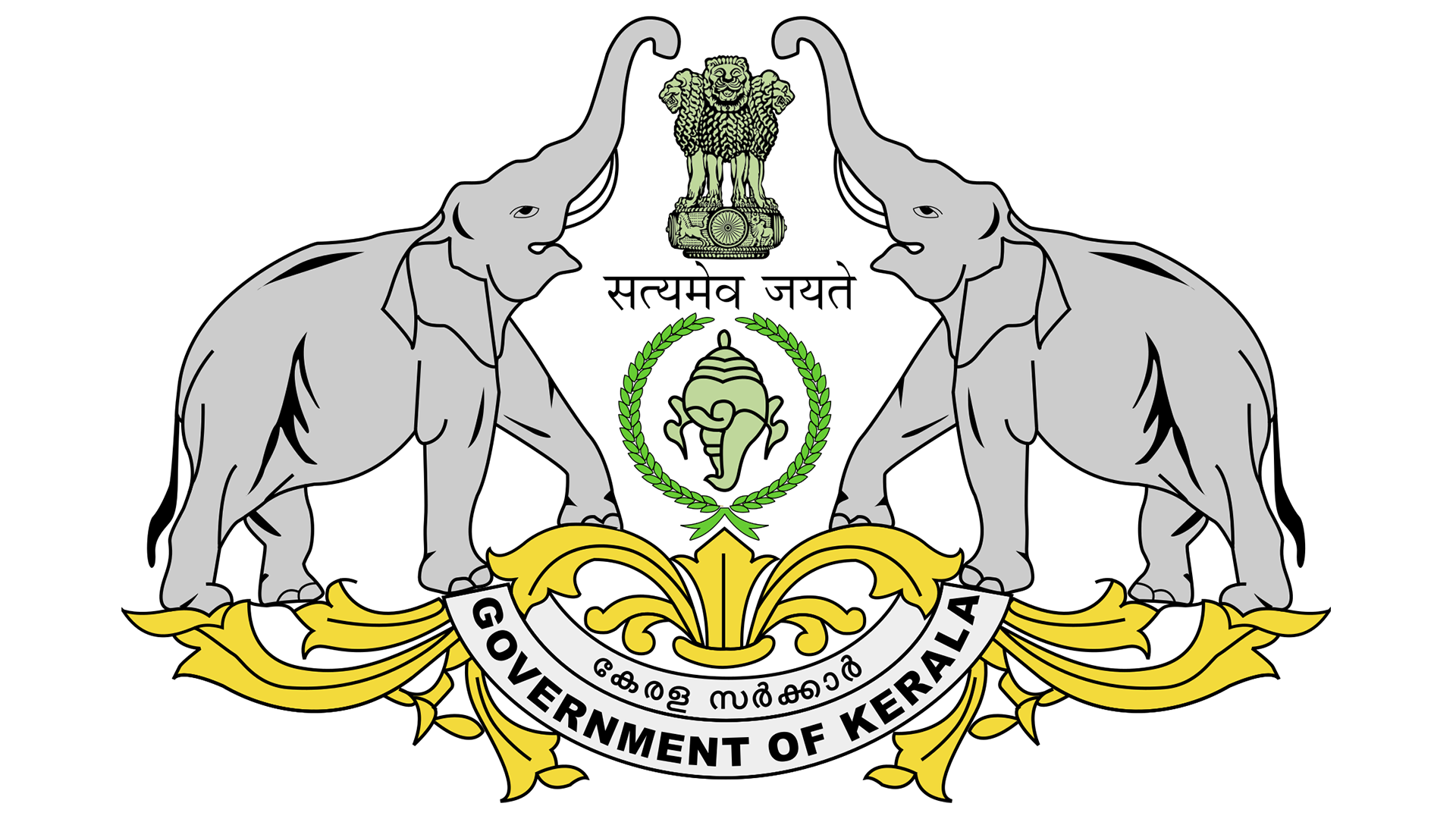
Banner of Kerala

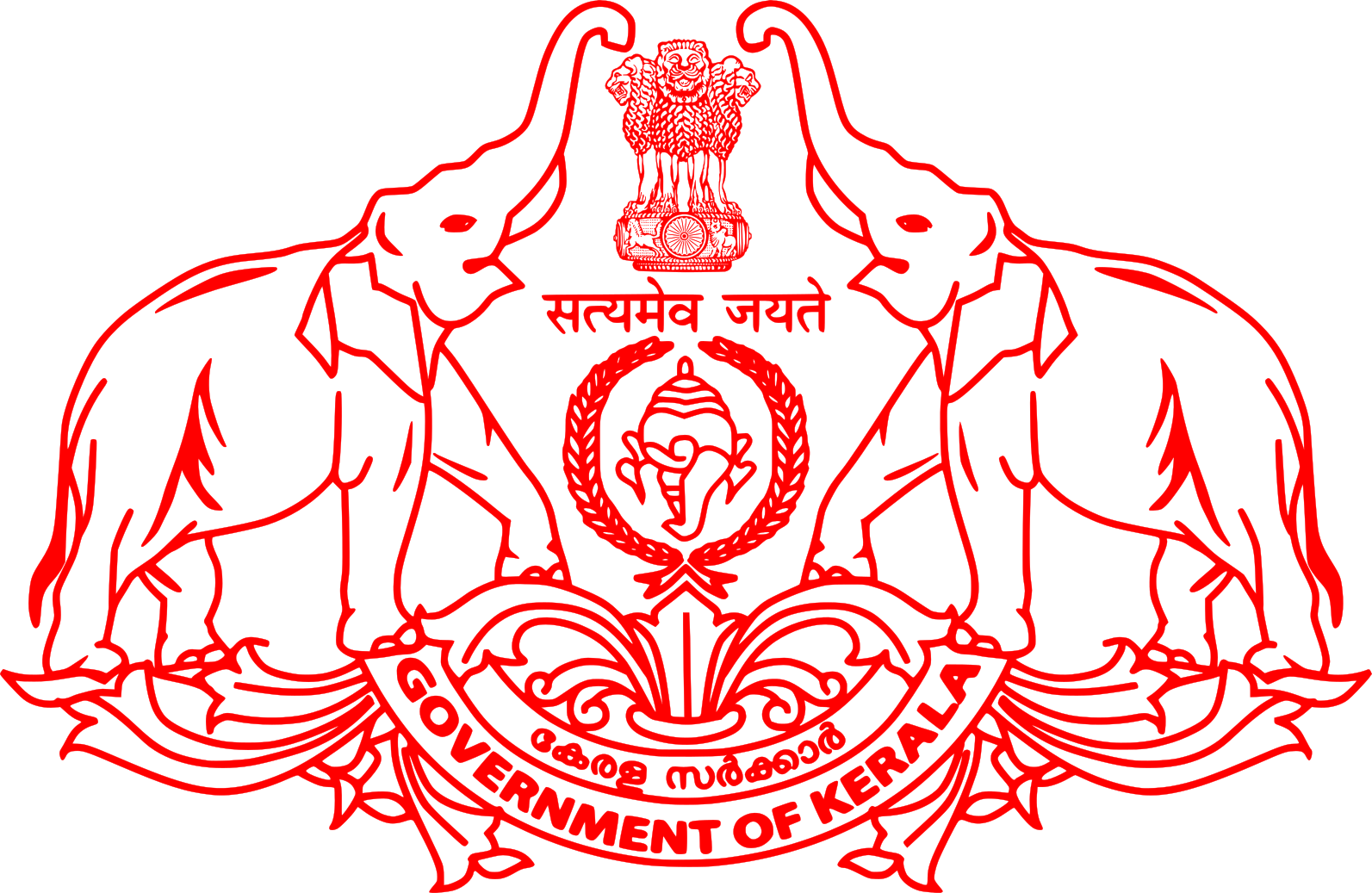
Emblem of Government of Kerala in red.

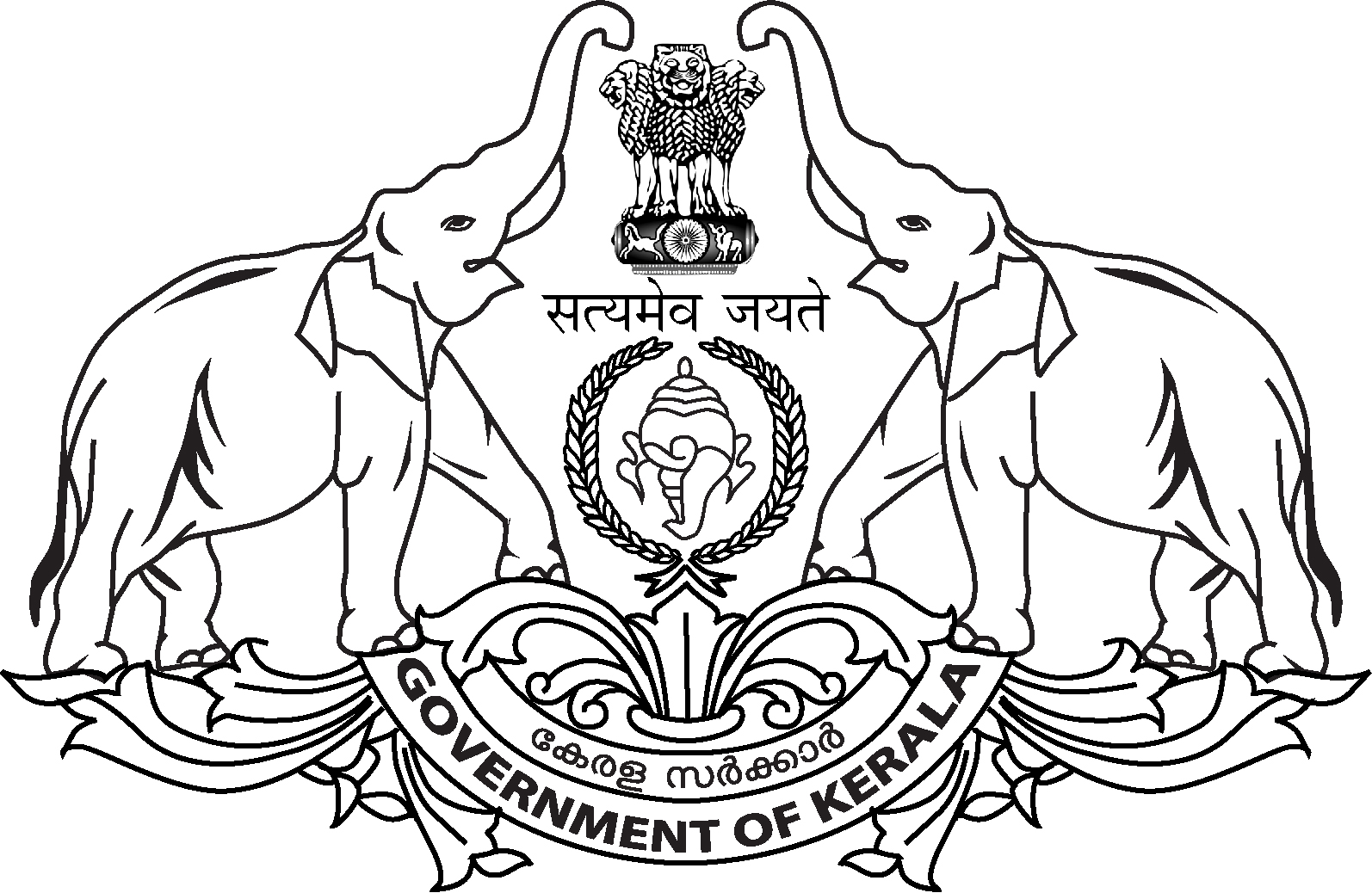
Emblem of Government of Kerala in black

== See also ==
- State Emblem of India
- List of Indian state emblems
