= Gudivada, Kakinada district =

Gudivada Peddapuram
- village
- Interactive map of Gudivada
- Location in Andhra Pradesh, India Gudivada (India)
- Coordinates: 16°27′N 80°59′E
- Country: India
- State: Andhra Pradesh
- District: Kakinada

Languages
  - Official: Telugu
- Time zone: UTC+5:30 (IST)

Gudivada or Peddapuram is a village in Peddapuram Mandal, Kakinada district of Andhra Pradesh.

It is one of the areas where special teams appointed by Superintendent of Police M Ravindranath Babu and his team conducted raids where crores of rupees allegedly changed hands for illegal cockfighting.
