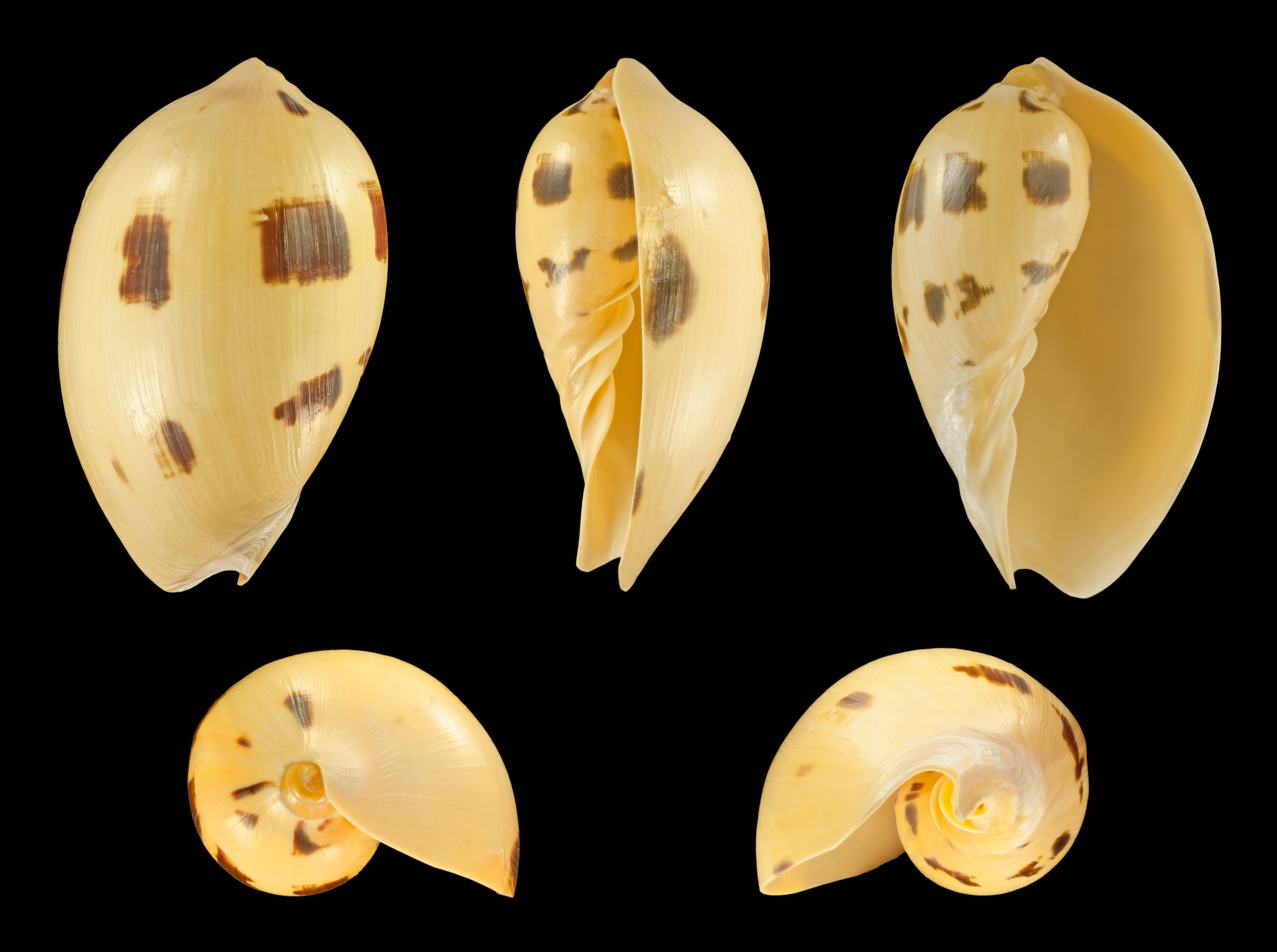
- A shell of the Indian volute, Melo melo

Scientific classification
- Kingdom: Animalia
- Phylum: Mollusca
- Class: Gastropoda
- Subclass: Caenogastropoda
- Order: Neogastropoda
- Family: Volutidae
- Genus: Melo
- Species: M. melo

Binomial name
- Melo melo (Lightfoot, 1786)

Synonyms
- Cymbium maculatum Röding, 1798; Cymbium melo (Lightfoot, 1786); Melo melo melo (Lightfoot, 1786)· accepted, alternate representation; Voluta anguria Lightfoot, 1786; Melo indica (Gmelin, 1791); Voluta anguria Lightfoot, 1786; Voluta citrina Fischer, 1807; Voluta indica Gmelin, 1791; Yetus indicus (Gmelin, 1791)

= Melo melo =

Indian volute

Species of gastropod

Melo melo, common name the Indian volute or bailer shell (also spelled baler), is a very large edible sea snail, a marine gastropod mollusc in the family Volutidae, the volutes.

== Distribution ==
The distribution of this species is restricted to Southeast Asia, from Burma, Thailand and Malaysia, to the South China Sea and the Philippines.

== Habitat ==
This large sea snail is known to live in littoral and shallow sublittoral zones. It usually dwells in muddy bottoms at a maximum depth of nearly 20 m.

== Feeding ==
Melo melo is known to be carnivorous, as laboratory experiments have shown. It is a specialized predator of other continental shelf predatory gastropods, notably Hemifusus tuba (Melongenidae) and Babylonia lutosa (Buccinidae). It is also a known predator of the dog conch, Strombus canarium (Strombidae).

== Shell description ==
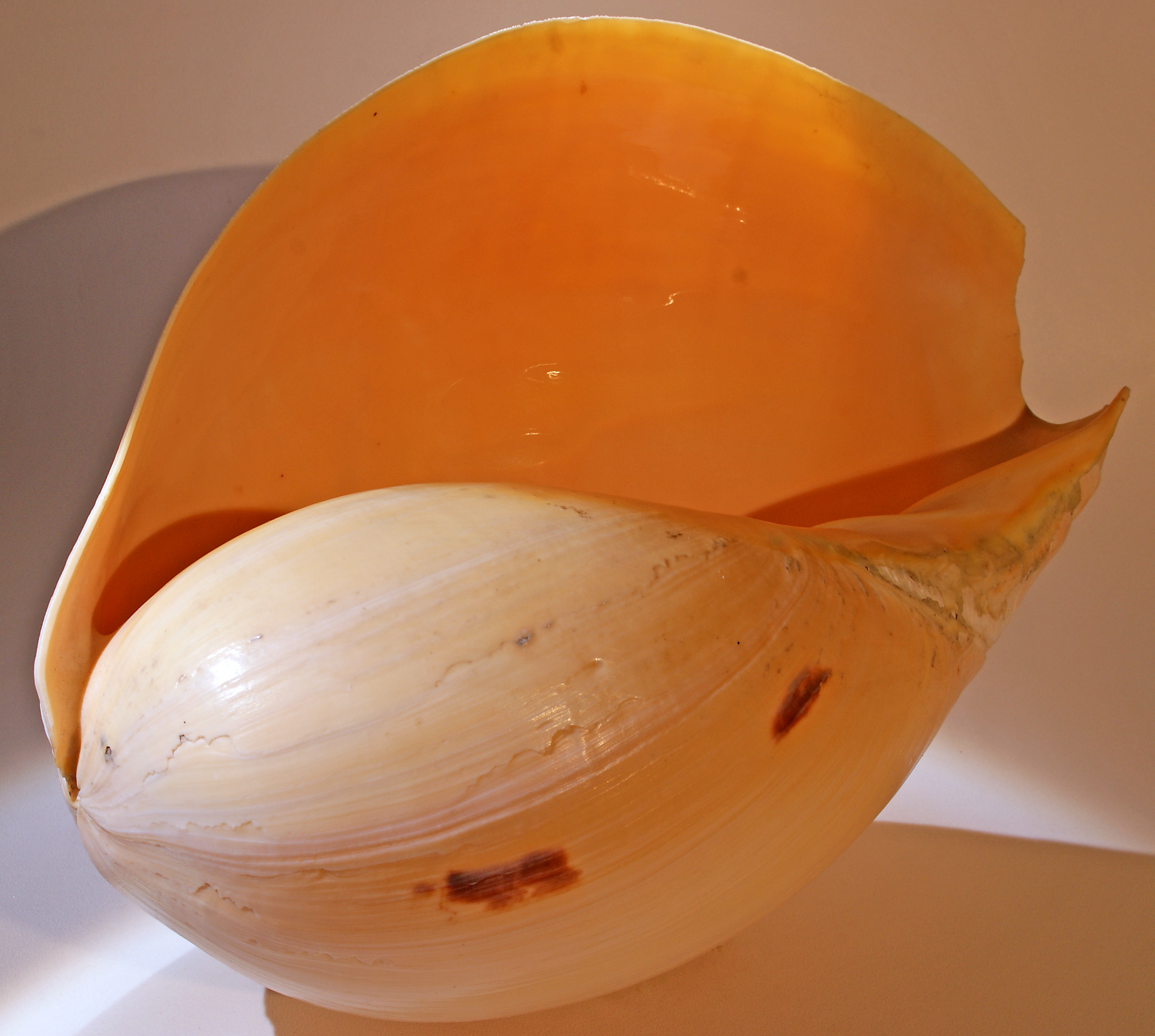
A shell of Melo melo.

The maximum shell length of this species is up to 275 mm, commonly to 175 mm.

The notably large shell of Melo melo has a bulbous or nearly oval outline, with a smooth outer surface presenting distinguishable growth lines. The outside of shell colour is commonly pale orange, sometimes presenting irregular banding of brown spots, while the interior is glossy cream, becoming light yellow near its margin. The columella has three or four long and easily distinguishable columellar folds. It has a wide aperture, nearly as long as the shell itself, yet this species is known to have no operculum. The shell's spire is completely enclosed by the body whorl, which is inflated and quite large, and has a rounded shoulder with no spines. The apex is of smooth type.

== Pearls ==
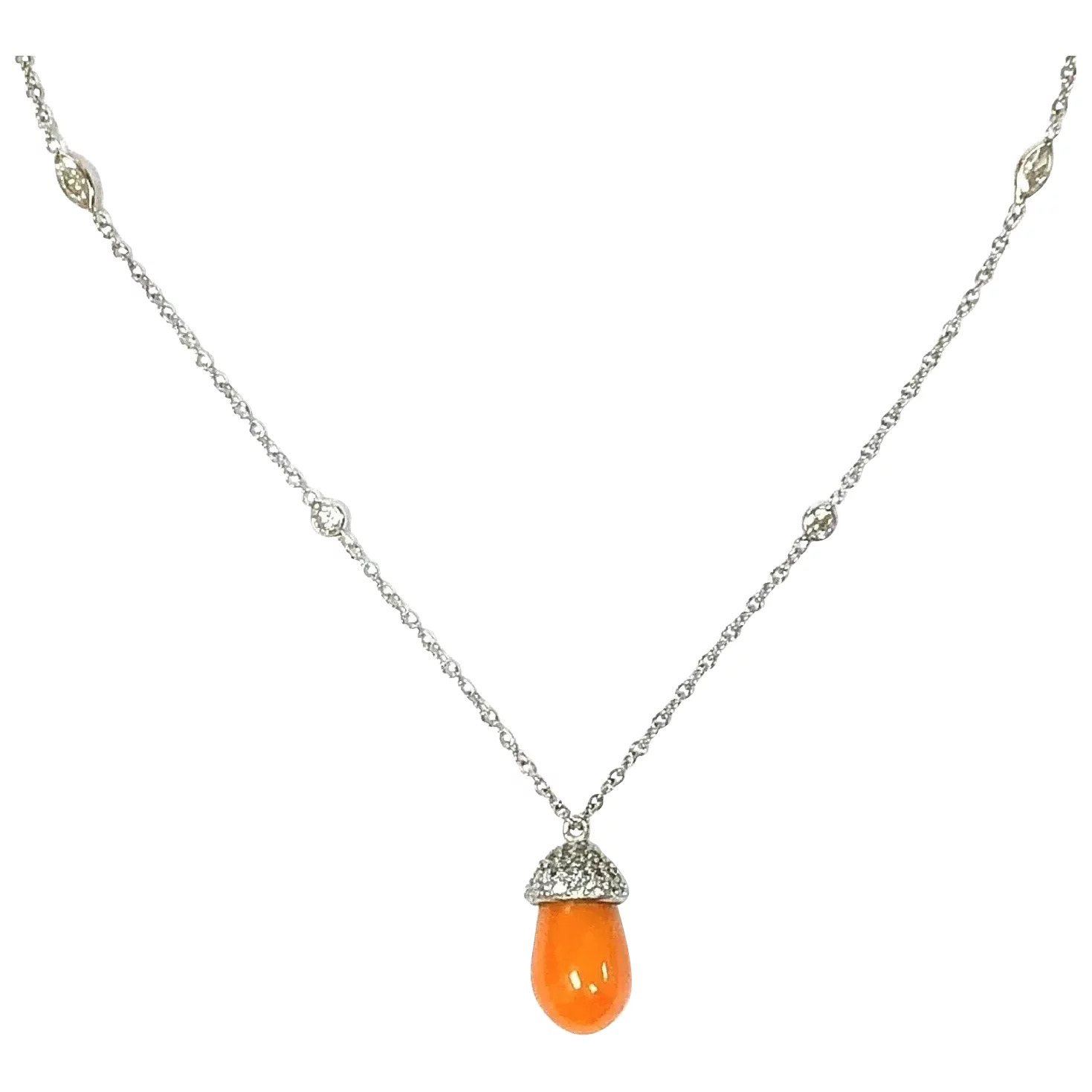
A melo pearl, diamond and platinum necklace.

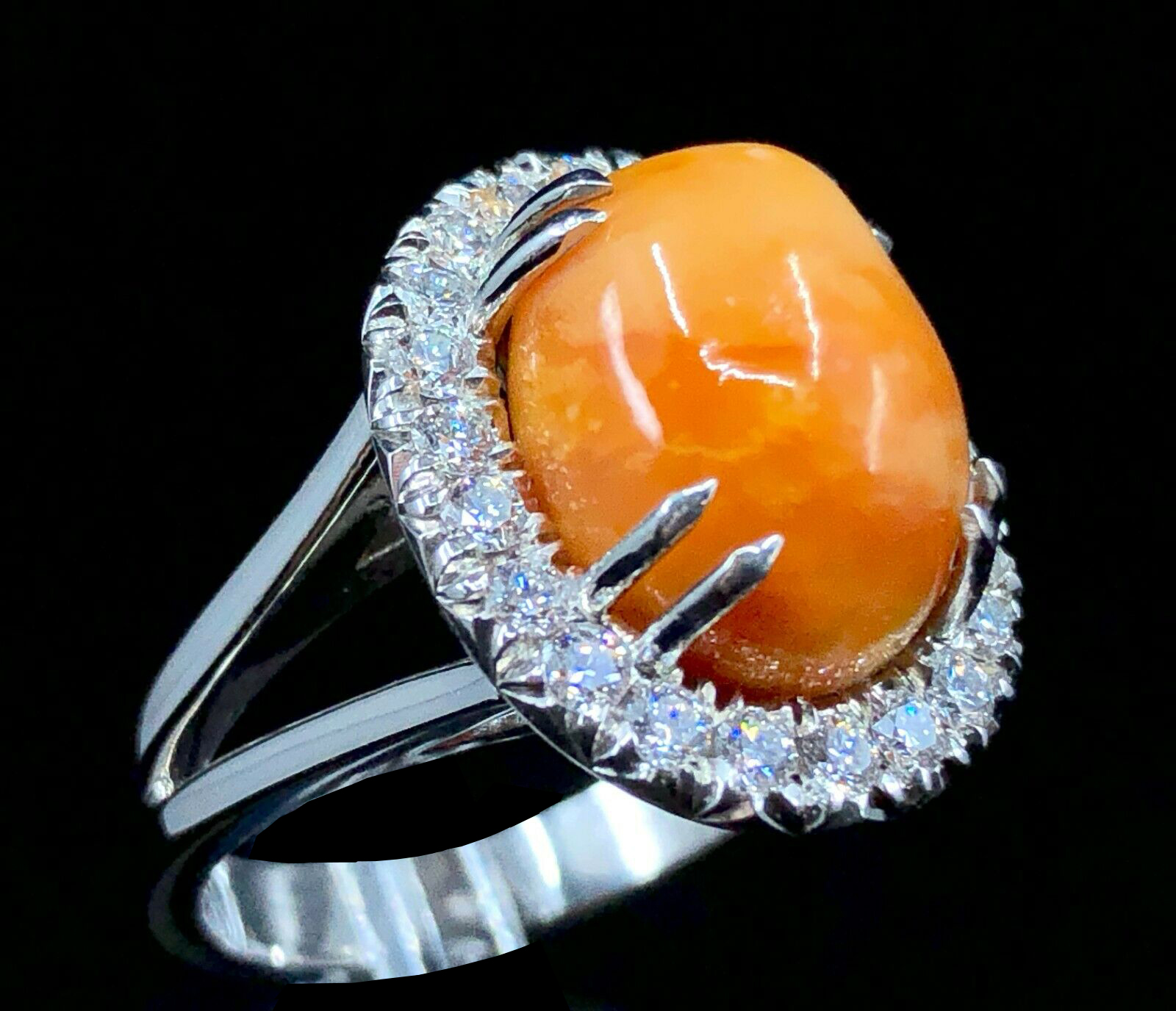
A melo pearl, diamond and platinum ring.

This volute is known to produce pearls; however, the Melo melo pearl has no nacre, unlike the pearl of a pearl oyster. The GIA and CIBJO now simply use the term 'pearl' (or, where appropriate, the more descriptive term 'non-nacreous pearl') when referring to such items, rather than the previously used term 'calcareous concretion' and, under Federal Trade Commission rules, various mollusc pearls may be referred to as 'pearls' without any qualification. The melo pearl is created by the mollusc in the same way as other pearls are created by other molluscs.

See also: Conch Pearl

== Human use ==
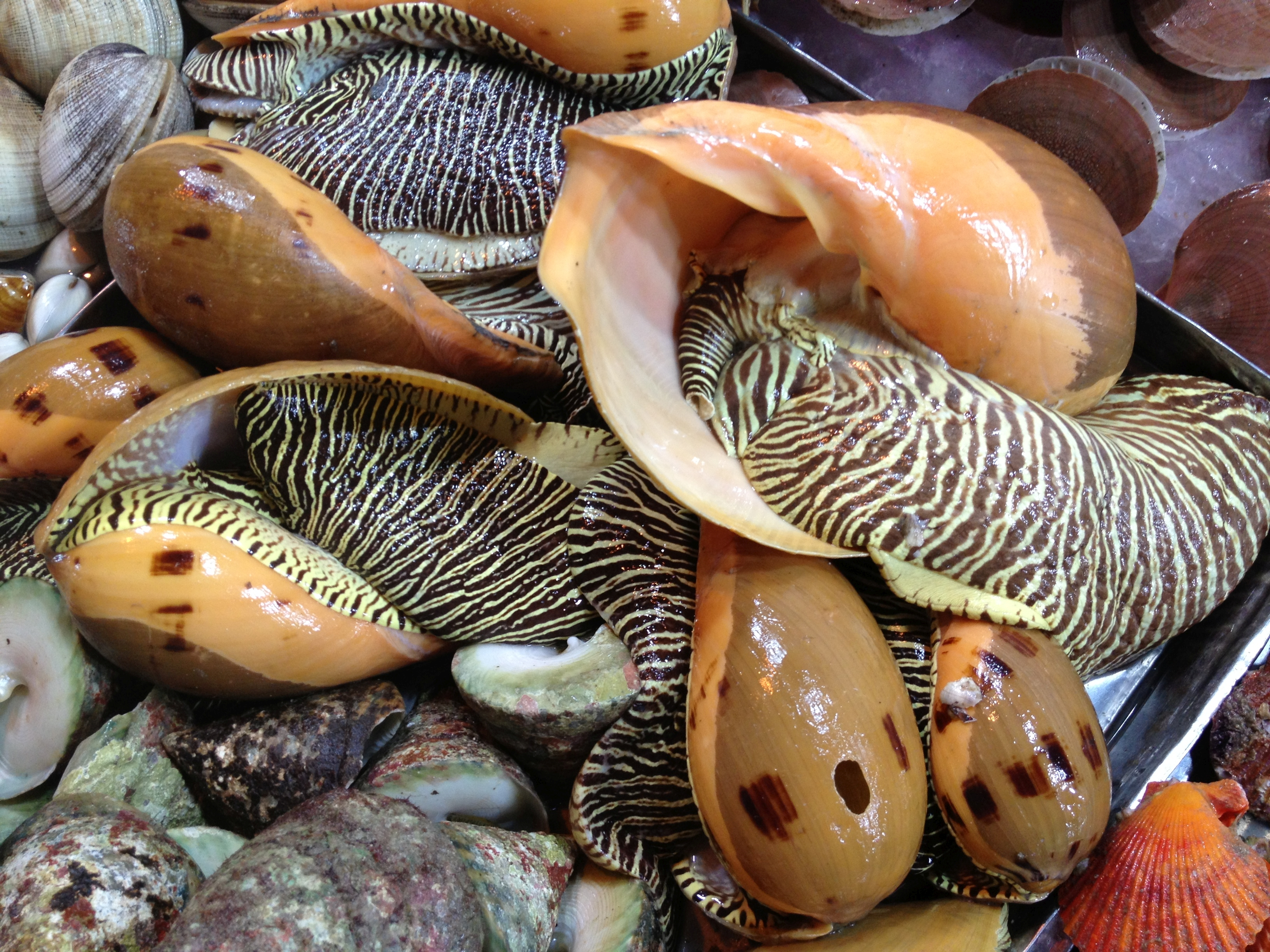
Melo melo for sale at market.

This volute is often collected as seafood by local fishermen. The shells are also often used as decoration, or as scoops for powdery substances in local markets. The shell is also traditionally utilized by the native fishermen to bail their boats, therefore it is commonly called "bailer shell".

This snail is eaten in Vietnamese cuisine in dishes such as coconut milk sea snails (Vietnamese: Ốc Len Xào Dừa).

== See also ==
- Shankha
- Dakshinavarti Shankh
