= Dakshinavarti shankha =

Sacred conch shell in Hinduism

A Sri Lakshmi conch shell

Dakshinavarti shankha (Sanskrit: दक्षिणावर्ती शंख, romanized: Dakṣiṇāvarta śaṅkha), also referred to as Valampuric caṅku (Tamil: வலம்புரிச் சங்கு) and Sri Lakshmi shankha (Sanskrit: श्रीलक्ष्मी शंख, romanized: Śrīlakṣmī śaṅkha) is a sacred Hindu conch. It refers to the shell of a large sea snail from the Indian Ocean (a shell of the species Turbinella pyrum), but one that has a rare reverse-turning spiral.

The shankha is held with the spout (siphonal canal) pointed up; its spiral twists rightwards rather than the more common form, which twists leftwards.

== Terminology ==
In scientific usage a dextral (Latin: dexter, right) shell has the opening on the right, when viewed with the spire upwards. The opposite is sinistral (Latin: sinister, left). This is consistent with the terms for right-handed screws in engineering and physics. Most species of sea snail are dextral. Within a typically dextral species, rare individuals may develop sinistral coiling.

In religious usage, the shankha (sacred conch shell) is displayed spire downwards and in this orientation, the sacred sinistral shell has its opening on the right while a common dextral shell has its opening on the left (Sanskrit: vamavarti).

It is rendered shankha in Sanskrit, shankh in Hindi, and changu in Tamil.

== Authenticity ==
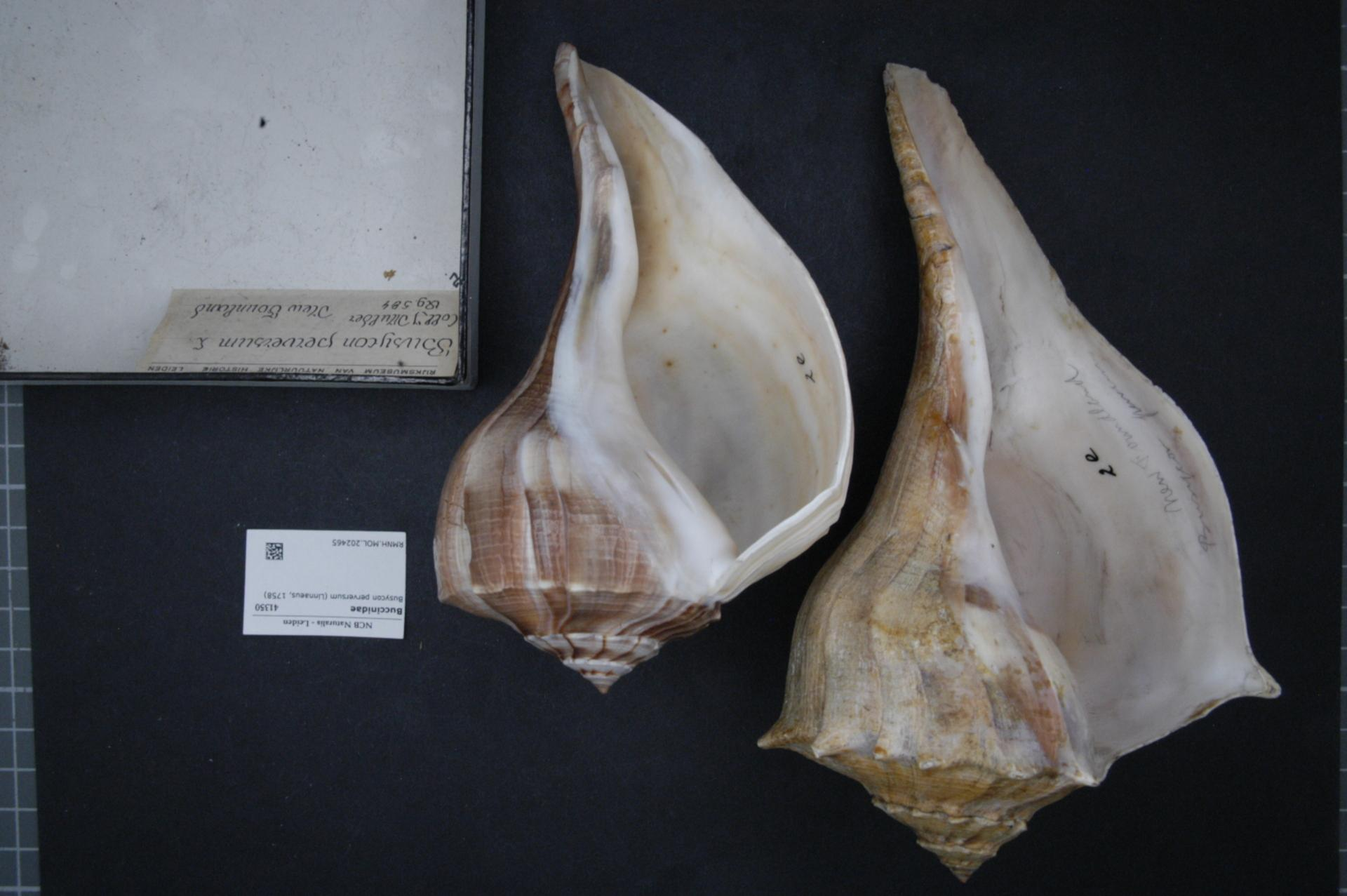
The lightning whelk shell (pictured) is often mistakenly sold as a Valampuri conch shell.

The genuine Lakshmi conch shell is a rare sinistral Turbinella conch shell from the Indian Ocean, usually from Turbinella pyrum.

Other right-turning sea snail shells are often mistakenly sold and worshiped in place of the genuine shankha. One common substitution is the lightning whelk (Sinistrofulgur perversum, previously named Busycon perversum) from the Atlantic coast of North America. The real shankha has 3 to 7 ridges or plaits on its columella, whereas whelk shells have no such plaits.

The so-called "flower-bud opening test", and the "rice pulling test" (Valampuri said to rise up through a rice heap) are non-scientific. The best authenticity test is to take an X-ray image of the Valampuri. Valampuries show some morphological variation depending on origin, and shells with mixed characters of two adjacent localities are seen. There are some fake Valampuri shells manufactured by taking a normal Vamavarti shell and applying plaster to make it look like a Valampuri shell.

In South India, people trust only the type of shells that are found near Rameshwaram, and do not trust other varieties from the West Coast and Bay of Bengal, though these are also genuine shells.

In South India, people specifically worship 'Gauri Valampuri', dedicated to the goddess Parvati. This shell shows small dark spots on its body whorl, near the conch cavity. These dots are of conch skin i.e. of periostracum in the form of small dark coloured pustules firmly attached in very small ditches or cavities, and are difficult to remove. In cases where the periostracum pustules are removed, dark coloured spots still appear on the conch body. The Gauri Type (with periostracum spots) of Valampuri is rare and is more expensive than other types.

== Origin ==
Genuine Dakshinavarti Lakshmi Conches are only found in the Indian Ocean, between Myanmar (Burma) and Sri Lanka. The three main localities - near Rama Setu, Sri Lanka, and Rameshwaram to Tuticorin (rare); the Arabian Sea; and the Bay of Bengal. Shells from each locality show distinct morphological variations, although varieties showing mixed characters have been observed.

The main imitation (lightning whelks) mostly come from Florida and the Gulf of Mexico. This imitation is known as the American Valampuri. Other than Busyconid species, few other species showing presence of folds in the cavity are wrongly mentioned as Dakshinavarti. These shells, though sinistral and possessing folds, are from other species.

== Rarity ==
Varieties of Valampuri conch shells are defined by their locality where they are found. The three main localities are Rameshwaram, Ram Setu, and Sri Lanka. The second is the West Coast of India or Arabian Sea and the third is Bay of Bengal. All three types show variation.

Real Lakshmi Conch (right side spinning) are estimated to occur once per 100,000 conch shells. The shell of the lightning whelk almost always opens on the right (when viewed with the siphonal canal pointing upwards) but the lightning whelk shells are not considered sacred because a real shankha has 3 to 7 ridges or plaits on its columella, whereas whelk shells have no such plaits. Valampuries with five plaits or folds in its cavity are known as 'Panchajanya' (symbolic of the conch shell used by Lord Krishna) and are rare.

Most of the Indian Valampuri conch shells show the presence of orange coloured inner lip. Valampuri shells with orange brown inner lip and with orange coloured stripes on the main body whorl are also seen. Completely milky-white Valampuri shells are rare and expensive. Gauri Valampuri shells showing presence of dark brown or black periostracum (conch skin) spots near its cavity on main body whorl look beautiful and are rare and expensive. Giant Valampuri shells more than 10 kg are extremely rare. Valampuri shells more than 3 feet long and many freak types in Valampuri shells have been reported.

== Beliefs ==
The Lakshmi Conch is said to bring all manner of blessings, particularly material wealth. Ritual use may include bathing deities, drinking from the conch, or the use of mantras oriented to goddess Lakshmi. It is a wonderful object for Vastu offering high positive energy. It is believed to bring power, and mental and physical prosperity on the inner and external world. It also heals relationships, make them healthier.

== See also ==
- Conch
- Melo melo
- Shankha
