= Chadalada =

- village
- Interactive map of Chadalada
- Location in Andhra Pradesh, India Chadalada (India)
- Coordinates: 17°08′49″N 82°09′02″E
- Country: India
- State: Andhra Pradesh
- District: Kakinada
- Mandal: Peddapuram

Population (2001)
  - Total: 2,103

Languages
  - Official: Telugu
- Time zone: UTC+5:30 (IST)
- PIN: 533437

Chadalada is a village in Peddapuram Mandal in Kakinada district of Andhra Pradesh, India.
