= Kattamuru =

- village
- Interactive map of Kattamuru
- Location in Andhra Pradesh, India Kattamuru (India)
- Coordinates: 17.08°N 82.13°E
- Country: India
- State: Andhra Pradesh
- District: Kakinada
- Elevation: 35 m (115 ft)

Population (2001)
  - Total: 9,054

Languages
  - Official: Telugu
- Time zone: UTC+5:30 (IST)
- PIN: 533437

Kattamuru is a major panchayath village in Peddapuram Mandal of Kakinada district of Andhra Pradesh in South India.

== Geography ==
Kattamuru is located at 17.08° N 82.13° E. It has an average elevation of 35 metres (114 feet).

== Demographics ==
Population Data of Kattamuru Village as per 2001 Census:

	Total
Households :	2350
Total Population :	9054
Male Population :	4587
Female Population :	4467
Kids Under 6 Yrs :	1236
Boys Under 6 Yrs :	0657
Girls Under 6 Yrs :	0579
Total Literates :	4372
Total Illiterates :	4782
