= Marlava =

- village
- Interactive map of Marlava
- Location in Andhra Pradesh, India Marlava (India)
- Coordinates: 17.1562800°N 82.1219400°E
- Country: India
- State: Andhra Pradesh
- District: Kakinada

Languages
  - Official: Telugu
- Time zone: UTC+5:30 (IST)

Marlava is a south Indian village in Peddapuram Mandal in Kakinada district of Andhra Pradesh.
