= Vadlamuru =

Village in Andhra Pradesh, India

- Village
- Interactive map of Vadlamuru
- Location in Andhra Pradesh, India
- Coordinates: 17.097383°N 82.162796°E
- Country: India
- State: Andhra Pradesh
- District: Kakinada
- Elevation: 9.4 m (31 ft)

Population
  - Total: 1,700+
  - Rank: 1st

Languages
  - Official: Telugu
- Time zone: UTC+5:30 (IST)
- PIN: 533437
- Telephone code: 91884
- Vehicle registration: AP-5

Vadlamuru is a village in Peddapuram Mandal in Kakinada district of Andhra Pradesh, India.
