= Chandramampalle =

Village in Andhra Pradesh, India

- Village
- Interactive map of Chandramampalle
- Location within Andhra Pradesh
- Coordinates: 17°08′48″N 82°09′46″E
- Country: India
- State: Andhra Pradesh
- District: Kakinada
- Mandal: Peddapuram

Government
  - Type: Gram Panchayat

Area
  - Total: 1.21 km^{2} (0.47 sq mi)

Population (2011)
  - Total: 1,897
  - Density: 1,570/km^{2} (4,060/sq mi)

Languages
  - Official: Telugu
- Time zone: UTC+5:30 (IST)
- PIN: 533433

Chandramampalle is a south Indian village in Peddapuram Mandal in Kakinada district of Andhra Pradesh. It covers an area of 121 hectares. As of the year 2011, it had a population of 1,897.
