= R.B.Kothuru =

R.B.Kothuru Raya Bhupala patnam Kothuru
- village
- Country: India
- State: Andhra Pradesh
- District: Kakinada

Languages
  - Official: Telugu
- Time zone: UTC+5:30 (IST)
- PIN: 533437
- Telephone code: 08852
- Nearest city: Kakinada
- Lok Sabha constituency: Kakinada
- Vidhan Sabha constituency: Peddapuram

R.B.Kothuru is a south Indian village in Peddapuram Mandal in Kakinada district of Andhra Pradesh.
