= Valu Thimmapuram =

- village
- Interactive map of Valu Thimmapuram
- Country: India
- State: Andhra Pradesh

Languages
  - Official: Telugu
- Time zone: UTC+5:30 (IST)

Valu Thimmapuram is a south Indian village in Peddapuram Mandal in Kakinada district of Andhra Pradesh.
