= Rayabhupalapatnam =

- village
- Interactive map of Rayabhupalapatnam
- Location in Andhra Pradesh, India Rayabhupalapatnam (India)
- Coordinates: 17°02′54″N 82°06′19″E
- Country: India
- State: Andhra Pradesh

Languages
  - Official: Telugu
- Time zone: UTC+5:30 (IST)
- PIN: 533437

Rayabhupalapatnam is a south Indian village in Peddapuram Mandal in the Kakinada district of Andhra Pradesh. It has four primary schools, a high school, and an India Post branch office (BO).
