= Divili =

Village in Andhra Pradesh, India

- Village
- Interactive map of Divili
- Location within Andhra Pradesh
- Coordinates: 17°08′39″N 82°09′47″E
- Country: India
- State: Andhra Pradesh
- District: Kakinada
- Mandal: Peddapuram

Government
  - Type: Gram Panchayat

Area
  - Total: 2.13 km^{2} (0.82 sq mi)

Population (2011)
  - Total: 4,338
  - Density: 2,040/km^{2} (5,270/sq mi)

Languages
  - Official: Telugu
- Time zone: UTC+5:30 (IST)
- PIN: 533433
- 08852: STD code
- Vehicle registration: AP-5

Divili is a south Indian village in Peddapuram Mandal in Kakinada district of Andhra Pradesh. It covers an area of 213 hectares. As of the year 2011, it had a population of 4,338.
