= Shankha =

End-blown conch trumpet of Indian origin

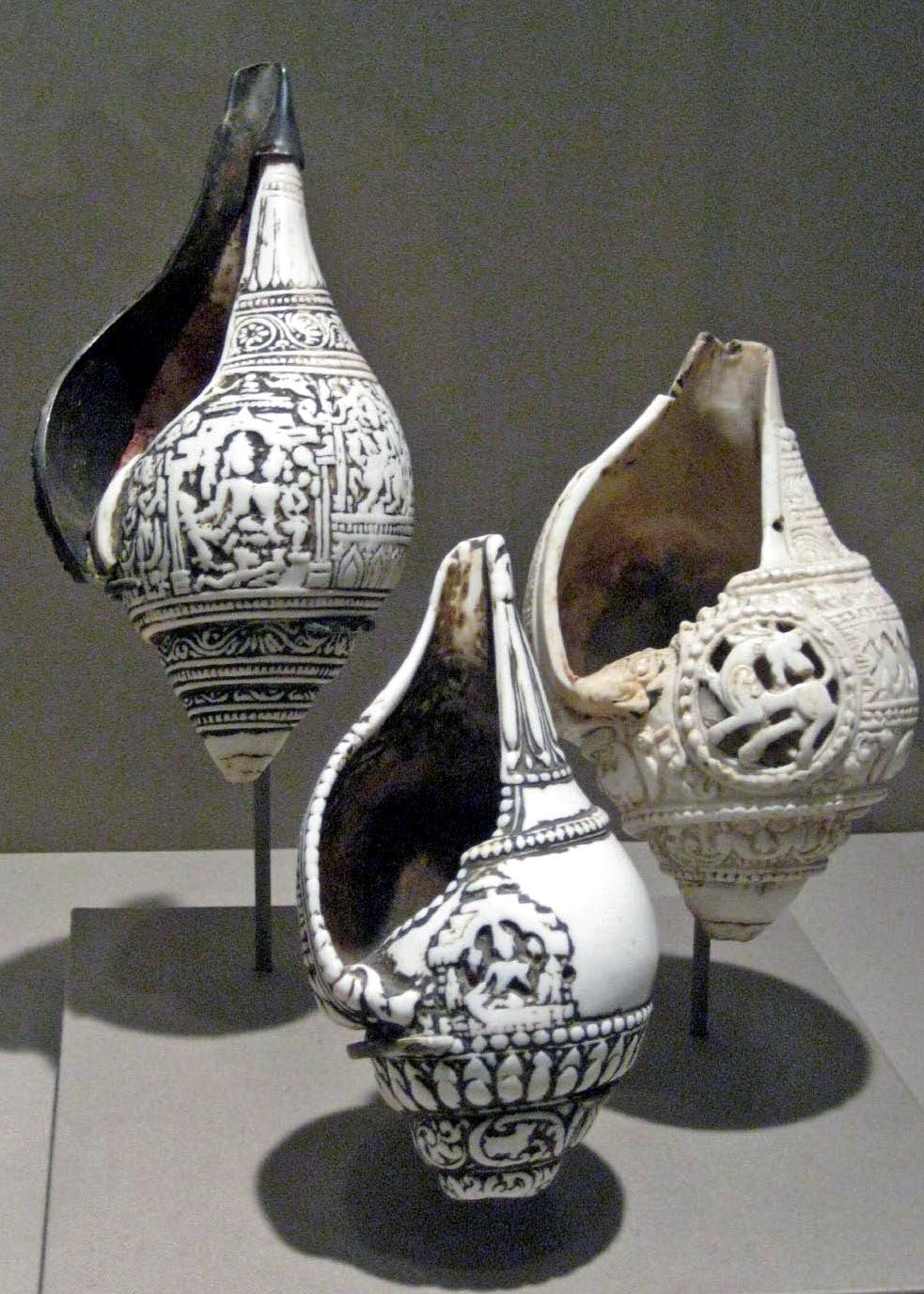
Carved conches or Vamavarta shankhas, c. 11–12th century, Pala period, India: The leftmost one is carved with the image of Lakshmi and Vishnu, and has silver additions.

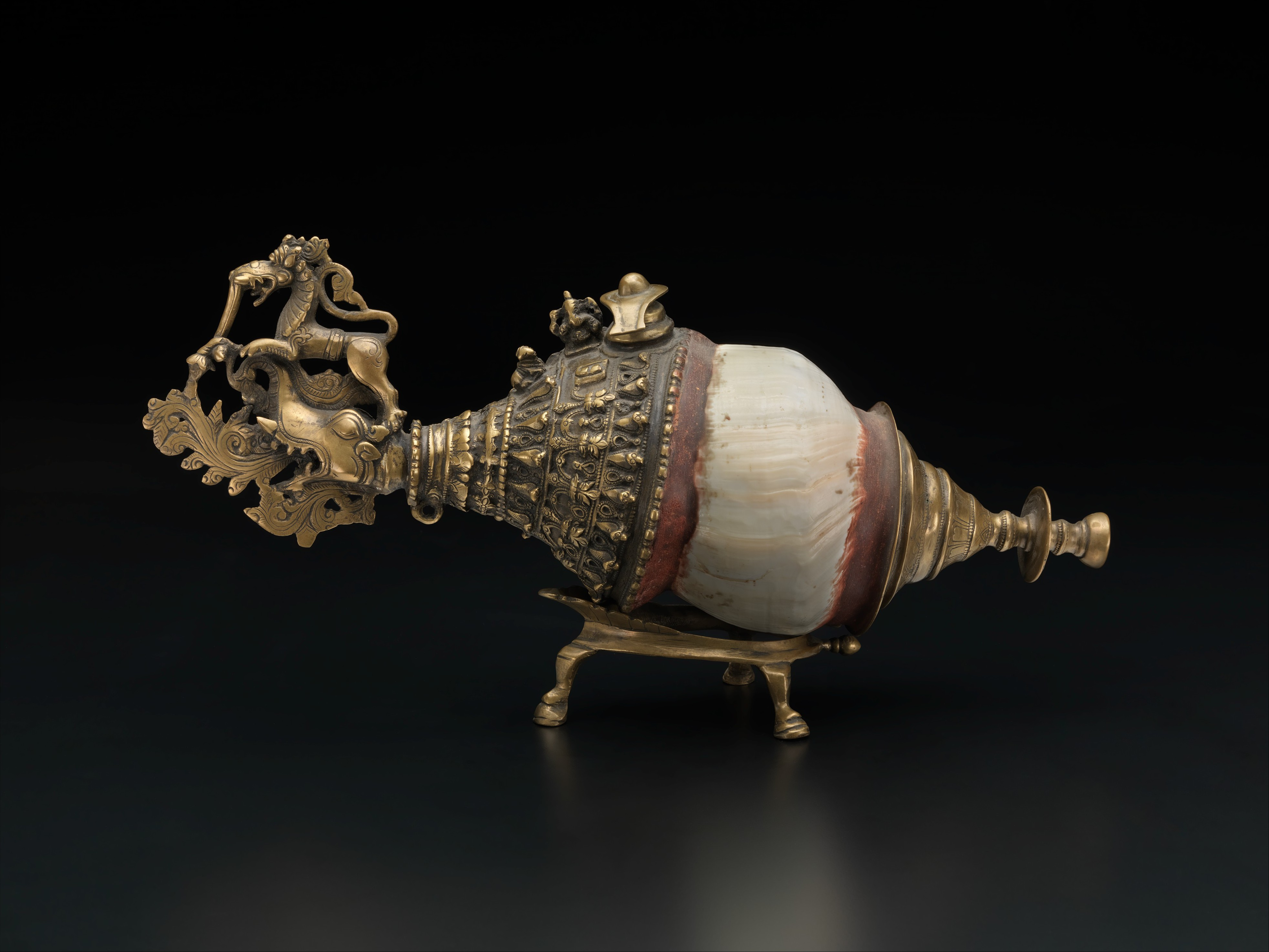
A shankha, 19th century

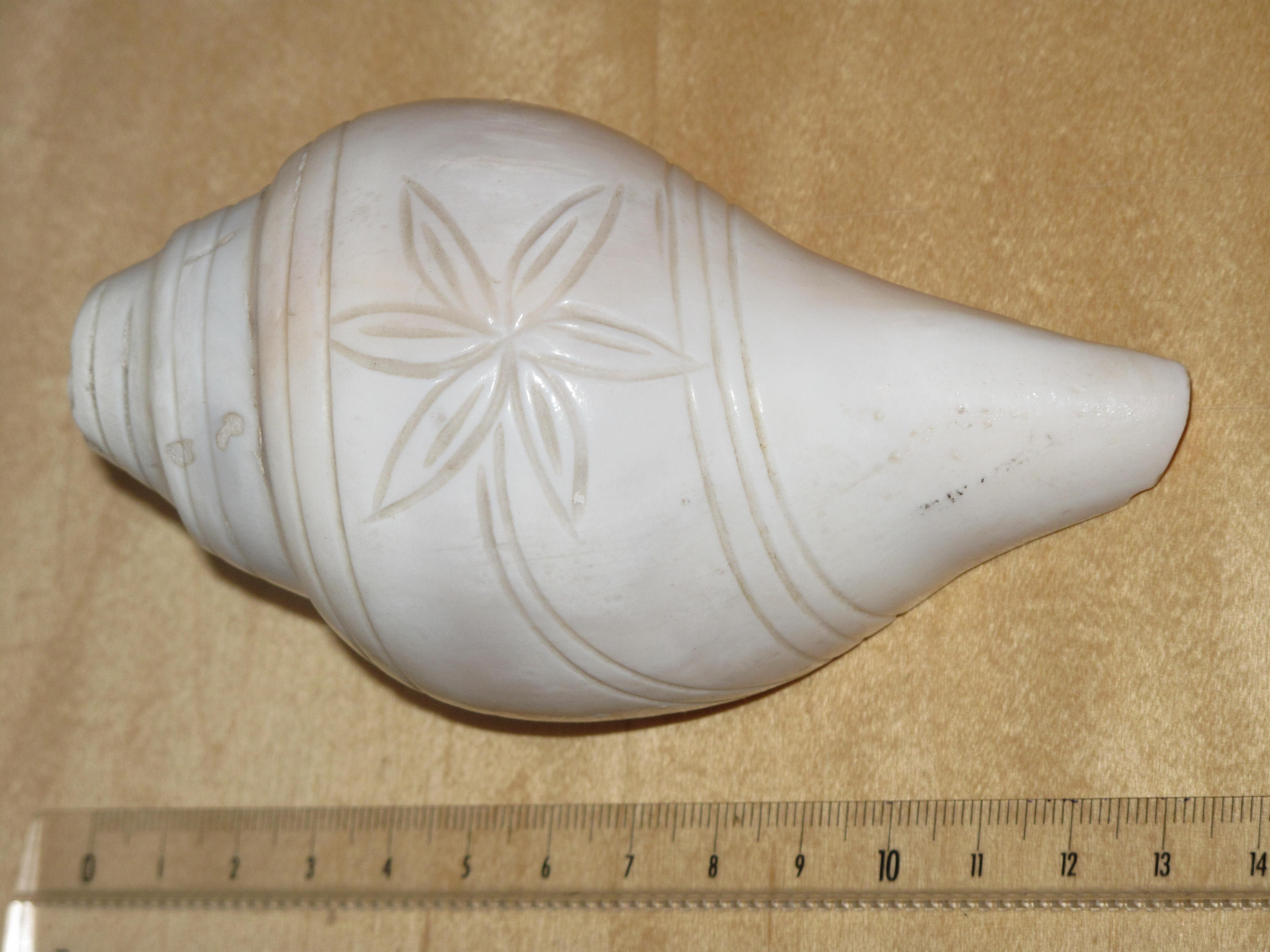
A Shankha (conch shell) with Vishnu emblem carved

A Shankha (Sanskrit: शङ्ख, romanized: śaṅkha, lit. 'conch') has religious ritual importance in Hinduism.

In Hinduism, the shankha called panchajanya is a sacred emblem of the Hindu preserver deity Vishnu. It is still used as a trumpet in Hindu ritual, and in the past was used as a war trumpet. According to Arunava Bose, "The shankha is praised in Hindu scriptures as a giver of fame, longevity and prosperity, the cleanser of sin and the abode of goddess Lakshmi, who is the goddess of prosperity and consort of Vishnu".

The shankha is displayed in Hindu art in association with Vishnu. As a symbol of water, it is associated with female fertility and serpents (nāgas).

The shankha is one of the eight auspicious symbols of Buddhism, the Ashtamangala, and represents the pervasive sound of Buddhism.

== Characteristics ==
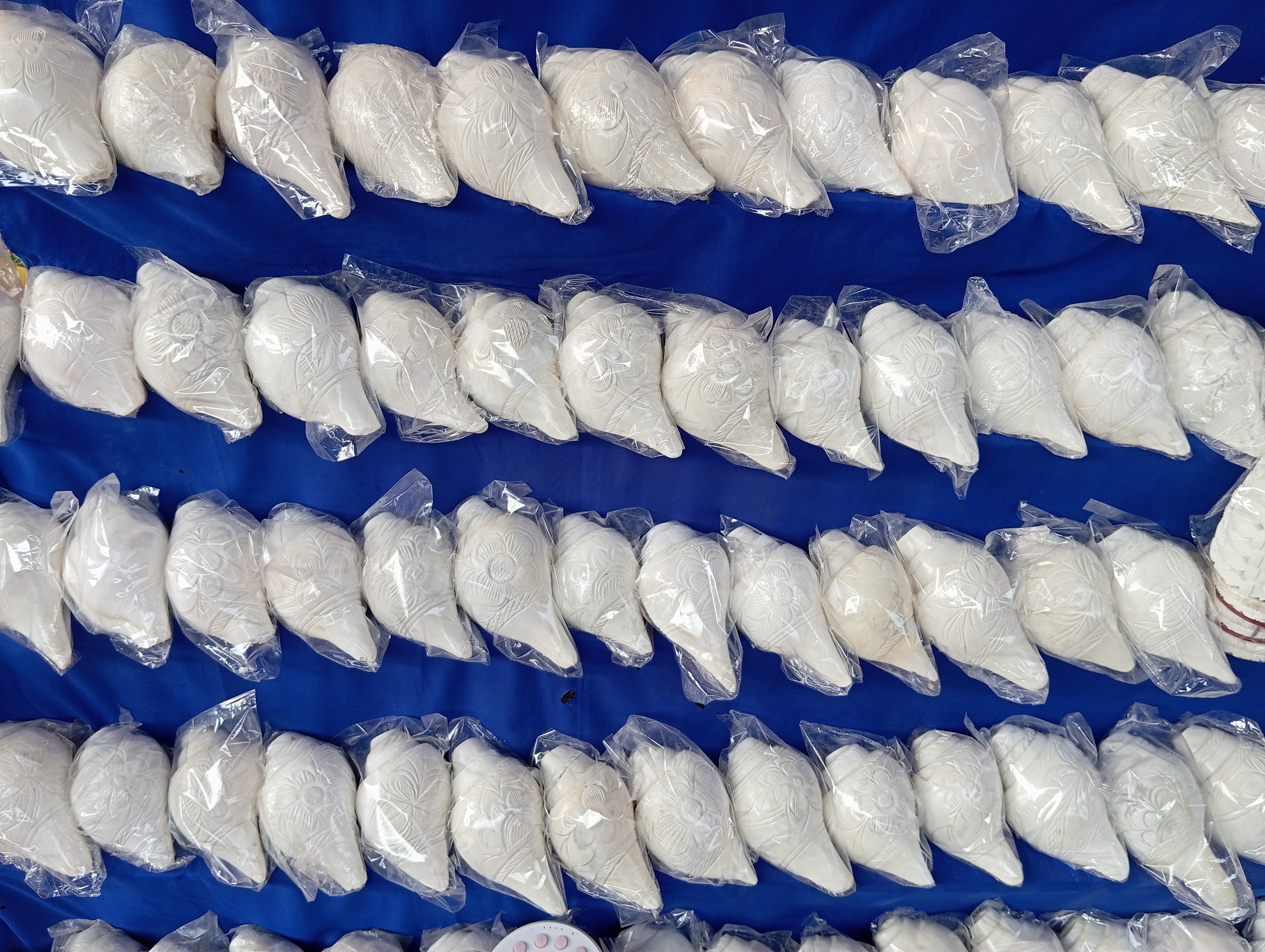
Shankha selling in Kolkata, West Bengal, India

This shell is from a sea snail species Turbinella pyrum in the family Turbinellidae. This species is found living in the Indian Ocean and surrounding seas. The shell is porcelaneous (i.e. the surface of the shell is strong, hard, shiny, and somewhat translucent, like porcelain). It could also be the shell of any suitable sea snail which had a hole made for the performer's embouchure.

The overall shape of the main body of the shell is oblong or conical. In the oblong form, it has a protuberance in the middle, but tapers at each end. The natural spout (aperture) portion (the siphonal canal) is corkscrew-shaped, while the pointed end (the spire) is twisted and tapering. Its colour is dull, and the surface is hard, brittle and translucent. Like all snail shells, the interior is hollow. The inner surfaces of the shell are very shiny, but the outer surface exhibits high tuberculation. In Hinduism, the shiny, white, soft shankha with pointed ends and heavy is the most sought after.

=== Types ===
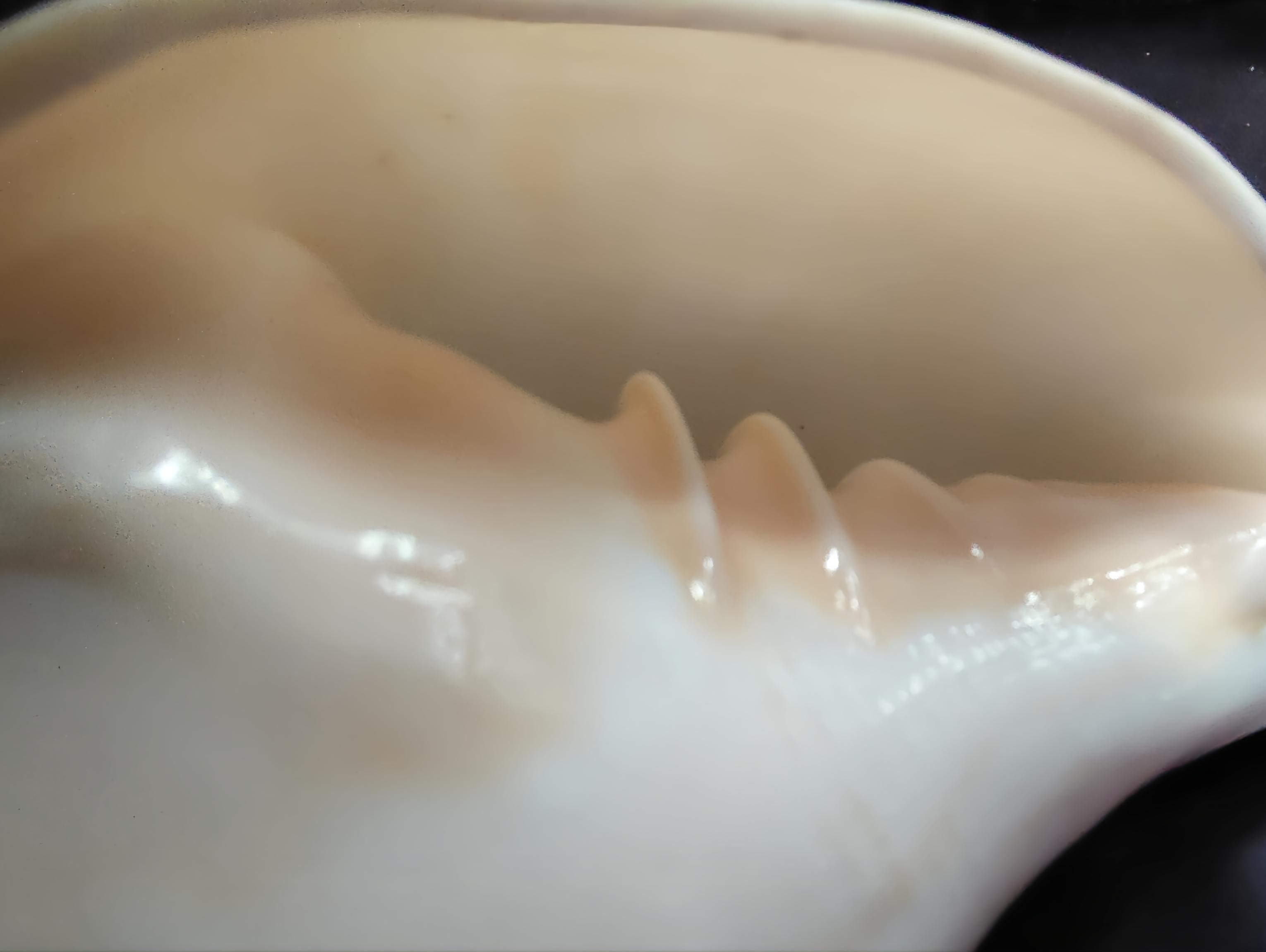
The four columellar plicae of this Turbinella pyrum represent a unique and defining morphological characteristic of the genuine Indian Sacred Chank.

In English, the shell of this species is known as the "divine conch" or the "sacred chank". It may also be simply called a "chank" or conch. There are two forms of the shanka: a more common form that is "right-turning" or dextral in pattern, and a very rarely encountered form of reverse coiling or "left-turning" or sinistral - when viewed with the spire upwards. Based on its direction of coiling, the shankha has two varieties:

- The Vamavarta also called the Edampuri in Tamil, is "left-turned" as viewed with the natural spout (aperture) portion (the siphonal canal) uppermost or conversely, "right-turning" (dextral) in pattern with the spire kept upwards. It is a "very commonly occurring dextral form of the species, where the shell coils or whorls expand in a clockwise spiral when viewed from the apex of the spire of the shell." The Vamavarta shankha represents the reversal of the laws of nature and is linked with Shiva.
- The Dakshinavarta shankha or Valampuri shankhu is a "very rare sinistral form of the species, where the shell coils or whorls expand in a counterclockwise spiral if viewed from the apex of the spire of the shell." In Hinduism, a dakshinavarta shankha is a sacred conch and symbolizes infinite space and is associated with Vishnu.

The Dakshinavarta shankha is believed to be the abode of the prosperity goddess Lakshmi – the consort of Vishnu, and hence this type of shankha is considered ideal for medicinal use. It is a very rare variety from the Indian Ocean. This type of shankha has three to seven ridges visible on the edge of the aperture and on the columella and has a special internal structure. The right spiral of this type (as viewed with the natural spout (aperture) portion upwards) reflects the motion of the planets. It is also compared with the hair whorls on the Buddha's head that spiral to the right. The long white curl between Buddha's eyebrows and the conch-like swirl of his navel are also akin to this shankha.

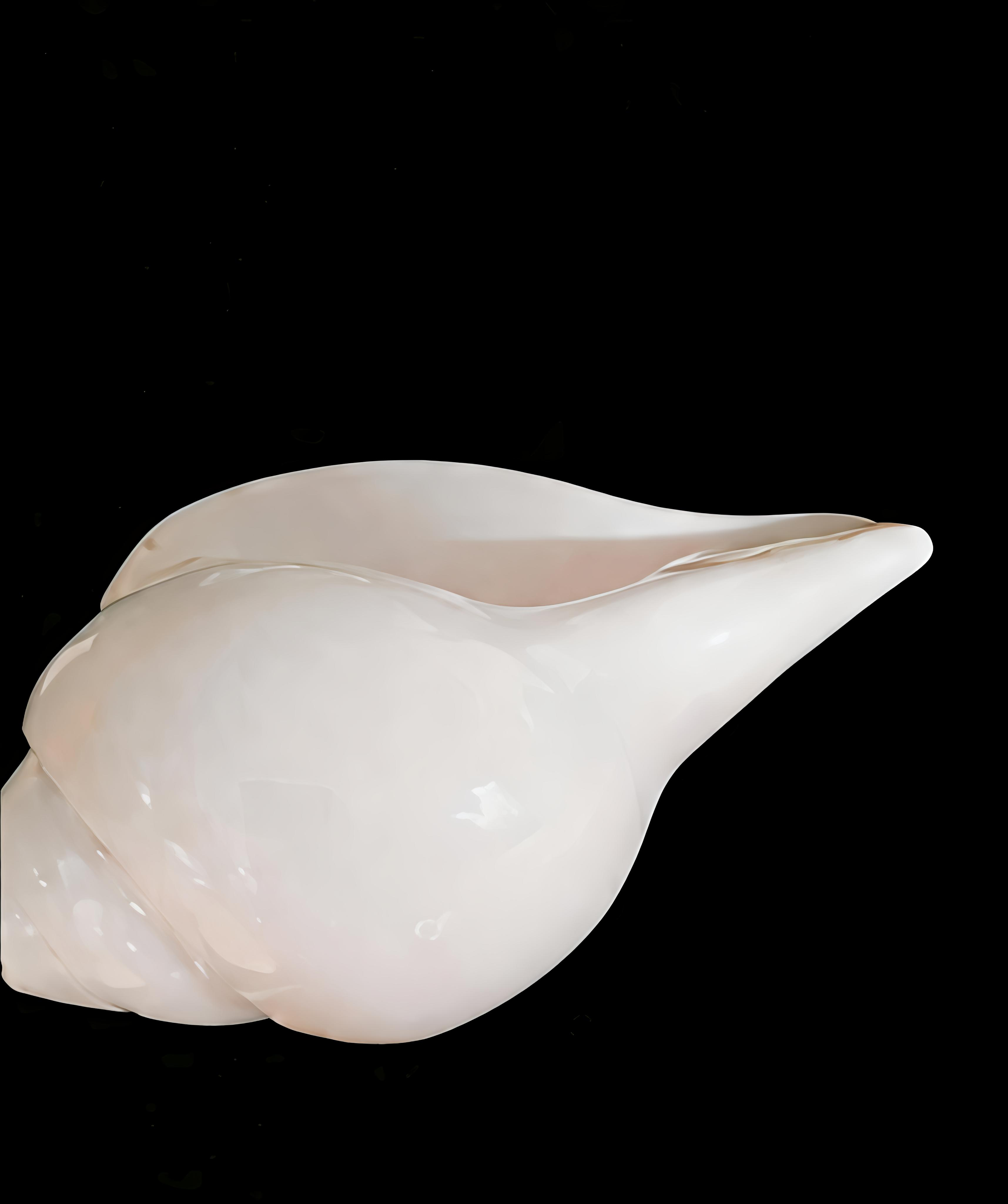
A sinistral (left-turning) Shankha displaying a distinct internal spiral morphology. Its physical characteristics align with the specific ceremonial attributes documented in traditional Vedic lithic accounts.

The Varaha Purana tells that bathing with the Dakshinavarta shankha frees one from sin. The Skanda Purana narrates that bathing Vishnu with this shankha grants freedom from sins of seven previous lives. A Dakshinavarta shankha is considered to be a rare "jewel" or ratna and is adorned with great virtues. It is also believed to grant longevity, fame and wealth proportional to its shine, whiteness and largeness. Even if such a shankha has a defect, mounting it in gold is believed to restore the virtues of the shankha.

== Uses ==
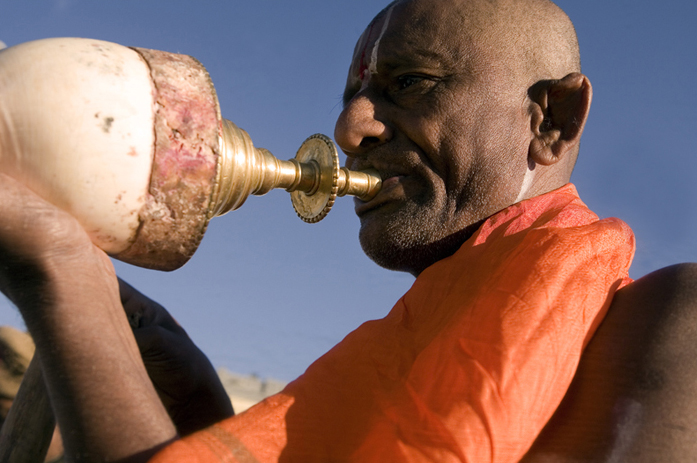
Hindu priest blowing a shankha during a puja

In its earliest references, the shankha is mentioned as a trumpet and in this form it became an emblem of Vishnu. Simultaneously, it was used as a votive offering and as a charm to keep away the dangers of the sea. It was the earliest known sound-producing agency as a manifestation of sound, and the other elements came later, hence it is regarded as the origin of the elements. It is identified with the elements themselves.

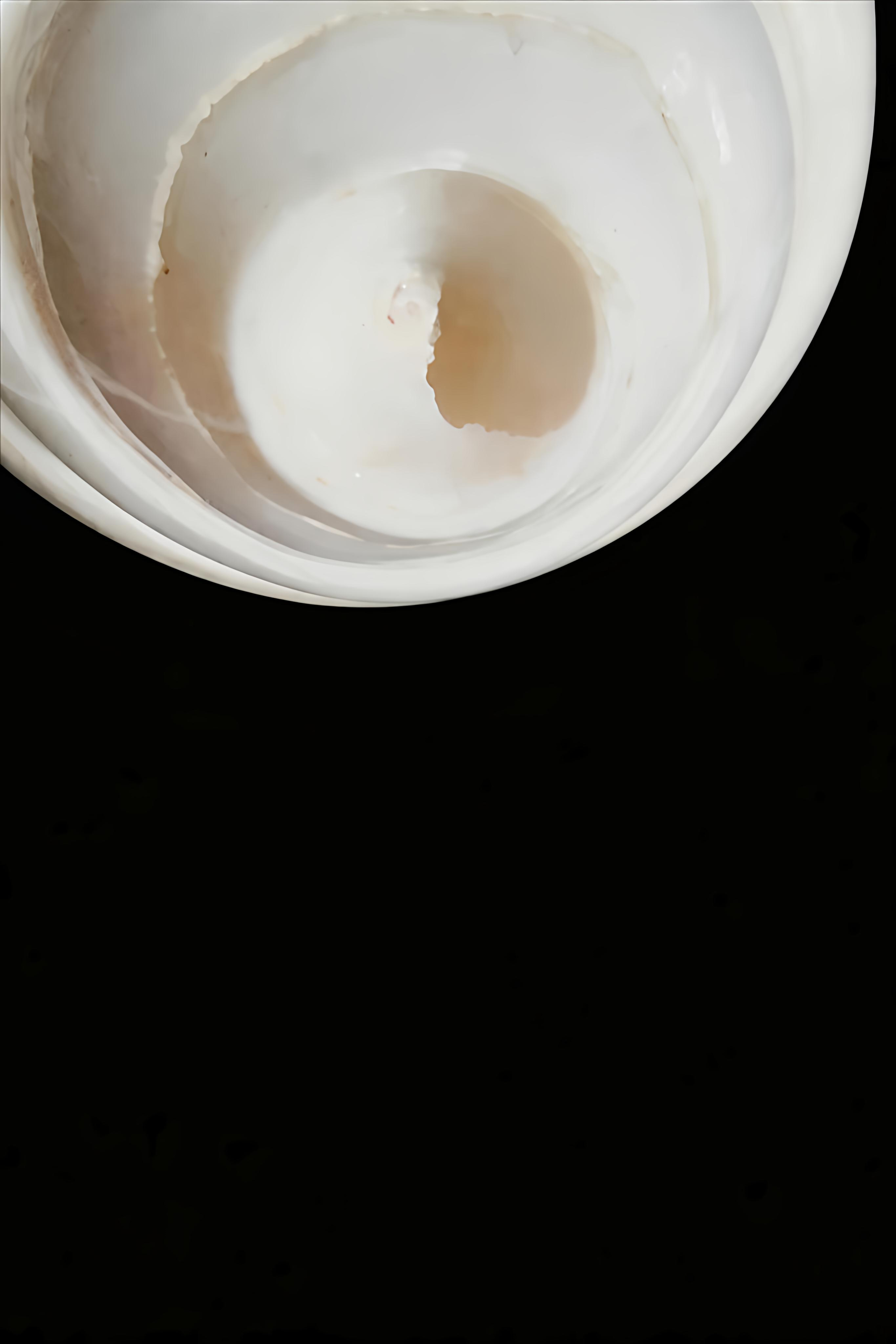
A detailed view of the ritual perforation at the apex, specifically prepared for acoustic use in ceremonial practices to produce the sacred primordial sound.

To make a trumpet or wind instrument, one drills a hole near the tip of the apex of the shankha. When air is blown through this hole, it travels through the whorls of the shankha, producing a loud, sharp, shrill sound. This sound is the reason the shankha was used as a war trumpet, to summon helpers and friends. Shanka continued to be used in battles for a long time. The sound it produced was called shankhanaad.

Nowadays, the shankha is blown at the time of worship in Hindu temples and homes, especially in the ritual of the Hindu aarti, when light is offered to the deities. The shankha is also used to bathe images of deities, especially Vishnu, and for ritual purification. No hole is drilled for these purposes, though the aperture is cut clean or rarely the whorls are cut to represent five consecutive shells with five mouths. In Tamil Nadu, shankhas are blown at funeral processions, but they are still used in temple worship.

The shankha is used as a material for making bangles, bracelets and other objects. Because of its aquatic origin and resemblance to the vulva, it has become an integral part of the Tantric rites. In view of this, its symbolism is also said to represent female fertility. Since water itself is a fertility symbol, shankha, which is an aquatic product, is recognised as symbolic of female fertility. In ancient Greece, shells, along with pearls, are mentioned as denoting sexual love and marriage, and also mother goddesses.

Different magic and sorcery items are also closely connected with this trumpet. This type of device existed long before the Buddhist era.

=== Ayurveda ===
Shankha is used in Ayurveda medicinal formulations to treat many ailments. A powder made from the shell material is used in ayurveda as a treatment for stomach ailments. It is prepared as conch shell ash, known in Sanskrit as shankha bhasma, which is prepared by soaking the shell in lime juice and calcinating in covered crucibles, 10 to 12 times, and finally reducing it to powder ash. Shankha ash contains calcium, iron and magnesium and is considered to possess antacid and digestive properties.

== Significance ==
A sacred shankha on the flag of the erstwhile Kingdom of Travancore

The sound of the shankha symbolises the sacred Om sound. Vishnu holding the conch represents him as the god of sound. The Brahma Vaivarta Purana declares that shankha is the residence of both Lakshmi and Vishnu, bathing by the waters led through a shankha is considered like bathing with all holy waters at once. Sankha Sadma Purana declares that bathing an image of Vishnu with cow milk is as virtuous as performing a million yajnas (fire sacrifices), and bathing Vishnu with Ganges river water frees one from the cycle of births. It further says "while the mere sight of the conch (shankha) dispels all sins as the Sun dispels the fog, why talk of its worship?" Padma Purana asserts the same effect of bathing Vishnu by Ganges water and milk and further adds doing so avoids evil, pouring water from a shankha on one's own head before a Vishnu image is equivalent to bathing in the pious Ganges river.

In Buddhism, the conch shell has been incorporated as one of the eight auspicious symbols, also called Ashtamangala. The sacred white conch shell (Tibetan: དུང་གྱས་འཁྱིལ, Wylie: dung gyas 'khyil), represents the elegant, deep, melodious, interpenetrating and pervasive sound of Buddhism, which awakens disciples from the deep slumber of ignorance and urges them to accomplish their own welfare and the welfare of others.

The shankha was the Royal State Emblem of Travancore and also figured on the royal flag of the Jaffna kingdom. It is also the election symbol of the Indian political party Biju Janata Dal. The shankha was also used by Sikh warriors before they started the war. This tradition is still practiced by all Nihang Singhs while doing Aarti-Aarta (Sikh hymns traditionally sung in the evening by Nihang Singhs) and is used in the festival of Hola Mohalla as well.

The shankha (representing the conch of the presiding deity of Padmanabhaswamy Temple is a part of the state emblem of the Indian state of Kerala. The symbol was derived from the erstwhile emblems of the Indian princely state of Travancore, and the Kingdom of Cochin.

== Hindu iconography ==
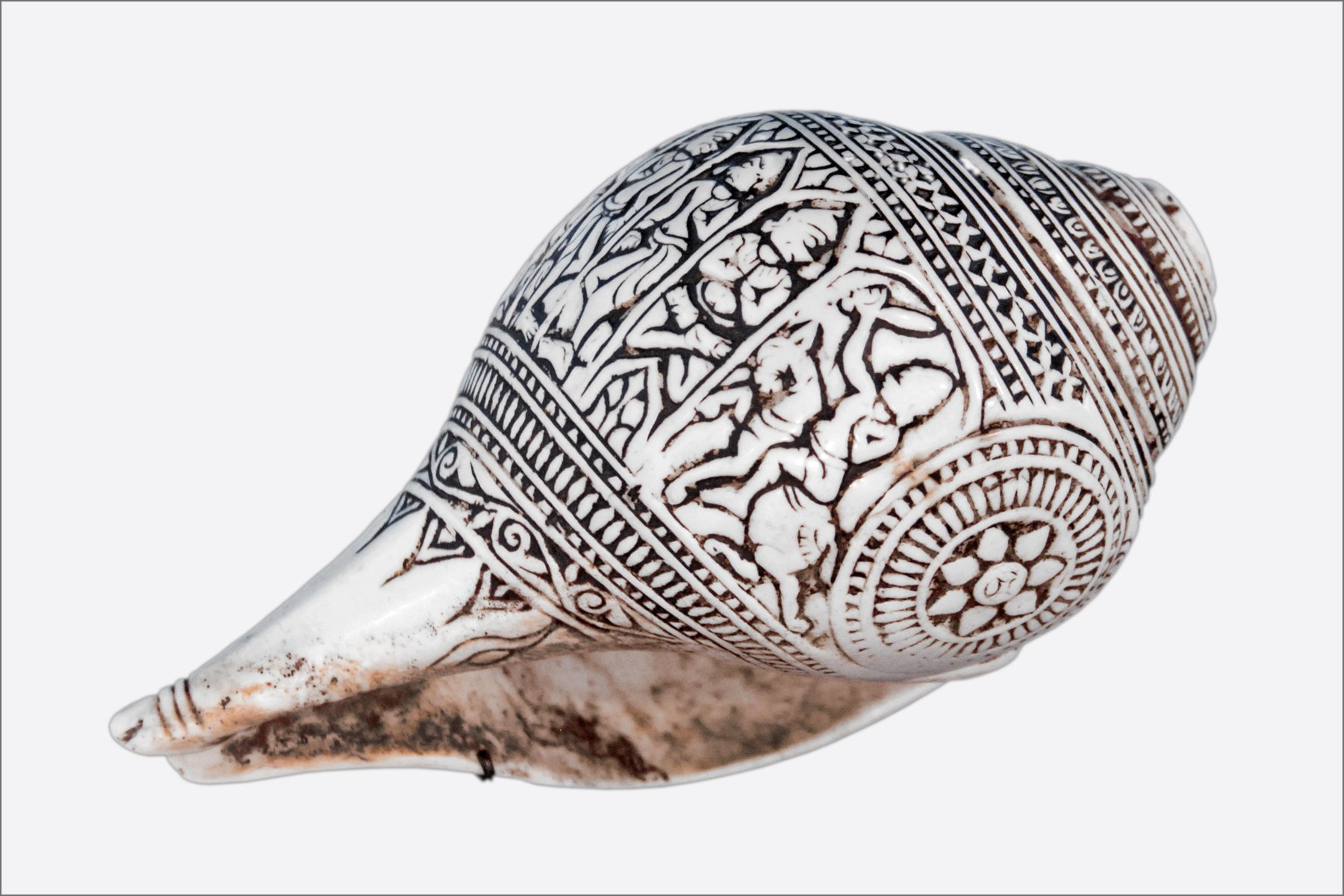
A shankha carved

Shankha is one of the main attributes of Vishnu. Vishnu's images, either in sitting or standing posture, show him holding the shankha usually in his left upper hand, while Sudarshana Chakra (chakra – discus), gada (mace) and padma (lotus flower) decorate his upper right, the lower left and lower right hands, respectively.

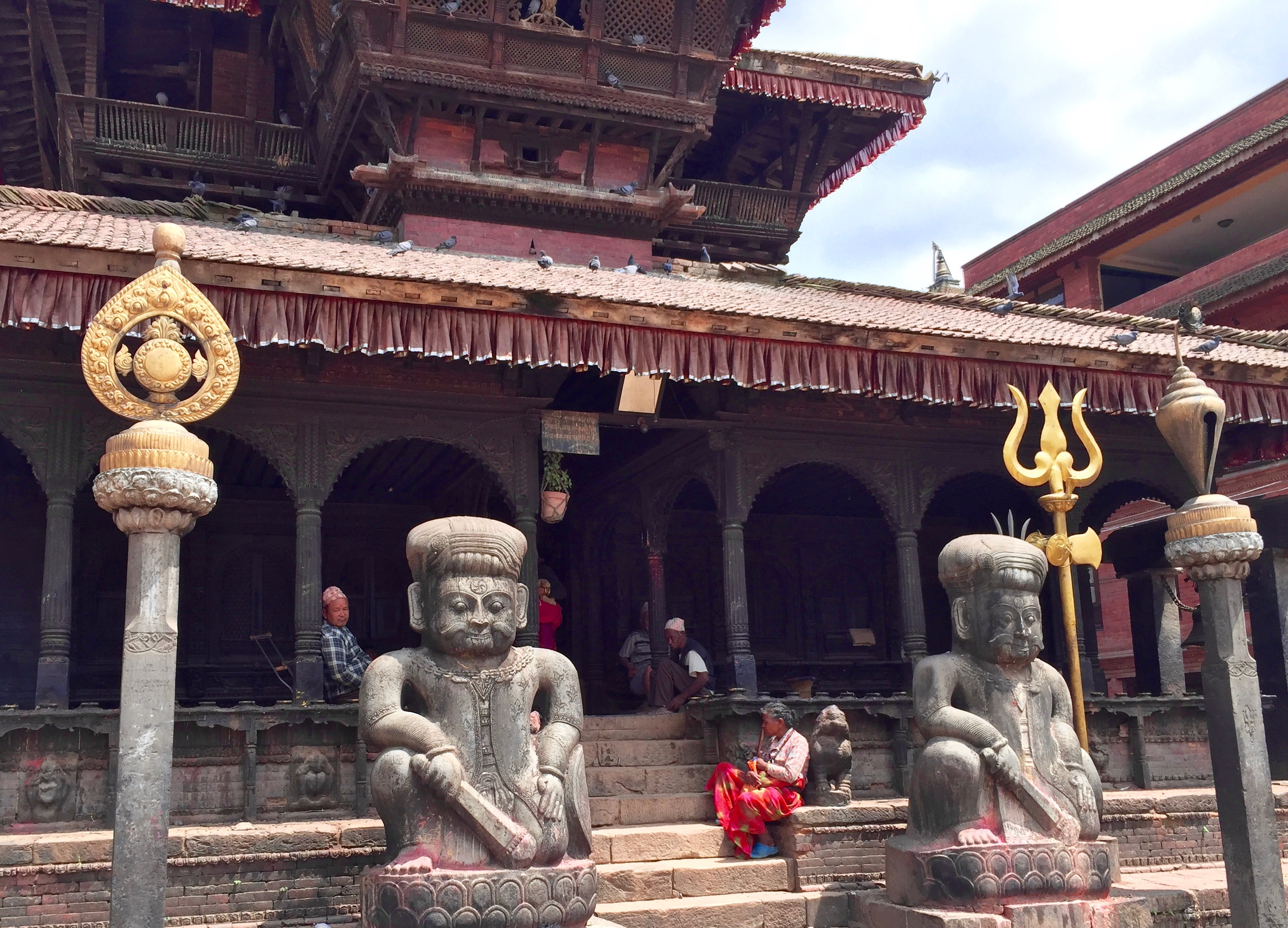
The shankha on the right is the icon for Vishnu at the Dattatreya temple, Bhaktapur Nepal

Avatars of Vishnu like Matsya, Kurma, Varaha, and Narasimha are also depicted holding the shankha, along with the other attributes of Vishnu. Krishna – avatar of Vishnu is described possessing a shankha called Panchajanya. Regional Vishnu forms like Jagannath and Vithoba may be also pictured holding the shankha. Besides Vishnu, other deities are also pictured holding the shankha. These include the sun god Surya, Indra – the king of heaven and god of rain the war god Kartikeya, the goddess Vaishnavi and the warrior goddess Durga. Similarly, Gaja Lakshmi statues show Lakshmi holding a shankha in the right hand and lotus on the other.

Sometimes, the shankha of Vishnu is personified as Ayudhapurusha "weapon-man" in the sculpture and depicted as a man standing beside Vishnu or his avatars. This subordinate figure is called the Shankhapurusha who is depicted holding a shankha in both the hands. Temple pillars, walls, gopurams (towers), basements and elsewhere in the temple, sculpted depictions of the shankha and chakra – the emblems of Vishnu – are seen. The city of Puri also known as Shankha-kshetra is sometimes pictured as a shankha or conch in art with the Jagannath temple at its centre.

The shanka is one of the four symbols found on a shaligram, an iconographic fossil stone particularly found in the Gandaki River in Nepal which is worshipped by Hindus as a representative of Vishnu.

== Hindu theology ==
A Hindu legend in the Brahma Vaivarta Purana recalls the creation of conchs: Shiva flung a trident towards the asuras, burning them instantaneously. Their ashes flew in the sea creating conchs. Shankha is believed to be a brother of Lakshmi as both of them were born from the sea. A legend describes an asura named Shankhasura, who was killed by Vishnu's fish avatar, Matsya.

The conch Panchajanya is one of the many materials that emerged during the churning of the ocean.

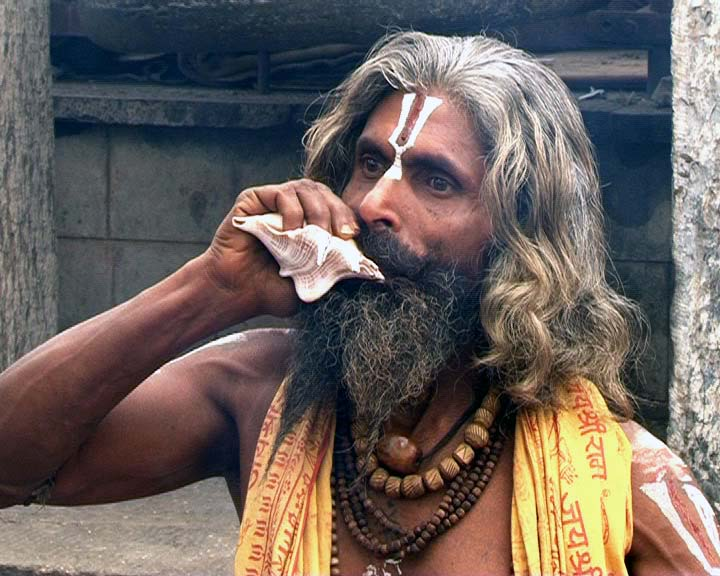
A sadhu sounding the shankha

In the Hindu epics of the Ramayana and the Mahabharata, the symbol of shankha is widely adopted. In the Ramayana epic, Lakshmana, Bharata and Shatrughna are considered part-incarnations of Shesha, Sudarshana Chakra, and Panchajanya, respectively, while Rama, their eldest brother, is considered one of the Dashavatara, the ten avatars of Vishnu.

During the Kurukshetra War, Krishna, as the charioteer of the Pandava prince and a protagonist of the epic – Arjuna – resounds the Panchajanya to declare war. Panchajanya in Sanskrit means 'having control over the five classes of beings'. All five Pandava brothers are described having their own shankhas. Yudhishthira, Bhima, Arjuna, Nakula and Sahadeva are described to possess shankhas named Ananta-Vijaya, Poundra-Khadga, Devadatta, Sughosha and Mani-pushpaka, respectively.

In the Bhagavad Gita, the name of different Shankhas of Pandavas and Kauravas are mentioned:

Then, Lord Krsna blew His conchshell, called Pancajanya; Arjuna blew his, the Devadatta; and Bhima, the voracious eater and performer of Herculean tasks, blew his terrific conchshell called Paundram

— Bhagavad Gita, Chapter 1, Verse 15

King Yudhisthira, the son of Kunti, blew his conchshell, the Anantavijaya, and Nakula and Sahadeva blew the Sughosa and Manipuspaka. That great archer the King of Kasi, the great fighter Sikhandi, Dhrstadyumna, Virata and the unconquerable Satyaki, Drupada, the sons of Draupadi, and the others, O King, such as the son of Subhadra, greatly armed, all blew their respective conchshells

— Bhagavad Gita, Chapter 1, Verse 16–18

== Association with nāgas ==
Because of the association of the shankha with water, nāgas (serpents) are often named after the shankha. The list of Nāgas in the Mahabharata, Harivamsha and Bhagavata Purana include Shankha, Mahashankha, Shankhapala, and Shankachuda. The last two are also mentioned in the Buddhist Jataka Tales and the Jimutavahana. A legend states that while using a shankha as part of meditative ritual, a sadhu blew his shankha in the forest of village Keoli and a snake crept out of it. The snake directed the sadhu that he should be worshipped as Nāga Devata (Serpent God) and since then it has been known as Shanku Naga. Similar legends are narrated at many other places in Kullu district in Himachal Pradesh.

== See also ==
- Dakshinavarti shankha
- Melo melo
