= Peddapuram mandal =

- Mandal
- Interactive Map Outlining mandal
- Location in Andhra Pradesh, India
- Coordinates: 17.08°N 82.13°E
- Country: India
- State: Andhra Pradesh
- District: Kakinada

Area
  - Total: 87.33 km^{2} (33.72 sq mi)

Population (2011)
  - Total: 123,399
  - Density: 1,413/km^{2} (3,660/sq mi)

Languages
  - Official: Telugu
- Time zone: UTC+5:30 (IST)

Peddapuram mandal is one of the 21 mandals in Kakinada district of the state of Andhra Pradesh, India. Its headquarters are located at Peddapuram. The mandal is bounded by Gandepalle, Jaggampeta, Kirlampudi, Rangampeta, Samalkota and Pithapuram mandals.

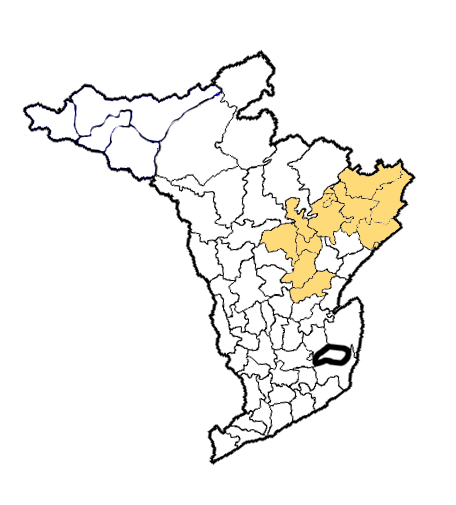
Peddapuram Revenue division in Kakinada district

== Demographics ==
As of 2011 census, the mandal had a population of 123,399. The total population constitute, 61,713 males and 61,686 females —a sex ratio of 999 females per 1000 males. 12,673 children are in the age group of 0–6 years, of which 6,532 are boys and 6,141 are girls —a ratio of 940 per 1000. The average literacy rate stands at 67.75% with 75,019 literates.

== Towns and villages ==
Kattamuru is the most populated village and Sirivada is the least populated settlement in the mandal. As of 2011 census, the mandal has 8 settlements, that includes:

1. Anuru
2. Chadalada
3. Chandramampalle
4. Chinabrahmadevam
5. Divili
6. G. Ragampeta
7. Gorinta
8. Gudivada
9. J. Thimmapuram
10. Kandrakota
11. Kattamuru
12. Marlava
13. Pulimeru
14. Rayabhupalapatnam [R.B.PATNAM]
15. Rayabhupala kotturu [R.B.KOTTURU]
16. Sirivada
17. Tatiparthi
18. Tirupati
19. Ulimeswaram
20. Vadlamuru
21. Valuthimmapuram

Sources:

- Census India 2011 (sub districts)
