= List of villages in Vizianagaram district =

This is a list of villages in Vizianagaram district, a district in the Coastal Andhra region of Andhra Pradesh state in southern India before district restructure in 2022. Vizianagaram is the administrative headquarters of the district. For the current list of villages with articles see Category:Villages in Vizianagaram district.

== A–D ==
- Ajjada
- Alamanda
- Andra
- Arikathota
- Badangi
- Balijipeta
- Barli
- Basangi
- Bhogapuram
- Bonangi
- Bondapalli
- Budathanapalli Rajeru
- Busayavalasa
- Challapeta
- Chemudu
- Chintada
- Chintapalli
- Chollangipeta
- Dattirajeru
- Denkada
- Dharmavaram
- Donkinavalasa
- Duppalapudi

== G ==
- Gajularega
- Gangada
- Ganivada
- Gantyada
- Garbham
- Garudabilli
- Garugubilli
- Goluguvalasa
- Gotlam
- Govindapuram
- Gumada
- Gummalaxmipuram
- Gurla
- Gurla Thammirajupeta

== J–L ==
- Jagannadapuram
- Jakkuva
- Jami
- Jiyyammavalasa
- K. L. Puram
- Kagam
- Kallepalli Rega
- Kantakapalli
- Karakam
- Karivalasa
- Kasipatnam
- Koduru
- Komarada
- Komatipalli
- Konada
- Kondavelagada
- Korukonda
- Kota Gandredu
- Kottakki
- Krishnapuram
- Kumili
- Kunayavalasa
- Kuneru
- Kurupam
- Lakkavarapukota
- Lakkidam

== M–N ==
- Makkuva
- Mamidipalli
- Mentada
- Merakamudidam
- Merangi
- Mettapalli
- Moida
- Mondemkhallu
- Mrutyunjaya Nagaram
- Naguru
- Naiduvalasa
- Nandigam
- Narayanappavalasa
- Narayanapuram
- Narsipuram
- Natavalasa
- Neelakantapuram
- Neelavathi

== P–S ==
- Pachipenta
- Palagara
- Paradhi
- Parannavalasa
- Peda Ankalam
- Peda Bondapalli
- Peda Manapuram
- Pedanadipalli
- Pedatadivada
- Piridi
- Puritipenta
- Pusapatirega
- Rajapulova
- Ramabhadrapuram
- Ramachandra puram
- Ramateertham
- Ravipalli
- Rellivalasa
- Rompilli
- S Burjavalasa
- Sambara
- Saripalli
- Sathivada
- Sivadavalasa
- Sivaramapuram
- Somalingapuram

== T–V ==
- Tarapuram
- Tatipudi
- Therlam
- Thondrangi
- Thotapalli
- Uttarapalli
- Uttaravalli
- Vengapuram
- Vepada
