= Visakhapatnam Metropolitan Region =

Visakhapatnam Metropolitan Region Greater Visakhapatnam
- Metropolitan Area
- Country: India
- State: Andhra Pradesh
- Districts: Visakhapatnam, Vizianagaram, Anakapalli

Area
  - Metro: 7,328.86 km^{2} (2,829.69 sq mi)

Population (2011)
  - Metro: 60.7
- Time zone: UTC+5.30 (IST)
- Nominal GDP(2024-25): ₹238,170 crore (equivalent to ₹2.5 trillion or US$26 billion in 2026)
- Website: vmrda.gov.in

Visakhapatnam Metropolitan Region is the metropolitan area covered by the city of Visakhapatnam in the Indian state of Andhra Pradesh. The entire region is spread over the districts of Visakhapatnam, Vizianagaram and Anakapalli. Under the jurisdiction of Visakhapatnam Metropolitan Region Development Authority, it covers an area of 7,328.86 km^{2} (2,829.69 sq mi) and has a population over of 60.7 lakhs according to 2011 census.

== History ==
Prior to VUDA, the Town Planning Trust had existed since 1962 that implemented developmental activities in and around Visakhapatnam. The TPT was upgraded and Visakhapatnam Urban Development Authority was constituted in 1978 with its jurisdiction extending over Visakhapatnam Municipal Corporation and four municipal towns namely Vizianagaram, Bheemunipatnam, Gajuwaka and Anakapalli, comprising an area of 1,721 km^{2}. Later, the jurisdiction of VUDA had been increased from 1,721 km^{2} (664 sq mi) to 5,563 km^{2} (2,148 sq mi) area in 2008.

Due to the rapid increase in urbanization the existing VUDA was upgraded to VMRDA by expanding its jurisdiction from 5,563 km^{2} (2,148 sq mi) to 6,760 km^{2} (2,610 sq mi). Spread over four districts including Srikakulam, Vizianagaram, Visakhapatnam and East Godavari. But due to the dissent from the local people's representatives of East Godavari, the state government excluded East Godavari from the VMRDA and officially notified the development area as 6,501.65 km^{2} (2,510.30 sq mi) in September 2018. On 13 February 2019, the Government of Andhra Pradesh constituted Srikakulam Urban Development Authority. So, the VMRDA loses 1,628 km^{2} (629 sq mi) of Srikakulam district to new urban development body. Then again, the development area was restricted to 4,873.38 km^{2} (1,881.62 sq mi). Later, with the inclusion of Merakamudidam mandal of Vizianagaram district in VMRDA, the range was increased to 5,048.67 km^{2} (1,949.30 sq mi).

On 23 February 2021, VMRDA has taken the remaining 13 non-Agency mandals under its jurisdiction, taking its total to 52 mandals. This decision comes in light of the rapid urbanisation towards the western corridors of Visakhapatnam city. As per sources, this inclusion of mandals is expected to reduce pressure on the urban infrastructure of the city, ensuring planned development in the fringe areas. With this new inclusion, the jurisdiction of VMRDA has extended to a total of 7,328.86 km^{2} (2,829.69 sq mi).

== Jurisdiction ==
Under the jurisdiction of VMRDA, the Visakhapatnam Metropolitan Region (VMR), comprises, Visakhapatnam city and the districts Anakapalli, Vizianagaram and Visakhapatnam. It is spread over an area of 7,328.86 km^{2} (2,829.69 sq mi) and has a population of 40.7 lakhs according to 2011 census.

The below table list the urban areas of VMR:

Jurisdiction
Settlement Type	Name	Total
Municipal Corporations	GVMC, Vizianagaram	2
Municipalities	Yelamanchili, Narsipatnam	2
Nagar Panchayat	Nellimarla	1

The below table lists the mandals of VMR:

VMRDA Areas
District	Mandals	No.of mandals
Vizianagaram	Cheepurupalli, Garividi, Gurla, Gajapathinagaram, Bondapalli, Gantyada, Srungavarapukota, Vepada, Lakkavarapukota, Kothavalasa, Jami, Vizianagaram, Nellimarla, Pusapatirega, Denkada, Bhogapuram, Merakamudidam	17
Visakhapatnam	Seethammadhara, Pendurthi, Maharanipeta, Visakhapatnam (rural), Anandapuram, Gopalapatnam, Mulagada, Gajuwaka, Pedagantyada, Bheemunipatnam, Padmanabham,	11
Anakapalli	Sabbavaram, Parawada, Anakapalli, Kasimkota, Munagapaka, Atchutapuram, Rambilli, Yelamanchili, S.Rayavaram, Nakkapalli, Payakaraopeta, Narsipatnam, Golugonda, Kotauratla, Nathavaram, Chodavaram, Cheedikada, Butchayyapeta, Makavarapalem, Rolugunta, Madugula, Ravikamatham, Devarapalli, K.Kotapadu	24

== See also ==
- List of metropolitan areas in India
