= Parvathipuram revenue division =

- revenue division in Parvathipuram Manyam district
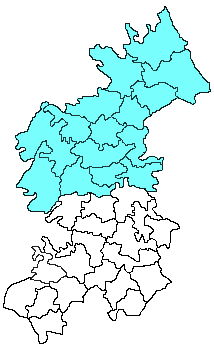
- Parvathipuram revenue division in Vizianagaram district
- Country: India
- State: Andhra Pradesh
- District: Parvathipuram Manyam

Parvathipuram revenue division (or Parvathipuram division) is an administrative division in the Parvathipuram Manyam district of the Indian state of Andhra Pradesh. It is one of the two revenue divisions in the district with eight mandals under its administration. The divisional headquarters are located at Parvathipuram.

== Administration ==
The 8 mandals administered under the revenue division are:

| No. | Mandals |
|---|---|
| 1 | Parvathipuram |
| 2 | Seethanagaram |
| 3 | Balijipeta |
| 4 | Salur |
| 5 | Pachipenta |
| 6 | Makkuva |
| 7 | Komarada |
| 8 | Garugubilli |

== See also ==
- List of revenue divisions in Andhra Pradesh
- List of mandals in Andhra Pradesh
