= Palakonda revenue division =

- revenue division in Parvathipuram Manyam district
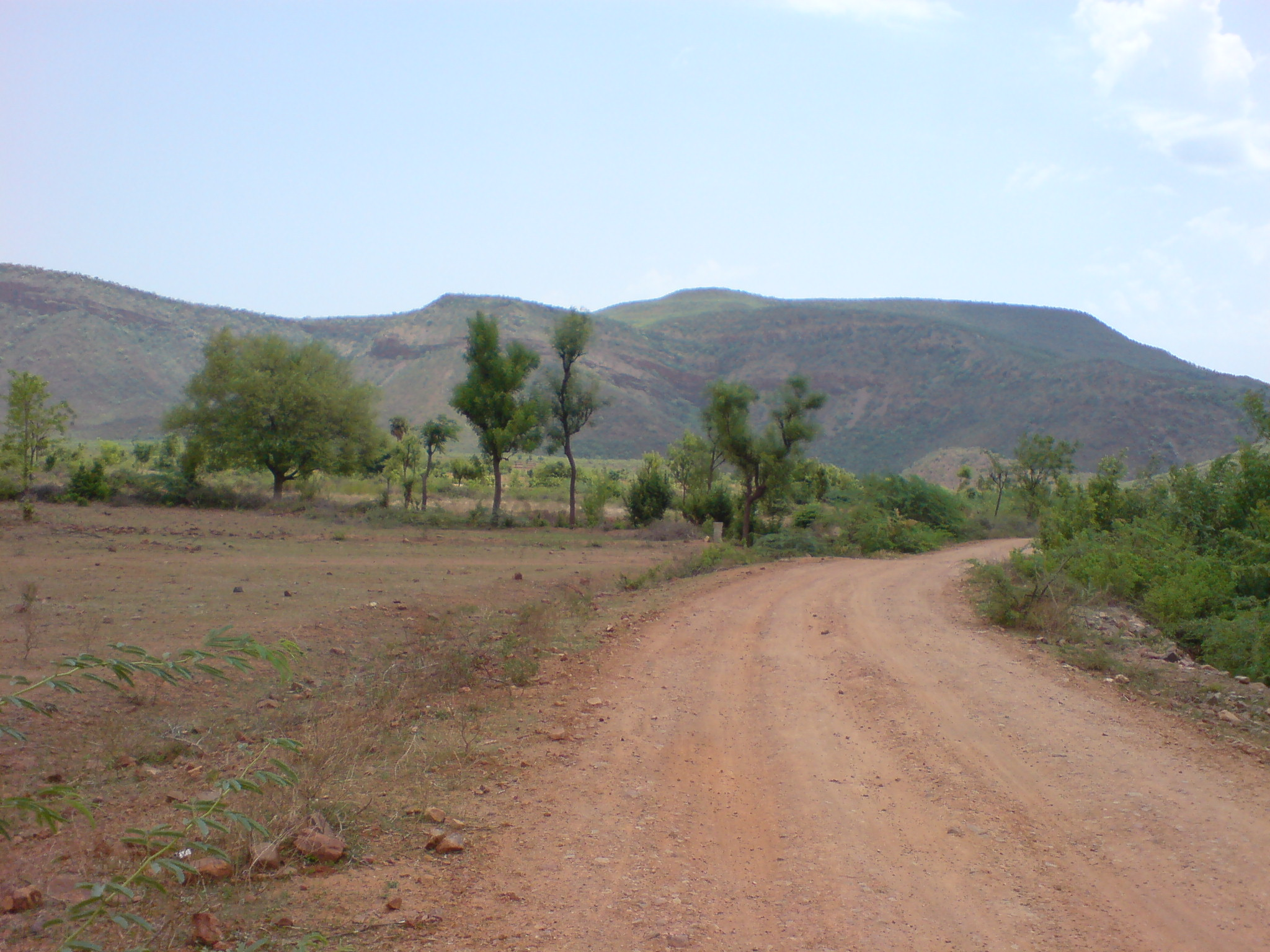
- Hills near Palakonda

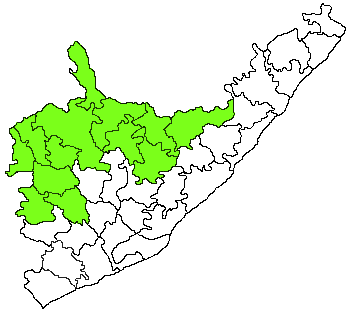
- Palalkonda revenue division in Srikakulam district
- Country: India
- State: Andhra Pradesh
- District: Parvathipuram Manyam

Population (2011)
  - Total: 798,407

Palakonda revenue division (or Palakonda division) is an administrative division in the Parvathipuram Manyam district of the Indian state of Andhra Pradesh. It is one of the two revenue divisions in the district with seven mandals under its administration. The divisional headquarters are located at Palakonda.

== Administration ==
The 7 mandals administered under the revenue division are:

No.	Mandal
1	Jiyyammavalasa
2	Gummalaxmipuram
3	Kurupam
4	Palakonda
5	Seethampeta, Srikakulam
6	Bhamini
7	Veeraghattam

== Demographics ==
The division has a population of 7,98,407. 7,28,847 is rural and 69,560 urban. Scheduled Castes and Scheduled Tribes make up 13.21% and 14.66% of the population respectively.

98.31% of the population is Hindu and 1.15% Christian.

At the time of the 2011 census, 91.68% of the population spoke Telugu, 5.28% Saora and 2.42% Odia as their first language.

== See also ==
- List of revenue divisions in Andhra Pradesh
- List of mandals in Andhra Pradesh
