= Tatipudi =

Tatipudi may refer to places in India:

- Tatipudi, Vizianagaram, a village in Andhra Pradesh

- Tatipudi Dam, a dam in Andhra Pradesh

- Tatipudi, Khammam, a village in Andhra Pradesh
