= Peda Ankalam =

- village
- Interactive map of Peda Ankalam
- Location in Andhra Pradesh, India
- Country: India
- State: Andhra Pradesh

Population (2001)
  - Total: 1,173

Languages
  - Official: Telugu
- Time zone: UTC+5:30 (IST)

Pedankalam or Peda Ankalam is a village and panchayat in Seethanagaram mandal of Parvathipuram Manyam district in Andhra Pradesh, India.

== Pedankalam Anicut ==
Peda Ankalam Anicut was constructed across River Suvarnamukhi, a tributary of River Nagavali near Pedankalam village. The project is aimed to irrigate a total ayacut of 8,257 acres in the (i) Vizianagaram district (Balijipeta Mandal) - 6,617 Acres and (ii) Srikakulam district (Vangara Mandal) – 1,640 acres (660 ha)

The project was constructed during 1975–79. It utilizes 1.073 TMC of the available water. The project cost is ₹ 240 Lakhs.

== Demographics ==
According to Indian census, 2001, the demographic details of Pedankalam village is as follows:

- Total Population: 1,173 in 264 Households
- Male Population: 577 and Female Population: 596
- Children Under 6-years of age: 143 (Boys - 70 and Girls - 73)
- Total Literates: 408
