= Raju zamindaris =

This is a list of zamindaris controlled by members of the Raju caste of Andhra Pradesh, India, before such roles were abolished in 1952.

- Mogalthur Kalidindi Zamindari clan and a mud fort connected to the ancient Vishnukundina dynasty. The Zamindari territory expands to West Godavari and parts of Krishna District. The biggest of the ten forts which has survived the ravages of time is the Mogalturru Fort in which the family of the erstwhile kingdom still lives.
- Merangi Satrucharla clan
- Padmanabham Raja Sagi clan of Pandrangi Village in Padmanabham Mandal of Visakhapatnam District in Andhra Pradesh(Raja Sagi Padmanabha Raju). Founder of this family was Raja Sagi Raja Ramachandra Raju. They were also one of the descendants of the ancient Chagi Dynasty.
