= Talada, Parvathipuram Manyam district =

Talada is a village in Seethampeta mandal, Parvathipuram Manyam district. It borders Gajapati District of Odisha. Talada has a population of 400-500 people, many of whom are farmers.
