= Mrityunjay =

Mrityunjay or Mrutyunjaya may refer to:

- Shiva, a major Hindu deity, known by the epithet Mrityunjay (victor over death)
  - Mahamrityunjaya Mantra, mantra dedicated to him
  - Mrityunjay Mahadev Mandir, a Shiva temple in Varanasi, Uttar Pradesh, India
- Mrityunjay, a Jnanpith Award-winning 1979 Assamese-language novel by Birendra Kumar Bhattacharya
- Mrityunjay, a Marathi-language novel by Shivaji Sawant
- Mrityunjay (TV series), a 1996 Indian television series directed by Chandraprakash Dwivedi
- Mrityunjay Athreya, Indian management advisor
- Mrutyunjaya Nayak, Indian educationalist, social worker and politician
- Mrityunjay Prabhakar, Indian playwright, theatre director, theatre critic, poet
- Mrityunjay Prasad, Indian politician
- Mrityunjay Kumar Singh, Indian police officer and poet

== See also ==
- Mrutyunjaya Nagaram, a village in Andhra Pradesh, India
