= Kasipatnam =

Coordinates: 18.6535°N 83.2953°E

Kasipatnam is a major panchayathi village of Makkuva mandal, Parvathipuram Manyam district of Andhra Pradesh, India.
