= Thotapalli, Parvathipuram Manyam district =

Thotapalli
- village
- Interactive map of Thotapalli
- Coordinates: 18°47′08″N 83°30′36″E
- Country: India
- State: Andhra Pradesh
- District: Parvathipuram Manyam district

Languages
  - Official: Telugu
- Time zone: UTC+5:30 (IST)
- PIN: 535525
- Nearest city: Parvathipuram
- Lok Sabha constituency: Kurupam
- Vidhan Sabha constituency: Garugubilli

Thotapalli is a village in Garugubilli mandal, Parvathipuram Manyam district, Andhra Pradesh, India.
