= Narayanapuram, Parvathipuram Manyam district =

Narayanapuram
- village
- Interactive map of Narayanapuram
- Location in Andhra Pradesh, India Narayanapuram (India)
- Coordinates: 18°38′10″N 83°32′41″E
- Country: India
- State: Andhra Pradesh
- District: Parvathipuram Manyam

Languages
  - Official: Telugu
- Time zone: UTC+5:30 (IST)
- Postal code: 515004
- Vehicle registration: AP-35
- Nearest city: Bobbili

Narayanapuram is a village and panchayat in Balijipeta mandal of Parvathipuram Manyam district, Andhra Pradesh, India.

== History ==
Sri Nilakanteswara Temple was constructed by a Kalinga king of the Eastern Ganga dynasty in the tenth century. There are four temples in the complex on the west bank of River Suvarnamukhi.
