= Gumada =

- village
- Interactive map of Gumada
- Location in Andhra Pradesh, India Gumada (India)
- Coordinates: 18°54′N 83°28′E
- Country: India
- State: Andhra Pradesh
- District: Parvathipuram Manyam

Population (2001)
  - Total: 1,296

Languages
  - Official: Telugu
- Time zone: UTC+5:30 (IST)
- Vehicle registration: AP-35
- Nearest city: Parvathipuram

Gumada is a village and Gram panchayat located in Komarada mandal in Parvthipuram Manyam district in Andhra Pradesh, India.

Gumada railway station is very close to mandal headquarters Komarada. Gumada station is located on Parvthipuram Manyam–Raipur railway

== Demographics ==
As of 2001 census, Gumada village has demographics as below:

- Total population – 1,296 in 330 households
- Male population – 636
- Female population – 660
- Children under 6 years of age – 202 (Boys – 102 and Girls – 100)
- Total literates – 428
