= Baleru =

- Village
- Country: India
- State: Andhra Pradesh
- District: Parvathipuram Manyam

Languages
  - Official: Telugu
- Time zone: UTC+5:30 (IST)
- PIN: 532 455
- Vehicle registration: AP

Baleru is a village in Bhamini mandal, located in Parvathipuram Manyam district of the Indian state of Andhra Pradesh. It is located between The River Vamsadhara and Tivva hills.
