= Ravipalli =

- village
- Interactive map of Ravipalli
- Location in Andhra Pradesh, India
- Country: India
- State: Andhra Pradesh
- District: Parvathipuram Manyam

Languages
  - Official: Telugu
- Time zone: UTC+5:30 (IST)
- PIN: 535 463

Ravipalli is a village in Garugubilli mandal in the revenue division of Parvathipuram in Parvathipuram Manyam district of India.

== Demographics ==
Ravipalli had a population of 5,200 in 2007. Males constitute 3,388 and females constitute 1,820 of the population. The average literacy rate is 64%. Male literacy rate is 68% and that of females 39%.
