= Barli, Parvathipuram Manyam district =

Barli
- Gram panchayat
- Agriculture fields in Barli
- Interactive map of Barli
- Location in Andhra Pradesh, India
- Coordinates: 18°37′3.79″N 83°28′23.05″E
- Country: India
- State: Andhra Pradesh
- District: Parvathipuram Manyam

Population (2001)
  - Total: 2,512

Languages
  - Official: Telugu
- Time zone: UTC+5:30 (IST)
- Telephone code: 91-8944
- Vehicle registration: AP-35
- Nearest city: Bobbili
- Climate: hot (Köppen)

Barli is a Gram panchayat in Balijipeta mandal of Parvathipuram Manyam district, Andhra Pradesh, India. Barli is located between Bobbili town and Balijipeta, the mandal headquarters.

== Demographics ==
As of 2001 Indian census, the demographic details of Barli village are as follows

- Total population: 2,512 in 599 households.
- Male population: 1,223
- Female population: 1,290
- Children under 6 years of age: 273 (boys - 134 and girls - 139)
- Total literates: 1,180
