= Mondemkhallu =

- village
- Interactive map of Mondemkhallu
- Location in Andhra Pradesh, India Mondemkhallu (India)
- Coordinates: 18.9167°N 83.7000°E
- Country: India
- State: Andhra Pradesh
- District: Parvathipuram Manyam
- Elevation: 191 m (627 ft)

Population (2001)
  - Total: 2,316

Languages
  - Official: Telugu
- Time zone: UTC+5:30 (IST)
- PIN: 535534
- Vehicle registration: AP-39

Mondemkhallu is a village panchayat in Kurupam mandal of Parvathipuram manyam district in Andhra Pradesh, India.

There is a post office at Mondemkhallu. The PIN code is 535534.

== Geography ==
Mondemkhallu is located at 18.9167°N 83.7000°E. It has an average elevation of 191 meters (629 feet).

== Demographics ==
As of 2001, the demographic details of the village is as follows:

- Total Population: 2,316 in 495 Households.
- Male Population: 1,263
- Female Population: 1,053
- Children Under 6-years of age: 280 (Boys - 147 and Girls and 133)
- Total Literates: 1,366
