= Palagara =

Coordinates: 18°37′N 83°32′E

- village
- Interactive map of Palagara
- Country: India
- State: Andhra Pradesh
- District: Parvathipuram Manyam

Population (2001)
  - Total: 5,730

Languages
  - Official: Telugu
- Time zone: UTC+5:30 (IST)
- PIN: 535557
- Telephone code: 08944
- Nearest city: Bobbili
- Sex ratio: 1.1.05 ♂/♀
- Literacy: 70%%
- Lok Sabha constituency: Parvathipuram
- Vidhan Sabha constituency: Parvathipuram
- Climate: hot (Köppen)

Palagara is a village in Balijipeta mandal of Parvathipuram Manyam district, Andhra Pradesh, India. It is the third most populous village in the Balijipeta mandal after Balijipeta and Pedapenki.

== Demographics ==
As of 2001 Indian census, the demographic details of this village are as follows:

- Total population: 5,730 in 1,319 Households.
- Male population: 2,857
- Female population: 2,873
- Children under 6 years of age: 592 (boys – 308 and girls – 284)
- Total literates: 2,766
