= Chemudu =

- village
- Interactive map of Chemudu
- Location in Andhra Pradesh, India Chemudu (India)
- Coordinates: 18°38′28″N 83°13′44″E
- Country: India
- State: Andhra Pradesh
- District: Parvathipuram Manyam
- Elevation: 151 m (495 ft)

Languages
  - Official: Telugu
- Time zone: UTC+5:30 (IST)
- Postal code: 535547
- Vehicle registration: AP

Chemudu is a village in Makkuva mandal in Parvathipuram Manyam district of Andhra Pradesh, India.

== Geography ==
Chemudu is located at 18.6333N 83.2167E. It has an average elevation of 151 meters (498 feet).

== Demographics ==
According to Indian census, 2001, the demographic details of this village is as follows:

- Total Population: 1,833 in 411 Households.
- Male Population: 891
- Female Population: 942
- Children Under 6-years of age: 256 (Boys - 122 and Girls - 134)
- Total Literates: 780
