= Vengapuram =

Coordinates: 10°41′N 79°28′E

- village peace-full
- Interactive map of Vengapuram
- Country: India
- State: Andhra Pradesh
- District: Parvathipuram Manyam

Population (2001)
  - Total: 2,423

Languages
  - Official: Telugu
- Time zone: UTC+5:30 (IST)
- PIN: 535557
- Vehicle registration: AP35
- Nearest city: Bobbili

Vengapuram or is a village located in Balijipeta mandal in Parvathipuram Manyam district in Andhra Pradesh State in India.

== Geography ==
Vengapuram is near the town of Bobbili, a historical town famous for the Battle of Bobbili.

== Demographics ==
According to Indian census, 2001, the demographic details of this village is as follows:

- Total Population: 2,423 in 552 Households.
- Male Population: 1,196
- Female Population: 1,227
- Children Under 6-years of age: 310 (Boys - 159 and Girls - 151)
- Total Literates: 1,086
