= Palakonda =

- Town
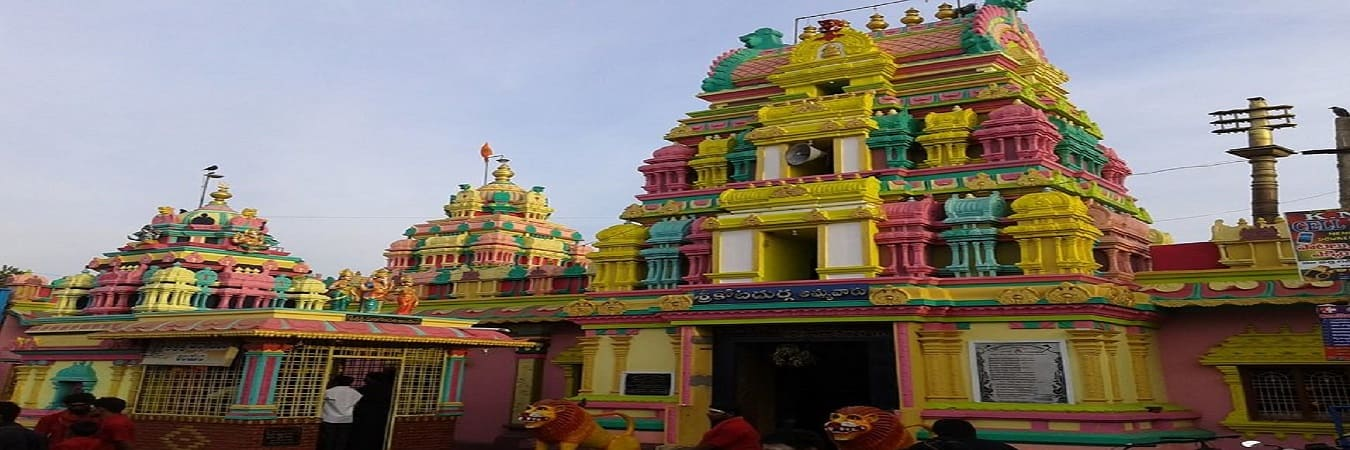
- Sri kota durga temple

- Location in Andhra Pradesh, India
- Coordinates: 18.6000°N 83.7500°E
- Country: India
- State: Andhra Pradesh
- District: Parvathipuram Manyam district

Government
  - MLA: Nimmaka Jayakrishna

Area
  - Total: 6.50 km^{2} (2.51 sq mi)

Population (2011)
  - Total: 31,425
  - Density: 4,830/km^{2} (12,500/sq mi)

Languages
  - Official: Telugu
- Time zone: UTC+5:30 (IST)
- PIN: 532440
- Telephone code: 08941
- Vehicle Registration: AP30 (former); AP39 (from 30 January 2019)
- Lok Sabha constituency: Araku
- Vidhan Sabha constituency: Palakonda
- Website: palakonda.cdma.ap.gov.in

Palakonda is a town in Parvathipuram Manyam district of the Indian state of Andhra Pradesh. It is a nagar panchayat and the mandal headquarters of Palakonda mandal in Palakonda revenue division

== Geography ==
Palakonda is located at 18.6000°N 83.7500°E. It has an average elevation of 44 meters (147 feet).

== Demography ==
According to the Imperial Gazetteer of India, Palkonda Taluk was in Vizagapatnam district with a total area of 502 square miles (1,300 km^{2}). The cultivated land is irrigated by the Nagavali River. The Agency area contains about 56 square miles (150 km^{2}) of Reserved Forest. The population in 1901 was 215,376 compared with 201,331 in 1891. There were two towns Palkonda and Razam and 334 villages. The Agency area had population of about 11,000 people, chiefly Savaras living in 106 villages. The greater part of Taluk was held on Ryotwari and belongs to Rajas of Bobbili and Vizianagram.

It was within Ganjam District of Orissa state till 1950 when Srikakulam district was formed.

== Government and politics ==
Palakonda Nagar panchayat is a civic body constituted in the year 2013. It is spread over an area of 6.50 km^{2} (2.51 sq mi). The present municipal commissioner of the town is B. Ramu.

=== Assembly constituency ===
Palakonda is an assembly constituency in Andhra Pradesh reserved for Scheduled Castes. There were 120,726 registered voters in this constituency in 1999 elections. Now from 2009 onwards the Assembly Constituency reservation changed to S.T.

List of elected members:

Palakonda Assembly candidates details:
| Year | Winner | Party | Votes | Runner Up | Party | Votes | Margin (majority) |
|---|---|---|---|---|---|---|---|
| 2014 | Viswasarai Kalavathi | YSRCP | 55337 | Jaya Krishna Nimmaka | TDP | 53717 | 1620 |

  - GENERAL SEAT
- 1951 – Sri Palavalasa Sangam Naidu
  - RESERVED FOR SCHEDULE CASTE
- 1978 – Sri Kambala Rajaratnam
- 1983 – Sri Gonipati Syamala Rao
- 1985 – Sri Tale Bhadrayya
- 1989 – Smt Amrutha Kumari P.J.
- 1994 – Sri Tale Bhadrayya
- 1999 - Smt Amrutha Kumari P.J.
- 2004 – Sri Kambala Jogulu
  - RESERVED FOR SCHEDULE TRIBE
- 2009 – Sri Nimmaka Sugreevulu
- 2014 – Smt Viswasarai Kalavathi
