= Gangada =

Gangada గంగాడ
- village
- Interactive map of Gangada
- Location in Andhra Pradesh, India Gangada (India)
- Coordinates: 18°32′48.46″N 83°34′05.88″E
- Country: India
- State: Andhra Pradesh
- District: Parvathipuram Manyam

Population (2001)
  - Total: 3,595

Languages
  - Official: Telugu
- Time zone: UTC+5:30 (IST)
- PIN: 535557
- Vehicle registration: AP-35
- Climate: hot (Köppen)

Gangada is a village in the Balijipeta mandal of Parvathipuram Manyam district in northeastern Andhra Pradesh, India. It is located about 50 km from Vizianagaram city.

== Demographics ==
According to Indian census of 2001, the demographics of this village:

- Total Population - 3,595
- Males - 1,795
- Females - 1,800
- Children under 6 years of age - 501 (Boys - 263; Girls - 238)
- Total Literates - 1,557
