= Tatipudi Reservoir =

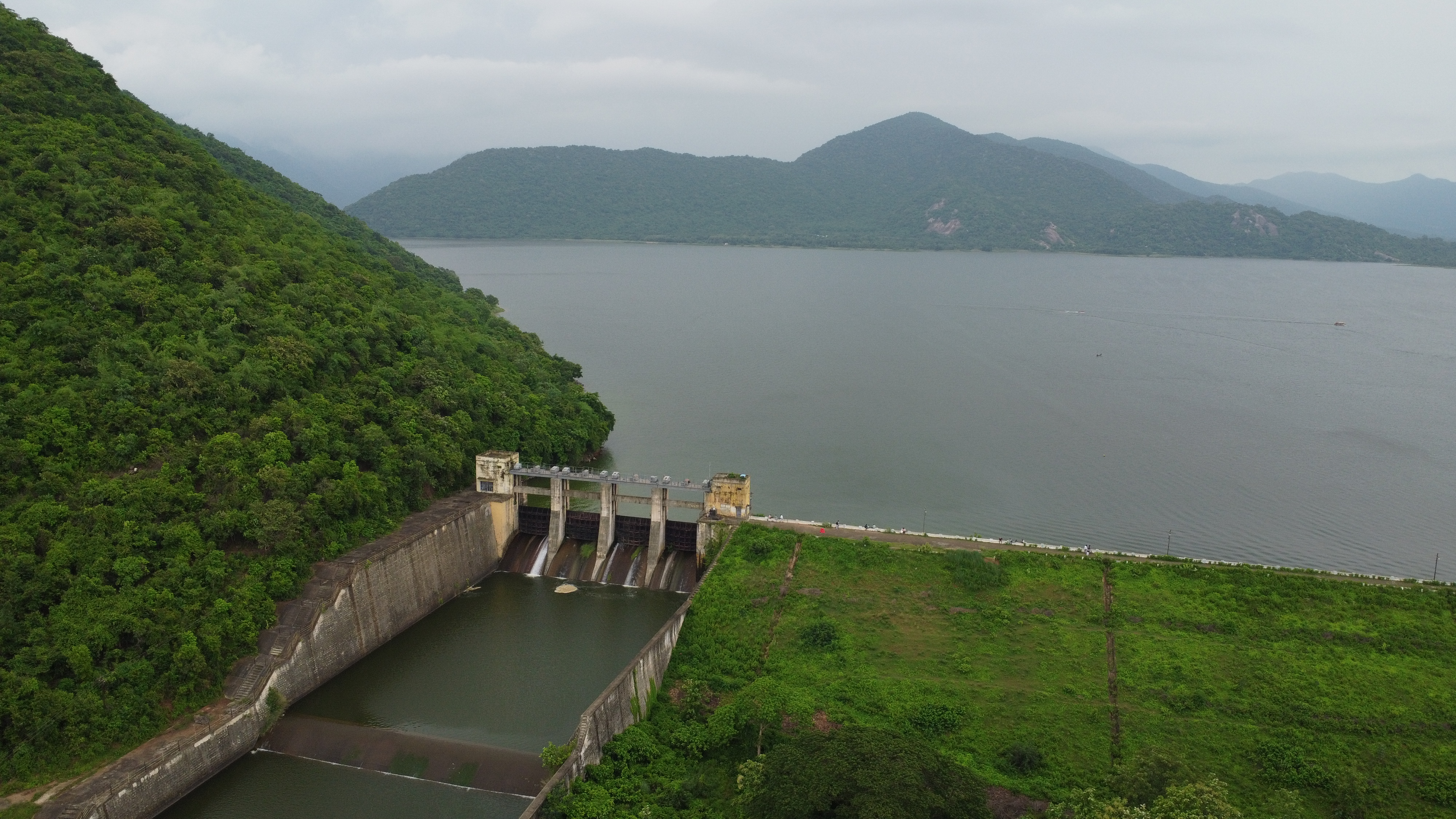
- Tatipudi Dam in Vizianagaram district

- Location within Andhra Pradesh
- Official name: తాటిపూడి రెజర్వాయిర్ Thatipudi Reservoir
- Country: India
- Location: Tatipudi, Vizianagaram district, Andhra Pradesh
- Coordinates: 18.1716°N 83.1939°E
- Construction began: 1963
- Opening date: 1968
- Construction cost: 1.820 crores

Dam and spillways
- Impounds: Gosthani River
- Height: 15.32 metres (50 ft)
- Length: 140.20 metres (460 ft)

Reservoir
- Creates: Tatipudi Reservoir
- Total capacity: 3.32 Tmcft
- Catchment area: 332.72 square kilometres (128.46 sq mi)

"Tatipudi Reservoir" is a dam located on River Gosthani in Andhra Pradesh. It is a water supply reservoir to the city of Visakhapatnam. Thatipudi Reservoir Project was constructed across Gosthani River during 1963–1968. The Project is aimed to irrigate a total ayacut of 15,378 acres (62 km^{2}) in Vizianagaram District and to provide drinking water to Visakhapatnam City. The Project utilizes 3.325 tmcft of the available water and the reservoir storage capacity is about 3 tmcft. The Cost of the project is Rs. 1,820 crores. The Ayacut of 15,378 acres (62 km^{2}) has been stabilised in Gantyada, S.Kota and Jami Mandals of Vizianagaram District.

== Gallery ==
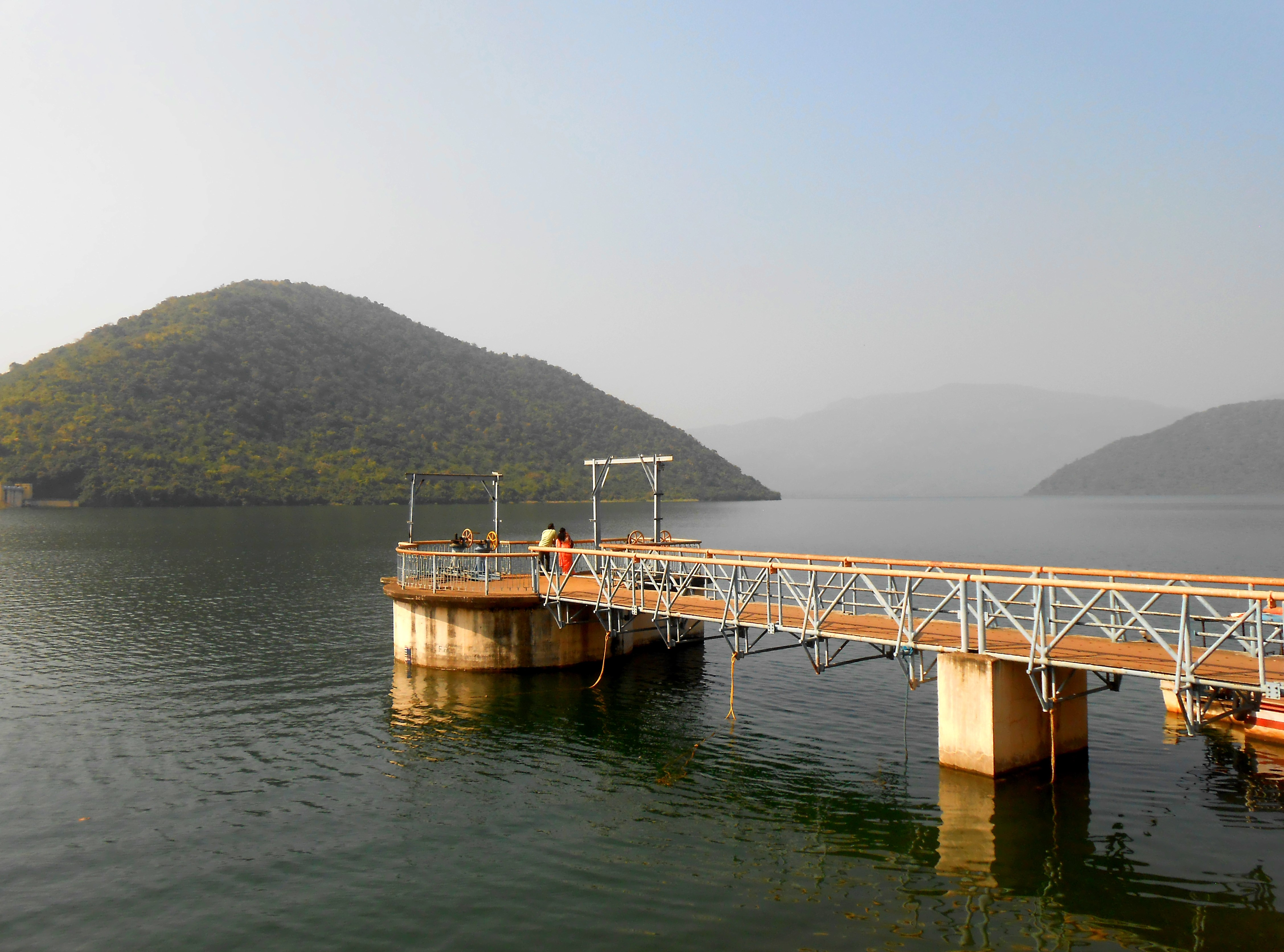
Reservoir and sluice gate bridge

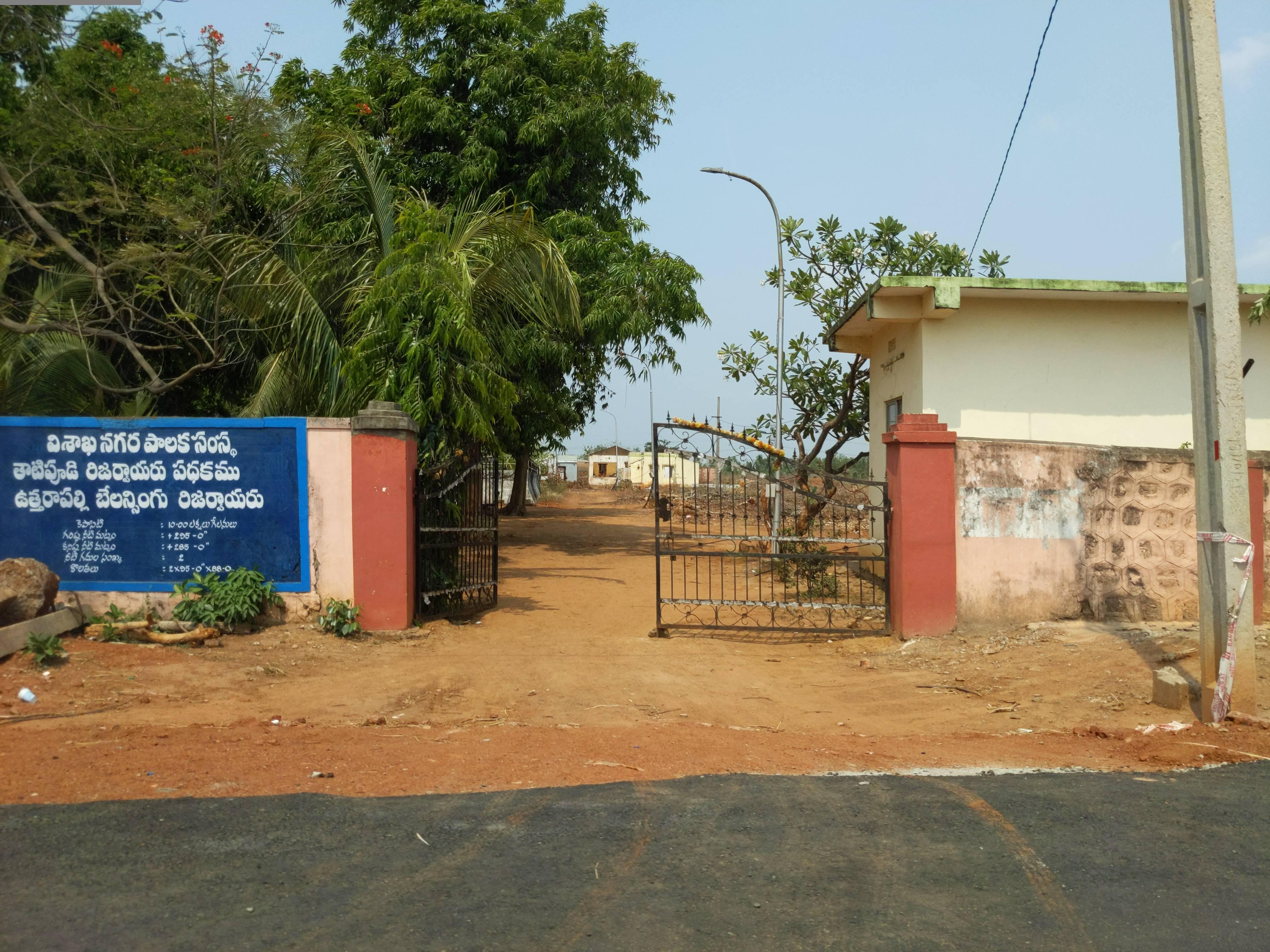
Uttarapalli Balancing Reservoir on the Tatipudi pipeline to Vizag

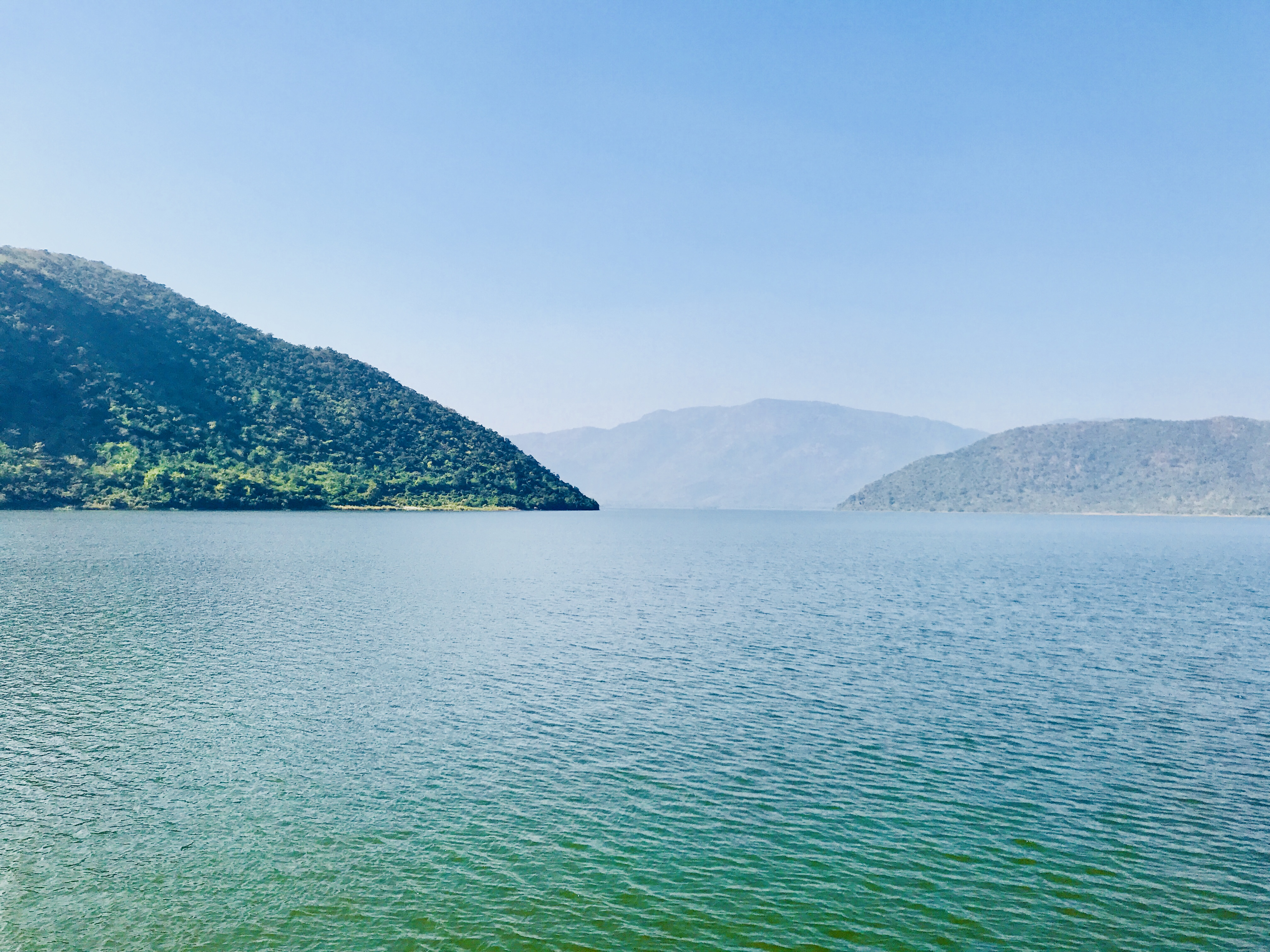
View of reservoir and hills
