= Neelakantapuram =

- Interactive map of Neelakantapuram
- Location in Andhra Pradesh, India
- Country: India
- State: Andhra Pradesh
- District: Parvathipuram Manyam
- Mandal: Kurupam

Population
  - Total: 14,585

Languages
  - Official: Telugu
- Time zone: UTC+5:30 (IST)
- Nearest city: Parvatipuram )
- Lok Sabha constituency: Kurupam
- Vidhan Sabha constituency: Kurupam

Neelakantapuram is a village and panchayat in Kurupam mandal of Parvathipuram Manyam district, Andhra Pradesh, India.

== Notable people ==
The Indian film director Prashanth Neel is a native of Neelakantapuram and takes his surname from the village's name.
