= Garbham =

- village
- Interactive map of Garbham
- Location in Andhra Pradesh, India Garbham (India)
- Coordinates: 18.3667°N 83.4500°E
- Country: India
- State: Andhra Pradesh
- District: Vizianagaram
- Elevation: 108 m (354 ft)

Languages
  - Official: Telugu
- Time zone: UTC+5:30 (IST)
- PIN: 535102
- Vehicle registration: AP

Garbham is a village panchayat in Merakamudidam mandal of Vizianagaram district in Andhra Pradesh, India.

== Geography ==
Garbham is located at 18.3667°N 83.4500°E. It has an average elevation of 108 meters (357 feet).
