= Basangi =

Coordinates: 17.888°N 82.483°E

- village
- Interactive map of Basangi
- Country: India
- State: Andhra Pradesh
- District: Parvathipuram Manyam

Population (2001)
  - Total: 977

Languages
  - Official: Telugu
- Time zone: UTC+5:30 (IST)
- PIN: 535525
- Vehicle registration: AP-35
- Nearest city: Parvathipuram, Andhra Pradesh

Basangi is a small village located at Jiyyammavalasa Mandal in Parvathipuram Manyam District, a northern coastal districts of Andhra Pradesh, India.

== Demographics ==
According to Indian census, 2001, the demographic details of Basangi village is as follows:

- Total Population: 977 in 243 Households
- Male Population: 469 and Female Population: 508
- Children Under 6-years of age: 123 (Boys – 61 and Girls – 62)
- Total Literates: 399
