= Madugula =

- Village
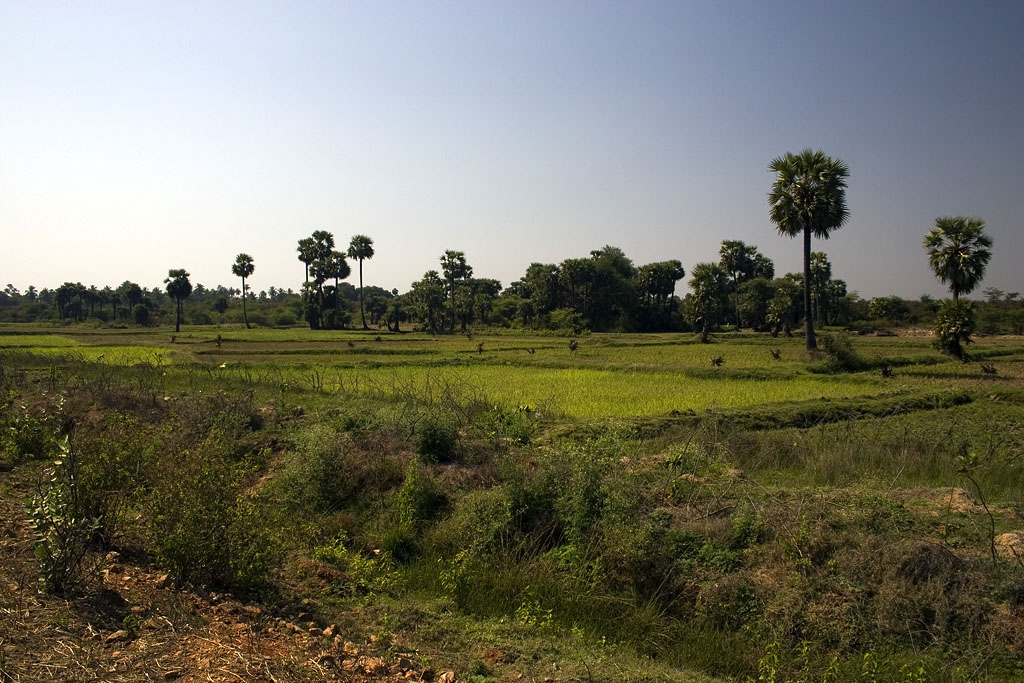
- A view of fields near Madugula
- Interactive map of Madugula
- Location in Andhra Pradesh, India
- Coordinates: 17.9167°N 82.8000°E
- Country: India
- State: Andhra Pradesh
- District: Anakapalli
- Elevation: 83 m (272 ft)

Languages
  - Official: Telugu
- Time zone: UTC+5:30 (IST)
- PIN: 531 027
- Telephone code: 08934
- Vehicle Registration: AP31 (Former); AP39 (from 30 January 2019)

Madugula is a village in Anakapalli district in the state of Andhra Pradesh in India. It was also known as Vaddadi or Vaddadimadugula and was founded by the rulers of the Matsya dynasty. Later, it merged into the kingdom of Nandapur–Jeypore and during the British Raj it remained an independent Zamindari for sometime. Later, in 1915 the zamindaris of Madugula and Pachipenta were purchased by Maharaja Vikram Dev III and they became a part of Jeypore Samasthanam and were governed by the Maharaja of Jeypore until 1947.

== History ==
The rulers of the Matsya dynasty were the southernmost vassals of the Eastern Ganga dynasty that ruled over Kalinga from 5th century - 15th century and the capital of the Matsya kings was known as 'Vaddadi' derived from the word 'Odda-Adi' which meant the beginning of Odra desh (country of Odia people). Later, it was changed to 'Vaddadimadugula' and in modern age it got divided into two villages within the radius of 11 km known as Waddadi and Madugula.

The most valorous king of the dynasty was Narasimhavardhana Arjun Deva who inherited the kingdom from his father Jayanta Deva Raju in the late 13th century. The Dribbida copperplate grant donated by Narasimhavardhana illustrates the origin of the Matsya dynasty of Vaddadi. The first name mentioned in the Dribbida copperplate is of his grandfather, Manikaditya Raju followed by the name of his father, Jayanta Deva Raju.

Narasimhavardhana Arjun Deva was succeeded by his son Sri Krishnavardhana Jayanta Raju who is known for donating the two villages of Gudisingaram and Gotlam to the temple of Simhachalam. He ruled for a long period and was succeeded by his son Veer Arjuna Deva in the mid-14th century, who was a feudatory of the Ganga king, Narasimha Deva III. Initially, Veer Arjun formed an alliance with the Reddy chiefs of Rajahmundry in order to free his kingdom from the suzerainty of the Gangas who were defeated by Firuz Shah Tughlaq in 1361. However, this attempt went to vain as he died in 1381 and was succeeded by his son, Pratap Arjuna.

The Anaparti and Gopavaram copperplate grants suggest that Kumaragiri Reddy regained his suzerainty over Rajahmundry in 1389 and invaded Cuttack with his able general Katayavema who defeated the Ganga ruler, Narasimha Deva IV and assumed the title of Kataka-Churakara meaning - the destroyer of Cuttack. This indicates that Vaddadi slipped away from the Eastern Ganga kingdom for sometime but later in 1424 the last Ganga king, Bhanudeva IV sent his able general and minister, Kapilendra Deva who defeated and drove out the Reddys to as far as Rajahmundry. Evidently, Pratap Arjuna sent his army to help the Gangas.

Pratap Arjuna had a son named Jayanta Deva Raju II whose daughter Singamma was married to the Silavanshi king, Vishwanath Raj of the neighboring Nandapur kingdom. There are two inscriptions dated 4 and 8 July 1427 that records the marriage of Singamma to Vishwanath Raj of Nandapur. This was believed to be a crucial matrimonial alliance between the families of Matsya and Silavansh. The son of Jayanta Deva Raju II was Singharaju who was a contemporary of Pratap Ganga Raj of Nandapur.

In 1443, Pratap Ganga Raj was succeeded by his son-in-law Vinayak Dev who was a junior prince of a small kingdom ruled by Suryavanshi kings in North Kashmir. In a turn of events, Vinayak Dev migrated to Varanasi and then to Nandapur, where he married Lilavati, the only daughter of Pratap Ganga Raj. Evidently, he inherited the kingdom from his father-in-law and faced rebellion from other Silavanshi claimants. As a result, he was ousted and later helped by the Matsya king, Singharaju who helped him curb the rebellion and reclaim the kingdom of Nandapur.

Singharaju was succeeded by his son Vallabhadeva Raju who performed the famous Agnistoma sacrifice on the bank of Danta near Duttada and constructed the temple of Lord Vallabharaya. He donated a village called Annavaram for the service of Lord Vallabharaya and was succeeded by his son Pratap Sri Ganga Raju. This king ruled as vassal of Prataparudra Deva and later his son Veer Pratap Singharaju served under the same Gajapati.

In later years, after the collapse of the Gajapati Empire in the mid 16th century, the king of Nandapur - Vishwanath Dev Gajapati conquered the former territories of the Gajapatis from Bengal in North to Telangana in south. This was a period when the Matsya kingdom of Vaddadi or Madugula became vassals of Nandapur and later the kingdom of Jeypore.

== Matsya Dynasty of Vadaddi ==
Name		Reign began	Reign ended
1	Manikyaditya Raju	1198	1224
2	Jayanta Raju	1224	1257
3	Narasimhavardhana Arjuna Deva	1257	1298
4	Sri Krishnavardhana Jayanta Raju	1298	1352
5	Vir Arjuna Deva	1352	1381
6	Pratap Arjuna Deva	1381	1429
7	Jayanta Raju II	1429	1448
8	Singharaju	1448	1471
9	Vallabhadeva Raju	1471	1498
10	Pratap Sriranga Raju	1498	1516
11	Vira Pratap Singharaju	1516	1541

== Geography ==
Madugula is located at 17.9167°N 82.8°E. It has an average elevation of 83 meters (275 feet). The place is surrounded by hills, river streams and paddy fields. It is largely inhabited by Telugu speaking populace and has an old palace of the Matsya dynasty. The Endrikaparvatam meaning the 'Crab Hill' is the seventh highest peak of Andhra Pradesh with an elevation of 1568 metres above sea-level.

A historic river called 'Matsyakunda' originates from the hills of Madugula and then turn westwards into Odisha to the erstwhile kingdom of Jeypore. It has a historical significance as it used to flow from the Matsya kingdom to the neighbouring kingdom of the Silavanshis and later Suryavanshis. In the later medieval period, the name of the river changed from Matsyakunda to Machkunda. The river flows as a boundary between Andhra Pradesh and Odisha for almost fifty miles and then completely into Malkangiri. The famous Duduma Waterfalls named after a legendary Rani Duduma is formed in the Machkund river and three kilometres away from these waterfalls is a popular tourist spot called Matsya Tirth. The waterfalls of river Machkund are used for generating electricity under the banner of "Machkund Hydroelectric Project".

== Legislative Assembly ==
Madugula is an assembly constituency in Andhra Pradesh. There are 1,70,350 registered voters in Madugula constituency in 2014 elections.

List of Elected Members:

- 1952 - Bajinki Gangayya Naidu (Krishikar Lok Party - Madras presidency)
- 1955 - Donda Sreerama Murty (Vaddadhi)
- 1968 - Maharani Rama Kumari Devi (Jeypore-Madugula royal family)
- 1972 - boddu kalavathi
- 1978 - Kuracha Ramunaidu (Appalarajupuram)
- 1983, 1985, 1989, 1994 and 1999 - Reddi Satyanarayana (Gogada)
- 2004 - Karanam Dharmasri (K.J.puram)
- 2009 - Gavireddi Ramu Naidu (Appalarajupuram)
- 2014 - BUDI. MUTYALA NAIDU (Taruva (v))
- 2019 - BUDI. MUTYALA NAIDU (Taruva (v))
