= Kallepalli Rega =

Coordinates: 17°57′08″N 83°07′34″E

Kallepalli Rega kallepalli Agraharam
- village
- Interactive map of Kallepalli Rega
- Location in Andhra Pradesh, India
- Country: India
- State: Andhra Pradesh
- District: Vizianagaram

Languages
  - Official: Telugu
- Time zone: UTC+5:30 (IST)
- Vehicle registration: AP35
- Climate: hot (Köppen)

Kallepalli Rega is a village in Lakkavarapukota mandal in Vizianagaram district.

Kallepalli Rega Village houses a divine temple of Goddess Gayatri, worshipped as Panchamukha Gayatri. This temple is 3 kilometres (1.9 mi) from Musiram village, on the route from Visakhapatnam or Vijayanagaram to Devarapalli via Kottavalasa. It is located in a serene natural habitat of the lush green environment. Gayatri is the embodiment of Gayatri Upasana as per the vedas. The Gayatri statue in the temple is marvellous and represents Panchamukha (five heads). The Goddess is worshipped as per the traditional vedic upasanas. Gayatri is particularly a metered chant of Gayatri Mantra (Om Bhur Bhuva svah, Tat savitur varenyam, Bhargo devasya deemahi, dhi yo yona prachodayat).

== Veda Maatha Gayathri Devi Temple ==
The Gayathri temple is located in the village of Kallepalli Rega in the Vijayanagarm district, in the state of Andhra Pradesh in India. The village Kallepalli Rega is in Lakkavarapu Kota mandal (Taluk) of Vijayanagaram district
