= Kota Gandredu =

- village
- Interactive map of Kota Gandredu
- Location in Andhra Pradesh, India
- Country: India
- State: Andhra Pradesh
- District: Vizianagaram

Population (2001)
  - Total: 2,325

Languages
  - Official: Telugu
- Time zone: UTC+5:30 (IST)
- Postal code: 53522"
- Vehicle registration: AP35

Kota Gandredu is a village panchayat in Gurla mandal of Vizianagaram district in Andhra Pradesh, India.

== Demographics ==
According to Indian census, 2001, the demographics of this village is as follows:

- Total Population – 2,325
- Male Population – 1.145
- Female Population – 1,180
- Children under 6 years age – 283 (Boys – 133 and Girls – 150)
- Total Literates – 979
