= Garudabilli =

- village
- Interactive map of Garudabilli
- Location in Andhra Pradesh, India Garudabilli (India)
- Coordinates: 18.2015°N 83.3332°E
- Country: India
- State: Andhra Pradesh
- District: Vizianagaram

Languages
  - Official: Telugu
- Time zone: UTC+5:30 (IST)
- PIN: 535260
- Vehicle registration: AP35

Garudabilli is a village and panchayat in Bondapalli mandal, Vizianagaram district of Andhra Pradesh, India.

== Transport ==
Garudabilli railway station is located on Vizianagaram-Raipur main line in East Coast Railway, Indian Railways.
