= Narsipuram =

- Village
- Interactive map of Narsipuram
- Location in Andhra Pradesh, India
- Country: India
- State: Andhra Pradesh
- District: Parvathipuram Manyam

Population (2011)
  - Total: 6,016

Languages
  - Official: Telugu
- Time zone: UTC+5:30 (IST)
- PIN: 535522

Narsipuram is a village located in Parvathipuram Manyam district, Andhra Pradesh, 3 km from Parvathipuram. Located on the stretch of NH-43, it is accessible by all modes of transportation. The town has a railway station for a majority of the trains running from Visakhapatnam to Rayagada.

== Demographics ==
As of 2011 census, Narsipuram had a population of 6,016, made up of 2,961 males and 3,055 females — a sex ratio of 1032 females per 1000 males. Five hundred and sixty children are in the age group of 0–6 years, of which 270 are boys and 290 are girls —a ratio of 1074 per 1000. The average literacy rate stands at 70.89% with 3,377 literates, significantly higher than the state average of 67.41%.
