= Goluguvalasa =

Village in Vizianagaram district, Andhra Pradesh, India

Goluguvalasa is a village in Therlam mandal, Vizianagaram district, Andhra Pradesh, India.
