= Ganivada =

- village
- Interactive map of Ganivada
- Location in Andhra Pradesh, India Ganivada (India)
- Coordinates: 17°58′33″N 83°11′35″E
- Country: India
- State: Andhra Pradesh
- District: Vizianagaram

Population
  - Total: 2,569

Languages
  - Official: Telugu
- Time zone: UTC+5:30 (IST)
- PIN: 535240

Ganivada is an old village in Lakkavarapu Kota Mandal of Vizianagaram district. Originating c. 1860, the village is known for its vast mango orchards.

== Demographics ==
Its Population Composition is as follows:

- Households: 587;
- Total Population: 2,569;
- Male Population: 1,289;
- Female Population: 1,280;
- Children Under 6 Yrs: 303;
- Boys Under 6 Yrs: 145;
- Girls Under 6 Yrs: 158;
- Total Literates: 1,328;
- Total Illiterates: 1,241.

== See also ==
- List of Hindu festivals
