= Mamidipalli =

- village
- Interactive map of Mamidipalli
- Location in Andhra Pradesh, India Mamidipalli (India)
- Coordinates: 18.6167°N 83.1833°E
- Country: India
- State: Andhra Pradesh
- District: Parvathipuram Manyam
- Elevation: 218 m (715 ft)

Languages
  - Official: Telugu
- Time zone: UTC+5:30 (IST)
- PIN: 535593
- Telephone code: 08964
- Vehicle registration: AP-35
- Nearest city: Visakhapatnam
- Literacy: 68%
- Climate: moderate (Köppen)

Mamidipalli or Mamidipalle is a revenue village in Salur mandal of Parvathipuram Manyam district in Andhra Pradesh, India.

== Geography ==
Mamidipalle is located at 18.6167°N 83.1833°E. It has an average elevation of 218 metres (718 ft).
