= Moida =

Coordinates: 21°54′N 75°11′E

- village
- Interactive map of Moida
- Country: India
- State: Andhra Pradesh

Languages
  - Official: Telugu
- Time zone: UTC+5:30 (IST)

Moida is a village panchayat in Nellimarla mandal of Vizianagaram district in Andhra Pradesh, India.

Penumatsa Sambasiva Raju is the longest serving MLA from Sathivada assembly constituency. He has been continuously elected to the Andhra Pradesh Assembly from 1967 till 2005. There is a post office at Moida. The PIN code is 535 280.
