= Nandigam, Vizianagaram district =

Nandigam
- village
- Interactive map of Nandigam
- Location in Andhra Pradesh, India Nandigam (India)
- Coordinates: 18.514223°N 83.491486°E
- Country: India
- State: Andhra Pradesh
- District: Vizianagaram

Government
  - Type: Gram Panchayat
  - Body: Panchayat Council
- Elevation: 126 m (413 ft)

Population (2011)
  - Total: 2,313

Languages
  - Official: Telugu
- Time zone: UTC+5:30 (IST)
- PIN: 535124
- Vehicle registration: AP-35
- Nearest city: Visakhapatnam
- Lok Sabha constituency: Vizianagaram
- Vidhan Sabha constituency: Bobbili
- Climate: hot (Köppen)

Nandigam is a census village in Therlam mandal, Vizianagaram district of Andhra Pradesh.

== Demography ==
Nandigam Demography
	Number of House Holds	Total Population	Total Male	Total Female	Children
Census 2011	612	2330	1165	1165	255
Census 2001					
Census 1991					

Nandigam Social Demography
	Scheduled Caste	Scheduled Tribes	Others including Backward Classes
Census 2011	262	17	2051
Census 2001			
Census 1991			

Demography: Literacy
	Total Literates	Male Literates	Female Literates	Total Illiterates	Male Illiterates	Female Illiterates
Census 2011	967	590	377	1363	575	788
Census 2001						
Census 1991						

== Economy ==
Nandigam's economy is primarily agrarian. Rice, Sugarcane are major crops. Cultivation of Maize is fast picking up. Pulses like green gram and black gram are cultivated as rice fallow crops. Sesame and groundnut are major oil seed crops grown in the village. Most of the households depend on allied activities like dairying and domestic poultry for additional income.

Jaggery production in sugarcane harvesting season is small scale informal enterprise activity providing local employment during lean agricultural season for labourers.

== Society and Culture ==
Most of the social and cultural characteristics are in many ways related to its predominantly agrarian character. The newer generations, being exposed to the rest of the world academically, professionally and culturally, both by physical travel and social media are causing new changes in society and culture. But the cultural beliefs of the villages are still deeply rooted in its agrarian character. Asiramma is the village deity which the people believe as their protector from evil and good physical and mental health and wealth can be obtained by worshipping her. Animal sacrifice particularly of domestic chicken and goat is still practiced.

== Communication and Connectivity ==
Nandigam is located on SH-109 which connects the historic town of Bobbili with Therlam junction. SH-109 is alternative route to connect these two points bypassing the Ramabhadrapuram junction located on SH-4, which connects Andhra-Odisha border from Kuneru to NH-16 junction at Chilakapalem.

Current road condition of SH-109 is that it is a fully paved asphalt road without much damage but many sharp curves.

The nearest railhead to Nandigam is 18 km away Bobbili Junction (VBL) of ECoR located on Vizianagarm-Raipur main line and 25 km away Cheepurupalle (CPP) also of ECoR located on Chennai-Kolkata main line.

The nearest airport and seaport is located at Visakhapatnam city which is about 120 km away.

=== Telecom and Internet ===
Nandigam belongs to Andhra Pradesh telecom circle. Despite being a small village, Nandigam hosts two cellular towers: one by Indus Towers hosting Bharti Airtel [2G & 4G] and VI [2G, 3G & 4G] and the other by state run BSNL [2G & 3G]. AP fibernet, Andhra Pradesh state government's own Tri-service provider, laid OFCs but not operational at consumer level.
