= Kagam =

- Village
- Interactive map of Kagam
- Location in Andhra Pradesh, India Kagam (India)
- Coordinates: 18°28′30″N 83°34′50″E
- Country: India
- State: Andhra Pradesh
- District: Vizianagaram
- Mandal: Therlam

Languages
  - Official: Telugu
- Time zone: UTC+5:30 (IST)
- PIN: 532127

Kagam is a village in Vizianagaram district of the Indian state of Andhra Pradesh. It is located in Therlam mandal.
