= Kunayavalasa =

- village
- Interactive map of Kunayavalasa
- Location in Andhra Pradesh, India
- Country: India
- State: Andhra Pradesh
- District: Vizianagaram

Languages
  - Official: Telugu
- Time zone: UTC+5:30 (IST)
- Vehicle registration: AP-35

Kunayavalasa is a village and panchayat in Therlam mandal in Vizianagaram district of Andhra Pradesh.

== Demographics ==
The village comprises 560 households with a total population of 2,230 among which the literates are 925.
