= Rellivalasa =

- village
- Interactive map of Rellivalasa
- Location in Andhra Pradesh, India
- Coordinates: 18°05′30.717″N 83°31′25.932″E
- Country: India
- State: Andhra Pradesh
- District: Vizianagaram

Government
  - Body: Mahanthi Shankara Rao from TDP

Population (2001)
  - Total: 7,259

Languages
  - Official: Telugu
- Time zone: UTC+5:30 (IST)
- PIN: 535204
- Vehicle registration: AP39
- Nearest city: Vizianagaram
- Climate: hot (Köppen)

Relli-valasa is a village in Pusapatirega mandal of Vizianagaram district. It is one of the villages in Nellimarla constituency. Surrounded and protected by three goddess. Politically strong and developed village.

== Demographics ==
As of 2011, the demographic details of Rellivalasa village were:

- Total Population: 7,599 in 1,852 households (Males 3,771; females 3,828)
- Children Under 6 years of age: 809 (boys 457, girls 352)
- Literacy Rate: 50.12% (Male 57.72%; Female 42.87%)
- Total Workers: 4,122 (Male 2,238; Female 1,884)

== Political ==
- smt.Madhavi Lokam- Member of Legislative Assembly (Nellimarla constituency)
- Baddukonda Appala Naidu – Member of Legislative Assembly (Nellimarla constituency)
- 1983 - Pathivada Narayana Swamy Naidu, Telugu Desam Party
- 1985 - Pathivada Narayana Swamy Naidu, Telugu Desam Party
- 1989 - Pathivada Narayana Swamy Naidu, Telugu Desam Party
- 1994 - Pathivada Narayana Swamy Naidu, Telugu Desam Party
- 1999 - Pathivada Narayana Swamy Naidu, Telugu Desam Party
- 2004 - Pathivada Narayana Swamy Naidu, Telugu Desam Party
- 2009 - Baddukonda Appala Naidu, National Congress Party
- 2014 - Pathivada Narayana Swamy Naidu, Telugu Desam Party
- 2019 - Baddukonda Appala Naidu, YSR Congress Party
- 2024 - Lokam Madhavi, Jana Sena Party (JSP)

=== Polling Stations/Booths near Rellivalasa ===
1. Sivapuram
2. Kothapalle
3. Kotha Mucchumarri
4. Siddeswaram
