= Bonangi =

- village
- Interactive map of Bonangi
- Location in Andhra Pradesh, India Bonangi (India)
- Coordinates: 18°08′50″N 83°13′08″E
- Country: India
- State: Andhra Pradesh
- District: Vizianagaram
- Elevation: 59 m (194 ft)

Languages
  - Official: Telugu
- Time zone: UTC+5:30 (IST)
- PIN: 535160

Bonangi is a village panchayat in Gantyada mandal of Vizianagaram district, Andhra Pradesh, India.

There is a post office at Bonangi.
