= Uttaravalli =

- village
- Interactive map of Uttaravalli
- Location in Andhra Pradesh, India Uttaravalli (India)
- Coordinates: 18°30′N 83°30′E
- Country: India
- State: Andhra Pradesh
- District: Vizianagaram
- Elevation: 80 m (260 ft)

Languages
  - Official: Telugu
- Time zone: UTC+5:30 (IST)
- PIN: 535 124

Uttaravalli or Uttaravilli is a village in Merakamudidam mandal, Vizianagaram district of Andhra Pradesh, India.

== Geography ==
Uttaravilli is located at 18.4667°N 83.4833°E. It has an average elevation of 80 meters (265 feet).

== Demographics ==
According to Indian census, 2001, the demographic details of this village is as follows:

- Total Population: 5,028 in 1,199 Households.
- Male Population: 2,456
- Female Population: 2,572
- Children Under 6-years of age: 617 (Boys - 317 and Girls and 300)
- Total Literates: 1,878
