= Konada =

- village
- Interactive map of Konada
- Location in Andhra Pradesh, India Konada (India)
- Coordinates: 18.0167°N 83.5667°E
- Country: India
- State: Andhra Pradesh
- District: Vizianagaram
- Elevation: 11 m (36 ft)

Languages
  - Official: Telugu
- Time zone: UTC+5:30 (IST)
- PIN: 535213
- Telephone code: 08922
- Vehicle registration: AP-35

Konada is a village and panchayat in Pusapatirega mandal of Vizianagaram district, Andhra Pradesh, India. The population of Konada is around 2000. River Champavathi joins the Bay of Bengal near this village. Konada is near a site intended for eight nuclear power plants, at least six GE-Hitachi Economic Simplified Boiling Water Reactors (ESBWRs).

== Geography ==
Konada is located at 18.0167°N 83.5667°E. It has an average elevation of 11 meters (39 feet).

== Shiva Temples ==
In Konada village, there is a Venugopala Swamy temple which is more than 700 years old. Adjoining to this is Uma Ramalingeshwar Swamy, Kamalingeshwar Swamy temples. This is the first of its kind, wherein three Shivalingas are present under one roof. The temple was constructed by Magatpalli Kammaiya in the year 1346.
