= Karivalasa =

- village
- Interactive map of Karivalasa
- Country: India
- State: Andhra Pradesh
- District: Vizianagaram
- mandal: Garugubilli

Languages
  - Official: Telugu
- Time zone: UTC+5:30 (IST)
- PIN: 535 525

Karivalasa is a village in Garugubilli mandal in the revenue division of Parvathipuram in Vizianagaram district of India.

== Census ==
Karivalasa had a population of 500 in 2011. The average literacy rate is 64.5%. Approximately 350 acres in this village. The Main crop is rice. Other crops are gingili, lentils, greengrams, jute, etc.
