= Peda Bondapalli =

Pedabondapalli
- village
- Interactive map of Pedabondapalli
- Location in Andhra Pradesh, India Pedabondapalli (India)
- Coordinates: 18°45′10″N 83°22′33″E
- Country: India
- State: Andhra Pradesh
- District: Parvathipuram Manyam

Population
  - Total: 4,850

Languages
  - Official: Telugu
- Time zone: UTC+5:30 (IST)
- PIN: 535527
- Sex ratio: 1:1.075 ♂/♀
- Literacy: 43.8%
- Lok Sabha constituency: Araku
- Vidhan Sabha constituency: Parvathipuram

Pedabondapalli (or Pedabondapalle) is a village/Gram panchayat in Parvathipuram mandal, Parvathipuram Manyam district, Andhra Pradesh, India.

It's the second largest village in Parvathipuram town by population.

== Geography ==
Pedabondapalli is situated in Vizianagaram District, Andhra Pradesh with 18.752129 Latitude and 83.375586 Longitude. It has an average elevation of 120 metres (396 feet). It is located at a distance of 7 km from Parvathipuram.

== Demographics ==
As of 2001 India census, Pedabondapalli had a population of 4850.
