= Lakkidam =

- village
- Interactive map of Lakkidam
- Location in Andhra Pradesh, India Lakkidam (India)
- Coordinates: 18.1245424°N 83.2913017°E
- Country: India
- State: Andhra Pradesh
- District: Vizianagaram

Population
  - Total: 3,000(Approximately)

Languages
  - Official: Telugu
- Time zone: UTC+5:30 (IST)
- Vehicle registration: AP-35 And AP-39 (NEW)

Lakkidam is a village and panchayat in Gantyada mandal of Vizianagaram district, Andhra Pradesh, India.

Lakkidam is divided into 12 Wards and 1 MPTC according to Election commission.

Lakkidam brakes out old records in Panchayat elections Of 2021.The Independent Candidate (pavan kumar vasireddy) won in Panchayat elections 2021 With majority of 415 Votes Of President Candidate And The Independent Candidate Win 6 Ward Members, YSRCP Win 5 Ward Members, TDP Win 1 Ward Members. The Independent Candidate mobilised and motivated the youth for that election.He is the candidate to guide and improved village development and started a step towards the development in the village.
