= Sambara, Parvathipuram Manyam district =

Coordinates: 18°39′N 83°13′E

Sambara
- village
- Interactive map of Sambara
- Country: India
- State: Andhra Pradesh
- District: Parvathipuram Manyam

Population (2011)
  - Total: 3,904

Languages
  - Official: Telugu
- Time zone: UTC+5:30 (IST)
- Vehicle registration: AP-35
- Nearest city: Salur
- Vidhan Sabha constituency: Salur

Sambara is a village and panchayat in Makkuva mandal of Parvathipuram Manyam district in Andhra Pradesh, India.

Sambara Polamma Jatara is an annual festival attended by large number of people from the surrounding areas. It is second biggest Jatara in Vizianagaram district after Shri Pydithalli Ammavari Jatara in Vizianagaram city.

== Demographics ==
As of 2011 census of India, the demographic details of this village is as follows:

- Total Population: 3,904 in 895 Households.
- Male Population: 1,987
- Female Population: 1,917
- Children Under 6-years of age: 524 (Boys - 271 and Girls - 253)
- Total Literates: 1,734
