= Merangi =

Merangi Chinamerangi
- village
- Interactive map of Merangi
- Location in Andhra Pradesh, India
- Country: India
- State: Andhra Pradesh
- District: Parvathipuram Manyam

Languages
  - Official: Telugu
- Time zone: UTC+5:30 (IST)
- PIN: 535526
- Telephone code: 08963
- Vehicle registration: AP
- Nearest city: Parvathipuram
- Sex ratio: 1:1 ♂/♀
- Lok Sabha constituency: Parvathipuram
- Vidhan Sabha constituency: Kurupam

Merangi is a village Jiyyammavalasa mandal in Parvathipuram Manyam district of Andhra Pradesh, India. There is a post office at Merangi. The PIN code is 535 526.

== Demographics ==
As of 2001 Indian census, the demographic details of Chinamerangi village is as follows:

- Total Population: 4,452 in 1,030 Households
- Male Population: 2,282 and Female Population: 2,170
- Children Under 6-years of age: 587 (Boys - 307 and Girls - 280)
- Total Literates: 2,136
