= Gurla Thammirajupeta =

- village
- Interactive map of Gurla Thammirajupeta
- Location in Andhra Pradesh, India
- Country: India
- State: Andhra Pradesh
- District: Vizianagaram

Languages
  - Official: Telugu
- Time zone: UTC+5:30 (IST)
- Postal code: 535273
- Vehicle registration: AP-35

Gurla Thammirajupeta is a village panchayat in Mentada mandal of Vizianagaram district, Andhra Pradesh, India.
