= Pedatadivada =

Coordinates: 18°05′N 83°26′E

Pedatadivada is a village located in Denkada mandal of Vizianagaram District, Uttarandhra, Andhra Pradesh, India. It is located 3 km from Vizianagaram.
