= Duppalapudi =

Village in Vizianagaram District, Andhra Pradesh, India

Coordinates: 18°27′N 83°18′E

Duppalapudi is a village in Vizianagaram District, Andhra Pradesh, India. Its pin code is 535579.
