= Mrutyunjaya Nagaram =

- village
- Country: India
- State: Andhra Pradesh

Languages
  - Official: Telugu
- Time zone: UTC+5:30 (IST)
- Postal code: 535 522

Mrutyunjaya Nagaram is a panchayat in Parvathipuram mandal of Parvathipuram Manyam district in Andhra Pradesh, India.
