= Budathanapalli Rajeru =

- Village
- Interactive map of Budathanapalli Rajeru
- Location in Andhra Pradesh, India
- Coordinates: 18.218162°N 83.294435°E
- Country: India
- State: Andhra Pradesh
- District: Vizianagaram

Population (2011)
  - Total: 1,738

Languages
  - Official: Telugu
- Time zone: UTC+5:30 (IST)
- PIN: 535 260
- Vehicle registration: AP

Budathanapalli Rajeru is a village in Bondapalle mandal in Vizianagaram district of Andhra Pradesh, India. It is familiarly known as B.Rajeru. Budatanapalli Rajeru is surrounded by Gajapathinagaram Mandal to the North, Gantyada Mandal to the South, Mentada Mandal to the North and Gurla Mandal to the East. It is located 20 km North of the district headquarters Vizianagaram.

== Demographics ==
As per Population Census 2011 Budatanapalle Rajeru village has population of 1738 of which 876 are males and 862 are females. Average Sex Ratio of Budatanapalle Rajeru village is 984 which is lower than Andhra Pradesh state average of 993. Population of children with age 0-6 is 168 which makes up 9.67% of total population of village. Child Sex Ratio for the Budatanapalle Rajeru as per census is 1000, higher than Andhra Pradesh average of 939. Literacy rate of the village was 51.53% compared to 67.02% of Andhra Pradesh.
