= Pedanadipalli =

- Village
- Interactive map of Pedanadipalli
- Coordinates: 18.15°N 83.38°E
- Country: India
- State: Andhra Pradesh
- District: Vizianagaram district

Area
  - Total: 3.58 km^{2} (1.38 sq mi)
- Elevation: 92 m (302 ft)

Population (2014)
  - Total: 1,790
  - Density: 500/km^{2} (1,290/sq mi)

Languages
  - Official: Telugu
- Time zone: UTC+5:30 (IST)
- PIN: 535125

Pedanadipalli is a village in Vizianagaram district of the Indian state of Andhra Pradesh. It is located in Cheepurupalli mandal. It is 13 km from the mandal headquarters and 43km from the district headquarters. It is situated at 14 km from the National Highway 16.

== Education ==
Two mandal parishad schools and one zilla parishad school serve the village.

== Economy ==
People in this village depends on agriculture and the related works especially sheep grazing and cattle milk.

== Politics ==
The village is a part of Cheepurupalli (Assembly constituency), an assembly segment of Vizianagaram (Lok Sabha constituency). Botcha Satyanarayana is the present MLA of the constituency, who won the 2019 Andhra Pradesh Legislative Assembly election from YSR Congress Party.
