= Neelavathi =

- village
- Interactive map of Neelavathi
- Location in Andhra Pradesh, India
- Country: India
- State: Andhra Pradesh
- District: Vizianagaram

Languages
  - Official: Telugu
- Time zone: UTC+5:30 (IST)
- PIN: 535215
- Vehicle registration: AP 35
- Nearest city: Visakhapatnam

Neelavathi is a village and panchayat in Gantyada mandal of Vizianagaram district, Andhra Pradesh, India. The Postal Pincode of Neelavathi village is 535215 (Under Gantyada Postal circle)

== Architecture ==
Buddhist Stupa ruins are located on a hillock named Durgabhairava Konda near the village of Neelavathi. Excavations conducted by the Archaeological survey of India officials on this small hillock (altitude of 100 meters) yielded some Buddhist structures and remnants on the hilltop. This place is contemporary with the nearest Buddhist Site of Ramatheertham in the district.
