= Mettapalli =

Coordinates: 18°51′N 79°17′E

- village
- Interactive map of Mettapalli
- Location in Andhra Pradesh, India
- Country: India
- State: Andhra Pradesh
- District: Vizianagaram

Population (2011)
  - Total: 3,474

Languages
  - Official: Telugu
- Time zone: UTC+5:30 (IST)
- Vehicle registration: AP-35
- Nearest city: Vizianagaram

Mettapalli is a village panchayat in Cheepurupalli mandal of Vizianagaram district in Andhra Pradesh, India. It is located about 29 km from Vizianagaram city.

== Demographics ==
According to Indian census, 2001, the demographic details of this village is as follows:

- Total Population: 3,369 in 701 Households.
- Male Population: 1,707
- Female Population: 1,662
- Children Under 6-years of age: 410 (Boys - 202 and Girls - 208)
- Total Literates: 1,185
