= S Burjavalasa =

S Burjavalasa is a village located in Dattirajeru mandal of Vizianagaram District. It is 15 km (9.3 mi) away from Dattirajeru and 45 km (28 mi) away from Vizianagaram.
