= Naiduvalasa =

Village in Vizianagaram, Andhra Pradesh, India

Naiduvalasa is a village in Vizianagaram district, Andhra Pradesh, India.
