= Karakam =

Coordinates: 18°16′N 83°37′E

Karakam is a small village in Cheepurupalli Mandal, Vizianagaram district in Andhrapradesh state of India. As of the 2011 Census of India, Karakam had a population of 1,148 across 279 households. There were 561 males (48.8%) and 587 females (51.2%). 513 (44.6%) people were literate. 135 (11.7%) were under the age of 6.
