= Seeta Nagaram =

SEETHANAGARAM సీతానగరం
- mandal
- Location in Andhra Pradesh, India
- Coordinates: 18.6667°N 83.3667°E
- Country: India
- State: Andhra Pradesh
- District: Parvathipuram Manyam

Government
  - Type: [telugu desam]
- Elevation: 95 m (312 ft)

Population
  - Total: 56,331

Languages
  - Official: Telugu
- Time zone: UTC+5:30 (IST)
- PIN: 535 546
- Vehicle Registration: AP35 (Former); AP39 (from 30 January 2019)

Seethanagaram is a mandal in Parvathipuram Manyam district of the Indian state of Andhra Pradesh.

== Geography ==
Seethanagaram is a Mandal in Parvathipuram Manyam District of Andhra Pradesh, India. Seethanagaram Mandal Headquarters is Seethanagaram town . It belongs to Andhra region . It is located 15 km towards South from District headquarters Parvathipuram. 468 km from State capital Vijayawada towards west. Sitanagaram is located at 18.6667°N 83.3667°E. It has an average elevation of 95 meters (314 feet).

== Demography ==
Telugu is the Local Language here. Total population of Seethanagaram Mandal is 56,331 living in 13,619 Houses, Spread across total 56 villages and 35 panchayats . Males are 27,931 and Females are 28,400.
