= Tatipudi, Khammam district =

Tatipudi
- village
- Location in Telangana Tatipudi (India)
- Coordinates: 17°09′05″N 80°20′20″E
- Country: India
- State: Telangana
- District: Khammam
- Founder: satish(pandu)
- Named for: abhi

Government
  - Type: IND
  - Body: TS government

Area
  - Total: 80 km^{2} (31 sq mi)
  - Rank: 24

Population (3589)
  - Total: 2,275
  - Rank: 12
  - Density: 28/km^{2} (74/sq mi)

Languages Telugu
  - Official: Telugu
- Time zone: UTC+5:30 (IST)
- PIN: 507165
- Vehicle registration: TS 04
- Lok Sabha constituency: Khammam
- Vidhan Sabha constituency: Wyra
- Website: facebook.com/tatipudichowdaries

Tatipudi is a village in Wyra mandal, Khammam district, in Telangana, India. Tatipadu village is small village and it is handover under TS government in year 2014 and central government, it has no development from ages .There are total population 3589 members and it is famous for tamrind
