= Challapeta =

- village
- Interactive map of Challapeta
- Location in Andhra Pradesh, India
- Country: India
- State: Andhra Pradesh
- District: Vizianagaram

Population (2001)
  - Total: 1,928

Languages
  - Official: Telugu
- Time zone: UTC+5:30 (IST)
- Vehicle registration: AP-35

Challapeta is a village panchayat in Mentada mandal of Vizianagaram district, Andhra Pradesh, India. It is located about 29 km from Vizianagaram city. There is a Zilla Parishad High School in the village. There is a post office at Challapeta. PIN code is 535 581.

== Demographics ==
As of 2001 Indian census, the demographic details of Challapeta village is as follows:

- Total Population: 1,928 in 428 Households
- Male Population: 950 and Female Population: 978
- Children Under 6-years of age: 247 (Boys - 118 and Girls - 129)
- Total Literates: 755
