= Uttarapalli =

- village
- Interactive map of Uttarapalli
- Location in Andhra Pradesh, India Uttarapalli (India)
- Coordinates: 17.959935°N 83.181964°E
- Country: India
- State: Andhra Pradesh

Languages
  - Official: Telugu
- Time zone: UTC+5:30 (IST)

Uttarapalli is a village panchayat in Kothavalasa mandal of Vizianagaram district in Andhra Pradesh, India.

== Assembly Constituency ==
Uttarapalli is an assembly constituency in Andhra Pradesh.

List of Elected Members:

- 1978 - Kakarlapudi Vijaya Raghava Satyanarayana Padmanabha Raju
- 1983, 1985, 1989, 1994 and 1999 - Kolla Appala Naidu
- 2004 - Pudi Mangapathi Rao
