= Jakkuva =

Village in India

Coordinates: 18°22′N 83°16′E

Jakkuva is a village in Mentada mandal of Vizianagaram District of India. It is 10 km (6.2 mi) from Mentada and 40 km (25 mi) from Vizianagaram. It is also a gram panchayat.
