= Jagannadapuram =

- Village
- Interactive map of Jagannadapuram
- Location in Andhra Pradesh, India
- Coordinates: 17.4752722°N 82.5111421°E
- Country: India
- State: Andhra Pradesh
- District: Vizianagaram

Languages
  - Official: Telugu
- Time zone: UTC+5:30 (IST)

Jagannadapuram is near to Parvatipuram town in Vizianagaram district of Andhra Pradesh, India.
