= Gotlam =

- village
- Interactive map of Gotlam
- Location in Andhra Pradesh, India Gotlam (India)
- Coordinates: 18.1716°N 83.3605°E
- Country: India
- State: Andhra Pradesh
- District: Vizianagaram

Languages
  - Official: Telugu
- Time zone: UTC+5:30 (IST)
- PIN: 535003
- Telephone code: 08922
- Vehicle registration: AP-35

Gotlam is a village and panchayat in Bondapalli mandal, Vizianagaram district of Andhra Pradesh, India.

It is located about 8 km from Vizianagaram city. There is a railway station at Gotlam in Vizianagaram-Raipur main line in East Coast Railway, Indian Railways.
