= K. L. Puram =

- village
- Interactive map of K. L. Puram
- Location in Andhra Pradesh, India
- Country: India
- State: Andhra Pradesh
- District: Vizianagaram

Population (2001)
  - Total: 1,764

Languages
  - Official: Telugu
- Time zone: UTC+5:30 (IST)

K. L. Puram or Kokilametta Lakshmipuram is a village in Vizianagaram district of Andhra Pradesh, India.

It is located on the National Highway 43 in the suburban area of Vizianagaram city towards Gajapathinagaram.

== Demographics ==
As of 2001 Indian census, the demographic details of K.L.Puram village is as follows:

- Total Population: 1,764 in 393 Households.
- Male Population: 908 and Female Population: 856
- Children Under 6-years of age: 232 (Boys - 125 and Girls - 107)
- Total Literates: 1,064
