= Gummalaxmipuram =

- Village
- Interactive map of Gummalaxmipuram
- Location in Andhra Pradesh, India Gummalaxmipuram (India)
- Coordinates: 19°01′19″N 83°39′12″E
- Country: India
- State: Andhra Pradesh
- District: Parvathipuram Manyam

Population (2011)
  - Total: 2,783

Languages
  - Official: Telugu
- Time zone: UTC+5:30 (IST)
- PIN: 535 523

Gummalaxmipuram is a village in Parvathipuram Manyam district of the Indian state of Andhra Pradesh.

== Demography ==
As of 2011 Census of India, the village had a population of 2,783. The total population constitute, 1,648 males and 1,135 females —a sex ratio of 689 females per 1000 males. 224 children are in the age group of 0–6 years, of which 124 are boys and 100 are girls —a ratio of 807 per 1000. The average literacy rate stands at 86.84% with 2,217 literates, significantly higher than the state average of 67.41%.
