= Puritipenta =

- Village
- Interactive map of Puritipenta
- Location in Andhra Pradesh, India
- Coordinates: 18.277698°N 83.294540°E
- Country: India
- State: Andhra Pradesh
- District: Vizianagaram
- Mandal: Gajapathinagaram

Government
  - Type: Panchayat raj
  - Body: Gram panchayat

Population (2011)
  - Total: 8,039

Languages
  - Official: Telugu
- Time zone: UTC+5:30 (IST)
- Postal code: 535270
- Vehicle registration: AP-35

Puritipenta is located in Gajapathinagaram mandal of Vizianagaram District in Andhra Pradesh State, India.

== Demographics ==
In this village population of children with age 0-6 is 836 which makes up 10.40% of total population of village. Average Sex Ratio of this village is 1038 which is higher than the state average of 993. Child Sex Ratio for this village as per census is 926, lower than the state average of 939. This village has higher literacy rate compared to the state literacy rate . In 2011, literacy rate of this village was 77.59% compared to 67.02% of the State . In this village Male literacy stands at 85.19% while female literacy rate was 70.37%.

In this village out of total population, 2911 were engaged in work activities. 92.41% of workers describe their work as Main Work (Employment or Earning more than 6 Months) while 7.59% were involved in Marginal activity providing livelihood for less than 6 months. Of 2911 workers engaged in Main Work, 286 were cultivators (owner or co-owner) while 625 were Agricultural labourer.

Census of India, assigned the following codes to identify each village uniquely. Census codes for this village are as follows:

Level	Code
State	28
District	543
Mandal	04825
Village	582741

According to the 2011, the details of this village are as follows:

2011 Census Information
Particulars	Total	Male	Female
Total No. of Houses	2,030	-	-
Population	8,039	3,945	4,094
Child (0-6)	836	434	402
Schedule Caste	668	330	338
Schedule Tribe	206	106	100
Literacy	77.59 %	85.19 %	70.37 %
Total Workers	2,911	2,083	828
Main Worker	2,690	0	0
Marginal Worker	221	68	153

=== Caste Factor ===
Schedule Caste (SC) constitutes 8.31% while Schedule Tribe (ST) were 2.56% of total population in this village.

== Political Information ==
As per constitution of India and Panchayati Raaj Act, this village is administrated by Sarpanch (Head of Village) who is elected representative of village. Mr. Mandala Suresh was the First Sarpanch of this Village. He was elected as Sarpanch in 2014 elections, Present Sarpanch of this Village is Sontyana Vijaya Laxmi.
