= Somalingapuram =

Coordinates: 18°25′N 83°29′E

- Village
- Interactive map of Somalingapuram
- Country: India
- State: Andhra Pradesh
- District: Vizianagaram

Population (2011)
  - Total: 905

Languages
  - Official: Telugu
- Time zone: UTC+5:30 (IST)
- Postal code: 531056

Somalingapuram is a village in Merakamudidam mandal, located in Vizianagaram district of Andhra Pradesh, India.
