= Komarada =

- Village
- Interactive map of Komarada
- Location in Andhra Pradesh, India Komarada (India)
- Coordinates: 18.875052°N 83.4994277°E
- Country: India
- State: Andhra Pradesh
- District: Parvathipuram Manyam

Population (2011)
  - Total: 5,551

Languages
  - Official: Telugu
- Time zone: UTC+5:30 (IST)
- PIN: 535521
- Vehicle Registration: AP35 (Former); AP39 (from 30 January 2019)

Komarada is a village in Parvathipuram Manyam district of the Indian state of Andhra Pradesh.

== Demography ==
As of 2011 Census of India, Komarada had a population of 5,551. The total population constitute, 2,462 males and 3,089 females —a sex ratio of 1255 females per 1000 males. 427 children are in the age group of 0–6 years, of which 204 are boys and 223 are girls —a ratio of 1093 per 1000. The average literacy rate stands at 69.03% with 3,537 literates, significantly higher than the state average of 67.41%.

== Government and politics ==
Komarada gram panchayat is the local self-government of the village. The elected members of the gram panchayat is headed by a sarpanch. The sarpanch of the villages was awarded Nirmala Grama Puraskaram for the year 2013.
