= Vepada =

Coordinates: 18°00′29″N 83°03′21″E

- village
- Interactive map of Vepada
- Country: India
- State: Andhra Pradesh
- District: Vizianagaram

Languages
  - Official: Telugu
- Time zone: UTC+5:30 (IST)
- PIN: 535281
- Vehicle Registration: AP35 (Former); AP39 (from 30 January 2019)

Vepada is a village in Vizianagaram district of the Indian state of Andhra Pradesh, India.

== Demography ==
Vepada mandal has a population of 50,264 in 2001. 24,823 Males and 25,441 Females. The average literacy rate is 48%, below the national average of 59.5%. Male literacy rate is 61% and that of females 35%.
