= Makkuva mandal =

- Mandal
- Interactive map of Makkuva mandal
- Location in Andhra Pradesh, India
- Coordinates: 18.6667°N 83.2667°E
- Country: India
- State: Andhra Pradesh
- District: Parvathipuram Manyam district
- Headquarters: Makkuva

Government
  - Body: Mandal Parishad

Population (2011)
  - Total: 48,344

Languages
  - Official: Telugu
- Time zone: UTC+5:30 (IST)

Makkuva mandal is one of the 34 mandals in Parvathipuram Manyam district of the Indian state of Andhra Pradesh. It is administration under Parvathipuram revenue division and headquartered at Makkuva. The mandal is bounded by Salur mandal on South & West, Parvathipuram mandal on North, Seethanagaram mandal on east and Bobbili mandal on south east. A portion of it also borders the Narayanapatna block of the Koraput district of Odisha on north west.

== Demographics ==
As of 2011 census, the mandal had a population of 48,344. The total population constitute, 24,106 males and 24,238 females. The entire population is rural in nature.

== Government and politics ==
Makkuva mandal is one of the four mandals in Salur (Assembly constituency), which in turn is a part of Araku (Lok Sabha constituency), one of the 25 Lok Sabha constituencies representing Andhra Pradesh. The present MLA is Sandhya Rani Gummidi, who won the Andhra Pradesh Legislative Assembly election, 2024 representing Telugu Desham Party.

== Rural villages ==
As of 2011 2011 census of India, the mandal has 48 settlements, consisting of 48 villages.

The settlements in the mandal are listed below:

1. Alagaruvu
2. Anasabhadra
3. Bangaruvalasa
4. Bantumakkuva
5. Battivalasa
6. Biramasi
7. Chappabutcham Peta
8. Duggeru
9. Dabbagadda
10. Gopalapuram
11. Guntabhadra
12. Kannampeta
13. Kasipatnam
14. Khaviripalle
15. Khavirivalasa
16. Kona
17. Kondabutcham Peta
18. Kondarejeru
19. Koyyanapeta
20. Lovarkhandi
21. Makkuva
22. Markondaputti
23. Mendangi
24. MELAPUVALASA
25. Mukavalasa
26. MELAPUVALASA
27. Mulakkayavalasa
28. Mulavalasa
29. Nagulladabba Gadda
30. Nanda
31. Nandakottula Ghasila
32. Narayana Ramachandraraju Puram
33. Panasabhadra
34. Papayyavalasa
35. Payakapadu
36. Pedaghasila
37. Pedavootagadda
38. Sambara
39. Santeswaram
40. Sanyasirajupuram @ Maripivalasa
41. Saraivalasa
42. Seebillipedavalasa
43. Sirlam
44. Thotavalasa
45. Turumamidi
46. Venkampeta
47. Venkatabhyripuram
48. Vijayarampuram
49. Yerrasamanthula Valasa
