= Sathivada =

- village
- Interactive map of Sathivada
- Location in Andhra Pradesh, India
- Country: India
- State: Andhra Pradesh

Languages
  - Official: Telugu
- Time zone: UTC+5:30 (IST)
- Vehicle registration: AP

Sathivada is a village and panchayat in Nellimarla mandal of Vizianagaram district, Andhra Pradesh, India.

== Assembly constituency ==
Sathivada is an assembly constituency in Andhra Pradesh. There are 1,24,695 registered voters in Sathivada constituency in 1999 elections.

List of Elected Members:

- 1978 - Penumatsa Sambasiva Raju, Indian National Congress
- 1983 - Penumatsa Sambasiva Raju, Indian National Congress
- 1985 - Penumatsa Sambasiva Raju, Indian National Congress
- 1989 - Penumatsa Sambasiva Raju, Indian National Congress
- 1994 - Potnuru Suryanarayana, Telugu Desam Party
- 1999 - Penumatsa Sambasiva Raju, Indian National Congress
- 2004 - Penumatsa Sambasiva Raju, Indian National Congress
