= Kurupam =

- village
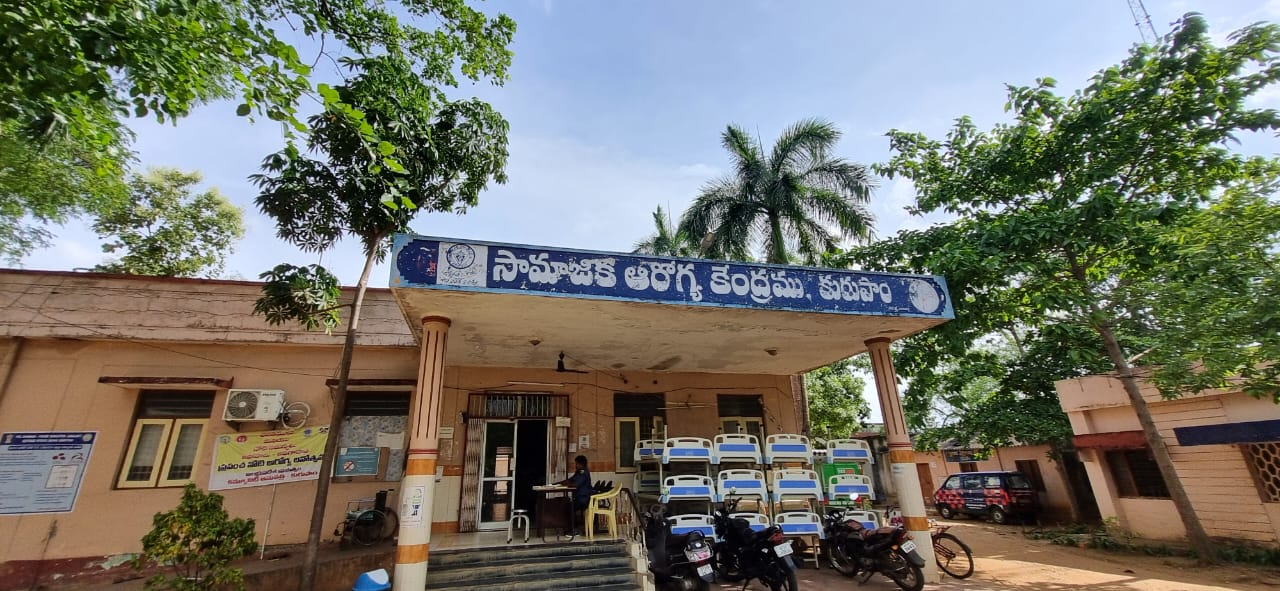
- Government hospital in Kurupam
- Interactive map of Kurupam
- Location in Andhra Pradesh, India
- Coordinates: 18°51′56″N 83°33′13″E
- Country: India
- State: Andhra Pradesh
- District: Parvathipuram Manyam

Government
  - MLA: Pushpasreevani Pamula
- Elevation: 133 m (436 ft)

Languages
  - Official: Telugu
- Time zone: UTC+5:30 (IST)
- PIN: 535 524
- Vehicle Registration: AP35 (Former); AP39 (from 30 January 2019)

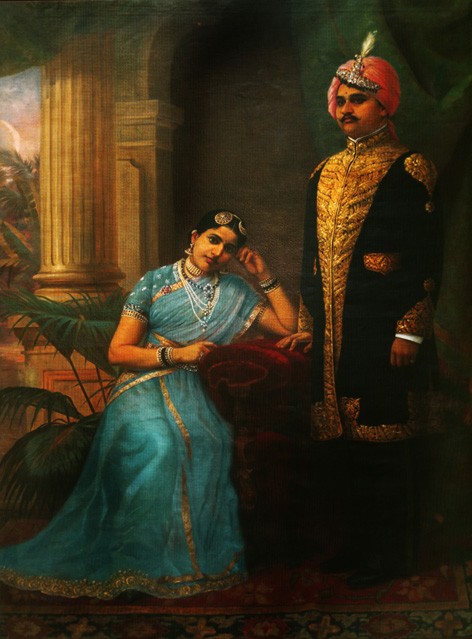
Raja and Rani of Kurupam by Raja Ravi Varma

Kurupam is a village in Parvathipuram Manyam district of the Indian state of Andhra Pradesh.

== Geography ==
It is located at 18.8667°N 83.5667°E. It has an average altitude of 133 meters (439 feet).

== Demography ==
As of 2001 census, Kurupam mandal had a population of 46,439. Males consists of 23,241 and females 23,198 of the population. The average literacy rate is 46%, below the national average of 59.5%. Male literacy rate is 57% and that of females is 35%. Way back the great people such as Ravupalli Krishna Murthy was born here and contributed so much to this Mandal. This legacy is carrying by Ravupalli Umamaheswararao, Ravupalli Srinivasa Hemanth and Divya Ravupalli

== Kurupam Kingdom ==
Vyricherla Kishore Chandra Suryanarayana Deo, Erstwhile Zamindar - Rajah of Kurupam and Tribal Chiefs of the Konda Dora Tribe was member of Lok Sabha and a Union Cabinet Minister. He is now a senior member of the Telugu Desam Party.
