= Tatipudi, Vizianagaram district =

Tatipudi Tatipudi reservoir
- village
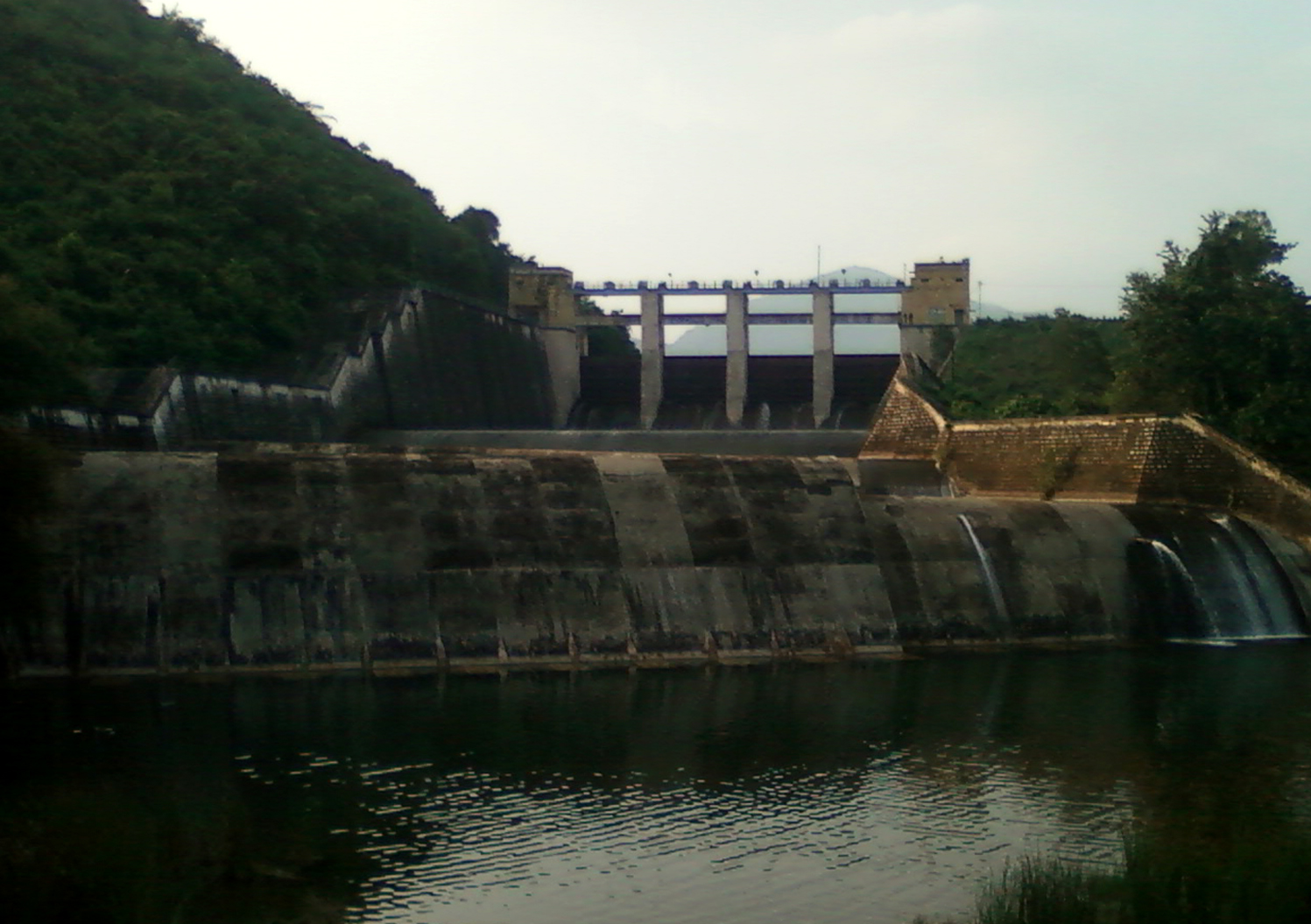
- Tatipudi Dam
- Interactive map of Tatipudi
- Location in Andhra Pradesh, India
- Country: India
- State: Andhra Pradesh
- Started: 1963-68

Government
  - Type: Andhra pradesh

Languages
  - Official: Telugu
- Time zone: UTC+5:30 (IST)
- Postal code: 535160

Tatipudi is a village and panchayat in Gantyada Mandal, Vizianagaram district in Andhra Pradesh, India. It is home to the Tatipudi Reservoir. This project is on Gosthani river, and was built in 1963-68. Through this project drinking water is being provided to Visakhapatnam city. "Thatipudi Upliftment scheme" has been started and will be completed by 2023.
