= Gurla =

- Village
- Interactive map of Gurla
- Location in Andhra Pradesh, India Gurla (India)
- Coordinates: 18°12′42″N 83°27′57″E
- Country: India
- State: Andhra Pradesh
- District: Vizianagaram

Population (2011)
  - Total: 2,962

Languages
  - Official: Telugu
- Time zone: UTC+5:30 (IST)
- Vehicle Registration: AP35 (Former); AP39 (from 30 January 2019)

Gurla is a village in Vizianagaram district of the Indian state of Andhra Pradesh, India.

== Demographics ==
As of 2011 Census of India, Gurla had a population of 2,962. The total population constitute, 1,457 males and 1,505 females —a sex ratio of 1033 females per 1000 males. 303 children are in the age group of 0–6 years, of which 153 are boys and 150 are girls —a ratio of 980 per 1000. The average literacy rate stands at 49.49% with 1,316 literates, significantly higher than the state average of 67.41%.
