= Jiyyammavalasa =

Coordinates: 18°49′07″N 83°34′47″E

- village
- Interactive map of Jiyyammavalasa
- Country: India
- State: Andhra Pradesh
- District: Parvathipuram Manyam

Languages
  - Official: Telugu
  - Other: Telugu
- Time zone: UTC+5:30 (IST)
- PIN: 535526
- Telephone code: 08963 227XXX
- Vehicle Registration: AP35 (Former); AP39 (from 30 January 2019)
- Nearest city: Parvathipuram, Andhra Pradesh
- Lok Sabha constituency: Araku
- Vidhan Sabha constituency: Kurupam

Jiyyammavalasa is a village in Parvathipuram Manyam district of the Indian state of Andhra Pradesh.

It is located about 78 km from Vizianagaram city.

== Demography ==
Jiyyammavalasa mandal had a population of 105,625 in 2008. Males constituted 27,887 and females 27,738 of the population. The average literacy rate was 51%. The male literacy rate was 64% and that of females 37%. The big villages in this mandal are Jiyyammavalasa, Chinamerangi. The main corp is Paddy.

There are 58 revenue villages and 31 panchayats in Jiyyammavalasa mandal.
