= Lakkavarapukota =

- Village
- Interactive map of Lakkavarapukota
- Location in Andhra Pradesh, India Lakkavarapukota (India)
- Coordinates: 18°01′25″N 83°09′24″E
- Country: India
- State: Andhra Pradesh
- District: Vizianagaram
- Elevation: 60 m (200 ft)

Languages
  - Official: Telugu
- Time zone: UTC+5:30 (IST)
- PIN: 535161
- Vehicle Registration: AP35 (Former); AP39 (from 30 January 2019)

Lakka-varapu-kota or L. Kota is a village in Vizianagaram district of the Indian state of Andhra Pradesh.

== Geography ==
Lakkavarapukota is located at 18.0333°N 83.15°E. It has an average elevation of 60 meters (200 feet).

== Demography ==
Lakkavarapukota Mandal has a population of 74,413 in 2001. Males consists of 25,267 and females 25.270 of the population. The average literacy rate is 52%, below the national average of 59.5%. Male literacy rate is 65% and that of females 39%.
