= Poosapatirega =

Poosay
- village
- Interactive map of Poosay
- Location in Andhra Pradesh, India Poosay (India)
- Coordinates: 18.0919921°N 83.5522699°E
- Country: India
- State: Andhra Pradesh
- District: Vizianagaram

Languages
  - Official: Telugu
- Time zone: UTC+5:30 (IST)
- PIN: 535204
- Vehicle Registration: AP35 (Former); AP39 (from 30 January 2019)

Pusapatirega is a village and mandal in Vizianagaram district of the Indian state of Andhra Pradesh, India.

== Demography ==
Pusapatirega mandal has a population of 68,839 in 2001. Males constitutes 35,200 and females 33,639 of the population. The average literacy rate is 39%, very low when compared to the national average of 59.5%. Male literacy rate is 47% and female literacy rate 30%.

List of Villages in Pusapatirega Mandal

#	Villages	Administrative Division	Population
1	Alladapalem	Pusapatirega	1125
2	Bharanikam	Pusapatirega	557
3	Borravanipalem	Pusapatirega	305
4	Chinabattivalasa	Pusapatirega	631
5	Chintapalle	Pusapatirega	5717
6	Chodamma Agraharam	Pusapatirega	2313
7	Chowduvada	Pusapatirega	326
8	Gaitula Chodavaram	Pusapatirega	464
9	Govindapuram	Pusapatirega	1591
10	Gumpam	Pusapatirega	1420
11	Kamavaram	Pusapatirega	875
12	Kandivalasa	Pusapatirega	1731
13	Kanimella	Pusapatirega	1313
14	Kanimetta	Pusapatirega	1600
15	Kollayavalasa	Pusapatirega	1549
16	Konada	Pusapatirega	8071
17	Konayyapalem	Pusapatirega	539
18	Kopperla	Pusapatirega	2483
19	Kovvada Agraharam	Pusapatirega	1932
20	Krishnapuram	Pusapatirega	587
21	Kumili	Pusapatirega	5481
22	Lankalapallipalem	Pusapatirega	1013
23	Nadipalle	Pusapatirega	771
24	Palanki	Pusapatirega	309
25	Pasupam	Pusapatirega	1344
26	Pathivada	Pusapatirega	4109
27	Pedabattivalasa	Pusapatirega	332
28	Perapuram	Pusapatirega	2191
29	Poram	Pusapatirega	717
30	Pusapatipalem	Pusapatirega	684
31	Pusapatirega	Pusapatirega	5683
32	Rellivalasa	Pusapatirega	7599
33	Roluchappidi	Pusapatirega	641
34	Thottadam	Pusapatirega	913
35	Vempadam	Pusapatirega	3566
36	Yerukonda	Pusapatirega	1473

== Notable Personalities ==
Trailinga Swami - Hindu Mystic Yogi (Varanasi)
