= Merakamudidam =

Coordinates: 18°25′25″N 83°28′11″E

- Village
- Interactive map of Merakamudidam
- Country: India
- State: Andhra Pradesh
- District: Vizianagaram

Population (2001)
  - Total: 56,996

Languages
  - Official: Telugu
- Time zone: UTC+5:30 (IST)
- PIN: 535102
- Telephone code: 08952
- Vehicle Registration: AP35 (Former); AP39 (from 30 January 2019)
- Sex ratio: 0.998 ♂/♀

Merakamudidam is a village in Vizianagaram district of the Indian state of Andhra Pradesh, India.

== Demography ==
Merakamudidam mandal had a population of 56,703 in 2001, with 28,404 males and 28,299 females. The average literacy rate is 45%, with a male literacy rate is 57% and a female literacy rate of 32%.
