= Bondapalli =

- Village
- Interactive map of Bondapalli
- Location in Andhra Pradesh, India Bondapalli (India)
- Coordinates: 18.2418°N 83.3489°E
- Country: India
- State: Andhra Pradesh
- District: Vizianagaram

Languages
  - Official: Telugu
- Time zone: UTC+5:30 (IST)
- PIN: 535 260
- Vehicle registration: AP35

Bonda-palli is a village in Vizianagaram district of the Indian state of Andhra Pradesh, India.

== Demography ==
Bondapalli Mandal has a population of 50,473 in 2001. Males constitute 24,950 and females 25,523 of the population. The average literacy rate is 44%, below the national average of 59.5%. The male literacy rate is 56% and that of females 32%.
