= Garugubilli =

Coordinates: 18°47′36″N 83°32′11″E

- Village
- Interactive map of Garugubilli
- Country: India
- State: Andhra Pradesh
- District: Parvathipuram Manyam

Languages
  - Official: Telugu
- Time zone: UTC+5:30 (IST)
- PIN: 535463
- Vehicle registration: AP

Garugu-billi is a village in Parvathipuram Manyam district of the Indian state of Andhra Pradesh, India.

== Demography ==
Garugubilli mandal had a population of 50,690 in 2001: 25,388 male and 25,302 female. The average literacy rate is 54%. Male literacy rate is 68% and that of females is 39%.
