= Gantyada =

- Village
- Interactive map of Gantyada
- Location in Andhra Pradesh, India
- Coordinates: 18°08′52″N 83°18′08″E
- Country: India
- State: Andhra Pradesh
- District: Vizianagaram

Languages
  - Official: Telugu
- Time zone: UTC+5:30 (IST)
- Vehicle Registration: AP35 (Former); AP39 (from 30 January 2019)

Gantyada is a village in Vizianagaram district of the Indian state of Andhra Pradesh. This village is headquarter of Gantyada mandal.
