= Therlam =

- village
- Interactive map of Therlam
- Location in Andhra Pradesh, India
- Coordinates: 18.481°N 83.504°E
- Country: India
- State: Andhra Pradesh
- District: Vizianagaram

Languages
  - Official: Telugu
- Time zone: UTC+5:30 (IST)
- PIN: 535126
- Vehicle Registration: AP35 (Former); AP39 (from 30 January 2019)

Therlam is a village in Vizianagaram district of the Indian state of Andhra Pradesh, India.

== Demographics ==
Therlam Mandal has a population of 59,338 in 2001. Males consists of 29,745 and females 29,593 of the population. The average literacy rate is 48%. Male literacy rate is 62% and that of females 34%.

== Assembly constituency ==
Therlam was an Assembly constituency of the Andhra Pradesh Legislative Assembly, India until 2008. List of Members of Legislative Assembly:

- 1978 - Vasireddi Varada Ramarao, Indian National Congress
- 1983 - Tentu Jaya Prakash, Telugu Desam Party
- 1985 - Tentu Jaya Prakash, Telugu Desam Party
- 1989 - Tentu Jaya Prakash, Telugu Desam Party
- 1994 - Tentu Jaya Prakash, Telugu Desam Party
- 1999 - Vasireddi Varada Ramarao, Indian National Congress
- 2004 - Tentu Jaya Prakash, Telugu Desam Party

== List of Panchayati president details ==
- 2014 Present panchayati vice president is Mr. Marrapu Shankar Rao from Chinnayyapeta

== List of Mandal president details ==
- 2021 Present MPP is Mrs. Narsupalli Uma lakshmi W/O N. Babji Rao from therlam
