= Balijipeta =

- Village
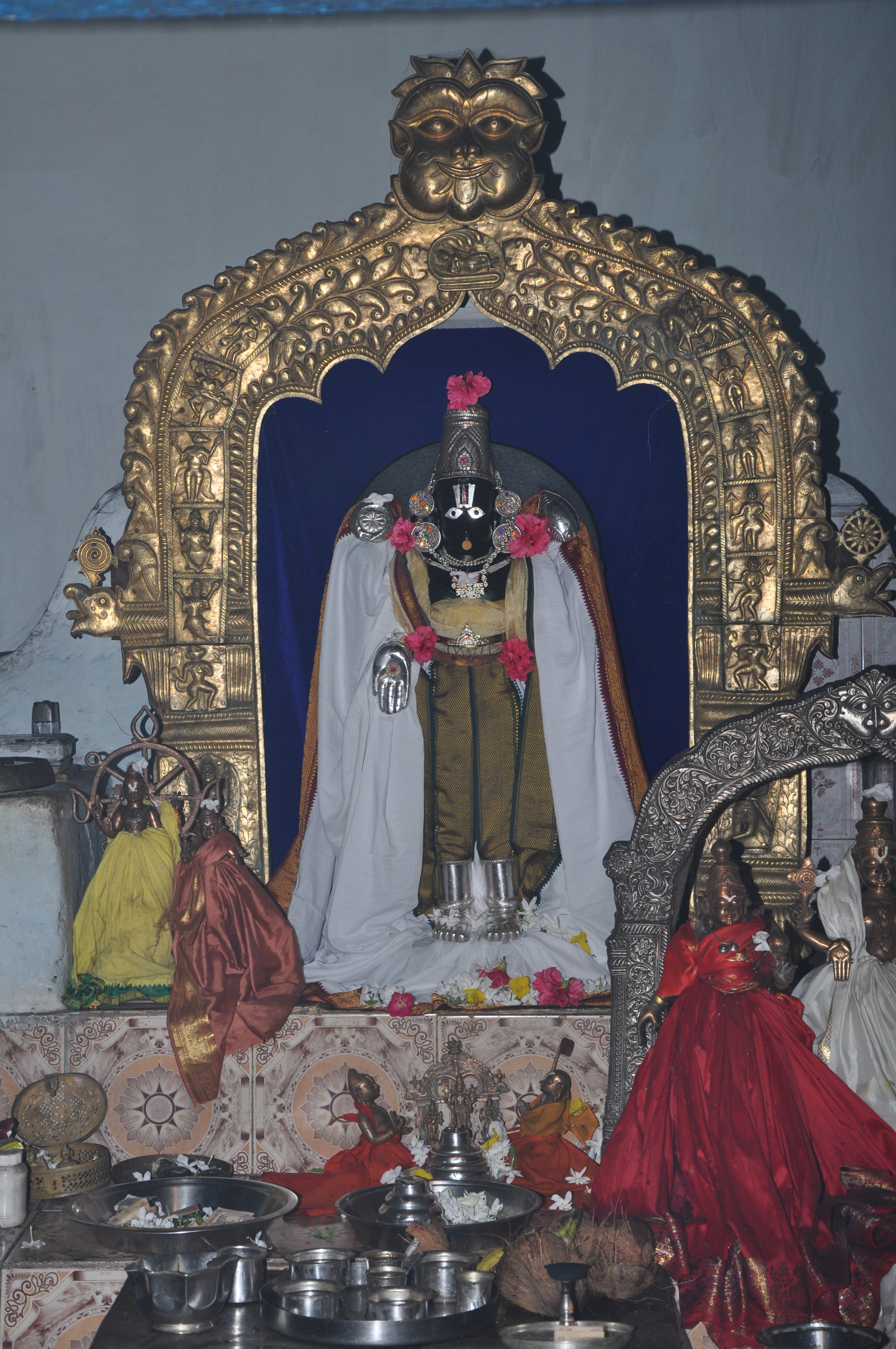
- Statue of Lord Balaji in Sri Venkateswar Swamy temple, Balijipeta
- Interactive map of Balijipeta
- Location in Andhra Pradesh, India Balijipeta (India)
- Coordinates: 18.613061°N 83.529475°E
- Country: India
- State: Andhra Pradesh
- District: Parvatipuram Manyam

Government
  - Body: panchayat raj
- Elevation: 76 m (249 ft)

Languages
  - Official: Telugu
- Time zone: UTC+5:30 (IST)
- PIN: 535557
- Vehicle Registration: AP35 (Former); AP39 (from 30 January 2019)

Baliji-peta or Baligi-peta is a village in Parvathipuram Manyam district of the Indian state of Andhra Pradesh.

== Geography ==
Balijipeta is located at 18.37°N 83.31°E. It has an average elevation of 76 metres (249 ft).It is 240 ft above sea level at the distance of 103 km from Visakhapatnam.

== Demography ==
Balijipeta mandal has a population of 62,787 in 2001. Males consists of 31,216 and females 31,571 of the population. The average literacy rate is 48% below the national average of 59.5%. Male literacy rate is 59% and that of females 33%.

== Assembly constituency ==
Balijipeta was a Legislative Assembly Constituency of Andhra Pradesh in 1955 and 1962. It was later merged with Vunukuru Constituency. Later has been considered in Parvathipuram Constituency.

- List of Elected Members:
- 1955 – Peddinti Ramaswamy Naidu.
- 1962 – Vasireddy Krishna Murthy Naidu.
