= Parvathipuram Manyam district =

District in Andhra Pradesh, India

Parvathipuram Manyam district Manyam district
- District of Andhra Pradesh
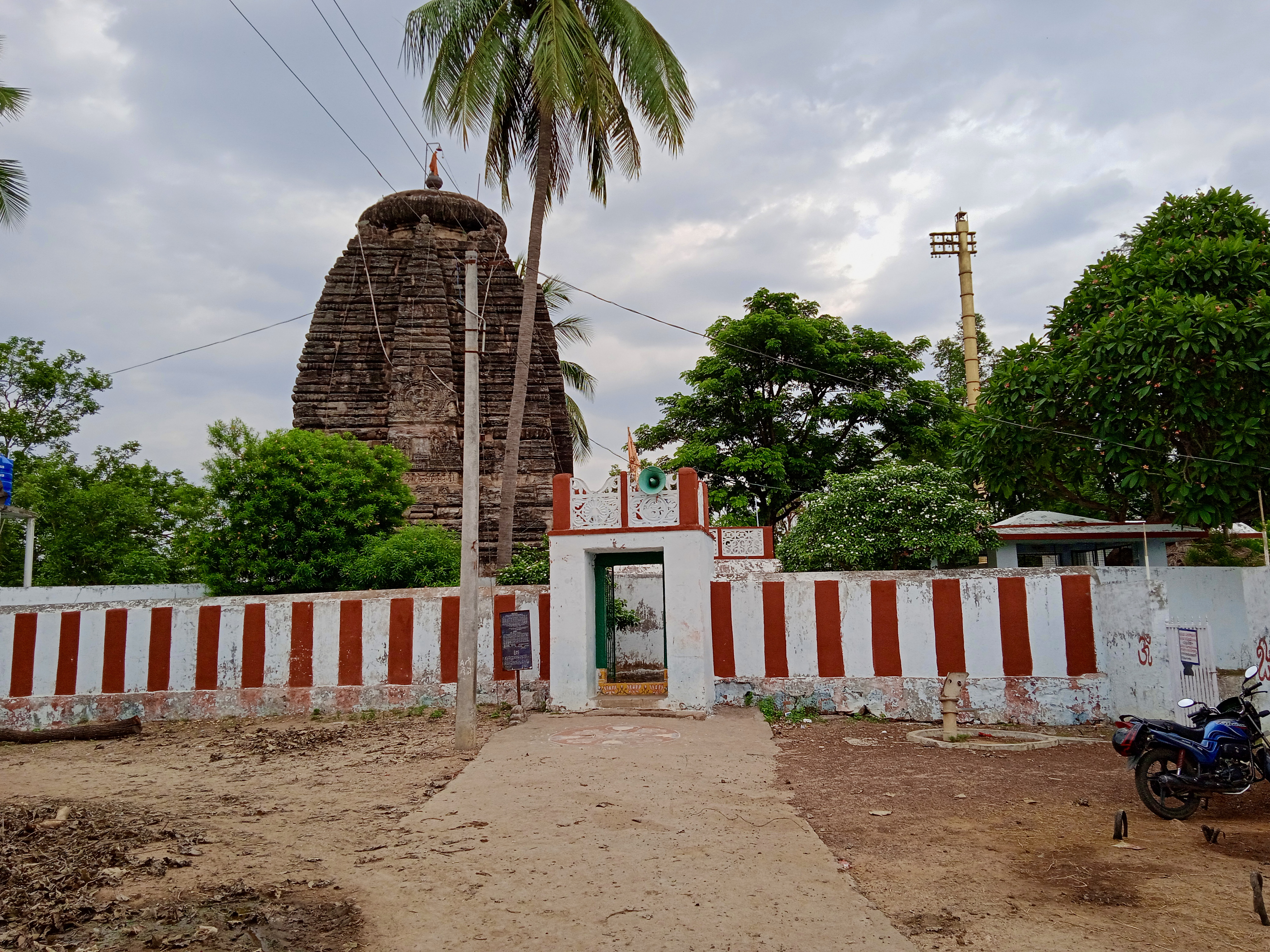
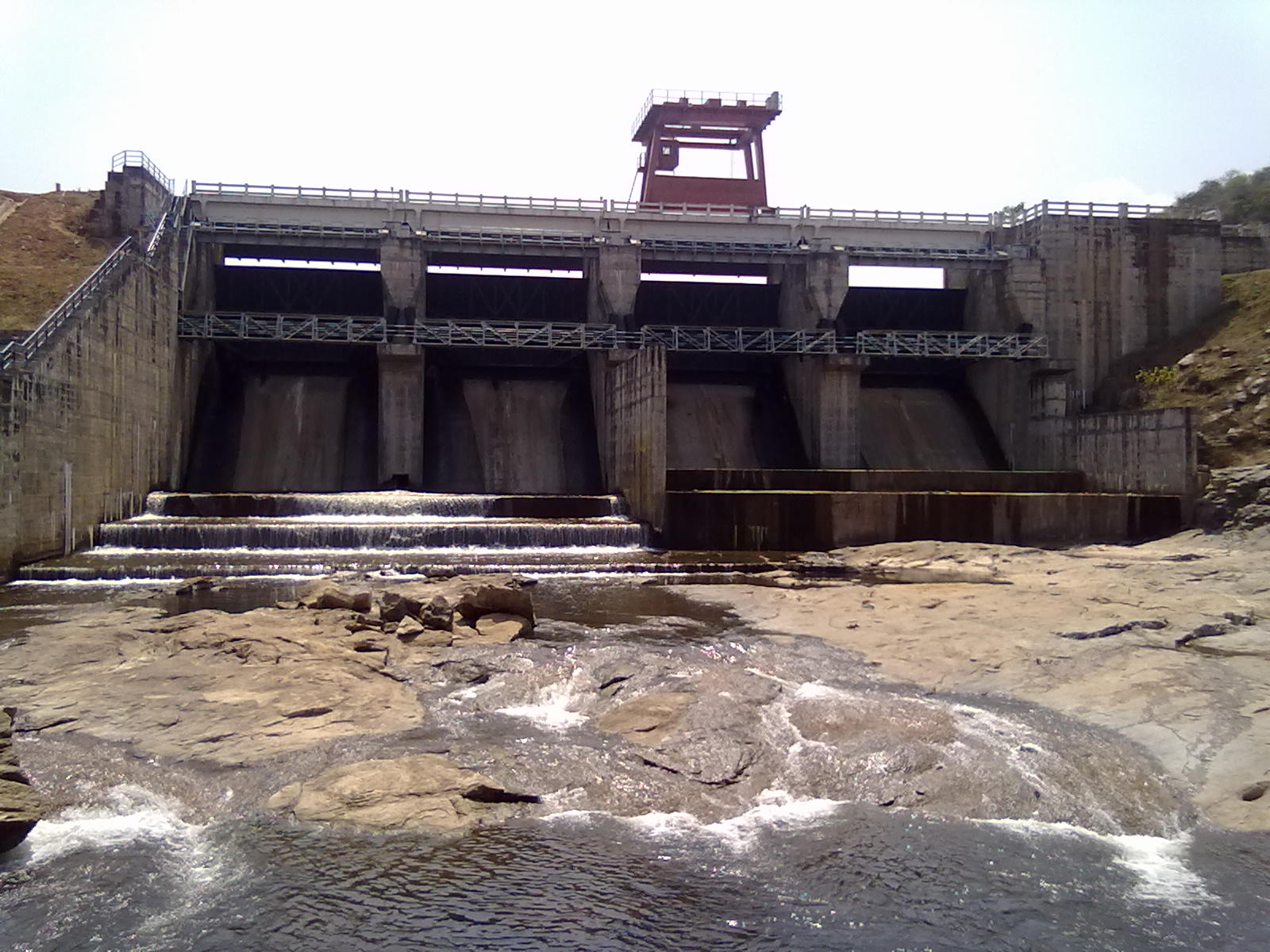
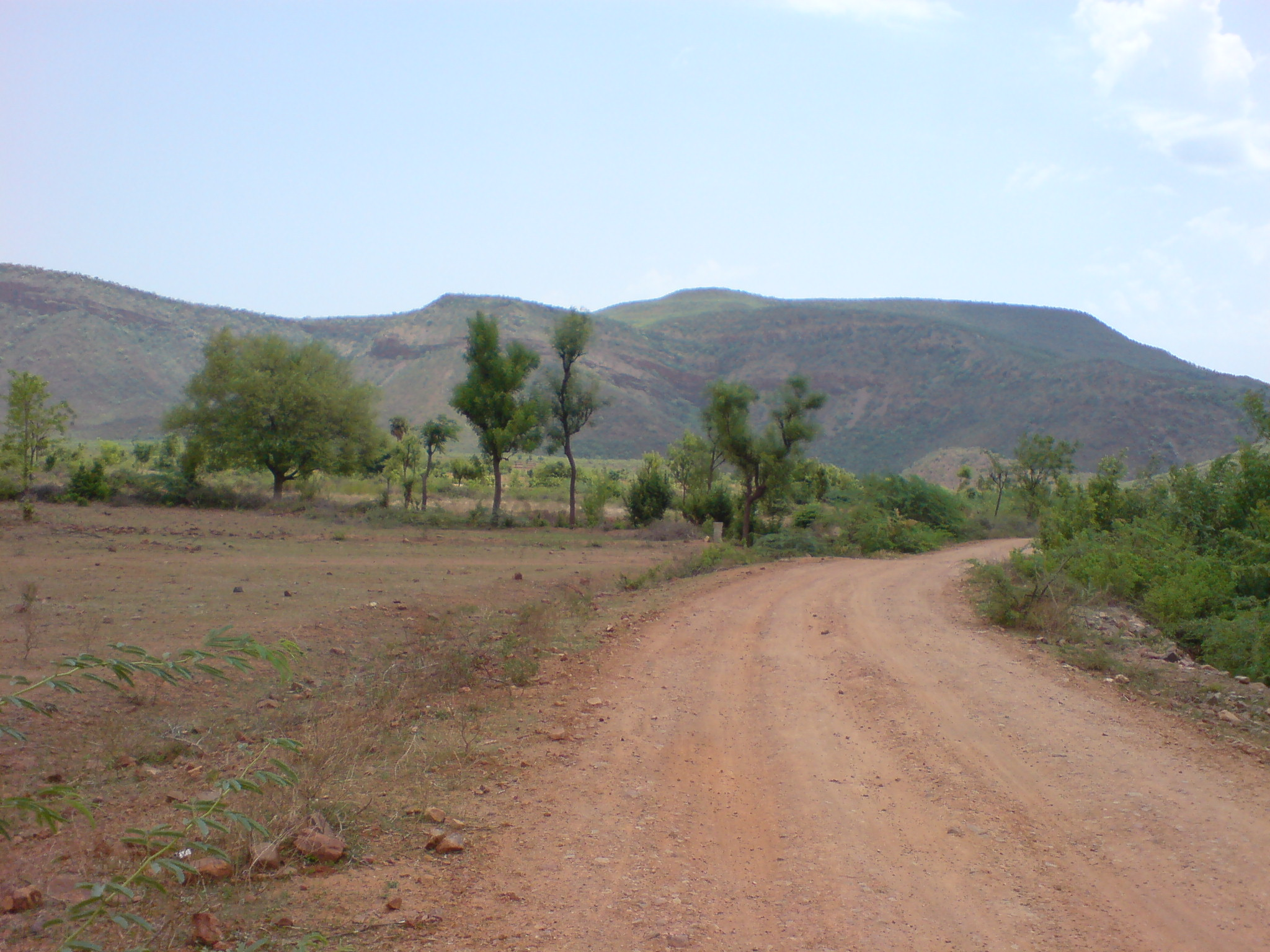
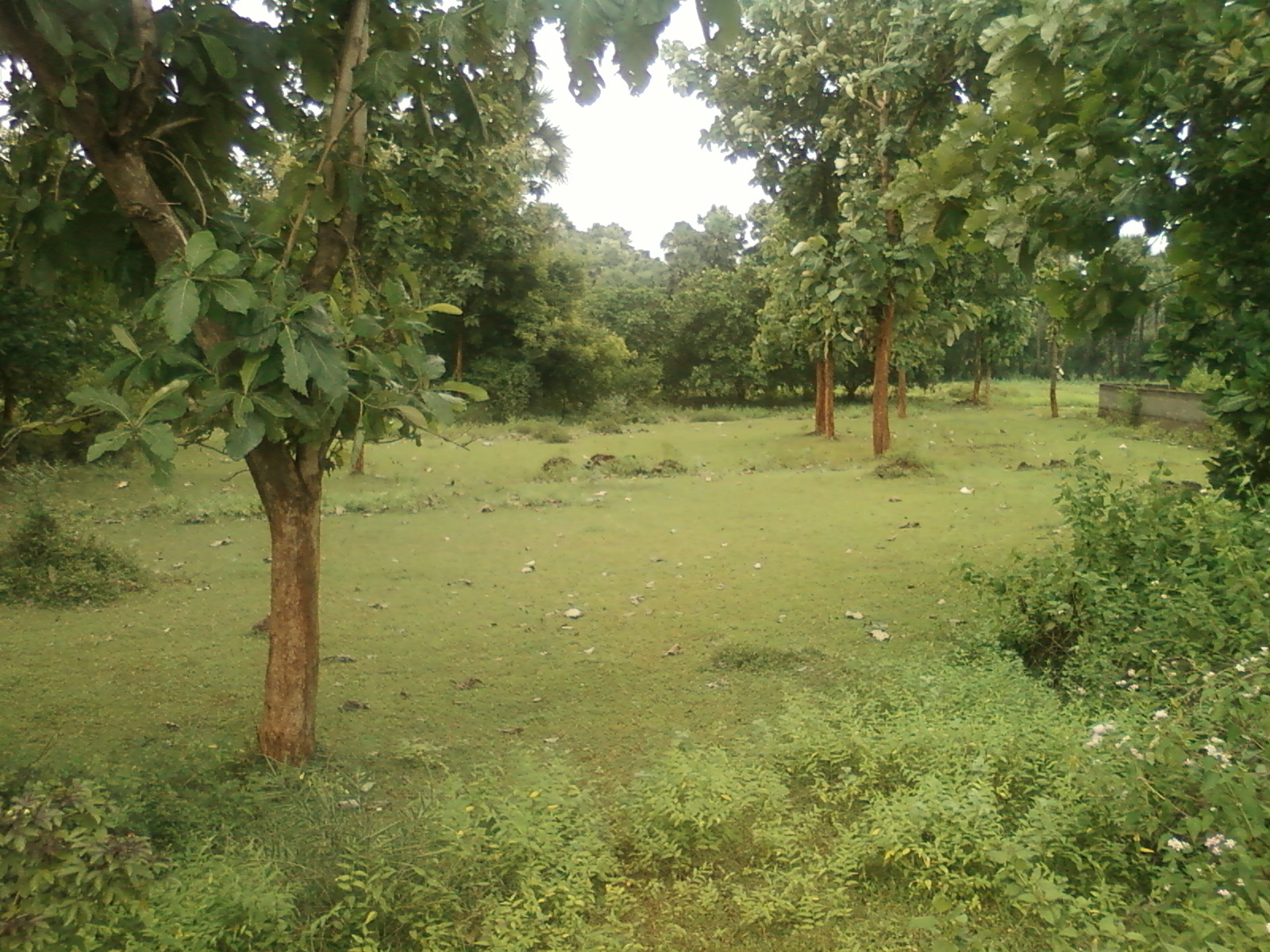
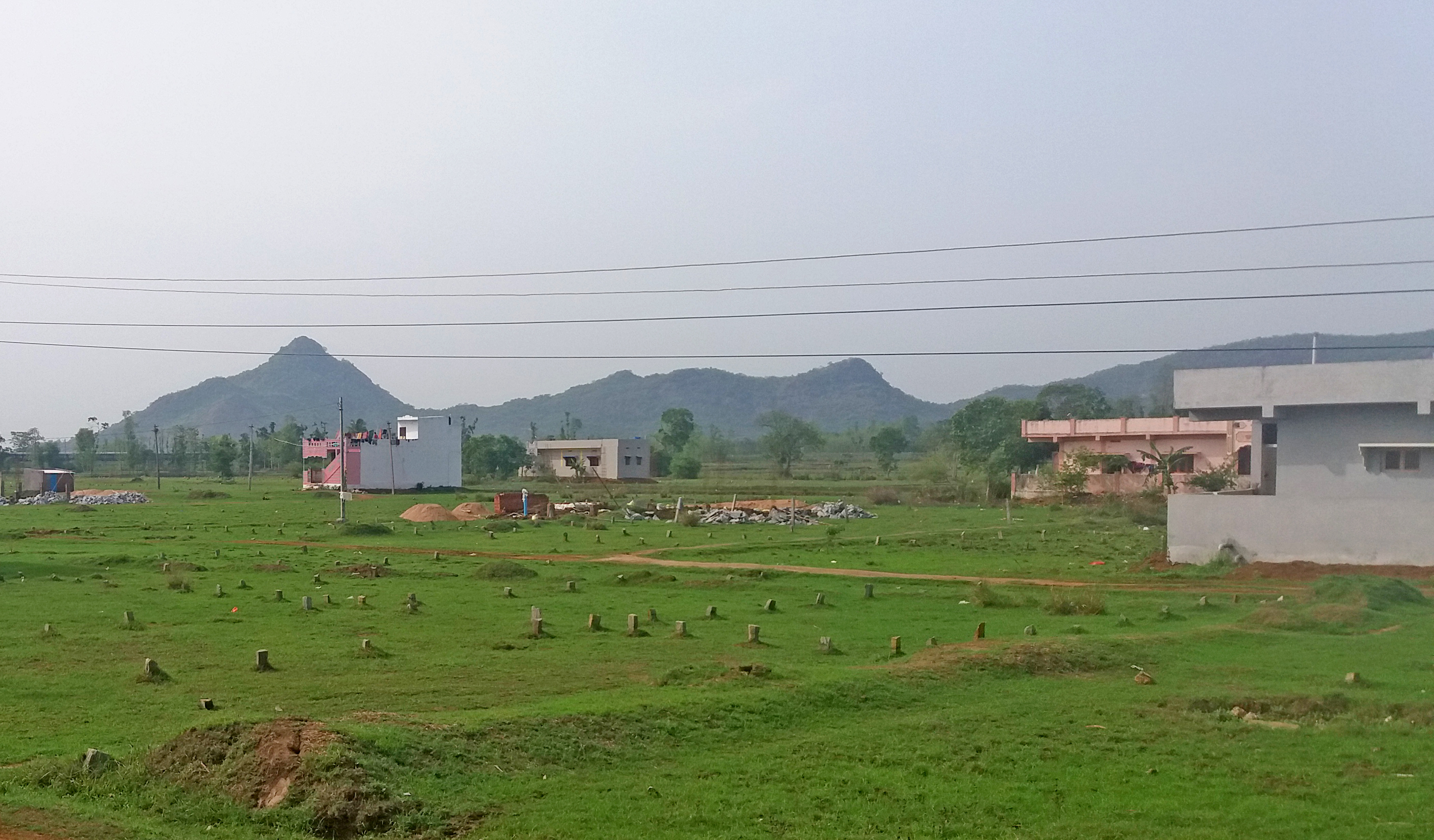
- Kamalingeshwara Temple in Gallavilli, Pedda Gedda Dam, Teak plantations near Salur, View of Eastern Ghats from Parvathipuram, View near Palakonda

- Parvathipuram Manyam district in Andhra Pradesh
- Interactive map of Parvathipuram Manyam district
- Coordinates: 18.8°N 83.4°E
- Country: India
- State: Andhra Pradesh
- Region: Uttara Andhra
- Headquarters: Parvathipuram
- Largest city: Parvathipuram

Government
  - District collector: A. Shyam Prasad, I.A.S
  - Lok Sabha constituencies: Araku
  - Assembly constituencies: 04

Area
  - Total: 3,659 km^{2} (1,413 sq mi)

Population (2011)
  - Total: 925,340
  - Density: 252.9/km^{2} (655.0/sq mi)
  - Urban: 124,104
- Time zone: UTC+05:30 (IST)
- District LGD code: 743
- District abbreviation: PRV
- Website: parvathipurammanyam.ap.gov.in

Parvathipuram Manyam district is a district in the Indian state of Andhra Pradesh. With Parvathipuram as its administrative headquarters, it became functional from 4 April 2022. The district was formed from Parvathipuram revenue division from Vizianagaram district and part of Palakonda revenue division of Srikakulam district. The district was once part of ancient Kalinga. The famous Kamalingeswara swamy temple was built in the regin of King Rajaraja Deva of Eastern Ganga Dynasty of Odisha in 11th century CE.

== Geography ==
This district is located between northern latitude of 18.8, eastern longitude of 83.4. This district is bounded by Koraput district of Odisha state in the north, by Vizianagaram district, Srikakulam district in the south, and Alluri Sitharama Raju district in the west and Rayagada district of Odisha state in the east.

== Politics ==
There are one parliamentary and 4 assembly constituencies in Parvathipuram Manyam district. The parliamentary constituencies are

- Araku (ST) (Lok Sabha constituency)

The assembly constituencies are

Constituency number	Name	Reserved for (SC/ST/None)	Lok Sabha constituency
10	Parvathipuram	SC	Araku
11	Palakonda	ST	Araku
12	Kurupam	ST	Araku
13	Salur	ST	Araku

== Administrative divisions ==
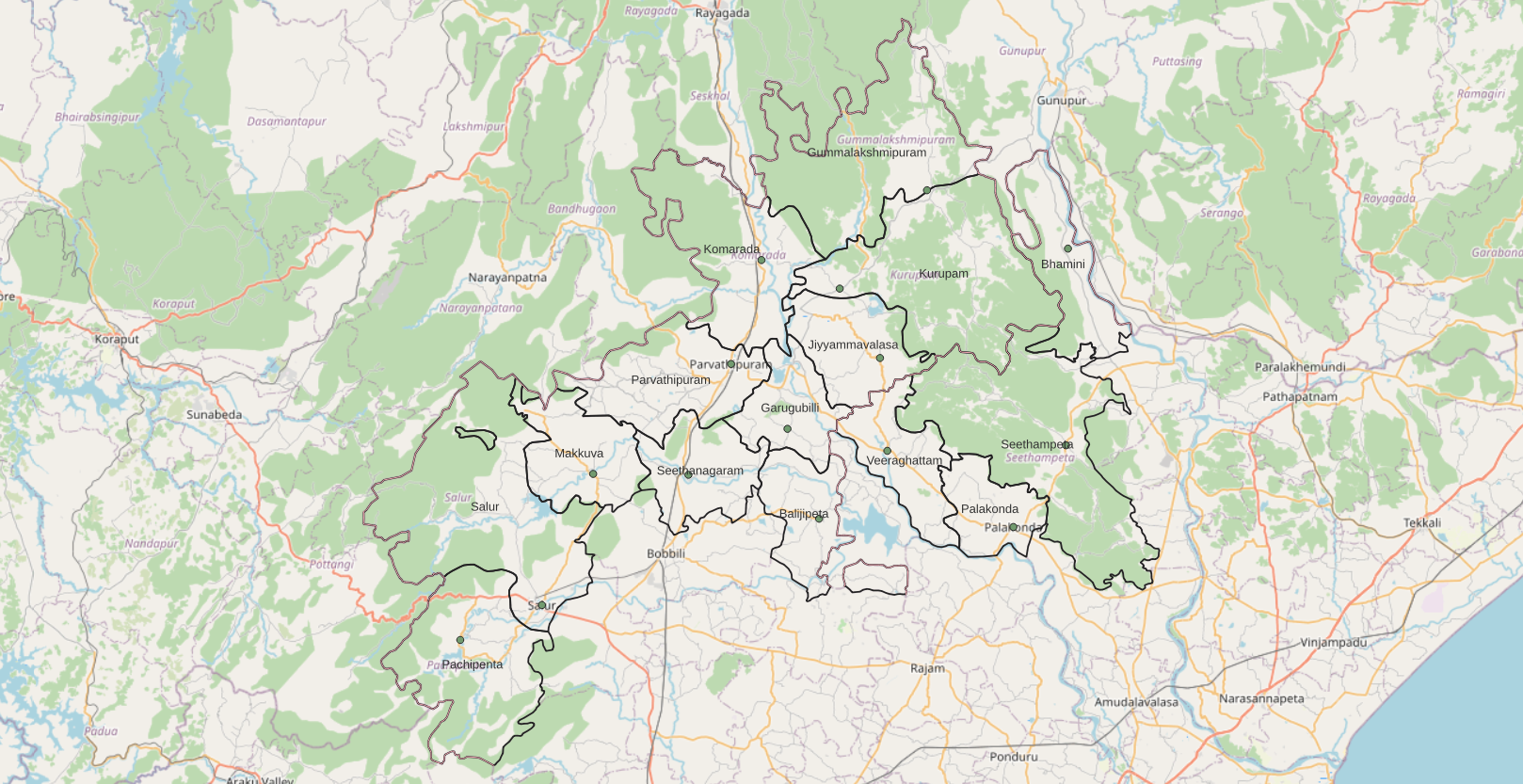
Satellite view of Parvathipuram Manyam district

The district is divided into 2 revenue divisions: Palakonda and Parvathipuram, which are further subdivided into a total of 15 mandals, each headed by a sub-collector.

=== Mandals ===
The list of 15 mandals in Parvathipuram Manyam district, divided into 2 revenue divisions, is given below.

1. Palakonda revenue division
  1. Jiyyammavalasa
  2. Gummalaxmipuram
  3. Kurupam
  4. Palakonda
  5. Seethampeta
  6. Bhamini
  7. Veeraghattam
2. Parvathipuram revenue division
  1. Parvathipuram
  2. Seethanagaram
  3. Balijipeta
  4. Salur
  5. Panchipenta
  6. Makkuva
  7. Komarada
  8. Garugubilli

=== Cities and towns ===
Major cities and towns with population as per 2011 census
place	type	division	population
Parvathipuram	Municipality	Parvathipuram Division	53,844
Salur	Municipality	Parvathipuram Division	49,500
Palakonda	Nagar panchayat	Palakonda Division	20,760

== Demographics ==
Religions in Parvathipuram Manyam district (2011)
Religion	Percent
Hinduism	97.69%
Christianity	1.53%
Other or not stated	0.78%
Distribution of religions

At the time of the 2011 census the district had a population of 9,25,340, of which 124,104 (13.41%) live in urban areas. Parvathipuram Manyam district has a sex ratio of 1035 females per 1000 males and a literacy rate of 50.90%. Scheduled Castes and Scheduled Tribes make up 1,10,169 (11.91%) and 2,60,419 (28.14%) of the population respectively.

Languages of Parvathipuram Manyam district (2011)
1. Telugu (89.0%)
2. Sora (5.86%)
3. Kuvi (2.15%)
4. Others (2.99%)

At the time of the 2011 census, 89.00% of the population spoke Telugu, 5.86% Sora and 2.15% Kuvi as their first language.
