= History of Andhra Pradesh =

The recorded history of Andhra Pradesh, one of the 28 states of 21st-century India, begins in the Vedic period. It is mentioned in Sanskrit epics such as the Aitareya Brahmana (800 BCE). Its sixth-century BCE incarnation Assaka lay between the Godavari and Krishna Rivers, one of sixteen mahajanapadas (700–300 BCE). The Satavahanas succeeded them (230 BCE–220 CE), built Amaravati, and reached a zenith under Gautamiputra Satakarni.

After the Satavahanas, the region fragmented into fiefdoms. By the late second century CE, Andhra Ikshvakus ruled along the Krishna River. In the fourth century CE, the Pallava dynasty ruled southern Andhra Pradesh and Tamilakam, and had a capital at Kanchipuram. Their power increased in the reigns of Mahendravarman I (571–630) and Narasimhavarman I (630–668), and dominated northern Tamilakam and the southern Telugu-speaking region until the end of the ninth century.Northern Andhra Pradesh was under Vengi Chalukyas starting from 624 CE. Later during 1002 CE Vengi Chalukyas became subordinate to the Imperial Cholas when Rajaraja Chola I helped Vengi Chalukyas to secure the Vengi throne from Telugu Chola king Jata Choda Bhima. From 1002 CE till 1206 CE Andhra Pradesh was under Imperial Cholas.

From 1206 CE to 1323 CE the Kakatiya dynasty unified the land and in that golden age Tikkana’s translation of the Mahabharata founded Telugu literature. In 1258 CE, Pandyan emperor Jatavarman Sundara Pandyan I defeated Nellore Cholas and Kakatiyas, extending the Pandyan empire as far as Nellore. Kakatiyas unified the Andhra again during internal crisis in Pandyan empire. In 1323 CE, Ghiyath al-Din Tughluq, sultan of Delhi, sent a large army under Ulugh Khan to lay siege to Warangal. After the Kakatiya dynasty fell, the Delhi Sultanate, and the Persio-Tajik sultanate of central India competed for the region. Reddi Kingdom (1325-1448) emerged under Prolaya Vema Reddy and successors ruled parts of this region in the early 14th century to mid 15th century, ruled over 120 years. Reddy kings constructed Kondaveedu Fort and Kondapalli Fort. Reddy kings ruled entire Coastal Andhra and parts of Tamil Nadu between 1325-1448. In the end the Musunuri Nayaks won over Delhi.

Under Krishnadevaraya of the Vijayanagara Empire (1336 CE–1646 CE) the Telugus became independent, then the Qutb Shahi dynasty ruled the Bahmani Sultanate there from the early 16th to the end of the 17th centuries, and was tolerant of Telugu culture.

The French, under the Marquis de Bussy-Castelnau, and the English, under Robert Clive, altered the regional polity. In 1765 CE, Clive and the chief and council at Visakhapatnam obtained the Northern Circars from Mughal emperor Shah Alam. The British later defeated Maharaja Vijaya Rama Gajapati Raju of Vizianagaram, in 1792 CE.

Andhra State was created in the year 1953 CE. Potti Sriramulu had campaigned for a state independent of the Madras Presidency, and Tanguturi Prakasam Pantulu's social-reform movements led to the founding of Andhra State, with a capital at Kurnool and freedom-fighter Pantulu as its first chief minister.

India became independent in 1947. The Nizam of Hyderabad, Mir Osman Ali Khan, wanted to remain independent, but in 1948 the Indian Army annexed Hyderabad to the Dominion of India, where it became Hyderabad State. Andhra Pradesh, the first Indian state formed primarily on the basis of language post independence, split off from the Madras Presidency in 1953. Andhra State merged with the Telugu-speaking portion of Hyderabad State in 1956 to create the state of Andhra Pradesh. Neelam Sanjiva Reddy became the first Chief Minister of Andhra Pradesh.

The Lok Sabha formed Telangana from ten districts of Andhra Pradesh on 18 February 2014.

== Pre-Satavahana period ==
=== Chalcolithic age ===
The Chalcolithic period is dated using pottery and is believed to be around 1750 BC or earlier. The pottery used for dating the time period was discovered from sites near the Krishna and Tungabhadra rivers such as Patapadu. A painted spouted vessel found there resembles chalcolithic-age vessels from Navdatoli and as far as Bronze Age Crete.

Great Stupa of Amaravati

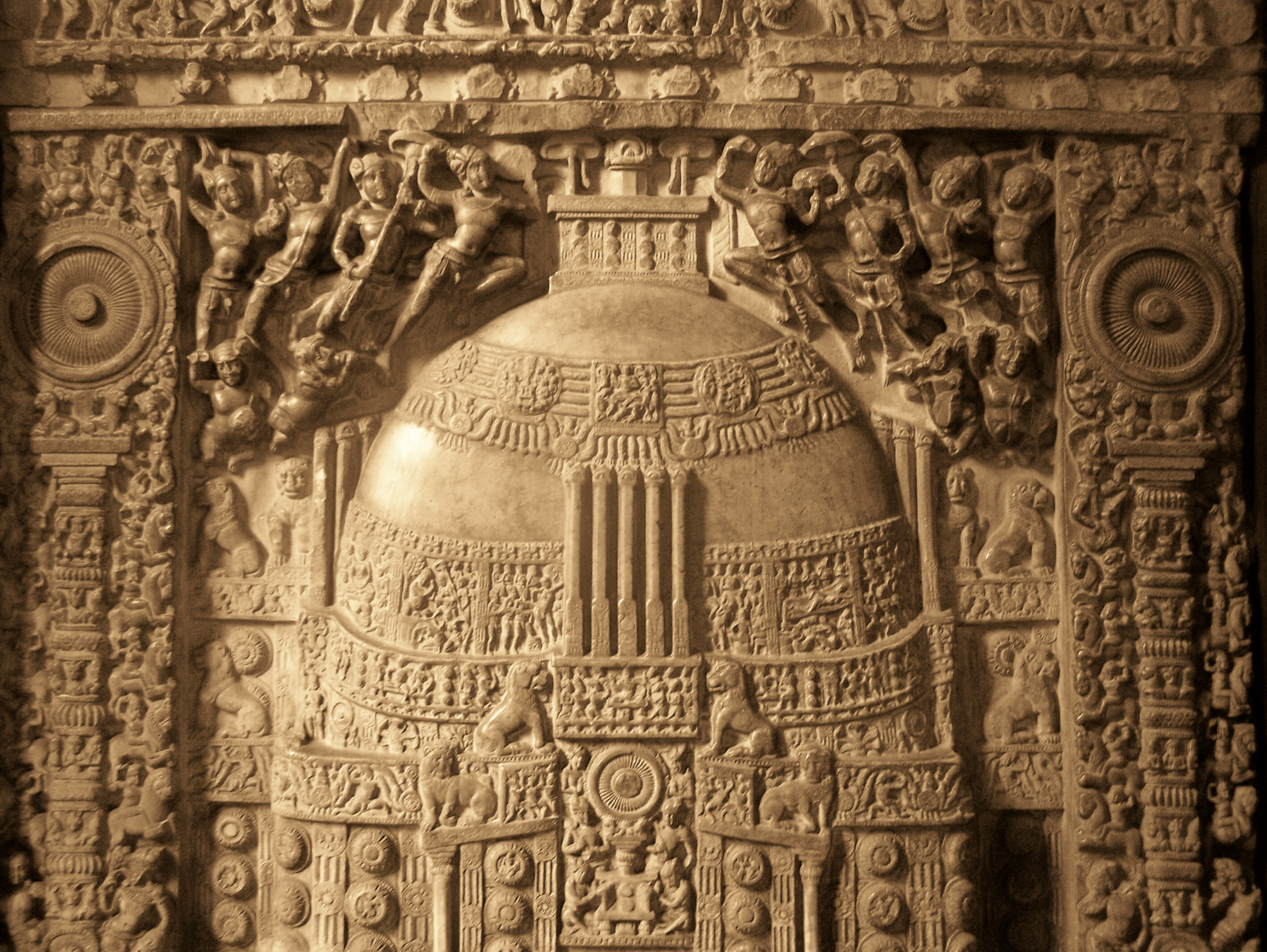
Sculpture depicting the stupa, now at the Government Museum, Chennai.

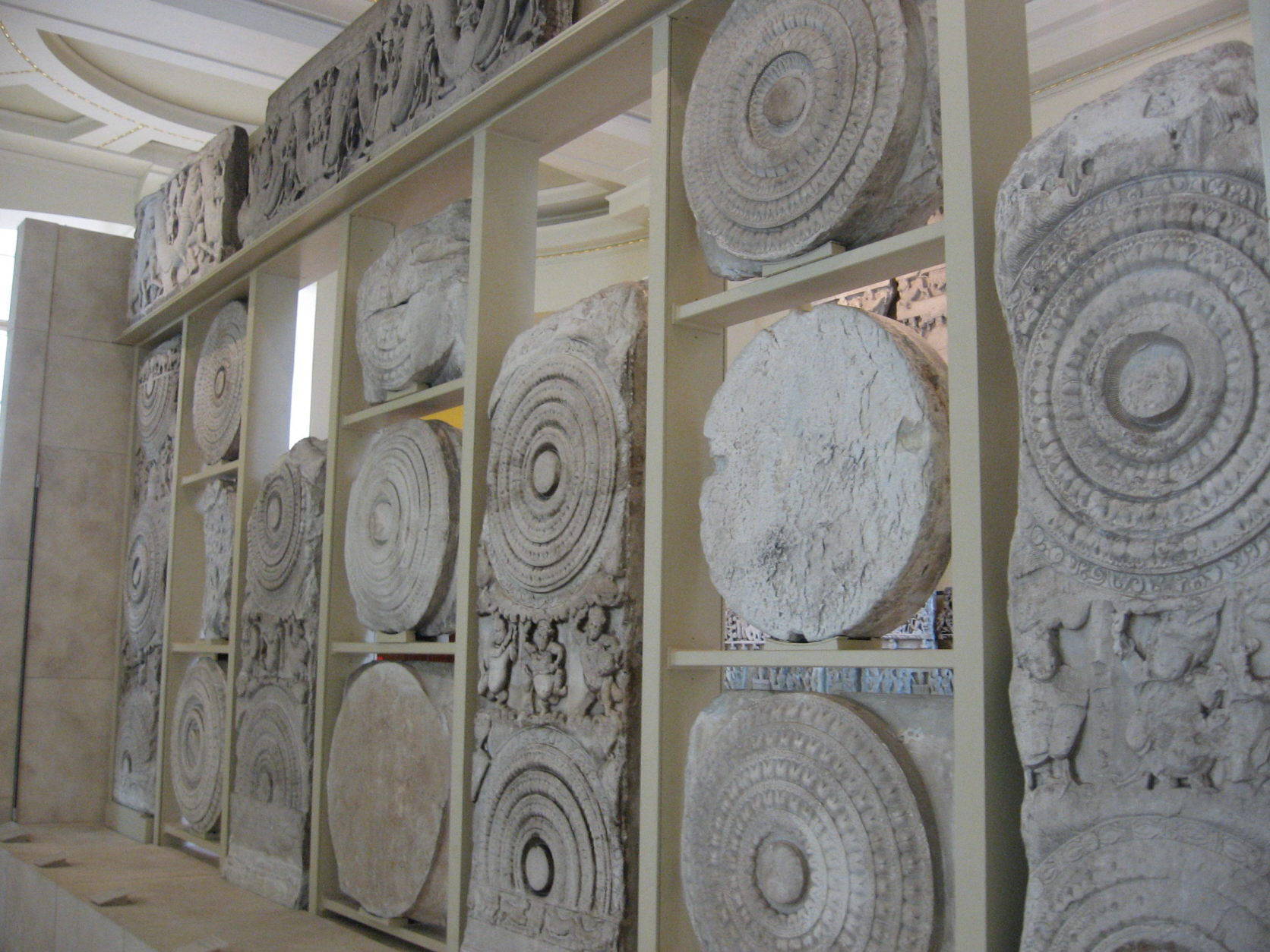
Amaravati Marbles, a series of marble sculptures and inscriptions excavated from the site.

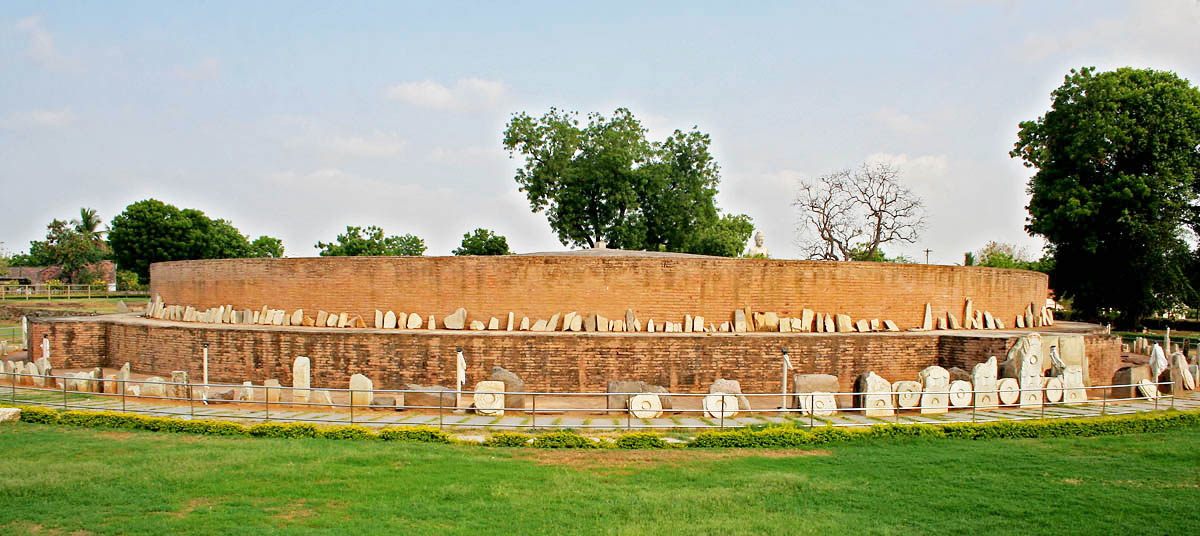
The surviving foundation of the stupa.

The Amaravati Mahachaitya, also known as the Great Stupa of Amaravati, was built around the third century BCE.

=== Proto-Historic and Historic periods ===
The term Andhra was first mentioned as the name of a tribe in the Aitareya Brahamana, datable to 800 B.C. Andhras left the north of the Indian subcontinent near the Yamuna river, crossed the Vindhyas and came to present-day Andhra Pradesh and Telangana. It also mentions that the Andhras were socially parallel to other tribes like the Pundras, Sabaras and Pulindas. There are references to an Andhra kingdom and a people known as the Andhras in Indian epic poetry (the Mahabharata, the Ramayana and the Puranas). In the Mahabharata Rukmi ruled the Vidarbha Kingdom, which included the Deccan Plateau, the foothills of the Vindhya Range, present-day Andhra Pradesh, Maharashtra, Madhya Pradesh and Karnataka and a little-known (now submerged) archipelago in the Bay of Bengal. Rama is said to have lived in the forest around present-day Bhadrachalam during his exile.

Ancient literature indicates a history dating to several centuries BCE, but archaeological evidence exists only from the last two millennia. The fifth-century Kingdom of Pratipalapura, identified with Bhattiprolu in the Guntur district of Andhra Pradesh, may have been the earliest kingdom in South India. Inscriptions suggest that King Kubera ruled Bhattiprolu around 230 BCE.

The script of the Bhattiprolu inscriptions was the progenitor of the Brahmi lipi, which later diversified into modern Telugu scripts.

== Middle Kingdoms (3rd century BCE - 12th century CE) ==
=== Satavahana dynasty ===
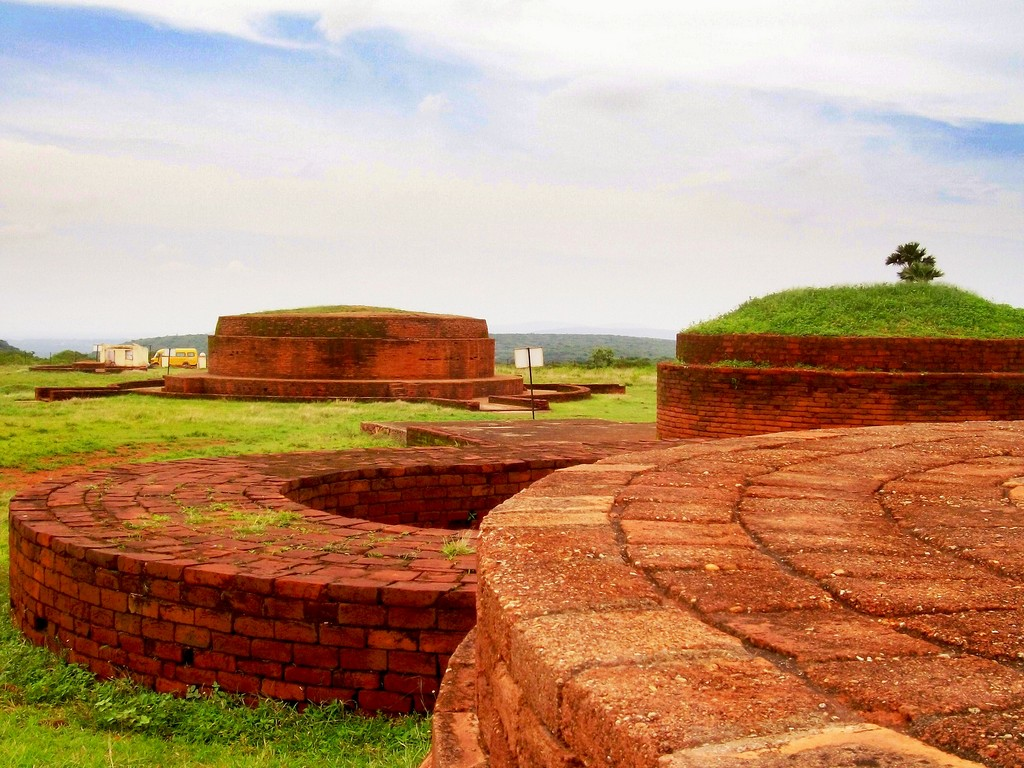
Archaeological remains of Bavikonda.

As part of the Mauryan Empire during the fourth century BCE, Andhra was a political state in the southeastern Deccan. According to Megasthenes, who visited the court of Chandragupta Maurya (322–297), the Andhras had 30 fortified towns along Godavari River and an army of 1,00,000 infantry, 2,000 cavalry and 1,000 elephants. The military might of Andhras was second only to the Mauryas.

Uninterrupted political and cultural accounts of Andhra Pradesh begin during the rise of the Satavahana dynasty. According to the Matsya Purana, the dynasty had 29 rulers in a 456-year period from the second century BCE to the second century CE. An inscription at Nasik, written at the time of Gautamiputra Satakarni (the 23rd Satavahana ruler), indicates that the kingdom included most of the southern peninsula and southern parts of Maharashtra, Orissa and Madhya Pradesh. The court language used by the Satavahanas was Prakrit, and their kings observed the Vedic religion.

The fall of the Satavahana empire left Andhra in political chaos, and local rulers carved out small kingdoms for themselves. Between 180 and 624 CE, control of Andhra lay with the Ikshvaku, Bruhatpalayana, Salankayana, Vishnukundina, Vakataka, Pallava, Ananda Gotrika, Kalinga and other small kingdoms; the most important was Ikshvaku. Sanskrit replaced Prakrit as the inscriptional language at this time.

=== Ikshvakus ===
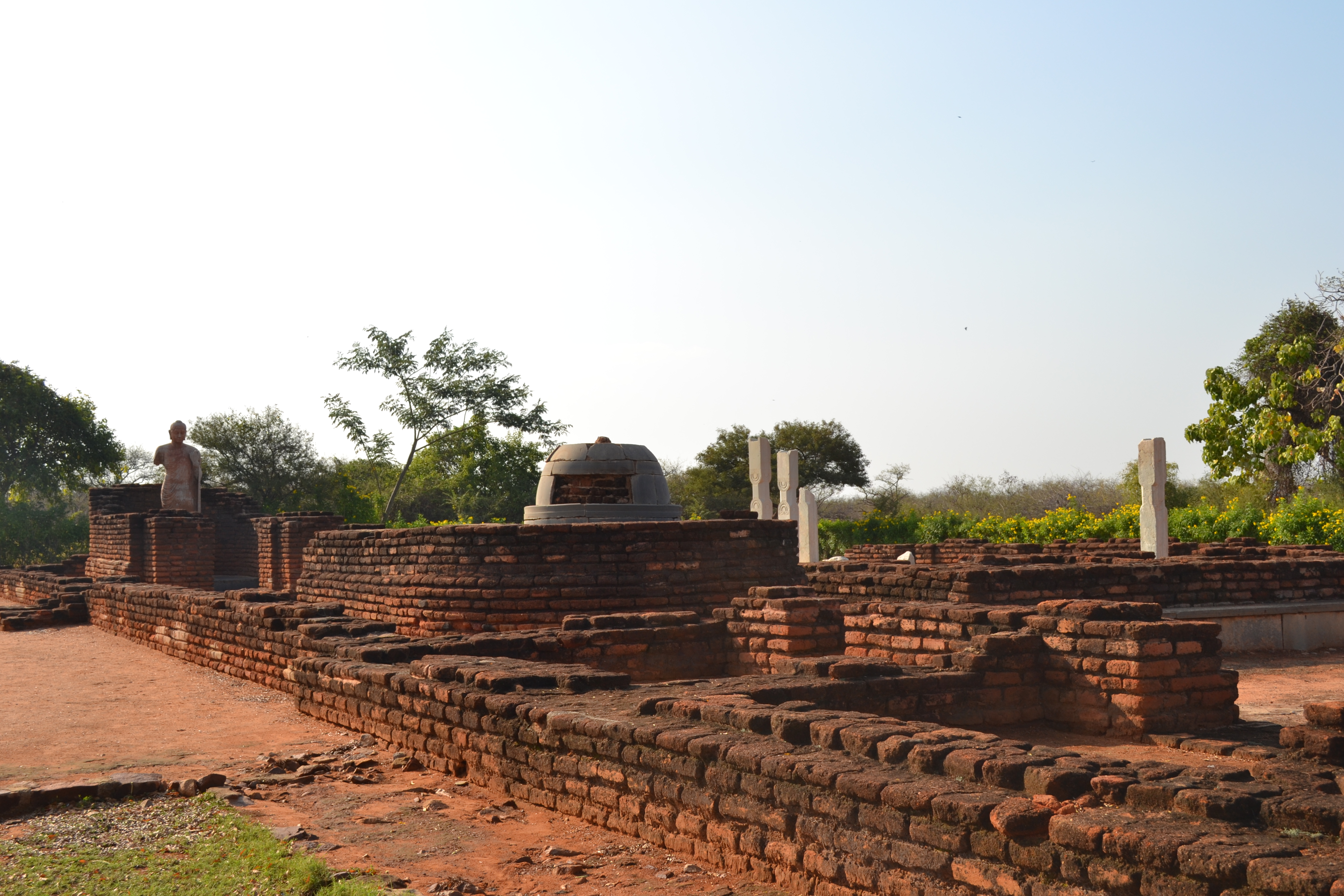
Nagarjunakonda, which is believed to be the site of the Andhra Ikshvaku capital.

The Andhra Ikshvakus (Sanskrit: इक्श्वाकू) established a kingdom along the Krishna River in the second half of the second century CE. Their capital was Vijayapuri (Nagarjunakonda). Archaeological evidence indicates that the Ikshvakus succeeded the Satavahanas in the Krishna River valley and may have entered Andhra from the north. The Ikshvakus left inscriptions at Nagarjunakonda, Jaggayyapeta, Amaravati and Bhattiprolu, and their rulers observed the Vedic religion.

Some historians believe that Andhra Ikshvakus were related to the mythological Ikshvakus, while some believe Andhra Ikshvakus to be a local tribe who adopted the title. Some scholars believe that this dynasty was related to the ancient Ikshvakus of the Hindu epics, and Rama of the Ramayana, the incarnation of Vishnu, was descended from the Ikshvaku line. Inscriptions in the Nagarjunakonda valley, Jaggayyapeta and Ramireddipalli provide some support for this hypothesis.

In the Vayu Purana, Manu (the patriarch of ancient India) had nine sons; Ikshvaku, the eldest, founded the Suryavamsha dynasty and ruled from Ayodhya at the beginning of the Treta Yuga. He had 100 sons; the eldest was Vikushi, who succeeded his father as the ruler of Ayodhya. Fifty of Vikushi's brothers founded small principalities in North India, and forty-eight founded kingdoms in the south. In the Dharmamrita, during the lifetime of the 12th tirthankara, Yasodhara (an Ikshvaku prince from the kingdom of Anga) went to Vengi. The prince was so impressed with the region's beauty and fertility that he made it his home and founded the city of Pratipalapura (present-day Bhattiprolu).

In the Puranas, the Andhra Ikshvakus are called Sriparvatiyas (rulers of Sriparvata) and Andhrabhrityas (servants of the Andhras). They were feudal lords of the Satavahanas, and bore the title of Mahatalavara. Although the Puranas cite seven kings ruling Andhra for 100 years, only four are confirmed in inscriptions.

==== Vashishthiputra Sri Santamula (Santamula I) ====
Santamula I founded the Ikshvaku dynasty, performing the Ashvamedha, Agnihotra, Agnistoma and Vajapeya yagnas to proclaim his imperial status. Rulers of subsequent dynasties commonly performed the Ashvamedha yagna to declare their independence.

==== Virapurushadatta ====
Virapurushadatta was the son and successor of Santamula through his wife, Madhari. He had a sister, Adavi Santisri, took a queen from the Saka family of Ujjain and gave his daughter in marriage to a Chutu prince.

==== Ehuvula Santamula (Santamula II) ====
Ehuvula Santamula (Santamula II), Virapurushadata's son, ruled after a short Abhira interregnum.

==== Rudrapurushadatta ====
Rudrapurushadatta was an Ikshvaku ruler mentioned in inscriptions from Gurajala in Guntur district. Possibly a son of Ehuvula Santamula, he ruled for over 11 years.

=== Bruhatpalayanas ===
During the third century CE, the Bruhatpalayanas ruled northern Andhra from their capital, Kodur, in the Krishna district.

=== Anandagotrikas ===
The Ananda Gotrikas (335–425) ruled coastal Andhra from their capital, Kapotapuram. Their affiliations are unknown. A few Anandagotras families have been discovered in the Anantapur district and Kadiri taluk. It is an old Kadapa district: Hiranya Raajya, in the Puranas. Anandagotras live in Cedaranya of Kadhiri area hill/mountain places called Batrapalli forest, Gogannapeta, Pandava Raju hill and Vankapalli. Old andha/kandarapuram have been demolished. Kambamraayudu mountain hill areas' surname is tatam in patras.

=== Salankayanas ===
From about 300 to 440, after the fall of the Ikshvakus, the Salankayanas ruled part of the east coast from Vengi. Like the Vishnukundinas of Vinukonda who succeeded them, the Salankayanas were vassals of the Pallavas of the southern Telugu and northern Tamil lands. At this time, Telugu and Kannada scripts began to separate from those of other Indian dialects.

=== Pallavas ===
The Pallava dynasty ruled South India from the fourth to the ninth centuries from Kanchipuram in Tamil Nadu. It was ascendant during the reigns of Mahendravarman I (590–630) and Narasimhavarman I (630–668) and included the southern Telugu and the north of the Tamil regions.

The Pallavas were noted for their patronage of Dravidian architecture, examples of which survive in Mahabalipuram. The Chinese traveller Xuanzang visited Kanchipuram under Pallava rule, and extolled its benign government. The period was characterized by conflict with the Chalukyas of Badami in the north and the Tamil states of Chola and Pandyas in the south. During the ninth century, the Pallavas were succeeded by the Chola dynasty

=== Vishnukundinas ===
The Vishnukundina dynasty ruled in the Deccan and South India in the fifth and sixth centuries CE. Early rulers of the dynasty allied with the Vakatakas and the Rashtrakutas by marriage.

In 529, Madhava Varma (a descendant of the dynasty) and four allied clans achieved independence by defeating the Salankayanas in coastal Andhra.

=== Kalachuris of Chedi ===
The Matsyas, Chedis, Pericchedis, Haihayas and Kalachuris may share a common Vedic ancestry and origin myth, but the link is tenuous. In the Puranas, Matsya (Sanskrit for "fish") was the name of a tribe (Meenas) and a state under the Vedic civilisation. The Matsya tribe was founded by a fisherman who became a king. The Mahabharata (V.74.16) describes King Sahaja as a son of Uparichara Vasu, a Chedi king. Vasu ruled the Chedis and the Matsyas, suggesting the Matsya were once part of the Chedi kingdom. The Puranas mention six Matsya kingdoms, and the Pandya Kingdom in the south has a fish on its banner. Signs of the Matsya were later found in the Visakhapatnam region.

==== Chedi ====
The Chedi kingdom, in central and western India, was first ruled by Paurava kings and later by Yadav kings. It corresponds roughly to the present-day Bundelkhand region of Madhya Pradesh.

==== Haihaya ====
The Haihaya kingdom (haya means "horse") was one of a number of kingdoms ruled by Chandravamsha Kshatriya kings in central and western India. The Vishnu Purana links its outlying tribes to the Yadu tribe. According to the Puranas, the Haihaya were divided into the Talajanghas, Vitihotras, Avantis, Tundikeras and Jatas. Haihaya rulers included the legendary Kartavirya Arjuna, a powerful king who defeated Ravana. Although he had a thousand arms, he was felled and his arms severed by Parasurama. The Haihaya capital was Mahishmati, on the banks of the Narmada River in Madhya Pradesh.

==== Kalachuri ====
Kalachuri is the name used by two kingdoms who claim a common ancestry and ruled in a succession of dynasties from the 10th to the 12th centuries. The first kingdom controlled western Madhya Pradesh and Rajasthan in central India. The second, the southern Kalachuri, ruled part of Karnataka. Kalachuri kings, related by marriage to the Chalukyas and Rashtrakutas, and ruled from Tripuri, Gorakhpur, Ratnapur and Rajpur.

The name Kalachuri may derive from kali (long moustache) and churi (sharp knife). The Kalachuri were also known as Katachuris.

In the Telugu epic The Battle of Palnadu, the Kalachuri are referred to as the Haihaya family of the Kona region (Amalapuram), the Razole Taluqs of the present-day East Godavari district, and the Haihaya family of Palanadu. They were vassals of the Chalukyas.

The Pericchedis are also mentioned as vassals of the Chalukyas. According to V. Rama Chandra Rao, they were connected to the ancient Chedi. The Pericchedis had two branches, with Kollipaka and Bezawada their capitals. Rao also mentions that the Vatsavai dynasty of Peddapuram may be related to the Matsya dynasty, since there is evidence of a branch in the Visakhapatnam area.

An 1174 record suggests the Kalachuri dynasty was thought to be founded by Soma, who grew a beard and moustache to save himself from Parashurama's wrath. Their emblem was suvarna vrishabha, a golden bull. The Kalachuri honoured Krantivirya Sahasrarjun, who killed Rishi Jamdagni (Bhagwan Parshurama's father). Historians such as P. B. Desai emphasize the Kalachuris' central-Indian origin.

At their zenith, the Kalachuris ruled parts of Gujarat, Malwa, Konkan and Maharashtra. Their rule was ended by the Badami Chalukyas under Badami Chalukya Magalesa. Lieutenant colonel James Tod recorded a tribe of Haihayas "near the very top of the valley of Sohagpur in Bagelkhand, aware of their ancient lineage, and though few in number, still celebrated for their valour".

=== Eastern Chalukyas ===
Between 624 and 1323, the Telugu language emerged as a literary medium alongside Prakrit and Sanskrit. From around 848 (during the time of Gunaga Vijayaditya) to the 11th century, the language progressed from stanzas to full literary works. At this time, it was written in old Telugu script; Al-Beruni referred to the script as "Andhri" in his 1000 Kitab Al-Hind. During the 11th century, the Mahabharata was partially translated by court poet Nannaya under the patronage of the Eastern Chalukya ruler Rajaraja Narendra. Modern Telugu script evolved from the old Telugu script from the 11th to the 19th centuries.

The Eastern Chalukyas were a branch of the Chalukyas of Badami. Pulakesin II conquered Vengi (near Eluru) in 624 and installed his brother, Kubja Vishnuvardhana (624–641), as its ruler. The Vishnuvardhana dynasty, known as the Eastern Chalukyas, ruled for nearly four centuries. Vishnuvardhana's domain extended from Srikakulam in the north to Nellore in the south.

Control of the Vengi region shifted from Gunaga Vijayaditya to Rashtrakuta rule, to the Kalyani Chalukya and then to the Cholas. In 1118, Kulottunga Chola was defeated by Vikramaditya VI of the Kalyani Chalukya dynasty. The Cholas at Talakad were defeated by the Hoysala ruler, Vishnuvardhana, and Vengi was again ruled by the Chalukyas. Later Vikrama Chola recaptured Vengi from Kalyani Chalukyas and it remained under Cholas till early thirteenth century. After the death of Kulottunga Chola III, Vengi went into the hands of Kakatiyas.

=== Chola Empire ===
The ancient Chola kingdom mentioned in the writings of Greek merchants and geographers faded into darkness after c. 300 CE. Cholas during this period almost completely disappeared from their native land, though a branch of them can be traced towards the close of the 6th century in Rayalaseema—the Telugu-Cholas, whose kingdom is mentioned by Xuanzang in the seventh century CE. Due to Kalabhra invasion and growing power of Pallavas, Cholas migrated from their native to Telugu country and ruled from there as chieftains of Pallavas at least since 470 CE. Several Telugu Chola families like Renati Cholas, Pottapi Cholas, Nellore Cholas, Velanati Cholas, Nannuru Cholas existed and claimed descent from ancient Tamil Chola king Karikala Chola. The Cholas had to wait for another three centuries until the accession of Vijayalaya Chola belonging to Pottapi Chola family in the second quarter of the ninth century to re-establish their dynasty as independent rulers by overthrowing Pallavas and Pandyas. According to Anbil plates of Parantaka Chola II, Vijayalaya Chola's predecessor is Srikantha Choladhiraja, a Telugu Pottapi Chola king. Vijayalaya Chola captured Tanjore from Pandyas and his descendants started ruling from there. Under Raja Raja Chola I and Rajendra Chola I, the empire expanded occupying south India, Sri Lanka, Maldives, Malaysia and Indonesia. These Imperial Cholas had marital alliances with Vengi Chalukyas. Kulottunga Chola I, the grandson of Rajendra Chola I and son of Eastern Chalukya king Raja Raja Narendra became the Chola emperor in 1270 CE. Contemporarily several Telugu Chola families like Nellore Cholas, Velanati Cholas were ruling as subordinates of Imperial Cholas. After the fall of Imperial Cholas in 1279 CE, Nellore Cholas and Velanati Cholas became subordinates of Kakatiyas. Kakatiyas also claim descent from Karikala Chola.

== Late Medieval and Early Modern period (12th - 18th centuries CE) ==
=== Kakatiya dynasty ===
Timeline
12th - 18th centuries CE
1323	The Delhi Sultanate besieges and annexes Warangal, resulting in the end of the Kakatiya dynasty.
1326	Musunuri Nayaks reclaim Telugu lands from the Delhi Sulatante.
1518	The Bahmani Sultanate disintegrates, and the Golconda Sultanate is established by Quli Qutb-ul-Mulk.
1687	Mughal Invasion and end of the Golconda Sultanate
_{1724}	_{The region is conquered by Nizam-ul-Mulk.}

The Kakatiya dynasty rose to power during the 12th and 13th centuries. Initially vassals of the Western Chalukyas of Kalyani, they held a small territory near Warangal. Prola II of the Kakatiyas (1110–1158) extended his territory southwards and declared his independence, with Hanumakonda as the capital. His successor, Prataparudra I (1158–1195), increased the holdings eastward to the Godavari delta. Prataparudra built Warangal as a second capital, and countered invasions by the Seuna Yadavas of Devagiri.

The next ruler, Mahadeva, extended the Kakatiyas kingdom to the coast before he was succeeded by Ganapati Deva in 1199. Ganapati Deva was the first ruler since the Satavahana dynasty to unite the Telugu lands. In 1210, Ganapati Deva defeated the Velanati Chodas and extended his empire north to Anakapalle.

Rani Rudrama Devi (died 1289 or 1295), who defended the Kakatiya kingdom against the Cholas and the Seuna Yadavas, is one of the few queens in Indian history. She was succeeded by her grandson, Prataparudra. Although his reign was characterized by battles against internal and external foes, Prataparudra expanded his kingdom west to Raichur and south to Ongole and the Nallamala Hills, all the way to Kanchipuram. He introduced a number of administrative reforms, some of which were adopted in the Vijayanagar empire. Muslim attacks began in 1310, and in 1323 the Kakatiya dynasty fell to the Delhi Sultanate.

=== Reddy Kingdom ===
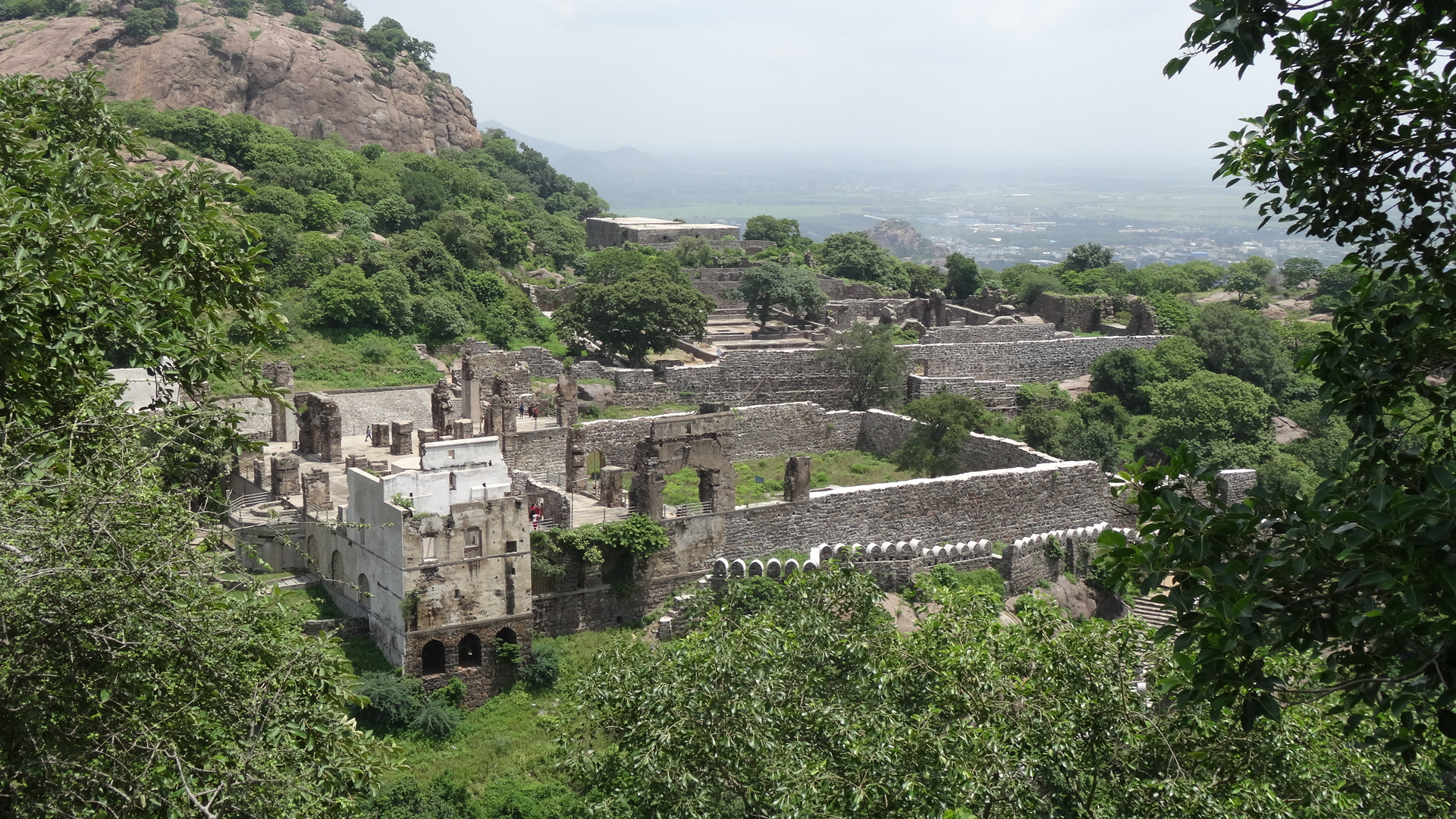
Kondapalli Fort, constructed in 1325 by the Prolaya Vema Reddy

After the death of Pratapa Rudra II and the subsequent fall of the Kakatiya Empire, Prolaya Vema Reddi made a confederacy to expel the Delhi Sultanate from Telugu areas. Prolaya Vema Reddy established the Reddy kingdom. The Reddys ruled from present-day Srikakulam in the north to Kanchi in the south, most of the present-day Andhra and Rayalaseema regions. In his 1909 book, Castes and Tribes of Southern India, Edgar Thurston described the Reddys as village chiefs and listed them as Kapu.

The Reddy Kingdom (1326–1448) ruled portions of coastal Andhra Pradesh for over a century. Prolaya Vema Reddy, was the first king of the Reddy dynasty. The capital of the kingdom was Addanki. It was moved to Kondavidu and then later to Rajahmundry. His reign was characterised by the restoration of peace, patronage of the arts and literature and broad development. Errana, the translator of the Mahabharata, lived during this period.

=== Musunuri Nayaks ===
The Musunuri Nayaks reclaimed the Telugu lands from the Delhi Sultanate and ruled them for fifty years. Hakka (Harihara) and Bukka, treasury officers at the court of Prataparudra, were inspired by the Musunuri Nayaks to organise Hindu opposition to Muslim invaders.

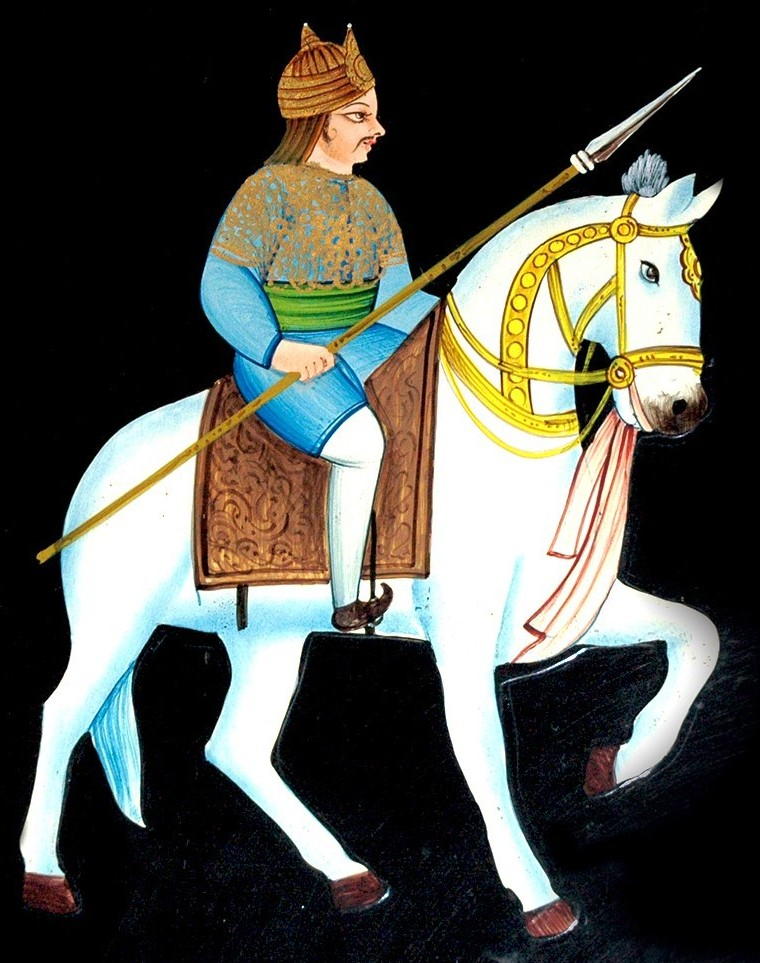
Kaapaneedu

Prataparudra was captured by the Muslims. Two Telugus, Annaya Mantri and Kolani Rudradeva, united the Nayaks against the invaders. Musunuri Prolaya Nayaka of the Musunuri Nayaks was chosen as their leader. By 1326, Prolaneedu had liberated Warangal. Inspired by the victories of Prolaneedu and his cousin, Kaapaneedu, other states (including Kampili, Hoysala, Dwarasamudram and Araveedu) asserted their independence.

Ulugh Khan captured Harihara and Bukka at Warangal. Converted to Islam, they were sent by the sultan to suppress the Hoysala ruler's rebellion. Instead, the brothers established the Vijayanagara Empire. The Sultan led a large army south, but was halted by an epidemic and Nayak resistance. Kaapaneedu, with the assistance of the Hoysala, liberated Andhra Pradesh.

In 1345 Muslim nobles rebelled against Muhammad bin Tughluq in Devagiri, resulting in the foundation of the Bahmani Sultanate by Hasan Gangu. He assumed the name Alauddin Bahman Shah, and moved his capital to Gulbarga in 1347. With raids and coercion, Singama of the Recherla Nayaks destabilised Alauddin's rule. Kapaya Nayaka forged a treaty with Alauddin and surrendered Kaulas Fort. In 1351, Muhammad bin Tughluq died. Eight years later, Alauddin died and was succeeded by Mohammed Shah. Kapaya Nayaka then sent his son, Vinayaka Deva, to liberate Kaulas Fort and Bhuvanagiri from the Bahmanis; Vijayanagar emperor Bukka Raya assisted Deva in the campaign. Deva initially succeeded, but was eventually defeated, captured and killed.

Kapaya Nayaka persisted, capturing Golconda and Warangal. In 1365, Golconda was chosen as the border between the Bahmani and Warangal kingdoms. Kapaya Nayaka was forced to pay reparations, including a turquoise throne, to Mohammed Shah. In 1370 Anapota Nayaka of the Recherla Nayaks marched against Warangal as part of a Bahmani invasion, and Kapaya Nayaka died in the ensuing battle at Bhimavaram. With Kapaya Nayaka gone, the Bahmanis soon subjugated their allies and ruled Andhra.

=== Vijayanagara Empire ===
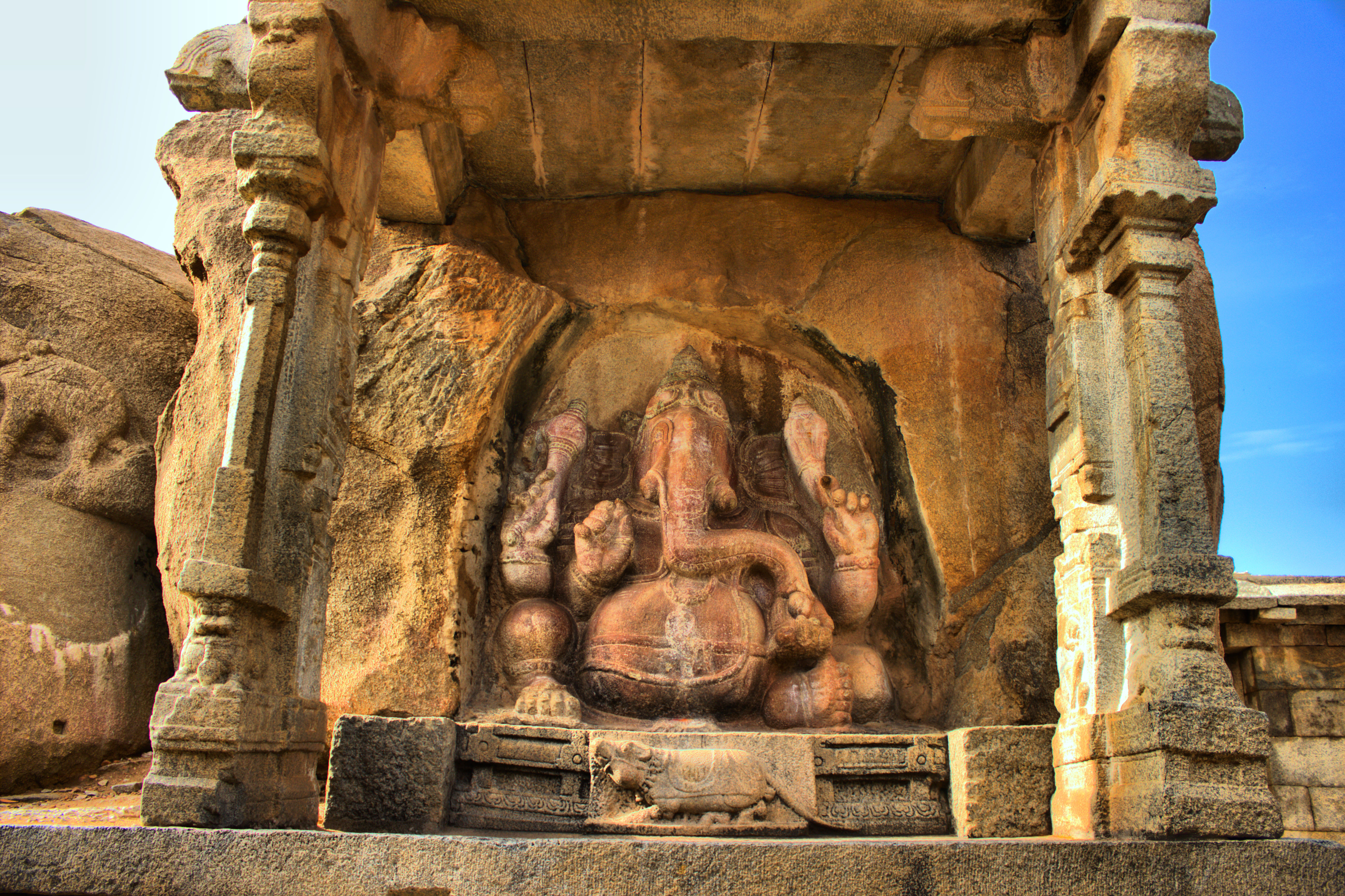
Sculpture of Ganesha at the Veerabhadra Temple at Lepakshi, built during the reign of the Vijayanagara Empire.

The Vijayanagara Empire was founded by Harihara (Hakka) and Bukka, who were treasury officers in the administration of the Kakatiya dynasty or commanders of Hoysala's forces. When Warangal fell in 1323 the brothers were captured, taken to Delhi and converted to Islam. The Delhi Sultanate sent them to the Deccan as governors of Kampili in the hope that they could deal with the local revolt and invasions by neighboring Hindu kings. Their first campaign was against neighboring Hoysala emperor Veera Ballala III of Dwarasamudra. The brothers later reconverted to Hinduism under the influence of the sage Vidyaranya, and proclaimed independence from the Delhi Sultanate. Some, however, claim that the founders of the empire were Kannadigas stationed in the Tungabhadra region under Veera Ballala III to fight off Muslim invaders.

Harihara I (r. 1336–1356) established his new capital, Vijayanagar, in an easily defended position south of the Tungabhadra River. The empire reached its zenith under Krishnadevaraya in the early 16th century, and Telugu literature developed at this time. Vijayanagar monuments were built across South India, and in Lepakshi, Tirupati and Sri Kalahasti in Andhra Pradesh. The largest and best-known collection of such monuments is at Hampi in present-day Karnataka.

=== Bahmani and Golconda Sultanates ===
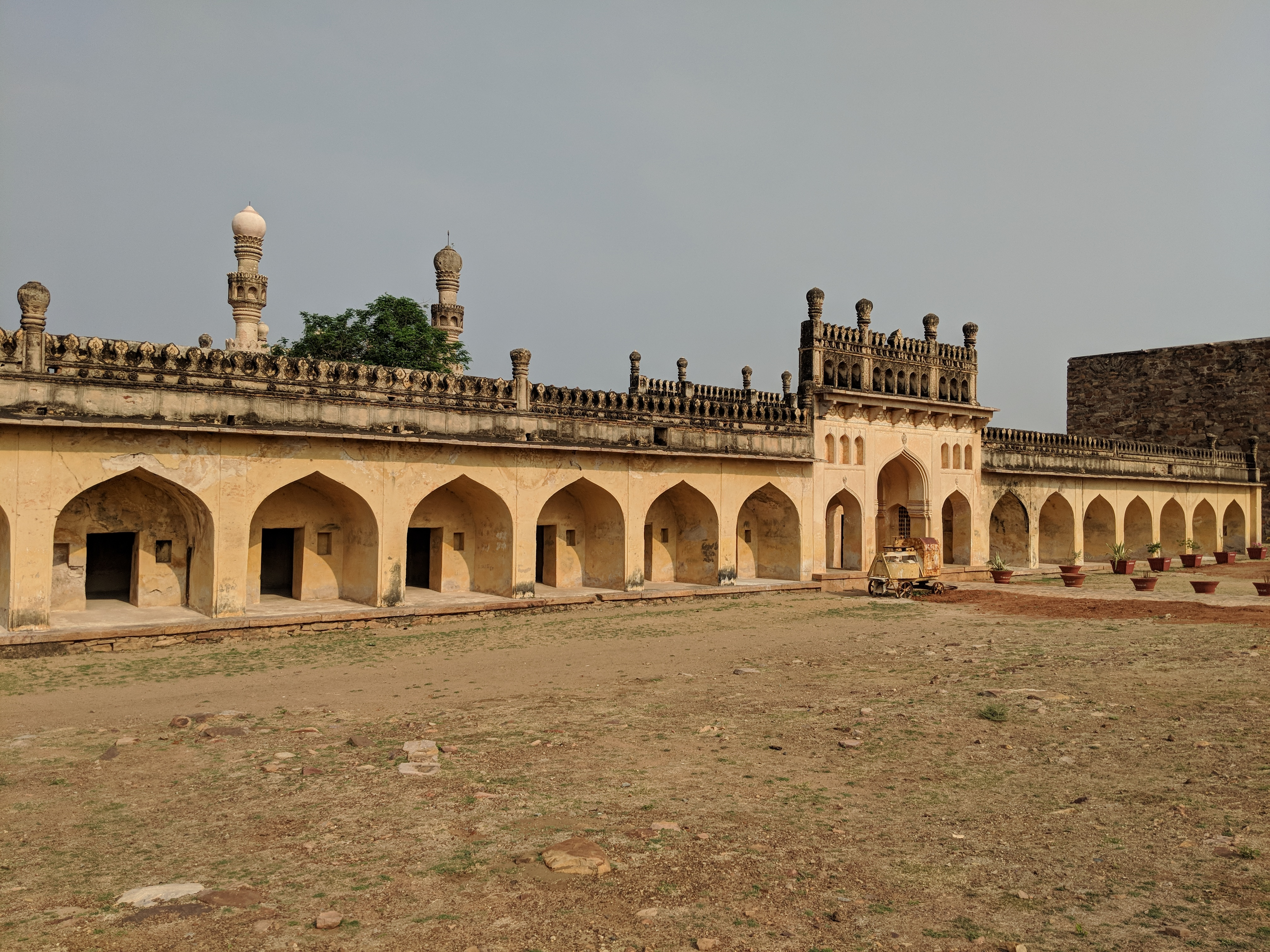
The mosque at Gandikota Fort was built by the Golconda Sultanate.

In 1323, Delhi sultan Ghiaz-ud-din Tughlaq sent a large army under his son Ulugh Khan (Muhammad bin Tughlaq) to conquer the Telugu country and lay siege to Warangal, which was soon annexed and governed as "Tiling", a provinces of the Deccan. Their rule in Andhra lasted until the 1330s, when 72 nayaka chieftains from Andhra and Telangana rebelled and drove governor Malik Maqbul Tilangani out of Warangal. In 1347, after a revolt against the Delhi Sultanate, an independent Muslim state, the Bahmani Sultanate, was established in South India by Ala-ud-Din Bahman Shah whose successors gradually occupied the Andhra regions by 1471. By the end of the 15th century, the sultanate was plagued with factional strife. Five Shahi sultanates were founded, and the Qutb Shahi dynasty played a major role in the history of the Telugu country. The founder of the dynasty was Quli Qutb Mulk, a Shia Turkmen from Hamadan in Persia. He first migrated to Delhi and then to the Deccan to serve under the Bahmani Sultanate, where he earned the title Qutb-ul-Mulk. Later, when the Bahmani Sultanate declined and was divided into five Deccan sultanates, he gained control over the south-eastern region and founded a sovereign kingdom. He adopted the title of Qutb Shah and his dynasty became known as the Qutb Shahi dynasty.

Qutb Shah occupied the region of Vengi between the Krishna River and the Godavari River after the death of Prataparudra Deva, the Gajapati monarch who ruled the region. However, the advance of Quli Qutb Shah was stopped at the banks of the Godavari by the regional Gajapati Empire feudatory Vishwanath Dev Gajapati and a treaty was signed marking the river as the boundary between the two kingdoms. The treaty was engraved on a copper plate, now in the Nizam Museum. However, with the decline of the Gajapatis, Ibrahim Quli Qutb Shah later rescinded the terms of the treaty and invaded Kalinga in 1571 after the death of Vishwanath Dev, and defeated his son the new king, Maharaja Balaram Dev, enforcing a tributary status upon the Nandapur Kingdom. The military conquests of Qutb Shahi Sultans led to the annexation of regions of southern Kalinga into their kingdom and the Sultanate prospered. The rule of the Jeypore Kings over coastal Andhra came to an end when their feudatories of the region claimed independence in the rebellion of Balaram Dev III against his brother the king, Maharaja Ram Chandra Dev I, in 1711. Some of those notable feudatories of Jeypore were - Kurupam, Chemudu, Madugula, Pachipenta, Araku, etc. However, coastal Andhra later became a part of the Nizamate of Hyderabad until the arrival of the British.

=== Mughal conquest ===
In 1687, Aurangazeb invaded and annexed Golconda and appointed a Nizam (governor). The Mughal Nizams controlled Andhra for about 35 years. In 1707 Aurangazeb died, and the Mughal regime weakened and lost control of the provinces. This enabled the British East India Company and the French Compagnie des Indes Orientales to consolidate power in India.

== Colonial era (1753-1947 CE) ==
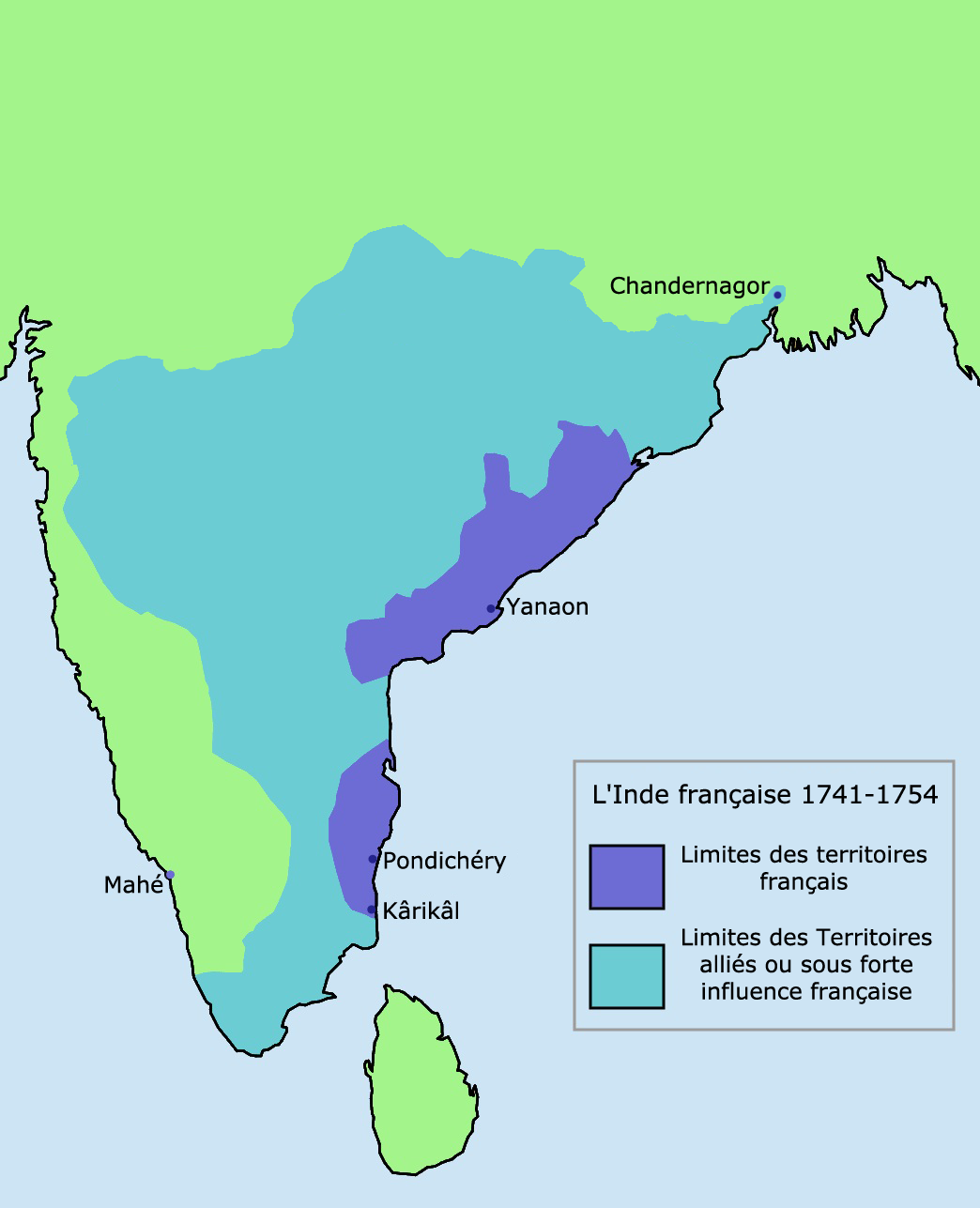
Maximum extent of French influence (1741–1754)

Following the defeat of the Vijayanagara Empire, the Qutb Shahi dynasty held sway over the present day Andhra Pradesh and Telangana. Later, this region came under the rule of the Mughal Empire. In 1611, an English trading post by the name of British East India Company was established in Machilipatnam on India's east coast. Nizam of Hyderabad who was initially appointed as viceroy of Deccan by the Mughal in 1713, established himself as a semi independent ruler.

In a 1753 decree, Deccan subedar Asif ad-Dawlah Mir Ali Salabat Jang ceded Chicacole, Ellore and Rajahmundry to the Marquis de Bussy-Castelnau. An annual stipend of 200,000 rupees was paid to maintain French troops in the subah; revenue in the Northern Circars amounted to one million rupees a year. Bussy had helped Salabat Jang become subedar of the Deccan. The agreement between the French and Salabat Jang in Aurangabad bears the signature of Said Loukshur, Salabat Jang's minister. Yanam was an important town during the French occupation of the Northern Circars.

In 1758, the French and English fought at Chandurthi in present-day Gollaprolu mandal of East Godavari district. The French were defeated by the British and Salabat Jang made a treaty with the British, giving them the Northern Circars in a firman.

The Nizam later rebelled against the English. The war ended with a second treaty; the Northern Circars remained under the control of British India, and after 1760 the French lost their hold there and throughout South India.

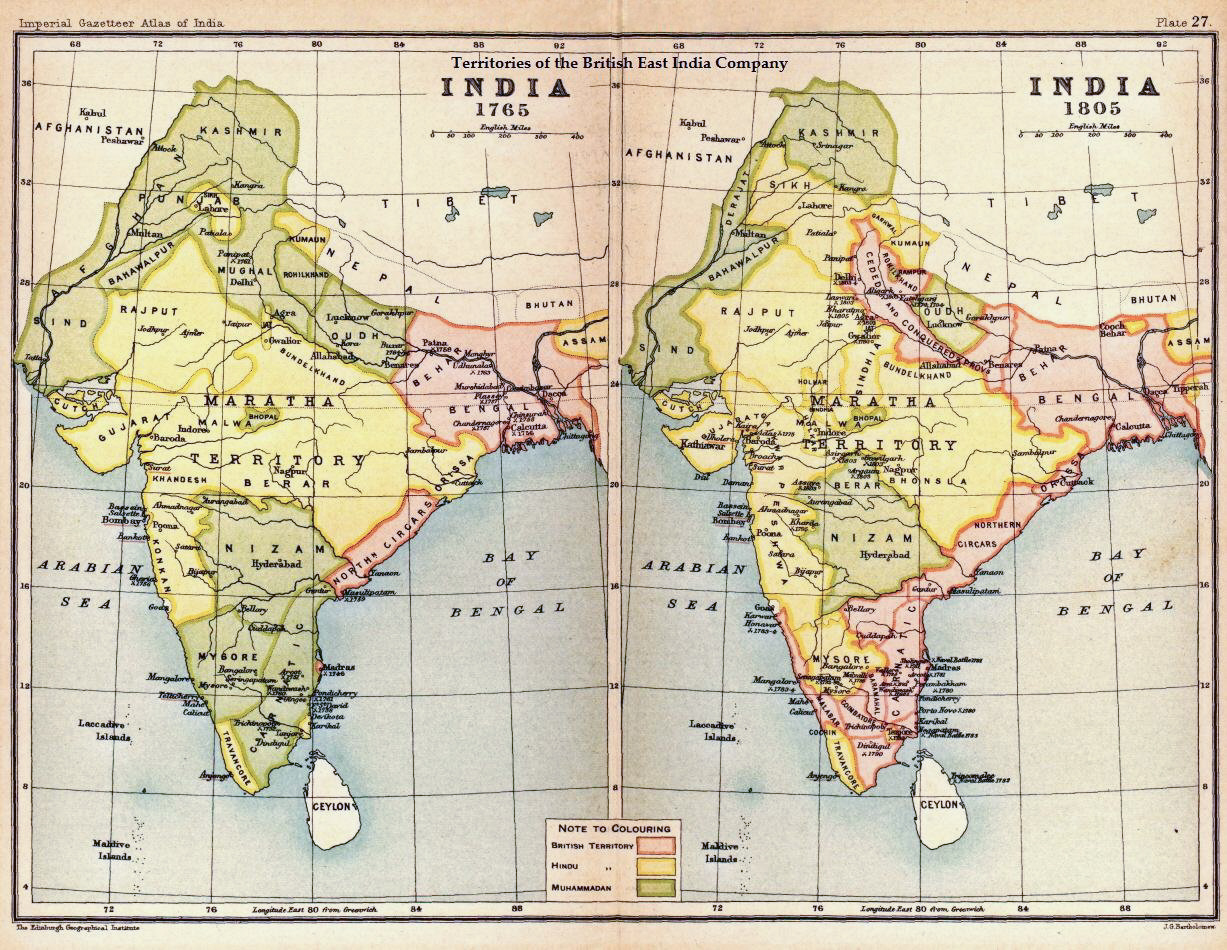
Parts of Andhra Pradesh in 1765 (left) ruled by Nizam, Carnatic sultanate, British East India Company and Kingdom of Mysore and transformation to British East India Company rule by 1801 (map dated 1805) (right)

In 1765, British Lord Robert Clive obtained from the Mughal emperor Shah Alam II a grant of four circars to the British East India Company, that was formalised in a 1778 treaty with Nizam Ali with addition of another circar. Later, four territories were ceded to the British by the Nizam Ali in 1800, which eventually became the Rayalaseema region. The local chieftains, known as Polygars, revolted against the company's rule, which was suppressed by the company.

Meanwhile, in the present day North Andhra, Raja Viziaram Raz (Vijayaram Raj) established a sovereign kingdom by claiming independence from the Kingdom of Jeypore in 1711. It formed alliances with the French and British East India companies to conquer the neighbouring principalities of Bobbili, Kurupam, Paralakhemundi, and the kingdom of Jeypore. It fell out with the British and, as a result, was attacked and defeated in the battle of Padmanabham in 1794. It was annexed as a tributary estate like other principalities and remained so until its accession to the Indian Union in 1949. Following the annexation of Carnatic sultanate in 1801, the last major piece of the present day Andhra Pradesh came under British East India company rule as part of Madras Presidency.

The Nizams retained control of the interior provinces as a princely state, acknowledging British rule in return for local autonomy. The provinces were governed in a feudal manner, with zamindars in areas such as Kulla and elsewhere in the Godavari acting as lords under the Nizam. The zamindari system was dismantled after independence.

=== Madras Presidency ===
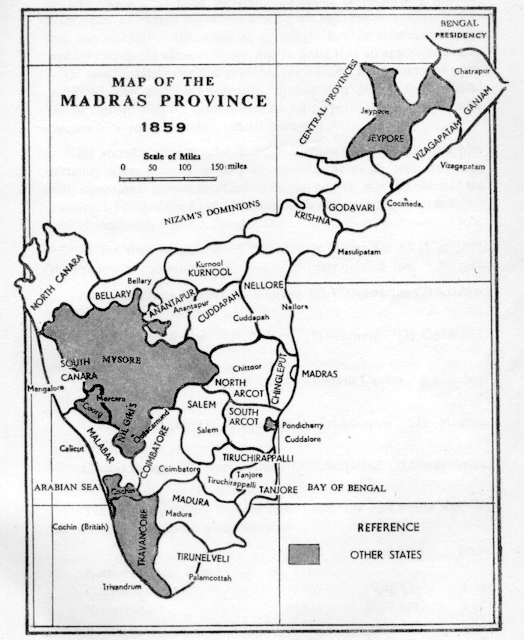
Madras Presidency in 1859; North Canara (Uttara Kannada) was transferred to the Bombay Presidency in 1862.

After the Indian rebellion of 1857, the region became part of British crown till India became independent in 1947. The No Tax campaign in Chirala and Perala in 1919, the Rampa revolt in 1922 are some of the protests against British rule.

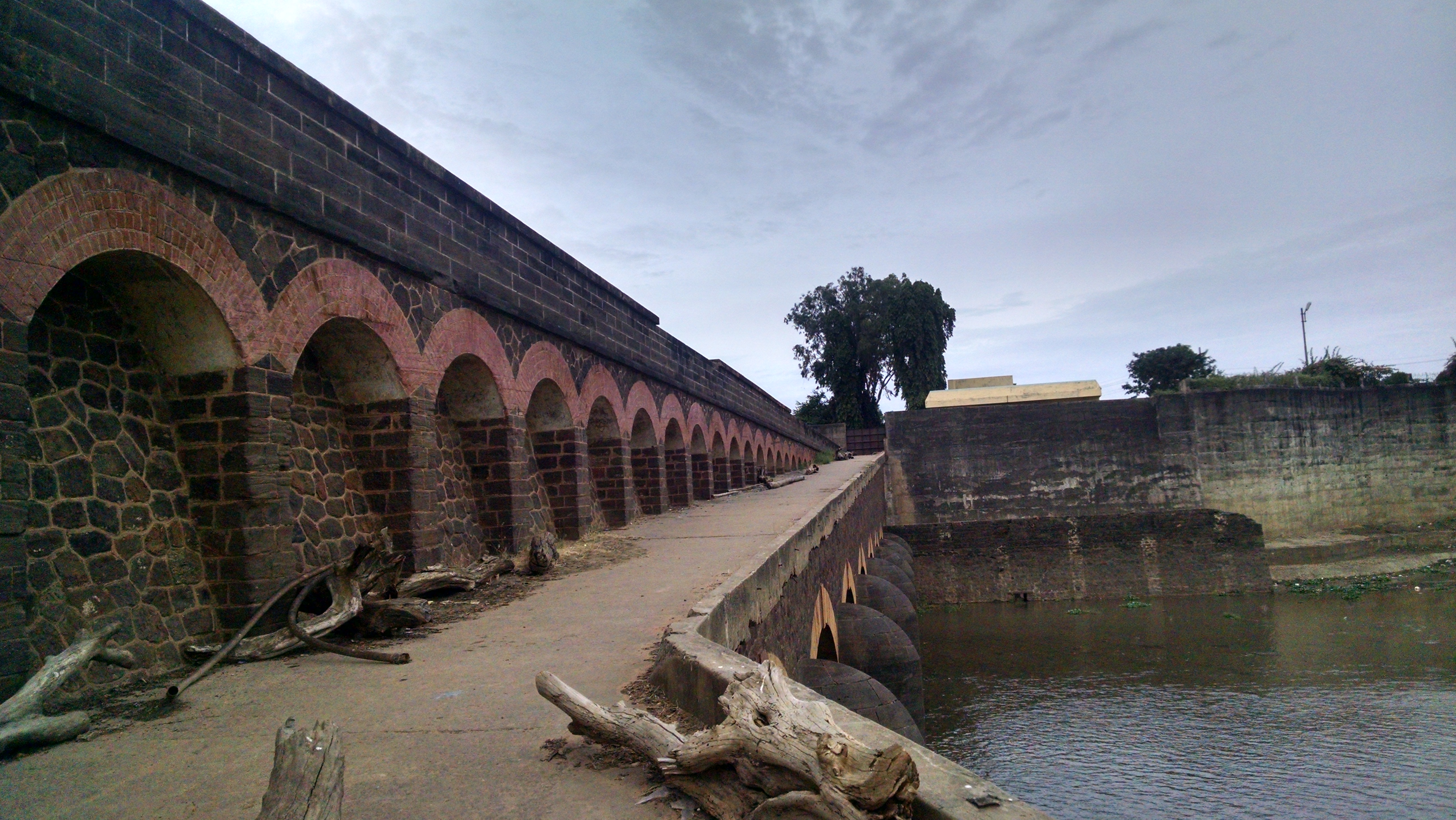
Dowleswaram Barrage built in 1850 by Arthur Cotton

Anicut at Dowleswaram built in 1850 by Arthur Cotton and several others at Vijayawada, Nellore, Sangam, Sunkesula, Polampalli are examples of irrigation facilities built during the British raj, that irrigated lacs of acres across coastal districts. Charles Philip Brown did pioneering work in transforming Telugu to the print era and introduced Vemana poems to English readers. Kandukuri Veeresalingam is considered the father of the Telugu renaissance movement, as he encouraged the education of women and lower caste people. He fought against Brahmin marriage customs such as child marriage, the bride price system, and prohibition of widow remarriage.

==== Telugu districts ====
- Vizagapatam (later Srikakulam, Vizianagaram and Visakhapatnam districts)
- Godavari (later East Godavari district)
- Machilipatnam (later Guntur, Krishna and West Godavari Districts)
- Kurnool
- Nellore
- Cuddapah
- Anantapur
- Prakasam

==== Zamindaris ====
- Vasireddy clan
- Vizianagaram estate
- Vizagapatam
- Bobbili Estate
- Devarapu clan
- Nuzvid Estate
- Ravella clan

==== Padmanayaka Zamindari ====
- Kirlampudi
- Annavaram
- Nuzividu
- Mylavaram
- Gurazala
- Shri Kalahasti
- Venkatagiri
- Pithapuram

== Post-Independence (1947 CE - present) ==
Timeline
1947 CE - present
1947	India becomes independent
1953	Andhra State is created by separating Telugu-speaking regions of the Madras State.
1956	According to the States Reorganization Act, the Telugu-speaking regions of Hyderabad State and the Andhra State were merged to create Andhra Pradesh (United).
2014	Andhra Pradesh (United) is bifurcated into Telangana and Andhra Pradesh.

In 1947, India gained independence from the United Kingdom. Although the Muslim Nizam of Hyderabad resisted, he was forced to cede his state to India in 1948 to form Hyderabad State. When India became independent, Telugu-speaking people (Urdu is spoken in some parts of Hyderabad and a few other districts of Hyderabad State) were distributed in 22 districts: nine in Hyderabad State, 12 in the Madras Presidency and one in French-controlled Yanam. In 1953 Andhra State was created from part of the Madras Presidency, the first state in India formed on a linguistic basis. In 1956, Andhra State was merged with the Telugu-speaking area of Hyderabad State to form the state of Andhra Pradesh.

=== Madras Manade movement ===
Madras possessed Tamil and Telugu cultures. In the early 1920s, Madras Presidency Chief Minister Panagal Raja said that the Cooum River should be the boundary between the Andhra and Tamil regions. In 1953 Telugu speakers in the former Madras Presidency sought to make Madras the capital of Andhra Pradesh, adopting the slogan Madras manade ("Madras is ours"). However the city of Madras had a population consisting of 65% Tamil speakers as opposed to 27% Telugu speakers at that time, therefore Madras stayed with the Tamil state.

=== Creation of Andhra State ===
Activist Potti Sriramulu advocated inclusion of the Telugu-speaking areas of Rayalaseema and Coastal Andhra in an Andhra state. He conducted a hunger strike until Prime Minister Jawaharlal Nehru promised to form an Andhra state. On 19 October 1952, when Nehru's promise had not been fulfilled, Sriramulu began fasting again at Maharshi Bulusu Sambamurthy's Madras home. The Andhra Congress committee disapproved of Sriramulu's hunger strike, but his action became widely known. He died shortly after midnight on 15 December 1952 at 126 Royapettah High Road, Mylapore, Madras, and the house has been preserved.

During Sriramulu's funeral procession, mourners praised his sacrifice. When the procession reached Mount Road, thousands of people joined it and raised banners hailing Sriramulu. Later, they began destroying public property. The news spread quickly, and seven people were killed by police gunfire in Anakapalle and Vijayawada. The unrest continued for several days.

On 19 December 1952, Prime Minister Nehru announced the formation of a separate state for the Telugu-speaking people of the Madras Presidency. As of 1 October 1953, the State of Andhra was formally established under the Andhra State Act, 1953, comprising eleven districts partitioned from Madras State, with Kurnool designated as the seat of government. Andhra Kesari Tanguturi Prakasam Pantulu became chief minister of the new Telugu state.

=== Merger of Hyderabad and Andhra States ===
Map of India, with the Telangana region highlighted in red

In December 1953, the States Reorganisation Commission convened to create states on linguistic lines. Due to public demand, the commission recommended abolishing Hyderabad State and merging its Marathi-speaking region into Bombay State and its Kannada-speaking region into Mysore State.

The States Reorganisation Commission (SRC) discussed a merger of the Telugu-speaking Telangana region of Hyderabad State and Andhra State. According to Paragraph 374 of the report, "The creation of Vishalandhra is an ideal to which numerous individuals and public bodies, both in Andhra and Telangana, have been passionately attached over a long period of time, and unless there are strong reasons to the contrary, this sentiment is entitled to consideration". About Telangana, paragraph 378 reads: "One of the principal causes of opposition of Vishalandhra also seems to be the apprehension felt by the educationally backward people of Telangana that they may be swamped and exploited by the more advanced people of the coastal areas". In its analysis, the SRC opposed an immediate merger. Paragraph 386 reads, "After taking all these factors into consideration we have come to the conclusion that it will be in the interests of Andhra as well as Telangana, if for the present, the Telangana area is to constitute into a separate State, which may be known as the Hyderabad State with provision for its unification with Andhra after the general elections likely to be held in or about 1961 if by a two thirds majority the legislature of the residuary Hyderabad State expresses itself in favor of such unification". The central government, led by Nehru, merged Andhra State and Telangana to form Andhra Pradesh on 1 November 1956 after ensuring safeguards to Telangana in the form of a gentleman's agreement.

==== History of United Andhra Pradesh ====
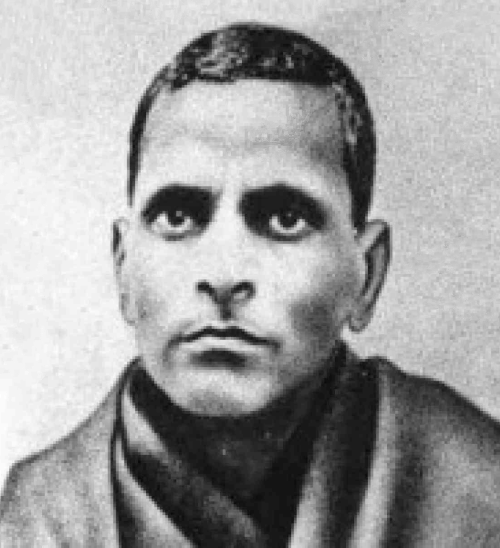
Potti Sreeramulu, whose fast unto death in 1952 led to the formation of Andhra State

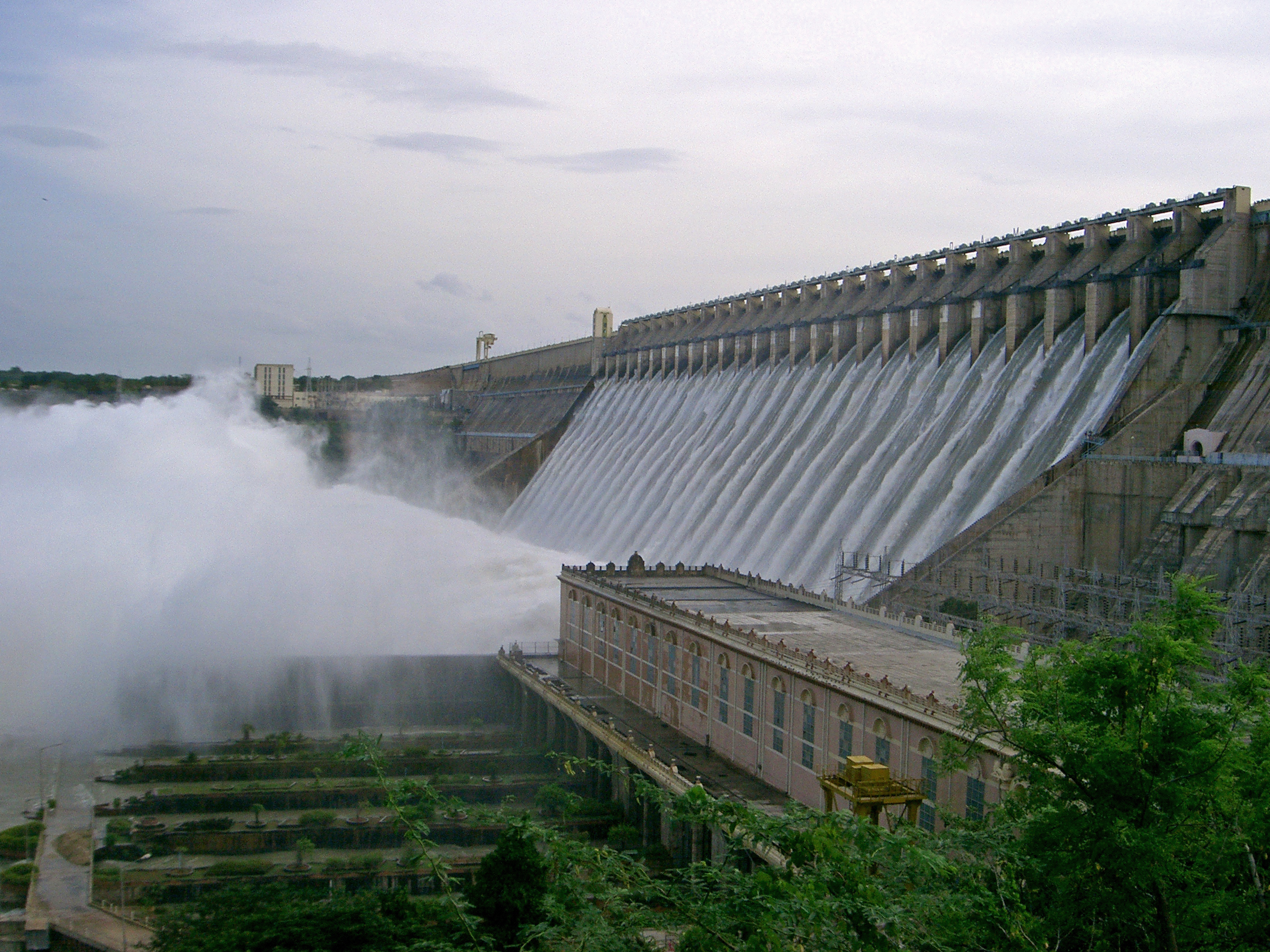
Nagarjuna Sagar Dam (completed in 1967)

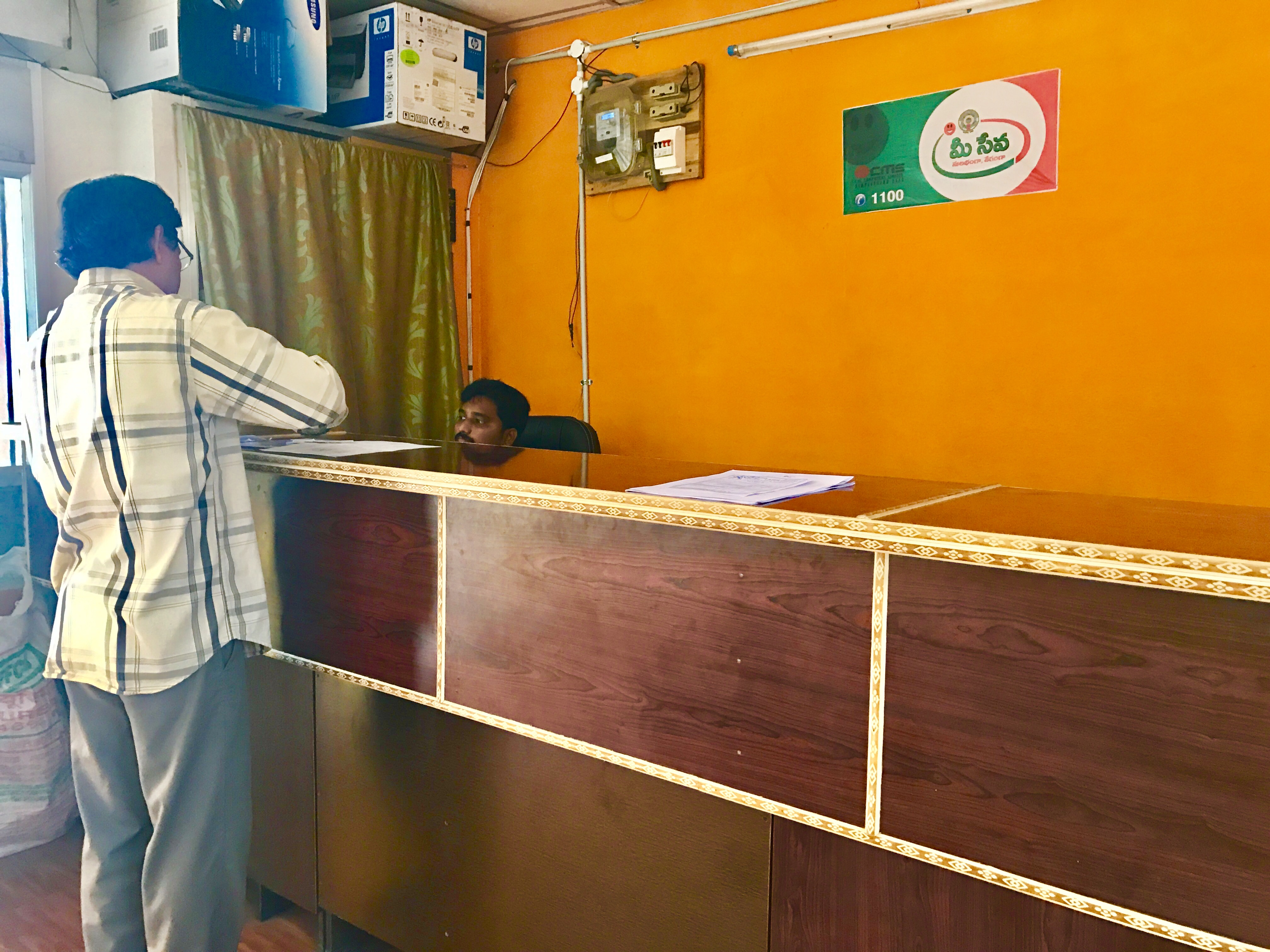
Mee Seva office (initial launch of the E-Seva Project in 2001)

In an effort to gain an independent state based on linguistic identity and to protect the interests of the Telugu-speaking people of Madras State, Potti Sreeramulu fasted to death in 1952. As the city of Madras became a bone of contention, in 1949 a committee with Jawaharlal Nehru, Vallabhbhai Patel, and Pattabhi Sitaramayya was constituted. The committee recommended that Andhra State could be formed provided the Andhras gave up their claim on the city of Madras (now Chennai). After Potti Sreeramulu's death, the Telugu-speaking area of Andhra State was carved out of Madras State on 1 October 1953, with Kurnool as its capital city. Tanguturi Prakasam became the first chief minister. On the basis of the Gentlemen's Agreement of 1956, the States Reorganisation Act created Andhra Pradesh by merging the neighbouring Telugu-speaking areas of the Hyderabad State with Hyderabad as the capital on 1 November 1956. Hyderabad grew rapidly partly through investments flowing in from agrarian change and 'green revolution' in coastal Andhra.

The Indian National Congress (INC) ruled the state from 1956 to 1982. Neelam Sanjiva Reddy became the first chief minister. Among other chief ministers, P. V. Narasimha Rao is known for implementing land reforms and land ceiling acts and securing reservation for lower castes in politics. Nagarjuna Sagar Dam, completed in 1967, and Srisailam Dam, completed in 1981, are some of the irrigation projects that helped increase the production of paddy in the state.

In 1983, the Telugu Desam Party (TDP) won the state elections, and N. T. Rama Rao became the chief minister of the state for the first time after launching his party just nine months earlier. This broke the long-time single-party monopoly enjoyed by the INC. He transformed the sub-district administration by forming mandals in place of earlier taluks, removing hereditary village heads, and appointing non-hereditary village revenue assistants. The 1989 elections ended the rule of Rao, with the INC returning to power with Marri Chenna Reddy at the helm. In 1994, Andhra Pradesh gave a mandate to the Telugu Desam Party again, and Rao became the chief minister again. Nara Chandrababu Naidu, Rao's son-in-law, came to power in 1995 with the backing of a majority of the MLAs. The Telugu Desam Party won both the assembly and Lok Sabha elections in 1999 under the leadership of Chandrababu Naidu. Thus, Naidu held the record for the longest-serving chief minister (1995–2004) of the united Andhra Pradesh. He introduced e-governance by launching e-Seva centres in 2001 for paperless and speedy delivery of government services. He is credited with transforming Hyderabad into an IT hub by providing incentives for tech companies to set up centres.

In 2004, Congress returned to power with a new chief ministerial face, YS Rajashekara Reddy, better known as YSR. The main emphasis during Reddy's tenure was on social welfare schemes such as free electricity for farmers, health insurance, tuition fee reimbursement for the poor, and the national rural employment guarantee scheme. He took over the free emergency ambulance service initiated by a corporation and ran it as a government project. INC won the 2009 elections under the leadership of YSR in April. He was elected chief minister again but was killed in a helicopter crash that occurred in September 2009. He was succeeded by Congressmen Konijeti Rosaiah and Nallari Kiran Kumar Reddy; the latter resigned over the impending division of the state to form Telangana.

During its 58 years as a unified state, the state weathered separatist movements from Telangana (1969) and Andhra (1972) successfully. A new party called Telangana Rashtra Samithi, formed in April 2001 by Kalvakuntla Chandrashekar Rao (KCR), reignited the Telanganga movement. A joint action committee formed with political parties, government employees, and the general public spearheaded the agitation. When KCR's health deteriorated due to his fast-unto-death programme, the central government decided to initiate the process to form an independent Telangana in December 2009. This triggered the Samaikyandhra movement to keep the state united. The Srikrishna committee was formed to give recommendations on how to deal with the situation. It gave its report in December 2010. The agitations continued for nearly 5 years, with the Telangana side harping on the marginalisation of food culture, language, and unequal economic development and the Samaikyandhra movement focusing on the shared culture, language, customs, and historical unity of Telugu-speaking regions.

==== Bifurcation of Andhra Pradesh ====
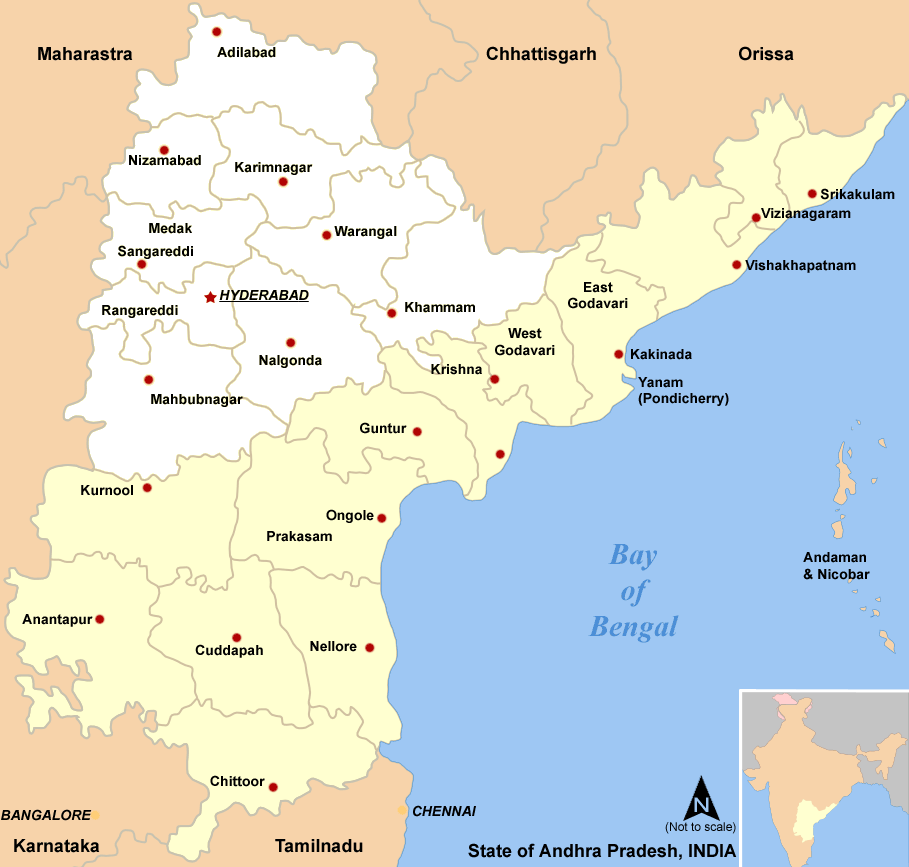
Telangana (in white) and Andhra Pradesh (in yellow) after bifurcation

On 30 July 2013, the Congress Working Committee unanimously approved a resolution recommending the formation of a Telangana state. In February 2014, a bill was placed before Parliament The Andhra Pradesh Reorganisation Act, 2014 was passed, allowing the formation of a Telangana state of ten districts from north-western Andhra Pradesh despite opposition by the state legislature. The bill received the assent of the president, and was published in The Gazette of India on 1 March. The bill included the provision to retain Hyderabad as the capital for up to ten years and the provision to ensure access to educational institutions for the same period. The bill received the assent of the president and was published in the gazette on 1 March 2014. The new state of Telangana came into existence on 2 June 2014 after approval from the president of India, with the residual state continuing as Andhra Pradesh. The present form of Andhra Pradesh is the same as that of Andhra State, except for Bhadrachalam town, which continues in Telangana. A number of petitions questioning the validity of the Andhra Pradesh Reorganisation Act have been pending before the Supreme Court constitutional bench since April 2014.

=== Post bifurcation ===
In the final elections held in the unified state in 2014, the TDP got a mandate in its favour, defeating its nearest rival, the YSR Congress Party, a breakaway faction of the Congress founded by Y. S. Jagan Mohan Reddy, son of former Chief Minister Y. S. Rajasekhara Reddy. N. Chandrababu Naidu, the chief of the TDP, became the chief minister on 8 June 2014. In 2017, the government of Andhra Pradesh began operating from its new greenfield capital, Amaravati, for which 33,000 acres were acquired from farmers through an innovative land pooling scheme. Interstate issues with Telangana relating to the division of assets of public sector institutions and organisations of the united state and the division of river waters are not yet resolved. In the 2019 elections, Y. S. Jagan Mohan Reddy, leader of the YSR Congress Party, became the chief minister by winning 151 out of 175 seats. He resumed celebrating the state formation day on 1 November from 2019. He introduced the 'village and ward volunteers’ system, and reorganised the state with 26 districts. Introduction of English as the medium of instruction in almost all the state schools, and the move to three capitals with Amaravati getting reduced to being the legislative capital, Vijag as the executive capital and Kurnool the judicial capital were stuck down by the high court. His government appealed to the supreme court.

== Capitals of Andhra Pradesh ==
Amaravati is the legislative capital and the de facto seat of government of Andhra Pradesh. The city is located on the banks of the Krishna River in Guntur district. Built on the southern banks of the Krishna River in the Guntur district, it was selected because it was close to the geographical center of the state.

Amaravati was founded by Andhra Pradesh Chief Minister N. Chandrababu Naidu in 2014 as the Greenfield administrative capital city of the Andhra Pradesh state, and its foundation stone was laid at Uddandarayunipalem by the Prime Minister of India, Narendra Modi on 22 October 2015.

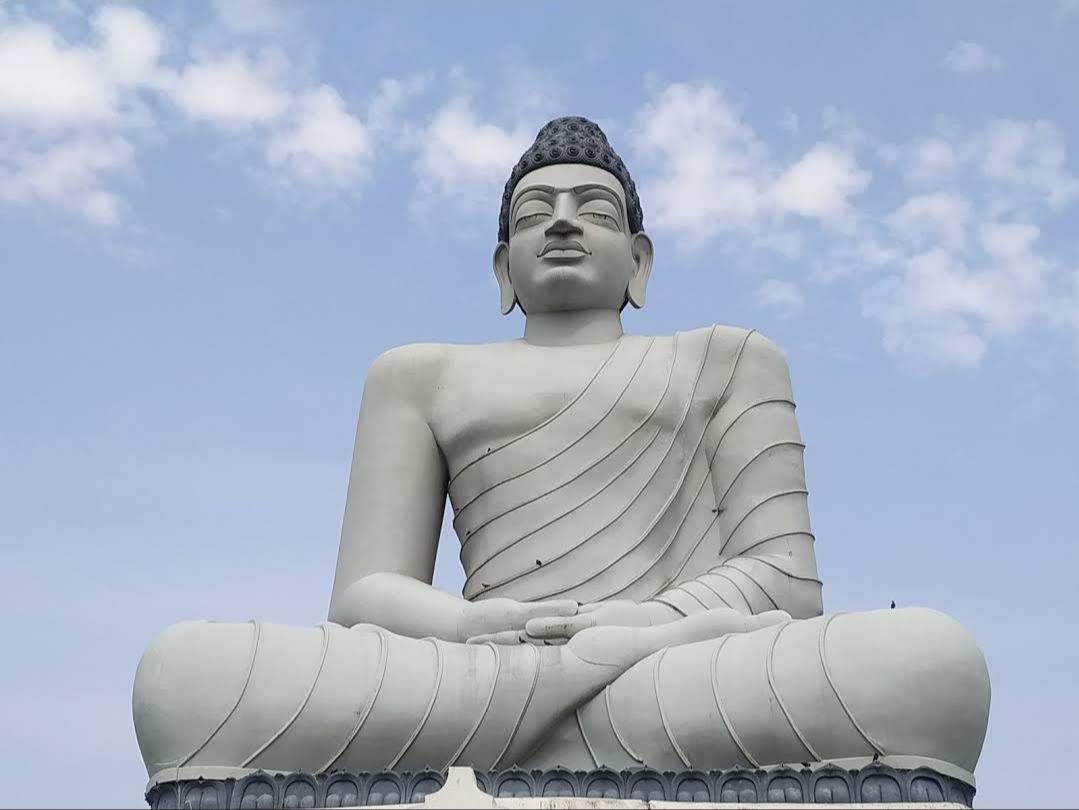

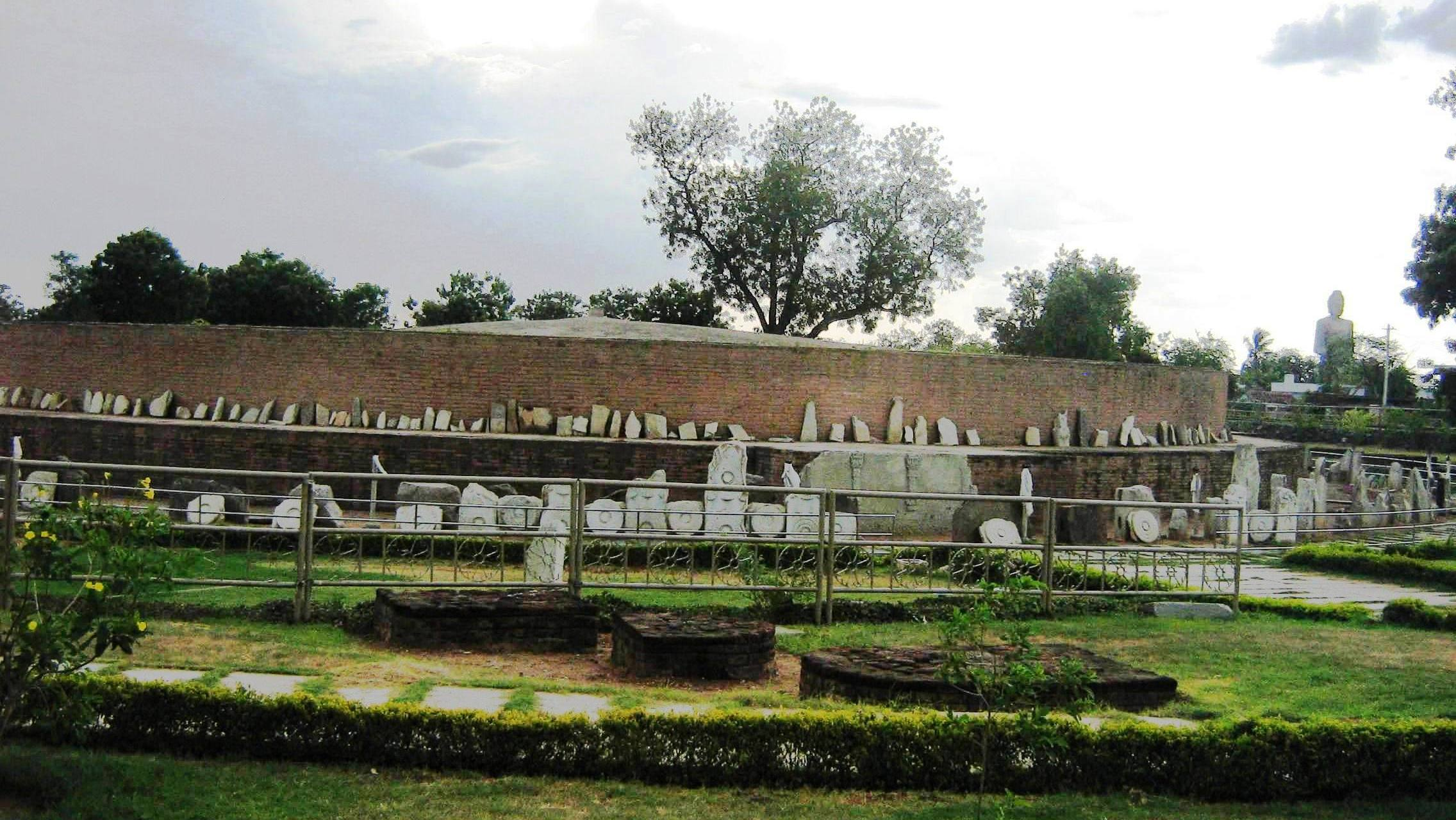

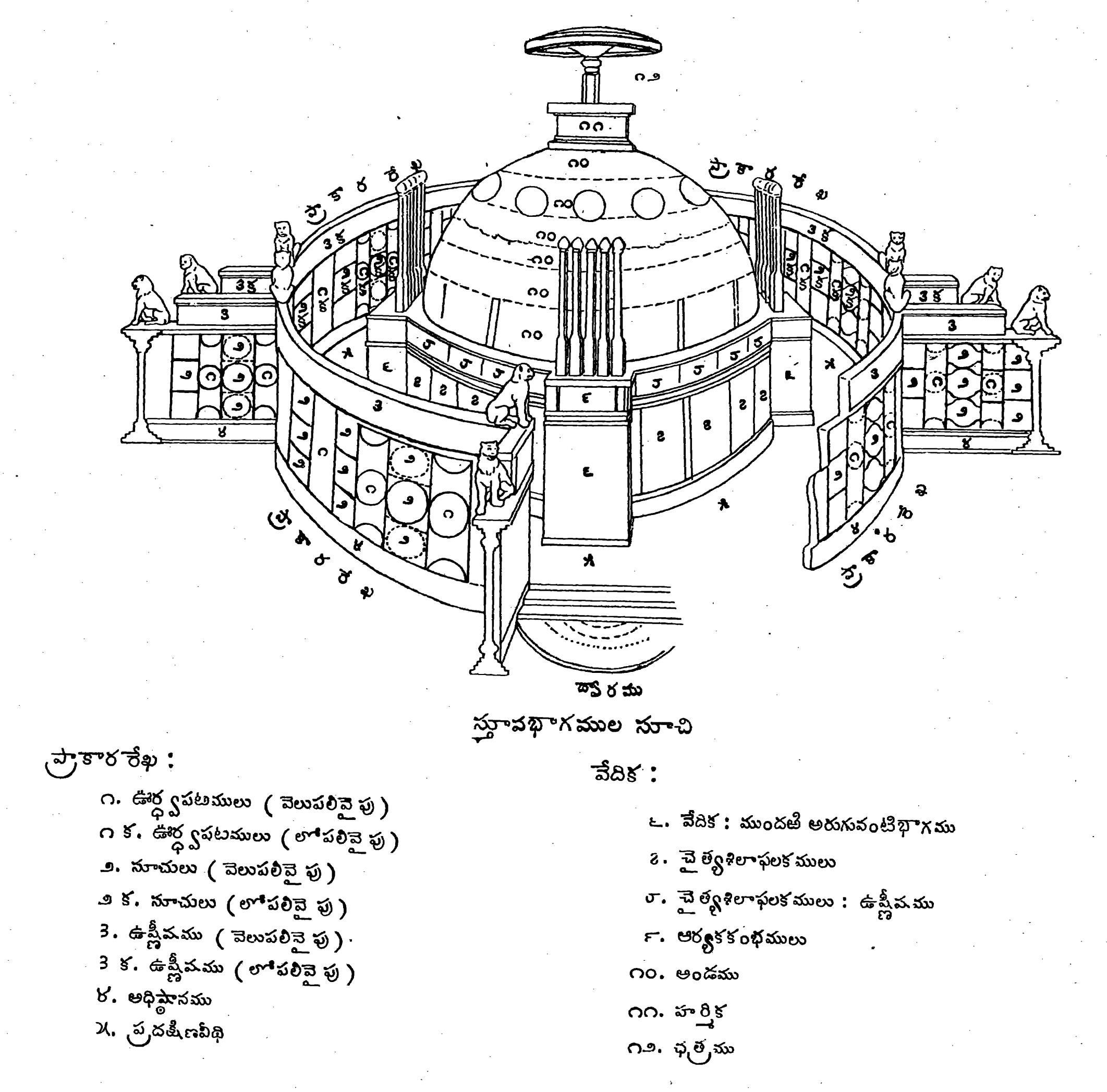

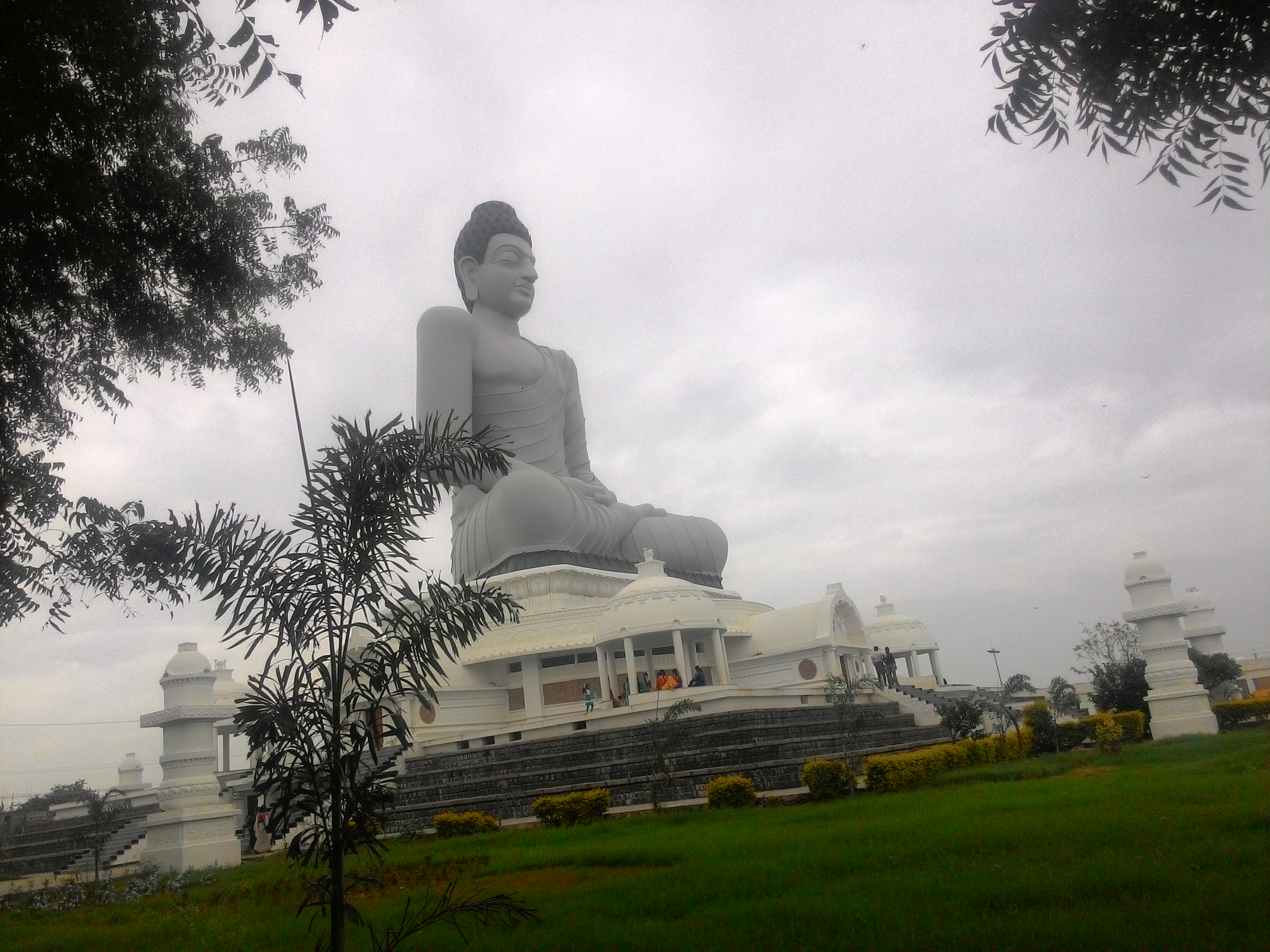

The office of the Chief Minister of Andhra Pradesh has operated from Velagapudi since April 2016. The Andhra Pradesh Legislature remained in Hyderabad until March 2017, when it relocated to newly constructed interim legislative buildings in Velagapudi.

Amaravati, formerly known as Dhānyakatakam, is important in the cultural heritage and history of Andhra Pradesh. Its history dates back to second century BCE, when it was the capital of the Satavahana Dynasty of the Andhras, one of the earliest Indian empires and the ancestral dynasty of Andhra Pradesh. The Satavahanas inaugurated the Telugu New Year festival Ugadi.

The city once a holy site of Mahayana Buddhism and had a large stupa known as Amaravati Stupa which later fell into ruins. It was the center of Buddhist learning and art, visited by many buddhist followers. Buddhist inscriptions, sculptures and Gautam Buddha Statue remain. Buddhist relics from the region were destroyed or exported to Chennai Museum and the British Museum during the British Raj and can be seen there today. The Amaravati Marbles depict many Buddhist art, inscriptions and buddhist stupas. Along with Nagarjuna Konda is viewed as one of the richest holy sites of Buddhism in all of India.

The capital recorded its first-ever legislation 2,200 years ago. The capital region includes ancient Amaravati. The area was ruled by the Mauryas, Satavahanas, Andhra Ikshvakus, Vishnukundina, Pallavas, Cholas, Kakatiyas, Delhi Sultanate, Reddys, Musunuri Nayaks, Bahmani Sultanate, Vijayanagara Empire, Sultanate of Golconda and Mughal Empire successively before the founding of the Nizam of Hyderabad in 1724. It was ceded to the Kingdom of France in 1750 but was captured by the British in 1759. Guntur returned to the Nizamate in 1768 but was ceded to Britain again in 1788. It was briefly occupied by Hyder Ali, then ruled by Vasireddy Venkatadri Nayudu. It was part of the Madras Presidency during the British colonial period.

Under the Andhra Pradesh Reorganisation Act, 2014, Hyderabad became the capital of the newly-formed state of Telangana, post-bifurcation of Andhra Pradesh. However, Hyderabad would remain as the joint capital of both states for a period not exceeding ten years. Hence, Amaravati is being built to serve as the capital of Andhra Pradesh.

The foundation for the city was laid at Uddandarayunipalem on 22 October 2015. The Prime Minister of India, Narendra Modi; the Chief Minister of Andhra Pradesh, N. Chandrababu Naidu; the minister of Housing and Urban Poverty Alleviation, Urban Development and Information and Broadcasting Muppavarapu Venkaiah Naidu; then Governor E. S. L. Narasimhan; the Japanese minister for economy trade and industry, Yosuke Takagi; and the Singaporean Minister for Trade and Industry, S. Iswaran, laid the foundation for the city.

== Dynasties ==
- Telugu Cholas
- Satavahana
- Shakas
- Andhra Ikshvaku
- Bruhatpalayana
- Ananda Gotrika
- Vishnukundina
- Kalachuris of Chedi
- Salankayana
- Pallavas
- Vengi
- Pandyan dynasty
- Rashtrakuta dynasty
- Kakatiya dynasty
- Musunuri Nayaks
- Reddy dynasty
- Paricheda
- Qutb Shahi
- Gupta dynasty

== See also ==
- History of Visakhapatnam
- History of India

== Bibliography ==
- Gade, Jayaprakash Narayana (2016), Water Resources and Tourism Promotion in Telangana State, Zenon Academic Publishing, ISBN 978-9385886041
- Ninan, M. M. (2008), Madathil Mammen Ninan, Madathil Mammen Ninan, ISBN 978-1438228204
- Rao, P. Raghunatha (1994), History And Culture Of Andhra Pradesh: From The Earliest Times To The Present Day, Sterling Publishers, ISBN 81-207-1719-8
- Sadasivan, Balaji (2011), The Dancing Girl: A History of Early India, Institute of Southeast Asian Studies, ISBN 9789814311670
- Sastry, P. V. Parabhrama (1978). N. Ramesan (ed.). The Kākatiyas of Warangal. Hyderabad: Government of Andhra Pradesh. OCLC 252341228.
- Sharma, R. K. (1980), The Kalachuris and their times, Sundeep Prakashan
- Talbot, Cynthia (2001). Precolonial India in Practice: Society, Region, and Identity in Medieval Andhra. Oxford University Press. ISBN 978-0-19-513661-6.
- P, Raghunadha Rao (1978). History of Modern Andhra. New Delhi: Sterling Publishers Pvt. Ltd.
- Faruqui, Munis D. (2013). "At Empire's End: The Nizam, Hyderabad and Eighteenth-century India". In Richard M. Eaton; Munis D. Faruqui; David Gilmartin; Sunil Kumar (eds.). Expanding Frontiers in South Asian and World History: Essays in Honour of John F. Richards. Cambridge University Press. pp. 1–38. ISBN 978-1-107-03428-0.
