= Vijayapuri =

Vijayapuri may refer to:

- Vijayapuri (Erode), a census town in Erode district, Tamil Nadu, India
  - Vijayamangalam railway station
  - Vijayamangalam Jain temple
- Vijayapuri (North), a census town in Nalgonda district, Andhra Pradesh, India
- Vijayapuri (South), a village in Guntur district, Andhra Pradesh, India
- The ancient name for present-day Nagarjunakonda, a town in Andhra Pradesh, India

== See also ==
- Vijaypur (disambiguation)
- Vijayapuri Veeran, 1960 Indian film
