= Bijapur (disambiguation) =

Bijapur is a city in the Indian state of Karnataka.

Bijapur may also refer to :

- Bijapur Sultanate under the Adil Shahi dynasty (1490-1687)
- Bijapur Subah, a Mughal imperial province

== Places ==
=== Karnataka ===
- Bijapur Airport
- Bijapur railway station
- Bijapur district, Karnataka, a district in the state of Karnataka
- Bijapur Taluka one of the five administrative subdivisions, of Bijapur District
  - Bijapur City (Vidhana Sabha constituency), the current legislative assembly constituency centered around the taluka
  - Bijapur (Vidhana Sabha constituency), the defunct assembly constituency of Karnataka
- Bijapur (Lok Sabha constituency), a Lok Sabha constituency in comprising Bijapur district

Elsewhere in India

- Bijapur district, Chhattisgarh, a district in Chhattisgarh state
  - Bijapur, Chhattisgarh, a town in the Bijapur district of Chhattisgarh
    - Bijapur (Chhattisgarh) (Vidhan Sabha constituency), the legislative assembly constituency centered around the town
- Bijapur, Rajasthan, a town in Pali district, Rajasthan

== See also ==
- Vijaypur (disambiguation)
