= Society of the Rashtrakuta empire of Manyakheta =

The Rashtrakuta empire of Manyakheta was an Indian empire that ruled most of the modern-day region of south and central India between the 8th to the 10th centuries. Their regal capital was Manyakheta in Kalaburagi district, Karnataka state, India. The Rashtrakuta society in many ways reflected the emerging religious, political and cultural developments of those times.

== Society ==
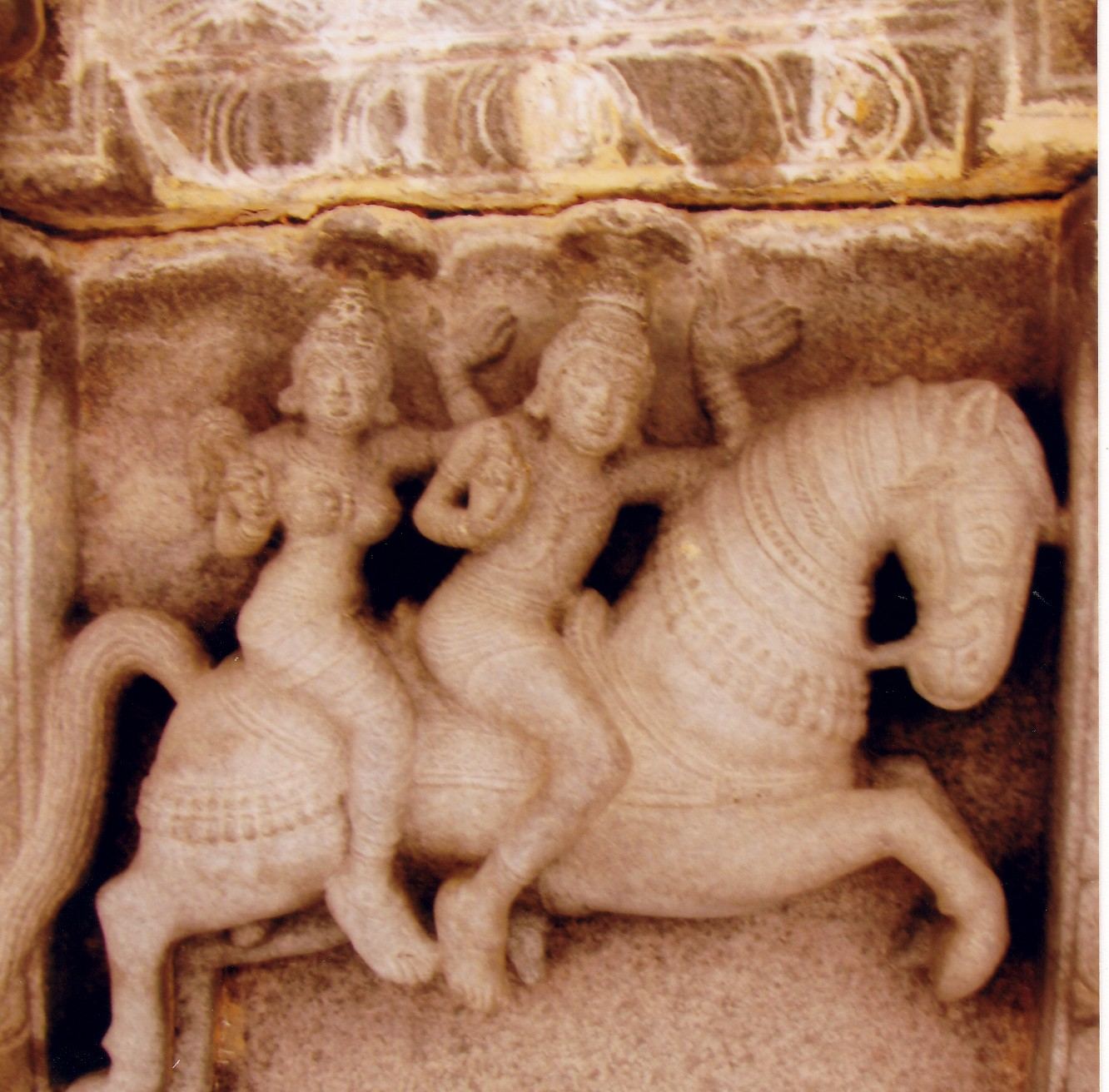
Roof sculpture, Panchakuta Basadi, Kambadahalli

Information regarding social life, the caste system, life style and recreational activities during the Rashtrakuta times comes from inscriptions and from the notes of Greek and Arab travellers to India at the time. These sources provide evidence that the Hindu caste system was widespread. Chronicles mention more castes than the four basic castes in the Hindu social system known today, some as many as seven castes. One traveller's account mentions sixteen castes including the four basic castes of Brahmins, Kshatriya, Vaishya and Chandalas. One caste known as Zakaya or Lahud consisted of people belonging to communities specialising in dance and acrobatics. Intercaste marriages were uncommon except between highly placed Kshatriya girls and Brahmin boys. People belonging to such professions as sailing, hunting, weaving, cobblery, basket making and fishing were all accommodated into castes or subcastes. The Antyajas belonged to a caste that provided many menial services to the wealthy. Among people of upper castes only those Kshatriyas belonging to the Sat-Kshatriya sub-caste (noble Kshatriyas) were considered higher in status than the Brahmins who otherwise enjoyed the highest status in Rashtrakuta society. A subcaste among Brahmins was the istin who were solely specialised in the teaching the profession.

Brahmins were mostly involved in careers related to teaching, judiciary, astrology, mathematics, poetry and philosophy. However it was common for Brahmins to occupy hereditary administrative posts as well. In addition, such professions normally considered non-Brahminical – agriculture, trade in Betel nuts and martial posts – were increasingly occupied by Brahmins. People of the medical profession were treated with regard and inscriptions mention some Brahmin doctors. Capital punishment though commonly practiced was not given to Brahmins who were found guilty of heinous crimes and in this respect they enjoyed the same privileges as royal Kshatriya sub-castes. Instead, as an alternate punishment their right hand and left foot were severed leaving them disabled. The killing of a Brahmin in medieval Hindu India was considered as a heinous crime and this alternate punishment served the purpose of enforcement of the law. The only caste of people considered above the Brahmins were the Kshatriyas belonging to royal and noble families. Not all Kshatriyas were considered upper caste and not all upper caste people were Kshatriyas.

By the 9th century, kings from all the four castes had at one time or another occupied the highest seat in the monarchical system in Hindu India. Admitting Kshatriyas to Vedic schools along with Brahmins was common, although children of the Vaishya and Shudra castes were not allowed in these schools. Jains took up martial careers and landownership by people of all castes is recorded in inscriptions The Shudras had land rights in that any plot of land taken from one by fraud was restored back to them by the King himself. Brahmins, unlike the Vaishya and Shudra, were free to relocate from one province to another and even from one kingdom to another, where they were welcomed with gifts of land and housing. Special places of learning called brahmadeya were constructed for them. The caste system was flexible to the extent that there are records of intercaste marriages although this was not common. However, toward the end of the Rashtrakuta rule, these intercaste marriages, especially those involving a Brahmin bride or groom, were becoming very rare while the practice remained relatively frequent among other castes. Brahmins were pure vegetarians and abstained from consuming alcohol of any kind while Kshatriyas indulged in both. Jainism had become popular among traders and agriculturists who popularized vegetarianism. Intercaste functions were rare as dining together between people of various castes was avoided.

Joint families were the norm but legal separations between brothers and even father and son have been recorded in inscriptions. Women and daughters had rights over property and land, and there are inscriptions recording the sale of land by women. Moneys inheritable by women were called Sthridhana. The arranged marriage system ensured a strict policy of early marriage for women. Among Brahmins, boys married at or below 16 years of age and they chose brides of 12 or younger. This age policy was not as strictly followed by other castes. Inscriptions refer to numerous instances of the marriage of a man to his maternal cousin (daughter of a maternal uncle), prince Jagattunga, son of Krishna II being an example of this. Women had the right to attend and the right to be in attendance in the court when it was occupied by the King. Sati was practiced but was voluntary. Very few examples of sati are noted in inscriptions and those that did occur were mostly in the royal families. The system of shaving the heads of widows was rarely practiced as epigraphs note that widows were allowed to grow their hair but decorating their hair was discouraged. The sentence "the cause of the cessation of the parting of the hairs of the damsels of enemies" (ripuvilasiriisimantoddharanahetuh) is repeated in many inscriptions. The remarriage of a widow was rare among the upper castes and common among the lower castes. Women who were dishonoured were admitted back into their families and caste.

Loans were granted in the presence of witnesses unless the receiver of the loan was of high social standing, in which case this requirement was waived. In the general population men wore two simple pieces of cloth, a loose garment on top and a garment worn like a dhoti for the lower part of the body. Only kings could wear turbans, a practice that spread to the masses much later. Women's clothes were well stitched, and some wore petticoats. Names of Brahmin men consisted of the given name, the father's name and the family gotra (lineage). The surnames popular today such as Dvivedi, Upadhyaya, Dikshita came into vogue only later. Dancing was a popular recreational activity and inscriptions speak of royal women being charmed by dancers, both male and female, in the king's palace. Devadasis were often present in temples. Other recreational activities included attending animal fights of the same or different species. The Atakur inscription, a hero stone (virgal), was made for the favourite hound of feudatory Western Ganga King Butuga II that died fighting a wild boar in a sport. Game preserves for hunting by royalty are recorded in the inscriptions of Govinda III. Astronomy was well developed and so was astrology. Even Jains showed interest in astrological predictions and metaphysical beliefs. Superstitions were plentiful and catching a snake alive proved a woman's chastity. Old persons suffering from incurable diseases preferred to end their lives by drowning in the sacred waters of pilgrim site or by burning themselves.
