= Vijaypur =

Vijaypur or Vijayapur may refer to:

- Vijayapura, Karnataka, also known as Bijapur
- Vijaypur, Uttarakhand, a hill station in Bageshwar district, Uttarakhand, India
- Vijayapur, Nepal, a historical capital now part of the Dharan town
- Vijay Pur, Jammu and Kashmir, India
- Bijeypur, or Vijaypur, a city in the Sheopur District of Madhya Pradesh, India
- Raghogarh-Vijaypur, a town in Guna district, Madhya Pradesh, India

== See also ==
- Bijapur (disambiguation)
- Vijaypur Assembly constituency (disambiguation)
- Vijayapuram (disambiguation)
- Vijayapuri (disambiguation)
