= Brahmadeya =

Tax-free land gift

Brahmadeya (Sanskrit for "given to Brahmana") was a tax free land gift, either in the form of a single plot or whole villages, donated to Brahmanas in early medieval India. It was initially practiced by the ruling dynasties and was soon followed up by the chiefs, merchants, feudatories, etc. Brahmadeya was devised as a means to develop the village and install culture.

== Overview ==
Brahmadeya represented the grant of land either in a single plot or whole villages donated to Brahmanas by making them land-owners or land-controllers. It was also given to more than one Brahmana (ekabhoga), to several Brahmana families (ganabhogam) which is estimated to be from few to several hundreds or even more than thousands, particularly in South India. The gifts of land were mostly selected around the irrigation facilities such as tanks or lakes and were supposed to be operable to fulfill the needs of the donees. In the absence of facility, new means of irrigation systems were created near the brahmadeyas. The kings and feudatories were to lose their right over donated lands and could not take it back even in the absence of heirs. In the absence of heir, brahamdeya was transferred to some other eligible person of the same caste. Though mostly lands, other objects such as food, grains, paddy, gold, money, cow, oxen, ploughshare, etc. were also given away as a gift.

Brahmadeyas helped to bring virgin land under cultivation and to integrate the existing rural settlement into a new economic order, dominated by the Brahmana proprietors. They were exempted from various land taxes and dues either entirely or partially such as in the initial states of settlement. The taxes from the donated villages were assigned to Brahmana donees. Brahamdeyas also helped the ruling families as they did gain the ideological support for their political power. It is said to be a chief characteristic of the Indian feudalism.

The donation of land sometimes represented more than just the transfer of land rights. At many instances, human resources such as peasants, artisans and others along with revenues and economic resources were also transferred to the donees. There are several inscriptional evidences of conflicts between peasants, Brahmanas, and donors arising out of alienation of rights. Among other conflicting issues, right over drawing water was the most sensitive issue. An inscription dated back to 1080 CE belonging to the Hasan Taluk mentions a water dispute between a Brahmana and a farmer's family. Another inscription from the same taluk of 1230 CE. evidences the death of two farmers over land rights issue. Peasants were sometimes forced to agree to the conversion of their land into brahamdeya by denying water to them. In the brahmadeya villages, villagers were landless laborers who were paid a portion of the crop they helped to cultivate.

== History ==
In the Deccan region, specifically present-day Maharashtra, Buddhist establishments are known to have received land grants during Satavahana rule since as early as 1st century CE. The historical evidence of the practice of donating lands to Brahmanas in return for spiritual favour is traced back to 3rd-4th century CE in South India. The earliest royal land grant inscription that mentions the word "brahmadeya" is discovered from the 3rd century CE during the reign of Bruhatpalayana King Jayavarman.

Brahmadeya soon developed into a systematic attempt to avail subsistence to Brahmanas and a common practice from the 4th century CE onward . The registration of donated land that included cultivable land, garden, residential plot were recommended by the Smritis and Puranas of the post-Gupta period and were recorded on the copper plates. The tradition of land grants through the history of practice took the shape of a legal form governed by the law book called Dharmaśāstra. The Anushasana Parva, a part of the great epic Mahabharata has a complete chapter dedicated to Bhumi-dana-prasamsa, commending the gifts of land.

The Vakataka rulers made several land grants to Brahmanas in present-day Maharashtra: in the 5th century CE, the Vakataka king Pravarasena II is known to have granted land to as many as 1,000 Brahmanas in a single district, using a single charter. The Vakataka rulers also made several land donations to Brahmanas in central and western Madhya Pradesh. Their contemporaries, including Gupta vassals, donated lands to the Brahmanas in north-eastern Madhya Pradesh during the 4th and the 5th centuries. The Chhattisgarh region was Brahmanized during the 6th and the 7th centuries under the rule of the Nalas, the Sharabhapuriyas, and the Pandavas (of Mekala and Dakshina Kosala).

The eastern Andhra region was brahmanized in the 3rd and 4th centuries during the rule of the Ikshvakus (who also patronized the Buddhists), Salankayanas, and Vishnukundinas; the western region was brahmanized later, in the 5th century. The southern part of Karnataka came under Brahmanical influence under the Kadamba rule during the 5th and the 6th centuries, but large-scale Brahmana settlements came to be distributed in Karnataka during the Vatapi Chalukya rule in the 6th-8th centuries.

Epigraphic evidence suggests that the land grants to Brahmanas became frequent in northern Bengal and Assam in the 5th century; in the east Bengal in the 6th century; in Gujarat, Odisha, Himachal Pradesh (Kangra and Chamba), and Nepal in the 7th century.

Land grant inscriptions show that in present-day Tamil Nadu, the Chola rulers introduced Brahmana settlements during the 8th century, and such settlements increased considerably during 9th-10th centuries. In present-day Kerala, large-scale land grants to Brahmanas do not occur until the 10th-11th centuries.

== See also ==
- Sasan (land grant), tax-free land grant to the Charanas
