= Vijayapuram =

Vijayapura or Vijayapuram may refer to several places or entities in India:

- Bijapur (officially Vijayapura), a city in Karnataka
- Port Blair or Sri Vijaya Puram, capital city of Andaman and Nicobar
- Vijayapuram, Chittoor district, village in Andhra Pradesh, India
- Vijayapura, Bengaluru North, in Karnataka
- Vijayapuram Gram Panchayat, Kerala, India
  - Diocese of Vijayapuram
- Avidanalla Vijayapuram, a village in Thanjavur district, Tamil Nadu
- Vijayapuram, Pudukkottai, village in Pudukkottai district, Tamil Nadu

== See also ==
- Vijaypur (disambiguation)
