= Vijaypur Assembly constituency =

Vijaypur Assembly constituency may refer to

- Vijaypur, Madhya Pradesh Assembly constituency
- Vijaypur, Jammu and Kashmir Assembly constituency
