= Araveedu =

- Village
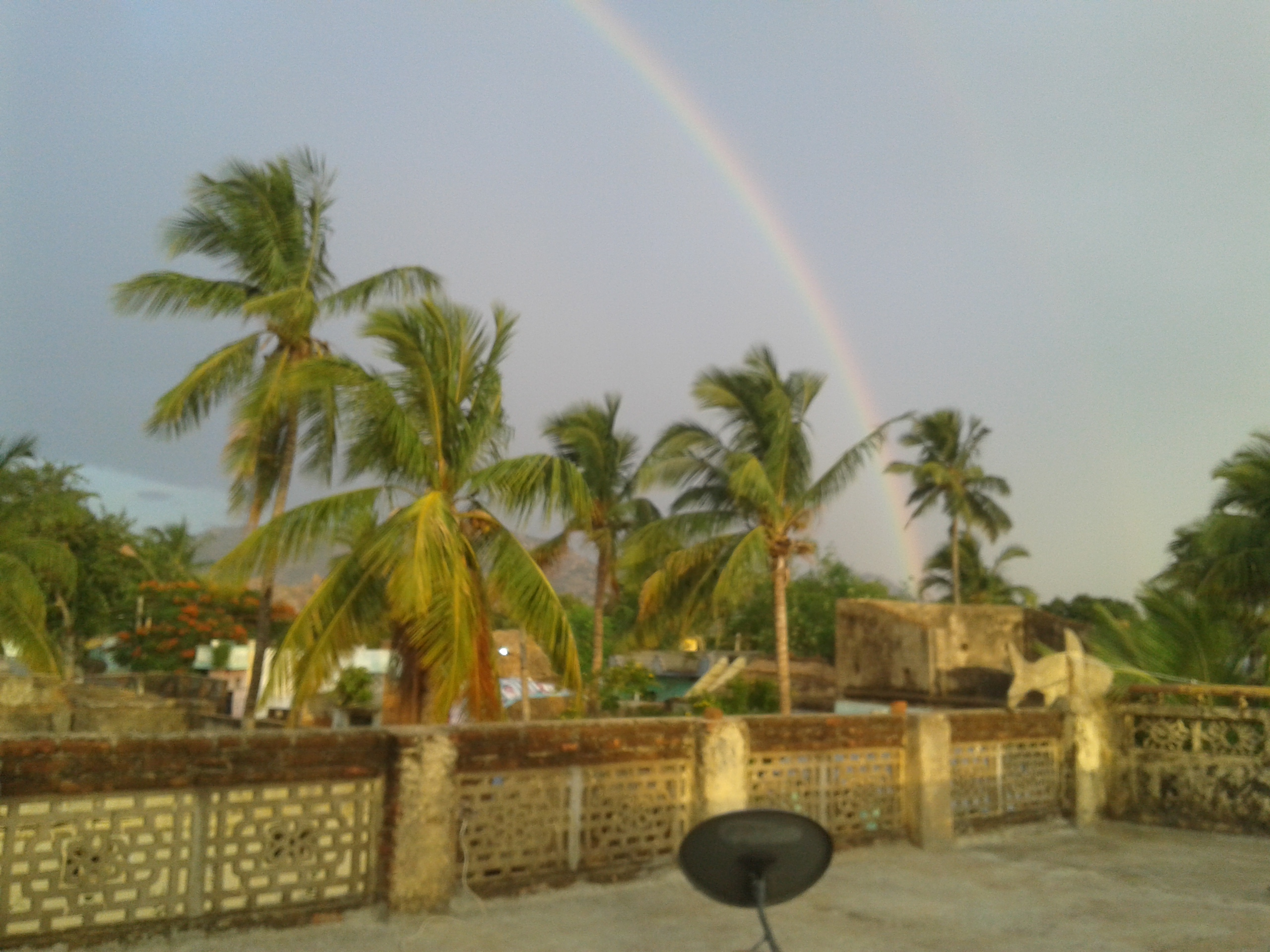
- Interactive map of Araveedu
- Location in Andhra Pradesh, India Araveedu (India)
- Coordinates: 13.992244°N 78.523622°E
- Country: India
- State: Andhra Pradesh
- District: Annamayya District
- Established: Before 80s

Government
  - Body: Araveedu Grama panchayat

Languages
  - Official: Telugu
- Time zone: UTC+5:30 (IST)
- Postal code: 516267
- Vehicle registration: AP04, AP39

Araveedu is a village on the banks of Kushavathi river in Annamayya district in the Indian state of Andhra Pradesh. It is located in Galiveedu Mandal. There are 5 sub areas in Araveedu which are Araveedu Kaspa which is also known as Araveedu, Sree Nagar, Hussainabad, Malasanivaripalle and Kasireddygaripalle. It is famous for its Mango gardens, Baligutta View point and Kushavathi Reservoir. It is also famous in terms of festivals celebrations like Sankranti, Ramzan, Dussera, Bakraid, Donakonda Ganga Bhavani Ammavari Jaatara and Moharram Celebrations. The postal pin code for Araveedu is 516267. The official languages in Araveedu are Telugu and English and Araveedu peoples use to speak in mainly languages which are Telugu and Urdu languages. Bangalore is a nearest metropolitan city to the Araveedu.

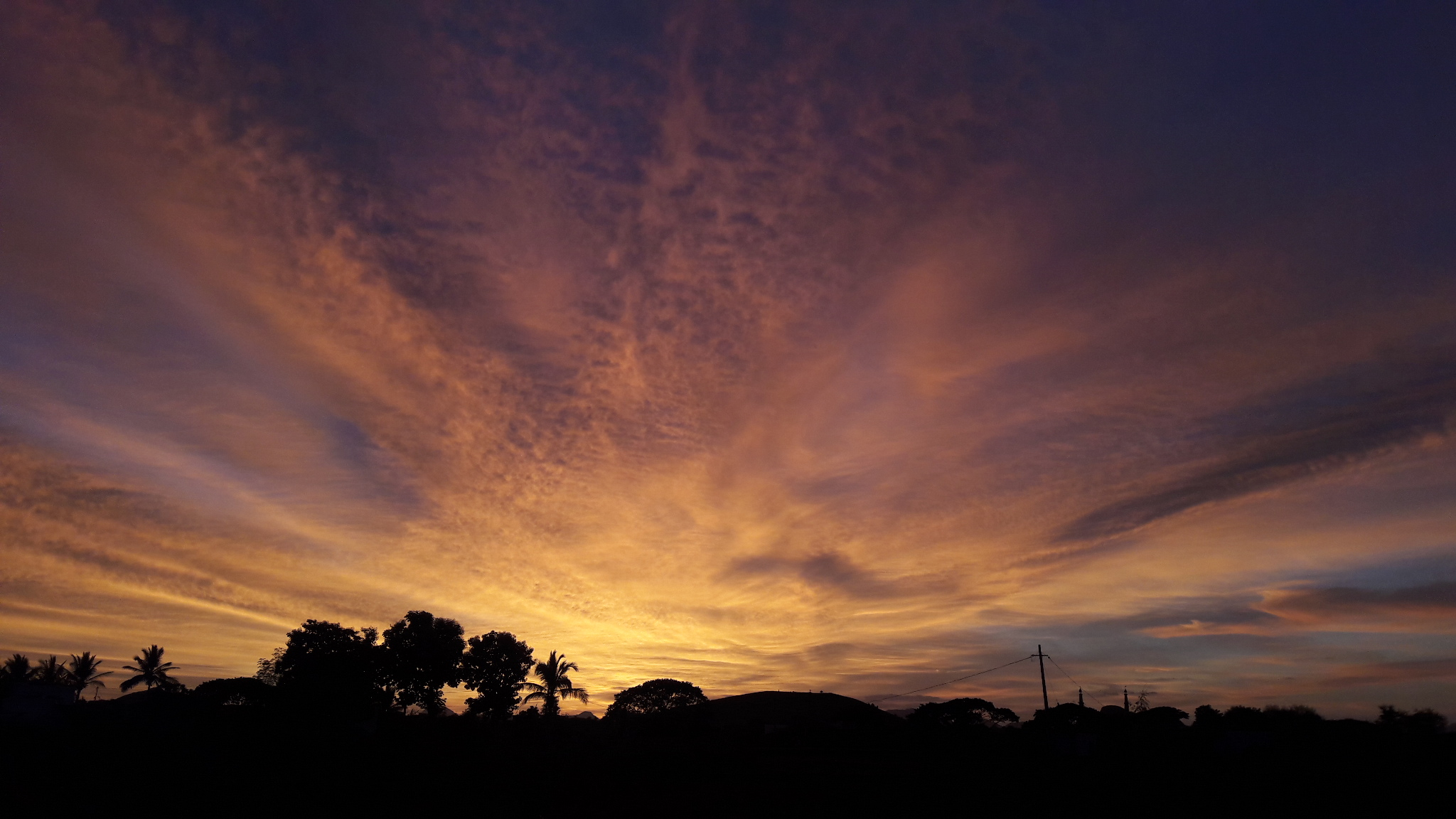
Sunset in Araveedu.

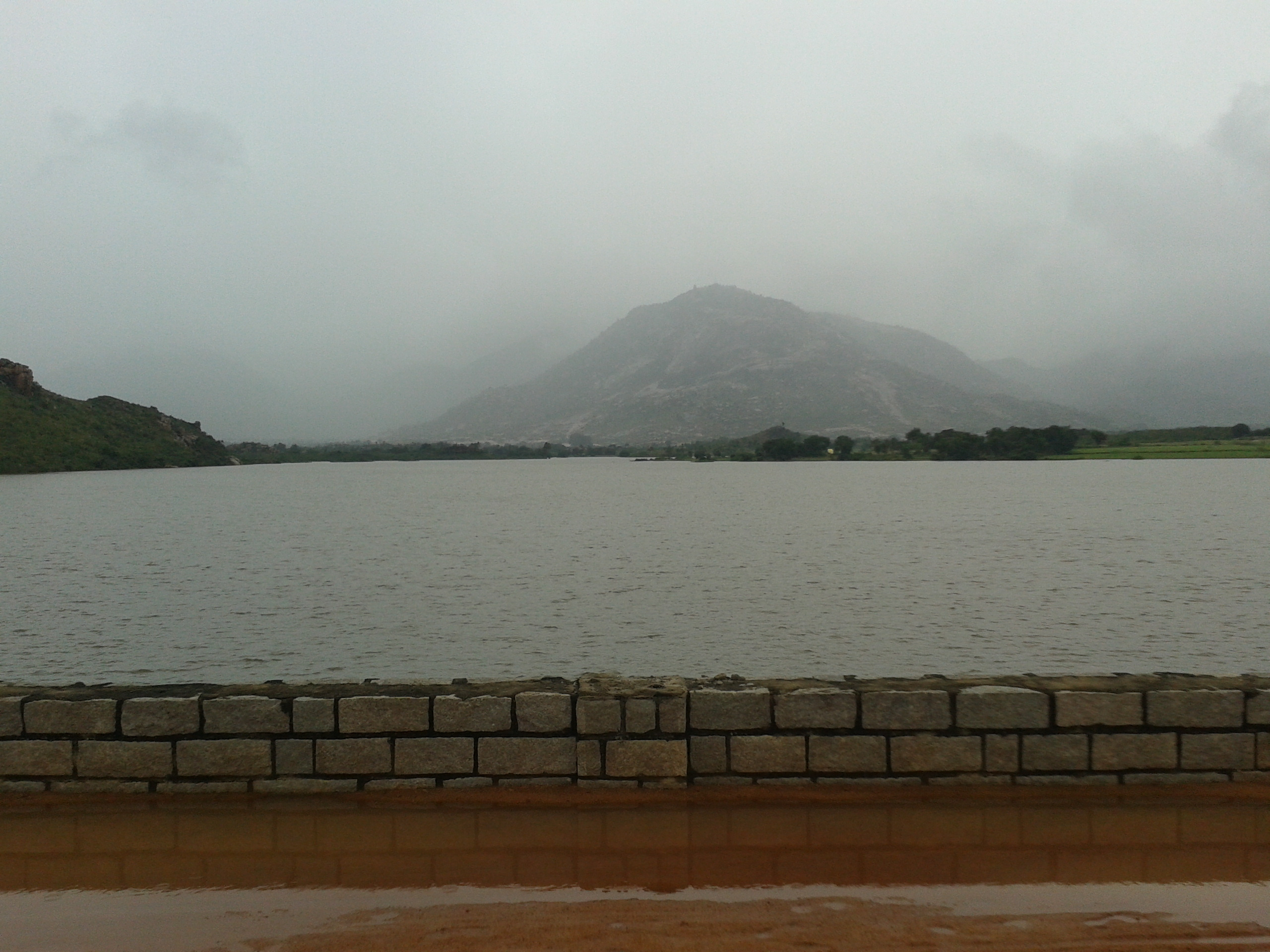
Araveedu Kushavathi Reservoir.

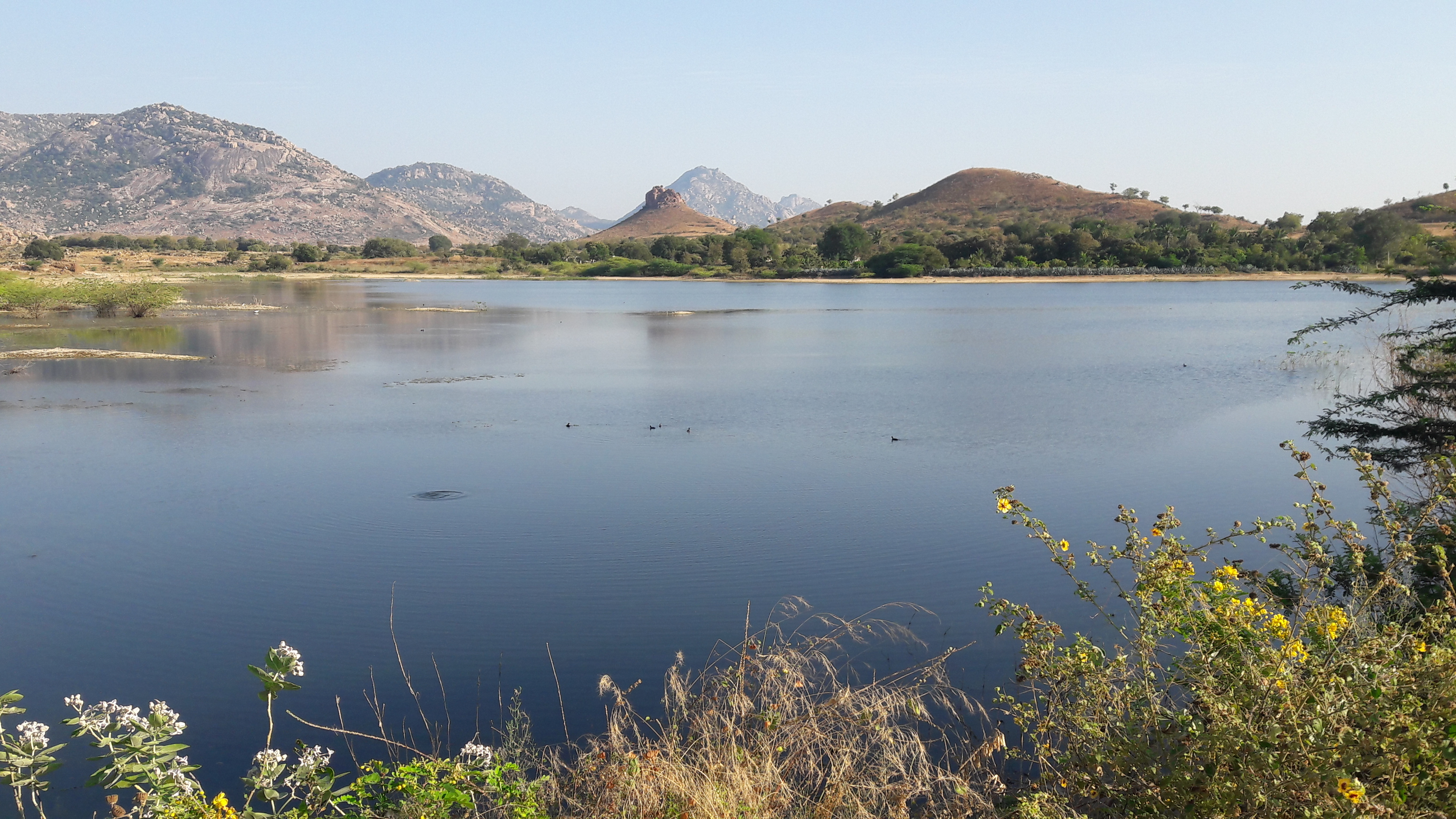
Araveedu Pond.
