= Bijapur, Rajasthan =

Bijapur
- Village
- Nickname: Vijapur
- Location in Rajasthan
- Coordinates: 25°03′25″N 73°15′18″E
- Country: India
- State: Rajasthan
- District: Pali

Government
  - MLA(Member of Rajasthan state assy: Pushpendra Singh Ranawat

Languages
  - Official: Marwari, Hindi
- Time zone: UTC+5:30 (IST)
- PIN: 306707
- Telephone code: 912933
- ISO 3166 code: RJ-IN
- Vehicle registration: RJ-22

Bijapur is a village in the Pali district of Rajasthan and in 3rd century.

== Places of interest ==
Rata Mahaveerji or Hathundi Teerth was built in 313 A.D. (370 V.S.) and was earlier dedicated to Parshvanatha. After the installation idol of Shri Mahaveer Bhagwan in 1278 (1335 V.S.) this temple has Bhagwan Mahaveer Swami as its primary deity. This idol is made of bricks, sand and calcium, having a reddish (Rata) colour and hence also is called Rata Mahaveerji. This 135-cm tall idol of Mahaveer Swami is in a padmasan position. The 4th century idol is still present in this temple.

This temple has curvilinear superstructure decorated with multiple turret. The temple feature pillars with elaborate carvings similar to torana pattern. The temple has large domical structure as the central shrine with sub-shrine along the axis of principal shrine.
