= Bruhatpalayana =

Ancient Indian dynasty

The Bruhat Palayanas were an ancient Indian dynasty based in the modern state of Andhra Pradesh. They ruled Northern Andhra with Pithunda, near Machilipatnam as the capital after the Ikshvakus around the third century. Jaya Varma was the only known Bruhatpalayana ruler. A princess of his family was married to the Andhra Ikshvaku king. His Kingdom included Musala Taluk as far as Gudivada, Kolleru and northern parts of Guntur. He gave the village of Patur in Tenali Taluk to eight Brahmins. After his death the Ananda Gotrikas occupied his territory to the south of the Krishna river and the Salankayanas took his territory north of the river.

The name of the dynasty is derived from the words Bruhat (Vastness) and Palayana (Moving).

The Hathigumpha inscription mentioned that Pithunda was destroyed by Kharavela (180 BCE) of Kalinga. The city of Pithunda is referred to as a metropolis in one of Ptolemy's works. Jayavarma, the only king known of the dynasty, ruled Krishna district with Pithunda as his capital between A.D. 270–285. A copper plate grant in the form of an order issued by Jayavarma to the governor of Kuduru ahara (district) was discovered at Kondamudi, near Tenali at around A.D.280 which describes his victorious camp at Kudura (Guduru near Machilipatnam). He has granted this land in favour of a number of Brahmins. A charter in Prakrit language he issued describes that he is a devotee of Maheswara and he called himself as Raja. They had been subdued by Pallavas.
