= Vijayapuri (North) =

Vijayapuri Nagarjuna Sagar
- Census town
- Location in Telangana, India Vijayapuri (India)
- Coordinates: 16°36′10″N 79°18′27″E
- Country: India
- State: Telangana
- District: Nalgonda

Population (2001)
  - Total: 19,333

Languages
  - Official: Telugu
- Time zone: UTC+5:30 (IST)
- Vehicle registration: TS
- Website: telangana.gov.in

Vijayapuri (North) is a census town in Nalgonda district in the Indian state of Telangana. It consists of two colonies, Hill Colony and Pylon Colony. These colonies are basically constructed to accommodate the workers of Nagarjuna Sagar Dam construction who later settled there with several government jobs. There are government and private educational institutes from KG to Degree. For professional degrees like engineering and medicine, students travel to nearby cities like Hyderabad (150 km) and Nalgonda (60 km).

== Demographics ==
As of 2001 India census, Vijayapuri (North) had a population of 19,333. Males constitute 52% of the population and females 48%. Vijayapuri (North) has an average literacy rate of 72%, higher than the national average of 59.5%: male literacy is 81%, and female literacy is 62%. In Vijayapuri (North), 10% of the population is under 6 years of age.
