= Nagavali River =

River in India

Nagavali Langulya
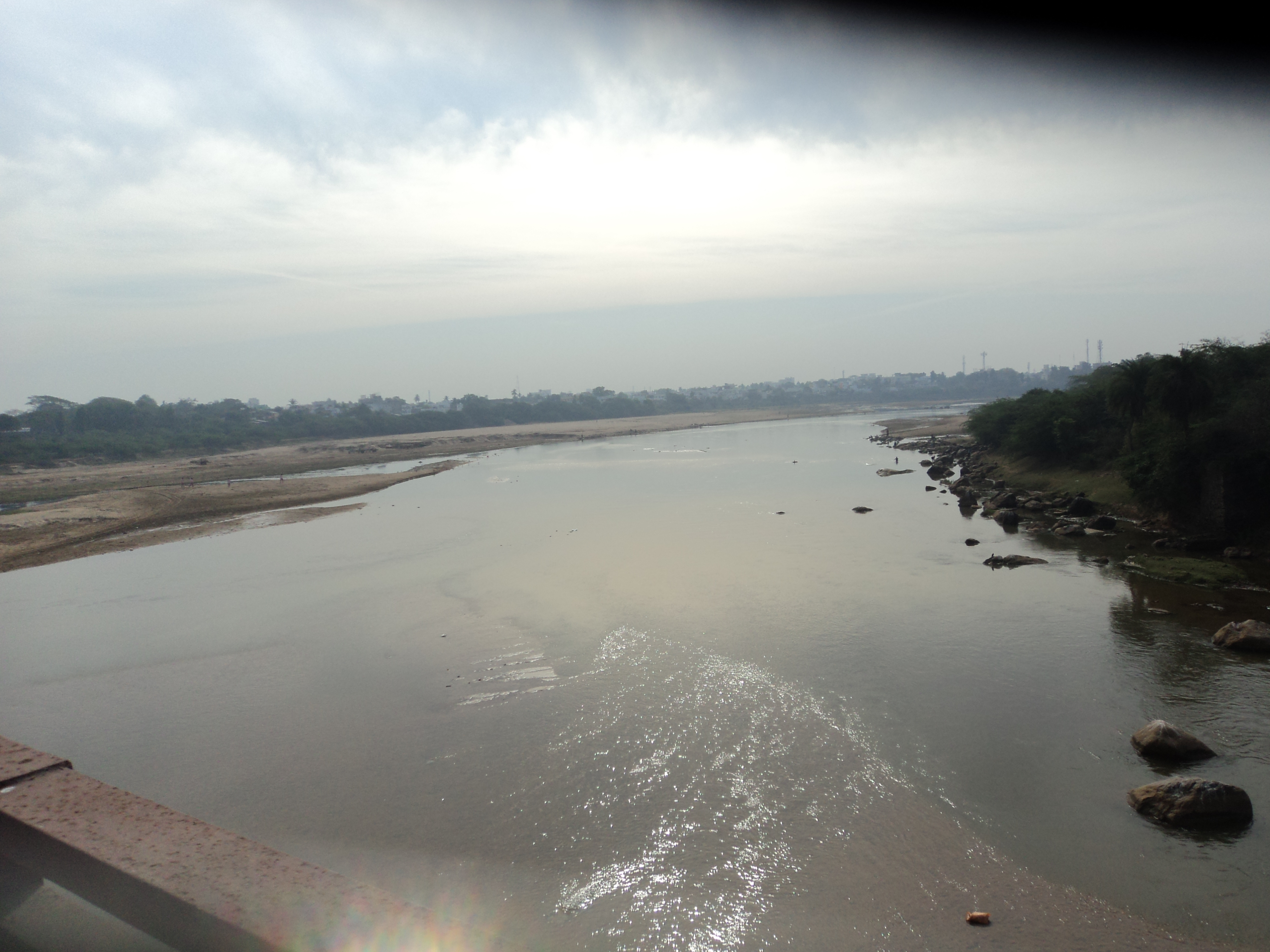

Location
- Country: India

Physical characteristics
- Source: Lakhbahal
  - location: Kalahandi
- Length: 256.5 km (159.4 mi)approx.
- Discharge
  - location: Bay of Bengal
  - average: 35 m^{3}/s (1,200 cu ft/s)

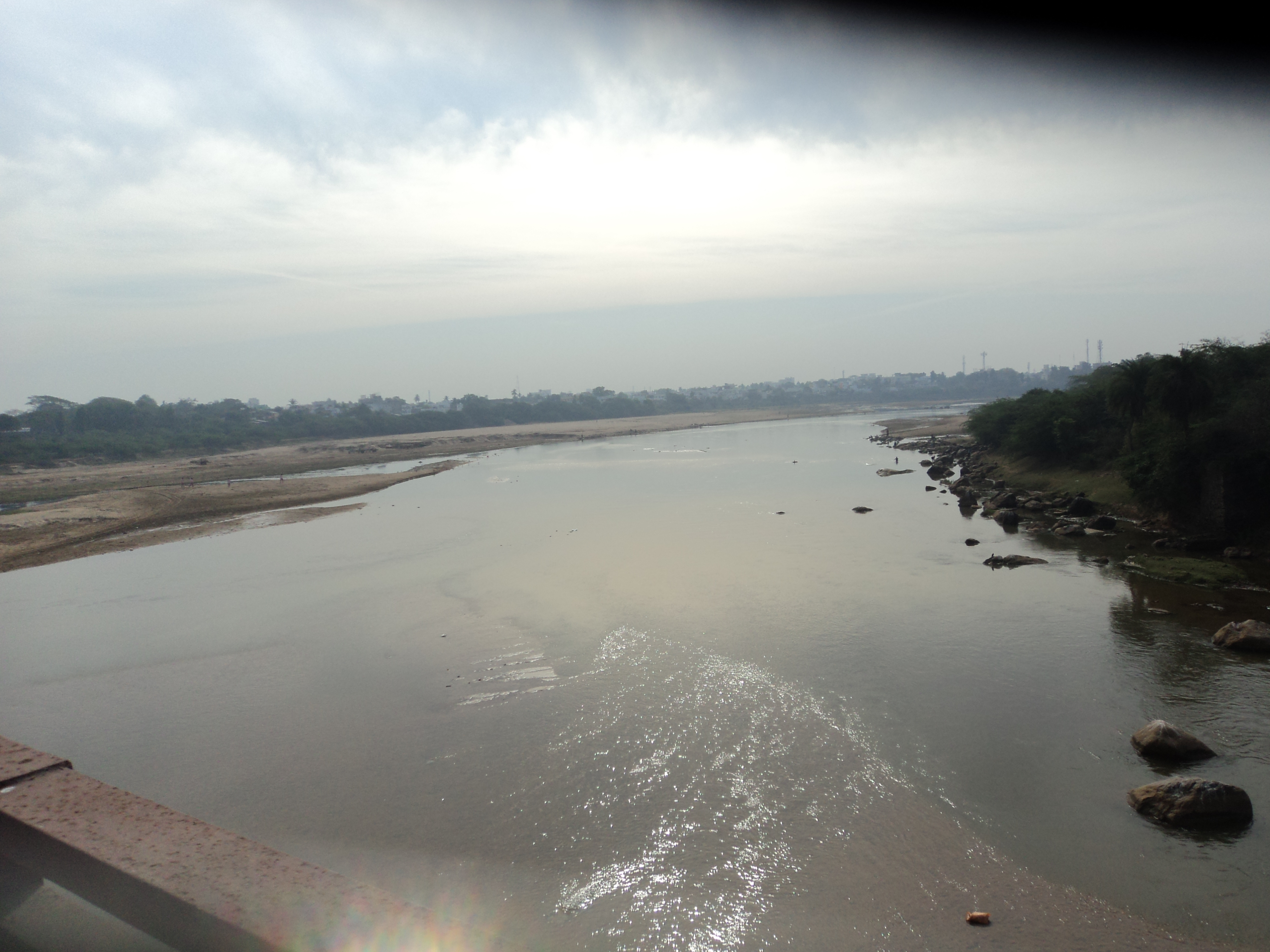
Nagavali river near Srikakulam.

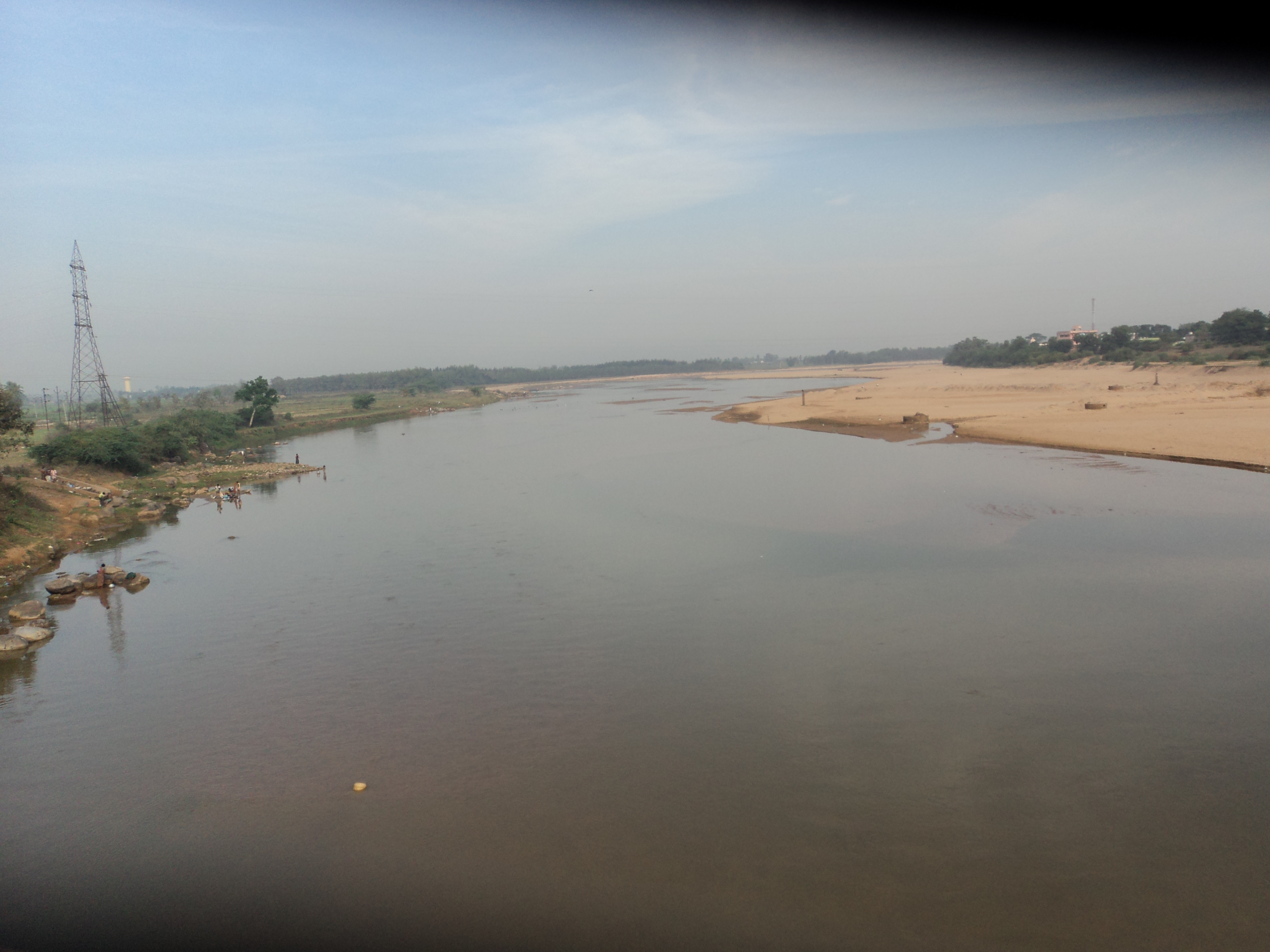
Nagavali river near Srikakulam.

The River Nagavali also known as Langulya is one of the main rivers of Southern Odisha and Andhra States in India, between Rushikulya and Godavari basins.

== Origin and course ==
Nagavali River originates from a hill near Lakhbahal village in Thuamul Rampur block of Kalahandi District. It touches Nakrundi, Kerpai areas of Kalahandi, Kalyansinghpur, Jaykaypur, and Rayagada of Rayagada district of Odisha and merges in Bay of Bengal near Kallepalli village near Srikakulam after crossing by the side of Srikakulam of Andhra Pradesh. It is an independent river with its own basin.

The total length of the river is about 256 kilometres (159 mi), of which 161 kilometres (100 mi) are in Odisha and the rest in Andhra Pradesh. The catchment area of the basin is 9,510 square kilometres (3,670 sq mi). Nagavali is an interstate river with 4,462 square kilometres (1,723 sq mi) and 5,048 square kilometres (1,949 sq mi) river basin area located in Odisha and Andhra Pradesh respectively. The river basin receives 1,000 millimetres (39 in) average rainfall annually. The yearly water availability in the river basin at Narayanapuram barrage is 1.117 billion cubic meters on average. The uplands of the river basin are hilly areas with a predominantly tribal population. It drains parts of the Kalahandi, Rayagada and Koraput districts of Odisha and Srikakulam, Vizianagaram districts of Andhra Pradesh.

== Tributaries ==
The main tributaries of the River Nagavali are Jhanjavati, Barha, Baldiya, Satnala, Sitagurha, Srikona, Gumudugedda, Vottigedda, Suvarnamukhi, Vonigedda, Relligedda and Vegavati. The Suvarnamukhi river rises in the hills of Salur mandal and takes an eastern direction and finally join the Nagavali at Sangam village in Vangara mandal of Srikakulam District. Vegavathi originates in pachipenta hills of Pachipenta Mandal.

- Vegavathi River rises in the in the Pachipenta hills in Eastern Ghats. It is a tributary to the Suvarnamukhi, which in turn is a tributary to River Nagavali. Salur town and Paradhi are located on the banks of this river. There are two road bridges at these places.

== Towns and cities ==
- Jaykaypur: Nagavali river flows near to Jaykaypur. It has been one of the major sources of water for companies such as JK Paper Limited, a company of JK Organization.
- Rayagada town and district headquarters of Rayagada district of Odisha, River Nagavali flows in outskirts of the town.
- Srikakulam town, the district headquarters in Andhra Pradesh: River Nagavali flows through Srikakulam town and meets the sea at Pedda Ganagalla Peta village, 5 kilometers far from Srikakulam town.
- Hatipathar, near Rayagada: There are two waterfalls on the course of River Nagavali. The boulders here appear in a way that look like huge elephants.

== Irrigation projects ==
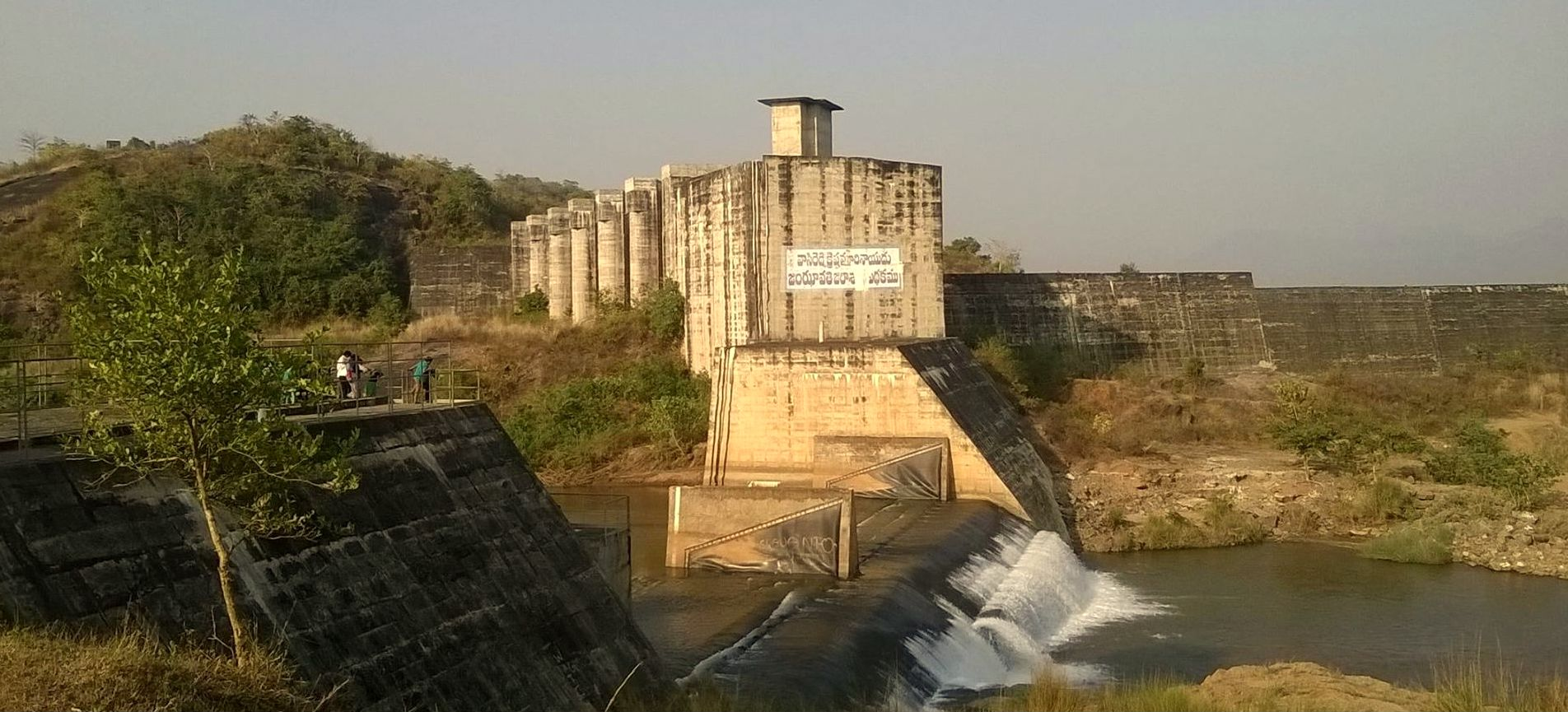
Janjavathi Rubber Dam

- Jhanjavati Project 18°51′49″N 83°26′05″E is located at Rajyalaxmipuram village in Komarada mandal of Parvathipuram Manyam district on Jhanjavati, a tributary of River Nagavali. It is a rubber dam and the first of its kind in Andhra Pradesh and India. It is aimed to utilize 4 TMC of available water and to irrigate / stabilize a total ayacut of 24,640 acres (9,970 ha) in Parvathipuram Manyam District. It was inaugurated on 1 January 2006 by Chief Minister Y. S. Rajasekhara Reddy. The rubber dam was installed on a concrete plate in technical collaboration with Hydro-Construct of Austria. However, the prior agreement between Odisha and Andhra Pradesh on this project permits to increase the maximum reservoir level submerging Odisha area up to 480 feet (150 m) msl. This dispute remains unsettled, preventing the use of the project's full irrigation potential since 2006 due to the 0.6 tmcft reservoir storage capacity against 4 tmcft planned storage. Andhra Pradesh wants to resolve the issue by constituting Nagavali water dispute tribunal under the Interstate River Water Disputes Act as the dispute is not getting settled by negotiations between the two states.
- Thotapalli Barrage is located on Nagavali River at village Thotapalli in Parvathipuram Manyam district. The earlier anicut was upgraded to a barrage.
- Madduvalasa Reservoir is located at Madduvalasa village in Vangara mandal of Srikakulam district. It is built across the Maddigedda tributary. The project is started in 1977 and provides water for 24,500 acres (9,900 ha) of land for cultivation.
- Vengalaraya Sagar 18°38′31″N 83°11′15″E with twin reservoirs to supply irrigation water, is located on Suvarnamukhi sub-tributary in the upstream of Madduvalasa Reservoir.
- Peddagadda reservoir 18°27′55″N 83°06′47″E is also located on Peddagadda sub-tributary in the upstream of Madduvalasa Reservoir.
- Narayanapuram barrage 18°29′07″N 83°48′31″E is located in Burja mandal of Srikakulam district across Nagavali River.
- Vamsadhara and Nagavali inter link canal is a 30 km (19 mi) long gravity canal planned to inter link the Vamsadhara and Nagavali Rivers. It will run from Hiramandalam reservoir to Narayanapuram barrage near Amudalavalasa and bring an additional 50,000 acres (20,000 ha) of ayacut under irrigation using 10 tmcft of water from Vamsadhara basin.

== Pumped storage hydropower projects ==
Nearly 9200 MW capacity pumped-storage hydropower plants could be installed using the existing reservoirs to meet the renewable power needs of the Uttara Andhra region.

== See also ==
- Vamsadhara River
- Krishna Water Disputes Tribunal
- Polavaram Project
- Sriram Sagar Project
- Nizam Sagar
- Balimela Reservoir
- Penner River
- Palar River
