= Sangam, Vizianagaram district =

Sangam
- Village
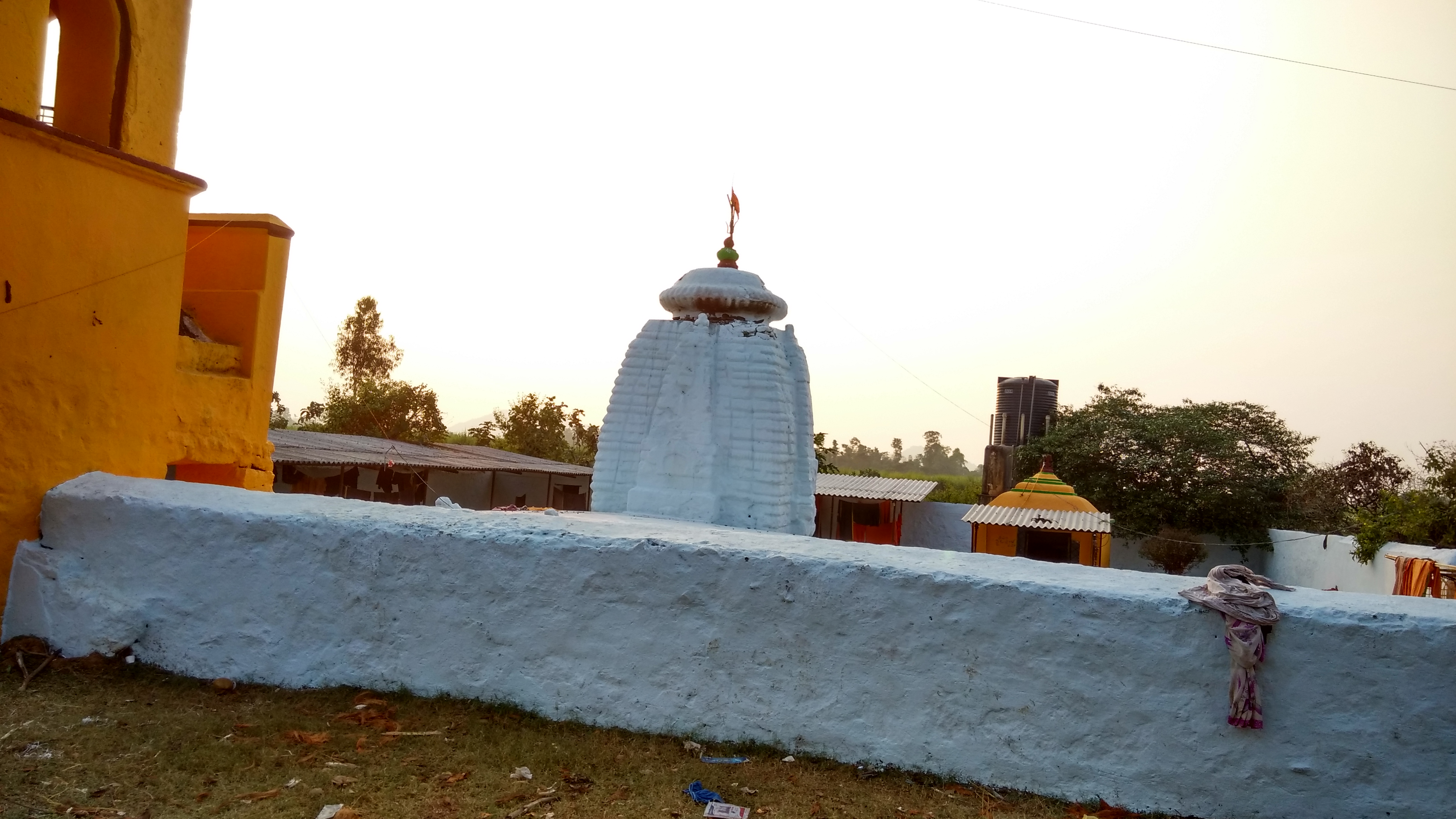
- Sangameswara Temple
- Interactive map of Sangam
- Location in Andhra Pradesh, India
- Coordinates: 18°35′59″N 83°38′09″E
- Country: India
- State: Andhra Pradesh
- District: Vizianagaram

Languages
  - Official: Telugu
- Time zone: UTC+5:30 (IST)
- Vehicle Registration: AP30 (Former); AP39 (from 30 January 2019)
- Nearest city: Rajam

Sangam is a village and a pilgrimage site in Vangara mandal in Vizianagaram district in the state of Andhra Pradesh, India. Sangam is a village and a pilgrimage site

It is about 56 kilometers from Srikakulam Town and 20 kilometers from Rajam.

== Religious Importance ==
Nagavali, Suvarnamukhi and Vegavati rivers confluence (join together) takes place here and hence it is referred as Triveni Sangam.

The idol of Lord Sangameswara, another name for Lord Shiva, was here installed (vigraha pratista) by Balaram, the brother of Lord SriKrishna. This is one of the five 'Linga Kshetras'. Thousands of devotees gather here on Maha Shivaratri festival every year.
