= Parannavalasa =

Coordinates: 18°32′N 83°15′E

- village
- Interactive map of Parannavalasa
- Country: India
- State: Andhra Pradesh

Population (2001)
  - Total: 466

Languages
  - Official: Telugu
- Time zone: UTC+5:30 (IST)

Chinna Parannavalasa and Peda Parannavalasa are two villages separated by the Vegavathi River in Salur mandal, Parvathipuram Manyam district of Andhra Pradesh, India. They are administered by a single gram panchayat named Parannavalasa.

There is a railway station at Parannavalasa in the Salur-Bobbili branch railway line. The PIN code of the village is 213110.

== Demographics ==
According to Indian census, 2001, the demographic details of Parannavalasa village is as follows:

- Total Population: 466 in 103 Households
- Male Population: 240 and Female Population: 226
- Children Under 6-years of age: 59 (Boys - 31 and Girls - 28)
- Total Literates: 254
