= Krishnapuram, Vizianagaram district =

Krishnapuram
- village
- Interactive map of Krishnapuram
- Location in Andhra Pradesh, India
- Country: India
- State: Andhra Pradesh
- District: Vizianagaram district

Languages
  - Official: Telugu
- Time zone: UTC+5:30 (IST)
- Nearest cities: Bobbili, Vizianagaram and Salur

Krishnapuram is a village in Dattirajeru mandal in the Vizianagaram district of Andhra Pradesh, India. It has a population of 2,160 people.

== See also ==
- Bobbili mandal
