= Visakhapatnam Airport =

Visakhapatnam Airport may refer to:

- Alluri Sitarama Raju International Airport, located at Bhogapuram and the main commercial airport serving Visakhapatnam airport
- INS Dega, an Indian Navy base, which houses a civil enclave and previously served as the main commercial airport of Visakhapatnam
