= Oneness Organisation =

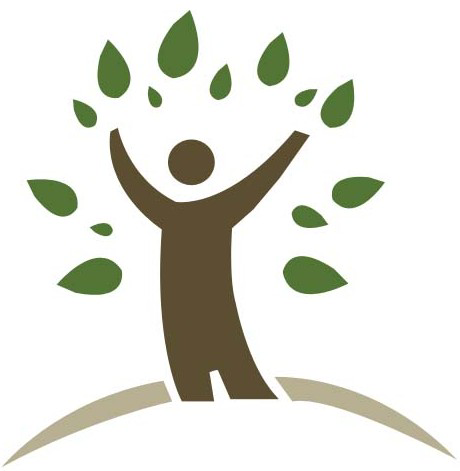
Logo of Oneness Organisation

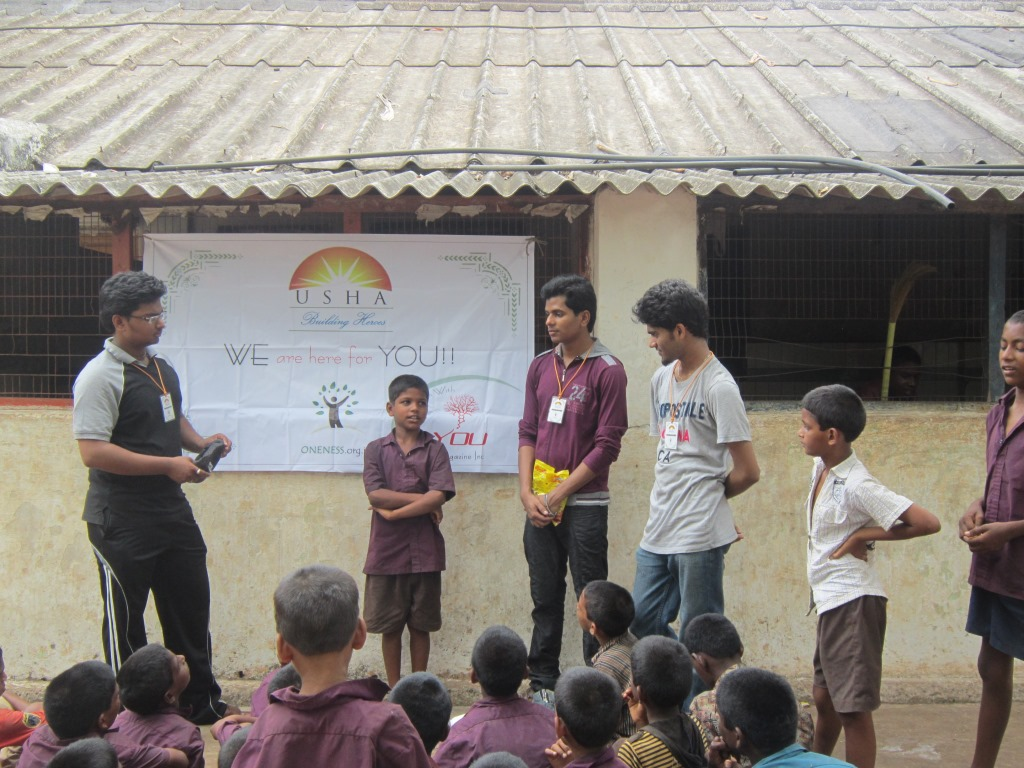
Project USHA

Oneness Organisation is a non-profit organisation founded in 2008 in Andhra Pradesh, India. Initially, it worked to improve the quality of education in rural areas. In 2009, the organisation began working on widespread issues that include medical projects, sanitation projects, youth development programs, and motivation projects.

== History ==
The organisation was founded by Kundhan Karunakar. Oneness Organisation is registered in Andhra Pradesh, and its operation is spread across Visakhapatnam, Vizianagaram, Srikakulam, Rajam, Hyderabad, Ahmedabad and Lucknow.
