= Vangara, Vizianagaram district =

Vangara
- Village
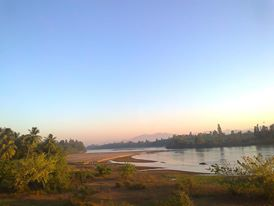
- Nagavali River at Chinna Rajulagumada village of Vangara mandal
- Interactive map of Vangara
- Location within Andhra Pradesh Location within India
- Coordinates: 18.617°N 83.609°E
- Country: India
- State: Andhra Pradesh
- District: Vizianagaram
- Talukas: Vangara
- Elevation: 132 m (433 ft)

Population (2001)
  - Total: 1,653

Languages
  - Official: Telugu
- Time zone: UTC+5:30 (IST)
- Vehicle Registration: AP30 (Former); AP39 (from 30 January 2019)
- Nearest city: Rajam

Vangara is a village in Vangara mandal in Vizianagaram district of the Indian state of Andhra Pradesh. It is located in Vangara mandal of Palakonda revenue division.

== Demographics ==
Telugu is spoken here. The population is 1,653—824 males and 829 females in 355 dwellings. The area is 248 hectares (610 acres).
