= Rompilli =

- village
- Interactive map of Rompilli
- Location in Andhra Pradesh, India
- Country: India
- State: Andhra Pradesh

Languages
  - Official: Telugu
- Time zone: UTC+5:30 (IST)
- Postal code: 535579
- Vehicle registration: AP

Rompilli or Rompalli or Rompalle is a village and panchayat in Ramabhadrapuram mandal of Vizianagaram district, Andhra Pradesh, India.

There is a railway station at Rompilli in the branch railway line between Salur and Bobbili. Daily rail bus services are operated between these stations.

In the 2011 census it had a population of 2625 in 663 households.
