= Bobbili mandal =

- Mandal
- Interactive map of Bobbili mandal
- Location in Andhra Pradesh, India
- Coordinates: 18.5667°N 83.3667°E
- Country: India
- State: Andhra Pradesh
- District: Vizianagaram
- Headquarters: Bobbili

Population (2011)
  - Total: 240,031

Languages
  - Official: Telugu
- Time zone: UTC+5:30 (IST)

Bobbili is one of the 34 mandals in Vizianagaram district of Andhra Pradesh, India. Bobbili town is the headquarters of the mandal. The mandal is bounded by Makkuva, Seethanagaram, Balajipeta, Salur, Ramabhadrapuram, Badangi and Therlam mandals.

== Demographics ==
As of 2011 census, the mandal had a population of 122,964. The total population constitute, 61,092 males and 61,872 females —a sex ratio of 1013 females per 1000 males. 12,369 children are in the age group of 0–6 years, of which 6,383 are boys and 5,984 are girls —a ratio of 938 per 1000. The average literacy rate stands at 63.99% with 70,768 literates.

== Government and politics ==
Bobbili mandal is one of the mandal in Bobbili (Assembly constituency), which in turn is a part of Vizianagaram (Lok Sabha constituency), one of the 25 Lok Sabha constituencies representing Andhra Pradesh. The present MLA is Venkata Sujay Krishna Ranga Rao Ravu, who won the Andhra Pradesh Legislative Assembly election, 2014 representing YSRCP. Bobbili was a Lok Sabha constituency till 2008.

== Towns and villages ==
Bobbili is a municipal town in the mandal. Alajangi is the most populated and Vakadavalasa is the least populated village in the mandal. As of 2011 census, the mandal has 9 settlements, that includes:

1. Alajangi
2. Bankuruvalasa
3. Bhojarajupuram
4. M Boorjavalasa (Near) Bobbili
5. Chintada
6. Chitrakota Boddavalasa
7. Donguruvalasa
8. Gopalarayudupeta
9. Gorla Seetharampuram
10. Gunnathotavalasa
11. Jagannadhapuram
12. Janardhana Ranga Rayapuram @ Kintalavanipet
13. Janardhanarangarayapuram @ Kunukuvanivalasa
14. Kalavarai Agraharam
15. Kammavalasa
16. Karada
17. Kasidoravalasa
18. Komatipalle (Near) Bobbili
19. Kondadevupalle
20. Krishnapuram
21. Lingamvalasa
22. Mettavalasa
23. Muttavalasa
24. Narayanappavalasa- REDDI SURESH
25. Nimmalapadu
26. Pakki
27. Panukuvalasa (Near) Mettavalasa
28. Paradhi
29. Patha Bobbili (Rural)
30. Pent
31. Piridi
32. Rajupeta
33. Ramuduvalasa
34. Rangarayapuram
35. Seethayyapeta
36. Sivadavalasa
37. Vakadavalasa
38. Velagavalasa (Near) Addumanda

== See also ==
- Bobbili
- Vizianagaram district Ramabhadrapuram
