= Ramabhadrapuram mandal =

- Mandal
- Interactive Map Outlining mandal
- Location in Andhra Pradesh, India
- Coordinates: 18.5000°N 83.2833°E
- Country: India
- State: Andhra Pradesh
- District: Vizianagaram
- Headquarters: Ramabhadrapuram

Population (2011)
  - Total: 47,723

Languages
  - Official: Telugu
- Time zone: UTC+5:30 (IST)

Ramabhadrapuram mandal is one of the 34 mandals in Vizianagaram district of Andhra Pradesh, India. Ramabhadrapuram is the headquarters of the mandal. The mandal is bounded by Salur, Bobbili, Badangi, Merakamudidam, Dattirajeru, Mentada and Pachipenta mandals.

== Demographics ==
As of 2011 census, the mandal had a population of 47,723. The total population constitute, 23,666 males and 24,057 females. The entire population is rural in nature.

== Government and politics ==
Ramabhadrapuram mandal is one of the four mandals in Bobbili (Assembly constituency), which in turn is a part of Vizianagaram (Lok Sabha constituency), one of the 25 Lok Sabha constituencies representing Andhra Pradesh. The present MLA is Venkata Sujay Krishna Ranga Rao Ravu, who won the Andhra Pradesh Legislative Assembly election, 2014 representing Yuvajana Sramika Rythu Congress Party.

== Rural villages ==
As of 2011 2011 census of India, the mandal has 31 settlements, consisting of 31 villages. Ramabhadrapuram is the most populated and Mulachelagam is the least populated village in the mandal.

The settlements in the mandal are listed below:

1. Appalarajupeta
2. Arikatota
3. Busayavalasa
4. Chandapuram
5. Chintalavalasa
6. Duppalapudi
7. Enubaruvu
8. Gollapeta
9. Itlamamidipalle
10. Jannivalasa
11. Kondakenguva
12. Kondapalavalasa
13. Kotasirlam
14. Kottakki
15. Lollarapadu
16. Mamidivalasa
17. marrivalasa
18. Mulachelagam
19. Mutcherlavalasa
20. Naiduvalasa
21. Narasapuram
22. Patarega
23. Pedachelagam
24. Ramabhadrapuram
25. Ravivalasa
26. Rompalle
27. Rompallivalasa
28. Samarthula Chintalavalasa
29. Seetharampuram
30. Sompuram
31. Tarapuram
