= Madduvalasa =

- Village
- Interactive map of Madduvalasa
- Location in Andhra Pradesh, India Madduvalasa (India)
- Coordinates: 18.6013°N 83.5925°E
- Country: India
- State: Andhra Pradesh
- District: Vizianagaram
- Talukas: Vangara

Languages
  - Official: Telugu
- Time zone: UTC+5:30 (IST)
- PIN: 532122
- Nearest city: Rajam

Madduvalasa is a village in Vangara mandal of Vizianagaram district, Andhra Pradesh, India. The villagers speak the Telugu language.

== Demographics ==
The total population of Madduvalasa is 600 (325 males and 275 females), living in 133 houses. The total area of Madduvalasa is 148 hectares (370 acres).

== Madduvalasa Reservoir ==
Madduvalasa Reservoir has been built on the Vegavati and Suvarnamukhi rivers, subsidiaries of the Nagavali River at Madduvalasa. It was commissioned in 1977 and completed in 2002. About 23,000 acres (9,300 ha) of land was brought under cultivation with the water.

The seven villages of Patuvardhanam, Devikiwada, Chinna Devikiwada, CBR Peta, Nukalavada, Narendrapuram and Gitanapalli, comprising about 2,240 families, were adjacent to the Full Reservoir Level (FRL). They were identified for a rehabilitation package involving an expenditure of ₹ 270 million.
