= Badangi mandal =

- Mandal
- Interactive map of Badangi mandal
- Location in Andhra Pradesh, India
- Coordinates: 18.4956°N 83.3682°E
- Country: India
- State: Andhra Pradesh
- District: Vizianagaram
- Headquarters: Badangi

Population (2011)
  - Total: 48,219

Languages
  - Official: Telugu
- Time zone: UTC+5:30 (IST)

Badangi mandal is one of the 34 mandals in Vizianagaram district of Andhra Pradesh, India. Badangi is the headquarters of the mandal.

The mandal is bounded by Bobbili, Therlam, Merakamudidam and Ramabhadrapuram mandals.

== Demographics ==
As of 2011 census, the mandal had a population of 48,219. The total population constitute, 24,357 males and 23,862 females. The entire population is rural in nature.

== Government and politics ==
Badangi mandal is one of the four mandals in Bobbili (Assembly constituency), which in turn is a part of Vizianagaram (Lok Sabha constituency), one of the 25 Lok Sabha constituencies representing Andhra Pradesh. The present MLA is Sambangi Venkata China Appala Naidu, who won the Andhra Pradesh Legislative Assembly election, 2019 representing Yuvajana Sramika Rythu Congress Party.

== Rural villages ==
As of 2011 2011 census of India, the mandal has 27 settlements, consisting of 27 villages. Koduru is the most populated and D. Venkayyapeta is the least populated village in the mandal.

The settlements in the mandal are listed below:

1. Akulakatta
2. Anavaram
3. Badangi
4. Bheemavaram
5. D.Venkayyapeta
6. Donkinivalasa
7. Gajarayunivalasa
8. Golladi
9. Gopalakrishnarangarayapuram
10. Gudepuvalasa
11. Kamannavalasa
12. Koduru
13. Kotipalle
14. Lakshmipuram
15. Mallampeta
16. Mugada
17. P.Venkampeta
18. Paltheru
19. Pedapalle
20. Pinapenki
21. Pindrangivalasa
22. Pudivalasa
23. Ramachandra Puram
24. Rejeru
25. Tentuvalasa
26. Vadada
27. Veerasagaram
