= Pogiri =

Coordinates: 18°24′N 83°42′E

- village
- Interactive map of Pogiri
- Country: India
- State: Andhra Pradesh
- District: Srikakulam

Languages
  - Official: Telugu
- Time zone: UTC+5:30 (IST)
- PIN: 532148
- Telephone code: 08941
- Vehicle registration: AP
- Nearest city: Rajam
- Vidhan Sabha constituency: Rajam

Pogiri is a village and panchayat in Rajam mandal of vizianagaram district, Andhra Pradesh, India.
