= Ramachandra puram =

- village
- Interactive map of Ramachandra puram
- Location in Andhra Pradesh, India Ramachandra puram (India)
- Coordinates: 18.484444°N 83.401389°E
- Country: India
- State: Andhra Pradesh
- District: Vizianagaram

Languages
  - Official: Telugu
- Time zone: UTC+5:30 (IST)
- PIN: 535 578
- Vehicle registration: AP35

Ramachandra puram is a village in Badangi mandal of Vizianagaram district, Andhra Pradesh, India. It is located on the connecting road between Ramabhadrapuram (National Highway 43) and Chilakapalem (National Highway 5). It is about 50 km from Vizianagaram city and 4 km from Badangi.

== Demographics ==
Ramachandra Puram is a small village located in Badangi of Vizianagaram district, Andhra Pradesh with total 210 families residing. The Ramachandra Puram village has population of 861 of which 432 are males while 429 are females as per 2011 Indian census

In Ramachandra Puram village population of children with age 0-6 is 89 which makes up 10.34% of total population of village. Average Sex Ratio of Ramachandra Puram village is 993 which is equal to Andhra Pradesh state average of 993. Child Sex Ratio for the Ramachandra Puram as per census is 780, lower than Andhra Pradesh average of 939.

Ramachandra Puram village has lower literacy rate compared to Andhra Pradesh. In 2011, literacy rate of Ramachandra Puram village was 62.69% compared to 67.02% of Andhra Pradesh. In Ramachandra Puram Male literacy stands at 75.39% while female literacy rate was 50.26%.
