= Pachipenta mandal =

- Mandal
- Interactive map outlining mandal
- Location in Andhra Pradesh, India
- Coordinates: 18.46°N 83.11°E
- Country: India
- State: Andhra Pradesh
- District: Parvathipuram Manyam
- Headquarters: Pachipenta

Government
  - Body: Mandal Parishad

Population (2011)
  - Total: 43,975

Languages
  - Official: Telugu
- Time zone: UTC+5:30 (IST)

Pachipenta mandal is one of the 34 mandals in Parvathipuram Manyam district of the Indian state of Andhra Pradesh. It is administration under Parvathipuram revenue division and headquartered at Pachipenta. The mandal is bounded by Salur, Ramabhadrapuram and Mentada mandals. A portion of it also borders the state of Odisha.

== Demographics ==
As of 2011 census, the mandal had a population of 43,975. The total population constitute, 22,186 males and 21,789 females. The entire population is rural in nature.

== Government and politics ==
Pachipenta mandal is one of the four mandals in Salur (Assembly constituency), which in turn is a part of Araku (Lok Sabha constituency), one of the 25 Lok Sabha constituencies representing Andhra Pradesh. The present MLA is Rajanna Dora Peedika, who won the Andhra Pradesh Legislative Assembly election, 2014 representing YSR Congress Party.

== Rural villages ==
As of 2011 2011 census of India, the mandal has 52 settlements, consisting of 52 villages.

The settlements in the mandal are listed below:

1. Adaripadu
2. Ajuru
3. Aluru
4. Bobbilivalasa
5. Borramamidi
6. Chakirevuvalasa
7. Cherukupalle
8. Chittelaba
9. Chittipuram
10. Garellavalasa
11. Garlavalasa
12. Gavarampeta
13. Gotturu
14. Guruvinaidupeta
15. Kankanapalle
16. Karrivalasa
17. Katarikota
18. Kerangi
19. Kesali
20. Kondaluddandi
21. Kondamosuru
22. Kondataduru
23. Kotikipenta
24. Kottavalasa
25. Kudumuru
26. Kumbivalasa
27. Kunambandavalasa
28. Kuntambadevalasa
29. Mathumuru
30. Meliakanchuru
31. Mirthivalasa
32. Moduga
33. Mosuru
34. Nanda
35. Pachipenta
36. Padmapuram
37. Panasapeddikona Valasa(Syamala Gowri Puram village part)
38. Panchali
39. Panukuvalasa
40. Parthapuram
41. Pedakanchuru
42. Peddavalasa
43. Pudi
44. Saraivalasa
45. Sathabi
46. Taduru
47. Tangalam
48. Tumaravilli
49. Turaipadu
50. Vetaganivalasa
51. Viswanadhapuram
