= Kottakki =

- Village
- Interactive map of Kottakki
- Location in Andhra Pradesh, India Kottakki (India)
- Coordinates: 18.5149°N 83.2353°E
- Country: India
- State: Andhra Pradesh
- District: Vizianagaram

Languages
  - Official: Telugu
- Time zone: UTC+5:30 (IST)
- PIN: 535579
- Vehicle registration: AP–35

Kottakki is a village in Vizianagaram district of the Indian state of Andhra Pradesh. It is located in Ramabhadrapuram mandal. The village has nearly 1500 homes and a population of 3500 people, the majority of which are Hindu. Kottakki has several temples (Sivalayam, Ramalayam, and Saibaba Alayam), a mosque, two churches, and the local idols Kottamma, Bangaramma, and Yernamma. It is a major Panchait and has the third highest population in its mandal. Its constituency was Bobbili and under Salur circle and pravathipuram division. It is closer to Salur (4 km) than its mandal Ramabhadrapuram (4.5 km). The village has three cell towers (BSNL, AIRTEL, and RELIANCE). Since 1987, the village has schools up to the 10th class. The local economy is largely dependent on farming.
