= Chintada =

- village
- Interactive map of Chintada
- Location in Andhra Pradesh, India Chintada (India)
- Coordinates: 18.6271159°N 83.7159285°E
- Country: India
- State: Andhra Pradesh
- District: Vizianagaram

Population (2011)<ref> https://censusindia.gov.in</ref>
  - Total: 4,523

Languages
  - Official: Telugu
- Time zone: UTC+5:30 (IST)
- Postal code: 535558
- Vehicle registration: AP-35

Chintada is a village located in Bobbili mandal of the Vizianagaram district, Andhra Pradesh state in India.

== Demographics ==
As of 2011 the Indian census, the demographic details of Chintada village are as follows:

- Total Population: 4,523 in 1,154 Households
- Male Population: 2,302 and Female Population: 2,221
- Children Under 6-years of age: 413 (Boys - 228 and Girls - 185)
- Total Literates: 2,375

== Education ==
There is a Zilla Parishad High School in the village.

== See also ==
- Bobbili mandal
