= Piridi =

- village
- Interactive map of Piridi
- Location in Andhra Pradesh, India
- Coordinates: 18°34′N 83°25′E
- Country: India
- State: Andhra Pradesh
- District: Vizianagaram

Government
  - Type: Panchayat raj
  - Body: Gram panchayat

Languages
  - Official: Telugu
- Time zone: UTC+5:30 (IST)
- PIN: 535568
- Vehicle registration: AP-35
- Nearest city: Bobbili
- Lok Sabha constituency: Vizianagaram
- Vidhan Sabha constituency: Bobbili

Piridi is a Major Panchayat village in Bobbili mandal of Vizianagaram District in Andhra Pradesh, India.

== Demographics ==
As of 2001 Indian census, the demographic details of this village is as follows:

- Total Population: 5,366 in 1,313 Households.
- Male Population: 2,710
- Female Population: 2,656
- Children Under 6-years of age: 551 (Boys - 268 and Girls - 283)
- Total Literates: 2,363
