= Sivadavalasa =

- village
- Interactive map of Sivadavalasa
- Location in Andhra Pradesh, India Sivadavalasa (India)
- Coordinates: 18.5756466°N 83.4670189°E
- Country: India
- State: Andhra Pradesh

Population (2014)
  - Total: 1,600

Languages
  - Official: Telugu
- Time zone: UTC+5:30 (IST)
- Postal code: 535568
- Vehicle registration: AP

Sivadavalasa is a village and panchayat in Bobbili mandal, Vizianagaram district of Andhra Pradesh, India.

== See also ==
- Bobbili mandal
