= Chinna Rajulagumada =

- Village
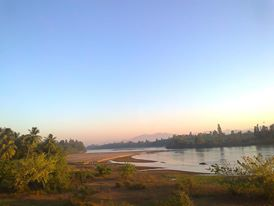
- Nagavali River beside Chinna Rajulagumada Village
- Interactive map of Chinna Rajulagumada
- Coordinates: 18°42′N 83°36′E
- Country: India
- State: Andhra Pradesh
- District: Vizianagaram

Government
  - Body: Panchayat Raj

Area
  - Total: 6.23 km^{2} (2.41 sq mi)
- Elevation: 132 m (433 ft)

Population (2011)
  - Total: 1,615
  - Density: 259/km^{2} (671/sq mi)

Languages
  - Official: Telugu
- Time zone: UTC+5:30 (IST)
- PIN: 532 461
- Nearest city: Parvathipuram

Chinna Rajulagumada is a village located in Vangara mandal of Vizianagaram district in State of Andhra Pradesh. This village belongs to Palakonda revenue division.
