= Grandhi Mallikarjuna Rao =

Indian industrialist

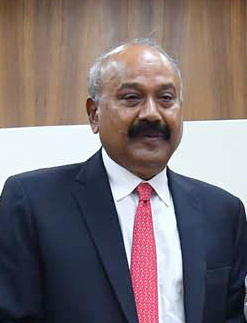
- Born: 14 July 1950 (age 76); Rajam, Andhra Pradesh, India
- Occupations: Founder & Chairman of GMR Group
- Spouse: Grandhi Varalakshmi
- Website: www.gmrgroup.in/group-holdings-detail/

Grandhi Mallikarjuna Rao (born 14 July 1950) is an Indian mechanical engineer, philanthropist, and industrialist. He is the founder chairman of GMR Group, a global infrastructure developer and operator based in India. The GMR Group, started in 1978, is active in the energy, highways, urban development, and airport sectors, and is known for building and operating world-class national assets, including major airports like Delhi's Indira Gandhi International Airport and Hyderabad's Rajiv Gandhi International Airport. He also co-owns the IPL team Delhi Capitals. Rao is one of the richest people in India and in the world, having been listed by Forbes. His GMR Group is considered the leading airport developer in India by revenue, asset size, and market capitalisation.

== Early life and education ==
Grandhi Mallikarjuna Rao was born on 14 July 1950, in a Telugu family in Rajam, Srikakulam district, Andhra Pradesh, India. He was born in an upper-middle-class family whose main business interests involved commodities trading and a small-scale jewellery business started by his father in Rajam. After graduating from Andhra University, Rao joined a paper mill as a shift engineer and then joined the Public Works Department of the Andhra Pradesh Government as a junior engineer.

== Career ==
Rao soon entered the trading of commodities at the insistence of his mother. After developing strong relationships with suppliers and customers, he successfully acquired a failing jute mill at a bargain price. This venture proved lucrative and allowed Rao to leverage capital from local banks to acquire other assets. He eventually divested his stake in a multitude of industries and, in 1987, started the private sector bank, Vysya Bank, in collaboration with ING.

Rao later diluted his stake in ING Vysya, selling his entire share for ₹3.4 billion (US$69.96 million). The capital generated from the bank stake sale enabled his entry into the power and infrastructure sectors, laying the foundation for the GMR Group.

== GMR Group and Infrastructure Leadership ==
The GMR Group is a diversified infrastructure conglomerate with operations in 7 countries. The company's focus on building and operating large-scale, world-class national assets, particularly airports, cemented its leadership position. The GMR Group is significantly larger than its nearest competitor, GVK, by market capitalisation, establishing it as India's foremost airport developer by revenue and asset size.

In 2014, Rao was appointed as the chairman of the Andhra Pradesh Skill Development Corporation, with government plans to invest ₹7 billion (equivalent to ₹11 billion or US$120 million in 2023) to train approximately 20 million people over 10 years.

== Awards ==
GM Rao received the Economic Times Entrepreneur of the year Award in 2007.

== Philanthropy ==
Rao is known for his commitment to charitable causes, stating that Warren Buffett was an inspiration for his pledge to 'give back to society'. In 2012, he donated ₹15.4 billion (equivalent to ₹29 billion or US$300 million in 2023) for charitable purposes.

The GMR Varalakshmi Foundation (GMRVF) serves as the Corporate Social Responsibility arm of the GMR Group. GMRVF is a non-profit (Section 25) company governed by Rao, which focuses on developing social infrastructure and enhancing the quality of life in underserved communities across the 22 locations where the Group maintains a presence.
