= Arikathota =

- Village
- Interactive map of Arikathota
- Location in Andhra Pradesh, India Arikathota (India)
- Coordinates: 18.4609°N 83.3154°E
- Country: India
- State: Andhra Pradesh
- District: Vizianagaram

Population (2011)
  - Total: 5,000

Languages
  - Official: Telugu
- Time zone: UTC+5:30 (IST)
- Vehicle registration: AP–35

Arikathota is a village in Ramabhadrapuram mandal, Vizianagaram district, Andhra Pradesh, India.
