= Hatipathar, Rayagada =

Coordinates: 19.358006°N 83.506859°E

Hatipathar, Rayagada (Odisha)

Hatipathar is a natural tourist site located in the Rayagada district in the Indian state of Odisha. It lies approximately 3 kilometres from the town of Rayagada, on the banks of the Nagavali River.

The name of 'Hatipathar' is derived from the Odia words hati (elephant) and pathar (rock), referring to two large boulders in the area that resemble elephants.

Hatipathar has been included in archived official records of tourist attractions published by the Odisha Tourism Department.

The Majhighariani Temple, a local religious site, is located approximately 2 kilometres from Hatipathar.
