= Donkinavalasa =

- village
- Interactive map of Donkinavalasa
- Location in Andhra Pradesh, India Donkinavalasa (India)
- Coordinates: 18°28′59″N 83°21′10″E
- Country: India
- State: Andhra Pradesh
- District: Vizianagaram

Population (2001)
  - Total: 1,034

Languages
  - Official: Telugu
- Time zone: UTC+5:30 (IST)
- PIN: 535578
- Vehicle registration: AP-35
- Nearest city: Bobbili

Donkinavalasa is a village and panchayat in Badangi mandal of Vizianagaram district, Andhra Pradesh, India. It is located about 42 km from Vizianagaram city. There is a railway station in the Vizianagaram-Raipur section of East Coast Railway, Indian Railways.

== Demographics ==
As of 2001 Indian census, the demographic details of this village is as follows:

- Total Population: 1,034 in 251 Households
- Male Population: 482
- Female Population: 552
- Children Under 6-years of age: 106 (Boys - 48 and Girls - 58)
- Total Literates: 432
