= Thotapalli Barrage =

Dam in Andhra Pradesh, south-east India

- Location within Andhra Pradesh
- Reservoir and the canal network Interactive map of Thotapalli Barrage
- Official name: సర్దార్ గౌతు లచ్చన్న తో‌‌టపల్లి బ్యారేజి Sardar Gouthu Latchanna Thotapalli Barrage सर्दार् गौतु लच्चन्न तोटपल्लि बांध
- Country: India
- Location: Parvathipuram Manyam district, Andhra Pradesh
- Coordinates: 18°47′5″N 83°29′47″E
- Construction began: 10 September 2003
- Opening date: 10 September 2015
- Construction cost: 775 crore rupees

Dam and spillways
- Impounds: Nagavali River
- Height: 20.20 metres (66 ft) from river level
- Length: 8,200 metres (26,903 ft)
- Width (base): 6 metres (20 ft)

Reservoir
- Creates: Sardar Gouthu Latchanna Thotapalli Barrage
- Total capacity: 2.51 Tmcft
- Catchment area: 4,455 square kilometres (1,720 sq mi)

Thotapalli Barrage is located in Garugubilli Mandal, Parvathipuram Manyam district of Andhra Pradesh State. It was named after the freedom fighter and political leader Gouthu Latchanna. The bridge was built in between 2003 and 2015. It was inaugurated by Andhra Pradesh Chief Minister N. Chandrababu Naidu on 10 September 2015. The Project provides irrigation to 1,20,000 acres in Parvathipuram Manyam , Srikakulam and Vizianagaram districts.

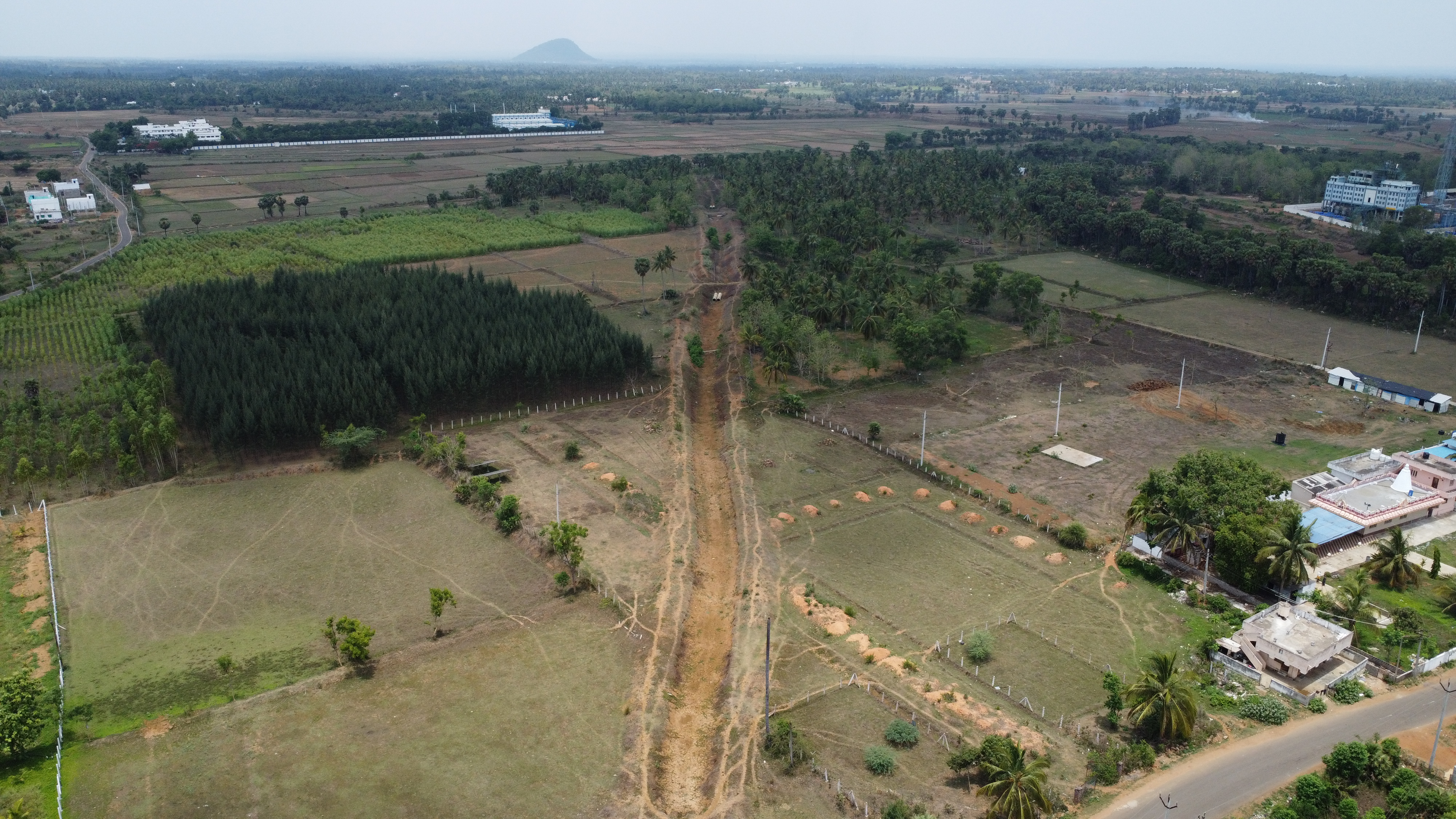
A link canal of Thotapalli Vizianagaram Branch Canal near Govindapuram, Pusapatirega.

In 1908, the old Thotapalli regulator was constructed across the Nagavali River with a 64,000 acres irrigation potential. The regulator was replaced by the current barrage which has a 2.51 Tmcft storage capacity and an additional 56,000 acres irrigation potential.

== See also ==
- List of dams and reservoirs in India
- Andhra Pradesh
