= Vikram Dev III =

Maharajah of Jeypore from 1895–1920

Maharajah Sir Vikram Dev III Bahadur KCIE KECM KGCM DD
- 23rd Maharajah of Jeypore
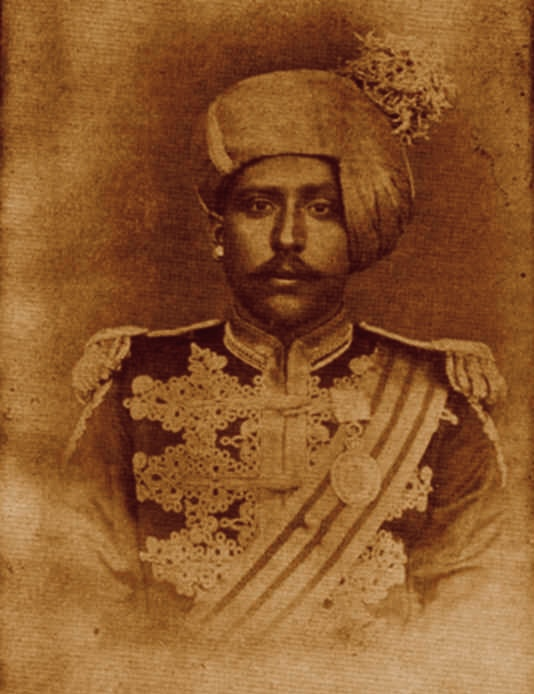
- Vikram Dev III

Maharajah of Jeypore
- Reign: 27 November 1895 – 18 August 1920
- Predecessor: Ram Chandra Dev III
- Successor: Ram Chandra Dev IV
- Ministers: Dewan P. Venkannah Pantulu
- Born: 6 December 1874; Surya Mahal Palace Jeypore
- Died: 18 August 1920 (aged 45); Moti Mahal Palace Jeypore
- Spouse: Sita Devi Rajeshwari
- Issue: Ram Chandra Dev IV, Padmavathi Devi
- Dynasty: Suryavansh
- Father: Ram Chandra Dev III
- Mother: Lakshmi Devi Rajeshwari
- Religion: Hinduism

Maharajah Sir Vikram Dev III KCIE or Vikram Dev was the king of Jeypore, Kalinga, from 1889 to 1920. He is well known for his administration, altruism, education reforms, tribal welfare, and various construction works that developed the kingdom of Jeypore.

== Early life ==
Vikram Dev III was born to Maharajah Ramachandra Dev III and Maharani Lakshmi Devi Rajeshwari on 6 December 1874. He was the only son and, therefore, the heir apparent to the throne. His sister Rajkumari Subardna Devi was married to Raja Goura Chandra Gajapati of Paralakhemundi.

After the death of his father in 1889, the estate went under the management of the Court of Wards, who also took keen interest in the education of the young crown prince. A British gentleman, J.S. Marsh, was appointed as the tutor of Vikram Dev, who tutored him in the subjects of English, Humanities, and Law. Before his coronation, the prince travelled with Marsh to Madras, where he had the opportunity to formally meet and converse with puissant personalities like Lord Elgin – the then Viceroy of India, and Lord Wenlock – the Governor of Madras. He was married to Princess Sita Devi, daughter of Raja Dharamjeet Singh Deo of Udaipur State in Chhattisgarh.

== Reign ==
Vikram Dev ascended the throne on 27 November 1895 after the expiration of his minority. Essentially, he became the first king of the dynasty to build a good rapport with the British Raj, unlike his ancestors who kept a rancorous approach due to the contentious history between the British and Jeypore. The young king aspired to develop his kingdom and improve the livelihood of his people, which seemed possible only with the support of the British, who governed India with the help of numerous princely states and Estates. He led the construction of a new palace called ‘Moti Mahal’ and new robust bridges upon the regional rivers Kolab and Indravati. This also proved to be an economic merit for the local population as it provided them employment.

Apparently, the liberal king donated considerable amounts for the construction of Victoria Memorial in Kolkata and to Victoria Caste and Ghosh Hospital. He also donated to the Indian famine of 1899–1900 Relief Fund and to the Transval War Fund. His education proved vital in improving the status of his kingdom, and he was formally awarded the title of "Maharajah" by the British, although it was used "informally" by his ancestors. He also received the distinction of a Knight Commander (KCIE) under the Order of the Indian Empire, along with the style of ‘Highness’ conferred upon him and his descendants. In 1901, he was invited to Madras by Lord Curzon, the then Viceroy of India, and Sir Arthur Havelock, Governor of Madras.

=== Expansion of territories ===
When Vikram Dev took up the mantle, the territories of Jeypore Samasthanam measured at 12,000 square miles. However, the king further expanded the dominion of his kingdom by purchasing the zamindaris of Pachipenta and Madugula in the year 1910, and henceforth, the limits of the kingdom were extended down to the Ghat near Itikavalsa. However, half of the Madugula zamindari was retained by the Estate Queen and was relinquished by her in 1928 after a court order ruled in favour of Maharajah Ram Chandra Dev IV. Due to these administrative measures, the territories of Jeypore were expanded to 15,000 square miles.

=== Contribution in the First World War ===
Sir Vikram Dev provided essential financial aid to the British in the First World War. He donated an amount of one lakh Indian rupees to the First World War Fund and a thousand rupees every month till the end of the war. His only son Prince Ramchandra Dev IV was awarded the rank of a Lieutenant. He also contributed 25,000 for a fighter plane to be named after Jeypore. Apparently, keeping these aids in regard, the British government named a street in London, ‘Jeypore Road’.

== Death and legacy ==
Vikram Dev III died in 1920 at the age of 46 and was succeeded by his only son Maharajah Ram Chandra Dev IV. In 1926, the then governor of Madras, Viscount George Goschen, along with the Lady Viscount, inaugurated the statue of Maharajah Vikram Dev III in the premises of Surya Mahal Palace.
