= Koduru, Vizianagaram district =

Koduru
- Village
- Interactive map of Koduru
- Location in Andhra Pradesh, India
- Country: India
- State: Andhra Pradesh
- District: Vizianagaram

Population (2001)
  - Total: 5,714

Languages
  - Official: Telugu
- Time zone: UTC+5:30 (IST)
- Climate: hot (Köppen)

Koduru is a village in Badangi mandal of Vizianagaram district, Andhra Pradesh, India.

== Demographics ==
As of 2001 Indian census, Koduru has a population of 5,714; among them males consists of 2,865 and females 2,849.
