= Narayanappavalasa =

Coordinates: 18°33′N 83°18′E

- village
- Interactive map of Narayanappavalasa
- Country: India
- State: Andhra Pradesh
- District: Vizianagaram

Languages
  - Official: Telugu
- Time zone: UTC+5:30 (IST)

Narayanappavalasa is a village and panchayat in Bobbili mandal, Vizianagaram district of Andhra Pradesh, India. There is a railway station at Narayanappavalasa on the Bobbili-Salur branch railway line.

As of the 2011 census, It has a total population of 732 people, living in 190 households. It has a single primary school.
