= Busayavalasa =

Coordinates: 18°29′N 83°17′E

Busayavalasa is a village in Vizianagaram district, Andhra Pradesh, India. It is situated in Ramabhadrapuram mandal about 45 km from Vizianagaram city on the National Highway 43. Shree Kalyana Venkateshwara Swamy temple is the major attraction of this village. Another village named Mutcherlavalasa, also a panchayat, is located besides Busayavalasa and both villages are located combindly without any boundaries. They are officially two gram panchayats i e. Busayavalasa and Mutcherlavalasa but they geographically and combined and they celebrate festivals and rituals jointly. But unfortunately even neighboring villages don't know the existence of Mutcherlavalasa which has three cold storages and a jute mill which are generating income source for both the villagers.
