= Tarapuram =

- village
- Interactive map of Tarapuram
- Location in Andhra Pradesh, India
- Coordinates: 18°30′08″N 83°15′16″E
- Country: India
- State: Andhra Pradesh
- District: Vizianagaram

Languages
  - Official: Telugu
- Time zone: UTC+5:30 (IST)
- PIN: 535579
- Vehicle registration: AP-35
- Nearest city: Salur
- Literacy: 34%
- Climate: hot (Köppen)

Tarapuram (also spelled Tharapuram) is a village and a Gram panchayat in Ramabhadrapuram mandal, Vizianagaram district, Andhra Pradesh, India.
