= Salur mandal =

- Mandal
- Interactive map outlining mandal
- Location in Andhra Pradesh, India
- Coordinates: 18.5333°N 83.2167°E
- Country: India
- State: Andhra Pradesh
- District: Parvathipuram Manyam
- Headquarters: Salur

Government
  - Body: Mandal Parishad

Population (2011)
  - Total: 101,386

Languages
  - Official: Telugu
- Time zone: UTC+5:30 (IST)

Salur mandal is one of the 34 mandals in Parvathipuram Manyam district of the Indian state of Andhra Pradesh. It is administration under Parvathipuram revenue division and headquartered at Salur. The mandal is bounded by Makkuva, Ramabhadrapuram, Pachipenta and Bobbili mandals. A portion of it also borders the state of Odisha.

== Demographics ==
As of 2011 census, the mandal had a population of 101,386. The total population constitute, 49,731 males and 51,655 females.

== Government and politics ==
Salur mandal is one of the four mandals in Salur (Assembly constituency), which in turn is a part of Araku (Lok Sabha constituency), one of the 25 Lok Sabha constituencies representing Andhra Pradesh. The present MLA is Rajanna Dora Peedika, who won the Andhra Pradesh Legislative Assembly election, 2014 representing YSR Congress Party.

== Towns and villages ==
As of 2011 2011 census of India, the mandal has 89 settlements. It includes 1 town and 88 villages.

The settlements in the mandal are listed below:

1. Annamrajuvalasa
2. Antivalasa
3. Baguvalasa
4. Bandapai
5. Barnaguda
6. Bhavanipuram
7. Borabanda
8. Butalakarrivalasa
9. Chandrappavalasa
10. Chemidipatipolam
11. Chinavootagedda
12. Chintamala
13. Chora
14. Dagaravalasa
15. Dattivalasa
16. Devubutchamma Peta
17. Diguvamendangi
18. Diguvasembi
19. Doliyamba
20. Donkalavelaga Valasa
21. Dugdasagaram
22. Dulibhadra
23. Eduladandigam
24. Gadilavalasa
25. Ganjaibhadra
26. Gunjari
27. Gurrapuvalasa
28. Guruvinayuni
29. Jaggudoravalasa
30. Jeegiram
31. Jilleduvalasa
32. Kanapalabanda
33. Kandulapadam
34. Karadavalasa
35. Karasuvalasa
36. Keerapadu
37. Kodama
38. Kodukarakavalasa
39. Kondakaraka Valasa @ Janavarivalasa
40. Kothavalasa
41. Kotiya
42. Kottuparuvu
43. Kudakaru
44. Kuddadivalasa
45. Kurmarajupeta
46. Kurukutti
47. Laxmipuram
48. Lolingabhadra
49. Maipalle -
50. Maripalle
51. Masika Chintala Valasa
52. Mavudi
53. Mirtivalasa
54. Mokhasadandigam
55. Mokhasamamidi Palle
56. Mucherlavalasa
57. Mudakaru
58. Mudangi
59. Mugadavalasa
60. Mulakkayavalasa
61. Narlavalasa
62. Neliparti
63. Nimmalapadu
64. Pagulachennuru
65. Panasalavalasa
66. Pandirimamidi Valasa
67. Parannavalasa
68. Pattuchennuru
69. Pedapadam
70. Pedapadammutta
71. Pedavalasa
72. Poyimala
73. Purohitunivalasa
74. Salur (M)
75. Sariki
76. Sikhaparuva
77. Sirivara
78. Sivaramapuram
79. Solipiguda
80. Surapadu @ Kanjupaka
81. Teenusamantha Valasa
82. Tentuboddavalasa
83. Thonam
84. Thunda
85. Tupakivalasa
86. Vallapuram
87. Yeguvamendangi
88. Yeguvasembi

Note: M-Municipality
