= Komatipalli =

Komatipalli Komatipalle
- village
- Interactive map of Komatipalli
- Location in Andhra Pradesh, India Komatipalli (India)
- Coordinates: 18.6021°N 83.3956°E
- Country: India
- State: Andhra Pradesh
- District: Vizianagaram

Population (2001)
  - Total: 1,149

Languages
  - Official: Telugu
- Time zone: UTC+5:30 (IST)
- PIN: 535558
- Vehicle registration: AP35

Komati-palli is a village and Gram panchayat in Bobbili mandal of Vizianagaram district in Andhra Pradesh, India.

== Demographics ==
As of 2001 census, the demographic details of this villages is as follows:

- Total Population: 1,149 in 268 Households.
- Male Population: 579
- Female Population: 570
- Children Under 6-years of age: 154 (Boys - 73 and Girls - 81)
- Total Literates: 448

== See also ==
- Bobbili mandal
