= Paradhi =

- village
- Interactive map of Paradhi
- Location in Andhra Pradesh, India Paradhi (India)
- Coordinates: 18.525027°N 83.306558°E
- Country: India
- State: Andhra Pradesh

Languages
  - Official: Telugu
- Time zone: UTC+5:30 (IST)
- Vehicle registration: AP35

Paradi or Paradhi is a village and Gram panchayat in Bobbili mandal of Vizianagaram district in Andhra Pradesh, India.

Paradhi Anicut in this village irrigates about 33.11 km^{2} of land.

== See also ==
- Bobbili mandal
