= INS Dega =

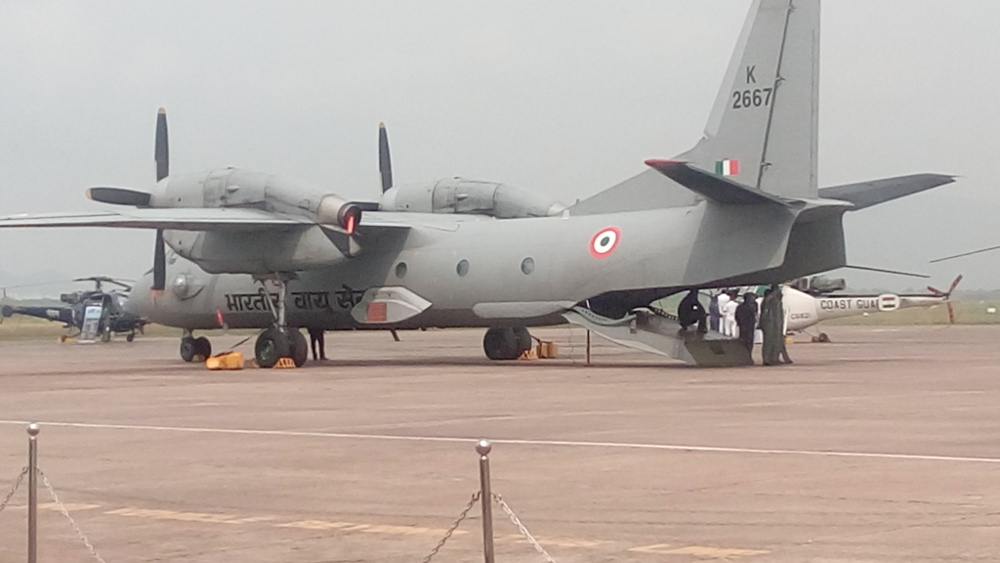
- IATA: none; ICAO: VOVZ

Summary
- Airport type: Naval Air Station and civil enclave
- Operator: Indian Navy
- Location: Visakhapatnam, India
- Elevation AMSL: 15 ft (4.6 m)
- Coordinates: 17°43′16″N 083°13′28″E

Map
- Location within Andhra Pradesh Location within India

Runways
Direction	Length		Surface
Direction	m	ft	Surface
05/23	1,829	6,000	Asphalt
10/28	3,050	10,007	Asphalt
- Source: DAFIF

INS Dega (ICAO: VOVZ), is a naval air station of the Indian Navy, located in Visakhapatnam, Andhra Pradesh. It has a civil enclave which served as Visakhapatnam's main airport from the early 2000s until 16 August 2026, after that, the commercial operations were transferred to the Alluri Sitarama Raju International Airport.

== History ==
During the Second World War, an airstrip was constructed in Visakhapatnam for the Royal Air Force. After the war, the air strip remained unused until opening for civil operations in 1962, and regular services were suspended soon after due to poor passenger demand. Indian Navy's helicopter squadron INAS 321 was established at INS Circars in Visakhapatnam on 23 December 1972. In 1976, a helipad and a hangar were constructed adjacent to the airfield. Regular civilian flights also resumed at the airport in the same year. On 12 March 1986, the ownership of the airport was transferred from the National Airports Authority of India (later Airports Authority of India) to the Indian Navy. It was designated as 'Naval Air Station, Visakhapatnam' and additional hangars, maintenance facilities and an operations complex were constructed. The 321 Chetak Flight, along with other shipborne aircraft, was initially based at the air base. On 21 October 1991, the air station was renamed and formally commissioned as INS Dega (meaning an eagle like bird in Telugu).

The airport underwent expansion and modernisation from 2002, including the construction of a new runway and passenger terminal. The new runway was inaugurated on 15 June 2007 and was opened to commercial traffic on 30 March 2008. A new terminal building, built at a cost of ₹950 million (equivalent to ₹2.4 billion or US$25 million in 2023), was inaugurated on 20 February 2009.

The ICAO airport code was changed from VEVZ to VOVZ on 17 November 2011, and night operations began in 2012. In 2013, the Indian Navy considered establishing a new air base at Badangi, near Vizianagaram, to reduce the increasing air traffic at INS Dega. However, in July 2014, the Ministry of Defence sanctioned ₹4.5 billion (US$47 million) for technical support and infrastructure development at the air base. The expansion plan proposed increasing the base from 1,100 to 1,500 acres (450 to 610 ha). A parallel taxiway was also planned to reduce runway occupancy time. In October 2014, the airport suffered extensive damage from cyclone Hudhud and subsequently underwent significant reconstruction.

In 2022, the Government of Andhra Pradesh and Indian Navy agreed to gradually shift civilian operations to the planned Alluri Sitarama Raju International Airport at Bhogapuram. Under the agreement, about 170 acres (69 ha) of the airport would remain under Navy control, while the remaining area would be managed by the Airport Authority of India (AAI) for civilian operations. In 2023, AAI proposed a new terminal costing ₹2.4 billion (US$25 million), along with four additional parking bays and a new apron. Commercial operations were transferred to Alluri Sitarama Raju International Airport on 17 August 2026 with the airport's IATA code, VTZ, also transferred to the new airport on the same date. The airport continues to operate for non-scheduled civilian flights.

== Facilities ==
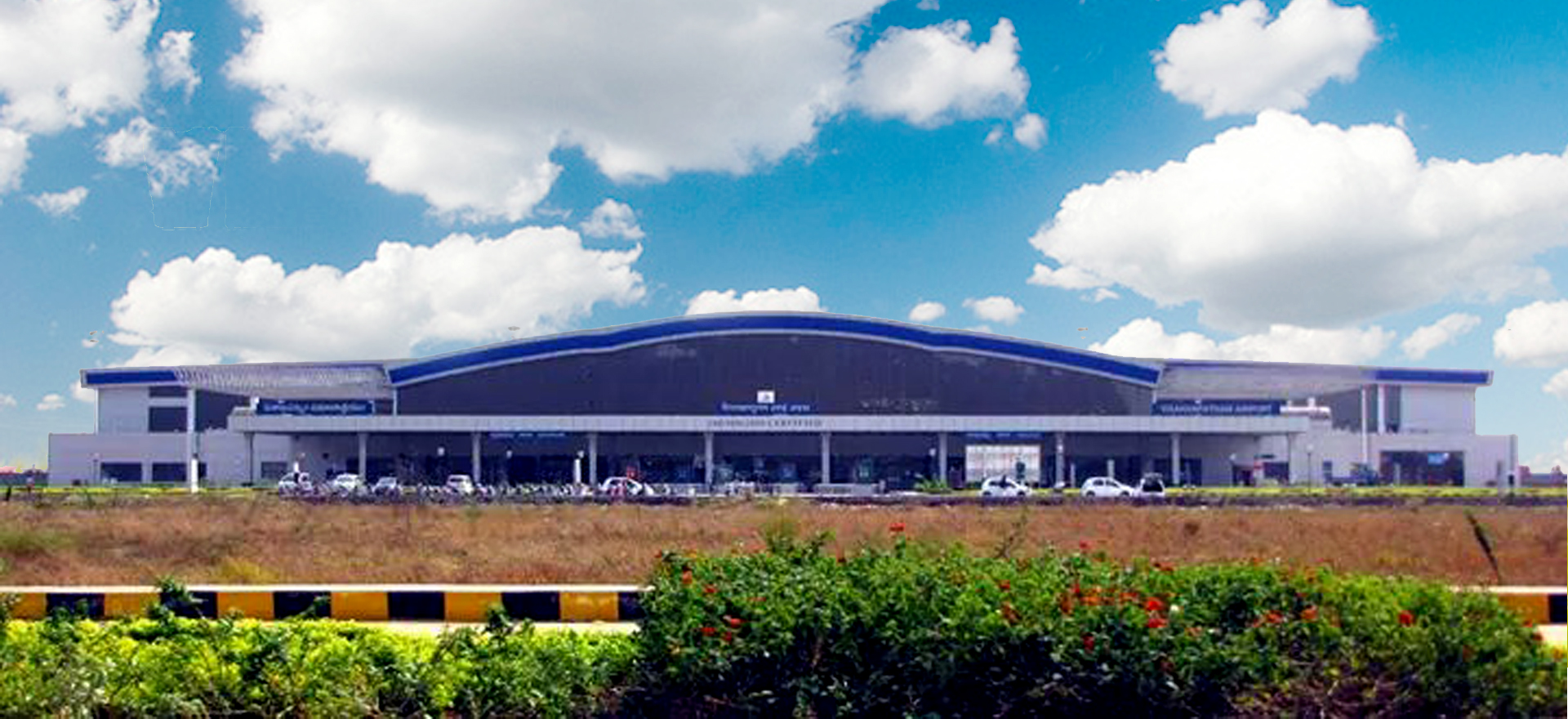
Civilian passenger terminal at the airport

INS Dega covers 350.31 acres (141.77 ha), of which 276.89 acres (112.05 ha) are in use. It has one, 10/28, measuring 3,050 m × 45 m (10,007 ft × 148 ft), equipped with CAT-1 Instrument landing system and night landing facilities. The older runway, 05/23, measuring 1,829 m × 45 m (6,001 ft × 148 ft), is no longer operational and is used by the Navy for aircraft parking. The airfield has three taxiways (N3 to N5). There are 16 aircraft parking bays across two aprons, including three with jet bridges. There are also three remote bays, three cargo-aircraft bays, and isolated bays for military aircraft.

The passenger terminal had an annual capacity of 2.74 million passengers. The domestic terminal covered 19,800 m^{2} (213,000 sq ft), and the international departure and arrival terminals occupied 5,723 m^{2} (61,600 sq ft) and 5,429 m^{2} (58,440 sq ft) of built up area. At peak times, the terminal can handle 400 domestic and 300 international passengers. The terminal had 20 check-in counters, 12 immigration counters, 14 customs counters, three baggage conveyors, and seven X-ray scanners.

== Units ==
As of 2015, INS Dega housed about 40 aircraft across five squadrons/flights and four ship-borne flights. A new squadron, INAS 324, was commissioned on 4 July 2022.

Aircraft squadrons
Squadron	Nickname	Date activated (Note: First activation of the squadron at INS Dega)	Aircraft	Image
INAS 333	Eagles	1 October 2000	Kamov Ka-28	
INAS 311	Kites	24 March 2009	Dornier 228	
INAS 350	Harpoons	24 March 2009	Westland Sea King 42C	
INAS 551	Phantoms	1 January 2014	BAE Hawk Mk 132	
INAS 324	Kestrels	4 July 2022	HAL Dhruv Mk.III MR	

The air station also houses an unknown number of Unmanned Aerial Vehicles. In 2014, the Indian Navy planned to base a squadron of 17 Mikoyan MiG-29K/KUB fighter aircraft at INS Dega to strengthen the security of India's eastern seaboard. Following the transfer of regular commercial operations in August 2026, INS Dega is planned to host a squadron of 26 Dassault Rafale M fighters associated with INS Vikrant.

== Incidents ==
On 2 June 2010, an Indian Navy HAL Chetak helicopter operating from the air base crashed into Sarada River after hitting high-tension electric wires. Local fishermen rescued the injured crew. One officer died and three were injured.

On 16 February 2012, an Indian Navy IAI Searcher UAV crashed into a hill near Himachal Nagar, Gajuwaka, while returning to the air base after an operation. Navy personnel later recovered its black box.

== Statistics ==
Annual passenger traffic and aircraft movement
Year	Passenger traffic		Aircraft movement	
Year	Passengers	Percent change	Aircraft movements	Percent change
2025-2026	2,967,744	0.4	21,799	1.8
2024-2025	2,955,089	6.0	22,210	▲10.7
2023-2024	2,788,665	11.5	20,071	4.25
2022-2023	2,500,654	55.3	20,961	▲40.9
2021-2022	1,610,483	44.6	14,878	▲39.5
2020-2021	1,113,513	58.5	10,667	▼49
2019-2020	2,681,283	6.0	20,935	6.9
2018-2019	2,853,390	15	23,695	20.9
2017-2018	2,480,379	5.2	19,595	0.2
2016-2017	2,358,029	30.7	19,550	16.8
2015-2016	1,804,634	26.9	16,739	46.3
2014-2015	1,099,480		11,445	

Busiest domestic routes from Visakhapatnam Airport (2023–24)
Rank	Airport	Carriers	Departing passengers
1	Hyderabad, Telangana	Air India Express, IndiGo	4,19,189
2	Bengaluru, Karnataka	Air India Express, IndiGo	2,96,215
3	Delhi	Air India, IndiGo	2,34,947
4	Chennai, Tamil Nadu	IndiGo	1,29,266
5	Mumbai, Maharashtra	Air India, Air India Express, IndiGo	1,26,324
6	Kolkata, West Bengal	IndiGo	52,623
7	Tirupati, Andhra Pradesh	IndiGo	23,260
8	Vijayawada, Andhra Pradesh	Air India Express, IndiGo	21,091
9	Port Blair, Andaman and Nicobar Islands	Air India, Air India Express, IndiGo	15,397

== See also ==
- Indian Naval Air Arm
- List of active Indian Navy ships
- List of Indian Air Force stations
- List of overseas military bases of India
