= GMR Group =

Indian conglomerate based in New Delhi

- Industry: Conglomerate
- Founded: 1978; 48 years ago
- Founder: Grandhi Mallikarjuna Rao
- Headquarters: New Delhi, India
- Key people: Grandhi Mallikarjuna Rao; Srinivas Bommidala; G. B. S. Raju; Grandhi Kiran Kumar; B. V. N. Rao
- Services: Airports; Energy; Highways and Urban Infrastructure Development
- Website: www.gmrgroup.in

GMR Group is an Indian multinational conglomerate headquartered in New Delhi. The group was founded in 1978 by Grandhi Mallikarjuna Rao and comprises several companies including GMR Infrastructure, GMR Energy, GMR Airports, and GMR Enterprises. Employing the public-private partnership model, the Group has implemented several infrastructure projects in India. The Group also has a global presence with infrastructure operating assets and projects in several countries including Philippines and Greece.

GMR Group owns, develops, operates, and manages airports, major energy utilities, highways, and urban infrastructure facilities. With a net asset base of nearly US$25 billion, it is one of India's largest infrastructure development companies. GMR Group is famous for operating the Indira Gandhi International Airport in Palam, Delhi.

== Background ==
GMR Group traces its origins to 1978, when G. M. Rao began his entrepreneurial journey with the acquisition of a jute mill in Rajam, Andhra Pradesh. The group subsequently diversified into several businesses, including banking, insurance, software, breweries, jute, and sugar. Following India's economic liberalisation in the early 1990s, GMR divested many of these non-core businesses and refocused its operations on infrastructure. The group subsequently expanded its presence across airports, energy, highways, and urban infrastructure.

GMR Infrastructure Limited is the infrastructure holding company formed to fund the capital requirements of various infrastructure projects across the sectors. It undertakes the development of infrastructure projects through its various subsidiaries.

GMR has multiple businesses like energy, Airports, infrastructures & constructions.

== Business ==
=== Airports ===
GMR Group entered the airports development space in 2003, through subsidiary GMR Airports Limited.

GMR Airports limited operates Delhi's Indira Gandhi International Airport, Hyderabad's Rajiv Gandhi International Airport, Goa's Manohar International Airport and Nagpur's Dr. Babasaheb Ambedkar International Airport. Besides this, the Group has recently been awarded the concession for the development, operations, and management of Visakhapatnam's Alluri Sitarama Raju International Airport in between of Vizianagaram and Visakhapatnam. In the year 2020, the group signed the concession agreement to commission, operationalize, and maintain the Civilian Enclave at the Bidar Airport in Karnataka. GMR Group is developing airport cities on the commercial lands available around its airports in Delhi, Hyderabad, and Goa.

In the International market, it operates Mactan–Cebu International Airport in The Philippines and New Heraklion International Airport in Greece.

In July 2020, Groupe ADP acquired a 49% stake in GMR Airports.

In December 2025, it was announced that GMR Airports Limited had acquired a further 49.9% stake in Delhi Duty Free Services Private Limited for approximately US$20.3 million, increasing its total shareholding to 66.93%. The acquisition consolidated GMR Airports’ control of the company, which operates duty-free retail outlets at Indira Gandhi International Airport, and did not require additional governmental or regulatory approvals.

=== GMR Aerocity Hyderabad ===
In April 2021, GMR Group announced the launch of GMR Hyderabad Airport City, which is proposed to be the largest aerotropolis in India spread across 1,500-acre (6.1 km^{2}) around Rajiv Gandhi International Airport, and is being billed as an "integrated ecosystem covering Office Space, Retail, Leisure, Entertainment, Hospitality, Education, Healthcare, Aerospace & Logistics". In September 2021, GMR Group said that it would invest ₹ 519.52 crore towards metro connectivity at the airport. During foundation laying ceremony of Hyderabad Airport Metro Express on 9 December 2022, GMR Group contributed ₹625 crore (US$65 million), or 10 percent of the project's cost.

=== GMR Aero Services ===
GMR Aero Services offers specialized services in the field of airport development and operations, which include aviation consultation, engineering and maintenance, operations management, security solutions, and staff training.

==== GMR Aero Academy ====
GMR Aero Academy (GMRAA) was established at the Rajiv Gandhi International Airport, Shamshabad, Hyderabad in 2009.

GMR started its Aviation Academy in Kochi, Kerala on 23 January 2023 at ASAP Community Skill Park, KINFRA, Kalamassery, Kochi.

==== GMR Aviation ====
GMR Aviation was formed in 2006 to offer aircraft charter services and consultancy for business aviation. Apart from owning and managing its own fleet, GMR Aviation also manages aircraft of other business groups.

==== GMR Engineering and Management Services (GEMS) ====
GMR Engineering and Management Services (GEMS), is a provider of engineering and management services and has been in operation for the last 15 years.

=== Highways ===
==== GMR Highways Ltd ====
GMR Highways builds, owns multiple highways and expressways in India.

- Ambala–Chandigarh Expressway: A 172 lane-kilometer corridor running across NH-21 and NH-22 connecting Punjab, Haryana, Himachal Pradesh, and Delhi.
- GMR Pochanpalli Expressways: A 473 lane-kilometer four-lane national highway project on NH-7 in Andhra Pradesh, designated as a green highway by NHAI.
- Hyderabad-Vijayawada Expressways: A major regional multi-lane highway asset managed under the group's transportation portfolio.

=== Energy ===
GMR Group is a player in the Indian power sector with an installed capacity of 3200 MW. The group has 15 power generation projects across Hydro, Thermal, and Renewable energy of which 11 are operational and 4 are under various stages of development.

=== Urban Infrastructure ===
In the Urban structure business, the GMR group is currently developing an 850- hectare large format 'Special Investment Regions' (SIR) at Krishnagiri, near Hosur in Tamil Nadu. The SIR is designed and developed by GMR as self-contained eco-systems for economic activity.

=== Transportation ===
GMR's Transportation business has surface transport projects including roads, railways, metros, and airstrips/runways in both DBFOT (under GMR Highways) and EPC (under GIL – EPC) segments. In roads and highways, GMR is a leading developer with 6 operating assets adding to the total length of over 2,400 lane km. In railways, GMR has a total order book of 4,000 Crores with projects from clients like Dedicated Freight Corridor Corporation of India (DFCCIL) and Rail Vikas Nigam Limited (RVNL).

=== Sports ===
GMR has forayed into sports by buying Indian Premier League's Delhi Capitals and Pro Kabaddi's UP Yoddha and being the sponsor of Rugby Premier League.

==== Delhi Capitals ====
The Delhi Capitals was established in 2008 as Delhi Daredevils (DD). The franchise is jointly owned by the GMR Group and JSW Group. In 2023, they also jointly bought a team in the Women's Premier League based in Delhi.

==== Dubai Capitals ====
The Dubai Capitals are a cricket team based in Dubai, competes in the International League T20 tournament since 2023. The team won the tournament in the year 2025.

==== UP Yoddha ====
UP Yoddha (UPY) is a Kabaddi team based in Lucknow, Uttar Pradesh that plays in the Pro Kabaddi League.

==== Seattle Orcas ====
The Seattle Orcas were founded in 2023 and compete in the Major League Cricket (MLC). They were runner up in 2023.

==== Southern Brave ====
The Southern Brave are a franchise competing in The Hundred. Following the 2025 franchise sale by the ECB, Hampshire County Cricket Club acquired a 51% stake, while the GMR Group purchased the remaining 49% via auction, taking operational control on 1 October 2025. The Southern Brave have won 2 titles, the men in 2021 and the women in 2023.

=== GMR Varalakshmi Foundation ===
GMR Varalakshmi Foundation (GMRVF), the Corporate Social Responsibility wing of the Group, develops innovative and locale-specific initiatives in the areas of Education; Health, Hygiene & Sanitation; Empowerment & Livelihoods; and Community development programmes.

=== GMR RAXA ===
GMR RAXA is a private security company founded in 2005. It provide various security services like specialised security services, drone services, security consultancy, aviation security, fire safety and technical security. It is composed of former member of the military and law enforcement agencies.
