= Badangi =

- village
- Interactive map of Badangi
- Location in Andhra Pradesh, India Badangi (India)
- Coordinates: 18.494679°N 83.368241°E
- Country: India
- State: Andhra Pradesh
- District: Vizianagaram

Languages
  - Official: Telugu
- Time zone: UTC+5:30 (IST)
- PIN: 535 578
- Vehicle Registration: AP35 (Former); AP39 (from 30 January 2019)

Badangi is a village in Vizianagaram district of the Indian state of Andhra Pradesh. It is located in Badangi mandal.

== Demography ==
Badangi mandal has a population of 49,384 in 2011. Males consists of 24,881 and females 24,503 of the population. According to 2001 census average literacy rate is 49%, below the national average of 59.5%. Male literacy rate is 60% and that of females 38%.

== Badangi Airstrip ==
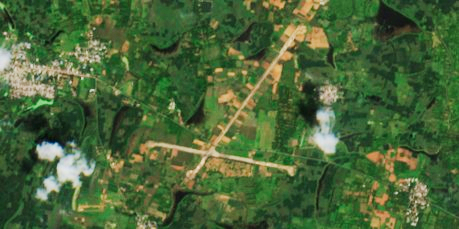
Badangi airstrip satellite image 2024

There is a historic airstrip near Badangi village. It was used as command base for Royal Air Force in British India. The construction was started in 1942 and completed in 1943. It was constructed by Mackenzie company and was the second biggest RAF base after the one at Lahore. It was built on 221 acres (0.89 km^{2}) of land and consisted of two runways in a cross formation. It had control-tower overlooking both the runways, a separate underground armament depot that housed the 250-pound torpedo bombs, many underground bunkers, hangars, staff quarters and a natural pond for the fire-fighting.

The RAF squadron at Badangi comprised Supermarine Spitfire fighters, Hawker Hurricane fighters, Avro Lancaster bombers, Vickers Wellington bombers, Bristol Beaufighter bombers and Douglas Dakota transport aircraft.

It was closed in 1946 as the war was over and was then used to store paddy and wheat by the Food Corporation of India. Today, the huge seven-inch thick solid concrete runway that is being used by the local farmers for threshing the grains. All the other structures have been demolished.

It was first reported in 2013 that the Indian Navy is interested in reactivating the airstrip for operational use alongside INS Dega. This was announced by the then Navy chief Admiral Devendra Kumar Joshi. The base would only be an "alternative" to INS Dega and the entire operations would not be shifted. In February 2023, it was revealed that the Navy needed 1,200 acres (4.9 km^{2}) of rectangular land to setup the Navy base.

== Institutions ==
- There is Andhra Pradesh Social Welfare Residential Junior College in Badangi maintained by Social welfare department of Andhra Pradesh Government.
