= Pachipenta =

- village
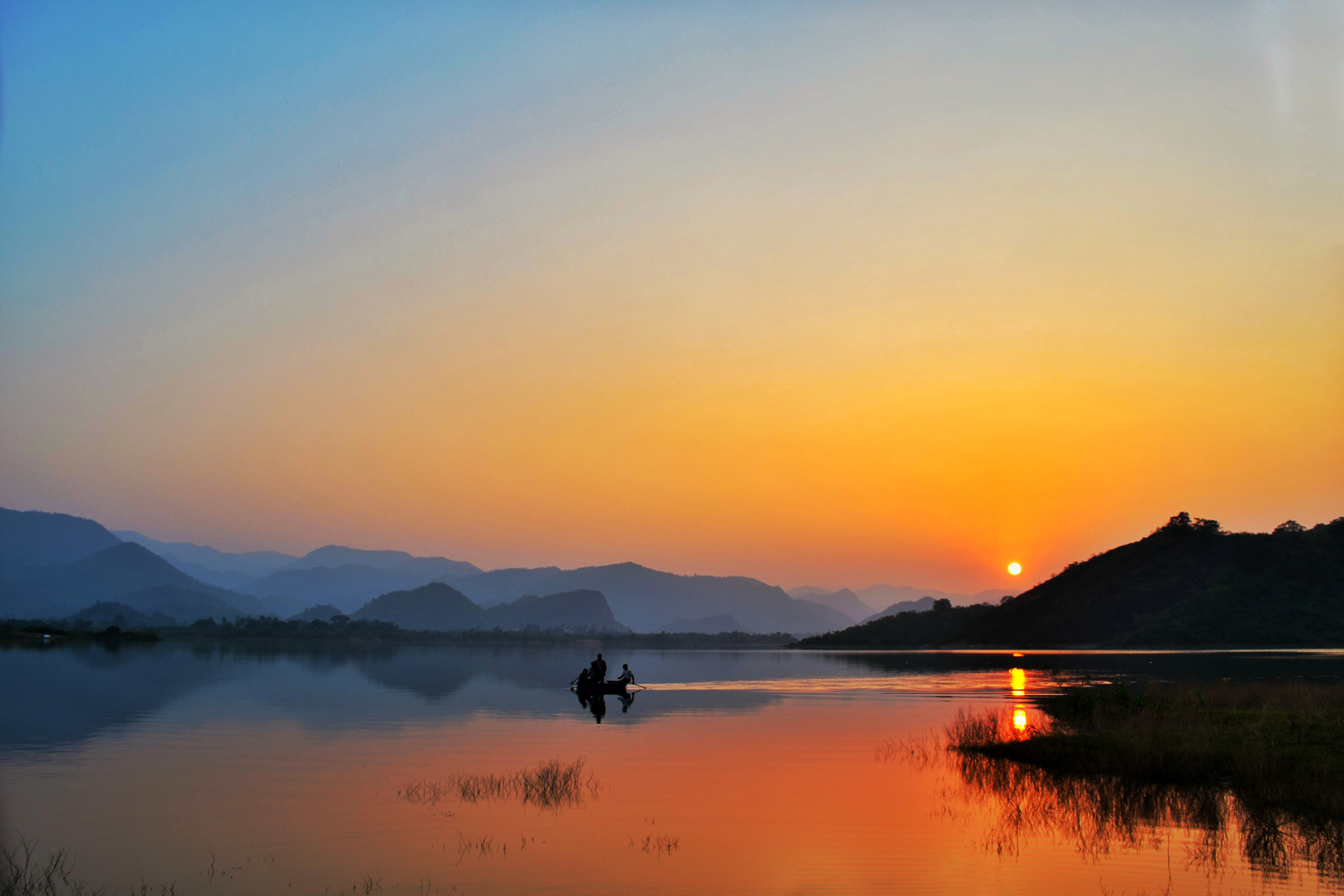
- golden hour sunset.jpg
- Interactive map of Pachipenta
- Location in Andhra Pradesh, India Pachipenta (India)
- Coordinates: 18.46°N 83.11°E
- Country: India
- State: Andhra Pradesh
- District: Parvathipuram Manyam
- Elevation: 219 m (719 ft)

Languages
  - Official: Telugu
- Time zone: UTC+5:30 (IST)
- PIN: 535592
- Telephone code: 08964
- Vehicle Registration: AP35 (Former); AP39 (from 30 January 2019)

Pachipenta is a village in Parvathipuram Manyam district of the Indian state of Andhra Pradesh. It is located in Pachipenta mandal.

== History ==
Pachipenta gained sudden significance in the later medieval history of Kalinga under its rulers - the Jeypore Suryavanshis. According to historians like N. Senapati & N.K.Sahu, the zamindari of Pachipenta was founded by Vishwambhar Dev I (1672-1676) who freed Kalinga from the weakened Golconda sultanate by defeating the Nawab of Chicacole (Sri Kakulam) in 1673. He granted the zamindari of Pachipenta that comprised seven villages to Tammanna Dora with the title of 'Dakshina Kavata Durga-raj' or the 'lord of the southern portal'. Viswambhar re-established the position of his kingdom and became the Maharajah of Kalinga.

The zamindar of Pachipenta in 1712 claimed independence from the kingdom of Jeypore that was breaking into different fragments under the weak rule of Balaram Dev III. The British entered the region in 1775 and captured all tiny zamindaris including Pachipenta. In 1908, Maharaja Sir Vikram Dev III purchased the zamindari for six lakhs and the region re-immersed into the territory of Jeypore kings until 1947.

== Geography ==
Pachipenta is located at 18°28′N 83°07′E. It has an average elevation of 219 meters (721 ft). It is bounded by Koraput district of Orissa state on the Northern side.

== Demography ==
Pachipenta Mandal has a population of 43,995 in 2001. Males consists of 22,144 and females 21,851 of the population. The average literacy rate is 35%, lowest in the entire the district. Male literacy rate is 43% and that of females 26%.
