= Ramabhadrapuram =

- Village
- Interactive map of Ramabhadrapuram
- Location in Andhra Pradesh, India Ramabhadrapuram (India)
- Coordinates: 18.5000°N 83.2833°E
- Country: India
- State: Andhra Pradesh
- District: Vizianagaram
- Elevation: 111 m (364 ft)

Population (2011)
  - Total: 10,063

Languages
  - Official: Telugu
- Time zone: UTC+5:30 (IST)
- PIN: 535579
- Vehicle registration: AP-35

Rama-bhadra-puram is a village and Ramabhadrapuram mandal headquarters in Vizianagaram district of Andhra Pradesh, India.

== Geography ==
Ramabhadrapuram is located at 18.5000°N 83.2833°E. It has an average elevation of 111 meters.

== Demography ==
Ramabhadrapuram mandal had a population of 47,232 in 2001. Males constitute 23,423 and females 23,809 of the population. The average literacy rate is 47%. Male literacy rate is 59% and that of females 35%.
