= Salur =

- Town
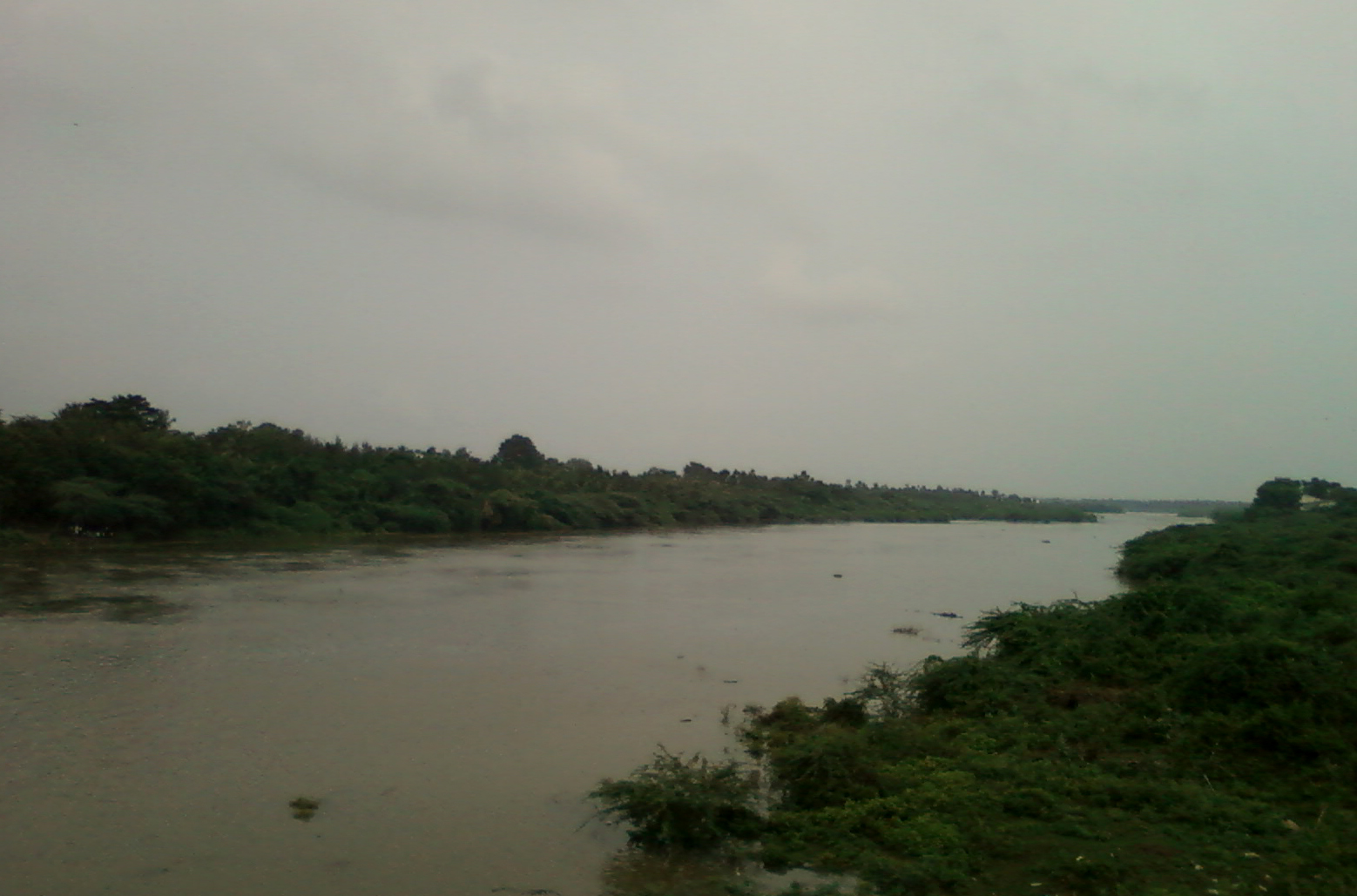
- Vegavathi river at Salur

- Location in Andhra Pradesh, India
- Coordinates: 18.5333°N 83.2167°E
- Country: India
- State: Andhra Pradesh
- District: Parvathipuram Manyam

Government
  - Type: Municipality
  - Body: Salur Municipality, BUDA
  - MLA: Peedika Rajanna Dora

Area
  - Total: 19.55 km^{2} (7.55 sq mi)
- Elevation: 138.05 m (452.9 ft)

Population (2011)
  - Total: 49,500
  - Density: 2,530/km^{2} (6,560/sq mi)

Languages
  - Official: Telugu
- Time zone: UTC+5:30 (IST)
- PIN: 535 591
- Telephone code: 91–8964
- Vehicle Registration: AP35 (Former); AP39 (from 30 January 2019)
- Website: Salur Municipality

Salur or Saluru is a municipal town and mandal headquarters in Parvathipuram Manyam district, of the Indian state of Andhra Pradesh.

== Geography ==
Salur is on the banks of River Vegavathi at 18.5333°N 83.2167°E. It has an average elevation of 118 metres (387 ft). It is bounded by Makkuva, Bobbili, Ramabhadrapuram and Pachipenta mandals of Andhra Pradesh state. Salur is surrounded with green forests and chains of hills on two sides and by River Vegavathi on the other two.

The climate of the town is generally characterized by high humidity almost all round the year, oppressive summer, and seasonal rainfall. The temperature varies between 17 and 40 degrees of Celsius. Average annual rainfall is 1074.0 mm. The nature of the soil is generally black cotton soil.

== Demographics ==
As of 2011 Census of India, the town had a population of 49,500. The total population constitutes 24,021 males, 25,479 females and 4,900 children (age 0–6 years). The average literacy rate stands at 73.22% with 32,656 literates, approximately equal to the national average of 73.00%.

== Administration ==
=== Municipality ===
Salur was a major panchayat till 1950. It was established in 1950 and was upgraded as grade II municipality in 2001. The extent of Salur municipality area is 19.55 mi^{2} (50.6 km^{2}).

The source of water supply is River Vegavathi, with 200 public taps and 226 public bore–wells. The municipality supplies 3 million litres per day of total drinking water is supplied with a per capita of 80 litres per day. The municipality has 54 km (34 mi) of roads, 4 public parks, 5 playgrounds, 11 community halls etc. There are 23 elementary and 2 secondary schools for education purpose.

=== Legislative Assembly ===
Andhra Pradesh Legislative Assembly Constituency of Salur is reserved for Scheduled Tribes.

== Education ==
The primary and secondary school education is imparted by government, aided and private schools, under the state School Education Department. The medium of instruction followed by schools are English and Telugu.

== See also ==
- List of municipalities in Andhra Pradesh
