= Rajam =

- Town
- Location in Andhra Pradesh, India
- Coordinates: 18.447858°N 83.661733°E
- Country: India
- State: Andhra Pradesh
- District: Vizianagaram

Government
  - Type: Nagar Panchayat
  - Body: Rajam Nagar Panchayat
  - MLA: Kondru Murali Mohan

Area
  - Total: 32.75 km^{2} (12.64 sq mi)
- Elevation: 61 m (200 ft)

Population (2011)
  - Total: 42,197
  - Density: 1,288/km^{2} (3,337/sq mi)

Languages
  - Official: Telugu
- Time zone: UTC+5:30 (IST)
- PIN: 532127
- Telephone code: +91–8941
- Vehicle Registration: AP30 (Former); AP39 (from 30 January 2019)
- Website: cdma.ap.gov.in/RAJAM/

Rajam is a town in Vizianagaram District of the Indian state of Andhra Pradesh. It is a nagar panchayat and the headquarters of Rajam mandal. It is situated at a distance of 51 km from the district headquarters.

The place has nostalgic association with Thandra Paparaya, the valiant Sardar of Bobbili and who is credited with slaying of Vijayaramaraju, the Maharaja of Vijayanagaram at the end of the Battle of Bobbili in 1757.

== Geography ==
Rajam is located at 18.28N 83.40E. It has an average elevation of 42 meters (137 feet).

== Demographics ==
As of 2011 India census, Rajam had a population of 62,197.

== Government and politics ==
Rajam Nagar panchayat constituted in the year 2005. It is spread over an area of 27.65 km^{2} (10.68 sq mi) and has 20 election wards. Each represented by a ward member and the wards committee is headed by a chairperson. The present municipal commissioner of the town is Ramesh. The town lies within the Vizianagaram Lok Sabha constituency.

== Notable people ==
- Grandhi Mallikarjuna Rao – founding chairman of GMR Group
- Pingali Nagendrarao - popular Telugu writer, movie script writer, lyricist
- Harsha Vardhan is an Indian film character actor, comedian and screenwriter known for his works predominantly in Telugu cinema
