= VDU =

VDU may stand for:

- VDU, a self contained attitude control thruster block (Russian: ВДУ) on space station Mir
- Federation of Independents (German: Verband der Unabhängigen), German nationalist political party in Austria active from 1949 to 1955
- Vacuum distillation unit, a processing unit in an oil refinery
- Video display unit, a synonym for a type of computer monitor
- Vikram Dev University, a state university located in Jeypore, India.
- Visual display unit, an electronic visual display
- Vytautas Magnus University (Lithuanian: Vytauto Didžiojo Universitetas) in Kaunas, Lithuania

== See also ==
- Vudu
