= Rayudu =

Rayudu (also spelled as Raidu or Roydoo or Rayalu) is a title used by South Indian Telugu castes such as Kapu/Balija, Velama. Rayudu title is native to Andhra Pradesh state in India. Rayudu is a Telugu name and synonym for the word "Royal". The word "Rayudu" means "king", or "a man with rich background".

== Notable people ==
- Vaddadi Subbarayudu, popular Indian Telugu writer and translator
- Ambati Rayudu, Indian cricketer
- Bathyala Changal Rayudu, politician
- Kothapalli Subba Rayudu, Indian politician, member of the Lok Sabha, and minister in Andhra Pradesh
- Rohit Rayudu, Indian cricketer
- Sugavasi Palakondrayudu, Indian politician, former member of the Lok Sabha and minister in Andhra Pradesh
- Tandra Papa Rayudu, army general of Bobbili princely state
