= Biswanathpur =

- Village

Odia transcription(s)
- Nickname: Badagao
- Location in Odisha, India
- Coordinates: 19°09′37.2″N 84°46′21.2″E
- Country: India
- State: Odisha
- District: Ganjam
- Founded by: Maharajah Vishwanath Dev Gajapati
- Elevation: 11.1 m (36 ft)

Population (2018)
  - Total: 5,500

Languages
  - Official: Odia
- Time zone: UTC+5:30 (IST)
- PIN: 761008
- Telephone code: 0680
- Vehicle registration: OD-07
- Nearest city: Berhampur, Ichchapuram
- Sex ratio: 50%-50% ♂/♀
- Climate: Tropical wet and dry (Köppen)

Biswanathpur is a village in Ganjam district in the south of Odisha, India, bordering Andhra Pradesh. This village owes its name to Vishwanath Dev Gajapati, the Suryavanshi king of Kalinga who founded this place after conducting a royal ancient ritual known as 'Vajapeya Yagna'. It is located southeast of Berhampur and northeast of Ichchapuram.

== History ==
Vishwanath Dev was a king of Nandapur and a tributary of the Gajapati Empire. After the death of Prataprudra Deva, his heirs were assassinated by his minister Govinda Vidyadhar. The fall of the Gajapatis left a political vacuum and eventually all vassal and tributary kingdoms under the Gajapatis claimed independence. At that point of time, Vishwanath began expanding his territories towards the northern region or Utkala (Ut: Uttar, Kal: Kalinga). In 1542, he sent Mukund Harichandran Bahubalendra to seize the fort of Govinda Vidyadhar in Cuttack. Mukund was a feudal chief of Krishnakota (Kasimkota) feudatory of his kingdom. Evidently, Mukund was successful in forcing Govinda Vidyadhar into surrendering the whole northern territory and convinced him to become a tributary of Vishwanath. Later, Vishwanath appointed Mukund as the minister of Govinda Vidyadhar's kingdom who later went on to occupy the kingdom of Utkala.

After claiming the northern territories, Vishwanath founded a kingdom that touched the confines of modern-day Jharkhand and West Bengal in the north to Godavari River and Telangana in the south. As a result, he conducted a vedic ritual known as ‘Vajapeya Yagna' that is second only to the Ashvamedha. After the completion of the ritual he donated 'Dana Sasana' or a gift decree and named the place as Vishwanathpur.

== Education ==
The village has Biswanathpur primary school and C.D.T.Vidya Mandir (High school).
