= Umerkote =

- Town
- Location in Odisha, India Umerkote (India)
- Coordinates: 19.665°N 82.212°E
- Country: India
- State: Odisha
- District: Nabarangpur

Government
  - MLA: Sri Nityanand Gond BJP

Area
  - Total: 30 km^{2} (12 sq mi)
- Elevation: 615.69 m (2,020.0 ft)

Population (2011)
  - Total: 28,993
  - Density: 192/km^{2} (500/sq mi)

Languages
  - Official: Odia & English
- Time zone: UTC+5:30 (IST)
- PIN: 764073
- Telephone code: 06866
- Vehicle registration: OD-24
- Sex ratio: 1000 ♂/♀
- Website: nabarangpur.nic.in

Umerkote, also known as Umarkot and Amarkot, is a town of Nabarangpur district, Odisha, in eastern India. Umerkote is an urban area and the name of a Municipality declared on 3 March 2014 (earlier Notified Area Council) and a Subdivision declared by State Cabinet on 3 November 2015. The town is a prominent business place of the Nabarangpur District.

Umerkote is situated in the northern corner of Nabarangpur District and administratively borders Chhattisgarh in the west. It is 62 km (39 miles) away from district headquarters. A left diversion from National Highway 201 at Papadahandi, towards Raipur, connects to Umerkote. A popular local deity is Maa Pendrani or Pendrahandiani. The word "Maa" means the "mother". She is believed to be the saviour of people living in the area and a provider of health, wealth and protection.

== Demographics ==
As of 2011 India census, Umerkote had a population of 27,864. Males constituted 51% of the population and females 49%. Umarkote had an average literacy rate of 60%, higher than the national average of 59.5%: male literacy is 65%, and female literacy is 47%. In Umerkote, 15% of the population is under 6 years of age.

== Geography ==
A plateau of the Kondan Range, a terrain of Eastern Ghats holds Umerkote at its centre. The average elevation of Umerkote is approximately 620 metres (2,020 ft) above sea level. Small hills and mounts cover the place, providing a number of perennial sources of water as streams and ponds. Bhaskel Medium Irrigation Project, a site 9 km (6 miles) away from Umerkote town, is the source of irrigation. Its out-stream, namely Bhaskel, flows by the town, giving a production of vegetables and pulses throughout the year.

Branches of the main canals of the Bhaskel Medium Irrigation Project surround the outskirts of Umerkote to give up a fertile land for double crops and other seasonal productions.

== Climate ==
The average annual rainfall experienced is 888.2 millimetres (35.0 in). Usually summers are hot with a maximum of 45 °C (113 °F), and winters are mild with an average minimum of 6 °C (43 °F). For the first time in the recent history of Umerkote, snow flake crystal deposition found on paddy straw heaps near DNK and Shanti Nagar area with temperature as low as 3.2 °C (37.8 °F) on 15 January 2012. Earlier on the previous day it was found for a short period with minimum temperature 3.8 °C (38.8 °F).

Year	Maximum	Minimum
2008	42.8 °C (109.0 °F) on 22 May 2008	9.2 °C (48.6 °F) on 28 Dec 2008
2009	41.2 °C (106.2 °F) on 1 May 2009	8.6 °C (47.5 °F) on 17 Dec 2009, 9.4 °C (48.9 °F) on 18 Dec
2010	44.3 °C (111.7 °F) on 24 May 2010	4.8 °C (40.6 °F) on 27 Dec 2010, 5.5 °C (41.9 °F) on 4 Dec
2011	41.7 °C (107.1 °F) on 19 May 2011	6.8 °C (44.2 °F) on 4 Jan 2011
2012	43.4 °C (110.1 °F) on 23 May 2012	3.2 °C (37.8 °F) on 15 Jan 2012 (Ice Flake Formation)
2013	44.5 °C (112.1 °F) on 25 May 2013	7.1 °C (44.8 °F) on 15 Jan 2013
2014	42.2 °C (108.0 °F) on 23 May 2014	4.5 °C (40.1 °F) on 18 Dec 2014
2015	43.0 °C (109.4 °F) on 23 May 2015	6.0 °C (42.8 °F) on 18 Jan 2015

== People ==
Umerkote was initially a tribal-dominated place, and the post-independent period added migrants to its population. With growth, township people from other parts of Odisha and neighbouring states showed their interest to live at Umerkote. People there mostly do business, and a considerable number are government employees. Now the place has a majority of Hindus. However, Muslims are more in number than the Christians. People of other religions are very few in number. The major language spoken in this region is Odia. The Odisha Government sheltered large numbers of Bangladeshi refugees in this region. They came to India as refugees during the 1960s. Umerkote was included in the D.N.K. project under the Government of India.

== Economy ==
The main economical factor over which Umerkote stands is production of maize and paddy. Outskirts yield maize, and this town is the hub for the transportation of tonnes of maize in post-rain seasons.

Other than maize, some forest products like Kendu Leaf, Sal Seed, and vegetables are being exported to outside. Being based mainly on agriculture, business relating to fertilizer, pesticides, garments and retail are conducted. Weekly markets (Hato) are organized in a nearby location on fixed weekdays, to share products within the area. Umerkote is one of the highest producer of maize crop in whole Odisha.

== Festivals ==
The Odia Hindu festivals Dussera, Rath Yatra, Ganesh Pooja and Kalisi Yatra are some distinguishable festivals observed in Umerkote. Apart from other occasions, traditional festivals like Holi, Biswakarma Pooja, Gajalaxmi Pooja and Deepawali are being celebrated with immense contrast. furthermore there are a number of churches in the urban area of umerkote. Christmas is also celebrated Including general celebrations, tribals retain their identity through several typical festivals like Mondei, Chaiti Parab and Kalashi yatra. Mondei, an annual tribal festival, has its uniqueness which has been predominantly celebrated by tribals in order to share the happiness of their fruitful harvest. Later it had been declared a state-level festival and is celebrated officially, each year, in the first week of November.

== Public places ==
Umerkote has many public places like Pendrani Temple, Jagannath temple, Sri Ramakrishna Temple, Maa Kali Mandir (UV 03 Dongriguda) and Sri Ram Temple and a Church. It has also a major mosque, and a Madrasa has been set up with help of the local people. Including several other viewable places, nearby to Umerkote, it has Hanuman Vatika at 4 km (2 miles) distance near Nuagaon, adding small places of local interest also visited by many people.

It has two hospitals, one of the government situated at the mid of the town and another is DNK Hospital (Later named as Zonal Hospital). Specialists in different branches provide health service to the people. Pendrani College, established in 1984, has been set up with local help giving education to collegiates students up to graduation. Odisha Adarsha Vidyalaya, Sadasiv Sukumar Government High School, Government Girl's High School, and Saheed Laxman Nayak Public School and Swami Vivekananda Vidyamandir here are the centre for higher secondary education. A number of primary schools and upper primary schools have been set up at different locations in the Umerkote town. RRTTSS with OUAT has set up a crop research centre near the town. A newly established women's college, namely Biju Patnaik ST Women's College, Umerkote, has started functioning recently.

== Service ==
The town has been expanded with fully functional government services, including Panchayat Samiti, a police station, post office, tahasil office, four filling stations, Indane gas filling station, three cashew factories, one cattle feed industry, four to five rice mills, Government Secondary Training School, BSNL telephone exchange, Industrial Training Centre for Women, a water supply, SOUTHCO, Circuit House, Lic office, office of Chartered accountants and other different offices along with it.

Umerkote has two courts. A J.M.F.C. Court which is established in the year 1962 which has jurisdiction over Umerkot, Raighar, Dabugaon, Chandahandi, Jharigam and Kundei Police Station areas in Criminal and Civil matters. Recently in the year 2013 a Sub-Judge court has been established in Umerkote.

Among non-government institutions like Saraswati Sishu Mandir, Sri Aurobindo Purnanga Sikhya Kendra are owned by locals, and among government school Odisha Adarsha VidyalayaSwami Vivekananda Vidya Mandir Up Graded Project High School in Nabarangpur District.

Cellular mobile service by BSNL and Airtel have been set up earlier. Internet Connectivity by BSNL Broadband has been launched since March 2008 and also BSNL 3G service has started in September 2014. Airtel has started its 4G Data Service at Umerkote.

State Bank of India (SBI), Utkal Gramya Bank, ICICI Bank, Axis Bank, Andhra Bank, Bank of Baroda, Punjab National Bank have been established with a large volume of business. SBI, ICICI, PNB, Axis Bank provide ATM service to the people of Umerkote. Recently Another SBI ATM has been installed in front of Umerkote Municipality Office.

At Medical road, recently one soil testing centre has been established by Govt of India.

== Transportation ==
Umerkote is connected to almost all major cities of Odisha, Andhra Pradesh and Chhattisgarh by road. No railway line connects the town directly, but Umerkote has been provided with several buses to Bhubaneswar, Cuttack, Visakhapatnam, Vizianagaram, Brahampur, Jagdalpur, Raipur. Both private and OSRTC buses run in numbers for passenger transportation. Among private buses Raghunath, Rajdhani, Kingfisher non A/C buses connects to Bhubaneswar, DilkhusA/C bus connects to Bhubaneswar and two Naresh travels connects to Raipur, Naresh A/C coach connects to Visakhapatnam, Khambeswari non A/C connects to Brahampur. Among Govt. buses one non A/C bus connects to Bhubaneswar, one non A/C Bus And One A/C Bus connects to Brahampur, two non A/C buses connects to Visakhapatnam, one non A/C bus connects to Vizianagaram, one non A/C bus connects to Bolangir and one bus to kesinga.

Nearest railway stations: Jeypore 106 kilometres (66 mi), Koraput 130 kilometres (81 mi), Kesinga 180 kilometres (112 mi), Raipur 285 kilometres (177 mi), Nagpur 315 km, Jagdalpur 85 kilometres (53 mi).

Nearest airports: Visakhapatnam 320 kilometres (199 mi), Raipur Mana Airport 272 kilometres (169 mi) Bhubaneswar 576 kilometres (358 mi)].

== Tourist spots ==
=== Podagad ===
Podagad, a hill range in the west of the town preserves some historic evidences of ancient dynasties ruling over the area. Rock scriptures, caves and remains of usables have been found. It has a rich ruin of the Nala and Bhakataka dynasty during the invasion of the Mughals. Later it has been occupied by some Buddhists, and then by the Nanda Dynasty of Jeypore region. It is roughly 22 kilometres (14 mi) towards the west of Umerkote, near Dhodra, a small village which is 9 km ahead of Umerkote. The span of Podagad hill ranges 11 km lengthwise and 3.5 km in width (6.8 mi × 2.2 mi). It was 17 small hills meshed up with each other. It has a natural habitat covering many species, and formerly there were many carnivores living in the area. Deforestation for firewood and timber has been devastating the climate of Podagad. Picnic occasions are held at this place in a massive manner during New Years and other winter days.

=== Chandan Dhara ===
Chandan Dhara is a nature area in the deep forests 48 kilometres (30 mi) north of Umerkote, through the village Jharigam. There is a waterfall nearby to the small village Dongriguda. Administrative efforts have been initiated to make it a place of attraction for tourists.

=== Burja ===
Burja is about 8 kilometres (5 mi) from Umerkote, famous for the Siva Mandir. A Siva Linga was discovered by a small girl while she was digging in the field circa 2004. A big temple is now under construction.

== Politics ==
Current MLA from 73-Umarkote (ST) Assembly Constituency is Shri Nityananda Gond from Bharatiya Janata Party. Previous MLA from 73-Umarkote (ST) Assembly Constituency was Sri Subash Gond from Biju Janta Dal (BJD) who was elected for the second term in the Simultaneous General Election 2014 and was first time elected to the house in the By-Election during November 2011. Prior to him late Sri Jagabandhu Majhi of Biju Janata Dal (BJP), who was shot dead on 24 September 2011, in a public meeting at Gona; won the seat in State Elections in 2009 was the MLA from Umerkote. The By-election poll held on 30 November 2011 in which Sri Subash Gond of Biju Janata Dal (BJD) won with a margin of 21061 votes to his contender Sri Dharmu Gond of Bharatiya Janata Party (BJP).

Previous MLAs from this seat were Sri Dharmu Gond Bharatiya Janata Party (BJP), Smt Parama Pujari who won this seat representing Indian National Congress (INC) in 2000, 1995 and 1985 and representing INC(I) in 1980, Sri Gurubaru Majhi of JD in 1990, and Late Rabisingh Majhi of Janata Party (JNP) in 1977.

Umerkote is part of Nowrangpur (Lok Sabha constituency).

Sri Balabhadra Majhi (BJD) is the Member of Parliament from the 12-Nowarangpur Parliamentary Constituency elected in the Simultaneous General Elections 2014 preceded by Sri Pradeep Kumar Majhi (INC).
