= Vikram Deo Verma =

Feudal lord in Jeypore, British India

Maharajah Vikram Dev IV Bahadur
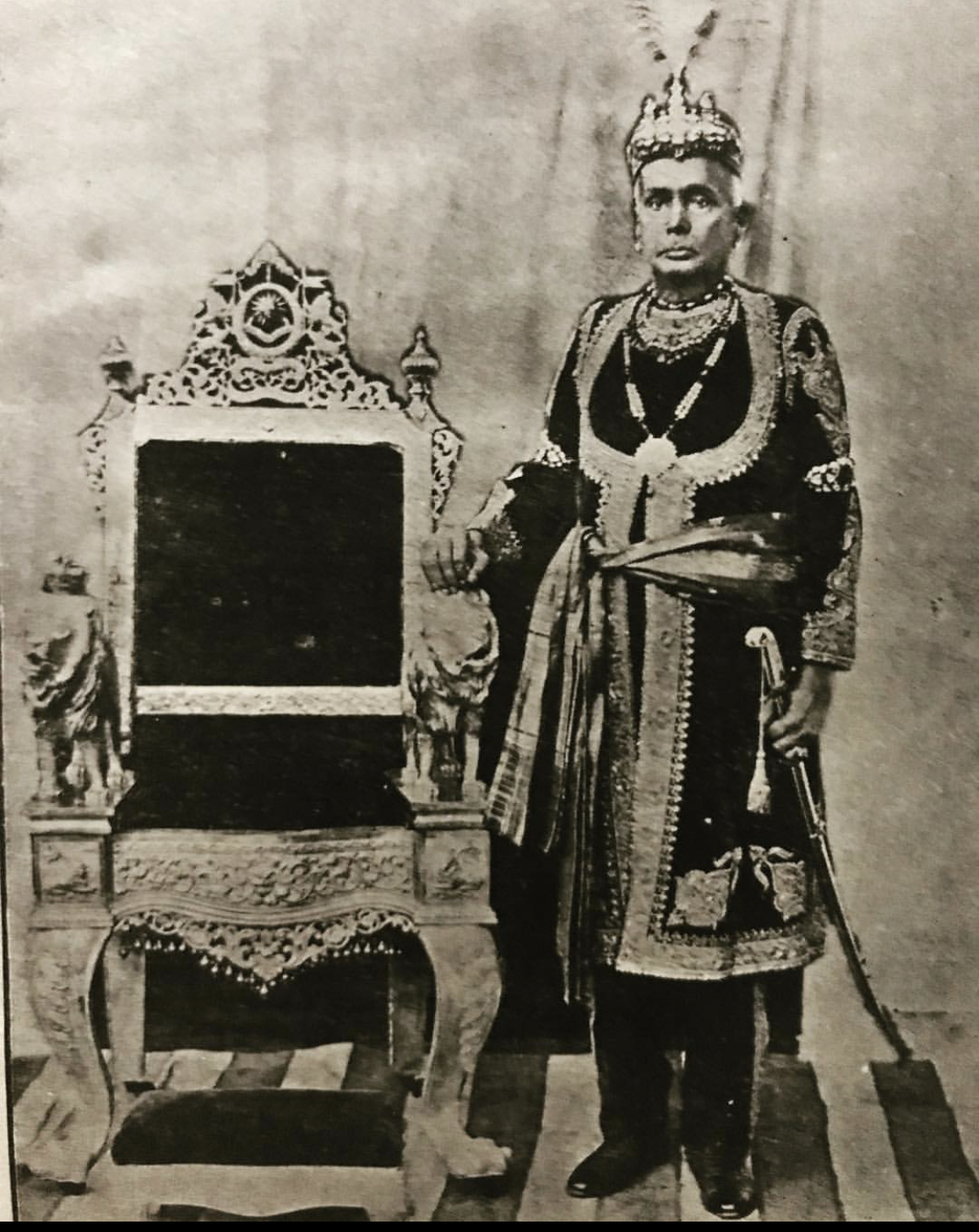
- His Highness Maharajah Vikram Dev Varma Garu
- Predecessor: Maharajah Ram Chandra Dev IV
- Successor: Maharajah Ram Krishna Dev
- Born: 28 June 1869; Srikakulam, now in Andhra Pradesh
- Died: 14 April 1951 (aged 81); Moti Mahal Jeypore
- Spouse: Maharani Hira Devi(consort)
- Issue: Maharajkumari Swarnarekhamani Devi
- Father: Maharajkumar Krishna Chandra Dev
- Mother: Maharani Rekha Devi
- Religion: Hinduism

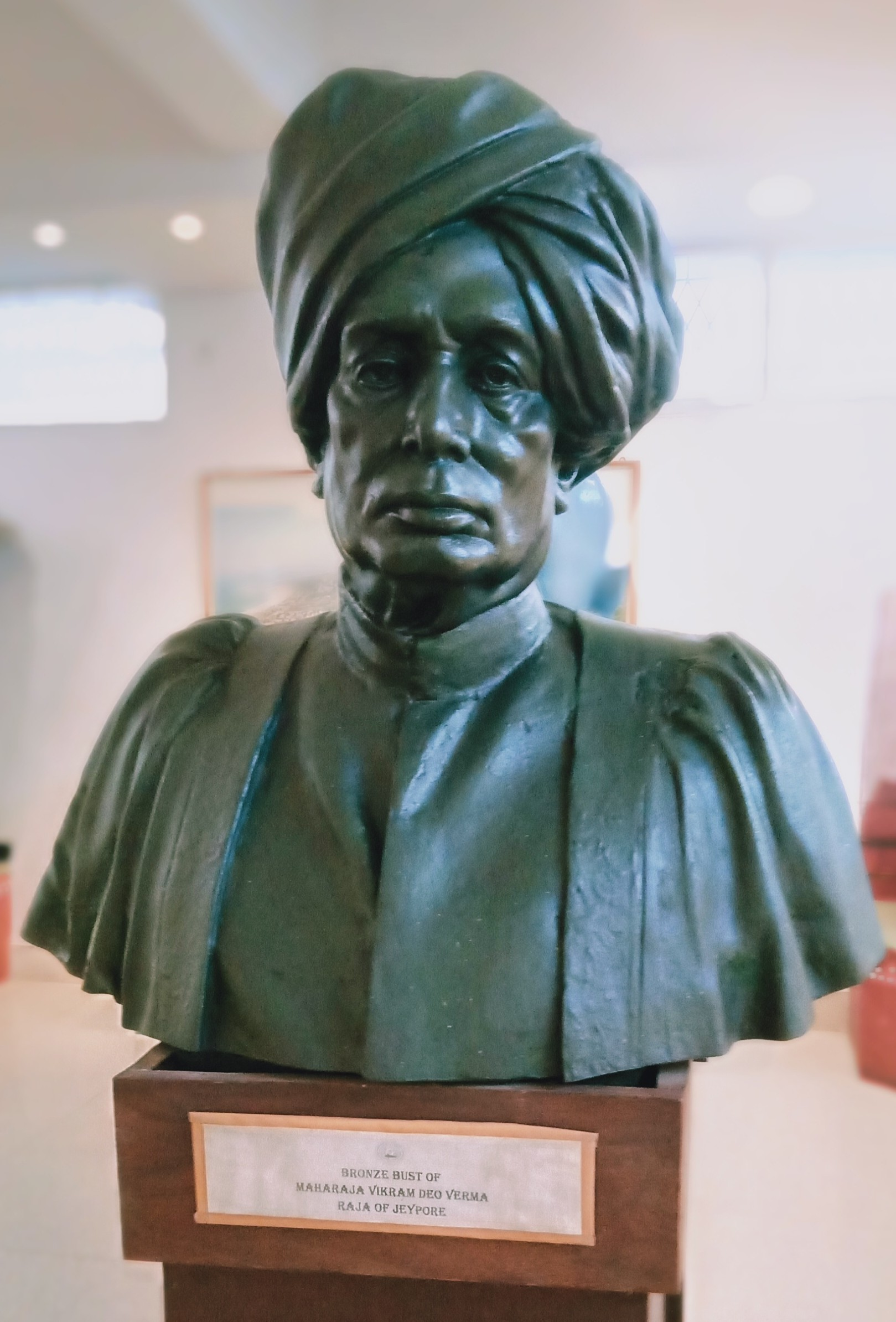
Bronze bust in the Visakha Museum

Maharajah Vikram Dev IV or Vikram Deo Varma (28 June 1869 – 14 April 1951) was last Zamindar of Jeypore Estate of British India. A patron of the arts and literature, he was also a writer and a proficient playwright. He was also an administrator, a magistrate for Visakhapatnam by the Madras government in 1914 and involved in the delineation of the state of Odisha.

== Early life ==
Vikram Dev was born in Sri Mukhalingam Parvatalapeta of Srikakulam Taluk to Rekha Devi and Maharajkumar Krishna Chandra Dev, the junior prince of Jeypore and the younger brother of Maharaja Ram Chandra Dev III. Evidently, due to a family quarrel Krishna Chandra stayed away from Jeypore in the village of Sri Kurmam in Srimukhalingam, Andhra Pradesh. Vikram’s mother died when he was nine and his father died six years later. He was adopted by the Queen of the Matsya Dynasty of Madugula and was known as 'Raja of Vaddadi-Madugula' although this adoption was challenged in court in 1881, the judges retained its validity. He learned English from J.S. Bard at Vizag and became an expert in Telugu, Odia and Sanskrit. He became a writer in all these languages and was awarded an honorary doctor of literature and made a Sahitya Samrat by the Andhra Bharati Tirtha Research University on 6 May 1933. He married the daughter of Sulochana of Nawrangpur who belonged to the royalty of Patna. A philanthropist, he donated to the cause of Andhra University and helped establish various cultural and educational institutions.

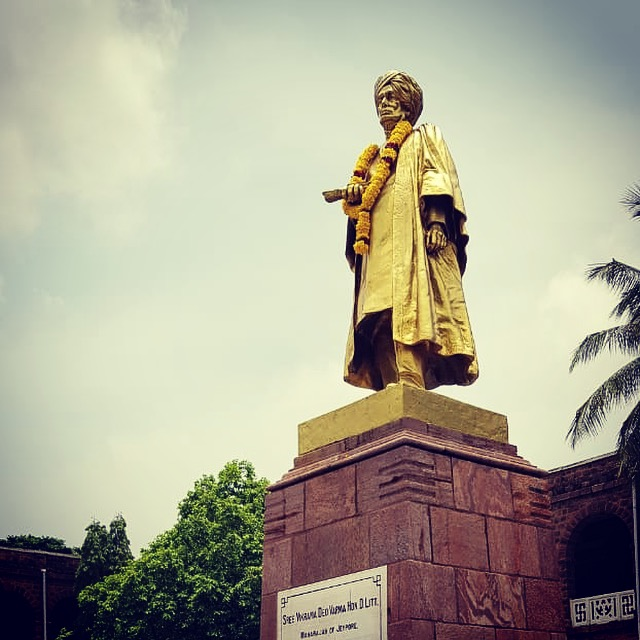
Statue of ‘Sahitya Samarat’ HH Maharajah Vikram Dev IV D.Litt. in Andhra University, Visakhapatnam

== Contribution to Art and Literature ==
Long before he was crowned as the king of Jeypore, Vikram Dev was a renowned scholar who gained expertise in five languages - Sanskrit-Hindi, Odia, Telugu, Bengali and English. He acquired enough fame through his contribution to the combined literature of all these languages. He was awarded the doctorate degree of ‘Kala-Prapūrna’ and the honorary title of 'Sahitya Samrat' by the Andhra Bharati Tirtha Research University in 1933.

He wrote Telugu dramas like ‘Shree Nivas Kalyan Natak’, ‘Krushnarjuna Charitam’ and ‘Manavati Charitam’ that were staged in the iconic 'Jagannmitra Hall' established by the king which was seen as a noble attempt to flourish art and culture among the populace of the city. He annually invited and honored 100 learned scholars from all over India and donated one lac every year to the Andhra University.

He donated two million rupees to fund the Andhra University which was ordered to be shifted to Guntur. He was one of the main writers of newspapers and Journals such as Nav-Bharat, Sahakar, Navin, Shishir, etc. He also contributed to the religious writings by authoring ‘Bhagawad Gita Mahatmya’ his first writing in Odia, ‘Sarasa Gitavali’ in his youth and wrote many strotras Kavacham and Chautisha etc. He served as the pro-chancellor of Utkal University and Andhra University.

== Philanthropist ==
Vikram Dev was an admirer of education and contributed to this cause. He not only saved Andhra University by donating millions but also made sure that it was well established and efficient for his subjects. Therefore, he donated one lac rupees annually to the Andhra University. He donated one lac thirty thousand rupees to the S.C.B. Medical college at Cuttack and few thousand rupees to the post-graduate scholarship to Utkal University.

A major portion of his donations also contributed in laying the foundation of the first theatre hall of Visakhapattnam called 'Jagannmitra Hall' and Jeypore College of Technology and Science. He was the founder of the Jeypore College established in 1947, now known as Vikram Dev University in Jeypore, named in respect of his first cousin and predecessor, Sir Vikram Dev III, now a state public university. He bore all the cost of publications for some renowned writers that he met in his time serving as the pro-chancellor of Andhra University.
