= Vizianagaram Estate =

Feudal estate of the Madras Presidency in India

Coordinates: 18°7′N 83°25′E

- 1591–1949
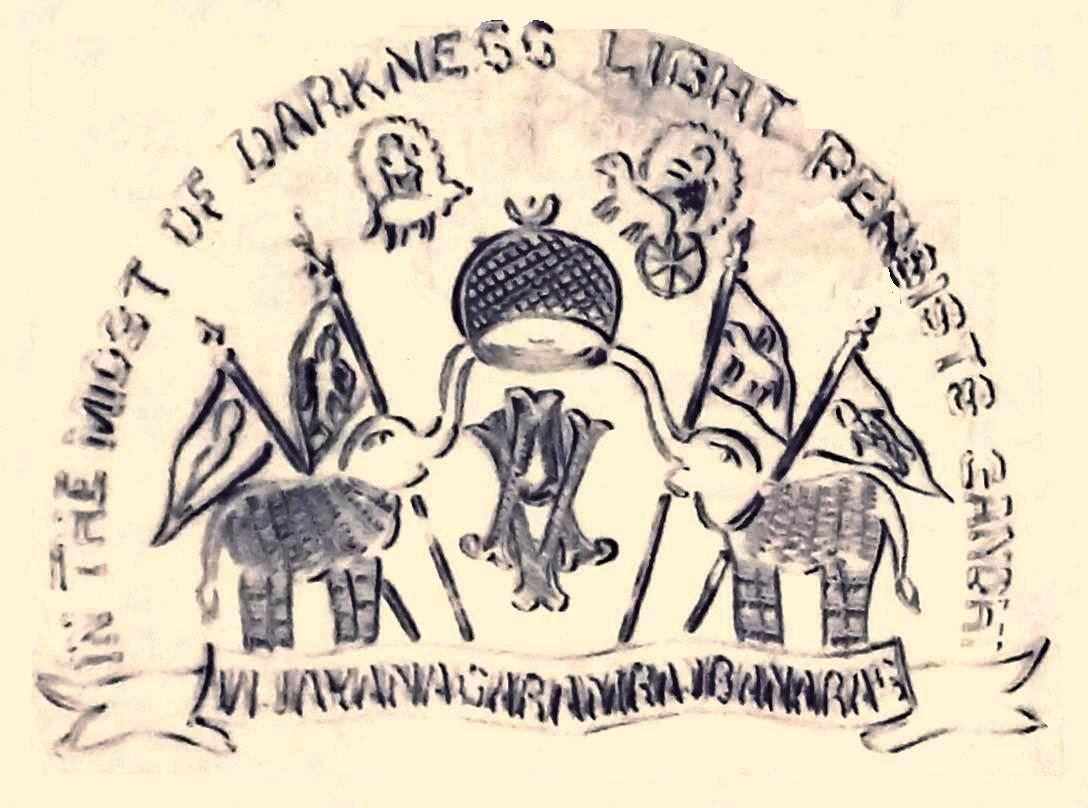
- Coat of arms
- Capital: Vizianagaram
- Population
  - 1901: 900,000
- History
  - Established: 1591
  - Abolition of the estate: 1949
Succeeded by
India
- Today part of: India

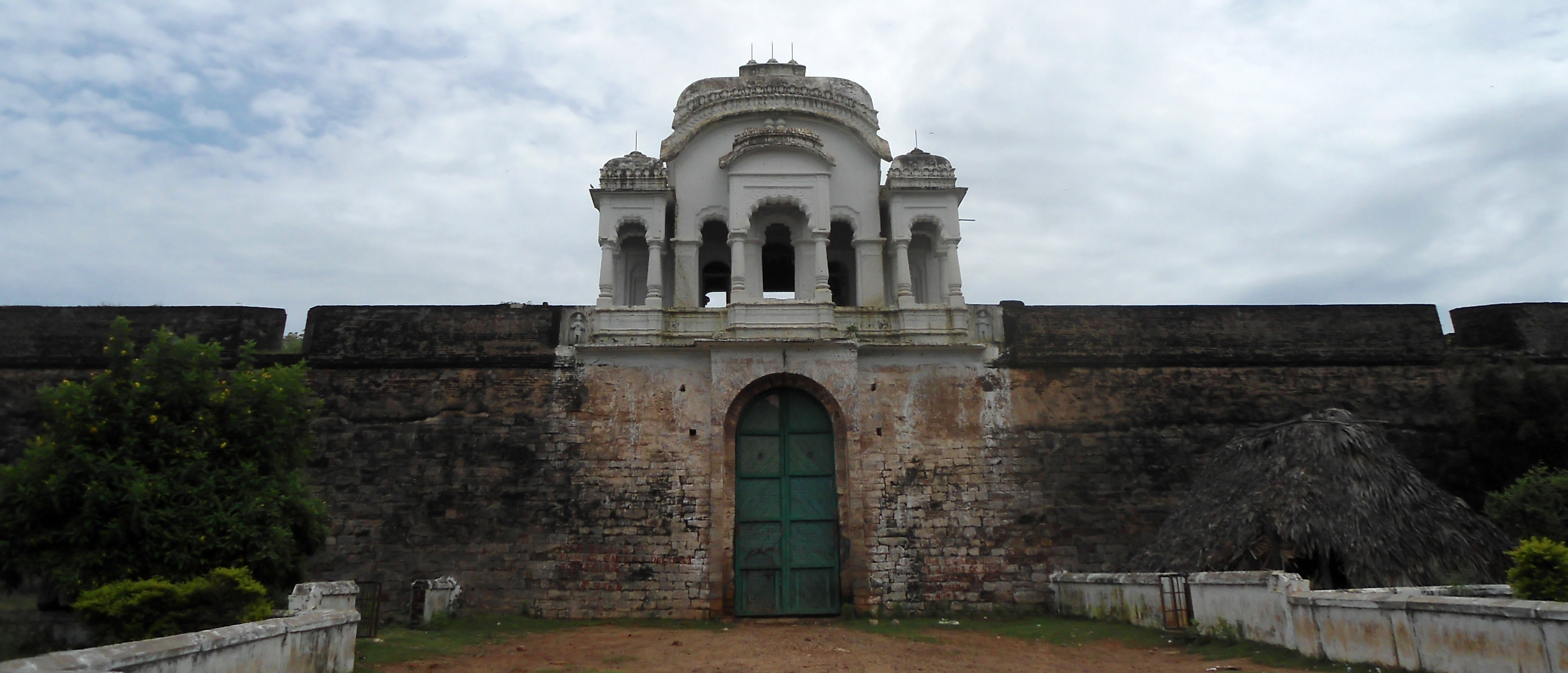
West Entrance of the Vizianagaram fort.

Vizianagaram Estate was a zamindari of the Madras Presidency in India. The name is derived from its founder Raja Vijayaram Raj who established a sovereign kingdom by claiming independence from the kingdom of Jeypore in 1711. It formed alliances with the French and British East India Company to annexe the neighbouring principalities of Bobbili, Kurupam, Paralakhemundi and Jeypore. However, they fell out with the British and as a result were attacked and defeated in the Battle of Padmanabham. They were annexed as a tributary estate like other principalities and remained so, until their accession to the Indian Union in 1949.

== History ==
Amala Raju (Founder of the Vizianagaram branch) of Pericchedi ruling clan built Pusapadu village and started ruling family of 'Pusapati'. He established himself as a tributary of the Kingdom of Jeypore of Odisha.

Vizianagaram was founded named it after Vijay Rama Raju, spelled with a Z to differentiate it from the Vijayanagar Empire in Hampi. They obtained the title of Gajapathi, after aiding the British forces of the Northern Circars against Vikram Dev I of Jeypore Kingdom in the 18th century.

In 1754, Pusapati Vijaya Rama Gajapathi Raju, of the ruling family of Vizianagaram, made an alliance with the French, but a few years later the territory was ceded to the British. It remained under their control until independence in 1947.

Vizianagaram Fort was constructed in the year 1712–1714 A.D. Traditionally five Vijayas or signs of victory were present at the inception of this fortress. It was named Vizia-nagaram (place of victory) after its founder Vijaya Rama Raju and the foundations were laid on Tuesday (Jayavaram in Telugu), the tenth day (Vijayadasami) of the Dasara Festival in the year Vijaya of the Hindu calendar. In 1827 Maharajah Vijay Rama Gajapati Raju III had several honors conferred on him by the British Government. Lord Northbrook obtained for him the title of His Highness, and had his name enrolled among those of chiefs entitled to return visits from the Viceroy.

The revenue of the estate is nearly about 26lakhs by 1938 and nearly about 30 lakhs by the time of abolition. They paid a peskash of 4,96,580/- by 1877.

After the Battle of Padmanabham they were reduced from the position of Princely State to Zamindari of the Madras Presidency in 1794 and made the Permanent settlement in the year 1802–03. They were also conferred with Maharaja titles .

== List of title-holders ==
The prominent people who have held this title include :

1. Pusapati Sitaram Chandra Raju
2. Pusapati Amala Gajapati Raju
3. Pusapati Rachi Gajapati Raju
4. Pusapati Tama Gajapati Raju
5. Pusapati Vijayarama Gajapati Raju I
6. Pusapati Ananda Gajapati Raju
7. Pusapati Vijayarama Gajapathi Raju II (1760–1794)
8. Pusapati Narayanadev Gajapati Raju (1794–1845)
9. Pusapati Vijayarama Gajapati Raju III (1845–1879)
10. Sir Pusapati Ananda Gajapati Raju II (1850–1897)
11. Pusapati Vijayarama Gajapati Raju IV (1897–1922)
12. Pusapati Alak Narayanadev Gajapati Raju (1922–1937)
13. Pusapati Vijayarama Gajapati Raju V (1945–1995). His eldest son is Ananda (below) and second son is Ashok Gajapati Raju, the cabinet minister.

=== Other prominent members ===
- P.S. Kumaraswamy Raja – Former chief minister of Madras State (1949–1952) and governor of Odisha (1954–1956).
- Vijayananda Gajapathi Raju, better known as Vizzy, a politician and former cricket captain of India, was the Maharajkumar (prince) of Vizianagram, being the second son of Maharaja Vijayarama Gajapati Raju IV (1897–1922).
- Pusapati Ananda Gajapathi Raju (1950–2016), elder son of Pusapati Vijayarama Gajapati Raju and former Chairman of Simhachalam temple trust board and MANSAS (1995–2016)
- Ashok Gajapati Raju, younger son of Pusapati Vijayarama Gajapati Raju, is a prominent politician and the Union Cabinet Minister for Civil Aviation in the Narendra Modi cabinet. Chairman of Simhachalam temple trust board and MANSAS (2016–20, 2021–present).
- Uma Gajapathi Raju, former wife of Pusapati Ananda Gajapathi Raju and former MP of Visakhapatnam
- Sanchaita Gajapathi Raju, daughter of Pusapati Ananda Gajapathi Raju and former Chairman of Simhachalam temple trust board and MANSAS (2020–21).
- Vidya Gajapathi Raju Singh, daughter of Pusapati Vishweswar Gajapathi Raju, brother of Raja Saheb P.V.G Raju.

== See also ==
- Battle of Padmanabham
- List of zamindari estates in Madras Presidency
