= Vikram Dev =

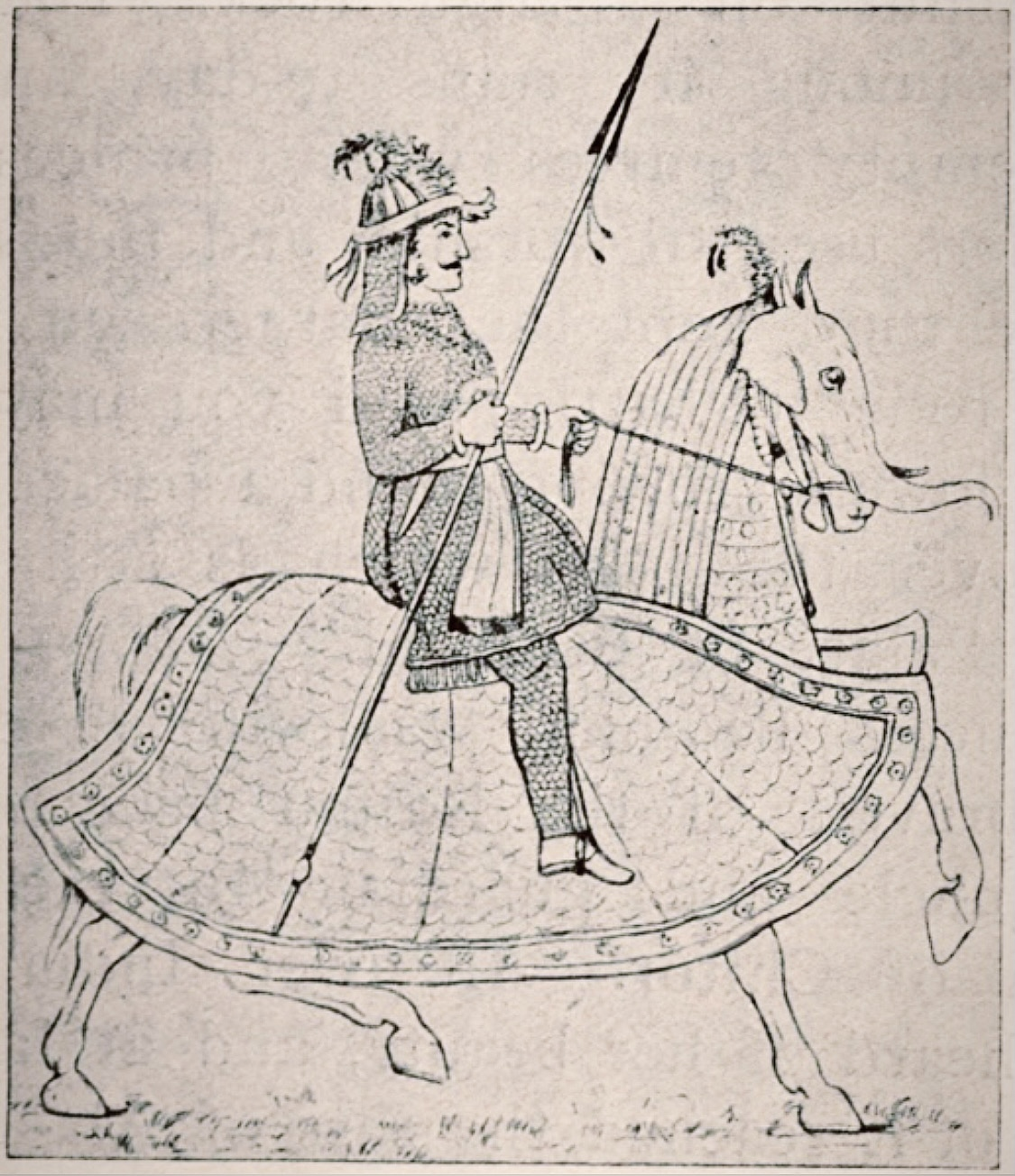
- Vikram Dev

Raja of Jeypore
- Reign: 1758–1781
- Predecessor: Lal Krishna Dev
- Successor: Ram Chandra Dev II
- Ministers: Jagannath Patro
- Born: 20 December 1701; Fort Purnagadh, Jeypore
- Died: 1 July 1781 (aged 79); Jeypore
- Spouse: Lalitamani Patta Devi
- Issue: Ram Chandra Dev II
- Father: Raghunath Krishna Dev
- Mother: Rukmani Devi
- Religion: Hinduism

Vikram Dev I or Vikram Dev was the ruler of Jeypore from 1758 to 1781. He succeeded his brother Lal Krishna Dev. He retransferred the capital from Narayanapatna to Jeypore which had been deserted from the time of Balaram Dev in 1711. In the last years of his reign, the kingdom was demoted to a zamindari after they were defeated by the British.

== Reign ==
He married Lalitamani Devi, the granddaughter of Raja Udaya Singh of Kalahandi and consolidated his friendship with the ruler of that state. Vikram Dev had a strong army and he stationed a troop of 4000 to guard between Jeypore and Narayanpatna. The French, who led an expedition through Malkangiri, were driven out by his army and he also successfully hurled back the Marathas, who once marched as far as Umarkot.

In 1768 Vijayarama Raju II, the ruler of Vizianagaram claimed the Jeypore territory under an alleged grant in 1752 by Salabatjung, the then Subedar of the Deccan. It was during the course of this disturbance that the British first asserted their authority over Jeypore by sending a body of troops. By 15 January 1775 they took possession of Rayagada and by the last week of February they besieged the fort of Jeypore and defeated the Maratha troops who rushed in to help.

=== Conquest of Kotpad ===
In 1777, Raja Daryao Deo of Bastar was ousted by his brother Raja Ajmer Singh and the former absconded to Jeypore seeking shelter in the fort of Vikram Dev. Essentially, Raja Daryao was accompanied by Vikram Dev to the capital of Bastar with one hundred cavalry, one hundred swordsmen, twelve thousand infantry, twenty canons and fifteen war elephants and was further joined by thousands of rebel soldiers. The defense of Ajgar Singh collapsed in a day and Daryao Deo was reinstalled on the throne of Bastar. The tract of Kotpad was presented to Vikram Dev for his services.

== Death ==
Vikram Dev died in 1781 and was succeeded by Ram Chandra Dev II.
