= Hawa Mahal, Visakhapatnam =

Historic summer palace in Andhra Pradesh, India

Hawa Mahal Palace
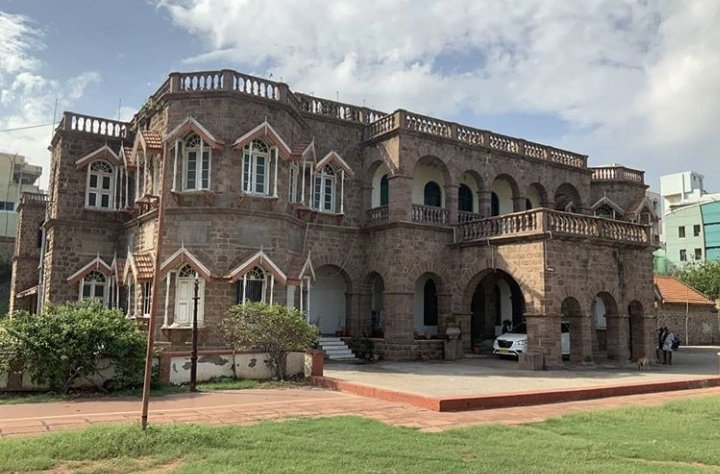
- Hawa Mahal, Visakhapatnam
- Interactive map of the Hawa Mahal Palace area

General information
- Type: Beach Palace
- Architectural style: Indo-Gothic architecture
- Location: Beach Road, Visakhapatnam; Andhra Pradesh, India
- Coordinates: 17.707458°N 83.311838°E
- Construction started: 1917
- Completed: 1923
- Owner: Maharaja of Jeypore

Design and construction
- Architect: Muppidi Venkat Rao
- Main contractor: Maharajah Ram Chandra Dev IV

Hawa Mahal meaning 'palace of winds' is a summer residential palace of the royal family of Jeypore. It was built in 1917-1923 by Maharaja Ram Chandra Dev IV at Beach Road, Visakhapatnam. It is considered one of the most iconic historical buildings of the city. It is owned by the Maharaja of Jeypore.

== History ==
The foundation of this iconic beach palace was laid down by Maharajah Ram Chandra Dev IV in 1917. It was built as a summer resort and often a transit halt for the Maharajas of Jeypore when they travelled to the capital of the presidency in Madras. The Raja of Salur owned a sea-facing land which was purchased by the Maharaja of Jeypore for constructing the palace. There was an uneven hillock on the acquired land which was levelled and the front land was filled up in order to build the palace above sea-level. The contract of building the palace was given to a young and dynamic architect called Muppidi Venkat Rao.

This royal building has hosted eminent personalities like the first Prime Minister of India - Jawaharlal Nehru, the first President of India - Rajendra Prasad, Nobel Laureate and poet Rabindranath Tagore, the Vice-chancellor of Andhra University and the second president of India, Dr. Sarvepalli Radhakrishnan, famous Hindi film actress Waheeda Rahman.

== Architecture ==
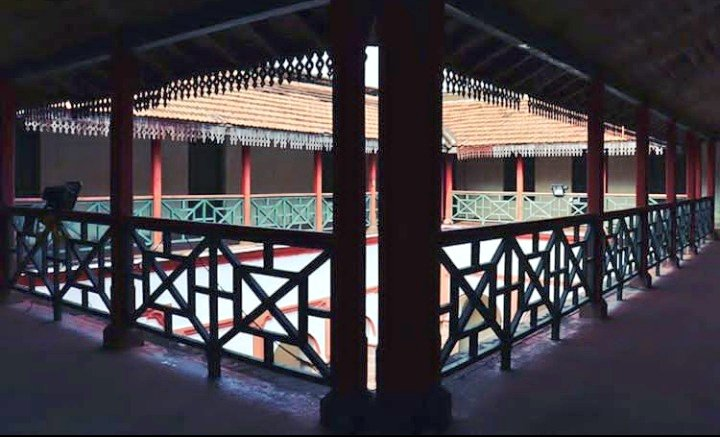
The interior portion of Hawa Mahal, Visakhapatnam

The palace is a Indo-Gothic architecture that was prevalent in 19th century. It is a unique two storied symmetrical building made of stone with twin octagonal projections on either side. The wooden windows are framed by segmented arched openings and the high Madras roofing within the halls are extensively employed by Burma teak to ensure cool comfort during the scorching hot summers of the Eastern Coast. The main structure has semi-circular arched verandahs and the rectangular wooden windows in the central porch with ventilators leading into the palace. The building has sixteen rooms and a massive hall that hosted dinners and parties for the royal guests.

Special care was taken to have straight cut khondalite stones to build the façade. The balustrades of the stone railing are cut to precision and fixed without any support of metal rods. The palace complex is divided into parts - main residence of the royal family and the kitchen rooms, servant quarters, car garages and manager's residence room. The pillars in the verandah are formed of large square columns of stones with interlocking system in the center. There are intermittent semi-circular arches at doorways and windows of the load bearing walls. The interior walls of the rooms are decorated with Italian tiles and the flooring is made up of Italian marble and Indian granite. Burma teak doors and windows are adorned with stained Italian glass. The central courtyard provides light and breeze to all rooms located all around it.

There are two octagonal shaped guard rooms on the front side of the palace that were guarded by sentries. After independence, a large portion of the palace was taken over by the government in order to build the Beach Road. Two cannons were placed on top of the guard rooms and two Grecian statues of sentries were placed on both sides of the finely crafted wooden main gate. Reportedly, this wooden gate took one and a half year to construct.

== In popular culture ==
The palace is considered an iconic historical site of Visakhapatnam, therefore, it has featured in both Hindi and Telugu cinema. The Kamal Haasan starrer Ek Duuje Ke Liye showed the building in some songs. In 2017, the blockbuster Singam 3 directed by Hari starring Suriya, Anushka Shetty and Shruti Haasan portrayed the palace as a police station.
