= Battle of Padmanabham =

1794 battle in India

- Part of Expansion of the East India Company
Date	10 July 1794
Location	Padmanabham (now Visakhapatnam district)
Result	Vizianagaram estate comes under Company rule

Belligerents
Vizianagaram estate	East India Company

Commanders and leaders
Vijayram Raj II	Colonel Pendargast

Casualties and losses
Severe loss of soldiers, including a Chinna Vijayaramaraju.	

The Battle of Padmanabha took place in Padmanabham, Visakhapatnam district (modern Andhra Pradesh, India), on 10 July 1794. This was a battle between King of Vizianagaram led by Vijayram Raj II and East India Company Madras Presidency Forces led by Colonel Pendargast under the command of British Governor of Madras, Sir Charles Oakly. The British emerged victoriously and the King was shot dead in the middle of battle.

As a consequence of the war, Vizianagaram was occupied by East India Company and became a tributary estate or Zamindari.

== The causes of war ==
By 1768, the tribal areas such as Parlakimidi, Ganjam, Mohiri, Gunsuru, and Pratapagiri were ruled by 20 Zamindars. They have 34 forts and maintained approximately 35,000 armed troops. Many of these jamindars revolted against the English East India Company. Some of the castles were located in the hills of the manyam. Therefore, the defeated rebel Zamindars retreated into the Hill fortress

After the death of Ananda Gajapatiraju, Vijayaramaraju became Rajah of the Vizianagaram Zamindari. Still, he was a boy. So Sitaramaraju was appointed as divan, the step brother. When Rajah came to age, he removed Sitaramaraju from Diwani. Diwan was angered by this action, he formed an alliance with the English.

The British attempted to increase payment of peskas from Vijayanagara Zamindar and to reduce the strength of his army and ordered him to pay his dues of 8,50,000 peskas. Rajah argued that he had no dues, the British had captured Vijayanagara on 2 August 1793. British ordered that Vijayaramaraju must go to exile Masulipatnam with the pension of Rs 1200 per month. However, Vijayaramaraju refused these orders and he went to Padmanabham located between the Bhimunipatnam and Vizianagaram with 1000 troops. The British troops defeated the Vizianagaram army and Chinavijayaramaraju died due to bullet injury in the battle. The battle only lasted one and a half hours and the British lost 13 soldiers.

== Aftermath ==
After the death of Vijayaramaraju, his son Narayanababu found shelter in Makkuva village. The konda doras and sardars supported him. In the end, he made a treaty with the British and agreed to pay 5 million peskas.

After that British occupied Vijayanagara Town. But they returned Zamindari to Narayanababu. They renewed the zamindars lands and deprived them of their unique venture of Rebellion. By 1802, Britishers implemented the permanent tax system for zamindaris.

A book on the battle written by Challapragada Satyanarayana Murthy and published by the Telugu Academy was released in 2003 by Ashok Gajapathi Raju.
