= Mondei =

Mondei is an Adivasi tribal festival observed in the Nabarangpur district of Odisha, India. Its name is derived from the word mandi, which means a small market in Hindi language. Tribes traditionally celebrate this festival during the harvesting season at different locations in the Nabarangpur district. It also has significance in some other Odisha districts and elsewhere in Chhattisgarh State.

Tribes such as the Gond, the Paraja, the Bhotoda, the Gadoba and the Kandha get together on a particular day to exchange their agricultural produce. Near their village deity they worship their first harvest and then go to sell their paddy, maize and vegetables. It is a huge gathering of people from all nearby villages. Some cultural dance programmes are also organized by the convenors.

The District Administration of Nabarangpur has initiated an effort to promote this festival, and have placed its identity on a State as well as a National Level. In the first week of November each year, a festival is organized with the association of the Culture Department, Govt of Orissa, at the District Headquarters. Tribal dances from the interior belt of the Nabarangpur district are displayed to the invitees from different parts of the nation. Also, cultural exchange takes place between the artists of different regions.
