= Vikram Dev University =

Public university in Odisha, India

Coordinates: 18.8678°N 82.5723°E

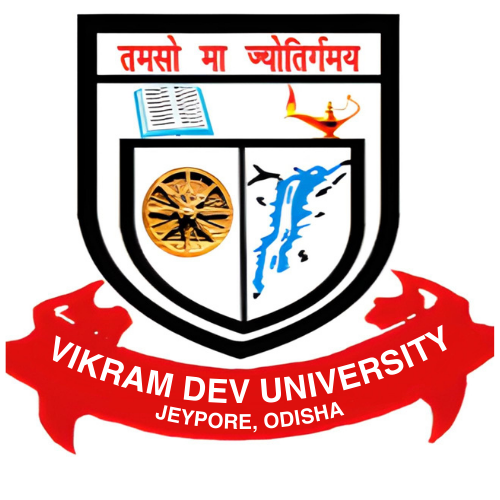
- Other name: VDU
- Former names: Jeypore College (1947–1964); Vikram Dev Autonomous College (1964–2023)
- Motto: tamaso mā jyotirgamaya (Sanskrit)
- Motto in English: "From darkness lead me to light"
- Established: 1947; 79 years ago (as College); 2023; 3 years ago (as University)
- Founder: Maharaja Sri Vikram Deo Verma of Jeypore Kingdom
- Accreditation: NAAC
- Affiliations: UGC
- Chancellor: Governor of Odisha
- Vice-Chancellor: Hrushikesh Senapaty
- Faculty: 51
- Location: Jeypore, Odisha, India
- Campus: 25 acres (10 ha); Urban
- Youth Groups: NCC, YRC, NSS
- Website: vikramdevuniversity.ac.in

Vikram Dev University (formerly Vikram Deb Autonomous College) is a public state university located in the city of Jeypore, Koraput district in Odisha, that offers courses primarily at undergraduate and postgraduate levels. It was established in 1947 by Maharaja of Jeypore Sri Vikram Dev IV or Vikram Deo Verma as Jeypore College and later named after him.

== History ==
=== Foundation ===
As a part of welfare activities of the British-Indian government, on 1 July 1947 the government of Jeypore Estate (Orissa Province) under Maharaja Vikram Deo Verma started this institution of higher education at Jeypore as 'Jeypore College'. As a tribute to his philanthropy the college was renamed to 'Vikram Deb College' in 1961. The college was also upgraded to a first grade college from 1961 and undergraduate courses were started. Honours teaching provisions were made in 1968–73 and Post Graduate courses were started from 1979. The college was declared a lead college in 1991–92.

== Upgradation and expansion (1961–2023) ==
In 1961, Vikram Dev College was upgraded to a First Grade College.

To further broaden its academic offerings, the college introduced undergraduate classes in Science and Humanities streams in 1961 and 1963, respectively.

The college implemented honors teaching between 1968 and 1973.

In 1979, Vikram Dev College took a step forward with the initiation of post-graduate studies in the Department of History.

Building upon the success of the post-graduate program in History, the college expanded its offerings in subsequent years. Post-graduate studies were introduced in Economics, Commerce, and Political Science in 1983 and 1990, respectively.

In 1983, Vikram Dev College introduced higher secondary streams in Arts, Science, and Commerce.

The year 1993-94 witnessed another milestone in the college's journey as post-graduate studies in Chemistry were initiated.

In response to heavy demand from students, academics, and the general public, the college was declared as an affiliating university by the Chief Minister of Odisha, Naveen Patnaik, on 2 February 2023. The university came into function from 1 June 2023.

== Affiliated colleges ==
The university has jurisdiction over 4 districts namely Koraput, Malkangiri, Nabarangpur and Rayagada of Odisha. Earlier the jurisdiction of these districts presided over by Berhampur University.

== See also ==
- Higher education in Odisha
- Jeypore
