= Pendrani =

Goddess worshipped in India

The goddess Pendrani is a legendary deity of Umerkote, a town in Nabarangpur District of Odisha, India. A temple has been constructed at west end of the town in order to create a place for worshipping for the locals. Sunday is the only weekday on which the temple remains open. People from far away places visit the goddess.

Maa Pendrani of Umerkote is born out of a legend. A small village Pendra (Pendrahandi) near Umerkote worship a pure soul Pendrani, a married girl who was a victim of secret jealousy of her own brothers. As the story goes, her husband was overtly pampered by her parents who made him stay in their household with no work to bother about. The four brothers out of sheer jealousy conspired and succeeded in killing her innocent husband (Pendara) and buried him in their field. Sensing a foul play, Pendrani could unfold the heinous crime and apparently jumped into her husband’s funeral pyre and perished in its flames. Days later her spirit was believed to roam about the villages helping those who trusted her supernatural transformation. People adore her sacrifice and worship in a temple erected at Umerkote. That the local degree College is named after her is a tribute to the saga of supreme sacrifice.

Her holy grace attracts many people from surrounding locations. During the time of Ratha Yatra at Umerkote, people celebrate the annual fair near the temple. People from nearby villages come and visit the celebration which includes bazaars and mandi and exchange of cultural factors among tribal and urban people.

The Goddess had been worshipped on an open citadel which gradually has been made with a normal wooden chamber. With the help of locals a newly built temple has been dedicated for worshipping the goddess with a grand inaugural celebration from 20 to 30 June 2010.

Another legend related to the origin of Maa Pendrani is as follows: Goddess Pendragarhien, also known as Pendrani, is worshipped by the tribal people of Western Odisha and the bordering districts of Chhattisgarh. It has a history of last 400 years. A myth of origin of Goddess Pendrani; followed by a complex ritual, is found in these areas.

The focal theme of the myth was about a Gond bride Pendrani; whose husband (bride service) was killed by her seven brothers in order to get good harvest by offering human sacrifice to Earth Mother Goddess. Pendrani, searched for her husband and finally found that her own brothers had sacrificed her bride service- husband. While wondering in the forest a tiger ate her and after that her spirit became a Goddess. Over a period of last 400 years she has transformed from a revengeful goddess into a blissful goddess. She is now worshipped as the Goddess of wealth in Western Odisha and eastern Chhattisgarh.

The purpose of the article is to explain how an ordinary woman became a Goddess and contested against the male predominance. Her creation myth became so popular that she became a popular Goddess and thus a new cult emerged as Pendrani Goddess cult. Though originated as a tribal Goddess she became the Goddess of both tribal and non tribal communities in the socio historical process of the region. The cult represented with the religious faith and belief explores that now Pendrani is one of the most popular and prestigious Goddess. A huge temple is constructed in Umerkote town, in addition to installation of her cult in thousands of villages in tribal areas. An attempt has been made in this paper to examine the socio–historical processes of the indigenous communities and the dynamics of transformation of a woman to goddess in the collective memory of the communities. The ritual performance of the celebration and adoption of the Goddess in a house or in a village is a complex ritual process that captures the socio–psychological phenomena. Male shamans use to play the role of the Goddess and the divinization of Pendrani Goddess is established.

The inference of the Pendrani cult is a contestation of male predominance over the women and the whole ritual system adopted in the cult, celebrated by the males playing the role of female goddess signifies the males subjugation to the woman Goddess, thereby compensating the injustice inflicted on Goddess Pendrani when she was an ordinary woman; before her deification.
