= Vaddadi =

Vaddadi is name of a village in Andhra Pradesh and Telangana. Vaddadi is also a Telugu surname. Notable people with the surname include:

- Vaddadi Papaiah (1921–1992), painter, cover artist, and illustrator
- Vaddadi Subbarayudu (1854–1938), Indian Telugu writer and translator
