= Vishwanath Dev Gajapati =

- Nauna-Gajapati

Raja of Nandapur
- Reign: 1527–1571
- Predecessor: Bhairava Dev
- Successor: Balaram Dev I
- Born: 1500; Nandapur, Odisha
- Died: 1571 (aged 70–71); Rayagada, Odisha
- Issue: Balaram Dev I
- Father: Bhairava Dev
- Religion: Hinduism

Vishwanath Dev Gajapati was the king of Jeypore who established a kingdom in the region of southern Odisha and northern Andhra Pradesh. The Silavamsa king Pratap Ganga Raja died without any male heir, only leaving behind his wife and daughter Lilavati who married Vinayak Dev, the ruler Gudari and Great Grandfather of Vishwanath Dev Gajapati.

== Early life ==
Vishwanath Dev was the son of Bhairav Dev of Nandapur, a feudatory of Prataprudra Deva who defended Kondapalli Fort against Krishna Deva Raya's invasion in 1516 CE and constructed a reservoir called Bhairava Sagar in Bobbili. He shifted his capital to Rayagada for better economic prospects in trade and agriculture and built a mud fort. He also constructed many temples along Nagavali River including the Majhighariani Temple. During his reign Shri Chaitanya migrated southwards and the title of Nauna Gajapati or "no less than a Gajapati" was adopted by the royal dynasty of Nandapur, but after the accession of Govinda Vidyadhara he seems to have submitted to the sovereign authority of the Bhoi dynasty.

== Death and aftermath ==
Vishwanath Dev consolidated his kingdom but by 1550 lost the regions between Krishna and Godavari to Qutb Shahi dynasty. After his death in 1571, Ibrahim Qutb Shah invaded the kingdom and incorporated their territories into Golconda Sultanate.
