= Purunagarh =

17th century fortification in Odisha, India

- Jayapur Durg, Jayapur Garh, Purnagadh
- Part of Kingdom of Jeypore (Kalinga)
- Jeypore, Odisha, India
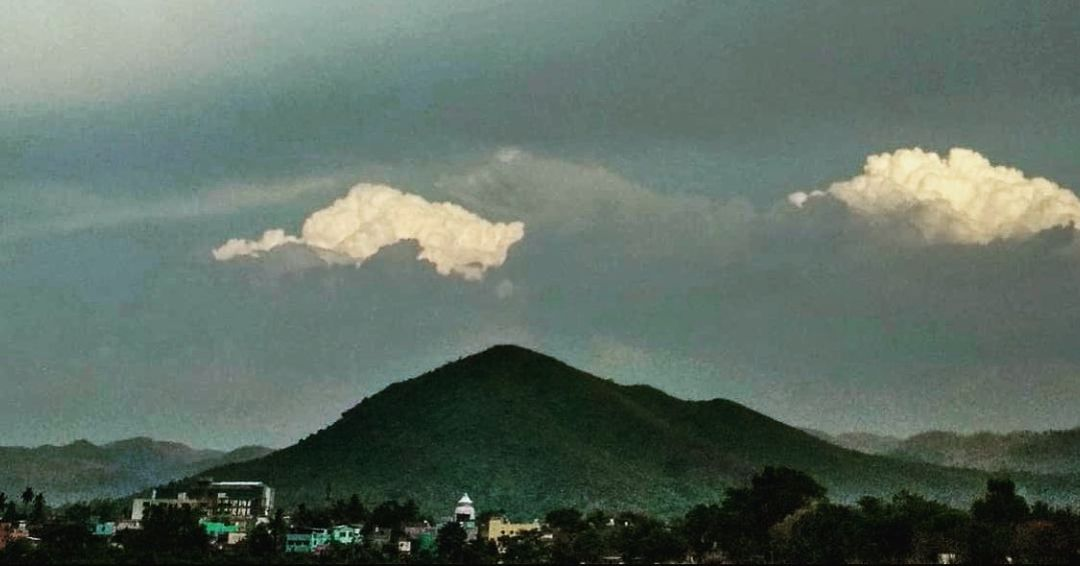
- Location of the fort, Naktidongar Hill

Site information
- Type: Hill Fortification
- Controlled by: Jeypore Municipality
- Open to the public: Yes
- Condition: Ruins

Location
- Location of Purunagarh
- Coordinates: 18°51′55″N 82°34′23″E

Site history
- Built: 17th century
- Built by: Vir Vikram Dev
- Demolished: 1777
- Battles/wars: 1
- Events: Destruction of the Fort by the East India Company forces under Captain Richard Matthews

Garrison information
- Occupants: Jeypore’s old population

Purunagada or Purnagarh (lit. 'Old Fort') is the easternmost locality of Jeypore in Odisha, India. It is a place of historical significance as it was once the main fort of the Maharajas of Jeypore. It was constructed by Maharaja Vir Vikram Dev after he shifted the capital of his kingdom from Nandapur to Jeypore. In modern era, the place is known for its numerous ancient temples built by the erstwhile kings.

== History ==
Vir Vikram Dev replaced his uncle Krishna Raj Dev as the king of Nandapur in 1637. The kingdom of Nandapur was then resisting as a tributary of the Qutb Shahi dynasty of Hyderabad. However, the growing tensions between Nandapur and Hyderabad forced the Qutb Shahi Sultans to take stringent steps in order to maintain control over the territory of Kalinga. They constantly interfered into the politics of Nandapur that vexed the courtiers and the subjects.

Due to these interferences and skirmishes, the king shifted his capital to a new place and named it Jayapura or "City of Victory". The foot of the Naktidongar hill was chosen as an adequate place for constructing the fort. Historically, the construction of the garrison was finished in the mid-17th century. A long and wide moat was dug surrounding the fort which is now modernized into a canal by the government. The king invited many people from different parts to settle down in the fort, like Brahmin, Vaishya and Khandayats. The largest and most significant population was that of the different tribal communities like the popular Parajas.

The fort was then known as Jaypur Garh and it served as a robust bastion for the next eleven descendants of Vir Vikram Dev. However, the British invaded Jeypore in 1777 assisted by the army of Vizianagaram and destroyed the fort in the absence of Vikram Dev I who was preparing for the battle in the fort of Rayagada.

== People ==
People belonging to different caste, creed and religion have been living in Purunagada and most of them have been staying here for generations. Tribal Parajas form an integral part of this part of the town and were earlier known for their hunting skills, clean houses, robust physique, unique traditions and hard work. With exposure to the urban way of life, their dependence on the forests has been declining and has eroded their culture and heritage.

== Parajas ==
Paraja is a tribe found in the southern part of Orissa and some other parts of the Dandakaranya region. Their appearance is different from the other tribes (without the aborigines features) and have a distinct appearance and lifestyle. Their skin colour can vary from fair (cream) to ebony black. Hair strands are normally straight. Eyes are sunken deeper but not as hollow as other tribes. The average height of the Parajas is around 1.6 m. Parajas have a very rigid societal structure and do not eat at even Brahmin households. With time, this has become a forgotten practice and many tribal now do not even know about such rituals.

== Temples ==
=== Dangar Devi ===
Dedicated to the local goddess said to be an incarnation of Maa Durga, this temple attracts people far and wide for the belief that wishes come true here. This temple belongs to the tribals of the Paraja Tribe and the priest (the most famous being Jaani himself) is a tribal. People of all beliefs come to seek answers and blessings of Maa Dongar Dei. Saddled on a small hillock belonging to the famous Nakti Dangar, the temple was once surrounded by the very famous and rarely found Hathijhula (Hathi - Elephant; Jhula - swing) trees. The branches - like very thick strong ropes - of these trees were huge and long, intertwined so densely that their origins and endings could not be identified easily. Folklore says that these branches could even support huge loads equaling the weight of an elephant without snapping. Now only a few of these trees remain to be seen.

Dongar Devi temple, like many other temples dedicated to Goddesses, is witness to regular animal sacrifice, mostly fowls. This owes to the belief that when someone has a fervent wish, one must be prepared to give something precious too. Tribals come to this temple even to find a cure to their diseases, for better agricultural yields, rains, money, etc. Many affluent families of the undivided Koraput district also visit this temple to sort out their problems and seek the blessings of Mother Dongar Devi.

=== Neelakantheswara Temple ===
The Neelakantheswara Temple is the oldest temple in Purunagoda and Jeypore. The NKT road owes its name to this temple, which has become synonymous with Purunagoda. The temple also has a Jagannath temple and a very rare Radha Krishna temple within the premises. The Neelakantheswara Temple was discovered by a woodcutter who accidentally hit on the Shiva Linga. The mark could still be seen today.

=== Dakshina Kali Temple ===
Contrary to popular belief that Dakshin refers to the direction South, Dakshin in Daksinakali refers to the 'right side', because of the idol of Goddess Kali has her right leg on Lord Shiva. This ancient temple stands for the royal connection of Purunagarh, being the ancestral Goddess (Istadevi) of the kings of Jeypore. Dense trees fill the temple premises with peace and tranquility, and an eerie silence could be felt in the temple even during the day time. Huge drums belonging to the past era and magnificent, larger-than-life paintings adorning the walls of the sanctum on all sides, make visiting this temple a daunting task for the weak hearted and people with the slightest of guilt. The temple is famous far and wide with people thronging to this place in huge numbers, particularly during the ritualistic Dussehra. Innumerable tales about the fiery nature of the Goddess, her bent head, animal sacrifice, punishments doled out to the sinners, of her relationship with the priests, the royal family and the people are abound regarding this temple.

=== Ganga Mata Temple ===
One of the few temples found dedicated to Goddess Ganga. It is here that the ritualistic Ghanta Paraba - a festival similar to Bonalu where a representation of each goddess of a particular locality is taken in a clay pot to other parts to be worshiped - begins at Purunagoda. The procession begins only after a flower drops from the Goddess' head. Though debilitated and deserted for most part of the year, this temple and the festival is the essence of Purunagoda's tradition.
