= Majhighariani Temple =

Maa Majhighariani Temple
- Odia : ମା ମଝୀଘରିଆଣୀ ମନ୍ଦିର
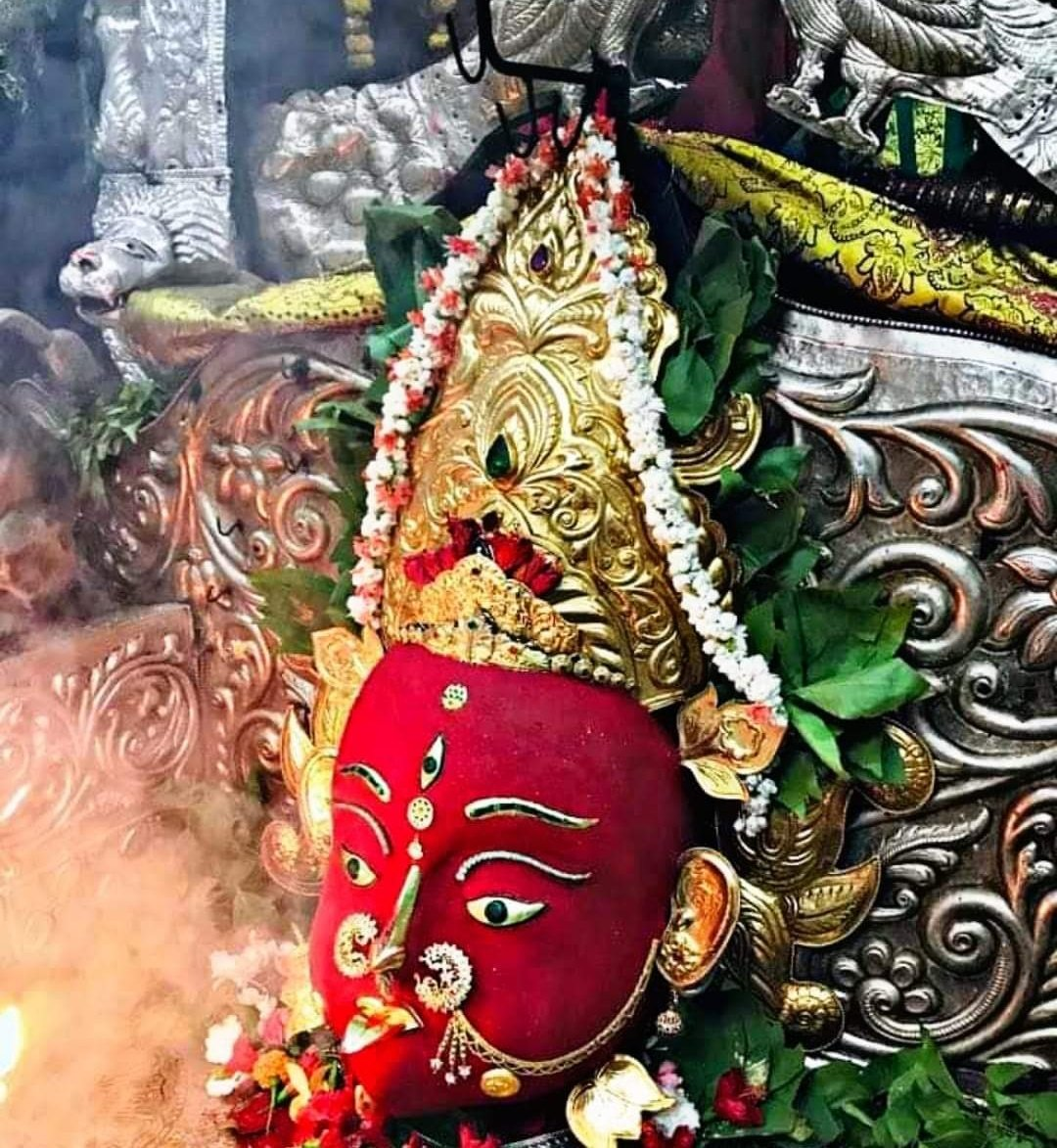
- Maa Majhighariani Temple

- Location in Odisha

Religion
- Affiliation: Hinduism
- District: Rayagada
- Deity: Maa Majhi Ghariani
- Festivals: Durga Puja and Chaitra Puja

Location
- Location: Rayagada town
- State: Odisha
- Country: India
- Interactive map of Maa Majhighariani Temple
- Coordinates: 19°9′36.121″N 83°24′28.044″E

Architecture
- Type: Kalinga Architecture
- Creator: Vishwanath Dev Gajapati

Specifications
- Temple: 7
- Elevation: 219 m (719 ft)

Website
- https://rayagada.nic.in/tourist-place/maa-majhighariani-temple/

Majhighariani Temple is a shrine to a goddess in the Rayagada township of Odisha. It was built by King Vishwanath Dev Gajapati of the Suryavansh dynasty of Nandapur - Jeypore kingdom. It is believed that he made Rayagada his capital and after the construction of the temple he went on to conquer a vast dominion and expanded his kingdom from parts of Bengal to Telangana in south.

Visitors come to the shrine, especially on Wednesdays and Fridays and for Dussehra in October and Chaitra parva in March–April. The nearest railhead is Rayagada.

== History ==
According to the Odisha District Gazetteer, the 16th century Suryavanshi king Vishwanath Dev Gajapati moved his capital to Rayagada from Nandapur and built a fort on the Nagavali river, now in ruins, in which he built a temple of the Majhighariani goddess. The fort was later destroyed by the British, who used the stones to build a bridge. The current temple was built in the late 20th century.
