= Vaddadi Subbarayudu =

Indian Telugu writer and translator (1854–1938)

Vaddadi Subbarayudu (1854–1938) was a popular Indian Telugu writer and translator. His writing had widespread appeal.

== Early life ==
Subbarayudu was born on 30 July 1860 to a poor Brahmin family in the East Godavari district of India. His father, Suraparaju, was a scholar, poet and teacher. He had no formal schooling but was taught by his relatives.

He began reciting poetry in 1868 at the age of 14.

== Career ==
He translated the bhajagovindam from Sanskrit. In 1874, he translated labdanasana tantra from Sanskrit and named it nyayadarpanam.

He taught Telugu at Innispet High School in Rajahmundry for 10 years. In 1888, he joined the Government School (later Government Arts College) as a Telugu lecturer.

In 1887, as part of Queen Victoria's Golden Jubilee celebrations, while India was still a British colony, Subbarayudu recited his work alongside other popular poets including Kandukuri Veeresalingam and Vavilala Vasudeva Sastry in Rajahmundry.

== Books ==
- Nandanandana Satakam (1878)
- Sumanognam (1879)
- Venisamharam (1893)
- Vikramorvaseeyam (1889)
- Prabodha Chandrodayam (1893)
- Chandakousikam (1900)
- Suktivasu Prakasika (1882)
- Bhaktachintamani Satakam.
- Meghasndesam (1884)
- Surya Satakam (1888)
- Vaijayanti Bhamini Vilasam (1894)
- Mallika Maruta Prakaranam (1903)
- Satismriti (1896)
- Abhijnyana Sakuntalam (1907)
- Sutasmriti(1907)
- Nrisimhasthavam (1900)
- Viswaroopasthavam (1915)
- Vasurayachatu Prabandham (1925)
- Andhra Kundamala
- Artha Rakshamani

== Honours ==
He was honored with "sukti sudhanidhi" and "kavisekhara" titles.
