= Seethampeta, Parvathipuram Manyam =

Seethampeta
- Village
- Interactive map of Seethampeta
- Location in Andhra Pradesh, India Seethampeta (India)
- Coordinates: 18°43′04″N 83°46′44″E
- Country: India
- State: Andhra Pradesh
- District: Parvathipuram Manyam
- Talukas: Seethampeta

Languages
  - Official: Telugu
- Time zone: UTC+5:30 (IST)
- PIN: 532443
- Vehicle registration: AP
- Lok Sabha constituency: Araku (ST)
- Assembly constituency: Palakonda (ST)

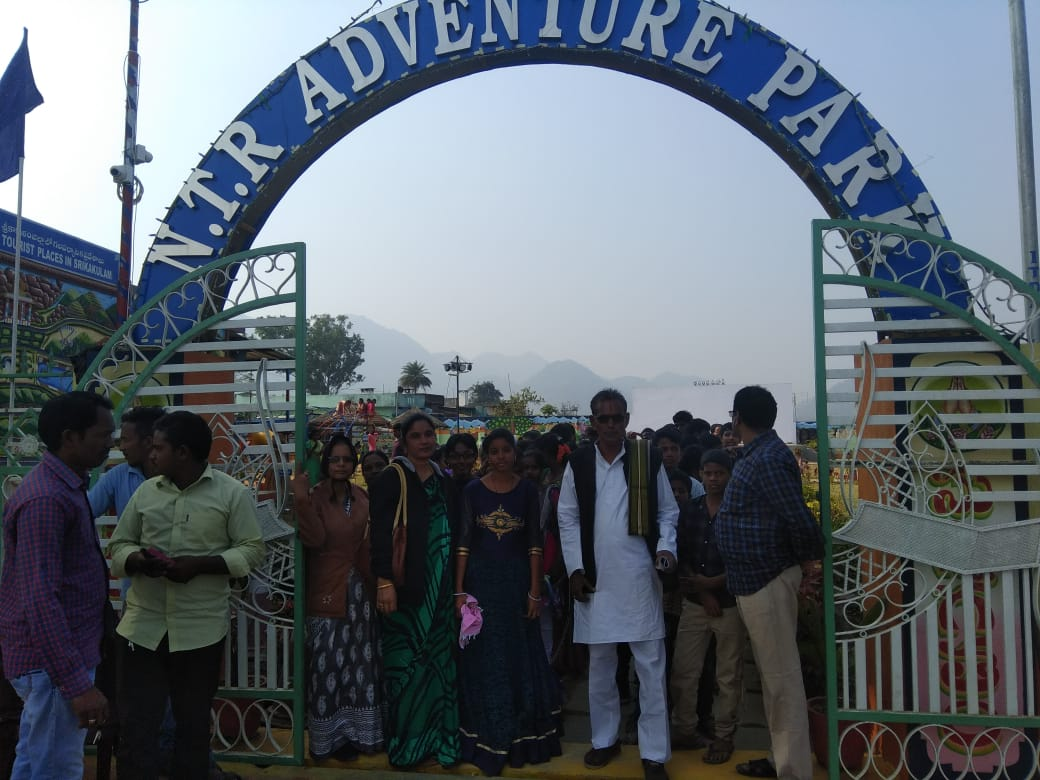
Entrance to the NTR Adventure Park, an attraction in Seethampeta

Seethampeta is a village in the Parvathipuram Manyam district of the Indian state of Andhra Pradesh. It is located in Seethampeta mandal in Palakonda revenue division.
