= Rampa Rebellion of 1922 =

Civil conflict in British India

- Part of Tribal revolts in India before independence
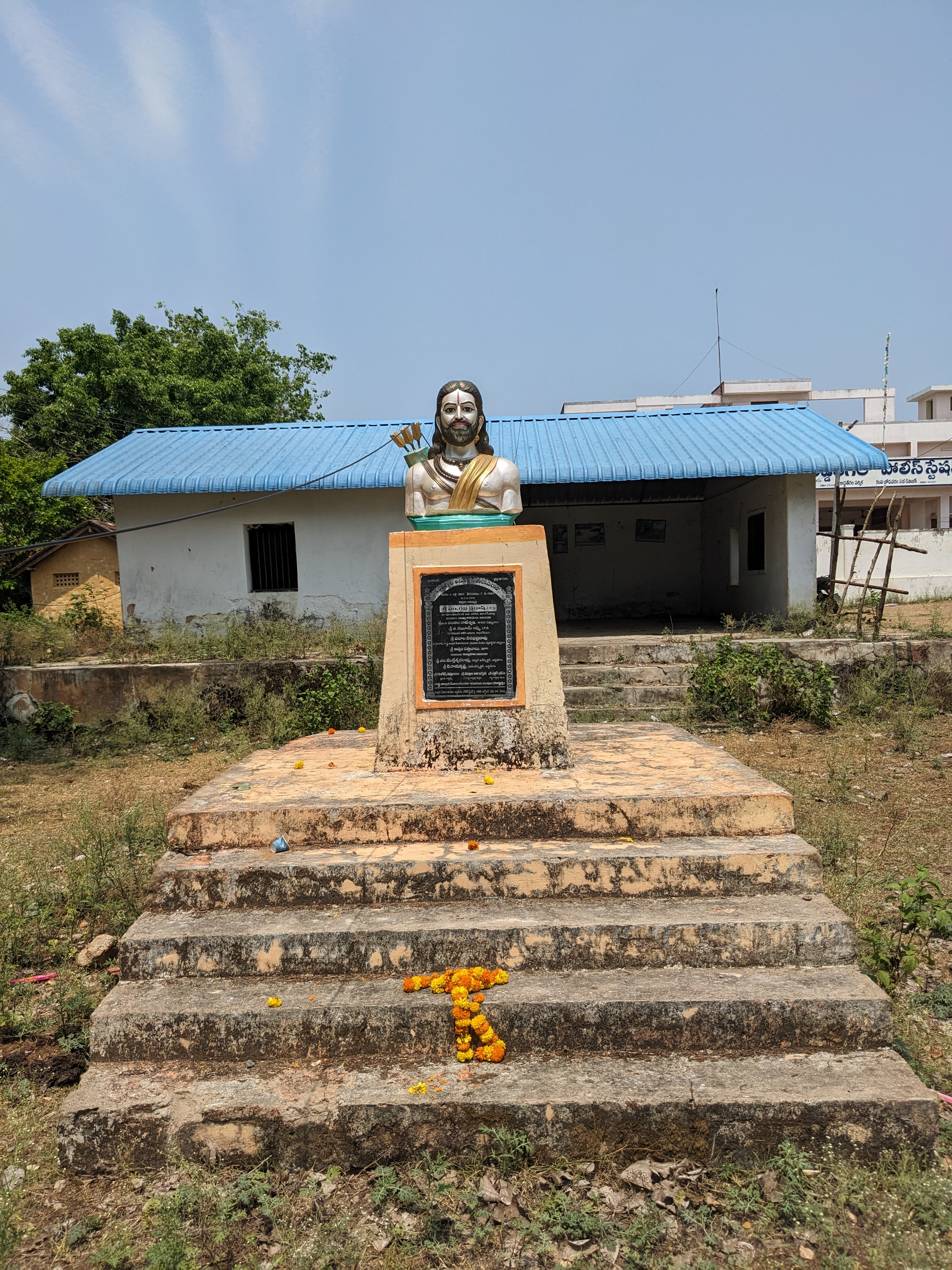
- Bust of Alluri Sitarama Raju at Addateegala Police station
- Locations: Rampa Agency Tract, Godavari district 17.4398°N 81.7752°E; Gudem Agency Tract, Vizagapatam district 17.8624°N 82.1978°E
- Commanded by: Alluri Sitarama Raju
- Date: 1922–1924
- Casualties: Unknown

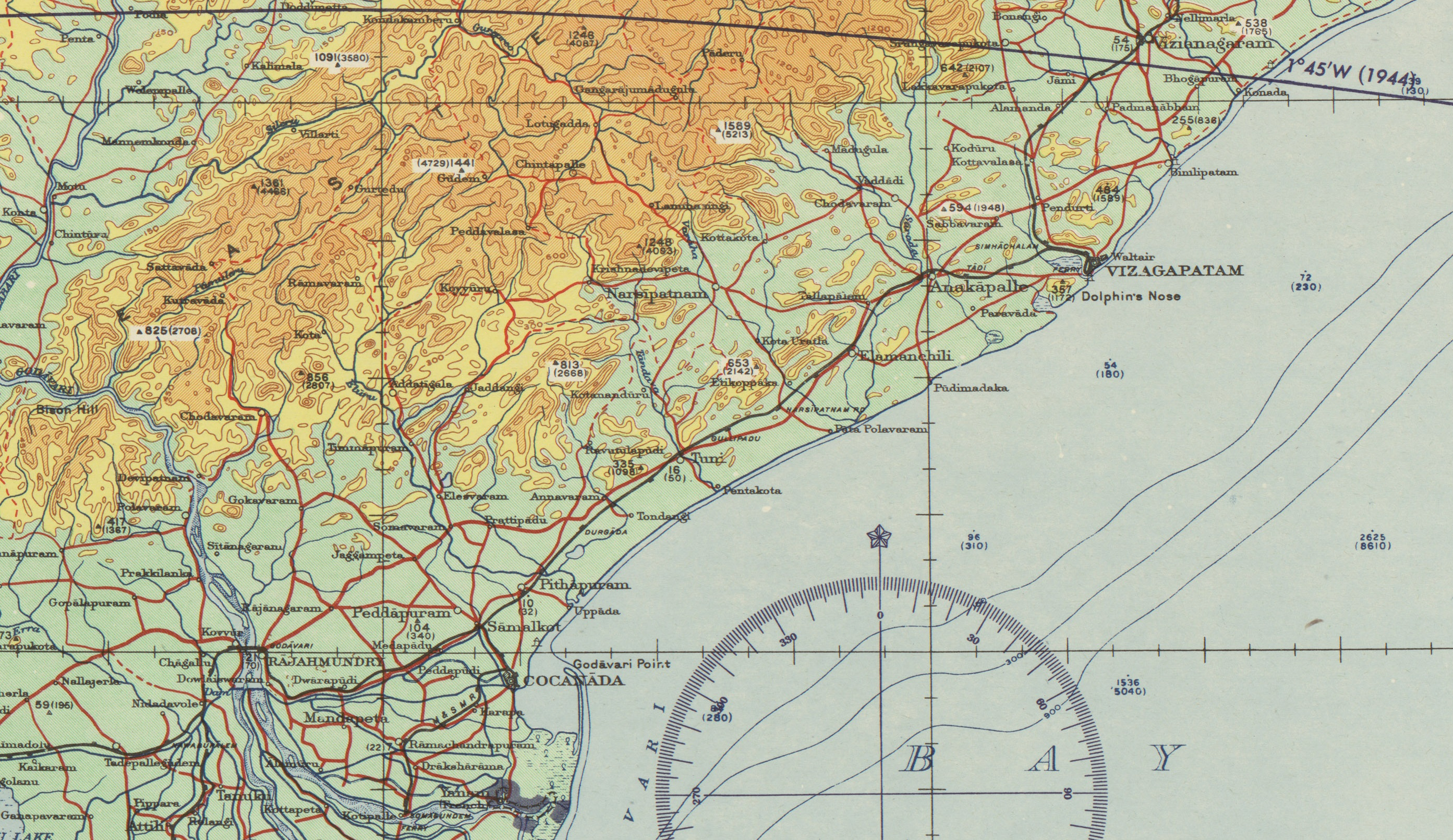
Agency tracts of Godavari and Vizagapatam districts (shaded brown); among the marked villages are Chodavaram (Rampa), Addatigala, Gudem, Koyyuru, Chintapalle, and Krishnadevipeta.

The Rampa Rebellion of 1922, also known as the Manyam Rebellion, was a tribal uprising led by Alluri Sitarama Raju in Godavari district of Madras Presidency, British India. It began in August 1922 and lasted until the capture and killing of Raju in May 1924.

== Background ==
The three northern districts of Godavari, Vizagapatam and Ganjam in the erstwhile Madras Presidency of British India (presently in northern Andhra Pradesh state and southern Odisha) consist of strips of coastal plains bordered in the west by Eastern Ghats (hills). The hills are thinly populated by tribal communities, whose ethnic and cultural traits, differing from the plains people, were regarded as "primitive" in the British view. The hill tracts were thus put outside the purview of the general law applicable to the districts and lightly administered by the District Collectors in their capacity as the "Agents to the Governor" or "Government Agents". The areas themselves were referred to as "Agencies" or "Agency tracts". In local parlance, the regions were referred to as the Manyam forest. Indian political traditions led the kingdoms to manage them via granting of autonomy rather than direct conquest, which was essentially continued by the British Raj. Officials called muttadars were appointed to manage groups of villages, who were responsible for maintaining peace as well as revenue collection.

The Rampa administrative area, situated in the hills of what are now the Alluri Sitarama Raju district of Andhra Pradesh, comprised around 700 square miles (1,800 km^{2}) and had a mostly tribal population of approximately 28,000. They traditionally met their food requirements through the use, in particular, of the podu system, whereby each year some areas of forest were burned to clear land for cultivation.

The British Raj authorities had wanted to improve the economic usefulness of lands in Godavari Agency, an area that was noted for the prevalence of malaria and blackwater fever. With the 1882 Madras Forest Act authorities took control of the forests, mostly for commercial purposes such as produce for building railways and ships, without any regard for the needs of the tribal people. The act restricted the free movement of Adivasis in their forest habitats and prevented them from practicing their traditional form of agriculture called podu. A 1923 government memorandum recorded one Agency Commissioner's opinion from June of the previous year that "the country had suffered from too severe restrictions on jungle clearance, that various restrictions had been overdone and much population and food grains lost for the sake of forests of doubtful value".

The tribal people of the forested hills, who now faced starvation, had long felt that the legal system favoured the zamindars (estate landowners) and merchants of the plains areas, which had also resulted in the earlier Rampa Rebellion of 1879. Now they objected also to the Raj laws and continued actions that hindered their economic position and meant they had to find alternate means of livelihood, such as working as coolies. In particular, they objected to attempts at that time to use them as forced labour in the construction of a road in the area.

Simultaneously, there was discontent among the muttadars, who had been hereditary tax collectors and de facto rulers in the hills prior to the arrival of the British. They had acted on behalf of the rajas, the traditional rulers who lived in the plains, and essentially had unlimited powers until the British subsumed them into the colonial administration, leaving them as bureaucrats with no substantive power and no automatic right of inherited position. Their economic status was now dictated entirely by British Raj policy, where previously they had enjoyed the flexibility to levy and to cream off tax income and to use the land of others as they saw fit. Where once the tribal hill people and muttadars would have been antagonists, they now shared a common foe.

== Revolt ==
Villages around Gudem Kotha Veedhi ("Gudem New Town") and Chintapalli

Raju was a charismatic sannyasi, believed by many tribal people to possess magical abilities and to have an almost messianic status. He saw the overthrow of colonial rule in terms similar to a millenarian event and he harnessed the discontent of the tribal people to support his anti-colonial zeal, whilst also accommodating the grievances of those muttadars who were sympathetic to his aim rather than merely narrow-minded in their pursuit of a revived status for themselves. This meant that his followers were mostly from the tribal communities but did include some significant people from the muttadar class that at one time had exploited them, although many muttadars were ambivalent about fighting for what Raju perceived to be the greater good.

It was the prevalent diseases, to which the tribal people had acquired a tolerance, that hindered the Raj suppression of the rebellion. It broke out in August 1922 and took the form of guerilla warfare, ending in May 1924 with the capture and execution of Raju.

== Bibliography ==
- Arnold, David (1982). "Rebellious Hillmen: the Gudem-Rampa Risings, 1839-1924". In Ranajit Guha (ed.). Subaltern Studies 1. Oxford University Press. pp. 88–142.
- Hemingway, F. R. (2000) [1915], Godavari District Gazetteer, Volume 1, Asian Educational Services – via archive.org
- Mukherjee, Mridula (2004). Peasants in India's Non-Violent Revolution: Practice and Theory. SAGE. ISBN 978-0-76199-686-6.
- Murali, Atlury (April 1984). "Alluri Sitarama Raju and the Manyam Rebellion of 1922-1924". Social Scientist. 12 (4): 3–33. doi:10.2307/3517081. JSTOR 3517081.
- Murali, Atlury (April 1985). "Manyam Rebellion: A Rejoinder". Social Scientist. 13 (4): 50–56. doi:10.2307/3517518. JSTOR 3517518.
- Murali, Atlury (2017). "Tribal Armed Rebellion of 1922-1924 in the Madras Presidency: A Study of Causation as Colonial Legitimation". In Crispin Bates; Alpa Shah (eds.). Savage Attack: Tribal Insurgency in India. Taylor & Francis. pp. 140–166. ISBN 978-1-35158-744-0.
