= Alluri Seetarama Raju (film) =

1974 film

- Poster
- Directed by: V. Ramachandra Rao
- Written by: Tripuraneni Maharadhi
- Produced by: G. Hanumantha Rao; Krishna (presenter)
- Starring: Krishna; Vijaya Nirmala; Jaggayya
- Cinematography: V. S. R. Swamy
- Music by: P. Adinarayana Rao
- Production company: Padmalaya Studios
- Release date: 1 May 1974
- Running time: 187 minutes
- Country: India
- Language: Telugu

Alluri Seetarama Raju is a 1974 Indian Telugu-language biographical action film directed by V. Ramachandra Rao and written by Tripuraneni Maharadhi. The film stars Krishna, Vijaya Nirmala, and Jaggayya and was produced by Padmalaya Studios. Notably, it was Krishna's 100th film as an actor and the first Telugu film to be entirely made in Cinemascope.

The film portrays the life of Alluri Sitarama Raju, a prominent Indian revolutionary who led the Rampa Rebellion against British colonial rule from 1922 until his capture and execution in 1924. The narrative highlights Raju’s leadership and the rebellion's impact against repressive British legislation.

Alluri Seetarama Raju received critical acclaim, winning the National Film Award for Best Lyrics for the song "Telugu Veera Levara," written by the Telugu poet Sri Sri. It also won the Nandi Award for Best Feature Film and was showcased at the International Film Festival of India and the Tashkent Film Festival. The film was an industry hit, running for 175 days, and became the first Telugu film to collect a distributor share of ₹1 crore.

== Plot ==
From a young age, Alluri Rama Raju demonstrates a fierce opposition to British colonial rule. Rejecting British-conducted education, he immerses himself in traditional Indian yogic practices and travels across the country. Witnessing the widespread oppression of the masses under foreign administration, he rejects nonviolence in favour of armed struggle.

Rama Raju is in love with Sita, and their families approve of their marriage. However, driven by his commitment to Indian independence movement, Rama Raju informs Sita of his choice to embrace celibacy and dedicate his life entirely to the freedom movement. Devastated by his decision, Sita dies. Mourning her loss, Rama Raju renames himself Sitarama Raju in her honour and foreswears personal life.

Sitarama Raju forms a close bond with local tribal leaders Gam Malludora and Gantam Dora, and mobilises the tribal population into a disciplined guerrilla force. Emboldened by Sitarama Raju's spiritual leadership and guidance, the tribals initiate Rampa Rebellion of 1922. Armed primarily with traditional weapons like bows and arrows alongside captured British rifles, Sitarama Raju leads raids on police stations. Before executing each raid, Sitarama Raju sends an advanced warning notes detailing the exact date and time of the attack, leaving the British officers humiliated as his forces repeatedly seize arms and ammunition without inflicting unnecessary harm on low-ranking constables.

Alarmed by the uprising, the British administration deploys specialised armed forces under the command of a ruthless officer named Rutherford. The British impose severe blockades, cut off essential supplies to the agency tracts, and unleash violent crackdowns on non-combatant tribal villages to force them into revealing Sitarama Raju's whereabouts. Devastated by the intense suffering inflicted upon innocent people and recognising the military imbalance, Sitarama Raju surrenders.

Although Rutherford and his subordinate officers are personally impressed by Sitarama Raju's integrity and principles, they carry out his execution. Proclaiming that his death will inspire thousands of future revolutionaries, Sitarama Raju is executed by firing squad, dying a martyr for the freedom struggle.

== Cast ==
- Krishna as Alluri Sitarama Raju
  - Ramesh Babu as Young Alluri Sitarama Raju
- Jaggayya as Rutherford Scott Coward
- Rajanala as Major Goodall
- Vijaya Nirmala as Seeta
- Chandra Mohan as Govindu
- Sreedhar as Tirupathayya
- M. Balayya as Aggi Raju
- Kanta Rao as Padalu
- Pandari Bai
- Mikkilineni as Seetha's father
- Dr. Prabhakar Reddy as Gam Malludora
- Rajababu
- Manjula
- Rajasree
- K. V. Chalam
- Gummadi as Gamgantam Dhora
- Tyagaraaju as Sebastian
- Ram Mohan as Venkatapathi, Sitarama Raju's brother-in-law
- Rao Gopal Rao
- Allu Ramalingiah

== Production ==
=== Development and casting ===
D. L. Narayana, producer of Devadasu (1953), initially sought to make a film based on Alluri Sitarama Raju featuring Sobhan Babu as the title character. However, as the film failed to take off, Narayana had given the story to Krishna who was willing to produce it thus becoming actor's 100th film as an actor. Incidentally it was Tripuraneni Maharadhi who wrote the script for producer D.L. Narayana too. N. T. Rama Rao also planned to make a film on it but dropped after he felt the subject was too dry and would not work commercially.

According to Maharadhi, the casting was done thorough discussions that involved everyone concerned with the project. S. V. Ranga Rao was originally for the role of Ghantam Dora but he got hospitalised before the film went to sets, he was replaced by M. Balayya.

=== Filming ===
Filming took place around Chintapalli forest and Krishnadevi Peta forest of Andhra Pradesh around 60 days with 15 days being shot in Madras. Ramachandra Rao died after completing one third of the film. The rest of the film was directed by Krishna; K. S. R. Das handled the war and fight scenes. The film's cinematographer V. S. R. Swamy who "managed the whole movie with just two lenses, one for closeups and another for long shots". Since this technique was absolutely untested before, the makers had to import the necessary equipment like Aeriflax and Michell cameras, 45 mm & 70 mm lenses from Kamal Amrohi who used them to can Pakeezah (1972).

== Soundtrack ==
Soundtrack was composed by P. Adinarayana Rao.

- "Viplavam Maraninchadu" – S. P. Balasubrahmanyam
- "Jamaira Jaru" – S. P. Balasubrahmanyam, L. R. Eswari
- "Vasthadu Naa Raju" – P. Suseela
- "Padmalayam" – S. P. Balasubrahmanyam
- "Telugu Veera" – Ghantasala, V. Ramakrishna

== Reception ==
=== Critical reception ===
The film received critical acclaim and became a cult classic of Telugu cinema. The film received a positive review from Andhra Patrika dated 5 May 1974.

=== Box office ===
The film ran for 200 days. It was the first film to collect a distributor share of ₹1 crore (equivalent to ₹30 crore or US$3.1 million in 2023).

== Awards ==
National Film Awards

- National Film Award for Best Lyrics – Sri Sri for "Telugu Veera Levara"

Nandi Awards

- Best Feature Film – Gold – G. Hanumantha Rao

== Legacy ==
The film was screened at the Patriotic Film Festival held at Coimbatore in 2017, jointly presented by the Indian Directorate of Film Festivals and Ministry of Defence, commemorating the 70th Indian Independence Day.

== See also ==
- RRR (2022), a fictional film depicting Alluri Sitarama Raju and his contemporary Komaram Bheem
