= Alluri Satyanarayana Raju =

Indian freedom fighter and politician

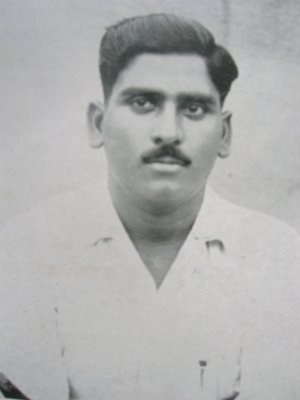

Personal details
- Born: 1913 Narasapuram
- Died: 1963 (aged 49–50) Hyderabad
- Citizenship: India
- Party: Indian National Congress
- Spouse: Annapoornamma
- Occupation: Freedom Fighter
- Nickname: Satyam

Alluri Satyanarayana Raju was a prominent figure in Indian history and the freedom struggle against British rule. Born in 1913 to Somaraju and Sooramma in the Alluri family of Narasapuram in the Valamarru village. He was also associated with significant endeavors in literature, education, rural development, and public works.

In Andhra, the name ‘Alluri’ reminds people of two heroes, Sri Alluri Sitarama Raju and Sri Alluri Satyanarayana Raju. Both were devoted patriots, and their patriotism was truly intense. Sri Alluri Sitarama Raju, who valiantly fought with the British and sacrificed his life in the revolt, is well known. Alluri Satyanarayana Raju, a distant relative of Sri Alluri Sitarama Raju, was also a heroic freedom fighter.

== Early life ==
During his childhood, Alluri Satyanarayana Raju used to cycle several kilometers to the market to sell lemons from his father's farm, crossing streams, and assisting farmers along the way.

Alluri Satyanarayana Raju participated in the freedom struggle from the age of 15 despite opposition from his father. Purushottam Master had a huge influence on the young schoolboy. He encouraged Raju to participate in the Swaraj movement. In 1929, Raju walked several kilometers to listen to Mahatma Gandhi when he visited Andhra.

== Marriage ==
At the age of 16, Raju married Annapoornamma from Mogallu village. Annapoornamma became a partner in the fight for independence.

== Days in Jail ==
From 1930 to 1946, Alluri Satyanarayana Raju spent several years in various prisons. He was imprisoned in the Cellular Jail on the Andaman Islands. During this time, he became friends with followers of Sri Alluri Sitarama Raju such as Padalu and Sanyasi Raju. With the help of his supporters and the intervention of British politicians, he was transferred back to Rajahmundry jail. In the Rajahmundry jail, he forged friendships with Vijayakumar Sinha and Shiva Varma, both proponents of Bhagat Singh's ideologies and participants in the Lahore conspiracy case.

Though Raju was released, he had to go to jail from time to time on various pretexts. He was arrested under the Salt Act in 1930. In 1931, he was detained for involvement in activities at Sitanagaram ashram. In 1932, he was held in connection with the Veera Bharati newspaper case (a secret newspaper distributed by Alluri Satyanarayana Raju that ignited a spark against British rule). His commitment to Satyagraha led to his detention in 1933, followed by his participation in the Kothapatnam summer camp in 1937. In 1938, he was arrested for his involvement in the Kalipatnam peasants' struggle.

Madduri Annapurnaiah was Alluri Satyanarayana Raju’s political mentor, philosopher, and guide. He served as the editor of patriotic magazines such as Congress, Navashakti, and Jai Bharat, which played significant roles in promoting nationalist ideals during the freedom movement. During Raju's periods of imprisonment, he provided support and assistance to his family. Under his support and guidance, Raju's wife, Annapoornamma, moved to Jinnuru, where she stayed alone with her children.

== Volga Se Ganga ==
Alluri Satyanarayana Raju spent his time in prison reading and writing, becoming proficient in Hindi and English. While in the Andaman jail, he wrote an article for a magazine named Azadi. He wrote articles for Navashakti magazine and other newspapers. His writing generated a source of additional income for his family.

In 1940, Raju was arrested during ‘Vyakthi Satyagraha,’ and he spent time in prison translating Rahul Sankrityayan's well-known book Volga Se Ganga from Hindi to Telugu. The narratives within the book follow the journey of Indo-Iranian communities as they migrated from the Eurasian steppes to areas near the Volga River, eventually spreading to the Indo-Gangetic plains of the Indian subcontinent. The book spans from 6000 BC to 1942, marking the commencement of the Quit India Movement by Mahatma Gandhi.

== Ideology ==
Alluri Satyanarayana Raju was a progressive individual who believed in embracing change and empowering women. He recognized the evolving societal norms and the importance of women's participation in education, employment, and social movements. Despite facing resistance from his mother, Sooramma, who held traditional views, Raju advocated for his wife's involvement in Swaraj meetings, emphasizing the need for everyone to contribute to societal progress. He challenged beliefs and encouraged his family to adapt to modern ideals of equality and empowerment.

Alluri Satyanarayana Raju embodied the principles of truth and insisted on clean politics throughout his life. He believed in absorbing the best practices of each ideology. He transitioned from a staunch believer in Congress to exploring revolutionary and Marxist ideologies, eventually aligning with Subhash Chandra Bose's political vision. Notably, he named his son after Subhash Chandra Bose. He was comfortable with both communism and the gentle, nonviolent Satyagraha of Congress. However, he opposed the sharpness of the left-wing sentiments adopted in the earlier independence movement and revolutionary activities. His greatness was in absorbing the virtues of all, bringing them into the mainstream. He was always concerned about the larger public interest.

Despite ideological shifts, Alluri Satyanarayana Raju remained respected across political lines for his integrity. His political tactics reflected his diverse thoughts. He shared a good relationship with the Communist leader, Puchalapalli Sundarayya. He respected Sundarayya's perspectives on the Indian freedom struggle and appreciated his views. This mutual respect and dialogue between individuals with differing ideologies demonstrate Raju's openness to diverse political thought and his commitment to the broader cause of independence for India. Even though Uddaraju Rama Raju was a member of the Communist Party, it did not deter their friendship.

== Political Life ==
Alluri Satyanarayana Raju was the inaugural legislator of Narasapuram. As the first MLA of the constituency, he devoted himself to public service. He never aspired to be in any position of power. He prioritized his service to the Congress party. He was a close confidant of Jawaharlal Nehru and later Indira Gandhi. When they served as Congress presidents, Alluri Satyanarayana Raju served as the national general secretary. As the Chairman of the Pradesh Congress Committee, he propagated socialist and land reformation ideals throughout the state.

Alluri Satyanarayana Raju maintained cordial relationships with several prominent leaders, including Dr. Rajendra Prasad, Dr. S. Radhakrishnan, Morarji Desai, and Govind Vallabh Pant. These relationships underscored his ability to collaborate and engage with leaders from diverse backgrounds, highlighting his influence and respect within the political landscape of his time.

Alluri Satyanarayana Raju played a pivotal role in shaping the political landscape of Andhra Pradesh, particularly in the appointment of key figures. He was instrumental in anointing ‘Andhra Kesari’ Tanguturi Prakasam Panthulu as the first Chief Minister of Andhra State. Additionally, he played a significant role in advocating for the formation of the state of Andhra Pradesh. Furthermore, Raju's influence extended to subsequent appointments of Chief Ministers. He was involved in the selection of Neelam Sanjiva Reddy and Damodaram Sanjeevaiah for the position of Chief Minister of Andhra Pradesh. This was a reflection of his strategic importance in state politics and his ability to navigate complex political scenarios for the benefit of the region. He worked as a PWD minister in Damodaram Sanjeevaiah’s cabinet.

== Positions held ==
1. A.I.C.C. Membership (from 1932)

2. Membership of Congress Socialist Party (from 1934)

3. West Godavari District Presidency (from 1937 to 1938)

4. Legislator (from 1946 to 1952)

5. District Congress President for the second time (1949)

6. A.I.C.C. as Secretary (from 1951 to 1952, from 1956 to 1958)

7. President of Andhra Pradesh Congress (from 1957 to 1958)

8. Member of Rajya Sabha (1951)

9. A.I.C.C. Secretary (from 1958)

10. Member of the State Cabinet (from 1960 to 1962)

He chronicled his experiences as a minister in an article titled Naa Mantri Padhavi, published in Andhra Prabha Sunday Magazine, dated November 11, 1961. He highlighted that although people sometimes perceive a ministerial position as a bed of roses, it was not so.

== Death and legacy ==
In 1963, Alluri Satyanarayana Raju succumbed to death due to health-related ailments.

Alluri Satyanarayana Raju prioritized the welfare of the common people over the aristocracy. At the time of independence, he fought for the cause of farmers against exploitative landlords. His commitment to socialist ideals and land reforms left a lasting impact on state policies, even though some of his goals were achieved posthumously. His dedication to rural development and public works initiatives made him a visionary leader committed to the upliftment of society. His collaboration with political opponents and disciples and his influence on public service positions reflect his ability to transcend ideological differences for the greater good.

The inauguration of the Alluri Satyanarayana Raju Z.P. High School at Jinnuru marked a significant milestone in the academic journey of students, signifying the enduring legacy of Alluri Satyanarayan Raju. Serving as a vital educational institution, the High School not only benefits the students of Jinnuru village but also serves as an educational hub for numerous remote villages in the surrounding areas. Villages such as Vedangi, Mattaparru, Poduru, Kavitam, Kommuchikkala, Oduru, Vallavanipalem, Jinnuru Palem, Vedangipalem, Chintaparru, Ullamparru, Penumadam, Gummuluru, Polamuru, and Achanta have access to education through this school. Over the years, the school has continued to flourish, providing quality education to students in the region.

In 1975, The Alluri Satyanarayana Raju Cultural Center was established in Narasapuram as a tribute to Alluri Satyanarayana Raju. This memorial building was dedicated to commemorating the life and contributions of Alluri Satyanarayana Raju, serving as a place to honor his memory and celebrate his achievements. Every year, a function is held to commemorate his contributions to the freedom struggle and his enduring impact on the nation.

Alluri Satyanarayana Raju's legacy continued through the contributions of his family members. His wife, Annapoornamma, served as a Member of the Legislative Council (MLC) for two terms after his demise. She played an important role in the development of Narasapuram until her death in 1977. The elder son, Alluri Subhash Chandra Bose, made significant strides in politics. He was elected as a Member of Parliament from the Narasapuram Constituency twice. He served as a Minister in Andhra Pradesh and held the position of Chairman of the National Shipping Board. Through his political endeavors, Subhash Chandra Bose continued his father's legacy of public service and leadership.
