= Alluri Sitarama Raju =

Indian freedom fighter and revolutionary

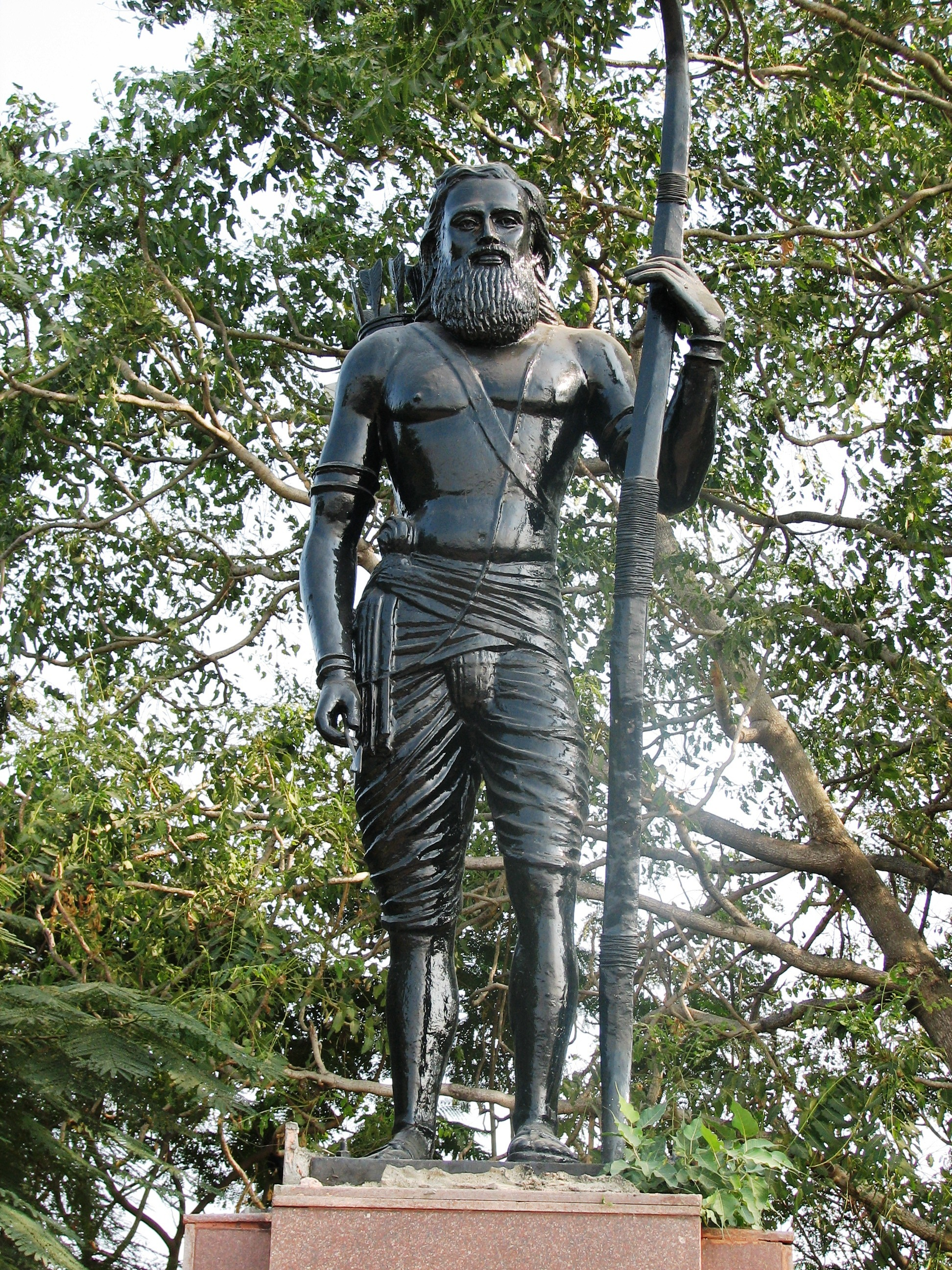
- Statue of Rama Raju in Hyderabad
- Born: 4 July 1897 or 1898; Pandrangi, Madras Presidency, British Raj (present-day Andhra Pradesh, India)
- Died: 7 May 1924 (aged 25 or 26); Koyyuru, Madras Presidency, British India (present-day Andhra Pradesh, India)
- Cause of death: Summary execution
- Resting place: Krishnadevipeta, Madras Presidency, British India (present-day Andhra Pradesh, India)
- Known for: Rampa Rebellion of 1922
- Title: Manyam Veerudu
- Parents: Alluri Venkata Rama Raju (father); Surya Narayanamma (mother)

Alluri Sitarama Raju (4 July 1897 or 1898 – 7 May 1924) was an Indian revolutionary who waged an armed rebellion against the British colonial rule in India. He engaged in guerilla campaigns against the British forces across the border regions of present-day Indian states of Andhra Pradesh and Odisha, and led the Rampa rebellion in 1922. He was known by the title "Manyam Veerudu" (hero of the jungle) to the local people.

Born into a Telugu family in Pandrangi in Madras Presidency (present day Andhra Pradesh) as Alluri Rama Raju, he prefixed the name "Sita" to his name in memory of a girl whom he loved during his youth and whose untimely demise at a young age left him heartbroken. He later took up sannyasa at the age of 18 and became a leader of the tribal people in the early 20th century colonial India. In the backdrop of the Non-cooperation movement (1909–22) across the country, the Rampa rebellion was born from rising discontent towards the British rule amongst the tribals. The Madras Forest Act exploited the economic value of the forests and restricted the free movement of the tribals in their forest habitats, prevented them from practicing their traditional form of agriculture called podu, and threatened their way of life. Rama Raju harnessed these grievances and mustered a combined force consisting of tribals and other sympathisers to the cause, and engaged in guerilla campaigns against the British across the border regions of present-day Indian states of Andhra Pradesh and Odisha. (Note: During the Rampa uprising that took place in 1922–24 by the Gond tribals under the leadership of Alluri Sita Rama Raju across Andhra-Orissa border, Raju used the 'constructive' programme of Gandhi as an effective camouflage to educate and prepare the masses for a showdown with the British and his camouflage was so effective that he caught both the Congress leadership and the British rulers by surprise in August 1922 by openly looting three police stations and declaring a liberation war.)

Rama Raju sought to expel the British forces from the Eastern Ghats region in the erstwhile Madras Presidency. During the rebellion he led numerous raids on police stations of the imperial police to acquire firearms for his forces, which resulted in significant police casualties. After each raid, he would leave a written note in the station signed by him informing the police about the details of his plunder there, including details of the weaponry he acquired daring them to stop him if they could. In response to these raids and to quell the rebellion, the British colonial authorities undertook a two year long manhunt and spent over ₹4 million (equivalent to ₹820 million or US$8.5 million in 2023) to capture Rama Raju. Eventually, in 1924, he was captured in Chintapalli forests, and was tied to a tree, and summarily executed by a firing squad at Koyyuru. A mausoleum housing his final remains was later built at Krishnadevipeta.

The Alluri Sitharama Raju district, and the Alluri Sitarama Raju International Airport in the Visakhapatnam Metropolitan Region are named after Rama Raju.

== Early life ==
=== Birth and childhood ===
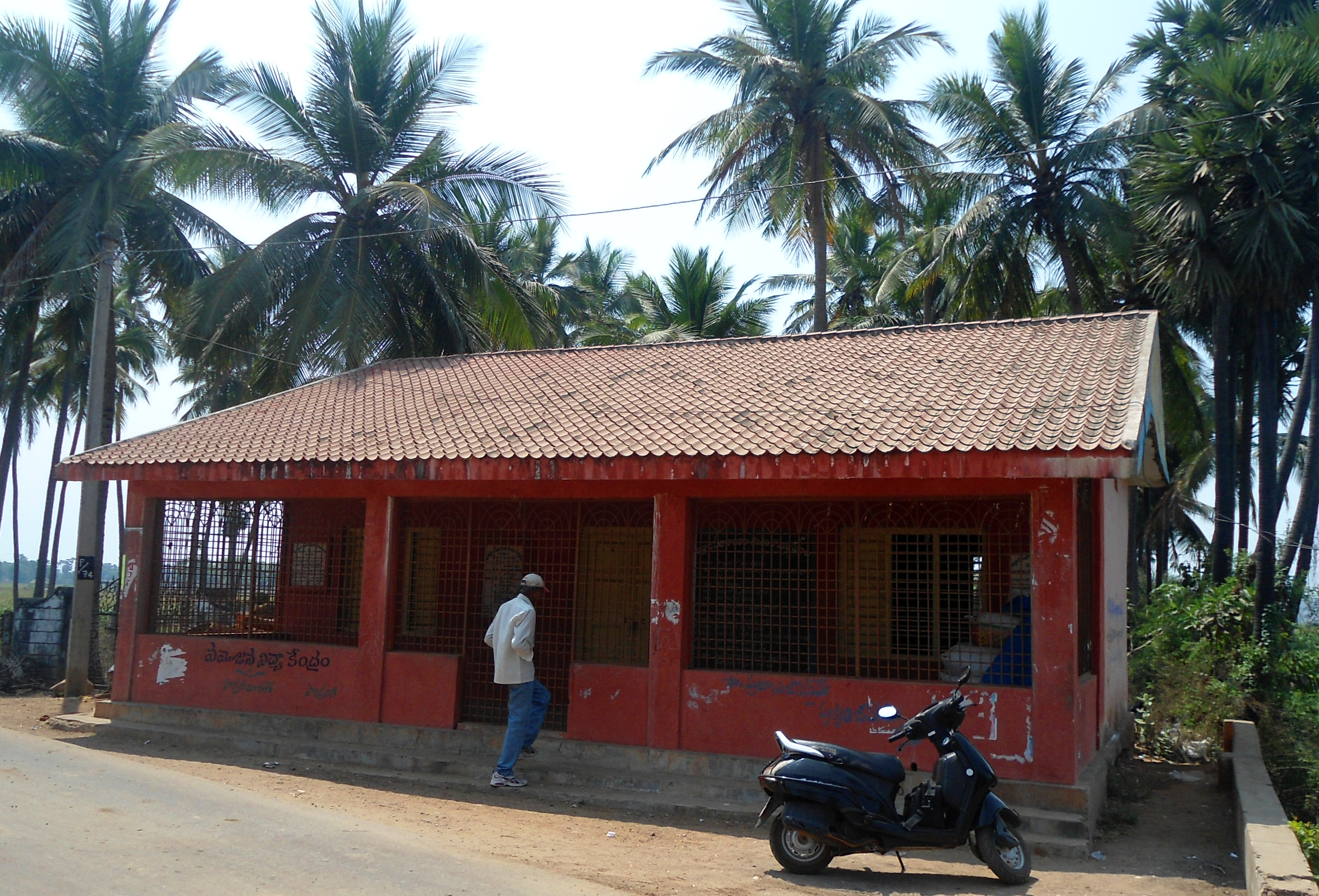
House in Pandrangi, believed to be the birthplace of Rama Raju

Alluri Rama Raju was born into a Telugu family in the erstwhile Madras Presidency (current Indian state of Andhra Pradesh). He was born on 4 July and his year of birth is reported by some sources as 1897 and others as 1898. Details of his place of birth also vary, with various sources suggesting it as Bhimavaram, Mogallu, or Pandrangi. His father, Alluri Venkata Rama Raju, was a professional photographer, who later settled in Rajahmundry, and his mother, Surya Narayanamma, was a housewife. His father was an advocate of self respect and freedom of Indians, and once chided a young Rama Raju for practicing the then prevalent custom of Indian people saluting the Europeans in acknowledgement of their superiority. Venkata Rama Raju died when his son was eight years old.

=== Education and youth ===
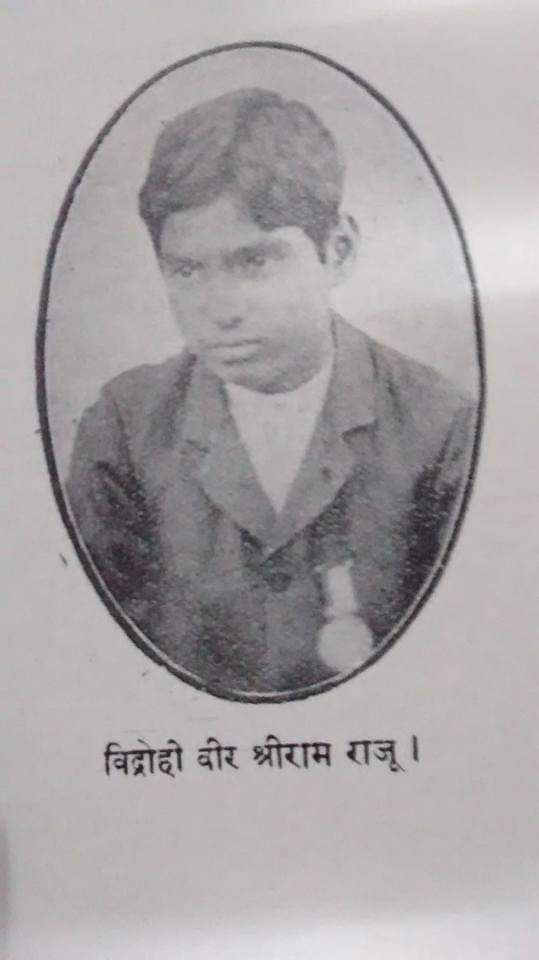
Rama Raju during his childhood

Rama Raju completed his primary education and joined high school in Kakinada. There he met Madduri Annapurnaiah (1899–1954), who later grew up to be another Indian revolutionary. In his teens, Rama Raju, in accordance with his reticent and meditative nature, contemplated taking sannyasa. At the age of 15, he moved to his mother's home town of Visakhapatnam to pursue further studies, and got enrolled at Mrs. A. V. N. College. During his time there, he visited remote hilly regions got familiarised himself with various problems faced by the adivasis under the British colonial rule.

Around this time, Rama Raju developed a love for his friend's sister named, Sita, whose untimely demise at a young age left him heartbroken. To commemorate her memory, Rama Raju prefixed her name to his and came to be known as Sita Rama Raju. He eventually dropped out of school, and at the insistence of his uncle, Rama Krishnam Raju, who was a tehsildar in Narsapur, and under whose tutelage Rama Raju grew up, he was admitted in the Taylor high school at Narsapur. However, he eventually gave up formal education and privately read literature in various languages such as Telugu, Sanskrit, Hindi, and English. As per contemporary reports, he took a particular interest in astrology, herbal medicine, palmistry, and equestrianism. He became a sannyasi (religious ascetic) at the age of 18.

=== Life as an ascetic ===
After becoming an ascetic, Rama Raju practiced various spiritual disciplines to gain moral stature and became an expert healer with herbs. In 1921, he undertook a pilgrimage to Gangotri and Nashik, birthplaces of the holy rivers Ganga and Godavari respectively. During his travel, he met various Indian revolutionaries in Chittagong. He then settled down in the Papi hills near Rajahmundry, dominated by tribal population. He lived an austere life amongst the tribal people, and took only food items such as fruits and honey from them, while returning others back to the tribals with his blessings. His charismatic nature gained him a reputation among the tribals of being someone possessed with holy powers, and a messianic status–a reputation that was bolstered both by myths he created about himself and by his acceptance of ones about him that were established by others, including those concerning his invincibility.

== Rampa rebellion (1922–1924) ==
=== Origins ===
The Madras Forest Act was passed in 1882, which exploited the economic value of the forests, and imposed restrictions on the free movement of tribal people. The tribes were made to pay dues for activities like grazing cattle, collecting fruit and fuel wood, and trading with the outsiders. They were also prevented them from engaging in their traditional "podu" agricultural system, a form of subsistence economy, which involved the system of shifting cultivation. The changes meant that they faced starvation, and threat to their livelihood, which forced them to engage in the demeaning, arduous, and exploitative coolie system being used by the government and its contractors for activities such as road construction.

The British authorities also emasculated the traditional hereditary role of the muttadars, who until then had been the de facto rulers in the hills as tax collectors for the local rules. Their roles were now reduced and though they were designated as civil servants, they had no overarching powers, no ability to levy taxes, and no right to inherit their position. Thus, the tribal people and the tax collectors, who once were in opposition to each other, were instead aligned in their disaffection with the colonial power.

=== Rama Raju's rise ===
Rama Raju pleaded with the colonial officials for concession, which earned no dividends. During this time, the efforts of Christian missionaries to gain convert the tribal people by any means annoyed him as he saw conversion as a tool to perpetuate imperialism. Concerned over the socio-economic conditions of the tribals, he felt that the only way out was through rebellion and decided to start a movement for their emancipation from the British rule. As the oppressive practices of the British continued, he became the natural leader of the rebellion. He harnessed the discontent of the tribal people to support his anti-colonial movement while also accommodating the grievances of some of the muttadars, who were sympathetic to his cause. While most of his followers were from the tribal communities, it also included some muttadars, although many of the muttadars remained ambivalent about fighting for what him.

Rama Raju noted the grievances of the tribals, and tried finding solutions to their problems. To attract people's support, he adopted aspects from the Non-cooperation movement such as promoting temperance, khadi, and boycott of colonial courts in favour of panchayat courts. Though the actual movement died out in early 1922, he used some of the methods used for the propagation of the movement, to raise awareness among the tribal people and fuel their desire for change. He started to organise them into a group and educate them about their rights. Around this time, the Koya tribal brothers, Gam Malludora and Gam Gantamdora joined the ranks of Rama Raju and became his lieutenants.

Rama Raju actively encouraged the tribals to equip themselves with weapons and be versed with the methods of guerrilla warfare. He prepared them for a fight against the officials, missionaries, and the police. Touring the region, he gained an extensive knowledge of the geographical features, which later helped him in his future as a guerrilla warfare tactician. While these actions brought him under police surveillance, his usage of propaganda as a camouflage to foment armed uprising had not been noticed by the political leadership of the British. The British government tried to sway him and offered him 60 acres of land for his ashram, but he rejected it and stood by the people. During a conversation with an official, while Rama Raju reportedly praised Mahatma Gandhi, he said violence was necessary and that he would continue his campaign till swaraj is established.

=== Attacks ===
Rama Raju built a fighting unit made up of his followers. Rama Raju, who wore khadi, provided khadi uniforms to his troops with the aid of Rallapalli Kasannla, a khadi producer from Tuni. Initially, the contingent used traditional weaponry like bow and arrow and spears, and employed tactics like using whistles and beating drums to exchange messages amongst themselves. While initially they had some success in their attacks against the British, Rama Raju soon realised that the traditional weaponry would not be of much use against the modern British forces equipped with firearms. So, he thought that the best way forward is to steal weaponry from the enemy and started planning attacks on the police stations. During the attacks, Rama Raju instructed his followers to not attack Indian combatants. His instructions were carefully followed, and when the combatants encountered when a combined force of Indians and the British, his followers had let go the Indians and attacked only the foreign troops.

Between 22 and 24 August 1922, Rama Raju led a troop of 500 people and plundered the police stations at Chintapalli, Krishnadevipeta, and Rajavommangi. The team gained possession of various weaponry including 26 muskets, 2,500 rounds of ammunition, six .303 Lee Enfield rifles, and a revolver. He subsequently toured the area to recruit more people for the cause and killed a police officer, who was part of a force sent to find him.

Before launching his raids, Rama Raju typically alerted colonial authorities by sending an arrow and a bunch of green chilies along with a warning message and the exact time and location of the assault, a tactic locally known as a "mirapakaya tapa" (chili post). After each of the raids, he usually left a written note detailing the plunder with a complete list of the weaponry he acquired. During his raids, he was supported by his assistant Aggi Raju. On 23 September 1922, Rama Raju and his contingent ambushed a police party from a high position on the hills of the Dammanapalli ghat, and killed two police officers. There were two further successful attacks against the police in the same month. Later, raids were carried out on the police stations at Annavaram, Addateegala, Narsipatnam, and Rampachodavaram.

=== Attempts of capture ===
Though the British mounted a pursuit of Rama Raju, they struggled because of the unfamiliar terrain, and the local people were unwilling to help them and instead favored Rama Raju, including providing him with shelter and intelligence. While the number of rebels dwindled to between 80 and 100 initially, the count rose when the British moved to take any action against the local people who supported him. To try and combat Rama Raju's style of guerrilla warfare, the British drafted in members from the Malabar Special Police, who were trained for such purposes.

Attempts to persuade local people to inform about or withdraw their support for Rama Raju through both incentives and reprisals did not succeed. At Dharakonda, once when Raju was engaged in the worship of goddess Kali, a team of special police launched an attack on him but failed in their objective. The incident further raised Raju's profile among the tribals who then started to see him as someone endowed with divine powers. As the rebellion continued unabated, detachments of the Assam Rifles were eventually brought in to quell it. To combat the rebellion and to capture Rama Raju, the district collectors of East Godavari and Visakhapatnam districts, who had jurisdiction over the areas of rebellion, employed all means possible, from burning villages to destroying crops, killing cattle, and violating women.

The situation was pretty serious, this must tell seriously on the prestige of the Government.

— Mr. Bracken, the District Collector of East Godavari on the actions of Alluri Sitarama Raju (18 October 1922)

A monetary reward of ₹10,000 (equivalent to ₹2.0 million or US$21,000 in 2023) was announced for the head of Rama Raju, and ₹1,000 (equivalent to ₹200,000 or US$2,100 in 2023) each for his lieutenants Gam Malludora and Gam Gantamdora. The fight continued for about two years capturing attention of the common people as well as the powerful officials across the country. In April 1924, the British government deputed Thomas George Rutherford, who resorted to employing extreme methods of violence and torture on the local people to know the whereabouts of Raju and his followers.

As Rama Raju was garnering support from the locals, the British cordoned off the hills and limited his influence in the regions of Peddavalasa, Gudem, and Darakonda. He tried to court people from the plains to his side, particularly people from the Indian National Congress. However, to his disappointment he found they had no sympathy for him and were against his actions on the ground that he violated the Gandhian principle of non violence. Historian David Arnold however noted that the real reason why the Congress leadership did not support Rama Raju and the tribals was because the Congress leaders "themselves shared the same class interest of the zamindars and moneylenders" against whom Raju and his people were revolting. Reactions from other political entities was either unresponsive or negative.

== Death and legacy ==
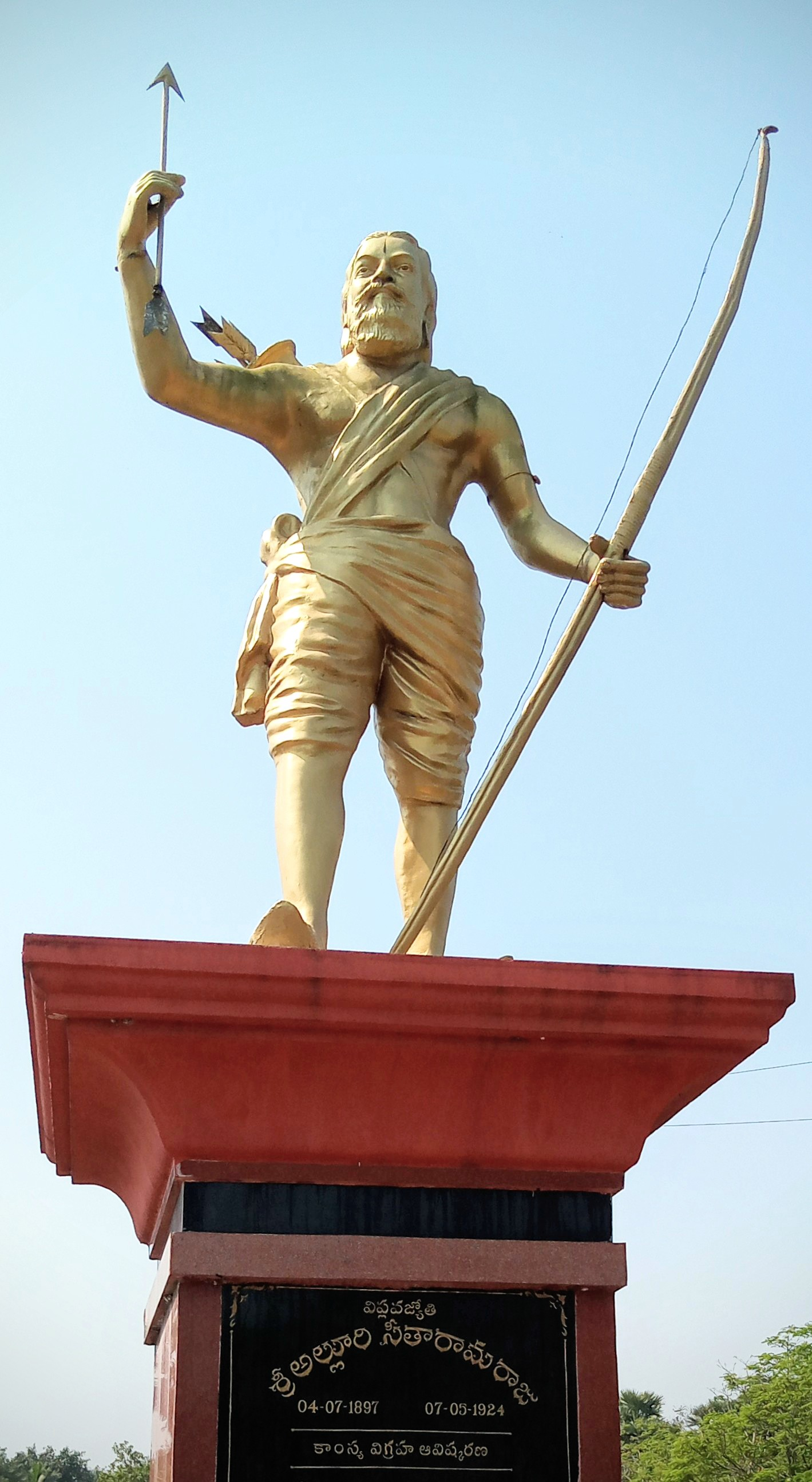
Rama Raju statue in Visakhapatnam

After a massive manhunt to capture Rama Raju for nearly two years, the British eventually captured him in the forests of Chintapalli. He was tied to a tree and was summarily executed by shooting on 7 May 1924 in Koyyuru. His mausoleum housing his final remains lies in Krishnadevipeta near Visakhapatnam.

Raju's lieutenant, Ghantamdora, was killed on 6 June 1924, and his brother Malludora was caught and imprisoned, who later after Indian independence became an elected member of the Lok Sabha in 1952 from Visakhapatnam constituency.

Raju had waged a prolonged armed conflict against the British government, which acknowledged him as a strong tactician of the guerrilla warfare and spent over ₹4 million (equivalent to ₹850 million or US$8.8 million in 2023) to capture him.

In 1929, during a tour of the Andhra region, Mahatma Gandhi was presented a portrait of Rama Raju. Responding to it on a later date, Gandhi wrote:

"Though I have no sympathy with and cannot admire armed rebellion, I cannot withhold my homage from a youth so brave, so sacrificing, so simple and so noble in character as young Shri Rama Raju . . . Raju was (if he is really dead) not a fituri but a great hero. Would that the youth of the country cultivated Shri Rama Raju’s daring, courage, devotion and resourcefulness and dedicated them for the attainment of swaraj through strictly non-violent means. To me it is daily growing clearer that if the teeming millions whom we the articulate middle classes have hitherto suppressed for our selfish purpose are to be raised and roused, there is no other way save through non-violence and truth. A nation numbering millions needs no other means." — Mahatma Gandhi

Jawaharlal Nehru commented that, "Rama Raju was one of those few heroes that could be counted on fingers." Subhas Chandra Bose noted that Rama Raju was fierce in his determination, and his unparalleled courage and sacrifice for people will ensure him a place in history. Historian David Arnold in his book The Rebellious Hillmen: The Gudem-Rampa rising 1839–1924, noted that because of his name, the tribals used to evoke the image of the Hindu deity "Rama" in Rama Raju, an honorary which despite being a religious man he never asked for.

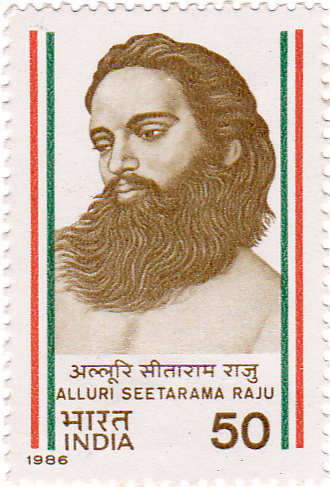
A commemorative stamp of Rama Raju released by India Post in 1986

In 1986, the Indian government released a commemorative stamp featuring him in the series 'India's struggle for freedom'. His birthday, 4 July, is celebrated as a state festival annually in Andhra Pradesh. The Alluri Sitarama Raju Cricket Stadium in Eluru is named after him. The Government of Andhra Pradesh has built several memorials at places associated with his life, and granted a political pension to his surviving brother. On 9 October 2017, the Government of India approved the installation of a statue of Rama Raju at the precincts of the Indian Parliament in recognition of his work.

In 2022, the Government of Andhra Pradesh carved out the Alluri Sitharama Raju district from the erstwhile Visakhapatnam district, with Paderu as its headquarters. In 2024, Alluri Sitarama Raju International Airport in Bhogapuram was named after Rama Raju.

=== In popular culture ===
- In the 1974 Telugu movie Alluri Seetarama Raju, actor Krishna plays the role of Rama Raju.
- The seventh episode of the Hindi series Swarajnama, directed by Girish Karnad, features a brief of Rama Raju.
- RRR (2022), a Telugu film directed by S. S. Rajamouli, featured a fictional story based on the lives of Rama Raju and Komaram Bheem, with Ram Charan portraying the character based on Rama Raju.
- In 2023, the 61st episode of the television series Swaraj focused on Rama Raju. The title role of Raju was played by Shresth Kumar and the series aired on DD National and Prime Video.
- The 2024 Telugu movie Manyam Dheerudu is based on his life.
