= Lothugedda junction =

Coordinates: 17°52′N 82°21′E

- Village
- Interactive map of Lothugedda junction
- Country: India
- State: Andhra Pradesh
- District: Alluri Sitharama Raju district
- Mandal: Chintapalle
- ISO 3166 code: IN-AP

Lothugedda junction is a village in Chintapalle mandal, Alluri Sitharama Raju district, in the Indian state of Andhra Pradesh.
