= Vanjangi =

Hill Station in Andhra Pradesh, India

- Hill Station
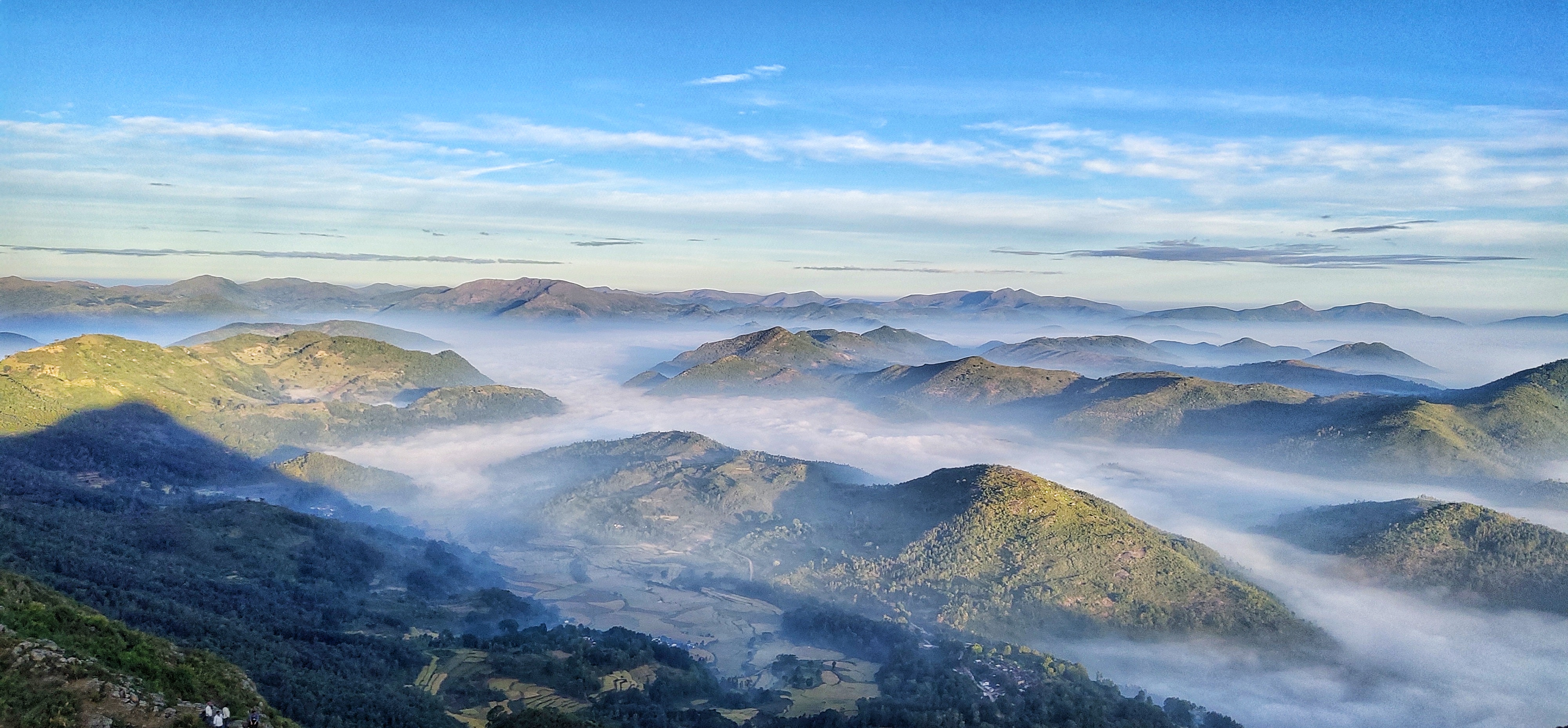
- View of Eastern Ghats from Vanjangi hilltop
- Interactive map of Vanjangi
- Location in Andhra Pradesh, India
- Coordinates: 18°02′48″N 82°38′57″E
- Country: India
- State: Andhra Pradesh
- District: Alluri Sitharama Raju

Government
  - MLA: Kottagulli Bhagya Lakshmi

Languages
  - Official: Telugu
- Time zone: UTC+5:30 (IST)
- PIN: 531 077
- Vehicle Registration: AP31 (Former); AP39 (from 30 January 2019)

Vanjangi is a hill station located near Paderu in the Alluri Sitharama Raju district of Andhra Pradesh, India. It is situated approximately 3,400 feet (1,000 m) above sea level.

== Geography and climate ==
Vanjangi is situated in the Eastern Ghats. The climate of Vanjangi remains cool throughout the year, and the area experiences heavy rainfall during the monsoon season.

== Tourist attractions ==
Vanjangi is known for its sunrises, with visitors often starting their trek early in the morning to see the view. The hill station experiences thick fog during the winter months, drawing many tourists. Winter arrives early in Vanjangi, with temperatures dropping to around 16 degrees Celsius. December to January is a popular time for tourists due to the fog and clear views.

The culture of Vanjangi is closely linked to the traditions of the indigenous tribal communities of the Eastern Ghats. Local customs include festivals, dances, and handicrafts that reflect the tribes' connection with their environment. The local markets and gatherings feature traditional attire, music, and dance.

== Transport ==
Vanjangi is accessible by several modes of transport despite its remote location. The primary way to reach Vanjangi is by road from Paderu. The Andhra Pradesh State Road Transport Corporation (APSRTC) operates buses from nearby towns to Paderu.

There is no railway station in Vanjangi itself. The nearest major railway station is in Visakhapatnam, approximately 125 kilometres (78 mi) away.
