= Paderu revenue division =

Coordinates: 17.68°N 83.01°E

- revenue division in Alluri Sitarama Raju district
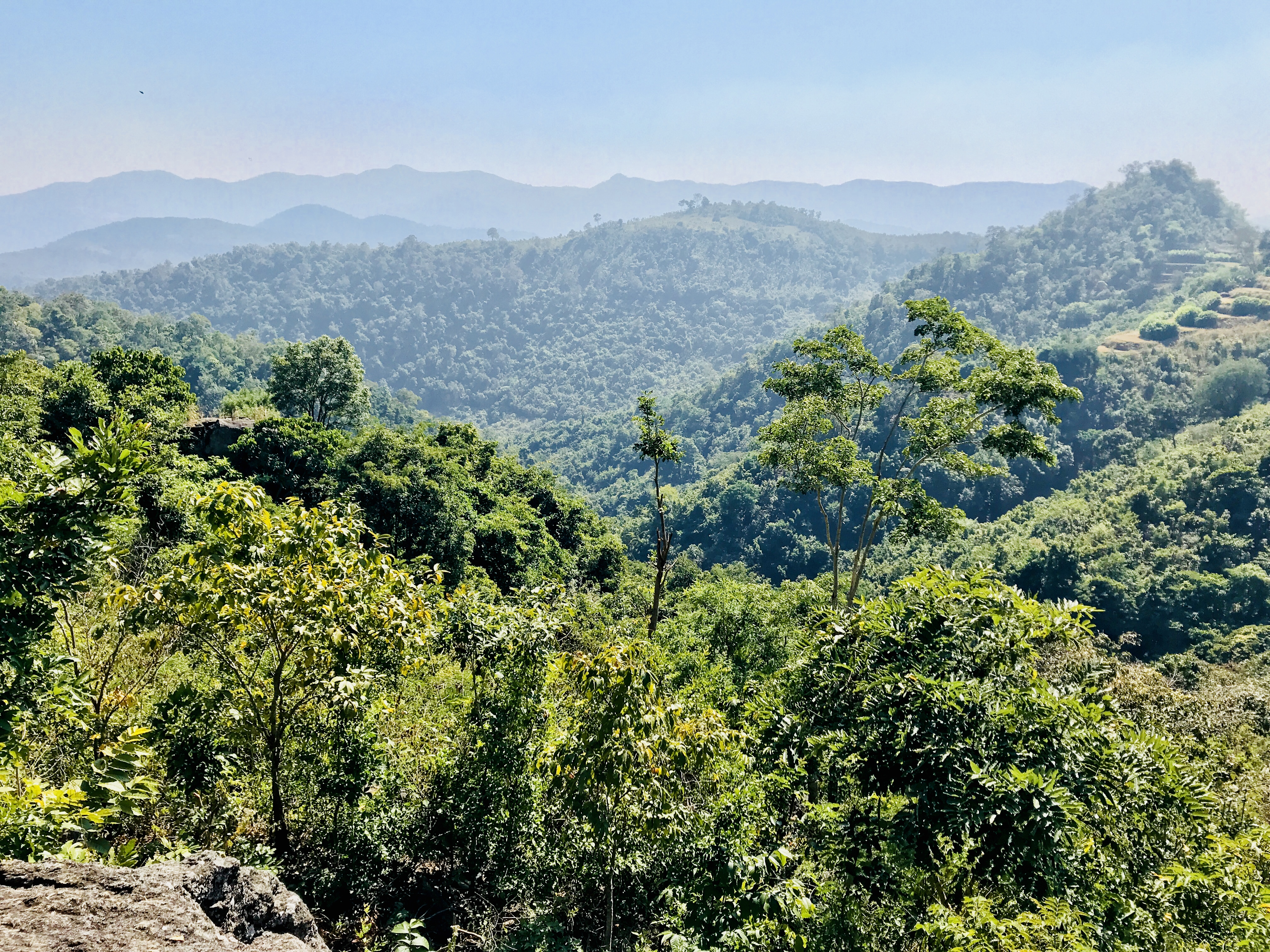
- Ananthagiri hills

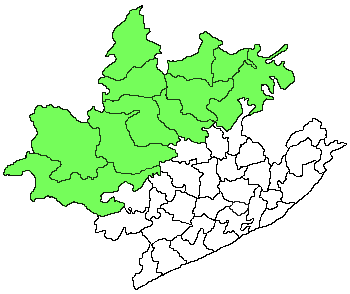
- Paderu revenue division
- Country: India
- State: Andhra Pradesh
- District: Alluri Sitarama Raju

Population (2011)
  - Total: 604,047
  - Rural: 576,026

Paderu revenue division (or Paderu division) is an revenue division in the Alluri Sitharama Raju district in the Indian state of Andhra Pradesh. It is one and only revenue divisions in the district which consists of eleven mandals under its administration. Paderu is the divisional headquarters.

Paderu division is situated in the Eastern Ghats and is tribal-dominated.

== Administration ==
There are 11 mandals under the administration of Paderu revenue division. They are:

No	Mandal
1	Araku valley mandal
2	Pedabayalu mandal
3	Dumbriguda mandal
4	Munchingiputtu mandal
5	Hukumpeta mandal
6	Ananthagiri mandal
7	Paderu mandal
8	G. Madugula mandal
9	Chinthapalli mandal
10	Gudem Kotha Veedhi mandal
11	Koyyuru mandal

== Demographics ==
It has a population of 6,04,047. 576,026 is rural and 28,021 is urban. Scheduled Castes and Scheduled Tribes make up 4,154 and 547,951 which is 0.69% and 90.71% of the population respectively.

97.35% of the population is Hindu while 1.50% of the population is Christian and 0.64% is Muslim.

At the time of the 2011 census, 66.54% of the population spoke Telugu, 17.39% Odia, 11.12% Kuvi and 3.19% Konda as their first language.

== See also ==
- List of revenue divisions in Andhra Pradesh
- List of mandals in Andhra Pradesh
