= Malabar Special Police =

Armed Police Unit

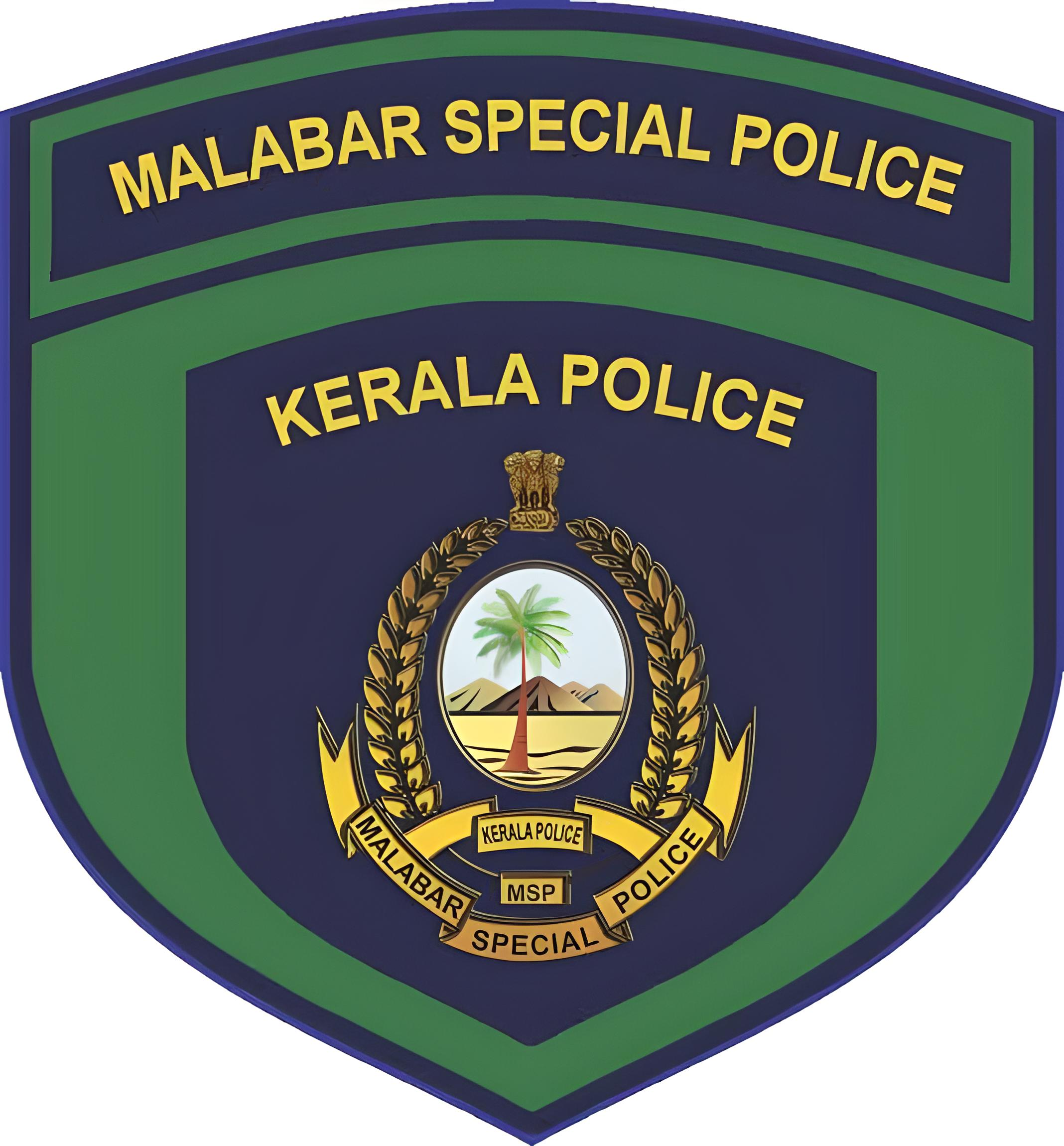
- Malabar Special Police unit logo
- Active: 1884–present
- Country: India
- Agency: Kerala Police
- Type: Auxiliary police Armed reserve police
- Role: Riot control; Disaster relief; Crowd control
- Part of: Kerala Armed Police HQ
- Headquarters: Malappuram
- Motto: “YUDHIVIKRAMA”
- Abbreviation: MSP

Structure
- Sworn officers: 1300
- Subunits: 1st Company; 2nd Company; 3rd Company; 4th Company; 5th Company; 6th Company; 7th Company

Notables
- Significant operation(s): Annexation of Hyderabad

Website
- https://keralapolice.gov.in/page/malabar-special-police

The Malabar Special Police (MSP) is an armed police battalion of the State Police of Kerala, India. MSP is headquartered in Malappuram, Kerala. The unit also trains new recruits and also helps the local police to maintain law and order during emergencies. During emergencies, this unit forms the riot police platoons fully equipped with riot gear. This police unit is known for its extraordinarily tough training, and the high quality of its firing and military drills. The MSP, initially known as Malappuram Special Police, originated in 1884 as a paramilitary unit tasked with managing the Malabar rebellion under British rule. Richard Hitchcock, the district superintendent of police for South Malabar at that time, advocated for the creation of this battalion, modeled after an Indian Infantry battalion.

== History ==
According to Kerala Police history, the unit dates back to the late 18th century when the local rulers of Kerala established armed paramilitary units to deal with the Moplahs. This function was later taken over by a group of 500 armed police officers, who were made responsible for collecting revenue from the Moplahs. The MSP was raised in 1884 as a temporary force under the name of Malappuram Special Police, since its headquarters were located in Malappuram, with a strength which consisted of 80 constables, 4 native head constables, 4 sergeants, a bugler and a British inspector. They were temporarily drafted into a special force and successfully suppressed a group of Mapilla villagers in Chembrassery. The squad was later made a permanent component of the police force in 1897.

In the 1921 Moplah Revolt, Malabar (the present districts of Kannur, Wayanad, Kozhikode, Malappuram, Palakkad and parts of Thrissur) witnessed a wave of popular unrest and other law and order problems. After MSP officers armed with Martini Henry single shot rifles failed to control the rebellion, Richard Hitchcock, the then District Superintendent of Police of South Malabar came up with the idea of raising a police unit armed and equipped similar British Indian infantry battalion to deal with the revolt. This suggestion, strongly endorsed by the District Magistrate, was accepted by the Viceroy's government on 30 September 1921, which then sanctioned the creation of 6 companies consisting of 6 British officers, 8 subedars, 16 jemadars, 60 havildars and 600 constables. The recruits were trained in Kannur and by an Indian Civil Service Officer, a Probationary Assistant Superintendent of Police and demobilized officers from the army. The force effectively suppressed the rebellion and gained fame due to its use of guerrilla tactics against the rebels.

In the following year, members of the force were drafted into Madras Presidency to counter the rebellion in the Rampa area that was being led by Alluri Sitarama Raju. Local forces had been unable to match the guerilla tactics of Raju in the forested areas, for which the Malabar unit were considered to be specialists.

In 1932, the force went through reorganisation and had its strength reduced to 6 companies. This number increased to 16 during the World War II. The MSP strike of 1946 brought this number down to 12 companies. The MSP also responded to the Madras police pay strike where it took control of the all police stations in the city after disarming the city policemen.

The battalion was later asked to join the Indian Army during annexation of Hyderabad to the Indian Union in 1948 becoming the first police force in the history of the country to be included in a military operation.

On the eve of the linguistic reorganisation of States 1956, the MSP was divided into two. Six companies and half of the Headquarters remained with Kerala while the other six companies and the rest of the headquarters allotted to Madras. Three more companies were raised in 1957.

Historically, various state governments, as well as the Government of India, have engaged the services of the MSP in response to situations of unruly law and order. Post-independence, MSP has demonstrated commendable efficacy in some of the nation's most challenging terrains. Noteworthy collaborations include deployments alongside Assam Rifles and Bihar Military Police to address insurgency issues in Nagaland.

== Structure ==
The MSP is led by a Commandant, the battalion comprises companies and platoons, each under the command of officers including Deputy Commandants and Assistant Commandants. Within these units, there's a chain of command ranging from Armed Police Inspectors to Constables. The Commandant of MSP is holding the rank of Superintendent of Police (SP). The commandant reports to Deputy inspector general of police, armed police battalions.

=== Hierarchy ===
- Commandant (Cmdt)
- Deputy commandant (DC)
- Assistant commandant (AC)
- Armed Police Inspector (API)
- Armed Police Sub Inspector (APSI)
- Armed Police Asst. Sub inspector (APASI)
- Havildar (Hdr.)
- Police constable (PC)
