= Araku =

Araku is a village in Dumbriguda mandal, Alluri Sitharama Raju district, Andhra Pradesh, India. It is famous for the nearby hill station Araku Valley.
