= Manyam Dheerudu =

Indian film

- Theatrical release poster
- Directed by: Naresh Dekkala
- Produced by: RVV Satyanarayana
- Starring: RVV Satyanarayana; R Parvathi Devi; R Pavan Ram Kumar
- Cinematography: Vineeth Arya K
- Edited by: Shyam Kumar .P
- Music by: Pavan Kumar Chippada
- Production company: RVV Movies
- Distributed by: SKML Motion Pictures
- Release date: 20 September 2024
- Country: India
- Language: Telugu

Manyam Dheerudu is a 2024 Indian Telugu-language film directed by Naresh Dekkala. The film stars RVV Satyanarayana and R Parvathi Devi in lead roles along with R Pavan Ram Kumar and Jabardast Appa Rao.

== Cast ==
- RVV Satyanarayana as Alluri Sitarama Raju
- R Parvathi Devi as Bharath Matha
- R Pavan Ram Kumar
- Jabardast Appa Rao
- Peela Sattipandu
- Korukonda Ranga Rao
- Umed Kumar Chouhan as Ruthar Ford
- Sandeep Singh Chauhan
- Srinivas Ulisetti
- Yerra Venkata Krishna Rao as Mallu Dora
- G.V. Trinadh as Gantam Dora

== Production ==
The film was produced by RVV Satyanarayana under the banner of RVV Movies. The cinematography was done by Vineeth Arya K while editing was handled by Shyam Kumar.The music was composed by Pavan Kumar Chippada.

== Soundtrack ==
The music was composed by Pavan Kumar Chippada

S. No	Song title	Singer(s)	Length	Ref.
1	"Namosthuthe Namosthuthe Bharatha Matha"	R V V Satyanarayana	4:51	

== Reception ==
Suhas Sistu of The Hans India rated three out of five and stated "'ManyamDheerudu' is a well-crafted tribute to a revolutionary hero. Its powerful message and gripping narrative make it a must-watch for those who enjoy historical dramas."
