= Gudem Kotha Veedhi =

- Village
- Interactive map of Gudem Kotha Veedhi
- Location in Andhra Pradesh, India Gudem Kotha Veedhi (India)
- Coordinates: 17.8624°N 82.1978°E
- Country: India
- State: Andhra Pradesh
- District: Alluri Sitharama Raju
- Elevation: 849 m (2,785 ft)

Population (2011)
  - Total: 1,845

Languages
  - Official: Telugu
- Time zone: UTC+5:30 (IST)
- Vehicle Registration: AP31 (Former); AP39 (from 30 January 2019)

Gudem Kotha Veedhi is a village and capital of Gudem Kotha Veedhi Mandal in Alluri Sitharama Raju district in the state of Andhra Pradesh in India.

== Geography ==
Gudem is located at 17.8667°N 82.2000°E. It has an average elevation of 849 metres (2788 ft).
