= Madras Forest Act, 1882 =

The Madras Forest Act, 1882 (Act V of 1882), enacted by British colonial government, closed off large areas of the forest in the Gudem Hills of Madras Presidency (present-day Andhra Pradesh). This restricted the free movement of the Adivasis in their forest habitats, prevented them from grazing their cattle, collecting firewood and food, and practicing their traditional form of agriculture called podu. The act is also known as the Tamil Nadu Forest Act, 1882, post-bifurcation of Madras state and its renaming.

== Background ==
The Rampa administrative area, situated in the hills of what are now the Godavari districts of Andhra Pradesh, comprised around 700 square miles (1,800 km^{2}) and had a mostly tribal population of approximately 28,000. They had traditionally been able to support their food requirements through the use, in particular, of the podu system, whereby each year some areas of jungle forest were burned to clear land for cultivation.

The British Raj authorities had wanted to improve the economic usefulness of lands in Godavari Agency. The traditional cultivation methods were greatly hindered when the authorities took control of the forests, mostly for commercial purposes such as produce for building railways and ships, without any regard for the needs of the tribal people. The tribal people of the forested hills, unable to farm, graze their cattle, or collect food, faced starvation, and were used as forced labour in the construction of a road in the area.

== The act ==
The act "extend[ed] to the whole of the State of Tamil Nadu" It prohibited the podu agricultural system: "And no fresh clearings for cultivation or for any other purpose shall be made on such land. No patta shall, without the previous sanction of the Board of Revenue, be granted on behalf of Government in such land, and every patta granted without such sanction shall be null and void."

The act prohibited "set[ting] fire to a reserved forest, or kindl[ing], or leav[ing] burning, any fire in such manner as to endanger the same; or... kindl[ing], keep[ing] or carr[ying] any fire except at such season and in such manner as the District Forest Officer may from time to time notify" as well as "fell[ing], girdl[ing], mark[ing], lop[ping], top[ping], uproot[ing] or burn[ing] any tree, or strip[ping] off the bark or leav[ing] from, or otherwise damag[ing], the same." The punishment for offenses that involved "any scheduled timber" was a minimum two years' imprisonment and up to five years' imprisonment and a minimum 7.500 and up to 20,000 rupee fine.

The act prohibited many other activities, including "shoot[ing], fish[ing], poison[ing] water or set[ting] traps or snares" against any government rules, "pastur[ing] cattle," and "clear[ing], cultivat[ing] or break[ing] up any land for cultivation or any other purpose". The punishment for these and other offenses was up to six months' imprisonment and/or a 500 rupee fine.

== Consequences ==
The act was one of the factors contributing to the Rampa Rebellion of 1922.
