= Padmanabham =

- Neighborhood
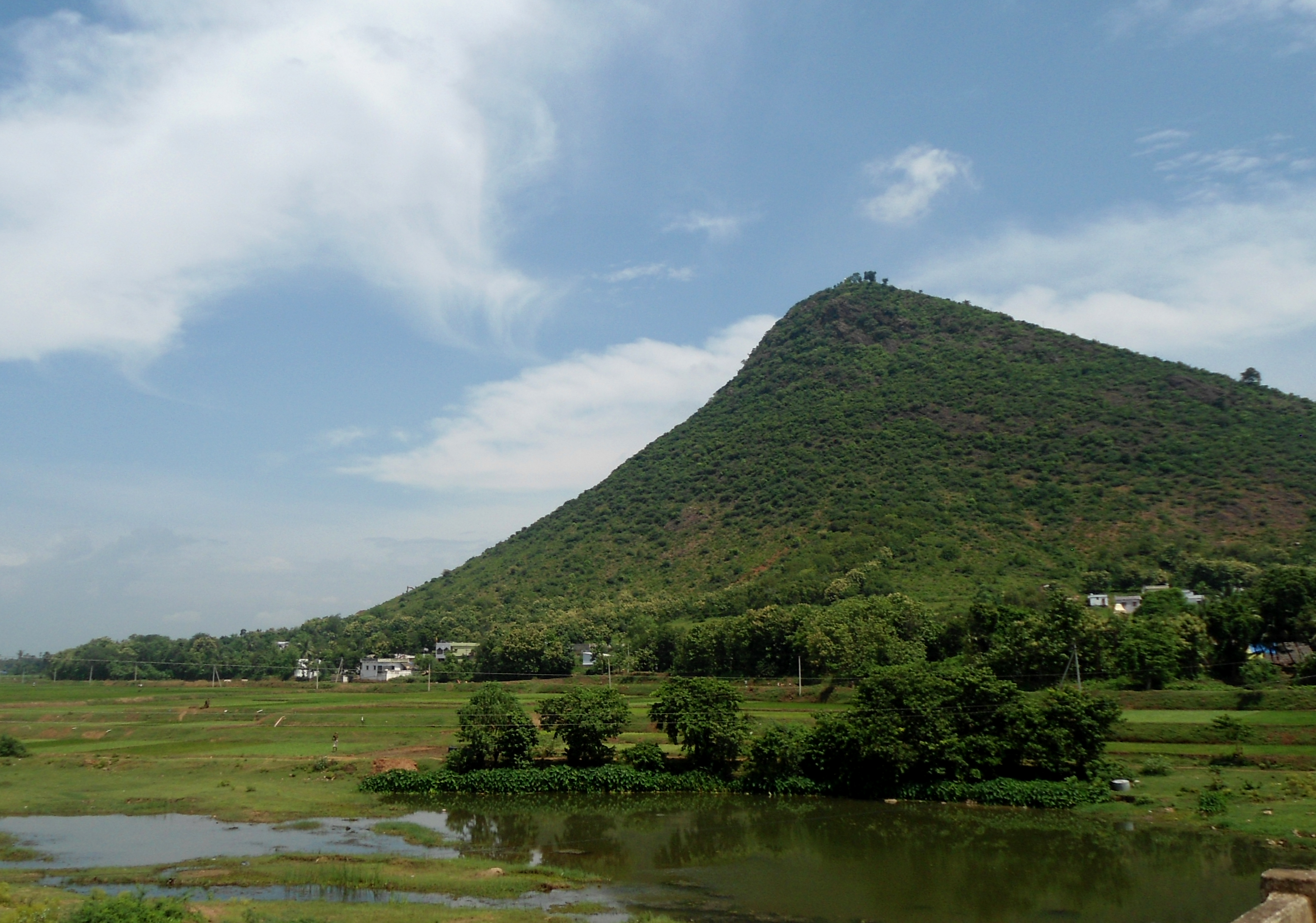
- View of Padmanabham Hillock and River Gosthani

- Location in Andhra Pradesh
- Coordinates: 17.990284°N 83.335387°E
- Country: India
- State: Andhra Pradesh
- District: Visakhapatnam

Area
  - Total: 149.86 km^{2} (57.86 sq mi)
- Elevation: 23 m (75 ft)

Population
  - Total: 49,622
  - Density: 331.12/km^{2} (857.60/sq mi)

Languages
  - Official: Telugu
- Time zone: UTC+5:30 (IST)
- Vehicle Registration: AP31 (Former); AP39 (from 30 January 2019)

Padmanabham mandal is one of the 46 mandals in Visakhapatnam District in India. It is under the administration of Bhemunipatnam revenue division and the headquarters is located at Padmanabham. The Mandal is bounded by Bheemunipatnam, Anandapuram mandals in Visakhapatnam District and Bhogapuram mandal in Vizianagaram District. Great freedom fighter Alluri Sitarama Raju was born in Pandrangi village in this Mandal.Rajasagi Suryanarayana Raju, MLA Bheemili from 1972–78 is from this Mandal. Also Rajasagi Appalanarasimha Raju MLA Bheemili from 1985 to 2004 is also from this Mandal.

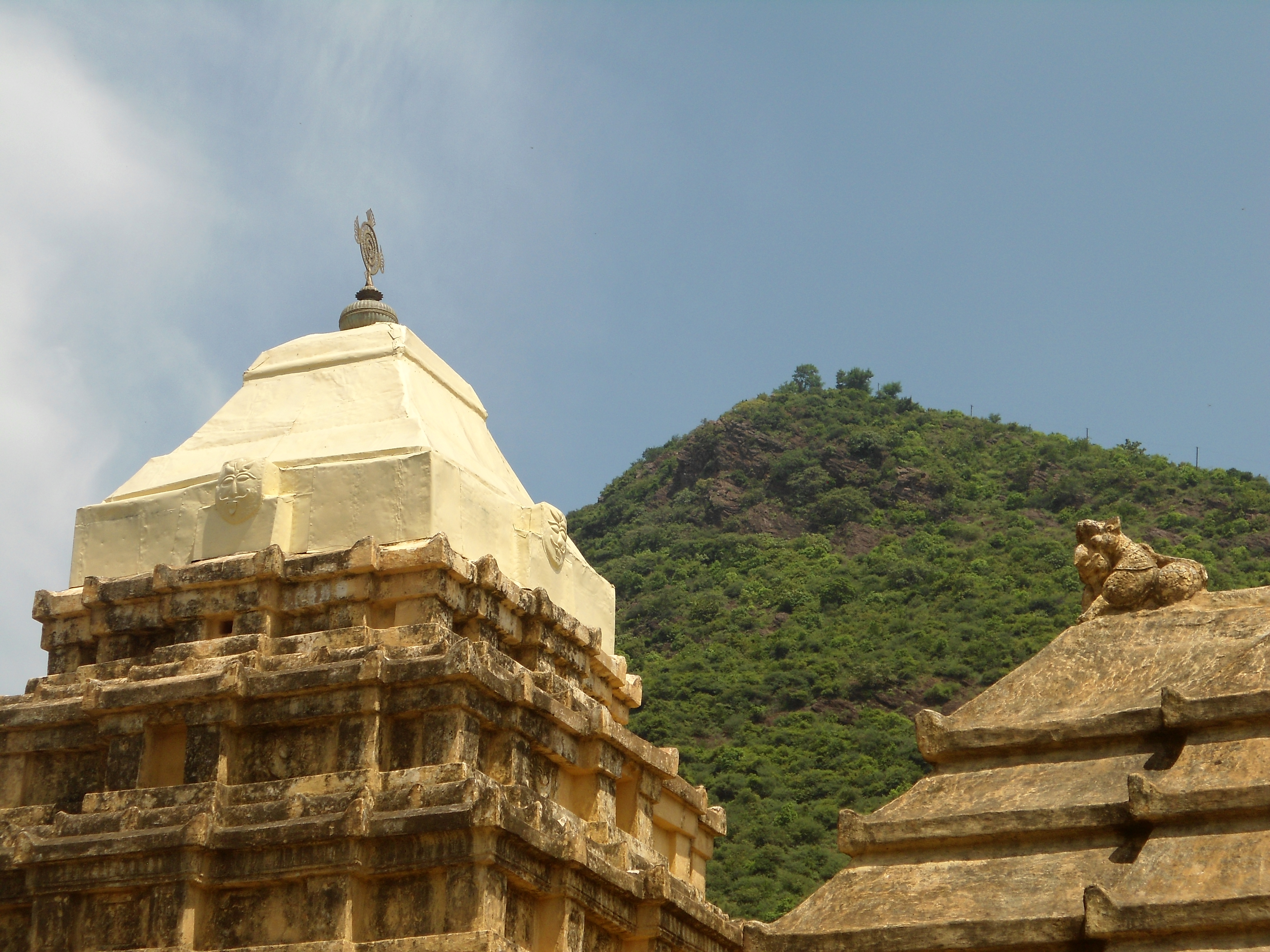
View from Lower Padmanabham Temple

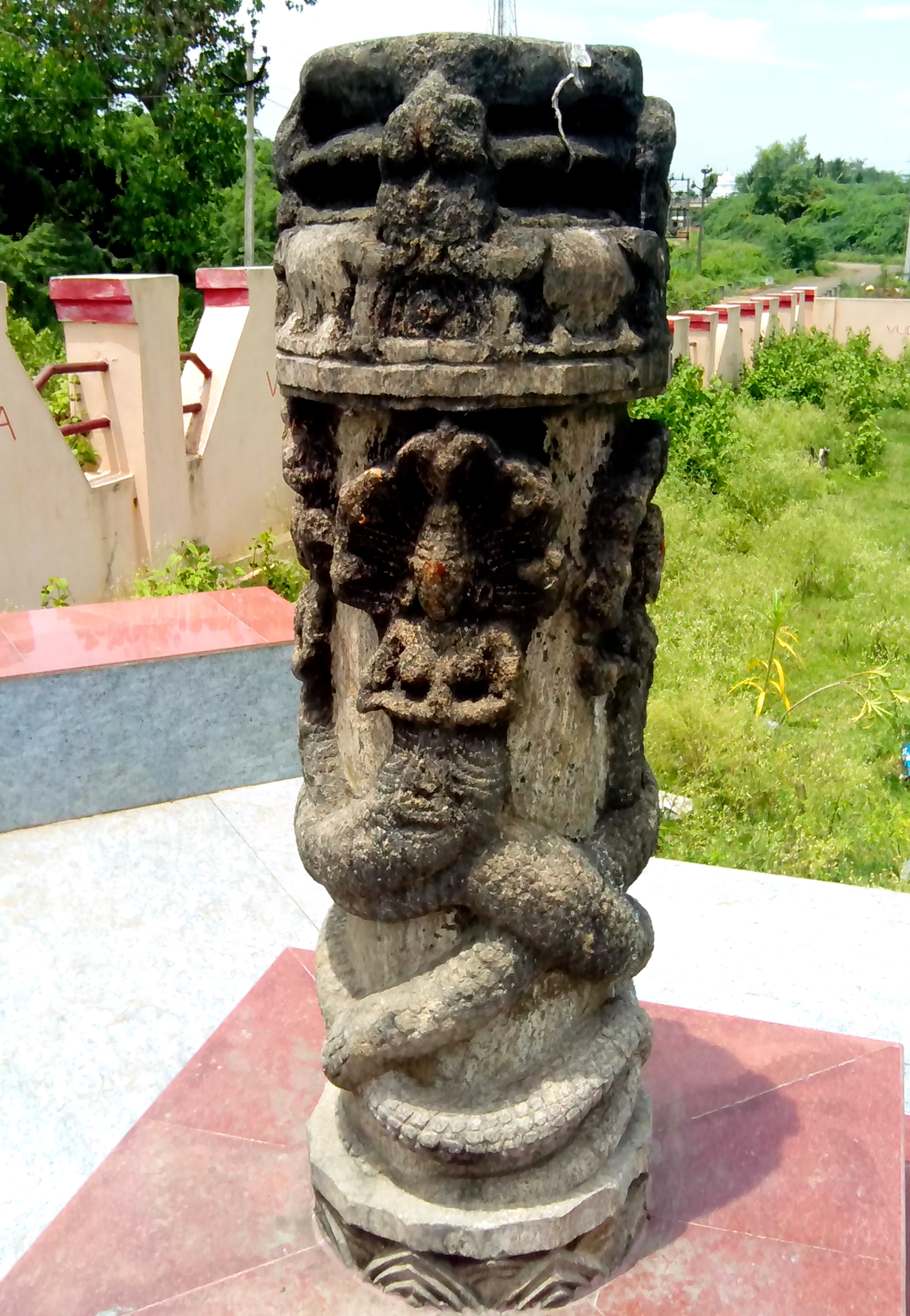
Sri Krishna Devaraya Vijayastambha (Victory Pillar) at Potnuru in Padmanabham Mandal of Visakhapatnam District, Andhra Pradesh

There's a famous Ananta Padmanabha Swami Temple in this mandal. Before independence, this temple was allotted 3,000 acres by the Pusapati royal family of Vizianagaram and the "Raja Sagi" royal family of Pandrangi.

== Geography ==
Padmanabham is located at 17.9833°N 83.3333°E. It has an average elevation of 23 metres (78 feet)

== Battle of Padmanabham ==
The Battle Of Padmanabham was fought on July 9, 1794, between the British, led by Colonel Pendergast, and Pusapati Vijaya Rama Raju II of Vizianagaram. The Vizianagaram forces were led by Raja Sagi Rama Chandra Raju of the Pandrangi mokhasa family. The Raja of Vizianagaram was found in arrears of paying annual taxes to the British as he opposed British governance over his principality. Earlier, the chieftains of Vizianagaram aided French and later British in conquering the neighbouring principalities. However, they later fell out with their foreign allies.

Colonel Pendergast was sent by the Governor of Madras, John Andrews. Both the Raja and his commander were killed, along with 800 soldiers of Vizianagaram, allowing the British to gain full control over the tiny principality. After the death of Pusapati Vijayarama Raju II, his son Pusapati Narayana Raju was guarded by the Raja Sagi family until 1796, when he was crowned king of the Vizianagaram estate.

== Transport ==
APSRTC routes

Route number	Start	End	Via
700	Simhachalam	Vizianagaram	Adavivaram, SR Puram, Shontyam, Gidijala, Boni, Padbanabham
541P	Maddilapalem	Padbanabham	Gurudwar, Birla Junction, NAD Kotharoad, Gopalapatnam, Vepagunta, Pendurthi, Shontyam, Gidijala, Boni
222P	RTC Complex/ Railway Station	Padbanabham	Maddilapalem, Hanumantuwaka, Yendada, Madhurawada, Anandapuram, Gidijala, Boni
