= A. S. Rao =

Indian scientist and company founder

Ayyagari Sambasiva Rao
- Born: 20 September 1914; Mogallu, West Godavari district
- Died: 31 October 2003 (aged 89); Hyderabad
- Citizenship: India
- Education: Banaras Hindu University, Uttar Pradesh, Stanford University
- Awards: Padma Bhushan Award

Ayyagari Sambasiva Rao (popularly known as A. S. Rao) (1914–2003) was an Indian scientist and founder of Electronics Corporation of India Limited (ECIL), Hyderabad, Telangana, India.

He completed his M.Sc. in physics from Banaras Hindu University and then Masters in Electrical Engineering from Stanford University.

== Awards and honors ==
Rao represented India at numerous international conferences on scientific development including UN conferences on peaceful uses of atomic energy. He also served on the editorial and advisory boards of many scientific journals including many international journals of repute.

In recognition of his services to the nation has brought Rao many awards and honors:

- Padma Shri Award in 1960,
- Shanti Swaroop Bhatnagar Award for Engineering Sciences in 1965,
- Doctor of Science degree, honoris causa, from Andhra University in 1969,
- Padma Bhushan in 1972,
- Fellow of Indian Academy of Sciences in 1974,
- FICCI Award for outstanding achievement in Engineering in 1976, *National design Award from Institution of Engineers (India) in 1977,
- Outstanding Scientist Award from A.P. Academy of Science in 1988, Prof.
- Nayudamma Memorial Gold Medal in 1989.
- A.S.Rao Nagar (near ECIL) in Secunderabad was named in his honour
- Postal stamp was released on 16 November 2014 on the occasion of his birth centenary.

== Legacy ==
A. S. Rao Nagar is a major suburb of Hyderabad named after Rao. A biography titled The Man with a Vision was written on Rao by his friend D. Mohana Rao.
