= Chintapalle =

Chintapalle or Chintapalli is name of places in Andhra Pradesh and Telangana:

- Chintapalli, Alluri Sitharama Raju district, a village and mandal in Alluri Sitharama Raju district
- Chintapalli, Vizianagaram district, a village in Vizianagaram district
- Chintapalle, Guntur district, is a village Guntur district
- Chintapally, Nalgonda district, a village and mandal in Nalgonda district
