= Pandrangi =

- Village
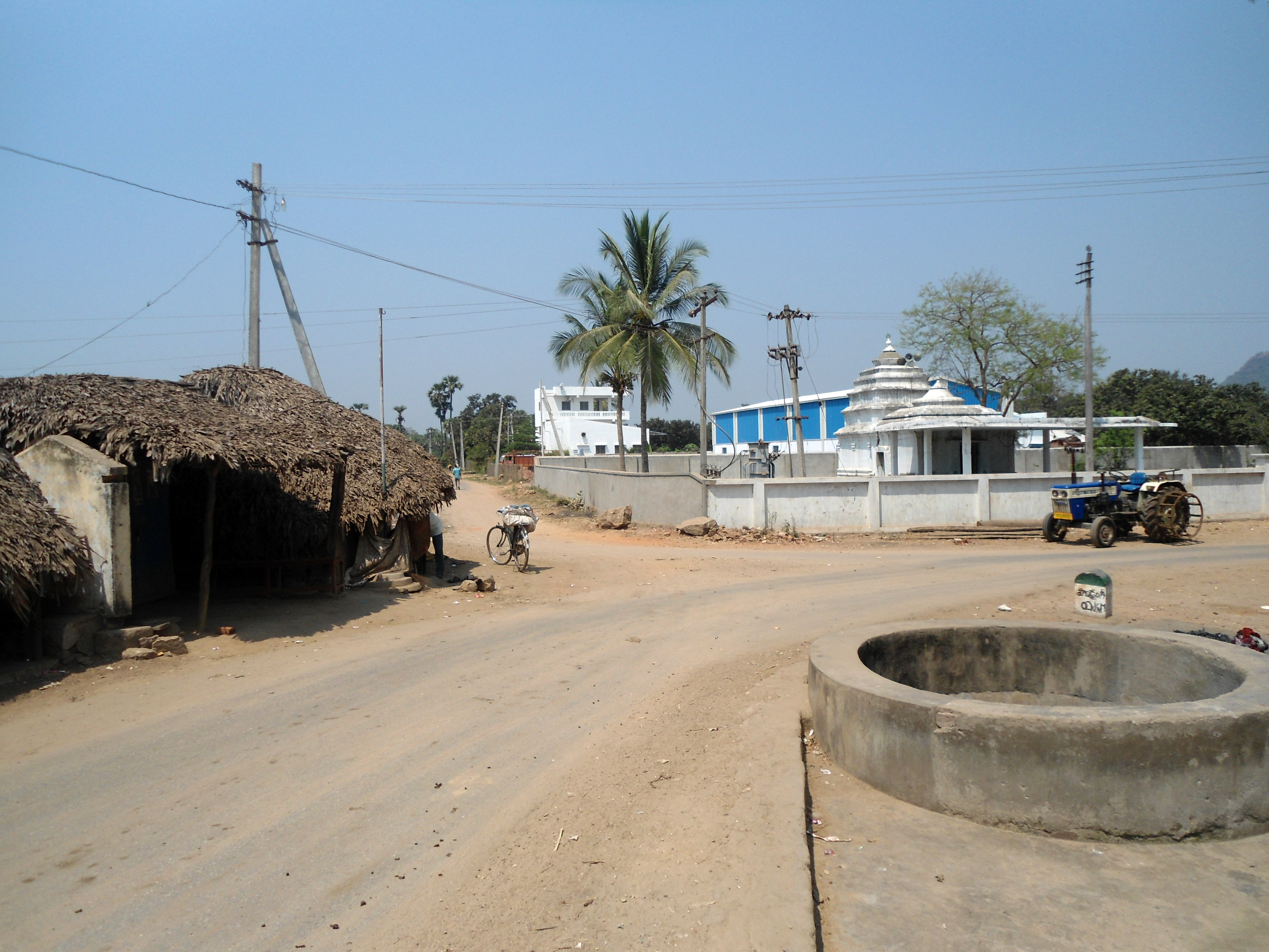
- Pandrangi Village
- Interactive map of Pandrangi
- Location in Andhra Pradesh, India Pandrangi (India)
- Coordinates: 17.9833°N 83.3333°E
- Country: India
- State: Andhra Pradesh
- District: Visakhapatnam
- Elevation: 23 m (75 ft)

Languages
  - Official: Telugu
- Time zone: UTC+5:30 (IST)

Pandrangi is a village in Padmanabham mandal in the Visakhapatnam district of Andhra Pradesh, Freedom fighter Alluri Sitarama Raju was born in this village.It is 6 km from the Mandal headquarters Padmanabham and 15 km from the nearest town Bheemunipatnam. As per the 2011 Census of India, the village has a population of 5398 in 1300 households spread over an area of 1308 hectares. The village has a population of 2684 males and 2714 females.

== Geography ==
Pandrangi is located at 17.9833°N 83.3333°E. It has an average elevation of 23 meters (78 feet).
