= Lanka Sundaram =

Indian politician

Member of Parliament, Lok Sabha
- In office 1952–1957 Serving with Gam Malludora
- Preceded by: Constituency established
- Succeeded by: Pusapati Vijayarama Gajapati Raju
- Constituency: Visakhapatnam

Personal details
- Born: 1 January 1905 Chodavaram
- Died: 8 January 1967 (aged 62)
- Education: University of Oxford
- Occupation: Lawyer

Lanka Sundaram (Telugu: లంక సుందరం) (1 January 1905 – 8 January 1967) was an Indian politician and an expert in international law.

== Life ==
He was born in Chodavaram. He did his primary education at Noble College, Machilipatnam. During an oration, Maharajah of Baroda, Sayaji Rao Gaekwad sponsored his education in England. He studied at University of Oxford in International Law. In 1929, he qualified in the Indian Civil Service examination. But the British Government refused to give him a government job. Hence he has concentrated on social service.

He was elected to the first Lok Sabha in 1952 from Visakhapatnam constituency. He was openly criticized during the parliamentary discussions on various issues in the country during the early period after Indian independence.

He was a footballer. He wrote many books and was the editor of Commerce and Industry. His books are chosen for university syllabi and often used as reference material. India in World Politics is his main book.

== Committee on Public Undertakings ==
Lanka Sundaram, an Independent member of the Indian Parliament moved a resolution and initiated the discussion on the need for setting up a Parliamentary Committee on Public Undertakings to focus on the broader policy and operational issues concerning public enterprises. The resolution was adopted in December 1953 and the committee was set up in 1964.

== Publications ==
- Mughal Land Revenue System, Woking, Surrey, England: Basheer Muslim Library, 1929
- The international aspects of Indian emigration, London: East and West, 1930
- India in World Politics, Delhi: Rajkamal Publications, 1944
- A secular state for India; thoughts on Indiaʼs political future (1944)
- India Analysed, Volume I, International (1933) along with Alfred Zimmern; Manning, C.A.W.; Keith, Arthur Berriedale; Jenks, C.W.
