= Kotia (tribe) =

Kotia Tribe, also known as Kotia Paika, are one of the endogamous section of Paika community who are known for their past history of military service under the then kings and feudal chiefs of south Odisha.

The Kotia tribe is a small hill tribe of Odisha, India. They live in Koraput, Malkangiri, Phulbani, and Kalahandi districts of southern Odisha and in the border areas of adjacent Andhra Pradesh. They are a scheduled tribe, which means that they are officially recognized as a tribal community and receive certain benefits from the government.

The Kotia are known for their past history of military service under the then kings and feudal chiefs of south Odisha. They are a brave and warlike people, and their martial skills are still evident in their traditional dances and festivals.

The Kotia are a matrilineal society, which means that property and inheritance are passed down through the female line. Women play an important role in Kotia society, and they are often the heads of households. The Kotia are a followed by Hindu tribe, but they also have a strong belief in their own traditional religion. They worship a number of gods and goddesses, including the sun god, the tiger god, and the earth goddess.

The Kotia are known to be a colorful and vibrant people with a culture that is a rich and diverse mix of Hindu, tribal, and military traditions.

The Kotia tribe speaks the language Kotia, which is a dialect of the Odia language. They are known for their unique style of dance, which is called the Kotia Paika dance. They are thought to be skilled blacksmiths and carpenters, and determined to preserve their culture and traditions.

The Kotia tribe is a group of people in Odisha.

They are a small hill tribe inhabiting Odisha and Andhra border area. The community is divided into two endogamous groups i.e. Bodo Kotia and Sano Kotia, which are further divided into a number of totemistic exogamous clans (Vansa/Ghatra) like Khara (Sun), Naga-Onthalu (Cobra), Goripitta (a bird), Bagha/Killo/Pulli (tiger), Macha (fish), Bhall (bear), Khilo, Hanu (monkey), Khinbudi, Sukri and Pangi (a kite), etc.

Kotia family is nuclear, patrilocal, patrilineal and patriarchal. Monogamy is common norm and the custom of bride price is prevalent.

Marriage through negotiation is regarded as ideal. Cross cousin marriage and marriage by elopement and by service, junior levirate, junior sororate, remarriage of widow, widower and divorcees are allowed in their society. Inheritance of paternal property follows the rule of male equigeniture. They observe puberty rite for adolescent girls (Kanya uthani).

Kotia Tribe have their own traditional community council headed by Nayak who is assisted by their sacred specialist Dissari, Pujari, Guru and their messenger the Barik/Chalan.

Their most important deity is Dharu devata (Tree God) Mauli Debta, whose shrine lies under a kendu tree in their village. Nisanigudi is their goddess who protects them from smallpox. Both deities are worshipped in the month of Chaitra (March–April).
