= Kalipatnam =

- Village
- Interactive map of Kalipatnam
- Location in Andhra Pradesh, India Kalipatnam (India)
- Coordinates: 16.390443°N 81.529472°E
- Country: India
- State: Andhra Pradesh
- District: West Godavari

Government
  - Type: Panchayati raj

Population (2011 records)
  - Total: 11,839

Languages
  - Official: Telugu
- Time zone: UTC+5:30 (IST)
- PIN: 534281
- Telephone code: 08814
- Vehicle registration: AP-37

Kalipatnam is a village in West godavari district of the Indian state Andhra Pradesh. Lankalakoderu railway Station, Narasapur railway Station are the nearest railway stations.

== Geography ==
Kalipatnam is located at coordinates of 16.390443°N 81.529472°E.

== Demographics ==
As of 2011 Census of India, Kalipatnam had a population of 11839. The total population constitute, 5832 males and 6007 females with a sex ratio of 1030 females per 1000 males. 1183 children are in the age group of 0–6 years, with sex ratio of 975. The average literacy rate stands at 68.00%.
