= Krishnadevipeta =

Krishnadevipeta K. D. Peta
- Village
- Interactive map of Krishnadevipeta
- Location in Andhra Pradesh, India
- Coordinates: 17.6727°N 82.3789°E
- Country: India
- State: Andhra Pradesh
- District: Anakapalli

Languages
  - Official: Telugu
- Time zone: UTC+5:30 (IST)
- PIN: 531084
- Telephone code: 08937
- Vehicle registration: AP
- Vidhan Sabha constituency: Narsipatnam
- Lok Sabha constituency: Anakapalli

Krishnadevipeta popularly known by its abbreviated form K. D. Peta, is a village in Golugonda mandal of Anakapalli district in the state of Andhra Pradesh, India. It lies 111 km west of Visakhapatnam city. This village is known for the location of tomb of freedom fighter Alluri Sitarama Raju.

== Location and Geography ==
Krishnadevipeta is located 111 km west of Visakhapatnam city. It is 28 km away from Narsipatnam. Krishndevipeta is located at 17.6719514°N 82.3695988°E.
