= Mogallu =

Village in Andhra Pradesh, India

Coordinates: 16°36′N 81°34′E

Mogallu is a village in Palakoderu mandal, located 10 kilometres (6.2 mi) from Bhimavaram Town in West Godavari district, Andhra Pradesh, India

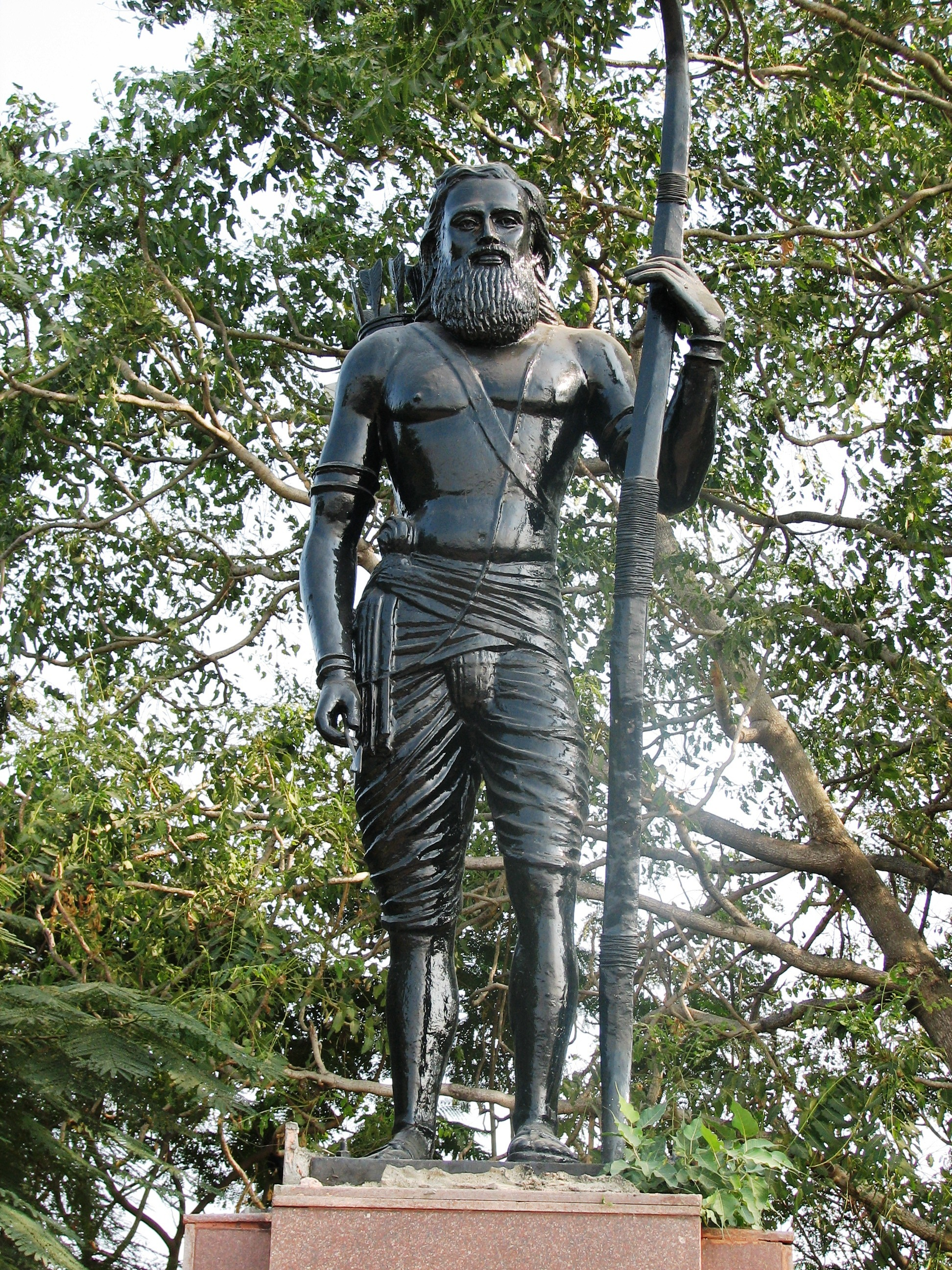
Alluri Sita Rama Raju statue

== Demographics ==
According to Indian census, 2011, the demographic details of Mogallu Village is as follows:

- No of Households: 2041
- Persons: 7102
- Males: 3,517
- Females: 3,585

== Notable people born in the village ==
- Freedom Fighter Alluri Sitarama Raju
- Eminent Scientist Ayyagari Sambasiva Rao
- Minister, Former MLA MLC Karnataka, India N. S. Boseraju
