= Koyyuru =

- Village
- Interactive map of Koyyuru
- Location in Andhra Pradesh, India Koyyuru (India)
- Coordinates: 17.6667°N 82.2333°E
- Country: India
- State: Andhra Pradesh
- District: Alluri Sitharama Raju
- Elevation: 275 m (902 ft)

Languages
  - Official: Telugu
- Time zone: UTC+5:30 (IST)
- PIN: 531087
- Telephone code: 08937
- Vehicle Registration: AP31 (Former); AP39 (from 30 January 2019)

Koyyuru is a village and a Mandal in Alluri Sitharama Raju district in the state of Andhra Pradesh in India.

== Geography ==
Koyyuru is located at 17.6667°N 82.2333°E. It has an average elevation of 275 meters (905 feet).
