= Dumbriguda =

- Village
- Interactive map of Dumbriguda
- Location in Andhra Pradesh, India
- Coordinates: 18.288058°N 82.79195°E
- Country: India
- State: Andhra Pradesh
- District: Alluri Sitharama Raju

Languages
  - Official: Telugu
- Time zone: UTC+5:30 (IST)
- PIN: 532 xxx
- Telephone code: 91–8936
- Vehicle Registration: AP31 (Former); AP39 (from 30 January 2019)

Dumbriguda is a village and mandal headquarters of Dumbriguda mandal in the Sankaram forest block of Alluri Sitharama Raju district in the state of Andhra Pradesh in India.
