= Paderu =

- Village
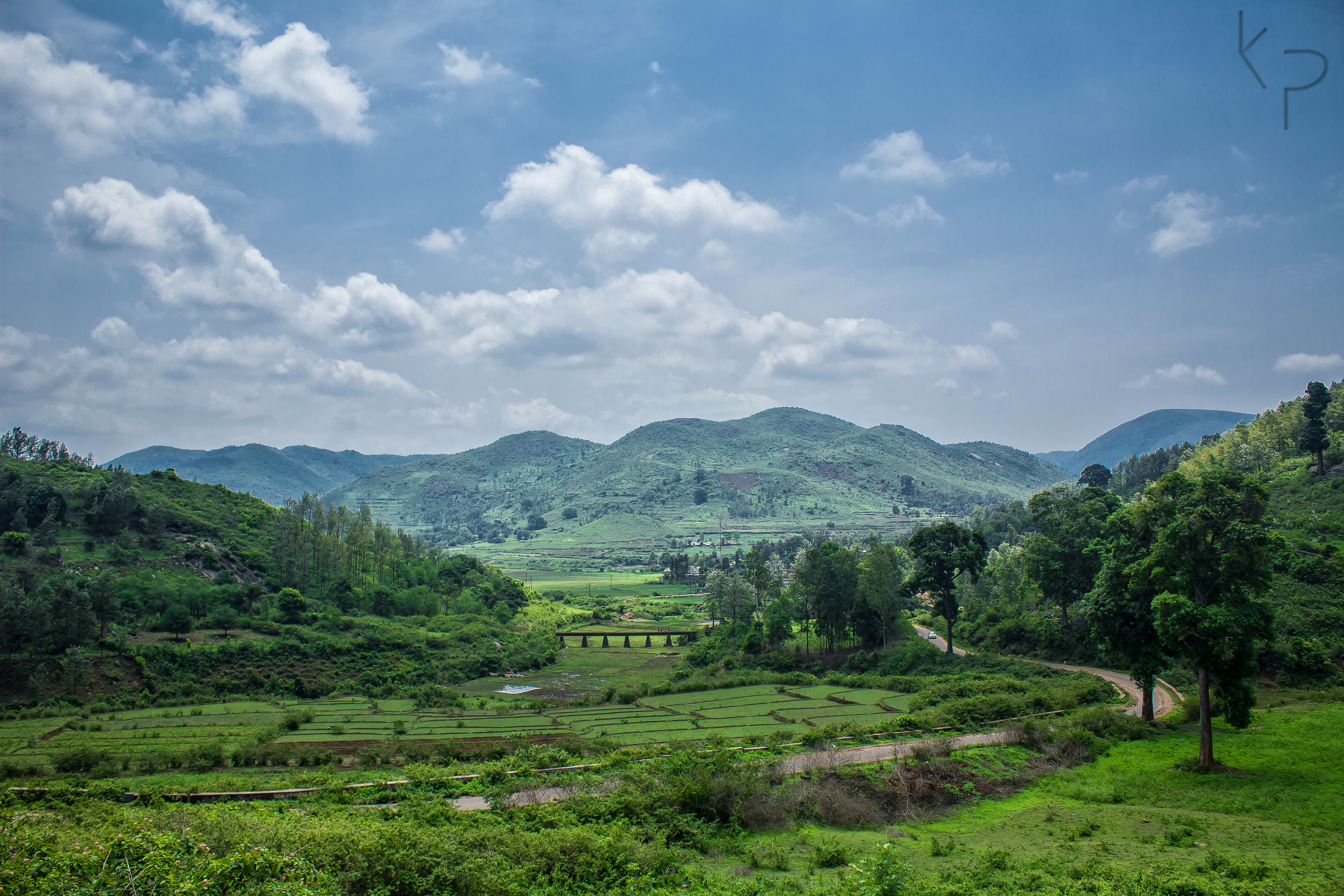
- View of Eastern Ghats near Paderu
- Interactive map of Paderu
- Location in Andhra Pradesh, India
- Coordinates: 18.0833°N 82.6667°E
- Country: India
- State: Andhra Pradesh
- District: Alluri Sitharama Raju

Government
  - MLA: Vishweshwara Rao
- Elevation: 904 m (2,966 ft)

Languages
  - Official: Telugu
- Time zone: UTC+5:30 (IST)
- PIN: 531 024
- Vehicle Registration: AP31 (Former); AP39 (from 30 January 2019)

Paderu is a village located in the Indian state of Andhra Pradesh. It is the administrative headquarters of ASR district, and the Headquarters of Paderu revenue division and Paderu Mandal.

== Geography ==
Paderu is located at 18.0833°N 82.667°E. It has an average elevation of 904 meters (2,969 feet).
