= Gam Malludora =

Indian politician and tribal leader

Member of Parliament, Lok Sabha
- In office 1952–1957 Serving with Lanka Sundaram
- Preceded by: Constituency established
- Succeeded by: Pusapati Vijayarama Gajapati Raju
- Constituency: Visakhapatnam

Personal details
- Born: 1900 Visakhapatnam district
- Died: 1969 (aged 68–69)
- Party: Indian National Congress
- Spouse: Atchamma
- Children: 1 daughter

Gam Malludora (1900–1969) was an Indian politician and tribal leader who served as a Member of Parliament from Visakhapatnam Lok Sabha constituency. He was born in [Nadimpalem] village Koyyuru mandal of Visakhapatnam district, Andhra Pradesh, in 1900, his belongings to Bagata tribal community. He was the younger brother of Gam Gantamdora. Their father was Gam Boggudora.

The Gam brothers were close associates of Alluri Sitarama Raju during his tribal fights, attacking the police stations of Krishna Devi Peta, Addateegala and Annavaram and procuring ammunition for their assault missions. However, he took shelter in a house in 1923. During this time, the British arrested him and prosecuted him with the death sentence. On his appeal, the death sentence was changed in 1924 to life imprisonment at Andaman Jail. He was released in 1937 on the perusal of Congress politicians. In this way, he became the only associate of Raju to survive the British assault.

He was elected to the 1st Lok Sabha from Visakhapatnam constituency in 1952 as an Independent candidate along with Lanka Sundaram.
