= Alluri Sitharama Raju district =

New district in Andhra Pradesh, India

Alluri Sitharama Raju district Alluri district, ASR district
- District of Andhra Pradesh
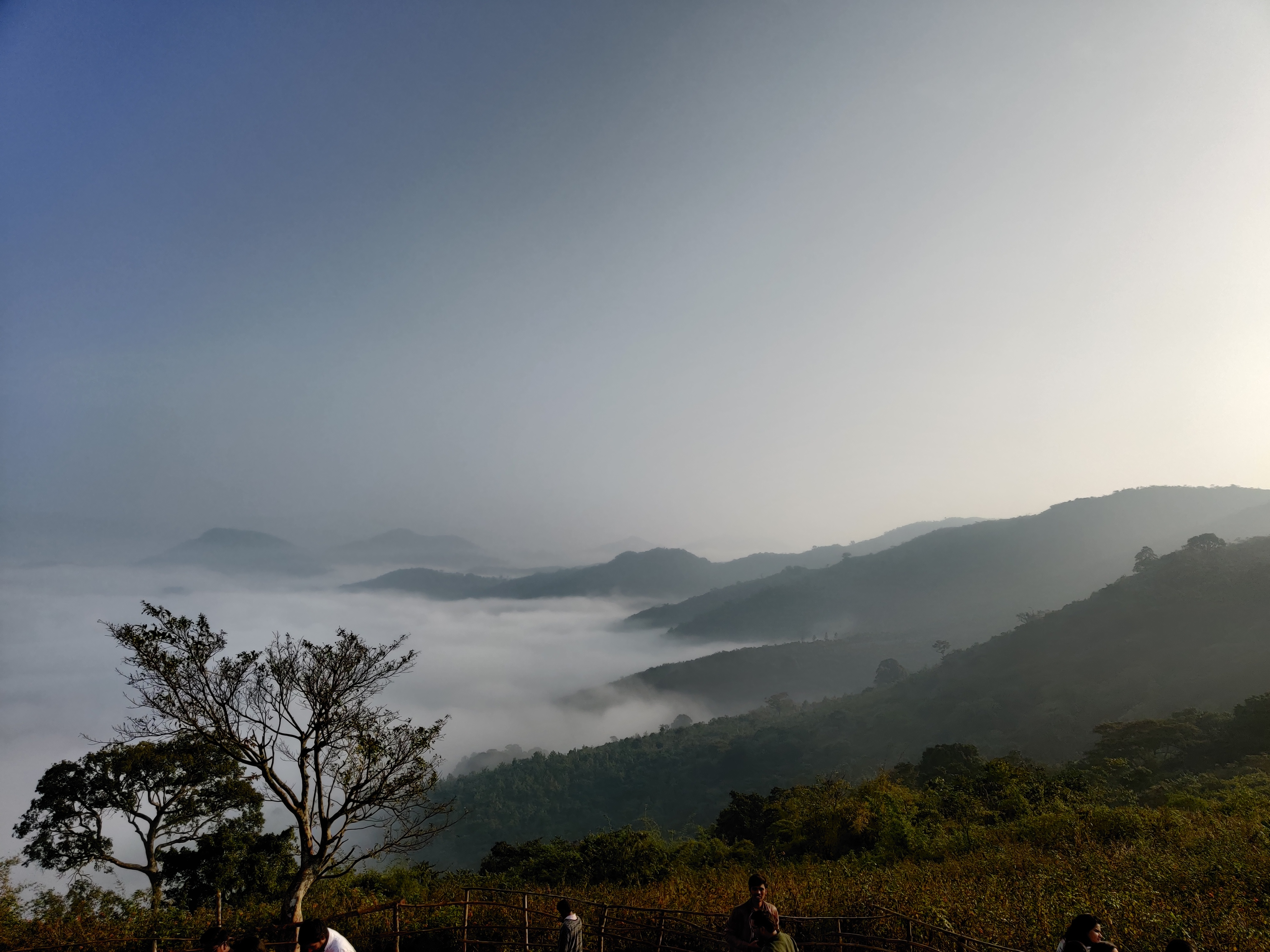
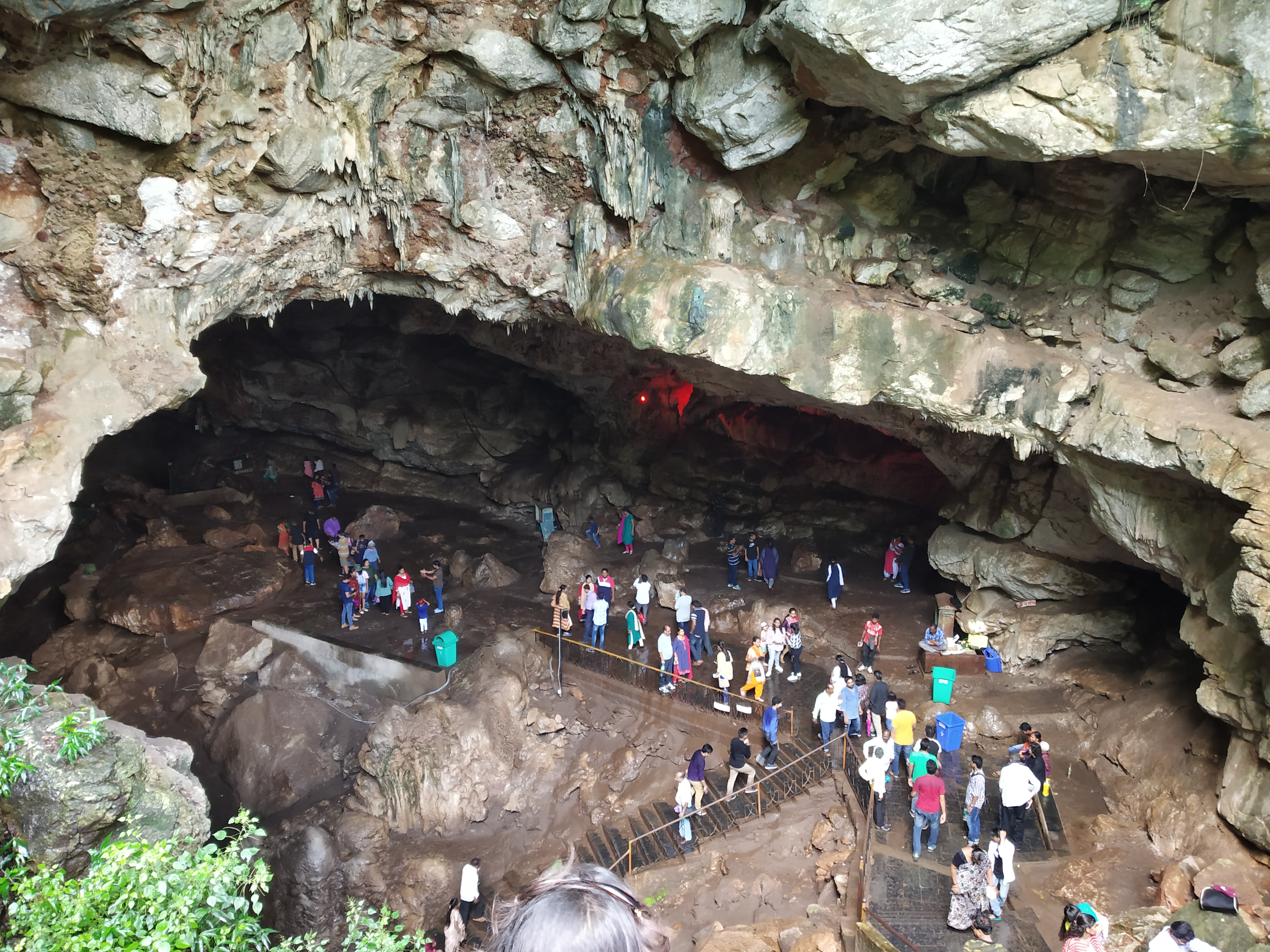
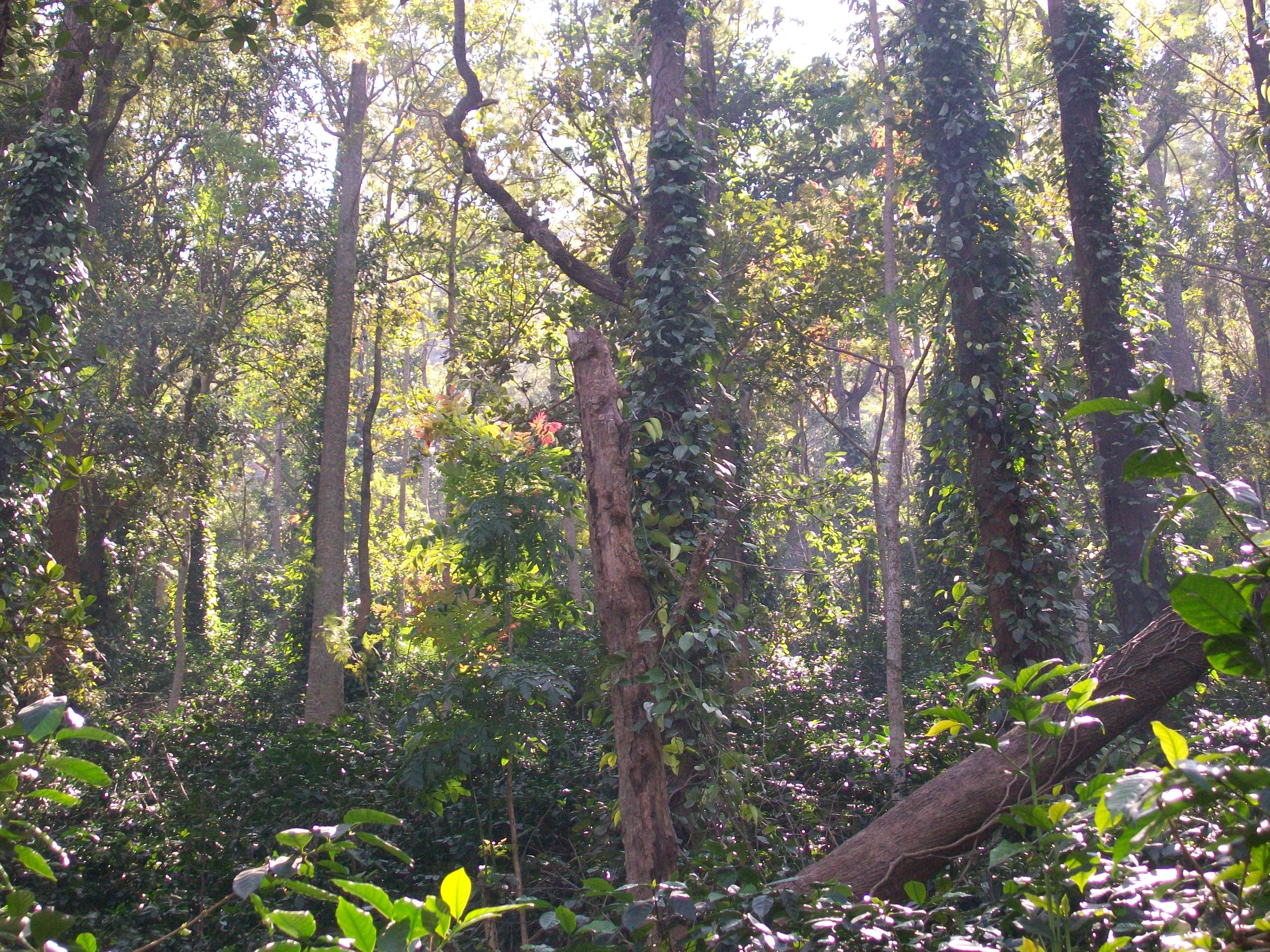
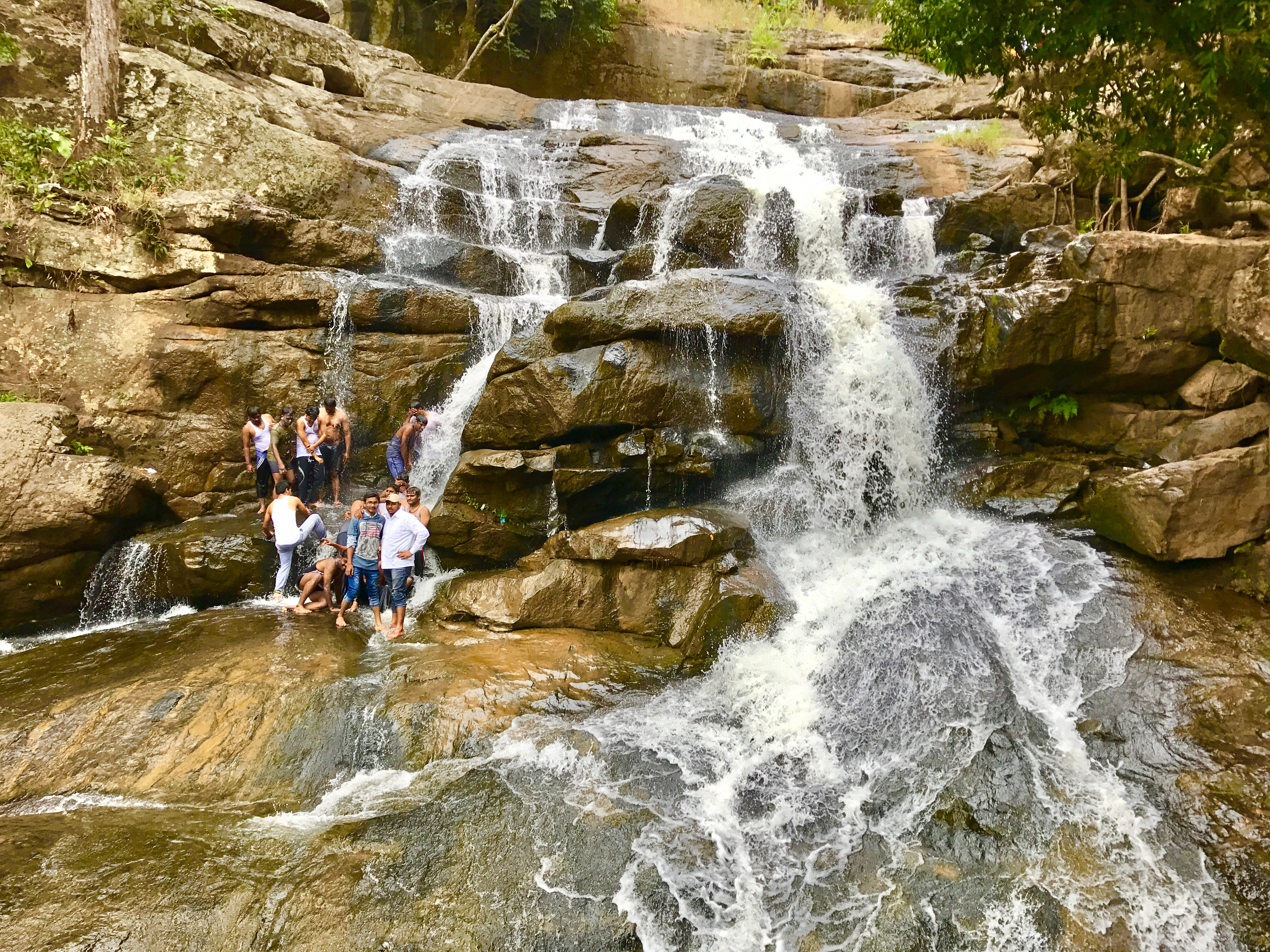
- Clockwise from T top left: Eastern Ghats at Lambasingi, Borra Caves, Chintapalle Falls, Coffee plantations at Araku Valley

- Location of Alluri district in Andhra Pradesh
- Interactive map of Alluri Sitharama Raju district
- Coordinates: 18.08°N 82.67°E
- Country: India
- State: Andhra Pradesh
- Region: Uttara Andhra
- First formed: 4 April 2022
- Reorganized: 31 December 2025 (Polavaram district)
- Founder: Government of Andhra Pradesh
- Named for: Alluri Sitarama Raju
- Headquarters: Paderu
- Administrative divisions: 1 revenue divisions; 11 mandals

Government
  - District collector and magistrate: A.S. Dinesh Kumar IAS
  - Superintendent of Police: Amit Bardar IPS
  - Lok Sabha constituencies: 01 constituency
  - Assembly constituencies: 2 constituencies

Demographics
- Time zone: UTC+05:30 (IST)
- District LGD code: 745
- District abbreviation: LLR
- Website: allurisitharamaraju.ap.gov.in

Alluri Sitharama Raju district, also known as Alluri district and by its initials as ASR district, is a district in the Indian state of Andhra Pradesh. The headquarters of the district is located at Paderu. Named after Alluri Sitarama Raju, a revolutionary in the Indian independence movement who hailed from the region. The district is known for its scenery and lies in the Eastern Ghats.

== Etymology ==
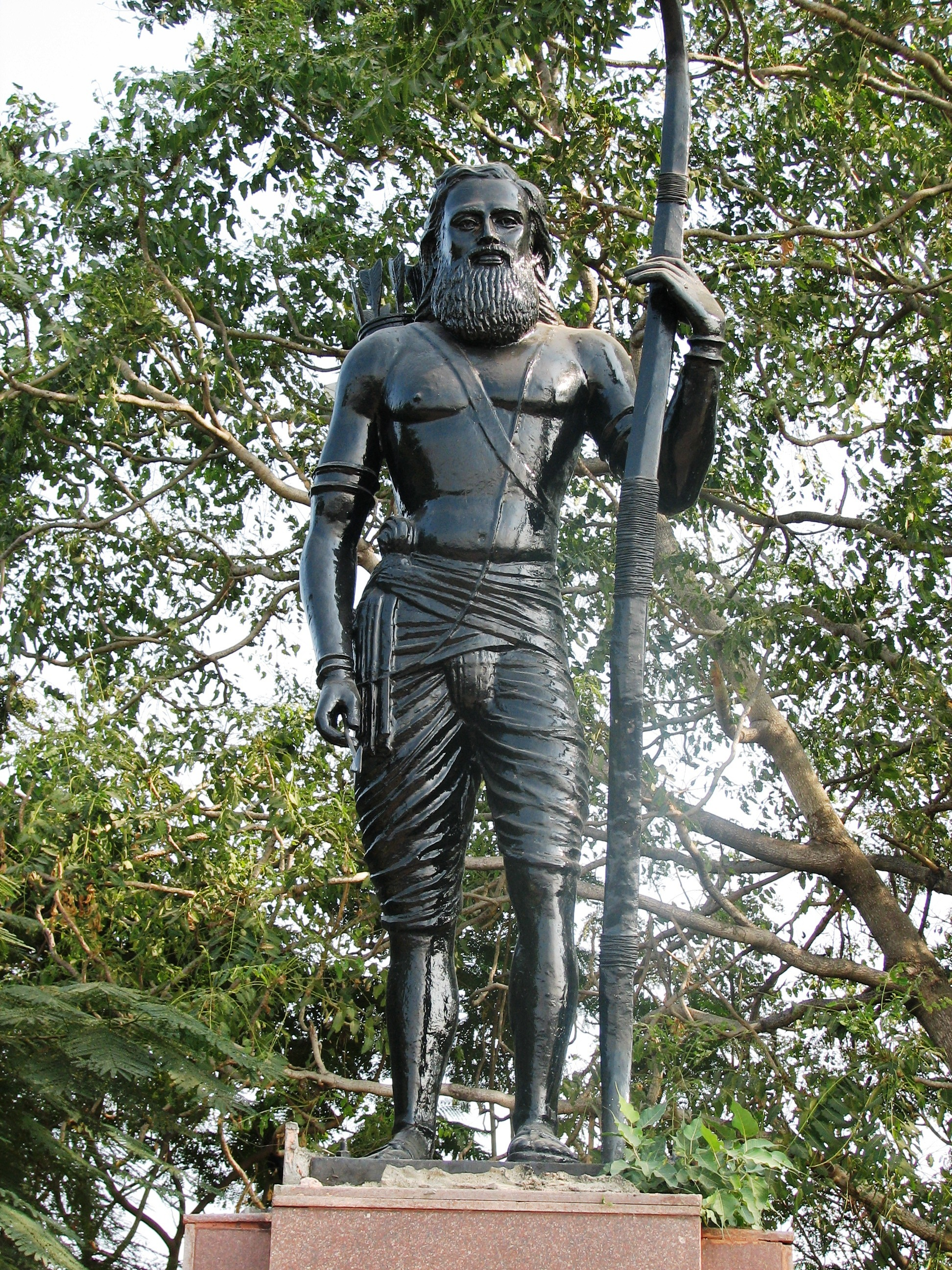
A statue of Alluri Sitarama Raju

This district is named after Alluri Sitarama Raju, a revolutionary in the Indian independence movement who came from the region.

== History ==
In July 2019, on the occasion of Alluri Sitarama Raju's 122nd birth anniversary, state Tourism Minister Avanthi Srinivasa Rao said a newly formed district would be named after Alluri Sitarama Raju. The district was proposed on 26 January 2022 by the Y. S. Jagan Mohan Reddy's government as part of a reorganisation of all the existing 13 districts in the state to form 26 districts in total. Final notification was issued by the Government of Andhra Pradesh on 3 April 2022 and the district was effective from 4 April 2022. The administrative headquarters of the district is located at Paderu. It was formed from Paderu revenue division of Visakhapatnam district and Rampachodavaram revenue division of East Godavari district.

On December 31st 2025, Rampachodavaram division was carved out of this district and formed as a new district named Polavaram district.

== Geography ==
The district is bordered to the north by Malkangiri district and Koraput district in Odisha, to the west by Polavaram district, to the south by Anakapalli district, and to the east by Vizianagaram district and Parvathipuram Manyam districts.

== Administrative divisions ==
The district has one revenue division, namely Paderu, which is further subdivided into a total of 11 mandals, each administered by a Tahsildar.

=== Mandals ===
There are 11 mandals located in Alluri Sitharama Raju district, which are under Paderu revenue division, are listed below.

- Paderu revenue division
1. Ananthagiri
2. Araku Valley
3. Chinthapalli
4. Dumbriguda
5. Ganagaraju Madugula
6. Gudem Kotha Veedhi
7. Hukumpeta
8. Koyyuru
9. Munchingiputtu
10. Paderu
11. Pedabayalu

== Cities and towns ==
There are no cities or towns in the district. Major villages are Araku and Padern

Major villages in Alluri Sitharama Raju District
S.No.	Name	Civic status	Revenue division	Population (2011 census)
1	Araku	Gram Panchayat	Paderu	56,674
2	Paderu	Gram Panchayat	Paderu	20,760
3	Chintapalli	Major Gram Panchayat	Paderu	9888

== Demographics ==
Religions in Alluri Sitarama Raju district (2011)
Religion	Percent
Hinduism	97.35%
Christianity	1.50%
Islam	0.64%
Other or not stated	0.51%
Distribution of religions

The district has a population of 6,04,047. 576,026 is rural and 28,021 (4.64%) is urban. Scheduled Castes and Scheduled Tribes make up 4,154 and 547,951 which is 0.69% and 90.71% of the population respectively.

97.35% of the population is Hindu while 1.50% of the population is Christian and 0.64% is Muslim.

Languages of Alluri Sitarama Raju district (2011)
1. Telugu (66.54%)
2. Odia (17.39%)
3. Kuvi (11.12%)
4. Konda (3.19%)
5. Others (1.76%)

At the time of the 2011 census, 66.54% of the population spoke Telugu, 17.39% Odia, 11.12% Kuvi and 3.19% Konda as their first language.

The district when it was created in 2022 had a population of 953,960, of which 37,973 (3.98%) live in urban areas based on 2011 census data. Alluri Sitarama Raju district had a sex ratio of 1046 females per 1000 males and a literacy rate of 42.34%. Scheduled Castes and Scheduled Tribes made up 2.49% and 82.67% of the population respectively.

The tribals are a mix of peoples: Bhagatha, Konda Dora, Khond, Konda Reddy, Konda Kapu, Parang Proja, Valmiki, Kotia, Nooka Dora, Goudu, Mali and Gadaba.

The vast majority of people are Hindu, with small minorities of Christians and Muslims.

== Politics ==
There is one parliamentary and 3 assembly constituencies in Alluri Sitharama Raju district. The parliamentary constituency is Araku Lok Sabha constituency, which is reserved for Scheduled Tribe candidates.

The assembly constituencies are

Constituency number	Name	Reserved for (SC/ST/None)	Parliament
28	Araku Valley	ST	Araku
29	Paderu	ST	Araku
