= Chintapalli, Alluri Sitharama Raju district =

Chintapalli
- Village
- Location in Andhra Pradesh, India
- Coordinates: 17.8667°N 82.3500°E
- Country: India
- State: Andhra Pradesh
- District: Alluri Sitharama Raju district

Government
  - Type: Major Gram Panchayat
- Elevation: 839 m (2,753 ft)

Languages
  - Official: Telugu
- Time zone: UTC+5:30 (IST)
- PIN: 531111
- Vehicle Registration: AP31 (Former); AP39 (from 30 January 2019)
- Vidhan Sabha constituency: Paderu
- Lok Sabha constituency: Araku

Chintapalli is a major tourist centre . It is a historic town and mandal headquarter in Alluri Sitharama Raju district in the Indian state of Andhra Pradesh.

== Demographics ==
As of the 2011 census, The town has a population of 9,888 of which 5,196 are males and 4,692 are females. Average Sex Ratio of the town is 880 against state average of 993. Population of Children with age of 0-6 is 632 which is 8.01% of total population of Chintapalle. Child Sex Ratio in the town is around 945 compared to Andhra Pradesh state average of 939. Literacy rate of Chintapalle town is 89.80% higher than state average of 67.02%.

== Geography ==
It has an average elevation of 839 meters (2755 feet).

== Legislative assembly ==
Chintapalle is an assembly constituency in Andhra Pradesh until 2009. In the 2009 general elections the Chintapalle assembly constituency was merged into Paderu constituency.

== Eminent persons ==
- Alluri Sitarama Raju - Freedom fighter, Revolutionist and the Leader of the Rampa Rebellion of 1922.
- Gam Malludora - Member of 1st Lok Sabha
