= Podu (agriculture) =

Indian agricultural method

Podu is a traditional system of cultivation used by tribes in India, whereby different areas of jungle forest are cleared by burning each year to provide land for crops. The word comes from the Telugu language.

Podu is a form of shifting agriculture using slash-and-burn methods. Traditionally used on the hill-slopes of Andhra Pradesh, it is similar to the jhum method found in north-east India and the bewar system of Madhya Pradesh. Since the 1930s, there have been attempts to restrict its use in order to conserve forests and permit growth of commercial tree species such as teak. In the 1980s, it remained the principal method of tilling land for some tribal communities in districts such as East Godavari, West Godavari and, most prevalently, Srikakulam, although even by the 1950s its use by the Kolam and Naikpod tribes of Adilabad district had been entirely suppressed. One reason for the difference in treatment is that tribesmen in some districts (e.g. Srikakulam) have violently defended their rights in tandem with Naxalite insurgents, while those in other districts (e.g. Adilabad) did not resist outside interference as strongly.

Ethnologist Christoph von Fürer-Haimendorf has noted that, at least in some areas, the podu system also carried implied land rights. A resident of a village could return to land that they had previously cultivated as part of a rotation without fear of dispute from other villagers, although land that had lain unused for some time was considered to be common property and could be adopted for clearance by any villager. He noted that over the period 1941–1979, which were the occasions of his academic field-work, forest officials had introduced restrictions on use but that these were not as onerous in some places as in others, and that in villages with little flat land there were none at all.
