= 1921 (1988 film) =

1988 Indian Malayalam-language war film

- Theatrical release poster
- Directed by: I. V. Sasi
- Written by: T. Damodaran
- Produced by: Muhammed Mannil
- Starring: Mammootty; Madhu; Suresh Gopi; T. G. Ravi; Seema; Urvashi
- Cinematography: V. Jayaram
- Edited by: K. Narayanan
- Music by: Shyam
- Production company: Mannil Films
- Distributed by: Mannil Films
- Release date: 19 August 1988
- Running time: 170 minutes
- Country: India
- Language: Malayalam
- Budget: ₹1.2 crore
- Box office: est. ₹2 crore

1921 (read as Ayirathi Thollayirathi Irupathi Onnu) is a 1988 Indian Malayalam-language war drama film written by T. Damodaran and directed by I. V. Sasi. The film has an ensemble cast including Mammootty, Madhu, Suresh Gopi, T. G. Ravi, Seema, Urvashi and Mukesh. Set during the 1921–22 Mappila Uprising in Madras Presidency, it tells the fictional story of Khader, a World War I veteran, who joins with the Mappila rebels during the Uprising.

Made with a budget of Rs. 12.0 million, 1921 was then, the most expensive film in Malayalam. The film was released in Kerala on 19 August 1988 during Onam festival. The film won Kerala State Film Award for Best Film with Popular Appeal and Aesthetic Value.

== Plot ==
The film focuses on Mappila bullock cart driver Khader, a retired naik and World War 1 veteran, and Unni Krishnan, a hardline nationalist revolutionary from a family of upper-caste Hindu Nair landlords. Both men join the brigade of Variyan Kunnathu Kunjahammed Haji, one of the prominent leaders of the 1921 Malabar rebellion.

The plot gradually introduces a variety of characters, representing the South Malabar society of the 1920s. The film also touches various social dilemmas which led to the 1921 Uprising, the atrocities committed by the British Indian army and the rebels during the events and the eventual collapse of the rebel unity and organization.

== Cast ==
- Mammootty as retd.Naik Khader, a former soldier and World War 1 veteran
- Madhu as Ali Musliyar
- Suresh Gopi as Unnikrishnan Nambiar
- T. G. Ravi as Variyan Kunnathu Kunjahammed Haji
- Seema as Radha Varma
- Urvashi as Thulasi
- M. G. Soman as Shekhara Varma (Captain, discharged)
- Mukesh as Haidru or Haidrose
- Ratheesh Rajagopal as Lavakkutti
- Bahadoor as Kattilasseri Muhammad Musliyar
- Kollam Ajith as Kunjalavi
- Tom Alter as R. H. Hitchcock Sahib (District Superintendent)
- K. P. Ummer as Amu Sahib (Deputy Superintendent)
- Vijayaraghavan as Kandan Kutti/Muhammad
- Balan K. Nair as Beeran
- Janardhanan as Appunni Nair
- Rohini as Lakshmi
- Parvathy as Aasiya
- Jagannatha Varma as Kunjikuttan Thamburan
- Santhosh as Keshavankutty
- Bheeman Raghu as Abdulla Kutti
- Lalithasree as Maheswari
- Kundara Johny as Police Inspector Narayana Menon
- Bahadoor as Mohammed Musliyar
- Jose as Gopy
- Mohan Jose as Hakkim
- Augustine as Kunjithangal
- Raghavan
- Vincent as Ahammed
- Kaviyoor Ponnamma
- Valsala Menon
- Kunchan as Ananthan Potti
- M. S. Thripunithura as Harinarayanan
- C. I. Paul as Kunjikkoya Thangal
- Kuthiravattam Pappu as Shivankutty
- G. K. Pillai as Khan Bahudoor Chekkotty Sahib
- Sabitha Anand as Ammukutty
- Santha Devi as Beevathu
- Ravi Menon as Chinnanunni
- Shivaji as Ravunni Menon

== Production ==
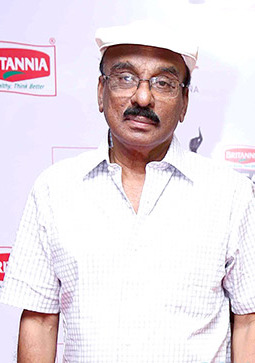
Director I. V. Sasi

=== Development ===
The screenplay was written by physical education teacher-turned-scriptwriter T. Damodaran. Damodaran had particular focus on writing political dramas, and had collaborated with Sasi in several successful films previously. The film was produced by Muhammed Mannil. Peter Narakkal was the Production Executive. The film's budget was ₹12 million (US$120,000). T. Damodaran called the film his "dream project". Ranjini was approached by Sasi for a role, but due to date clashes she could not sign the film. T. Damodaran in an interview with India Today in 1988 said that: "A few years back history could have been told as it was in Malayalam cinema but today I have to weave an actual incident in masala form with a larger than life character for the sake of Mammootty."

=== Crew ===
Anil worked as the associate director for the film. Jomon, M. A. Venugopal and Shajoon Kariyal were the assistant directors while M. Sankar oversaw "Action", K. Narayanan was the editor, V. Jayaram was the cinematographer. Sasi "T. V." Mohan was the Production Designer while I. V. Satheesh Babu was the Art director. The set was done by B. R. Rangan and Narayanan. M. O. Devasia did the Makeup, M. M. Kumar was the costumer. Recording and re-recording were carried out by Selvaraj. G. Rajan.

== Release ==
The film was publicised by "Gayathri" and was distributed by Mannil Films.

=== Critical response ===
"The top dream merchants of the industry see to it that the characters are created according to the diktats of these superstars [Mammootty and Mohanlal]...even history has been tinged with an overdose of fantasy to suit the image of Mammootty [in the film 1921]," film critic Sreedhar Pillai wrote in India Today.

"1921 was shot on a wide canvas with hundreds of actors and required to be dealt with sensitively considering the communal passions that the event evinces in Malabar", wrote the Times of India in 2017. In a 2017 The Times of India article, it was written that 1921 "perhaps, remain his [Sasi's] best cinematic work".

"It [the film] deals with a contentious chapter of our [Indian] Independence struggle, but does it in grand style and high drama. It is also one film that does justice to history. Its representation of the region [South Malabar], the milieu and the historic incident [1921 Uprising] became all the more politically relevant and socially resonant in the next decades [1990s and 2000s] when the [Malayalam] movie images of minorities [Muslims] became biased and parochial.", wrote C. S. Venkiteswaran in The Hindu in 2017.

=== Box office ===
The film was a commercial success and collected over ₹ 2 crore from the box office and emerged one of the top grossers of the year. However, the film was not very profitable for the producers of the film due to its high production costs.

== Accolades ==
The film won:

- Kerala State Film Award for Best Film with Popular Appeal and Aesthetic Value in 1988.
- The film received Filmfare Award for Best Film - Malayalam won by Mohammad Mannil (1988)

== Soundtrack ==
The soundtrack was composed by Shyam. The lyrics of the songs in the film were adapted from folklore Malayalam poems by poets such as Moyinkutty Vaidyar (19th century). Independent India's "national song" Vande Mataram, written by Bengali poet Bankim Chandra Chatterjee (1838–1894), is also featured in the film with vocals by K. S. Chithra. Other "playback singers" are Naushad and Vilayil Faseela.

Song	Playback singer	Lyrics
"Manathu Maaran"	Noushad	Moyinkutty Vaidyar
"Dheerasameere Yamunatheere"	K. S. Chithra	traditional poem
"Muthunava Rathnamukham"	Noushad	Moyinkutty Vaidyar
"Firdausil Adukkumpol"	Noushad and Vilayil Fazila	P. Abdul Khader
"Vande Mataram" (Sanskrit)	K. S. Chithra	Bankim Chandra Chatterjee
