= Nellikkuth, Manjeri =

Nellikkuth
- Town
- Location in Kerala, India Nellikkuth (India)
- Coordinates: 11.10°N 76.18°E
- Country: India
- State: Kerala
- District: Malappuram

Government
  - Type: Municipal Council

Area
  - Total: 2.83 km^{2} (1.09 sq mi)

Languages
  - Official: Malayalam, English
- Time zone: UTC+5:30 (IST)
- PIN: 676122
- Telephone code: 0483
- Vehicle registration: KL-10

Nellikuth (also spelled Nellikuthu) is a town in Manjeri Municipality in Malappuram district of Kerala, India. It is situated 8 km west of Manjeri and 16 km north west to the Malappuram, the district headquarters. Administratively, it is a major locality within Payyanad village in the Eranad Taluk and falls under the PIN code 676122, with a branch post office with the name of the village. The village is known for its active political and cultural vibrancy in the Manjeri municipality.

== Etymology ==
The etymology of the word nellikuth is popularly understood to be a compound word derived from two distinct Malayalam words - nellu (നെല്ല്) and kuthu (കുത്ത്). Nellu means unhusked rice and Kuthu means 'to husk, or 'to pound'. In this context, the phrase "Nellu kuthuka" (നെല്ല് കുത്തുക) refers to the traditional, laborious process of de-husking paddy by pounding it, typically with a large wooden or stone mortar (ഉരല്, Ural) and pestle (ഉലക്ക, Ulakka).

Therefore, the name "Nellikuth" is popularly believed to mean "the place where paddy is husked" or "paddy-pounding." This etymology strongly suggests that the village was historically a significant center for paddy cultivation and the subsequent post-harvest processing of rice, which was a cornerstone of the local agrarian economy. This etymological root is largely shared through the oral history of the village.

== History ==
Nellikuth is the birthplace of Ali Musliyar and Variyan Kunnath Kunjahammed Haji, the Moplah rebel leaders of 1921 Malabar Rebellion. This place is 8 km far from manjeri town.

== Geography ==
Nellikuth is located at 11.10°N 76.18°E. Mukkam, Palathingal, Kottakuth is some areas within the village. A part of Kadalundi river flows through the village.

== Culture ==
Nellikkuth village has been a multi-ethnic and multi-religious village since the medieval period. The Muslims form the largest religious group followed by Hindus and Christians. The cultural tradition of the village reflects the folk arts of different communities. Duff Muttu, Kadhaprasangam, Kolkali and Aravanamuttu are common folk arts of this locality. The mosques in Nellikuth also been functioned as madrasa and libraries giving a rich source of Islamic studies. Most of the books are written in Arabi-Malayalam which is a version of the Malayalam language written in Arabic script. The Hindu community of this area keeps rich traditions by celebrating various festivals in temples. Hindu rituals are a regular devotion like other parts of Kerala.

== Transportation ==
The manjeri - melattur road connects the village to nearby areas. The nearest town is Manjeri. The areas are well connected within the villages by municipality roads.

== Civic administration ==
The village is governed by Manjeri municipality. Nellikuth village is composed of three wards.

Ward no.	Name
22	Nellikuth - 1
23	Nellikuth - 2
24	Chalukulam

== Important institutions ==
=== Education ===
The village has a Lower primary school and a senior secondary school including vocational courses. Other than these government-backed schools, some private educational institutions have also been established to cater to the educational needs of the village.

=== Healthcare ===
The government has established local public health care in the village. It houses an ayurvedic dispensary, along with another primary health care centre. There are other private clinics to serve the population.

--Maqdoomiyya Islamic Academy--

It's an integrated Islamic educational institution. It's founded in the memory of well known Islamic scholar marhoom Sheikh ismail musliyar Nellikkuth by Sheikh umarul farooq kamil Saquafi Nellikkuth

== Notable people ==
- Ali Musliyar - Freedom activist.
- Variyan Kunnathu Kunjahammed Haji - Indian Freedom Fighter.
