= Theodore Delves Broughton =

Brigadier Theodore Delves Broughton
- Born: 25 December 1872
- Died: 1 February 1944 (aged 71); Pewsey, Wiltshire
- Military career
- Allegiance: United Kingdom
- Branch: British Army
- Service years: 1891 - 1929
- Rank: Brigadier
- Unit: Royal Engineers
- Conflicts: First World War, Malabar Rebellion

Brigadier Theodore Delves Broughton (25 December 1872 – 1 February 1944) was a senior British Army officer.

== Biography ==
Born on 25 December 1872, Theodore Delves Broughton was educated at Bedford School. He served during the First World War, between 1914 and 1918, fighting in Mesopotamia and Persia. He served during the Malabar Rebellion, between 1921 and 1922, and was Chief Engineer of India, between 1925 and 1929 with the appointment of colonel-commandant (brigadier from 1928).

Broughton died in Pewsey, Wiltshire, on 1 February 1944.
