= Battle of Pookkottur =

Part of the Malabar rebellion (1921)

- Part of Malabar rebellion
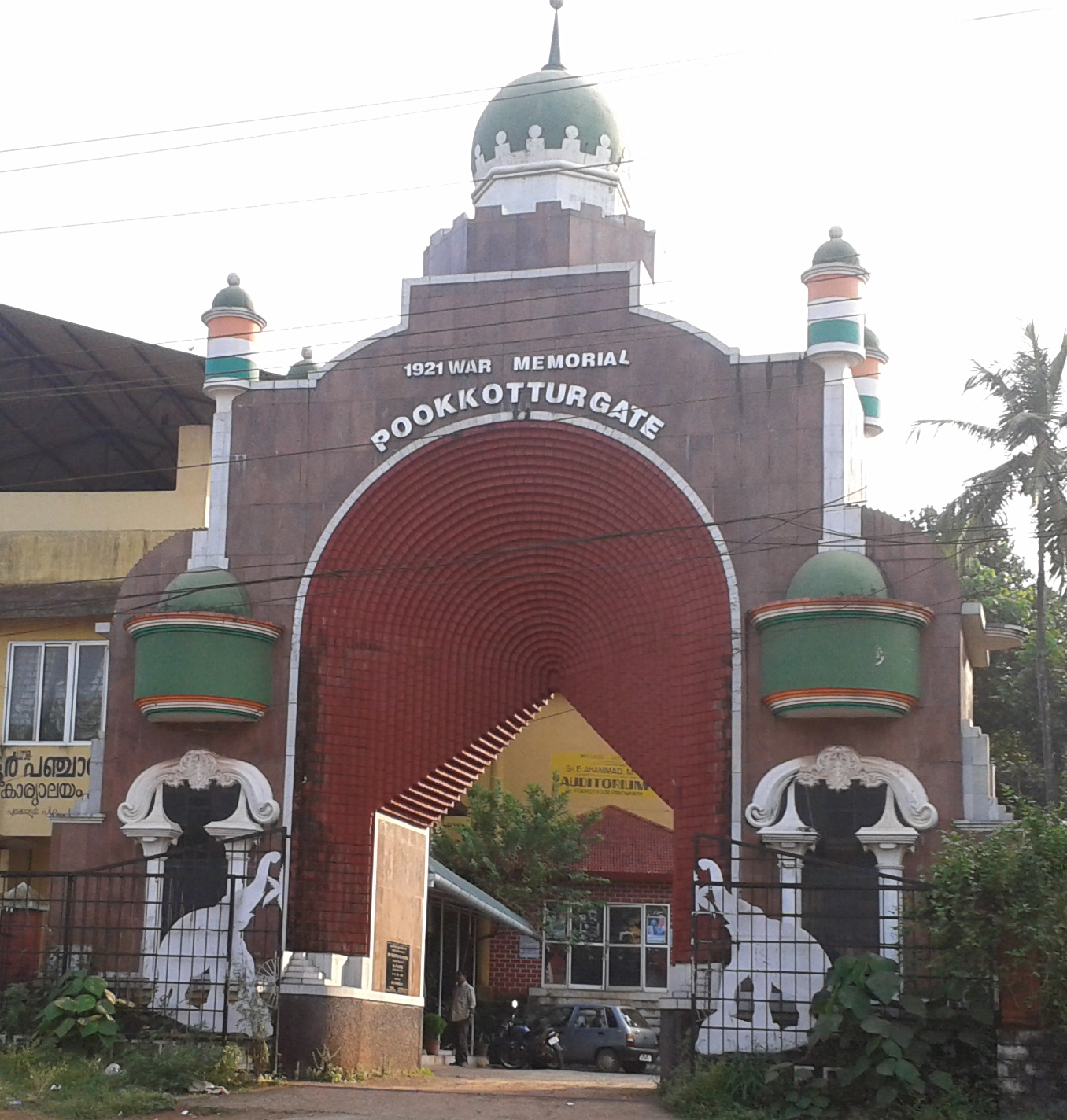
- Masjid built for the memorial of the Battle
Date	August 26, 1921
Location	Pookkottur 11°5′50″N 76°3′50″E
Result	Mappila victory

Belligerents
Mappila rebels	British Army

Commanders and leaders
Vadakke veettil Muhammad †	Cuthbert Buxton Lancaster; Captain P McEnroy †
- Location within Kerala Battle of Pookkottur (India)

The Battle of Pookkottur was a battle that the Mappilas of Malabar fought against the British army during anti-colonial struggles in the Malabar province of Northern Kerala, India. The battle took place on 26 August 1921 at Pookkottur in Malappuram district. The Indian forces were led by Vadakkuveettil Mohammed, the Secretary of the Khilafat Committee in the Malabar region. He led the force of Variyankunnath Kunjahammad Haji, while Cuthbert Buxton Lancaster and Captain P. McEnroy led the British force. The battle played an important role in the Malabar rebellion.

== Background ==
The Khilafat movement was popular in Pookkottur. After the outbreak of the Malabar rebellion in 1921, the British army and police were forced to retreat. A group of British officials stuck in Malabar, including District Magistrate Austin, called for rescue. The British forces left Kozhikkode for Pookkottur in 22 lorries and 25 cycles under Captain McEnroy and Superintendent of Police Malappuram CB Lancaster. This information reached Kunjahammed Haji, a rebel leader, and he discussed the matter with Pookkottur leaders including Mammad and Kunji Thangal, and decided to attack the British army at Pookkottur.

== Battle ==
On the morning of August 21, the rebels reached Pookkottur. Their plan was to let the British lorries continue until they reached Pilakkal and then ambush them from all sides.

However, Parancheri Kunjarammutty. who was not present in the final meeting of the rebels did not know of this plan. He was concealed behind a heap of soil and opened fire at the first lorry while only two or three lorries had arrived.

Hearing the gunshots, the British reversed the lorries and threw smoke bombs. Due to the smoke, the rebels were unable to aim properly. Despite this, they inflicted numerous casualties. Under the cover of smoke, the British fired their machine guns.

When the smoke dissipated, about ten soldiers walked towards Pilakkal under the guise of a surrender, which lured the rebels to come forward to capture them. The soldiers retreated and opened fire with machine guns, killing numerous rebels.

Kunjarammutty, who at first opened fire with other rebels, charged the army with swords once they ran out of ammunition. Mammad was killed in the ensuing battle. The battle lasted for almost 3 hours, and 400 on the rebel side and 4 on the British side were officially listed as casualties. However, eyewitness A. Muhammed in his book Swathandrasmaranakal, said that he had seen two lorries going to Westhill, Kozhikode carrying many dead bodies and injured soldiers.

After the battle, the army was on the way to Malappuram with Lancaster with four soldiers in a lorry in the front. At Kummalippadi, Mappila rebel Mankara Thodiyil Kunjahmmed climbed a tree and threw a grenade into the lorry, killing Lancaster and several soldiers.
