= Kottakkunnu =

Hill station in Kerala, India

Kottakkunnu Kottakkunnu Hill Station
- Hill station
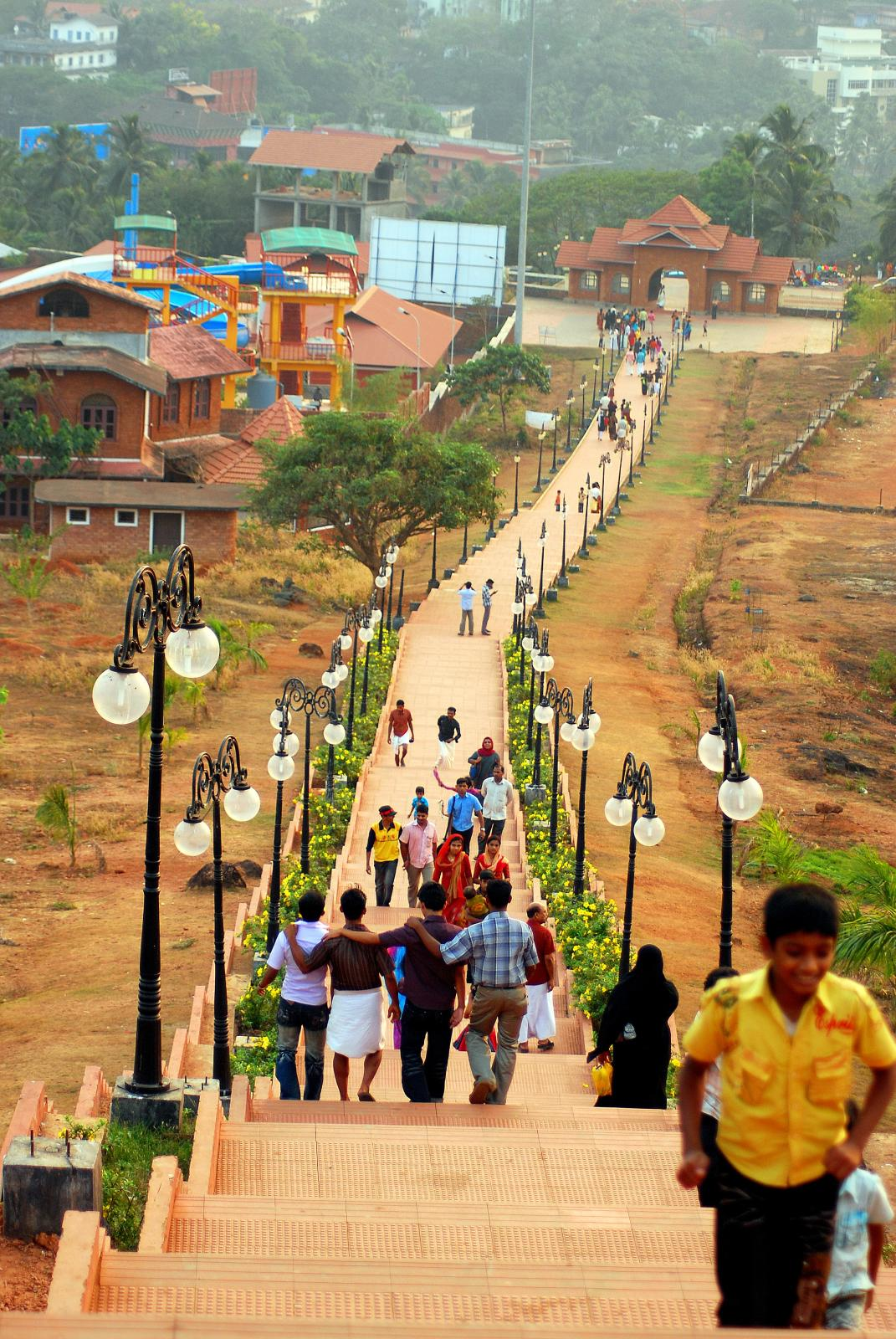
- Kottakunnu

- location in Kerala, India Kottakkunnu (India) Kottakkunnu (Asia) Kottakkunnu (Earth)
- Coordinates: 11.048°N 76.083°E
- Country: India
- State: Kerala
- District: Malappuram

Languages
- Time zone: UTC+5:30 (IST)

Kottakkunnu is a hill station in Malappuram district of Kerala state, India. Widely known as Kotta Kunnu, it is situated at a height of 120 metres and is a popular tourist destination in the state of Kerala located at Malappuram.

== History ==
The name Kottakunnu comes from the fort built here when the area was the military headquarters of the Calicut rulers Zamorins . Due to the geographical importance of this area, the fort known as Malappuram Fort was built here and the city of Malappuram came up. These areas became part of Valluvanad after the Perumal rule of the Chera kingdom that ruled Kerala in ancient times. At the end of a mountain, the place is a strategic area that is three parts river, one part deep gorge and the upper part is flat like a pedestal. The modern city is spread over the slope of this hill and the plains below.

== Kottapadi ==
Varakkal Paranabisan, who conquered Malappuram and the surrounding area from Valluvakonathiri, built a fort on top of Kottakunnu. The gates of the fort are the places known today as the commercial center Kottapadi (Fortgate) at Downhill and Moonampadi ( Third gate) on the Nilambur road. Paranambi ruled Ernad with Kottapadi as the headquarters and continued military operations against Valluvanadu and other kingdoms with Kottakkunnu fort as the military center. After the Zamorins conquered the part of the Kadalundi river where the Cherupuzha joins, it became necessary to pay taxes in Malappuram to bring the goods from the Valluvanadu to the Sea port or forced to sell to the traders of Calicut which resulted formation of small trade center in the area called Kootilangadi. During the staring of 18th century the Paranambi of the time was defeated in a battle with Puntrakonathiri, the ruler of Kottakkal, and was captured by the enemy soldiers. The Moplah Muslim traders fought them and released Paranambi. Pleased with this, Paranambi built the famous Jama mosque near the Kadalundi river and a commercial center developed around the mosque known as Valiyangadi. With this, in the early 1700s, Malappuram became a commercial center beyond being a military center.

== Hill Station ==
The beautiful view from the top of the Malappuram hill and the gentle breeze made the area a British military base. Some British documents refer to Malappuram hill as one of the most beautiful military bases in India. Malappuram was also known as the last military center of the British Empire in the southern part of India at that time. Malappuram fort was demolished and a gunnery training center was built there. In the 1800s, the anti-British rebellions in South Malabar, known as the Moplah Rebellions, led to the establishment of several military bases in and around Malappuram. A paramilitary unit called Malappuram Special Police was established in Malappuram in 1885. During the Malabar uprising against British empire in 1921, it was raised as the Malabar Special Police. During the Malabar War of 1921, several British military units such as the Leinster Regiment and the Dorset Regiment were encamped in Malappuram. The Leinster Regiment, a military unit of Southern Ireland was the last military alliance with the British soldiers at Malappuram in 1921. After that, Southern Ireland became an independent republic from Britain.

== Variyankunnath Kunjahmad Haji Memorial Town hall ==
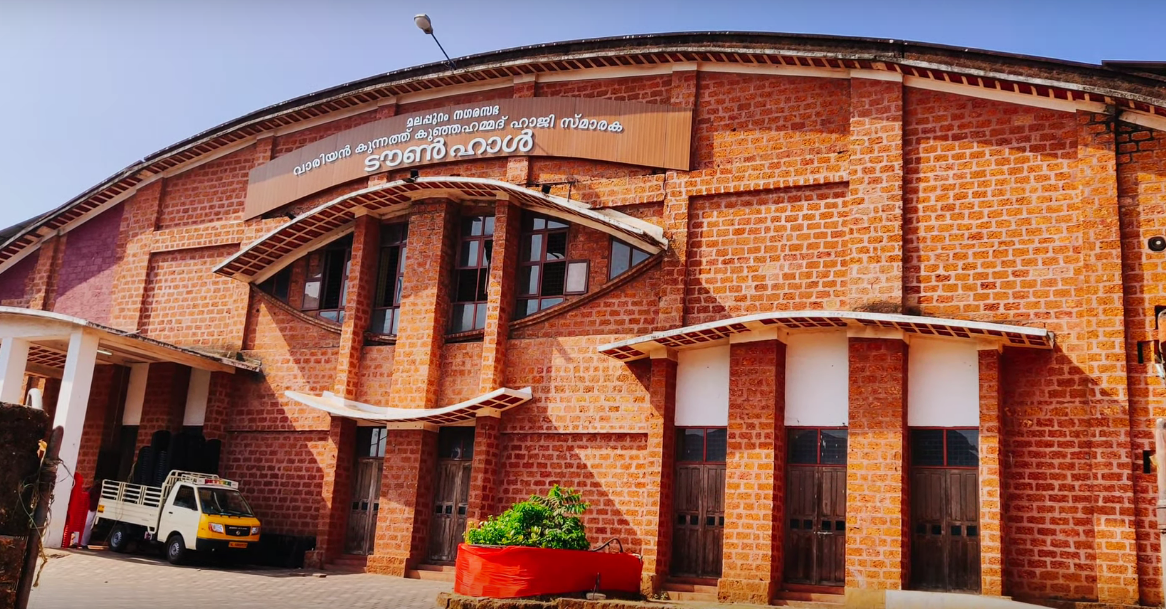
Variyankunnath Kunjahammad Haji Memorial Town Hall

Variyankunnath Kunjahmad Haji Memorial Town Hall is the historic town hall, located in Kottakunnu During British rule, a military court was established at Kottakunnu and many freedom fighters were tried and executed. Variyankunnath Kunjahammad Haji, British rebel ruler during Malabar uprising, and his two assistants were tried and shot dead by the British court on the afternoon of January 20, 1922, on the northern slopes of Kottakunnu. It was there that his body and the documents of the British rebel state he established as the Malayalam Rajyam were burnt. Now Malappuram Municipality has built a town hall in his memory below Kottakunnu.

== Military Headquarters in 1947 ==
After British rule in 1947, many British military bases including Kotakunnu in Malappuram came under the Department of Defence under Central Ministry of India . The main military headquarters is the present District Collectorate of Malappuram . Apart from the Malabar Special Police, a paramilitary force under the Kerala Police, other military centers were abolished. In 1956, when Malabar, which was a part of Madras State, was annexed to Kerala State, a section of Malabar Special Police was transferred to Tamil Nadu under the name of Madras Special Police.

== Events in Kottakkunnu ==
On May 17, 1998, the Kudumbasree mission, a women's empowerment scheme of the Government of Kerala, was inaugurated by the Prime Minister Atal Bihari Vajpayee at Kottakunnu.

On August 9, 2019, three people, including a child, died in a landslide in Kottakunnu due to heavy rain.

== Major attractions ==
Today many entertainment centers like art gallery, amusement park, children's park etc... have been built there.

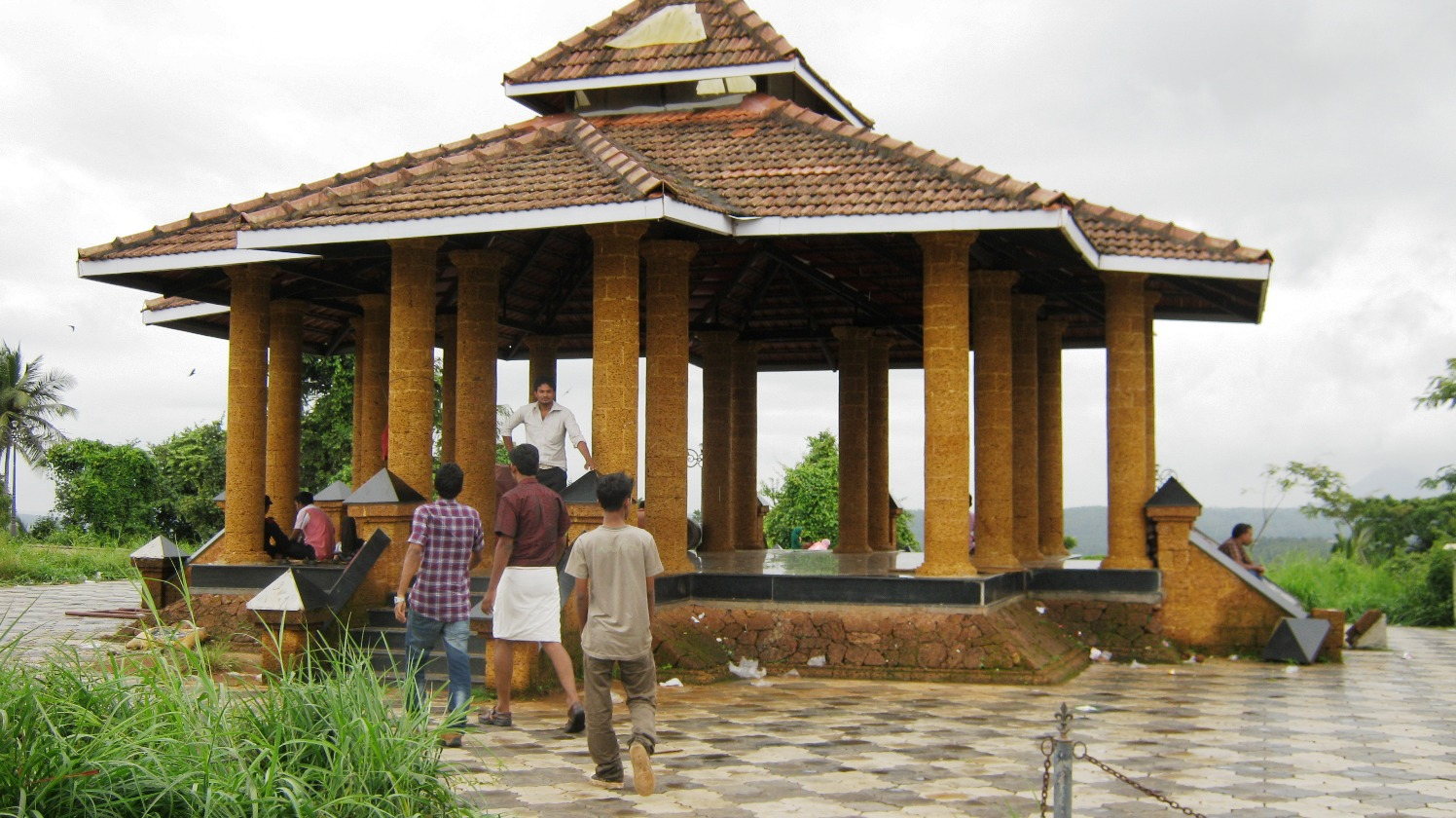
Kottakunnu hill station

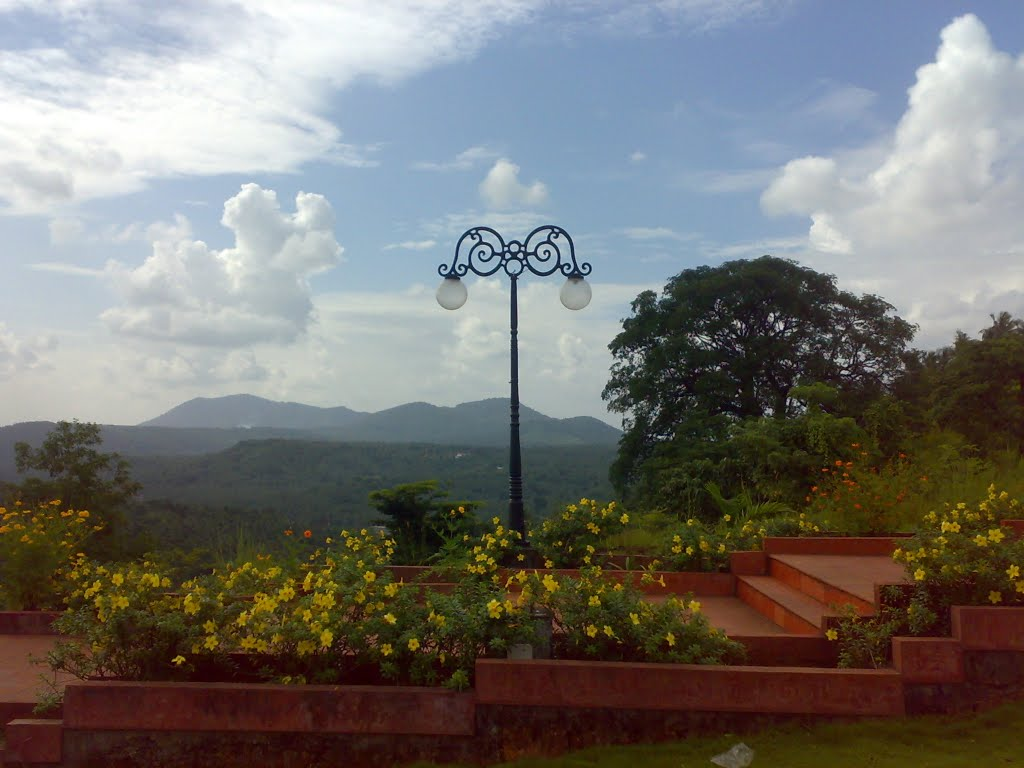
Hill Garden

- Hill Garden
- Amusement Park
- hill station
