= Ali Musliyar =

Indian Islamic religious leader (1862–1922)

Āli Musliyār
- ആലി മുസ്‌ലിയാർ
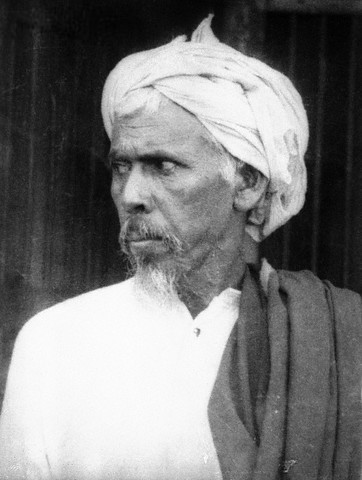
- Ali Musliyar in 1922, at Coimbatore Central Jail
- Title: Musliyar

Personal life
- Born: Erikkunnan Pālattu Mūlayil Āli; 1862 Nellikuth, Madras Presidency, British India
- Died: 21 February 1922 (aged 60–61) Coimbatore, Madras Presidency, British India
- Cause of death: Execution by hanging

Religious life
- Religion: Islam
- Creed: Sufi
- Movement: Khilafat Movement; Malabar rebellion

Muslim leader
- Based in: British India
- Post: Mampuram Mosque
- Period in office: 1907–1922

Āli Musliyār (born Erikkunnan Pālattu Mūlayil Āli; 1862 – 21 February 1922) was an Indian Islamic religious leader who was the spiritual leader of the 1921–1922 Malabar rebellion. Prior to the Malabar rebellion, he was imam of Mampuram Mosque from 1907. He was also a leading member of the Khilafat Movement.

== Early life ==
Āli Musliyār was born in Nellikuth, Malabar District to Kunhimoitīn Molla and Kōtakkal Āmina. Kōtakkal Āmina was a member of the famous Maqdoom family of Ponnani, known for their radical Islamist sect of religious law. Musliyar's grandfather, Mūsa, was one of several "Malappuram Martyrs". Ali Musliyar began his education studying the Quran, tajwīd and the Malayalam language with Kakkadammal Kunnukammu Molla. He was sent to Ponnani Darse for further studies in religion and philosophy, under the tutelage of Sheikh Zainuddin Makhdoom I, which he successfully completed after ten years.

He then went to Mecca for further education. Throughout this period, he was guided by several famous scholars, including Sayyid Ahmed Sahni Dahlan, Shiekh Muhammed Hisbullahi Makki, and Sayyid Husain Habshi. After spending seven years in Mecca, he went on to serve as the Chief qasi of Kavaratti, in the Laccadive Islands. In 1907 he was appointed as chief musliyar of Mampuram Mosque.

Ali Musliyar was a member of the Indian National Congress, and supported Islamic modernism and anti-colonialism. He was one of the leaders of the Khilafat Movement.

== Malabar rebellion ==
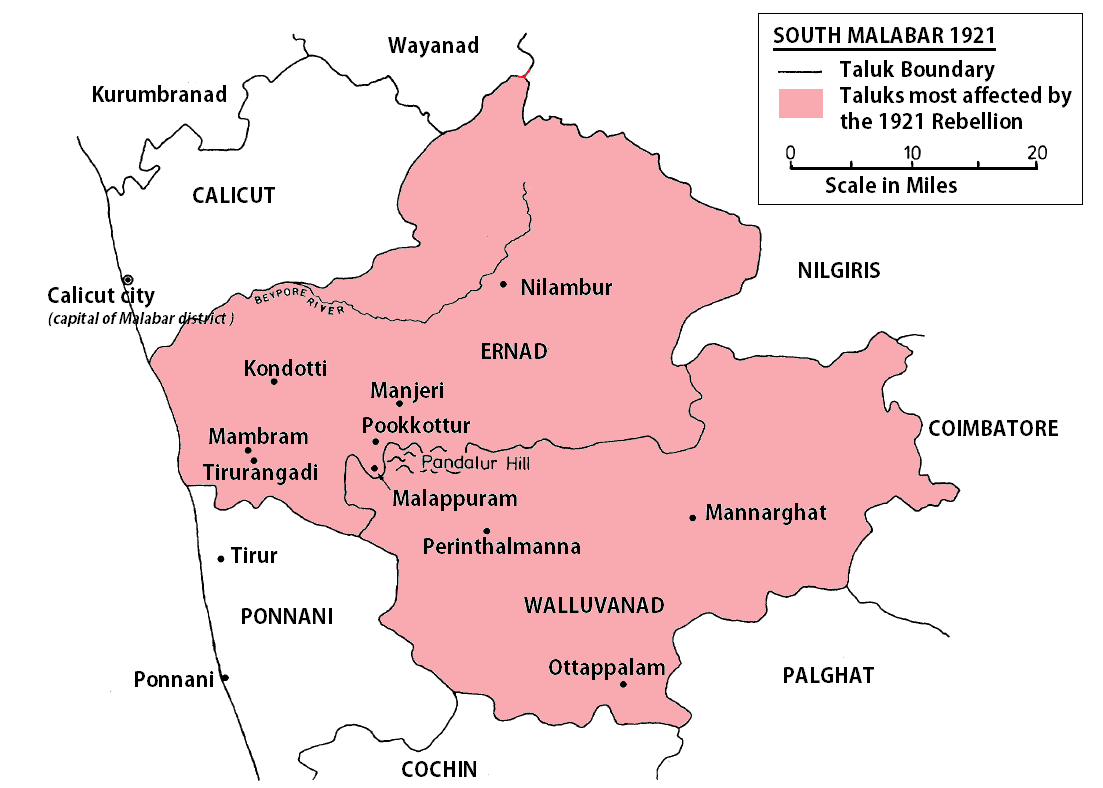
Taluks that came under rebel control during the Malabar Rebellion in Malabar (present-day Kerala) in 1921

The defeat of the Ottoman Empire in World War I had a significant impact in heavily-Muslim Malabar, which had been prone to anti-colonial unrest since the early 19th century. Ali Musliyar formed an association of landless farmers and labourers in 1920, known as the Kudiyan Sangham. This group primarily protested against upper-caste Namboodiri brahmin landlords, who had secured agreements with the British on land ownership and evictions.

By June 1921, the Khilafat Movement had become integrated with the non-cooperation movement; the Khilafat leaders, Ali Musliyar among them, were increasingly active in anti-British protests, and Khilafat Movement activists were increasingly militant, regularly appearing as counter-protesters at demonstrations against the non-cooperation movement. That year, Malabar Muslims declared independence from British India, forming an independent state known as the Malayalam Kingdom. Led by Variyankunnath Kunjahammad Haji, the state adopted its own passport, currency and taxation system. This marked the beginning of the Malabar rebellion.

Following the beginning of the rebellion, rumours soon spread among Mappilas that British soldiers had destroyed the Mamparam mosque. As a result, widespread violence against the British, as well as wealthy Hindus, broke out. Though colonial troops soon gained the upper hand, the rebellion continued as a guerilla war. This led to additional deployments of British troops, and what historian Spencer C. Tucker refers to as "aggressive" patrolling. The revolt eventually came to an end in February 1922, after more than 1,000 and as many as over 10,000 Muslims were killed. Ali Musliyar was among the dozen leaders of the rebellion who were arrested; he was sentenced to death and executed by hanging at Coimbatore prison on 21 February 1922.

== Dictionary of Martyrs controversy ==
Ali Musliyar's name was listed in the fifth volume of Dictionary of Martyrs: India's Freedom Struggle from 1857 to 1947. The inclusion of the Malabar rebellion's participants sparked controversy, with Sangh Parivar Hindutva groups protesting their inclusion. A digital copy of the book was later withdrawn from the website of the Ministry of Culture of India. Opponents of the Malabar rebels' inclusion have argued that their association with the Khilafat Movement makes them Islamic, rather than Indian martyrs; CI Isaac, a member of the Rashtriya Swayamsevak Sangh and the Indian Council of Historical Research, said in 2021 that "The leadership was not for the cause of the country but for the religion. There were sharia courts, conversions and killings of Hindus. This cannot be considered for the dictionary of martyrs." Following the controversy, a three-member committee of ICHR members, including Isaac, publicly considered removing the Malabar rebels from the book.

Efforts to remove the Malabar rebels themselves became a source of backlash; member of parliament E. T. Mohammed Basheer described efforts to remove their names as "threatening and reprehensible", while multiple scholars who had worked with the ICHR resisted allegations that the rebellion had been anti-Hindu in nature, as well as claims that rebels had engaged in forced conversions of Hindus.
