= Variyankunnath Kunjahammad Haji =

Leader of the Malabar rebellion

- Born: 1875–1877; Nellikkuth, Manjeri Malabar District, Madras Presidency, British Raj (present-day Kerala, India)
- Died: 20 January 1922, Kottakkunnu, Malappuram, Malabar District, Madras Presidency, British Raj (present-day Kerala, India)
- Cause of death: Execution by shooting
- Resting place: His body was cremated by the British. Information about the ash is unknown.
- Monuments: Varian Kunnath Kunjahammad Haji Memorial Town Hall, Malappuram
- Other names: Variamkunnan, Variyamkunnath
- Occupation: Business
- Organization: Khilafat Movement
- Known for: Malabar rebellion; Khilafat Movement; Indian independence movement; Battles in Malabar; Parallel government; Guerilla warfare; Battle of Pandikkad; Battle of Pookottur; Battle of Areekode; Manjeri proclamation; Nilambur proclamation; Punishing rioters; Thekkekalam meeting; Opposition against Jenmi system
- Style: Revolutionary
- Movement: Khilafat Movement; Agrarian revolution; Anti-colonial struggle
- Spouses: Ummakiya (m. 1905, Death) Sainaba (m. 1908, Death): Malu Hajjumma (Paravetti Fathima) [Malu's marriage with Variankunnath Kunjahammed Haji was in 1919 or 1920 and death in 1961 (aged 82)]
- Children: 5 children. With first wife Ummakiya: Mahmood, Moideenkutty, Fathima, Ayishakutty. With second wife Sainaba: Muhammad
- Parents: Variyamkunnath Moitheenkutty Haji (father); Paravetty Kunjaisha Hajjumma (mother)
- Relatives: Elder brother Kunjalan Kutty (died in childhood). Other siblings: Moideen Haji, Fathima, Kunjayisha, Mariyam Hajjuma, Amina Hajjuma, Unneema
- Family: Chakkipparamban family
- Honours: Listed his name in Dictionary of Martyrs: India's Freedom Struggle (1857–1947) Vol. 5

Notes
- The first part of his name Variyan Kunnath (Malayalam: വാരിയൻ കുന്നത്ത്) has been written differently in different sources such as Variamkunnath or Variyamkunnath or Variyankunnath or Variyan Kunnathu and the second part Kunjahammad (Malayalam: കുഞ്ഞഹമ്മദ്) as Kunhamad (Malayalam: കുഞ്ഞമ്മദ്) or Kunhahamed (Malayalam: കുഞ്ഞഹമ്മദ്)

Variyankunnath Kunjahammad Haji sometimes called Variyamkunnan (1875–1877 – 20 January 1922) was a prominent leader during the war in Malabar against the British, during the Malabar rebellion, and the founder of a parallel government. He was an Indian freedom fighter, opposer of the Jenmi system, and an ordinary member of the Khilafat movement.

According to R. H. Hitchcock, who took part in the fight against the rebellion, "Khilafat to him (Variyankunnath Kunjahammad Haji) was a Turkish matter, not Indian." Variyankunnath Kunjahammad Haji was just a member of the Khilafat Movement. He established a parallel government in the Malabar District of Madras Presidency in open defiance of the British Raj, which lasted for a short period of six months. With his long-term mentor, Ali Musliyar, Kunjahammed Haji seized large areas of the then Eranad and Valluvanad taluks, now part of Kerala state in India, from British control. He said he was fighting for the independence of India.

== In Dictionary of Martyrs: India's Freedom Struggle (1857–1947) ==
His name is listed in the fifth volume of The Dictionary of Martyrs, India's Freedom Struggle from 1857 to 1947.

However, under the Modi government, the Indian Council of Historical Research considered removing the names of Haji and 386 others from the Dictionary of Martyrs of India's Freedom Struggle for being associated with the Khilafat Movement. However, it has not been removed since.

== Message to Friends of Freedom for India ==
On 7 December 1921 two American newspapers, Detroit Free Press and The Baltimore Sun, reported the message received by the Friends of Freedom for India from Variyankunnath Kunjahammad Haji in a cablegram. In these two American newspaper reports the message was preceded by the following sentence: "Charges that the Moplahs of Malabar have put to death many Hindus and forcibly converted others to Mohammedanism were denied and characterized as part of a British plot to discredit the Moplah movement of India's independence in a cablegram from Variamkunnath Kunhamed Haji ..."

The report which contains the message of Variyankunnath Kunjahammad Haji follows as:

"A few cases of conversion of our Hindu brethren have been reported to me." the message said. "But after proper investigation we discovered the real plot. The vandals that were guilty of this crime were members of the British reserve police and British intelligence department, and they joined our forces as patriots to do such filthy work only to discredit our soldiers. There are Christians, Hindus and Moplahs amongst these British agents and spies. They have decidedly been put to death. (Note: "7 Dec 1921, 6 - The Baltimore Sun at Newspapers.com". Newspapers.com. 7 December 1921. p. 6. The last sentence of the news report about the cablegram from Variamkunnath Kunjahammad Haji reported by The Baltimore Sun is, "They have deservedly been put to death." But in the same report by Detroit Free Press the word "decidedly" was used in the same sentence: "They have decidedly been put to death." Detroit Free Press reported further part of the massage in the cablegram.)

"We are at war with England. We are fighting for the independence of India, and we are doing exactly what the Americans did to free America from British domination. So anyone giving aid and comfort to the enemy will be se verely dealt with, irrespective of social position or religious affiliation.

"Let the great people of the great land of Washington postpone judgment until they have a chance to know the full truth about the present war in Malabar."

== Early life ==
Haji was born in a Muslim family in Nellikkuth, which is five miles far from Manjeri. He was the second child of his parents, Chakkiparamban Moideenkutty Haji and Kunjaisha Hajjumma. Moideenkutty Haji was a merchant, farmer, and local leader. He was imprisoned in Andaman for taking part in the 1894 Mannarkkad Rebellion.

He pursued his basic religious education from village Madrasa, later upgraded as 'Ezhuthukalari' where Malayalam language was also part of curriculam. He studied many Arabic texts from Mammad Kutty Musliyar. After his father was deported to Andaman, Haji was brought up in his mother's family. His grandfather was also a local leader, he appointed a teacher named Balakrishnan Ezhuthachan, from whom he learnt Malayalam and basic English along with other grandchildren of his grandfather. He was also trained in martial arts along with his primary education.

Haji could also be seen as the one who was very passionate of traditional mappila art forms, he used to conduct Kolkkali, Daffumutt, and Katha Prasangam. It is also said that he was a good singer too. The acceptance he acquired through performing arts soon made him popular in community. The deportation of his father and other rebels and the seizure of their lands and properties followed, triggered his anger and hostility towards British.

== Marriages ==
Haji returned from Mecca in 1905 and married Ruqiyya, the daughter of Unni Muhammed. After her death in 1908, he married Sainaba, the sister of one of his friends. In 1920 Haji married his cousin Malu Hajjumma (Paravetti Fathima), the daughter of his uncle Koyammu Haji. They were brought up in the same home and this was the third marriage for both of them. Malu had an important role in Haji's life.

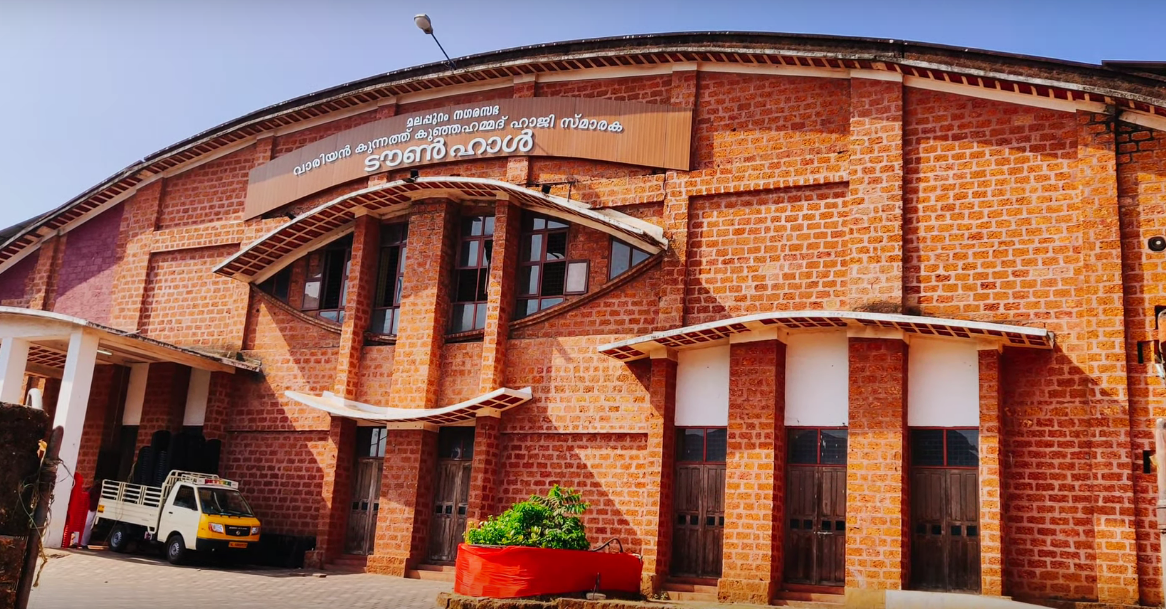
Variyan Kunnath Kunjahammad Haji Memorial Municipal Town Hall, Malappuram

== Activism before rebellion ==
=== Manjeri armed struggle ===
In 1896, many kudiyans (tenants) became landless in Chembrassery in one day from the land that was under the people of the Manjeri kovilakam through eviction. Hundreds of those who objected this eviction took control of assets associated with the Manjeri kovilakam. These people fought against the British that came to help the kovilakam. Variamkunnath Kunjahammad Haji played a leadership role in this fight. It was the first battle that he participated. Then he was 20 years old. 94 people got killed on the objectors' side. The British force left mistaking all the objectors were killed. But some did not die. Variamkunnath Kunnahammad Haji was one of those who did not get killed.

=== Self-imposed exile ===
Knowing he has not been killed in the Manjeri armed struggle, Inspector Anakayam Chekkutty tried to charge him in the case. But he was saved by some help.

Around 1899, Inspector Chekkutty decided to arrest Variamkunnath Kunjahammad Haji anyway to exile. So some decided to send Haji to Mecca in the name of Hajj to solve the problem. Some forced him to flee to evade arrest. So he exiled himself for the first time. And he spent five years in Mecca.

He went to Bombay and learned Urdu, Hindi and English and conducted business there. Next year he went to Mecca and performed Hajj. In 1905 he returned to Malabar.

He made few more trips to Mecca later. He came to Malabar after his last trip to Mecca, in 1914.

== Other background events ==
=== Malabar Kudiyan Sangham ===
M. P. Narayana Menon formed Malabar Kudiyan Sangham in 1920. M. P. Narayana Menon merged 'Kudiyan Sankadanivarana Sangham', a body he had formed to redress the grievances of kudiyans and whose activities were joined with those of the Congress, into the newly formed Malabar Kudiyan Sangham. Many branches were formed in different taluks. Because of these kudiyan movements, Mappilas and lower caste people became attracted to the Congress.

=== Congress conference at Manjeri ===
The fifth Malabar District Political conference was held at Manjeri 28–29 April 1920. The Manjeri Congress conference held 28–29 April 1920 was a huge victory for Mappilas, lower caste people and peasants. In this conference a motion supporting, non-violent non-cooperation in case the British government decides Khilafat question contrary to the Muslims' request and faith, was passed with a huge majority. Annie Basant had said though the British is wrong in the matter of Khilafat, non-cooperation is not right. The second motion supporting the Montagu–Chelmsford Reforms which Annie Basant presented got defeated through voting with a huge majority. Annie Basant walked out of the conference. Later, she resigned from the Congress. The third one was the most revolutionary. The third motion was for the relief of peasants and reform in law related to land. That too was passed with a great majority. It was the first day people saw the voice of the poor peasants get a victory in a Congress conference.

=== Discontent of Jenmis and chiefs ===
With the Manjeri Congress Conference, Jenmis and chiefs almost lost interest in freedom. What seen next was Nilambur Thamburam and the like who organised the Manjeri Congress Conference turning against the Khilafat-Non-cooperation movement. M. P. Narayana Menon says Jenmis and prominent Congress leaders in Malabar expressed concern about this organised activity of Mappilas.

=== Spread of Congress ===
With the Manjeri Congress Conference, Congress got established in Eranad. This conference helped the activities of the Congress to spread to the rural areas of Malabar.

=== Congress and Khilafat Movement ===
Gandhiji was invited to the Delhi Khilafat Conference in April 1919. In that conference, Gandhi declared the full support of the Congress to the Khilafat Movement.

=== Non-cooperation movement ===
The non-cooperation movement spread like a wildfire in Malabar with the coming of Mahatma Gandhi and Moulana Shoukathali as part of the Khilafat-Congress non-cooperation movement in Kozhikode. On 20 August 1920 both of them got a huge reception at the Kozhikode beach.

=== Ali Musliyar and protest ===
After the conference, Ali Musliyar was asked to join the movement. Though he was not ready at first he agreed to co-operate. He became the vice president of the Thirurangadi Khilafat committee. With his entrance to the protest, Congress-Khilafat committees were formed all over Malabar. M. P. Narayana Menon's Kudiyan Sanghams merged into Khilafat committees. Soon Congress-Khilafat committees in Malabar became more strengthened as compared to other districts in Madras Presidency. Many resigned their jobs. Advocates left courts. Several removed titles given by the British. Courts and schools were boycotted. Anyway the Khilafat-Congress non-cooperation struggle grew as a threat to the authority.

=== Crackdown on protest ===
At the time the collector of Malabar was E. F. Thomas. What the Hitchcock-Thomas group did on 5 February 1921 was to ban meetings in Eranad and Valluvanad, and speeches by certain people (inuding Variamkunnath Kunjahammad Haji). Consequently, four arrests were made when Congress-Khilafat leader Yakoob Hasan came to Kozhikode. To protest against this move, protests, including meetings and hartals, were organized in several places. But the protest in Thrissur became a problem.

=== Hindu-Muslim unity before war ===
==== Problem in Thrissur ====
===== Protest after arrests =====
Protests began due to the arrest of four people after Congress-Khilafat leader Yakoob Hasan came to Kozhikode on 15 February 1921. But the protest became a problem in Thrissur. A Christian priest and his followers unleashed violence against this protest in Thrissur. Thus the table and chairs on the stage were set on fire. And an atmosphere of terror was created in Thrissur with the help of the police (Superintendent Chako played the leadership role in it). But Congress-Khilafat workers organised another meeting against this on 26 February 1921.

===== Loyalty procession =====
On 27 February 1921 a loyalty procession by 1500 people with the help of the Government started. They attacked mosques, Mappila houses, houses belonging to lower caste Hindus, and their shops. Tired, Mappilas counter-attacked. One was killed and forty people injured.

=== Hindu-Muslim unity and victory procession ===
To counter the attacks unleashed in the loyalty procession, Congress, under the leadership of Thrissur Congress leader Dr. A. R. Menon, sought the help of Mappilas of Eranad. Thus 2000 Mappilas under the leadership of Vadakkuveettil Mammad reached Thrissur by train. There were Hindu TTRs who did not ask train tickets from these Mappilas. These Mappilas took out a march shaking Thrissur town on 2 March 1921. Seeing the serious situation, Divan and President reached the place and invited people from both sides and the problem was solved. As a result, Hindus and Muslims made a victory procession.

=== British divide and rule policy before war ===
==== Divide and rule policy ====
The trick used by the British to divide and rule was to constantly target one group from the people. This trick would be much to make a divide among them.

==== Undeclared police raj ====
Mappilas had taken out a march of 2000 people in Thrissur on 2 March 1921, followed by a victory procession by Hindus and Muslims. The police in Malabar began to threaten the Khilafat volunteers and leaders in a particular manner in important centres and, to visit the prominent people loyal to the British and receive food and others from there, each day. By 15 March 1921 an undeclared police raj came into effect. The Mappilas began to be charged with cases and arrested in a huge number. So many false cases were charged against them such as theft and rape. Even a funny charge of stealing a pen, that too by two persons, was made against Mappilas. There was an instance of charging a case and registering arrest even for going to the police station wearing a Khilafat cap. These were reported in the British newspaper Madras Daily, newspapers Mithavadi, The Muslim, and Jenmis' newspapers, Kerala Pathrika, Yogakshemam. All were false cases. Many were arrested in such false cases. All those arrested were cruelly tortured.

==== Declared police raj ====
By the end of May, with canes, guns and spears on the guns, a declared police raj came into effect under the Hichkock-Thomas-Amu leadership. Cruel torture became a continuous story. Even the house and household of Mappilas were attacked.

==== Destruction of Hindu-Muslim unity ====
Because several cases were of stealing things of high caste Hindus, Mappilas began to hate them. Lower caste people isolated themselves from Muslims who are constantly being targeted, due to fear. Cracks began to appear in the unity created by Congress-Khilafat committees. The Kudiyan collective and the Khilafat collective began to collapse. People working under Jenmis began to be tortured more than earlier. The condition of workers of Eaton, the manager of Kerala estate, was worse than that of the cattle. Congress leaders except M. P. Narayana Menon apparently abandoned Mappilas.

=== Varnashrama system of Congress organisational structure and abandoning of Khilafat members ===
Knap, the Special Commission, came to Kozhikode on 14 August 1921. Knap gave permission to search for weapons in houses of some places. Thomas' order to relocate families of the British officers to Kozhikode made doubt among people. They understood all Mappilas, their houses and relatives are going to be attacked for no reason. Congress leaders cruelly abandoned Khilafat movement members in this turbulent time. A handful of persons including M. P. Narayana Menon, Kattilasseri and Muhammad Abdulrahman became courageous to go to people. Though Kattilasseri and Abdulrahman Sahib were Congress workers, they did not have much influence in the Congress since the organisational structure inside the Congress was the reflection of varnashrama system. Generally they lost trust in the Congress. They had trust only in M. P. Narayana Menon. M. P. Narayana Menon understood the only way to stop the upcoming big torture is stopping the protest. He asked the national leaders to stop the protest. Though, through a statement, the message to stop the protest could have been conveyed within 24 hours where newspapers worked well, no such a statement was made.

==== Arrest warrants ====
On 19 August 1921 a group of police including Hitchcock and Thomas left for Thirurangadi. They had arrest warrants for 24 people including Ali Musliyar prepared by Hitchcock and signed by Thomas with them. It is said Variamkunnath Kunjahammad Haji's was in the list but removed because of Variamkunnath Kunjahammad Haji's connection with Hitchcock and SI Ramanathayyar.

==== Search for Ali Musliyar ====
The people of Thomas-Hitchcock unleashed attacks widely in Thirurangadi, searching for Ali Musliyar. At this time Ali Musliyar was in a secret place in Thirurangadi discussing with other leaders of the protest about how to respond to the British. The meeting reached a decision to stop protesting for the time being in the situation the Congress abandoned them and to entrust Ali Musiyar to tell the Collector that they are stopping the protest and to demand the release of those arrested.

== Leadership in rebellion ==
=== Thirurangadi firing incident and beginning of war ===
Thirurangadi firing incident
- Part of massacre, Malabar rebellion, Khilafat Movement, Indian independence movement, Non-cooperation movement and suppression of protest
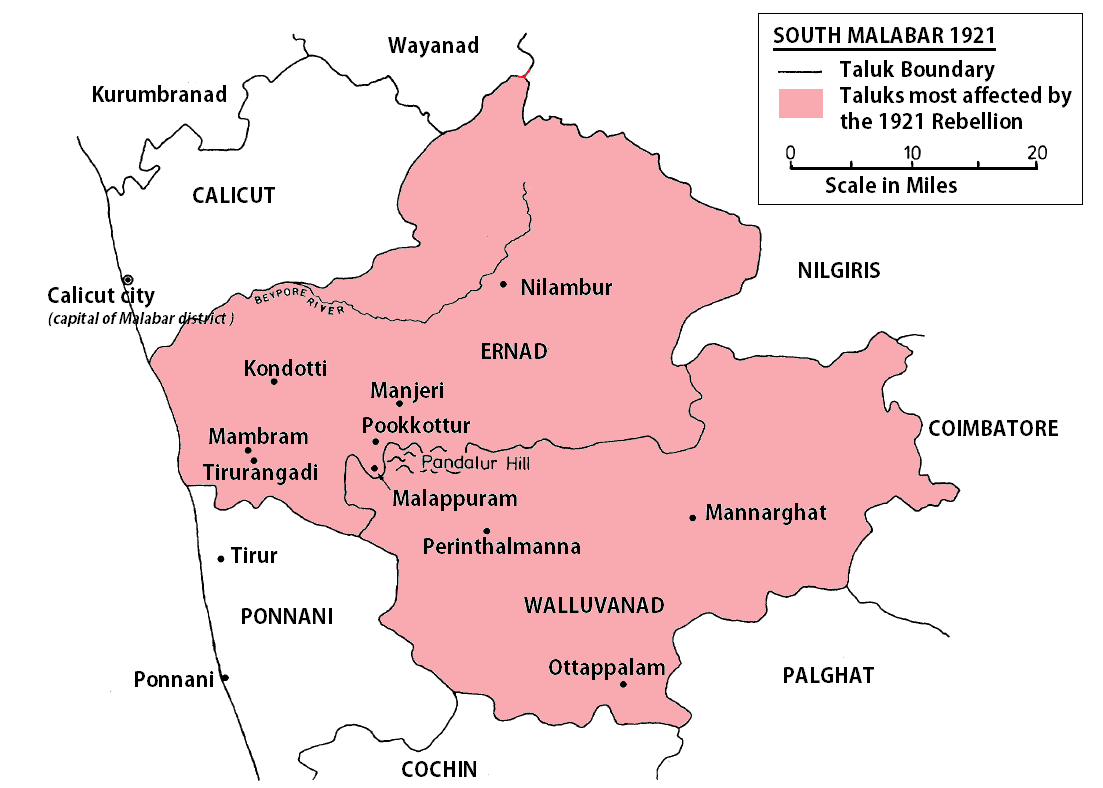
- South Malabar in 1921; areas in red show taluks affected by the 1921 rebellion
Date	20 August 1921
Location	Thirurangadi, Malabar district, British India
Result	Revolutionary victory; Firing suppressed; Withdrawal of British forces; Beginning of the Malabar rebellion

Belligerents
110 white troops of Leinster Regiment; 30 Reserve policemen; 60 personnel from Malabar Special Police	Mappila rebels

Commanders and leaders
Collector E. F. Thomas; William Rorford; Johnson †; Rowley †; Moitheen †	Probably no one Lavakkutty (alleged)

Strength
200	Unarmed 2000–3000 (everyone might not have participated)
- Casualties occurred on both sides

The Thirurangadi firing occurred when Ali Musliyar approached the British requesting to release the people arrested and at a time when he became ready to stop the protest. Unlike the Jallianwala Bagh massacre of 1919, the Thirurangadi firing got suppressed. The firing was resisted effectively though casualties occurred. The rebellion began bringing some area of South Malabar under the control of the leaders of the rebellion started after suppressing the Thirurangadi firing on 20 August 1921. Ali Musliyar sent a person to inform Variamkunnath Kunjahammad Haji about the incidents in Thirurangadi.

=== Assumption of leadership ===
Haji came to Malabar after his last trip to Mecca, in 1914. R. H. Hitchcock says "On his return he was carefully looked after and appeared grateful; any way for six years he lived an irreproachable life." It was during the rebellion began after the firing incident took place in Thirurangadi by Collector Thomas at a large group of people gathered there that he again became active in the struggle against the British, in a moment.

== Rule ==
=== Before declaration of independent country ===
Intense war was fought 21–24 August 1921 after suppressing the Thirurangadi firing on 20 August 1921. By the night of 24 August the control of 200 villages of Eranad, Valluvanad Ponnani, Kozhikode taluks were taken over by the revolutionaries from the British. On the night of 24 August 1921 leaders including Variyamkunnan and Ali Musliyar held a meeting (several things that are to be decided had been decided in the Thekkekalam meeting).

In the meeting Variyamkunnan divided his new country into four divisions. Each was given to each leader. The Mannarkad division was entrusted with Chembresseri Thangal; Thirurangadi, Ali Musliyar; Valluvanad, Kumarambathur Seethi Koya Thangal; Pookottur, Kunjithangal. Variamkunnan retained Nilambur, Pandallur, Pandikkad and Thuvvur under his control. Under them each region was given a smaller leader. Each region had a military head. These "lieutenants" had the duty of recruiting soldiers, training them, and procurement of weapons. That was Lavakkutty and Kunjalavi in Thirurangadi. In that of Chembresseri Thangal it was Aamakundan; and in that of Seeethi Koya Thangal, Thaliyil Unnenkutty Haji. In Pookottur it was Vadakkuveettil Manmad. In that of Variamkunnan, it was Naik Chekkutti (in the battles directly led by Variamkunnan, Variyamkunnan himself was the commander). Rulers in all divisions were under Variamkunnan. He was above them all.

The meeting decided to declare in Manjeri the formation of a new independent country. The meeting wound up deciding to announce the state declaration at Manjeri.

=== Malayala Rajyam ===
Variyankunnath Kunjahammad Haji established an independent state as part of the Indian independence movement and Khilafat movement on 25 August 1921. He made the state declaration in the Manjeri proclamation on 25 August 1921. Its name was Malayala Rajyam. The rebels used British titles such as 'Assistant Inspector', 'Colonel', 'Collector', 'Governor', 'Viceroy' and (less conclusively) 'King'. Because the Khilafat movement in the region, utilised by Variyankunnath, controlled the parallel government it was called Khilafat raj. It had its own passport, currency, and separate system of taxation. Variyankunnath abolished the Jenmi system. He set up military and several battles were fought against the British.

In those days, the police would write a statement and make the prisoner sign it. Otherwise, a statement would be written, getting the signature beforehand. Even in the statement of Variyankunnath written by R. H. Hitchcock, Variyankunnath said, "There is no Khilafat here. Khilafat is a Turkey subject."

Madhavan Nair says from beginning to end, Variyankunnath's enemies were the Government and those aiding the Government. Because no one got opportunity to aid the Government in the beginning of the revolt, the target of his warpath was the police and military then.

R. H. Hitchcock says Variyankunnath was only against the Hindus who supported the Government.

Ali Musliyar and Variyankunnath Kunjahammad Haji made use of their influence to prevent the forcible conversion. As leaders they followed a secular approach

Rebels like Kunjahammad Haji tried to ensure that the Hindus are not assaulted or subject to looting. They punished rioters who assaulted Hindus. Haji, who did not show special consideration to the Mappilas, killed several Mappilas who supported the government or gave them other type of punishments.

=== Chekutty murder ===
Several British loyalist Mappilas had taken refuge in the Khan Bahadur Chekutty's house. With them was CI Mangatt Narayana Menon. Twenty four people including Kunjahammad Haji went to the Chekutty's house; they had guns with them. Naik Haidru killed Chekutty by shooting. As the shooting happened other Adhikaris and CI Narayana Menon escaped through the side of the kitchen. Naik Thami read a charge sheet near the fallen Chekutty which took forty minutes to finish. This charge sheet contained 300 "crimes". Chekutty, as a servant of the colonial government, had caused so much trouble to ordinary people in Eranad. After the reading of the crimes, Kunjahammad Haji decapitated Chekutty. Though several historians have recorded that the Chekutty's severed head was stuck to a spear and brought to the place of the Manjeri proclamation, K. K. Abdul Kareem says that this is not correct, and that the severed head was thrown to a thicket in the Chekutty's own plot.

Anyway, the Chekutty murder shocked everyone in Ernad. Those who heard about the murder, which people had thought unusual and impossible, rushed to Anakkayam and Manjeri. Thus the crossroad joining four main roads in Manjeri was crowded with people for Kunjahammad Haji's historic declaration.

=== Namboothiri bank ===
An important incident during the peak of the war was the attempt by the chottu pattalam to loot the Namboothiri bank in Manjeri, which was well known in the Malabar region, and run by Pulloor Kuttyanikkad Manakkal Damodaran Namboothiri. The action taken by Kunjahammad Haji against this is one of the best examples of his skill of administration. There was jewellery worth millions of rupees belonging to people including ordinary peasants in the bank. The first approach by Namboothiri knowing of the loot was to inform Kunjahammad Haji. On learning about the loot, without sparing a minute, Kunjahammad Haji set out with a few followers at midnight itself. On seeing Kunjahammad Haji, the looters escaped running. Kunjahammad Haji decided to guard the bank since all what was in the bank was of the public, several of them ordinary peasants. He took charge of protection on 24 August 1921. He entrusted some of his soldiers to stand guard over the bank and some others to capture the looters. Kunjahammad Haji fully examined the bank. As Shankunni Nair informed that the unrecorded jewellery in the shelf was from the Namboothiri's house, soon it was sent to Anakkayam. After that he made a proclamation to take back the pledged articles from the bank giving the money immediately. Because of suddenness several did not have money. He ordered, such people who did not have money, should give whatever they have, to take back the pledged articles; but their account should be kept. This was done by the bank clerk Shankunni Nair and Kapad Krishnan Nair. Each day Shankunni Nair would go to Anakkayam closing the bank in the evening. On arrival by Shankunni Nair with the key in the morning, Kunjahammad Haji would open the bank. Appukuttan, the son of Namboothiri, said to A.K. Kodoor that in those days Kunjahammad Haji would stay on the bank building itself.

R. H. Hitchcock says Kunjahammad Haji did not loot the bank.

=== Number of Hindus killed and forcibly converted ===
There were different reports about the number of forced conversions with the report of the Congress saying that even the forced conversions are not even more than three in number while the District Magistrate of Malabar, in response for demanding safe estimate of forced conversions by the Secretary of State, says about just around 180 cases of conversion about which reliable information received.

Sumit Sarkar in Modern India quotes an Arya Samaj source that claimed about 600 Hindus were killed and 2,500 forcibly converted during the rebellion. (Note: See also: Diwan Bahadur C. Gopalan Nair, The Moplah Rebellion, 1921. p. 58. "It is impossible, in the absence of a census of the rebel area, to state the number of persons who were killed by the rebels, "but the number of persons among the civil population is believed to be between 500 and 600" according to the information given by Government. "No statistics have been compiled regarding the number of women and children among the persons killed." (Madras Mail 14 November 1922)".) The British forces had killed a group of lower caste Hindus mistaking them for Mappilas because they used to shave the head like Mappilas.

Variankunnath said in a cablegram reported on 7 December 1921 in two American newspapers that the reported a few cases of conversion (not forced conversion or murder in the verbatim sentence) of Hindus were part of the British plot. He also blamed British spies and agents for this and claimed to have killed the British spies and agents.

There are no reports of lower caste Hindus being forcibly converted to Islam during the rebellion. Most of such stories of forced conversions are related to high caste Hindus.

The stories of forced conversion of Hindus to Islam during the rebellion by Mappilas are not reliable. It is claimed that no one came forward claiming to be the descendants of those who were subject to such forced conversions even 97 years after the rebellion which in turn shows forced conversions are not true.

==== Return of refugees ====
By the end of January 1922 Eranad and Walluwanad taluks were safe for refugees to return home. Refugees returned home after the rebellion. Certain relief works stopped after a certain period. All relief camps, except one in Calicut for forced converts, decrepit, old and infirm people that was maintained until July 1922, were closed at the end of February, with end of martial law. Among Hindus who fled from the rebellion area it was mainly Jenmis who were yet to return to their homes. Hindu refugees including upper section returned to their native regions after a certain period.

==== Atrocities under British martial law ====
It was in the second phase of the rebellion (after the proclamation of martial law by the British government) that the alleged attrocies against Hindus took place. It was Muslims who did not support the rebellion that suffered the most due to the rebellion.

Arya Samajists who got support from the British government considered only the grievance of Hindus and ignored Mapillas.

=== Variamkunnan and Thuvvur Incident ===
Critics very often criticise the rebellion citing the Thuvvur incident. The Thuvvur incident is an incident of punishing those people who raped Mappila women and aided the British force by giving them information about Mappilas, so that the British force could find the Mappilas to kill. Ten persons were captured for punishment. Dalits helped to find the people who gave information to the British force. Eight of the ten had been killed by the time Chembrasseri Thangal came. Two Mappilas include in those killed. One Mappila killed was beaten so that the skin would damage severely. Chembrassery Thangal prevented this extrajudicial killing and set the remaining two free. The people responsible for this were taken to Variamkunnan and Variyankunnath Kunjahammad Haji gave punishment for conducting the extrajudicial punishment. The story of the Thuvvur well into which the severed heads were put and the narrative with number of people killed differing such as some 20 or 36 or 38 or some 35 also exist.

== Involvement in events of war ==
=== Leadership ===
It was after the Thirurangadi firing incident that Haji took the leadership of the rebellion against the British in a moment after six or seven years of silence. He had come to Malabar after his last trip to Mecca; in 1914.

=== Military ===
His military included a group of previous members of the military that fought in the First World War. They had weapons those were seized and those were manufactured after the rebellion started. Most of his military were Khilafat Movement supporters. His forces against the British included uniformed members and a certain number of ex-sepoys.

=== Escape of adversaries ===
As the rebellion helmed by the Haji and others began to spread across the Ernad and Valluvanad taluks of erstwhile Malabar district, British officers and the local police loyal to them escaped From the first day of war those fled to Kozhikode from Eranad include some pro-British Mappilas besides Jenmis. In South Malabar, especially Walluvanad, many Hindus along with Muslims attacked government institutions. At this time even some Nambudiris were with Khilafat Movement supporters.

=== Plot by British loyalists ===
From the first day of war, looting also started. The looters included even CI Narayana Menon who participated in the looting wearing Mappila dress. CI Narayana Menon used criminals and prisoners to loot. One of the main looters of Thirurangadi was Kizhakan Mukari who was pretending as Variamkunnath. Fifteen looters including Mukhari was caught on very 21 August 1921. All of them belonged to the chottu pattalam (the private army of chiefstains who were conducive for the British government) of Khan Bahadur-Khan Sahibs. Those who tried to loot the Namboothiri Bank were Mappilas loyal to the British Thus the loot was carried out by those who are loyal to the British. The main people who tried to thwart the war against the British were the Mappilas loyal to the British. Intervention by Ali Musliyar and Variamkunnan stopped their attempt to an extent.

=== Manjeri proclamation ===
Around 25 August 1921 he declared an independent state in Manjeri with Haji its undisputed ruler. Later on its own passport, currency, and its own system of taxation were introduced Even in the Manjeri proclamation which was made within few days after the rebellion started he said he had known it was propagated in the outside world that it was a war between the Muslims and Hindus. He also blamed Mappilas loyal to the British similar to Khan Bahadur Chekkutti and Jenmis for propagating this. He also said he did not intent to make it a Muslims' only country.

=== Battle of Pookottur ===
Variamkunnath Kunjahammad Haji came to Pookottur. An armed force was set up, to attack the British force at Pookottur, on their way to rescue the British military personnel stuck in the area where the revolution took place. And the Battle of Pookottur was fought on 26 August 1921.

=== Surrender of Ali Musliyar ===
On 30 August 1921 a firing occurred at the Thirurangadi mosque in which 114 people including Ali Musliyar were present between the British force and those inside the mosque. Huge casualties occurred on both sides. Some people managed to escape and ran to Variamkunnath Kunjahammad Haji. Ali Musliyar and 39 followers surrendered on 31 August 1921 when he became certain that the mosque would be destroyed. Immediately after this Variamkunnath Kunjahammad Haji asked his soldiers to move to forests.

=== British martial law ===
Immediately after the surrender of Ali Musliyar, Variamkunnath Kunjahammad Haji had asked his forces to move to forests. On 1 September 1921 martial law was declared specifically targeting Mappilas by the British. Those who would allow Mappillas who come from certain area to live were to be punished and in case Mappillas come to live nearby, it was to be reported to the nearest police station to avoid punishment. Because of the law Mappilas could not go outside or shops or mosques. But Mappilas loyal to the British got the pass so that they could move freely.

Massacres of Mappilas

Even a vast number of Mappilas who did not take part in any protest were also tortured. The British conducted a series of massacres against Muslims, in several places. Women were raped. Mappilas' houses were burnt. On 2 September 1921 the British force which arrived at Manjeri attacked all Mappila houses. Then came an order from the British to shoot all Mappillas seen outside. A group of lower caste Hindus would shave their head like Mappilas. So even many lower caste Hindus as well as Mappillas were killed because of this.

Divide and rule policy

Some Jenmis betrayed Mappilas. Under the pretext of revenge, militant employees of, the Mappilas loyal to the British, unleashed cruelty. They looted houses. Some ordinary Mapilas joined them for vengeance thereby causing the goal of Mappillas loyal to the British, to destroy Hindu-Muslim unity, to be fulfilled. Hindu-Muslim enmity grew. This was part of divide and rule policy of the British. They propagated it was a Hindu-Muslim riot through newspapers. All this happed after martial law was declared by the British. And the British brought almost all area under their control.

=== Guerrilla warfare ===
On 13 September 1921 guerrilla warfare was started by Variyankunnath Kunjahammad Haji. They carried out guerrilla warfare with separate small groups of 50–500 people. They began to seize the food for the British force. The British would not succeed in the war.

=== Martial law and passport ===
On 16 September 1921 he declared martial law in Nalambur. As per the martial law orders a pass was required to leave the area under his control. Moreover, the British and people loyal to the British were not allowed to come outside after afternoon; if seen violating they may be fired at. He issued passports for that purpose. With his martial law the people denied freedom to move were the people loyal to the British. The most important thing he did after declaring martial law was punishing those who helped the British and carried out the riot.

=== Coming of Gurkhas ===
From 12 October 1921 the force including the Gurkhas, Chins and Kachins came to Malabar. Important reason for the failure of the First War of Independence was the Gurkhas. They were more interested in conducting massacres of ordinary people than fighting war directly. The Mappilas were becoming unsuccessful in the fight while the number of the Gurkhas was more in number and with so many modern weapons.

=== Battle of Areekode ===
There were six or seven people who left from the Variamkunnan's movement.They made some violence in Areekode.Variamkunnan restored peace there. Knowing this, force from the British side reached there and made a fight. In the fight seventeen people from the Variamkunnan's force and as per the witnesses all from the British side got killed. Later, the Gurkhas bombed the Variamkunnan's force, who were hiding in a thicket, and a large number of people were killed.

=== Battle of Pandikkad ===
Battle of Pandikkad
- Part of the Malabar rebellion, the Khilafat Movement and Indian independence movement
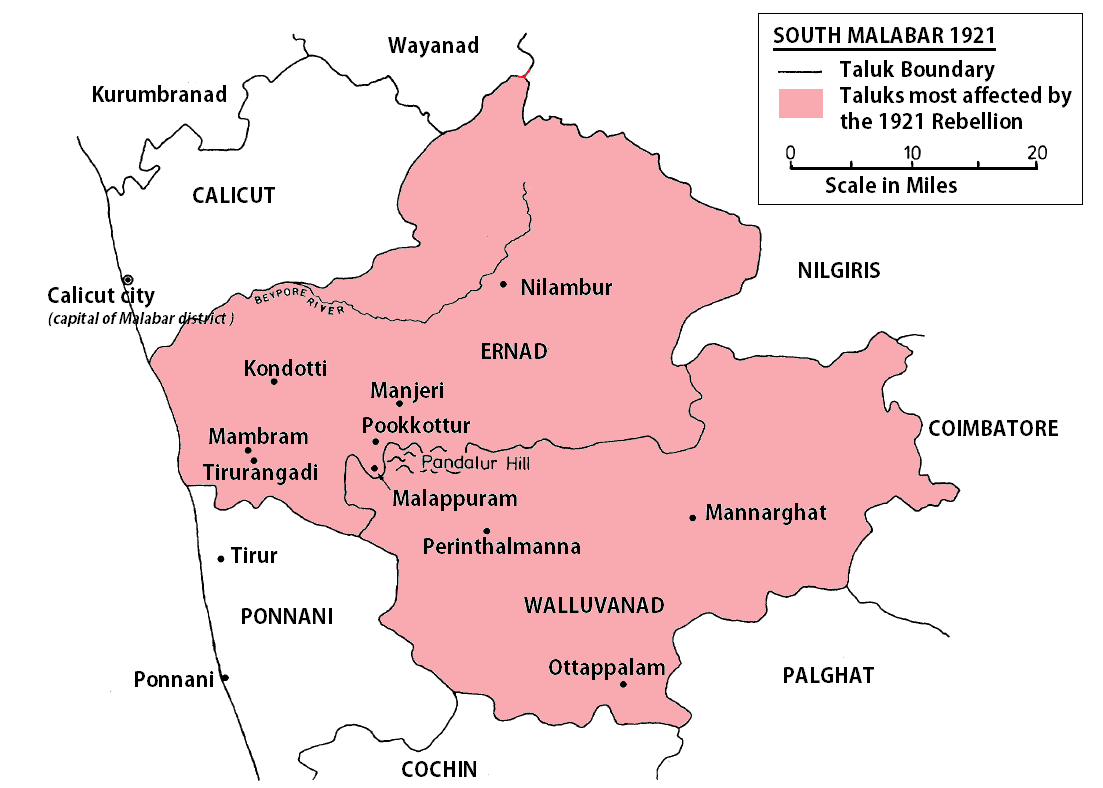
- South Malabar in 1921; areas in red show taluks affected by the 1921 rebellion
Date	14 November 1921
Location	Pandikkad, Malabar district, British India
Result	Revolutionary victory

Belligerents
British government	Mappila rebels

Commanders and leaders
Averell †	

Strength
150–300	2000 (400 of whom barged into the chandappura)

Casualties and losses
75–120	54 (as per the British government)

Variyamkunnan kept knowing about the increasing attacks of the Gurkhas: that the Gurkhas molesting the women and killing the children in his country. He decided to check their activity. Thus the historic Pandikkad battle was fought on 14 November 1921 in a pre-emptive attack, leading to the death of 75–120 Gurkhas. The Pandikkad battle is one of the examples of how the British tried to create a false narrative.

At the beginning of November the army had reached Pandikkad from different places in 61 trucks. They included Gurkhas, Sikhs, and local seypoys. The 2/8th Gurkha rifles camp was in the then Pandikkad chandappura (a kind of marketplace) near a paddy field on the Perinthalmanna road. Their head was Captain Averell. This chandappura belonged to British loyalist Mappila, Kudaliyil Moosakutty. The place was under the rule of Variyamkunnath though there were a police station and an army camp.

Variyamkunnan decided to kill the Gurkhas by attacking the chandappura. Thus on 13 November 1921, 2000 people reached under the leadership of Variamkunnan, Chembrasseri Ibmichi Koya Thangal and Mukri Ahamad. Variamkunnan had given them special training for two days, in Chembrasseri, Karuvaarakkund and Kheezhaattur. Around 5 am 400 people from them barged into the chandappura by knocking the mud wall down, saying takbir. According to Hitchcock there were 150 Gurkhas in the camp but Manji Ayamutti, who participated in the battle, in an interview given to A. K. Kodoor, says there were 300 of them. The revolutionaries began to cut apart them before they could do anything. Even some Gurkhas died in the sleep. Even some Gurkhas fought between themselves losing mental balance. Soon regained mental balance, the Gurkhas fought maximum using the hand bomb and a Lewis gun. By that time several Gurkhas had died. The Gurkhas tried their level best to shield Averell. However a group of 5 people killed Averell, who was in a special position, after hacking the Gurkhas aside. Like Lancaster, Eaton and Harvey the death of Averell was also an event of great loss for the British.

The Pandikkad battle caused great humiliation for the British. To cover up the humiliation they falsely lowered casualties on the British side and falsely claimed victory. They released the false report that the casualties on the side of revolutionaries was 54 and 4 on the other; on a war footing as ever before. But M. P. S. Menon says 75 Gurkhas had been killed in the battle. Manji Ayamutti who participated in the battle says 120 Gurkhas had been killed. During the Pandikkad battle, fighting took place outside of the camp also. The revolutionaries killed the Pandikkad post master and two government party people. Though the house of Moosa Kutty was rounded up, he had left.

=== Genocide of Mappilas ===
Again a great series of massacres were unleashed against innocent Mappilas. There was no a day without the massacre of 200–300 Mappilas. This led to weakening of the fight against the British forces and the Mappila fighters started to surrender.

The British military massacred thousands of Mappilas, who were hiding in forests, hills and uninhabited houses. They killed hundreds of Mappila women and children. They raped helpless Mappila women. They set Mappila houses on fire. The British government through a proclamation of order restricted mobility of Mappilla women and children. So they were compelled to remain in the rebel areas fearing the police and military attack, suffering poverty. These sufferings were unknown to the outside world due to prohibition orders in these riot stricken areas.

=== Some other battles ===
==== Attack at Hajippara ====
Variamkunnan had camped at Hajippara. A group, including the Gurkhas and Kachins, attacked there and became successful in taking so much rice and cattle. In the fight, 17 from Variamkunnan's side and 35 from Gurkha-Kachin's side got killed.

==== Attack at Kallaamoola ====
He changed his hiding place to the Kallaamoola hill storing food centering its valley Kurukkan Pottikkulam. On 8 December 1921 a large group consisting of the Gurkhas and Kachins attacked this place as well. In this fight a huge loss occurred for Variamkunnan. Large amount of rice and thousands of cattle were captured from there. In this attack 13 from Gurkhas, 8 from Kachins and 24 from the Variamkunnan's side got killed. And the Cherumas and Advasis also were captured and taken to Nilambur besides the food by the British force.

==== Retaliation by Variamkunnan ====
Variamkunnan attacked a bangalow. He saved captured Cheruman-Advasi soldiers of his force on 11 December 1921. Right after this he went to Goodalloor where he attacked and killed a policeman, who was at the Panthalloor training camp (belonging to the British side). After this the Variamkunnan's group got divided to three. One attacked a police station and killed three from the police (belonging to the British side). Another group attacked a survey office (belonging to the British side) and killed three from them. The third group attacked a post office and killed a policeman. In this operation Variamkunnan's force got a huge victory. In this fight 7 people got killed on Variamkunnan's side and 27 on the other.

=== Surrender of Haji's soldiers and massacre of Mappilas ===
To cover up the humiliation caused by the defeat in the Pandikkad battle, the Gurkhas again, as they had done before, targeted those who did not take part in any part of the war. This was the regular plot of the British: the act of murdering the poor people when not possible to win over the revolutionaries by fighting thereby causing them to surrender by instilling the sense of guilt. On the other hand, the moral revolutionaries would not attack none other than the military personnel. In Karuvarakund, Thuvvur, Konnara, Cheroor, the East Kozhikode region and Pandikkad the British army did inexplicable atrocities. This caused the Mappila fighters to surrender en masse. This was the main cause for the rebellion to cease. This led to loss of control over several regions from the hands of revolutionaries.

Superintendent Amu in an interview given to Moyyarath Sankaran, says it became a normal thing that the White military personnel, the Gurkhas and Malabar Special Police kill the Mappilas without taking the cognisance of the party the victim belonged to. They killed innumerable number of women and children by using the bayonet. Thus there was not a day without the massacre of 200–300 Mappilas. In short they lost all means of peace; the opposition by Mappilas began to decline; they also started to surrender.

The move by the British government to attack women, children and the elderly using the Gurkhas and Kachins, thereby forcing the rebels depressing mentally to surrender was actually the cause for the failure of rebels in the war. The revolutionaries were distressed that the innocent get killed because the revolutionaries themselves do not surrender. This was a plot of Hitchcock and Humphries knowing the martyrdom culture of Mappillas to defeat it. This plan devised, understanding it is not possible to win over fighting those who set out wishing death, helped the British win in the 1921 war. British officials said they attained the expected goal about this. By first weeks of December 27000 revolutionaries had surrendered this way, says M. P. S. Menon. In short it was not the might of the celebrated British elite army, but 'psychological war' that destroyed the Variyankunnath Kunjahammad Haji's military and the parallel government.

=== Karuvarakund meeting ===
To avoid the genocide of the innocent, people including the leaders began to think of surrendering. Chembrasseri Thangal, Seethi Koya Thangal and Unneen Kutty Haji suggested surrender. Though it shocked Variamkunnath, he did not express it.

=== Disbandment of military ===
Variyamkunnath disbanded the army after he could not make the military operation at Palemad. He could not move to Palemad because he was surrounded by the British force. It is said that 25000 of Variamkunnan's forces had reached Palemad on 18 December 1921.

=== Surrender of leaders ===
Leaders Chembrasseri Thangal and Seethi Koya Thangal surrendered. Chembrassery Thangal's right hand Unneen Kutty Haji and his 450 followers surrendered. Thus a huge number of surrenders took place this time.

=== Capture of Variyamkunnath ===
On 5 January 1922, through a planned operation, Variyamkunnath was captured.Variyamkunnath wrestled for half an hour and he was chained.

=== Destroying of evidence ===
The British burned his body and all records related to his rule .They destroyed all records through raids in all houses and by offering rewards.

=== Last wish ===
When asked about his last wish by Humphreys he said shooting should be from the front with the eyes are unfolded and hands are free. His last wish was accepted by Humphreys.

== Letter to The Hindu ==
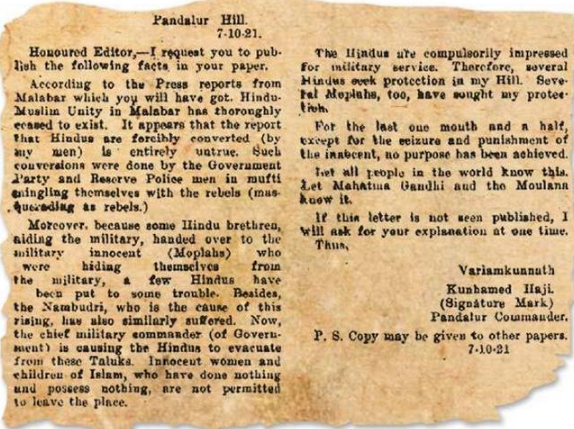
A letter written by Variyan Kunnathu Kunjahammed Haji which appeared in the newspaper The Hindu on 18 October 1921

The letter written by Variyan Kunnathu Kunjahammed Haji, which appeared on the newspaper The Hindu on 18 October 1921:

"Honoured Editor, I request you to publish the following facts in your paper. According to the Press Reports from Malabar which you will have got. Hindu-Muslim Unity in Malabar has thoroughly ceased to exist. It appears that the report that Hindus are forcibly converted (by my men) is entirely untrue. Such conversions were done by the Government Party and Reserve Policemen in mufti mingling themselves with the rebels (masquerading as rebels.) Moreover, because some Hindu brethren, aiding the military, handed over to the military innocent (Moplahs) who were hiding themselves from the military, a few Hindus have been put to some trouble. Besides, the Nambudiri, who is the cause of this rising, has also similarly suffered. The Hindus are compulsorily impressed for military service. Therefore, several Hindus seek protection in my Hill. Several Moplahs, too, have sought my protection. Now the chief military commander [of the government] is causing Hindus to evacuate from these Taluks. Innocent women and children of Islam, who have done nothing and possess nothing, are not permitted to leave the place. For the last one month and a half, except for the seizure and punishment of the innocent, no purpose has been achieved. Let all the people in the world know this. Let Mahatma Gandhi and Moulana know it. If this letter is not seen published, I will ask your explanation at one time."

== Action against persecution of Hindus ==
=== Publicising British plot ===
Variamkunnath Kunjahammed Haji said, in a cablegram received by the Friends of Freedom for India, the reported forced conversion of many Hindus to Mohammadanism and killing others were by the British agents and spies. He also claimed to have killed theses British spies and agents. This was published in two American newspapers on 7 December 1921. Variamkunnath Kunjahammad Haji sent a letter to The Hindu claiming that the forced conversion of Hindus was done by the Government Party and Reserve Policemen in mufti mingling themselves with the rebels (masquerading as rebels.)

=== Execution of miscreants ===
He was of the opinion that the reported forced conversions (though there is no forced conversion or murder of Hindus in the verbatim sentence in the message sent by Variamkunnan to the Friends of Freedom for India but there is mention about a few cases of conversion in the verbatim sentence) during the Malabar rebellion were done by vandals of the Government Party and Reserve Policemen in mufti mingling themselves with the rebels (masquerading as rebels). He said in a cablegram to have put the British agents and spies joined his forces as patriots only to discredit his soldiers to death, after the report of alleged forced conversion of Hindus to Mohammedanism and killing the rest of the Hindus.

=== Punishing rioters ===
The most important thing he did after declaring martial law was punishing those who helped the British and carried out the riot.

=== Thekkekalam meeting ===
To thwart the attempt of Mappilas loyal to the British, Variamkunnath Kunnahammad Haji, on the second day of the war started, organised the Thekkekalam meeting. In this meeting, even the first decision taken was that any activity that could cause a different opinion about from Hindus shall not happen.

=== Exposing compulsory military service ===
In a letter written to The Hindu, Variyamkunnath Kunjahammad Haji exposed the attempt for compulsory military service by the British. In the letter, he said the following.

"The Hindus are compulsorily impressed for military service. Therefore, several Hindus seek protection in my Hill. Several Moplahs, too, have sought my protection. Now the chief military commander [of the government] is causing Hindus to evacuate from these Taluks. Innocent women and children of Islam, who have done nothing and possess nothing, are not permitted to leave the place."

=== Adequate security to people of other faiths ===
Haji gave orders to his followers that people of other faiths were to be given adequate security and not be subjected to torture. But at the same time, he targeted all those who helped the British, be they Hindu or Muslim.

=== Declaration of death penalty ===
Variyamkunnath Kunjahammad Haji declared the death penalty to people who attempt forceful conversion.

== Execution ==
Haji was sentenced to death and executed by Commander Colonel Humphrey's firing squad for his involvement in Malabar rebellion. He was shot dead on 20 January 1922 at Kottakkunnu.

== See also ==
- Ali Musliyar
- Nellikkuth, Manjeri
- Battle of Pookkottur
- False flag operation
- Martial law
- Guerrilla warfare
- Indian independence movement
- Khilafat Movement
- Non-cooperation movement
- Malabar rebellion
- Varna (Hinduism)
- Jenmi
- Jallianwala Bagh massacre (in 1919)
- Wagon tragedy
- Ottoman Caliphate (abolished in 1924)
- Abolition of the Ottoman Caliphate ( in 1924)
- History of Malappuram district
- Marakkar
- Kunjali Marakkar
- Battle of Cochin (1504)
- Land reform in Kerala
- British Raj
- Dominion of India
- Pseudohistory
- Disinformation
- Fake news in India
