= Malabar rebellion =

Conflict in India in 1921–1922

Malabar Rebellion
- Part of the Khilafat Movement, the Mappila riots, and the Indian independence movement
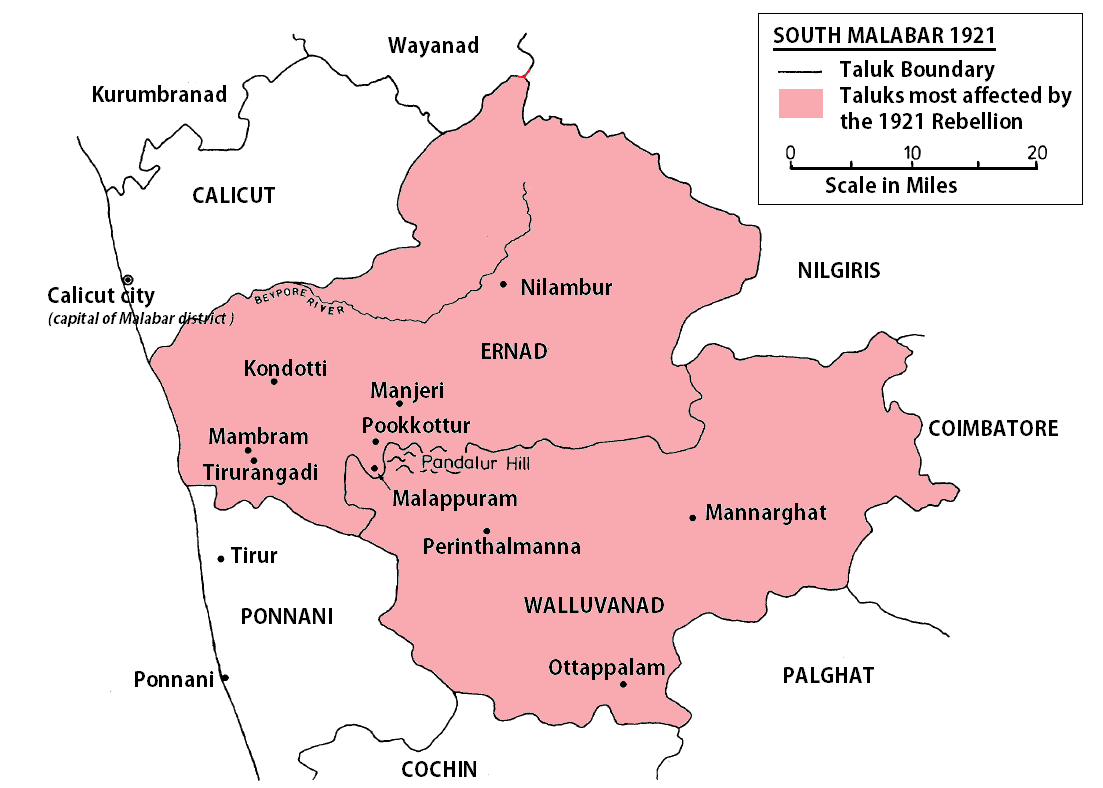
- South Malabar in 1921; areas in red show Taluks affected by the rebellion
Date	1921–1922
Location	Malabar district, British India
Result	Rebellion suppressed

Belligerents
British Raj: Madras Presidency; Jenmi landlords	Mappila Muslim Rebels

Commanders and leaders
Rufus Isaacs (Viceroy of India); Freeman Freeman-Thomas (Governor of Madras); Thomas T. S. Hitchcock; A. S. P. Amu	Ali Musliyar (executed); Variyankunnath Kunjahammad Haji (executed); Sithi Koya Thangal; Chembrasery Thangal (executed); K. Moiteenkutti Haji (executed); Kappad Krishnan Nair; Konnara Thangal (executed); M. P. Narayana Menon; Pandiyatt Narayanan Nambeesan; Mozhikunnath Brahmadathan Nambudiripad

Casualties and losses
Official figures: 43 combatants killed 126 wounded	Official figures: 2,339 rebels killed 1,652 injured 45,404 imprisoned

The Malabar rebellion of 1921 (also called Moplah rebellion, and Mappila rebellion, Malayalam: malabār kalāpam) started as a resistance against the British Raj in certain places in the southern part of old Malabar district of present-day Kerala.

For the mappila side, the rebellion was primarily a peasant revolt against the colonial government. During the uprising, the rebels attacked various symbols and institutions of the colonial state, such as telegraph lines, train stations, courts and post offices.

There were also a series of clashes between the Mappila Muslims and Hindus, and Muslim landlords, the latter supported by the British colonial government, throughout the 19th and early 20th centuries. The heavy-handed suppression of the Khilafat Movement by the colonial government was met by resistance in the Eranad and Valluvanad taluks of Malabar. The Mappilas attacked and took control of police stations, colonial government offices, courts and government treasuries.

For six months from August 1921, the rebellion extended over 2,000 square miles (5,200 km^{2}) – some 40% of the South Malabar region of the Madras Presidency. The British colonial government sent troops to quell the rebellion and martial law imposed. An estimated 10,000 people died, although official figures put the numbers at 2337 rebels killed, 1652 injured and 45,404 imprisoned. Unofficial estimates put the number imprisoned at almost 50,000 of whom 20,000 were deported, mainly to the penal colony in the Andaman Islands, while around 10,000 went missing.

According to Arya Samaj about 600 Hindus were killed and 2,500 were forcibly converted to Islam during the rebellion. During the rebellion, thousands of Hindus were murdered and forcibly converted to Islam.

Contemporary colonial administrators and modern historians differ markedly in their assessment of the incident, debating whether the revolts were triggered by religious fanaticism or agrarian grievances. At the time, the Indian National Congress repudiated the movement and it remained isolated from the wider nationalist movement. However, some contemporary Indian evaluations now view the rebellion as a national upheaval against colonial rule and the most important event concerning the political movement in Malabar during the period.

In its magnitude and extent, it was an unprecedented popular upheaval, the likes of which has not been seen in Kerala before or since. While the Mappilas were in the vanguard of the movement and bore the brunt of the struggle, several non-Mappila leaders actively sympathized with the rebels' cause, giving the uprising the character of a national upheaval. In 1971, the Government of Kerala officially recognized the active participants in the events as "freedom fighters".

The event is considered a genocide by Hindu groups who cite the mass murder, rape and forced conversions of hundreds of Hindus during the rebellion by Mappila Muslims allegedly led by Variyannkunnath Kunjahammad Haji.

== Background ==
=== Land ownership in Malabar ===
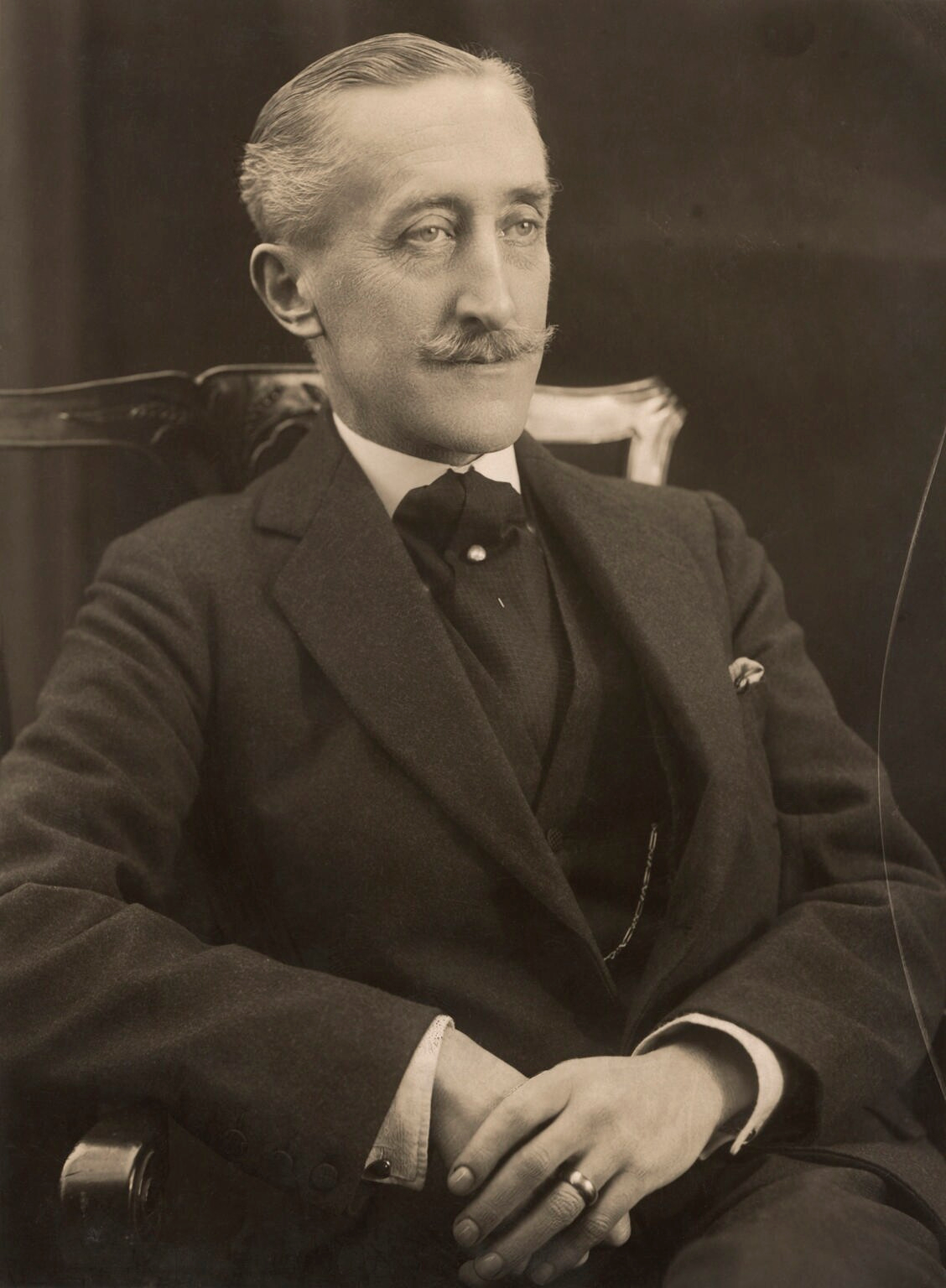
Freeman Freeman-Thomas, 1st Marquess of Willingdon, Governor of Madras during the Rebellions and later Viceroy and Governor-General of India

Malabar's agricultural system was historically based on a hierarchy of privileges, rights and obligations for all principal social groups in what British administrator William Logan sometimes referred to as the "Father of Tenancy Legislation" in Malabar, describing it as a system of 'corporate unity' or joint proprietorship of each of the principal land right holders:

==== Jenmi ====
The Jenmi, consisting mainly of the Namboothiri Brahmins and Nair chieftains, were the highest level of the hierarchy, and a class of people given hereditary land grants (''janmam'') by the Naduvazhis or rulers. The rights conveyed by this janmam were not a freehold in the European sense, but an office of dignity. Owing to their ritual status as priests (Nambudiris), the jenmis could neither cultivate nor supervise the land but would instead provide a grant of kanam (a form of land tenure) to a kanakkaran (holder of tenure) in return for a fixed share of the crops produced. Typically, a Jenmi would have a large number of kanakkarar under him.

==== Verumpattakkaran ====
The Verumpattakkarar, generally Thiyya and Mappila classes, cultivated the land but were also its part-proprietors under the kanakkarar. These classes were given a Verum Pattam (Simple Lease) of the land that was typically valid for one year. According to custom, they were also entitled to one-third or an equal share of the net produce.

The net produce of the land was the share left over after providing for the cherujanmakkar or all the other birthright holders such as the village carpenter, the goldsmith and agricultural labourers who helped to gather, prepare and store produce. The system ensured that no Jenmi could evict tenants under him except for non-payment of rent. This land tenure system was generally referred to as the janmi-kana-maryada (customary practices).

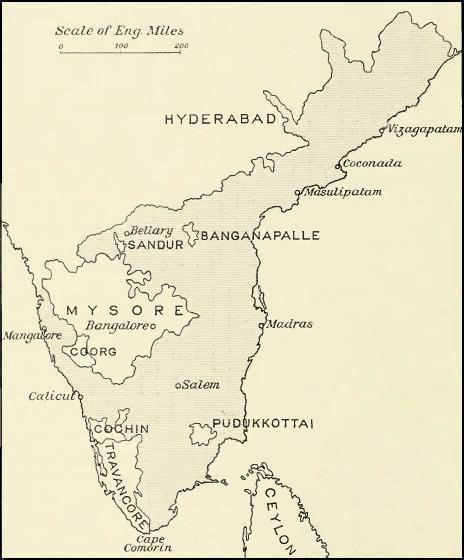
Map of the Madras Presidency, after the Fourth Anglo-Mysore War.

=== Land reforms and Mappila outbreaks ===
During the Mysorean invasion of Malabar, the Jenmi took refuge in neighbouring states. The tenants and the Nair army men who could not escape were converted into Islam, as described in William Logan's Malabar Manual. Thus, Tipu Sultan's Kingdom of Mysore, having driven the Jenmi out of Malabar, reached accord with the Muslim Kanakkars. A new system of land revenue was introduced for the first time in the region's history with the government share fixed on the basis of actual produce from the land.

However, within five years, the East India Company took over Malabar, defeating Tipu Sultan and ending his reign over the region. This allowed the Jenmi to return to their homes and regain the lands lost during the Mysorean invasion, with the help of the Company administration and its duly-constituted courts. The Company introduced several Western juridical concepts, such as that of absolute property rights, into the existing legal system of Malabar. Up until then, such rights had been unknown in the region and as a result all land became the private property of the Jenmi. This legal recognition gave them the right to evict tenants, which was in turn enforced through the colonial civil courts. In the words of William Logan:

The [British] authorities, recognised the Janmi as absolute owner of his holding, and therefore free to take as big a share of the produce of the soil as he could get out of the classes beneath him... (Gradually) The British Courts backed up by Police and Magistrates and troops and big guns made the Janmi's independence complete. The hard terms thus imposed on the Kanakkaran had, of course, the effect of hardening the terms imposed by the Kanakkaran on those below him, the Verumpattakkar. The one-third of the net produce to which the Verumpattakkaran was customarily entitled, was more and more encroached upon as the terms imposed on the Kanakkaran became harder and harder. (Government of Madras. 1882, Vol. I: xvii, xxxi–ii)

As conditions worsened, rents rose to as high as 75–80% of net produce, leaving the Verumpattakkar cultivators largely "only straw". This caused great resentment among the Mappilas, who, in the words of Logan, were "labouring late and early to provide a sufficiency of food for their wives and children". Resentment among the Muslim tenant population due to being vulnerable to rack renting, insecure tenancy, and eviction at the hands of Hindu landlords (jenmi) sustained by British courts, the Mappillas responded in a series of outbreaks, in which they wanted their own death, 29 in number, between 1836 and 1919 were suppressed. These usually involved the violence against Nambudiri and Nair landlords. During the nineteenth century conversions to Islam heightened dramatically as the backward caste Cheruman serfs embraced Islam so that they got liberation from the caste system and support from fellow Muslims to protest against jenmi tyranny. The colonial government referred to the outbreaks as "Moplah outrages", but modern historians tend to treat them as religious outbreaks or expressions of agrarian discontent. The outbreak of 1921–22 sustained this tradition of violence in Malabar with one crucial difference: this time it had also a political ideology and a formal organization.

=== Khilafat Movement ===
Diwan Bahadur C. Gopalan Nair in his book, The Moplah Rebellion 1921, writes thus:

...it was not mere fanaticism, it was not agrarian trouble, it was not destitution, that worked on the minds of Ali Musaliar and his followers. The evidence conclusively shows that it was the influence of the Khilafat and Non-co-operation movements that drove them to their crime. It is this which distinguishes the present from all previous outbreaks. Their intention was, absurd though it may seem, to subvert the British Government and to substitute a Khilafat Government by force of arms.(Judgement in Case No. 7 of 1921 on the file of the Special Tribunal, Calicut.) ...

Nair noted Ali Musliyar rose to prominence at the instance of a Khilafat conference held in Karachi. Furthermore, Musliyar was not a native of Tirurangadi. He had only moved in 14 years earlier. So, according to Nair, there was not class revolt he was handling. It was a Khilafat edifice prepared and passed from distant Karachi, possibly controlled by spiritual leaders of Islam.

The Khilafat movement was introduced into the district of Malabar on 28 April 1920, by a Resolution at the Malabar District Conference, held at Manjeri, the headquarters of Ernad Taluk. On 30 March 1921, there was a meeting at which one Abdulla Kutti Musaliar of Vayakkad lectured on Khilafat, in Kizhakoth Amsom, Calicut Taluk. And at a second meeting held the next day at Pannur Mosque, there was some unpleasantness between the Mappilas on one side, and Nairs and Tiyyar, who resented the Khilafat meeting, on the other. The Mappilas mustered the strength to attack the place of worship belonging to the Hindu Adhigari of the village.

=== Nature of attacks ===
The Malabar Rebellion witnessed many attacks on British officers in the region. The Madras High Court, which adjudicated in this matter, had passed judgements on each of the cases against the various Mappila rioters who were captured. The Madras High Court said on the matter,

It appears also that on the night of the 20th of August, at Nilambur 16 miles from Manjeri a police constable at Edavanna, were murdered and at Tiruvangadi in addition to Mr. Rowley and Lieutenant Johnston nine other persons were murdered. The police station at Manjeri was attacked on the night of the 21st; public officers at Manjeri on the 22nd. On the 24th of August Variyamkunnath Kunhahammad Haji who is described as the rebel leader arrived at Manjeri. All these incidents had occurred when the respondent made the speech already referred to, and it was in such dangerous surroundings that he made it and the reference to Tiruvangadi in that speech has a consequence, a particular significance. Subsequent events are that on the 26th of August a retired police inspector was murdered at Anakayam near Manjeri by Variyamkunnath Kunhahammad Haji and his followers and on the 25th of August his head was paraded on a spear; and it was common ground that the respondent was at Manjeri from the morning of the 21st of August until the 30th of August.

The District Magistrate stated that reliable information had been received about 180 forced conversions of Hindus and the actual total may run into thousands. Roland E. Miller estimates forced conversions as in the range of 200 and 2500. In the aftermath of this violence, the Suddhi Movement was created by the Arya Samaj. They converted over 2,000 Hindus who had been forcibly converted to Islam by the Mappilas. Sumit Sarkar in Modern India quotes an Arya Samaj source that claimed about 600 Hindus were killed and 2,500 forcibly converted during the rebellion. Variyankunnath Kunjahammad Haji claimed to have killed the alleged British agents and spies responsible for the forced conversion of Hindus to Mohammadanism and killing others. However, their leader, Swami Shraddhananda was stabbed on 23 December 1926 by an Islamist at his Ashram. Some newspapers reported that certain districts were 'empty of Hindus.'

=== Punishments of rebel leaders ===
The following were the various leaders of the movement, who were sentenced to death following the Malabar Rebellion:

- Ali Musliyar, leader of the rebellion
- Kunhi Kadir, Khilafat Secretary, Tanur
- Variankunnath Kunhammad Haji
- Kunhj Koya, Thangal, President of the Khilafat Committee, Malappuram
- Koya Tangal of Kumaramputhur, Governor of a Khilafat principality
- Chembrasseri Imbichi Koya Thangal, notorious for his alleged killing of 38 men by slashing their necks and throwing them into a well
- Palakamthodi Avvocker Musaliar
- Konnara Mohammed Koya Thangal

== Timeline of events ==
=== Nagpur Resolution of Congress ===
The Khilafat Committee in Nagpur (in January 1921) headed by Syed of Ponnani Juma Masjid extended full support for the Nagpur Resolution of Congress that called for non-cooperation. Syed was the highest religious authorities for the Moplahs and called for complete support of non-cooperation. However Gandhi's tenet of non-violence was not accepted by the committee.

=== Conference of Gandhi & Ali Brothers ===
In April 1921 a conference attended by Gandhi and Ali Brothers in Madras was attended in large numbers by Moplahs. Maulana Muhammad Ali of Ali Brothers made a statement that "if the Afghans invaded Bharat to evict the British, he would support them and fight the British and anyone else who opposed the Afghan invasion".

=== Dispute between Nilambur Raja and V. Mohammad ===
A dispute between Nilambur Raja (a Namboodiri landlord) and V. Mohammad (a Moplah Khilafatist) in July 1921 lead to a police search of V. Mohammad. The situation escalated when hundreds of Moplahs and Khilaftists marched towards Raja's home carrying war knives, swords, and other weapons. The mob was dispersed after the intervention of Khilafat Committee of Malappuram.

=== Request for Reinforcement by District Collector ===
District Collector E. F. Thomas request reinforcements of British Troop stating "it is with the deepest regret, that I inform Government that the situation is beyond the District officials". The Governor of Madras wrote to Viceroy of India stating that "speeches on the Khilafat question combined with the resolutions of the recent All-India Khilafat Conference at Karachi have produced an impression on the mind of the Mappilla that the end of the British Raj is at hand".

== Rebellion and response ==
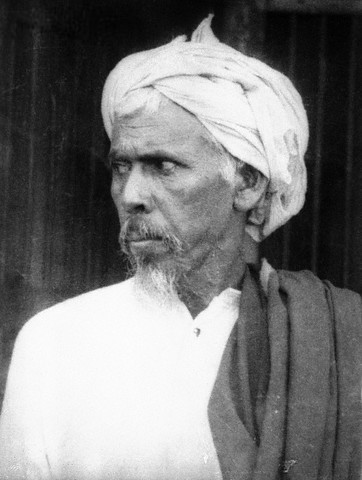
Ali Musliyar photographed during the uprising.

On 1 August 1921, the police attempted to arrest Vadakkevittil Muhammed, the secretary of the Khilafat Committee of Ernad at Pookkottur, alleging that he had stolen the pistol of a Hindu Thirumulpad from a Kovilakam (manor) in Nilambur. A crowd of 2,000 Mappilas from the neighbourhood foiled the attempt. On 20 August 1921, a squad of police arrested a number of Khilafat volunteers and seized records at the Mambaram Mosque in Tirurangadi, leading to rumours that the building had been desecrated. A large crowd of Mappilas converged on Tirurangadi and besieged the local police station. The police opened fire on the crowd, triggering a furious reaction which soon engulfed the Eranad and Valluvanad Taluks along with neighbouring areas and continued for over two months.

Following the mosque incident, the rebels attacked and seized police stations, government treasuries, and entered the courts and registry offices where they destroyed records. Some even climbed into the judges' seats and proclaimed the advent of swaraj (self-rule). The rebellion soon spread to the neighbouring areas of Malappuram, Manjeri, Perinthalmanna, Pandikkad and Tirur under principal leaders Variankunnath Kunjahammad Haji, Seethi Koya Thangal of Kumaranpathor and Ali Musliyar. On 25 August, the rebels declared independence from British India, forming an independent state known as the Malayala Rajyam. Led by Variyankunnath Kunjahammad Haji, the state adopted its own passport, currency and taxation system. By 28 August 1921 colonial rule had virtually come to an end in Malappuram, Tirurangadi, Manjeri, and Perinthalmanna, which then fell into the hands of the rebels who established complete domination over the Eranad and Valluvanad Taluks. On 24 August 1921 Variankunnath Kunjahammad Haji took over command of the rebellion from Ali Musliyar. Public proclamations were issued by Variyankunnath and Seethi that those Mappilas who resorted to looting would receive exemplary punishments.

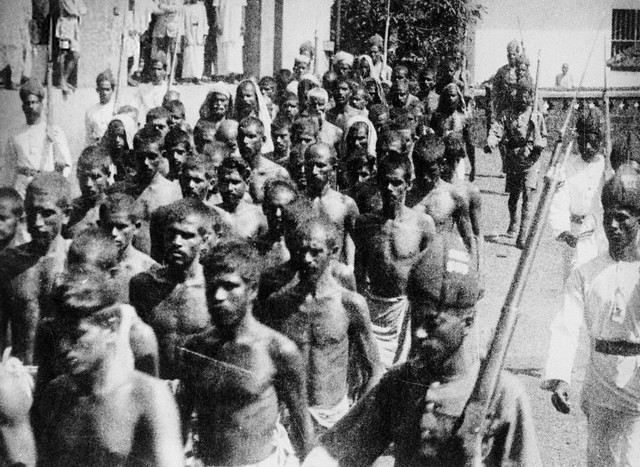
Captured Mappila prisoners taken after a battle with the colonial army.

During the initial stages of the rebellion, the colonial military and police were forced to withdraw from these areas but by the end of August, several contingents of colonial troops and Gurkha arrived. Clashes with the rebels followed, one of the most notable encounters taking place at Pookkottur (often referred to as the Battle of Pookkottur) in which colonial troops sustained heavy casualties and had to retreat to safety.

During the early phase of the rebellion, the targets were primarily the Jenmi and the colonial government. Crimes committed by some of the rebels were accepted by leaders. After the proclamation of martial law and the arrival of government troops, when some members of the Hindu community were enlisted by the army to provide information on the rebels. It is alleged that once they had eliminated the minimal presence of the government, the Mappilas turned their full attention to attacking Hindus while Ernad and Valluvanad were declared "Khilafat kingdoms". During the rebellion, a Mappila gang under the leadership of Odayappurath Chekkutty from Kalpakanchery protected the Kizhake Kovilakam (a seat of the ruling family of the Zamorin of Calicut) and the Arya Vaidya Sala at Kottakkal. Vaidyaratnam P. S. Warrier, who is also the founder of renowned Arya Vaidya Sala and Kottakkal Natya Sangham at Kottakkal, provided the entire shelter and protection for the orphaned Mappila families when the British started to arrest Mappila household men.

By the end of 1921, the situation was brought under control. The colonial government raised a special quasi-military (or Armed Police) battalion, the Malabar Special Police, initially consisting of non-Muslims and trained by the colonial army. The Special Police then engaged the rioters and eventually put an end to the riot.

== Reactions and aftermath ==
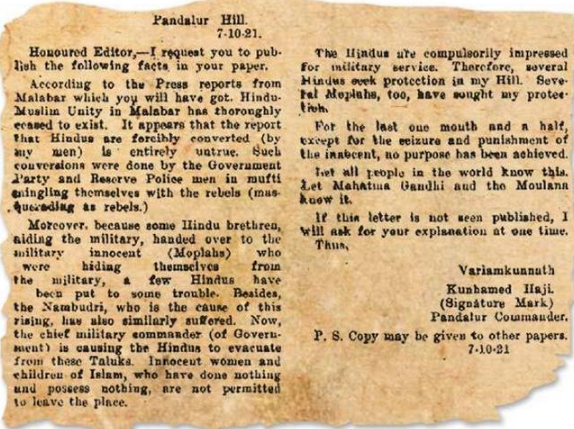
A letter written by Variyankunnath Kunjahammad Haji which appeared in the newspaper The Hindu on 18 October 1921

Different people including Variyankunnath Kunjahammad Haji criticised the atrocities against Hindus in the name of the movement, which Variyankunnath Kunjahammad Haji said were part of the British plot. Variyankunnath Kunjahammad Haji also states to have killed the British agents and spies responsible for this.

=== Message to Friends of Freedom for India ===
On 7 December 1921 two American newspapers Detroit Free Press and The Baltimore Sun reported the message received by the Friends of Freedom for India from Variyankunnath Kunjahammad Haji in a cablegram. Newspapers reports the message was preceded by the following sentence: "Charges that the Moplahs of Malabar have put to death many Hindus and forcibly converted others to Mohammedanism were denied and characterized as part of a British plot to discredit the Moplah movement of India's independence in a cablegram from Variyankunnath Kunjahammad Haji..."

In the message he said:

"A few cases of conversion of our Hindu brethren have been reported to me." the message said. "But after proper investigation we discovered the real plot. The vandals that were guilty of this crime were members of the British reserve police and British intelligence department, and they joined our forces as patriots to do such filthy work only to discredit our soldiers. There are Christians, Hindus and Moplahs amongst these British agents and spies. They have decidedly been put to death.

"We are at war with England. We are fighting for the independence of India, and we are doing exactly what the Americans did to free America from British domination. So anyone giving aid and comfort to the enemy will be se verely dealt with, irrespective of social position or religious affiliation.

"Let the great people of the great land of Washington postpone judgment until they have a chance to know the full truth about the present war in Malabar."

B. R. Ambedkar, who advocated for the formation of Pakistan in his book Pakistan or the Partition of India (1945), wrote on the rebellion:

The blood-curdling atrocities committed by the Moplas in Malabar against the Hindus were indescribable. All over Southern India, a wave of horrified feeling had spread among the Hindus of every shade of opinion, which was intensified when certain Khilafat leaders were so misguided as to pass resolutions of congratulations to the Moplas on the brave fight they were conducting for the sake of religion". Any person could have said that this was too heavy a price for Hindu-Muslim unity. But Mr. Gandhi was so much obsessed by the necessity of establishing Hindu-Muslim unity that he was prepared to make light of the doings of the Moplas and the Khilafats who were congratulating them. He spoke of the Mappilas as the "brave God-fearing Moplahs who were fighting for what they consider as religion and in a manner which they consider as religious ".

Annie Besant, who wanted dominion status for India, opposed the non-cooperation movement, supported the Montague-Chelmsford reforms, who had adverse effect on her popularity due to difference of opinion and later left the political field, recounts in two separate articles in New India on 29 November 1921 and 6 December 1921 as to what happened to the Malabar Hindus at the hands of the Moplahs:

Mr. Gandhi...can he not feel a little sympathy for thousands of women left with only rags, driven from home, for little children born of the flying mothers on roads in refuge camps? The misery is beyond description. Girl wives, pretty and sweet, with eyes half blind with weeping, distraught with terror; women who have seen their husbands hacked to pieces before their eye, in the way "Moplas consider as religious"; old women tottering, whose faces become written with anguish and who cry at a gentle touch...men who have lost all, hopeless, crushed, desperate...Can you conceive of a more ghastly and inhuman crime than the murders of babies and pregnant women?...A pregnant woman carrying 7 months was cut through the abdomen by a rebel and she was seen lying dead on the way with the dead child projecting out of the womb...Another: a baby of six months was snatched away from the breast of his own mother and cut into two pieces... Are these rebels human beings or monsters?

A respectable Nayar Lady at Melatur was stripped naked by the rebels in the presence of her husband and brothers, who were made to stand close by with their hands tied behind. When they shut their eyes in abhorrence they were compelled at the point of sword to open their eyes and witness the rape committed by the brute in their presence.

Annie Besant, who once led a walk out in the fifth District Conference held at Manjeri, Ernad taluk after the Montagu–Chelmsford Reforms was opposed in overwhelming support in a resolution in the conference, said on the rebellion:

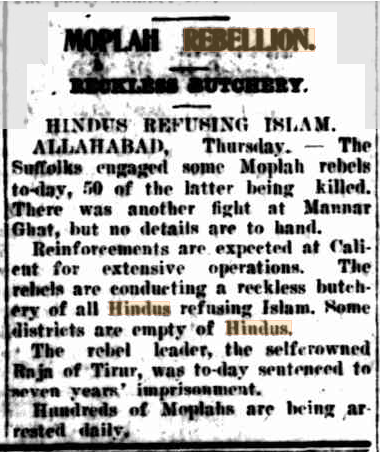
The Advocate (Tasmania), newspaper report on Malabar rebellion, 8 October 1921

"They established the Khilafat Raj, crowned a King, murdered and plundered abundantly, and killed or drove away all Hindus who would not apostatise. Somewhere about a lakh people were driven from their homes with nothing but the clothes they had on, stripped of everything."

Here is the text of Resolution No. 3 of the Ahmedabad session of the INC, where Mahatma Gandhi was appointed as its sole executive authority, on 24 December 1921, in connection with the Moplah Riots:

The Congress expresses its firm conviction that the Moplah disturbance was not due to the Non-Co-operation or the Khilafat movement, especially as the...Khilafat preachers were denied access to the affected parts by the District authorities for six months before the disturbance, but is due to causes wholly unconnected with the two movements and that the outbreak would not have occurred had the message of non-violence been allowed to reach them. Nevertheless, this Congress...is of the opinion that the...disturbance in Malabar could have been prevented by the Government of Madras accepting the proffered assistance of Maulana Yakub Hassan...

Here the rebuttal of D.V. Gundappa to INC's statement:

We need not...consider the propriety of the blameless [Congress]. We are concerned chiefly with the spirit in which the Congress viewed...responsibility. Firstly, is the period of six months the maximum term for which the seeds of disaffection sown into the mind of a notoriously fanatical population could remain potential? Is it not possible to argue...that the preaching done before six months must have been remarkably good if it could take so fierce...a form in so short a time? ... if the message of non-violence was not allowed to reach the Moplahs, was any other message allowed to reach them? And who delivered it? Thirdly, if it is claimed...that...non-violence can quell any kind of armed rising, does it not follow that it should have been conveyed five years ago to England and France and Germany? On the other hand, if the claim...[is that]...non-violence can succeed only with a people in religious frenzy, are not those who first put them in such frenzy answerable to those who suffer its consequences?

Swami Shraddhanand in the Liberator of 26 August 1926:

The original resolution condemned the Moplas wholesale for the killing of Hindus and burning of Hindu homes and the forcible conversion to Islam. The Hindu members themselves proposed amendments till it was reduced to condemning only certain individuals who had been guilty of the above crimes. But some of the Moslem leaders could not bear this even. Maulana Fakir and other Maulanas, of course, opposed the resolution and there was no wonder. But I was surprised, an out-and-out Nationalist like Maulana Hasrat Mohani opposed the resolution on the ground that the Mopla country no longer remained Dar-ul-Aman but became Dar-ul-Harab and they suspected the Hindus of collusion with the British enemies of the Moplas. Therefore, the Moplas were right in presenting the Quran or sword to the Hindus. And if the Hindus became Mussalmans to save themselves from death, it was a voluntary change of faith and not forcible conversion—Well, even the harmless resolution condemning some of the Moplas was not unanimously passed but had to be accepted by a majority of votes only.

The Viceroy, Lord Reading:

Their wanton and unprovoked attack on the Hindus, the all but wholesale looting of their houses in Ernad, etc, the forcible conversion of Hindus in the beginning of the Moplah rebellion and the wholesale conversion of those who stuck to their homes in later stages, the brutal murder of inoffensive Hindus without the slightest reason except that they are "Kafirs" or belonged to the same religion as the policemen, who their mosques, burning of Hindu temples, the outrage on Hindu women and their forcible conversion and marriage by the Moplahs.

The Rani of Nilambur in a petition to Lady Reading:

But it is possible that your Ladyship is not fully apprised of all the horrors and atrocities perpetrated by the fiendish rebels; of the many wells and tanks filled up with the mutilated, but often only half dead bodies of our nearest and dearest ones who refused to abandon the faith of our fathers;of pregnant women cut to pieces and left on the roadsides and in the jungles, with the unborn babe protruding from the mangled corpse; of our innocent and helpless children torn from our arms and done to death before our eyes and of our husbands and fathers tortured, flayed and burnt alive; of our hapless sisters forcibly carried away from the midst of kith and kin and subjected to every shame and outrage which the vile and brutal imagination of these inhuman hell-hounds could conceive of; of thousands of our homesteads reduced to cinder-mounds out of sheer savagery and a wanton spirit of destruction; of our places of worship desecrated and destroyed and of the images of the deity shamefully insulted by putting the entrails of slaughtered cows where flower garlands used to lie or else smashed to pieces; of the wholesale looting of hard-earned wealth of generations reducing many who were formerly rich and prosperous to publicly beg for a piece or two in the streets of Calicut, to buy salt or chilly or betel-leaf - rice being mercifully provided by the various relief agencies.

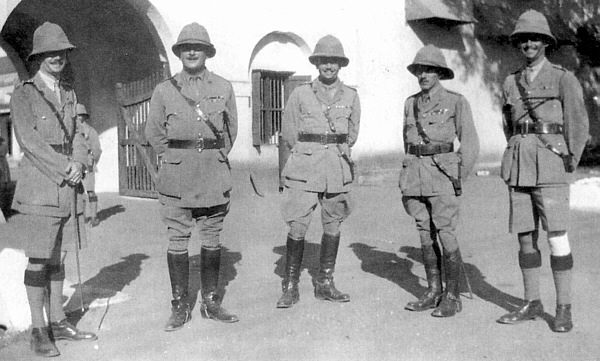
Second Dorsets to deploy from Bangalore to Malabar in 1921

A conference held at Calicut presided over by the Zamorin of Calicut, the Ruler of Malabar issued a resolution:

"That the conference views with indignation and sorrow the attempts made at various quarters by interested parties to ignore or minimise the crimes committed by the rebels such as: brutally dishonouring women, flaying people alive, wholesale slaughter of men, women, and children, burning alive entire families, forcibly converting people in thousands and slaying those who refused to get converted, throwing half-dead people into wells and leaving the victims to struggle for escape till finally released from their suffering by death, burning a great many and looting practically all Hindu and Christian houses in the disturbed areas in which even Moplah women and children took part and robbed women of even the garments on their bodies, in short reducing the whole non-Muslim population to abject destitution, cruelly insulting the religious sentiments of the Hindus by desecrating and destroying numerous temples in the disturbed areas, killing cows within the temple precincts putting their entrails on the holy image and hanging skulls on the walls and the roofs."

K. P. Kesava Menon, who was the grandson of the Maharaja of Palakkad, and had been a part of the Khilafat movement said:

"There is no doubt regarding the genesis of the rebellion in 1921. It was born out of police repression. Its chief cause was the excessive violence used by the authorities to suppress the Khilafat Movement, and not any Jenmi-Kudiyan conflict, or dispute regarding the mosque. When police atrocities became unbearable, they gave up the vow of non-violence, and decided to meet the violence (by the British police) with violence itself."

The English translation of the letter written to the newspaper The Hindu by Variyankunnath Kunjahammad Haji, as appeared in the newspaper on 18 October 1921:

"Honoured Editor, I request you to publish the following facts in your paper. According to the Press Reports from Malabar which you will have got, Hindu-Muslim Unity in Malabar has thoroughly ceased to exist. It appears that the report that Hindus are forcibly converted (by any men) is entirely untrue. Such conversions were done by the Government Party and Reserve Policemen in mufti mingling themselves with the rebels (masquerading as rebels.) Moreover, because some Hindu brethren, aiding the military, handed over to the military innocent (Moplahs) who were hiding from the military, a few Hindus have been put to some trouble. Besides, the Nambudiri, who is the cause of this rising, has also similarly suffered. The Hindus are compulsorily impressed for military service. Therefore, several Hindus seek protection in my Hill. Several Moplahs, too, have sought my protection. Now the chief military commander [of the government] is causing Hindus to evacuate from these Taluks. Innocent women and children of Islam, who have done nothing and possess nothing, are not permitted to leave the place. The Hindus are compulsorily impressed for military service. Therefore, several Hindus seek protection in my hill. Several Moplahs, too, have sought my protection. For the last one month and a half, except for the seizure and punishment of the innocent, no purpose has been achieved. Let all the people in the world know this. Let Mahatma Gandhi and Moulana know it. If this letter is not seen published, I will ask your explanation at one time."

Rashtriya Swayamsevak Sangh was formed by K. B. Hedgewar in the aftermath of the Hindu-Muslim riots during Khilafat Movement and particularly due to those during Moplah Riots.

== Wagon Tragedy ==
On 10 November 1921 when the uprising was near its end, almost 100 detained Muslim prisoners were sent by train from Tirur to the Central Prison, Coimbatore in the Madras Presidency. 64 of the 100 prisoners suffocated to death in the closed railroad wagon. Few Hindus also include in the 70 people killed due to the Wagon Tragedy.

== Statistics ==
Name of Taluka	Corresponding Present-day Taluks (approximate)	Total population (1921)	Muslim population (1921) (Before rebellion)	Percent	Hindu population (1921)	Percent
Thalassery Revenue Division
Chirakkal	Payyanur, Taliparamba, and Kannur	346,345	87,337	25.22	254,980	73.62
Kottayam	Thalassery and Iritty	232,285	55,146	23.74	175,048	75.36
Wayanad	Mananthavady, Sulthan Bathery, and Kalpetta	84,771	14,252	16.81	67,845	80.03
Kozhikode Revenue Division
Kurumbranad	Vatakara and Koyilandy	356,907	96,463	27.03	259,799	72.80
Calicut	Kozhikode and Thamarassery	300,211	88,393	29.44	196,435	65.43
Malappuram Revenue Division
Eranad	Nilambur, Eranad, Kondotty, and Tirurangadi	401,101	237,402	59.19	163,328	40.72
Walluvanad	Perinthalmanna, Mannarkkad, and Ottapalam	394,517	133,919	33.95	259,979	65.90
Palakkad Revenue Division
Ponnani	Tirur, Ponnani, Pattambi, and Chavakkad	533,252	229,016	42.95	281,155	52.72
Palghat	Palakkad, Alathur, and Chittur	427,015	47,946	11.23	315,432	73.87
Fort Cochin Revenue Division
Cochin		22,417	4,999	22.30	7,318	32.64
Total		3,098,871	1,004,327	32.41	2,039,339	65.81

According to official records, the colonial government lost 43 troops with 126 wounded, while 2337 rebels were killed, another 1652 injured and 45,404 imprisoned. Unofficial estimates put the number at 10,000 civilian deaths, 50,000 imprisoned, of who 20,000 were deported (mainly to the penal colony in the Andaman Islands) while around 1,000 went missing. The number of civilian casualties is estimated at between 10,000 and 12,000.

Lord Curzon's statement given in the British parliament was that, "The Moplah rebellion is just over, but at least 2,500 Moplahs have been killed by our troops, at least 1,000 Hindus were murdered, and at least 1,000 more were forcibly converted to Mahommedanism. Temples and churches were defiled and damaged, and property to the value of £250,000 was destroyed."

Within five years subsequent to the conflict the agricultural output was averaging slightly more than prior to it. Qureshi has said that, "In short, contrary to popular belief, Malabar did not suffer massive devastation, and even if it did the recovery was miraculous."

== Popular culture ==
Renowned author Uroob's masterpiece novel Sundarikalum Sundaranmarum (The Beautiful and the Handsome) is set in the backdrops of Malabar Rebellion. The novel has about thirty characters belonging to three generations of eight families belonging to Malabar during the end of the Second World War. Sundarikalum Sundaranmarum won the Kendra Sahitya Akademi Award, India's most prestigious literary award, in 1960. It also received the Asan Centenary Award in 1973, a special award given by the Kerala Sahitya Akademi for the most outstanding work since Independence.

The 1988 Malayalam film 1921, directed by I. V. Sasi and written by T. Damodaran, depicts the events of the rebellion. The film stars Mammootty as Khadir, a retired Mappila soldier, alongside Madhu as Ali Musliyar. The film won the Kerala State Film Award for Best Film with Popular Appeal and Aesthetic Value in the same year. The 2023 film 1921: Puzha Muthal Puzha Vare was based on the riots and Variyankunnath Kunjahammad Haji, written and directed by Ramasimhan. Thalaivasal Vijay portrayed Haji.

The rebellion also spawned a large number of Mappila Songs. Many of these describe the events surrounding the Khilafat movement in Malabar and offer a view of conditions in the area at the time. Ahmed Kutty composed the Malabar Lahala Enna Khilafat Patt in 1925, which describes the events of the rebellion. Many of rebel prisoners such as Tannirkode Ossankoya composed songs in their letters to relatives.

== Monuments ==
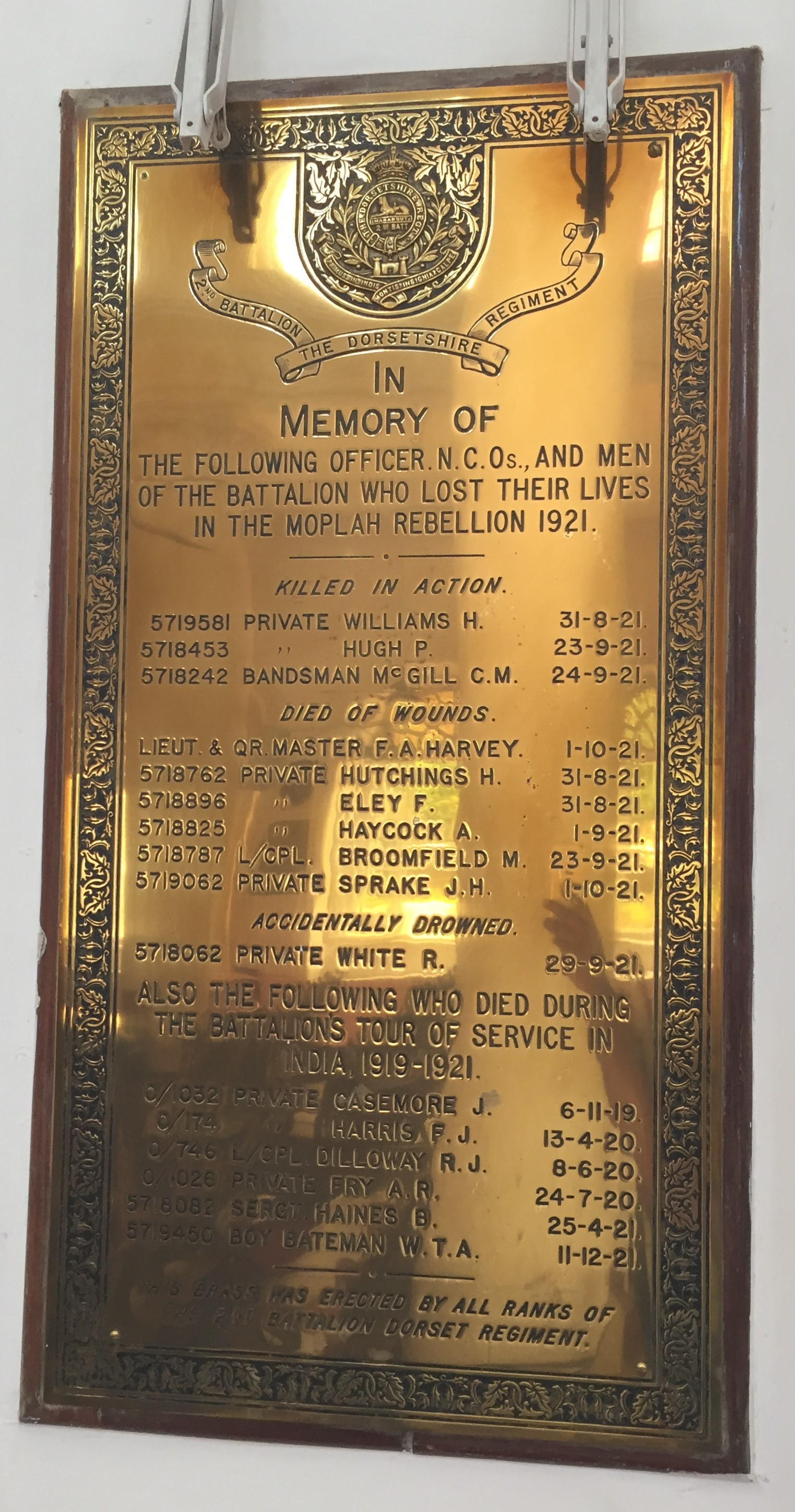
Memorial for the Officers and Men of the Dorset Regiment, who died in the Moplah Revolt, at the St. Mark's Cathedral, Bangalore

The officers and men from the Dorset Regiment who died while taking part in the suppression of the revolt are commemorated in a brass tablet at the St. Mark's Cathedral, Bangalore.

The Variyankunnath Kunjahammad Haji Memorial Town Hall in Malappuram Municipality is named after the leader of the rebellion, while the Tirur Wagon Tragedy Memorial Town Hall commemorates the eponymous incident. The Pookkottur War Memorial Gate is dedicated to those killed in the Pookkottur battle.

Along with these monuments, abandoned graves of British officers who died during the rebellion can be seen in Malabar. This includes that of Private F. M. Eley, Private H. C. Hutchings (both died of wounds received in action against the Mappilas at Tirurangadi on 22 July 1921), William John Duncan Rowley (Assistant Suprededent of Police, Palghat, killed at Tirurangadi by a mob of Mappilas at the outbreak of the rebellion on 20 August 1921 – aged 28).

== See also ==
- Murder of Collector Connolly
- Khilafat Movement
- 1914 Ottoman jihad proclamation
- Malabar Special Police
- Freeman Freeman-Thomas, 1st Marquess of Willingdon
- John Burnett-Stuart
- Dorset Regiment
- List of massacres in India
