= Araku Valley Assembly constituency =

Constituency of the Andhra Pradesh Legislative Assembly, India

Coordinates: 18.33°N 82.88°E

Araku Valley
- Constituency No. 28 for the Andhra Pradesh Legislative Assembly
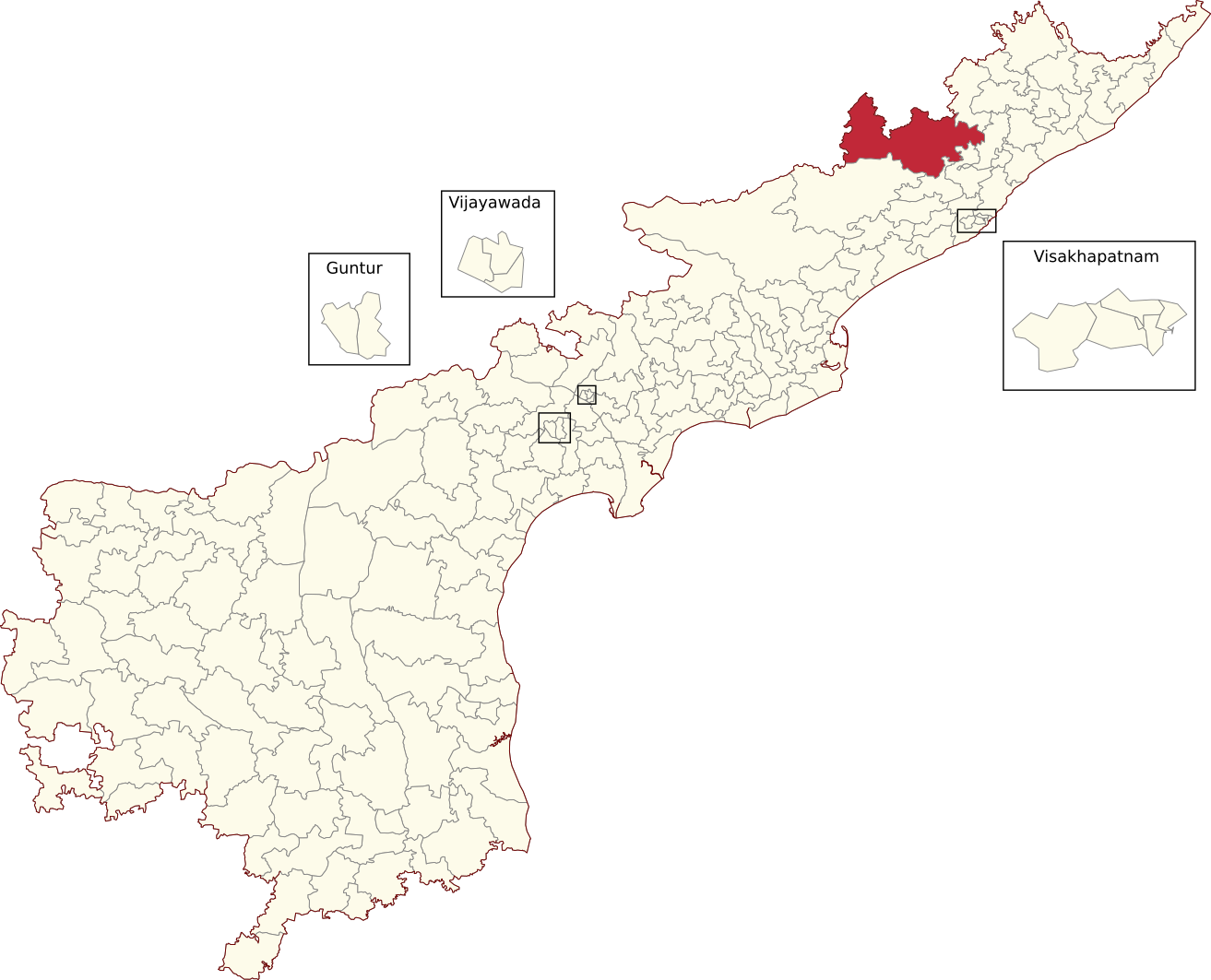
- Location of Araku Valley Assembly constituency within Andhra Pradesh

Constituency details
- Country: India
- Region: South India
- State: Andhra Pradesh
- District: Alluri Sitharama Raju
- Lok Sabha constituency: Araku
- Established: 2008
- Total electors: 220,773
- Reservation: ST

Member of Legislative Assembly
- 16th Andhra Pradesh Legislative Assembly
- Incumbent Regam Matyalingam
- Party: YSRCP
- Elected year: 2024

Araku Valley is a Scheduled Tribe reserved constituency in Alluri Sitharama Raju district of Andhra Pradesh that elects representatives to the Andhra Pradesh Legislative Assembly in India. It is one of the seven assembly segments of Araku Lok Sabha constituency.

Regam Matyalingam is the current MLA of the constituency, having won the 2024 Andhra Pradesh Legislative Assembly election from YSR Congress Party. As of 2019, there are a total of 220,773 electors in the constituency. The constituency was established in 2008, as per the Delimitation Orders (2008).

== Mandals ==
Mandals in Araku Valley Assembly Constituency

The six mandals that form the assembly constituency are:

Mandal
Munchingi Puttu
Peda Bayalu
Dumbriguda
Araku Valley
Hukumpeta
Ananthagiri

== Members of the Legislative Assembly ==
Year	Member	Political party
2009	Siveri Soma	Telugu Desam Party
2014	Kidari Sarveswara Rao	YSR Congress Party
2019	Chetti Palguna	YSR Congress Party
2024	Regam Matyalingam	YSR Congress Party

== Election results ==
Vote share of Winning candidates
2024	36.71%
2019	33.70%
2014	42.44%
2009	29.04%

=== 2024 ===
2024 Andhra Pradesh Legislative Assembly election: Araku Valley
Party	Candidate	Votes	%	±%
YSRCP	Regam Matyalingam	65,658	36.71	▲3.01
BJP	Rajarao Pangi	33,781	18.89	▲15.79
IND	Vanthala Ramanna	13,555	7.58	
BSP	Lake Rajarao	13,506	7.55	
INC	Gangadharaswami Setty	12,503	6.99	▲5.37
IND	Abraham Siveri	11,633	6.50	
IND	Raghunadh Samardi	10,737	6.00	
NOTA	None of the Above	3,593	2.01	▼4.45
IND	Mosiya Sujatha	2,116	1.18	
IND	5 Independent Candidates	6,611	3.70	
OTH	4 Other Party Candidates	5,159	2.88	
Majority		31,877	17.82	▲1.67
Turnout		178,852	72.82	▲1.48
YSRCP hold		Swing		

=== 2019 ===
2019 Andhra Pradesh Legislative Assembly election: Araku Valley
Party	Candidate	Votes	%	±%
YSRCP	Chetti Palguna	53,101	33.70	▼8.74
IND	Donnu Dora Siyyari	27,660	17.55	
TDP	Kidari Sravan Kumar	19,929	12.65	▼7.10
IND	P. Raja Rao	10,875	6.90	
CPI(M)	Surendra Killo	10,455	6.63	▲0.61
NOTA	None of the Above	10,177	6.46	▲3.17
IND	Surya Narayana Jarsingi	9,980	6.33	
BJP	Adapa Bonju Naidu	4,887	3.10	
IND	Vengada Anil Kumar Majji	4,422	2.81	
INC	Pachipenta Santha Kumari	2,546	1.62	▼0.69
OTH	2 Other Party Candidates	3,543	2.25	
Majority		25,441	16.15	▼6.54
Turnout		157,575	71.34	▲1.23
YSRCP hold		Swing		

=== 2014 ===
2014 Andhra Pradesh Legislative Assembly election: Araku Valley (ST)
Party	Candidate	Votes	%	±%
YSRCP	Kidari Sarveswara Rao	63,700	42.44	
TDP	Siveri Soma	29,647	19.75	▼9.29
IND	Ravibabu Kumbha	25,789	17.18	
CPI(M)	Killo Surendra	9,032	6.02	
NOTA	None of the Above	4,933	3.29	
BSP	Lake Raja Rao	4,398	2.93	▼8.12
INC	Mattam Malleswara Padal	3,465	2.31	▼26.40
IND	Penumala Ranjitkumar	2,408	1.60	
IND	Devid Buridi	2,047	1.36	
JSP	Vampuru Gangulayya	1,712	1.14	
AAP	Korra Rajeshkumar	1,584	1.06	
IND	Nikkula Simhachalam	1,394	0.93	
Majority		34,053	22.69	▲22.36
Turnout		150,109	70.11	
Swing to YSRCP from TDP		Swing		

=== 2009 ===
2009 Andhra Pradesh Legislative Assembly election: Araku Valley (ST)
Party	Candidate	Votes	%	±%
TDP	Siveri Soma	34,959	29.04	
INC	Vanjangi Kanthamma	34,557	28.71	
IND	Gangadhara Swamy Setti	19,165	15.92	
BSP	Pangi Raja Rao	13,302	11.05	
PRP	Mandi Jayavathi	8,101	6.73	
BJP	Raghunadh Samardi	3,920	3.26	
LSP	Baka Manikyamma	3,464	2.88	
IND	Kumbha Ravibabu	2,916	2.42	
Majority		402	0.33	
Turnout		120,384		
TDP win (new seat)				

== See also ==
- List of constituencies of the Andhra Pradesh Legislative Assembly
