= Vizagapatam Hill Tracts Agency =

The Vizagapatam Hill Tracts Agency was an agency in the Madras Presidency of British India. The agency was autonomous and supervised by an agent subordinate to the District Collector of Vizagapatam District.

== History ==
The agency was created soon after the Ghumusar Rebellion of 1835 based on the recommendations of the Russell Report of 18 November 1834. As per the recommendations, the zamindars of the hill regions of the north-eastern part of the Madras Presidency were given more autonomy than those of other districts. However, the general administration of the country was to be overseen by a commissioner or agent subordinate to the District Collector of Vizagapatam. The proposals were approved by the Madras government and agencies were eventually created by Act XXIV of 1839.

== Extent ==
The agency controlled the affairs of the zamindari estates of Vizianagaram, Bobbili, Palakonda, Golgonda, Jeypore, Kurupam, Sangamvalasa, Chemudu, Panchipenta, Salur, Madgole, Belgam, Sarvapilly and Merangi and made up seven-eights of Vizagapatam district.

The territories of the Vizagapatam Hill Tracts Agency lie in the present-day Araku Valley, Golugonda, Chintapalle, Dumbriguda, Gangaraju Madugula, Gudem Kotha Veedhi, Hukumpeta, Koyyuru, Peda Bayalu and Munchingi Puttu mandals of Visakhapatnam district and Ramabhadrapuram, Gajapathinagaram, Salur, Seethanagaram, Parvathipuram, Kurupam, Badangi, Garugubilli, Mentada, Pachipenta, Makkuva, Balijipeta and Bobbili mandals of Vizianagaram district of Andhra Pradesh and Malkangiri, Koraput, Rayagada and Nabarangapur districts of Odisha.

== See also ==
- Ganjam Hill Tracts Agency
