= Palguna =

Palguna may refer to:

- Chetti Palguna (born 1963), Indian politician
- Tanaecia palguna, a butterfly species
