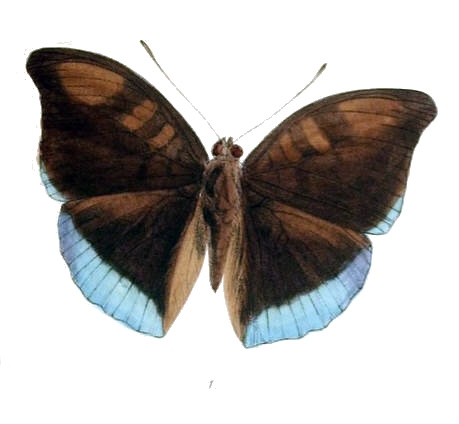

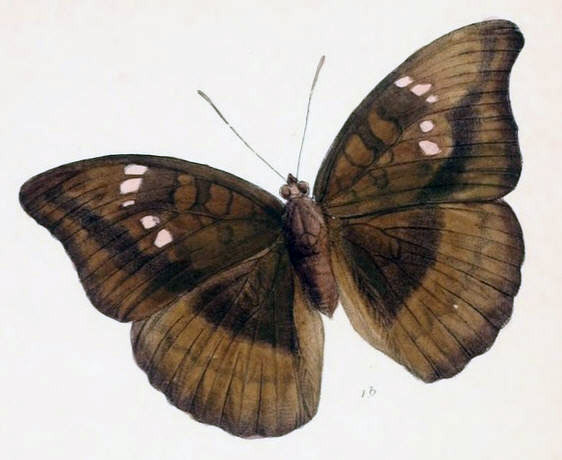

Scientific classification
- Domain: Eukaryota
- Kingdom: Animalia
- Phylum: Arthropoda
- Class: Insecta
- Order: Lepidoptera
- Family: Nymphalidae
- Genus: Euthalia
- Species: E. telchinia

Binomial name
- Euthalia telchinia (Ménétriés, 1857)

= Euthalia telchinia =

Blue baron

Species of butterfly

Euthalia telchinia, the blue baron, is a species of nymphalid butterfly found in South and Southeast Asia. It was first described by Édouard Ménétries in 1857.

It is found in Sikkim, Assam to Myanmar, Thailand, and Laos. This species is historically known in the Western Ghats from a single verified record from Sampaje Ghat in Dakshina Kannada (Yates 1931). Several more unconfirmed records have been subsequently reported (Larsen 1987). But no new records after that.

== Description ==
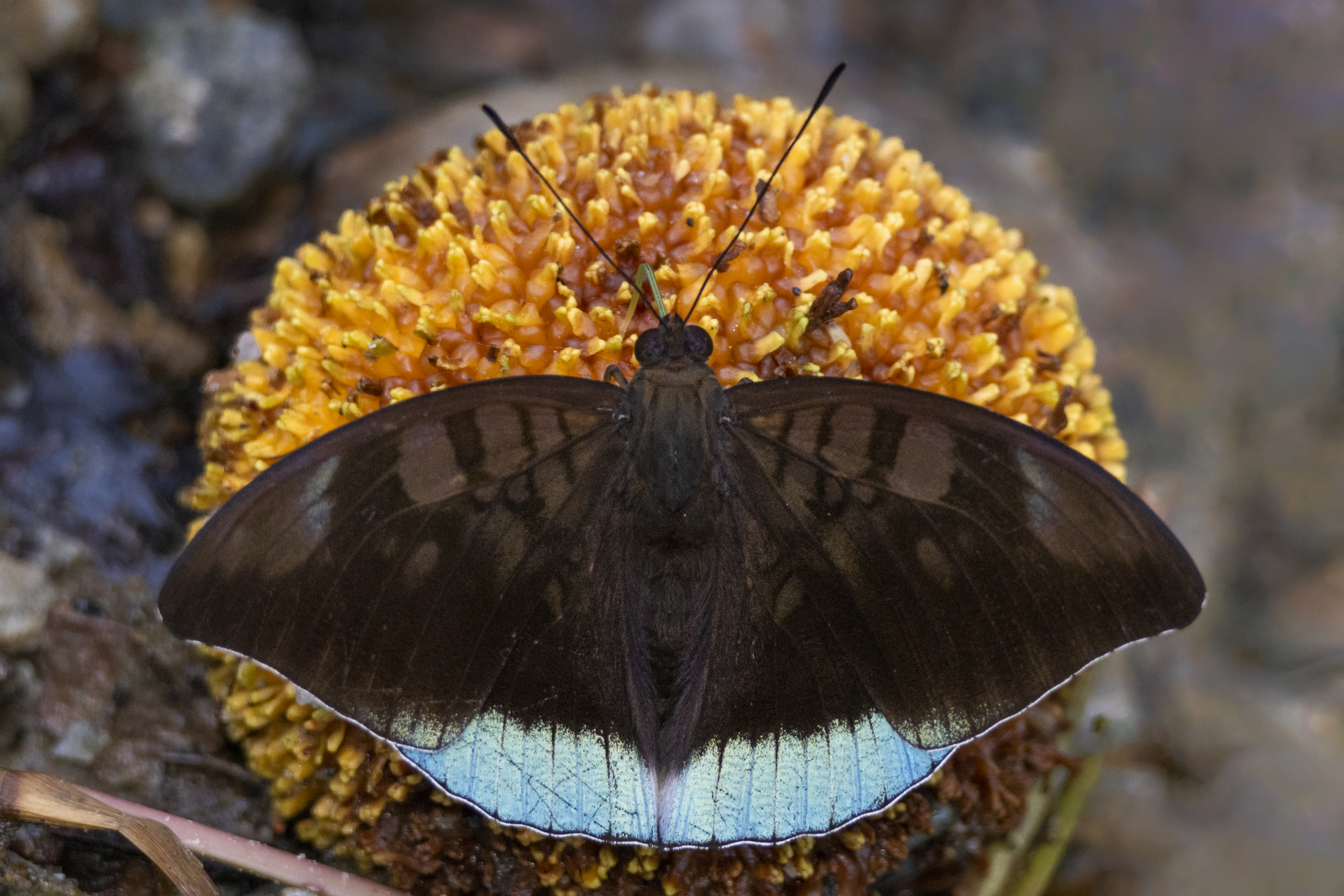
Euthalia telchinia (Ménétriés, 1857) - Blue Baron (Male)

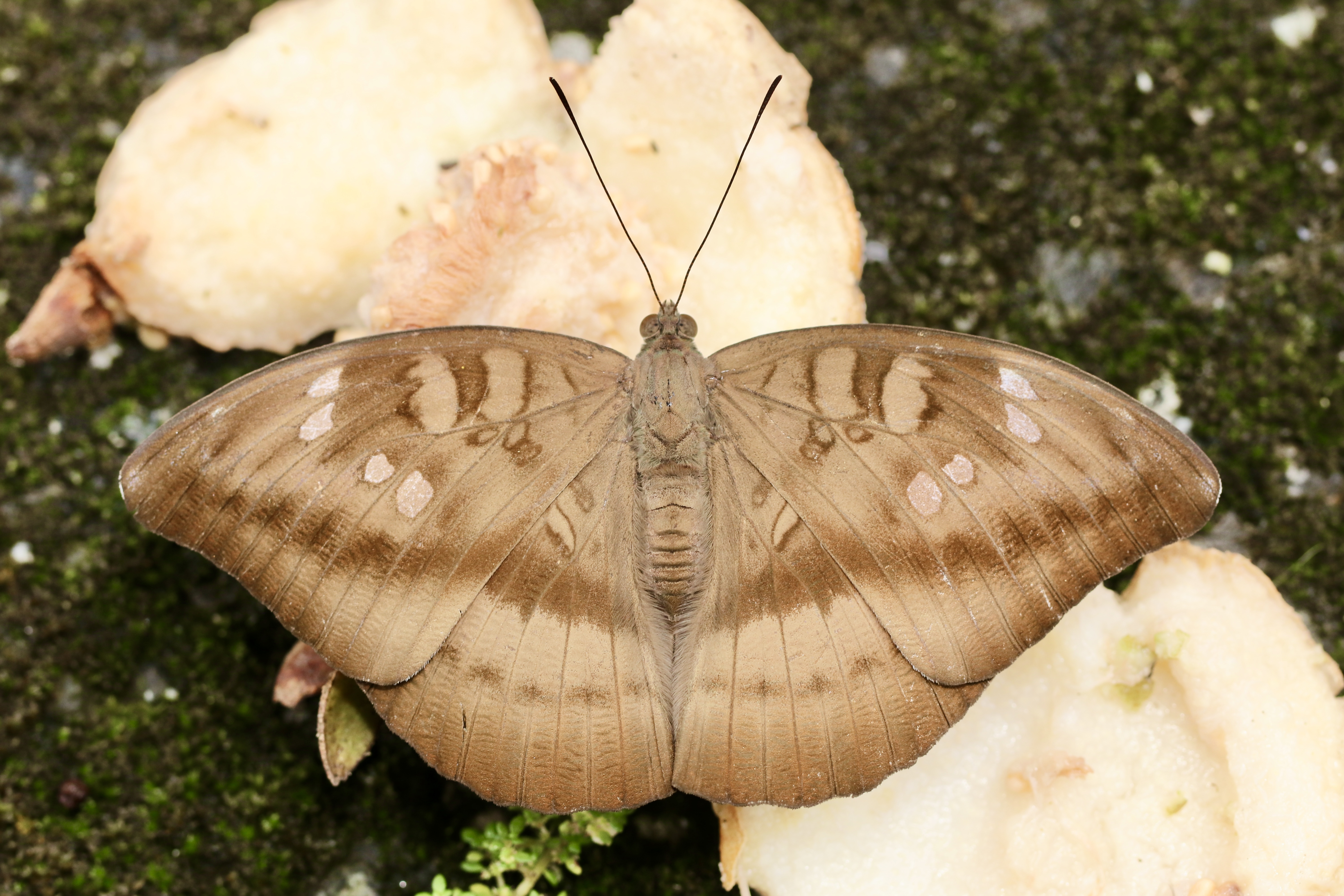
Euthalia telchinia (Ménétriés, 1857) - Blue Baron (Female)

Forewing: costa strongly arched, not falcate (sickle-shaped) below apex, which is slightly truncate; termen slightly concave, tornus rounded but very distinct, dorsum straight. Hindwing broadly pear shaped, the costa, apex and termen roundly curved; tornus slightly produced; dorsum arched, slightly emarginate above tornus.

Male has the upperside dark velvety brown. Forewing: basal area, cell and wing beyond apex of latter crossed by broad, short, paler brown bars, and a pale brown pre-apical patch. Hindwing uniform. Forewings and hindwings with a brilliant metallic blue terminal band, commencing just above the tornus on the forewing and gradually widening to the tornus on the hindwing. Underside rich fuliginous brown, basal area below the cell of the forewing and basal area of the hindwing with loop-like black markings; cellular area of forewing crossed by five transverse, short, sinuous, black lines; both forewing and hindwing with broad, lunular, very obscure, dark discal broad and postdiscal narrow transverse bands.

The female resembles the female of Tanaecia cocytus but apart from the difference in the shape of the forewing the ground colour on the upperside is a darker brown; there are five not four dingy white discal spots, the upper two and the lower two subequal; the inwardly oblique postdiscal dark band very diffuse and much broader. The underside is of a much paler ochraceous, but the markings are similar, Antennae, head, thorax and abdomen dark brown in both sexes; beneath in the male pale brownish, in the female ochraceous.
