= Regam Matyalingam =

Indian politician

Member of the Andhra Pradesh Legislative Assembly
- Incumbent
- Assumed office 2024
- Preceded by: Chetti Palguna
- Constituency: Araku Valley

Personal details
- Party: YSR Congress Party

Regam Matyalingam is an Indian politician from Andhra Pradesh. He is a member of YSR Congress Party. He has been elected as the Member of the Legislative Assembly representing the Araku Valley Assembly constituency in 2024 Andhra Pradesh Legislative Assembly elections.
