= Siveri Soma =

Indian politician (1966–2018)

Siveri Soma (1966 – 23 September 2018) was an Indian politician from Andhra Pradesh. He was a former Member of the Andhra Pradesh Legislative Assembly.

Soma is from Araku valley. His father was Joyyo. He studied till Class 6 at the Government High School, Araku Valley and later discontinued his studies. His son Siveri Suresh Kumar, was appointed on compassionate grounds as Deputy Tahsildar, after the rules were relaxed as a special case.

== Career ==
Soma represented the Telugu Desam Party and won the 2009 Andhra Pradesh Legislative Assembly election from Araku Valley Assembly constituency which was reserved for Scheduled Tribe community in the erstwhile Visakhapatnam district, later became Alluri Sitharama Raju district. He polled 34,959 votes and defeated his nearest rival Vanjangi Kanthamma of the Indian National Congress by a margin of 402 votes. He lost the 2014 Assembly election to Kidari Sarveswara Rao of YSR Congress Party who polled 63,700 votes. Soma got 29,647 votes and finished second.

On 23 September 2018, he was shot dead at Araku valley by Maoists along with the then sitting MLA Kidari Sarveswara Rao.
