= Vizagapatam district =

Vizagapatam District
- Area of British India
- 1947
- Flag
Succeeded by
Dominion of India

Vizagapatam District was a district in the Madras Presidency of British India. Covering an area of 44,600 square kilometres (17,222 sq mi) and sub-divided into 22 taluks.

== History ==
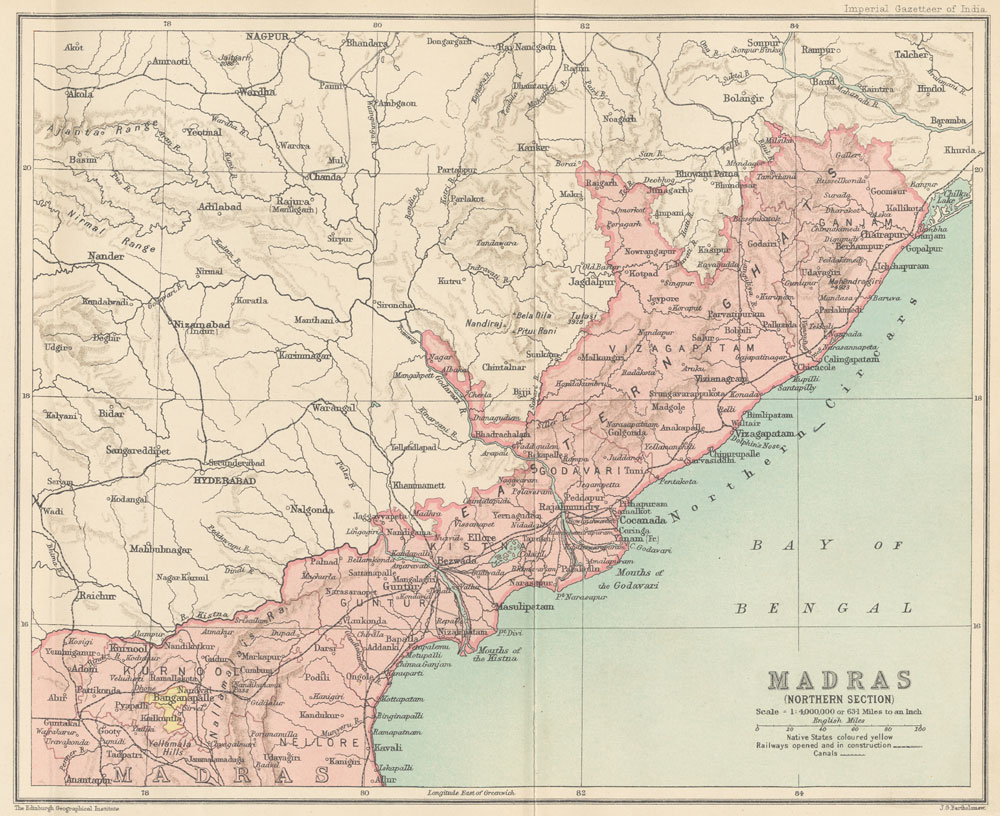
Madras province (North), 1909

During the British rule in India, Vizagapatam emerged as a district. It is one of the largest district in British India. On 1 April 1936, Bihar and Orissa Province was split to form Bihar Province and Orissa Province. Parts of the Vizagapatam District and the Ganjam District (excluding Ichchapuram, Palasa, Tekkali, Pathapatnam and Srikakulam) of Madras Presidency were transferred to Orissa Province along with portions of the Vizagapatam Hill Tracts Agency and Ganjam Hill Tracts Agency.

Present day it covers the areas of Visakhapatnam, Vizianagaram, Anakapalli, Alluri Sitharama Raju, Parvathipuram Manyam and part of Srikakulam districts of Andhra Pradesh and Koraput, Malkangiri, Nabarangapur, Ganjam and Rayagada districts of Odisha. The Vizagapatnam city is the administrative headquarters of the district.

== Taluks ==
Vizagapatam district was sub-divided into 22 taluks some of which were agencies.

- Koraput Agency (Area: 1,740 square kilometres (671 sq mi); Headquarters: Koraput)
- Nowrangapur Agency (Area: 5,630 square kilometres (2,172 sq mi); Headquarters: Nowrangapur)

== See also ==
History of Visakhapatnam
