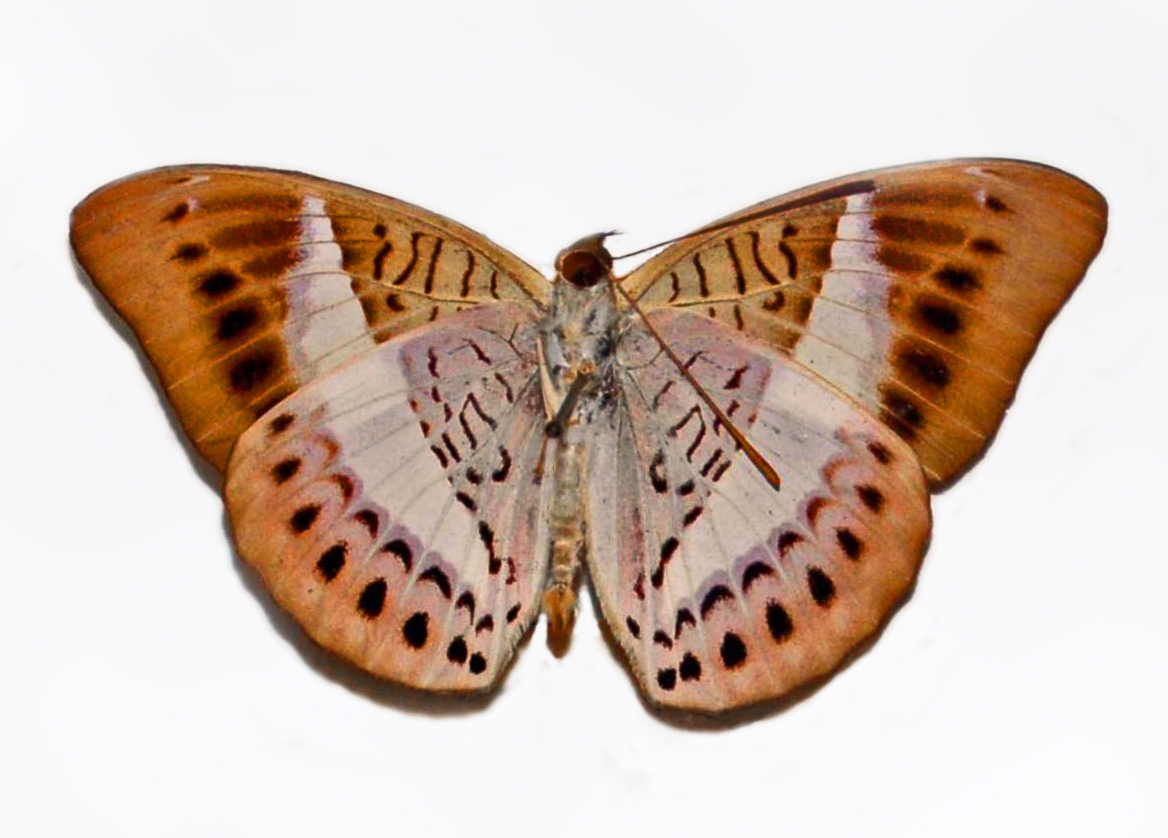
- Underside, from Borneo

Scientific classification
- Domain: Eukaryota
- Kingdom: Animalia
- Phylum: Arthropoda
- Class: Insecta
- Order: Lepidoptera
- Family: Nymphalidae
- Genus: Tanaecia
- Species: T. amisa

Binomial name
- Tanaecia amisa Grose-Smith, 1889

= Tanaecia amisa =

Species of butterfly

Tanaecia amisa is a species of butterfly of the family Nymphalidae.

== Description ==
Tanaecia amisa has a wingspan reaching about 80 millimetres (3.1 in). The upperside of both wings is dark velvety brown, crossed in the middle by a pure white band. The underwings show a pale brown band, edged in both sides with dark brown markings.

== Distribution ==
This species can be found in Borneo.
