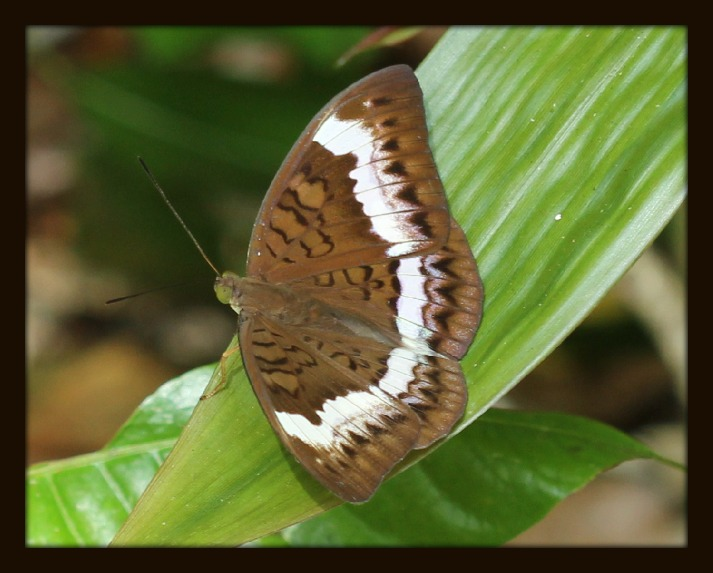

Scientific classification
- Domain: Eukaryota
- Kingdom: Animalia
- Phylum: Arthropoda
- Class: Insecta
- Order: Lepidoptera
- Family: Nymphalidae
- Genus: Tanaecia
- Species: T. cibaritis

Binomial name
- Tanaecia cibaritis (Hewitson, 1874)

Synonyms
- Adolias cibaritis Hewitson, 1874; Tanaecia cibaritis f. vinaya Fruhstorfer, 1913

= Tanaecia cibaritis =

Andaman viscount

Species of butterfly

Tanaecia cibaritis, the Andaman viscount, is a species of nymphalid butterfly found in the Andaman Islands in the Indian Ocean.

== Description ==
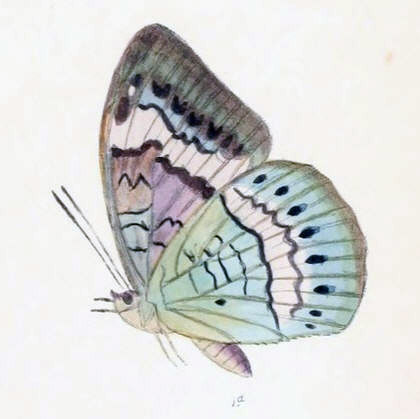
Underside

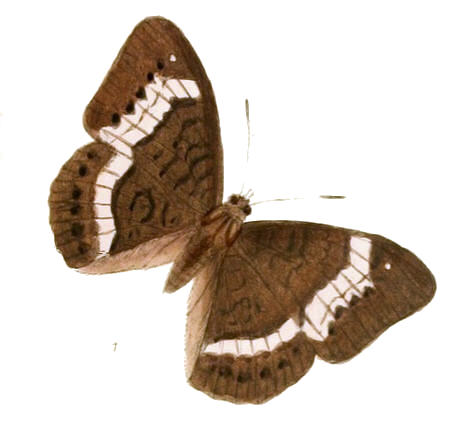
Upperside

Its upperside is brown and has a prominent white band bordered by a black spots. The underside is pale green. The males differ from the females having a narrower white band on the posterior wing and underside is bordered on both sides with black spots. This is the largest in the trigerta species group.

== Ecology ==
It is usually found in moist forested regions, along the forest paths and clearings.

=== Host plants ===
The known host plants include Krukoviella obovata.
