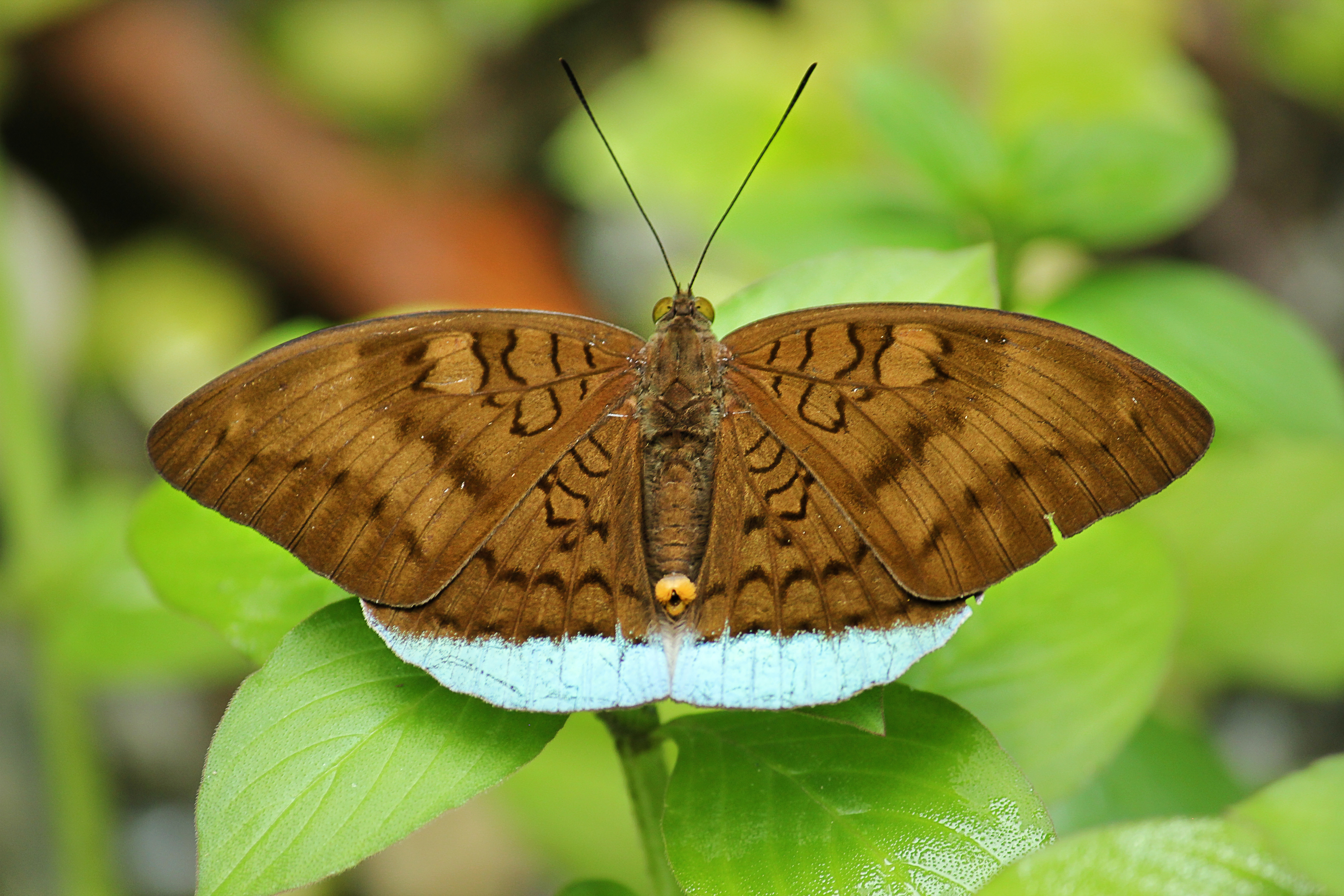

Scientific classification
- Kingdom: Animalia
- Phylum: Arthropoda
- Class: Insecta
- Order: Lepidoptera
- Family: Nymphalidae
- Genus: Tanaecia
- Species: T. julii

Binomial name
- Tanaecia julii Lesson, 1837

Synonyms
- Euthalia julii

= Tanaecia julii =

Common earl

Species of butterfly

Tanaecia julii, the common earl, is a species of nymphalid butterfly found in South and South-East Asia.

== Gallery ==
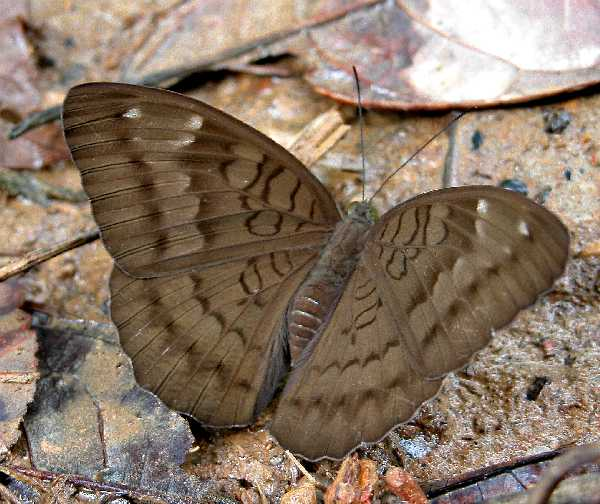
At Jairampur, Arunachal Pradesh, India

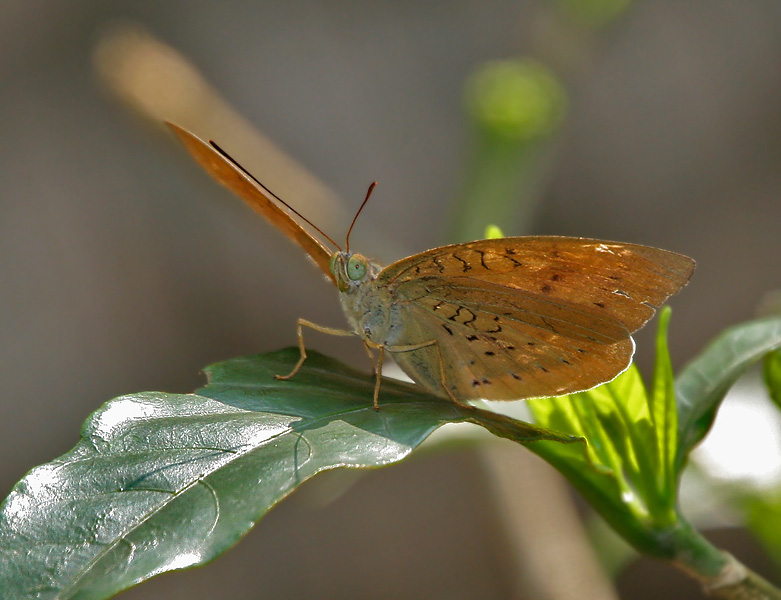
At Samsing in Darjeeling district of West Bengal, India

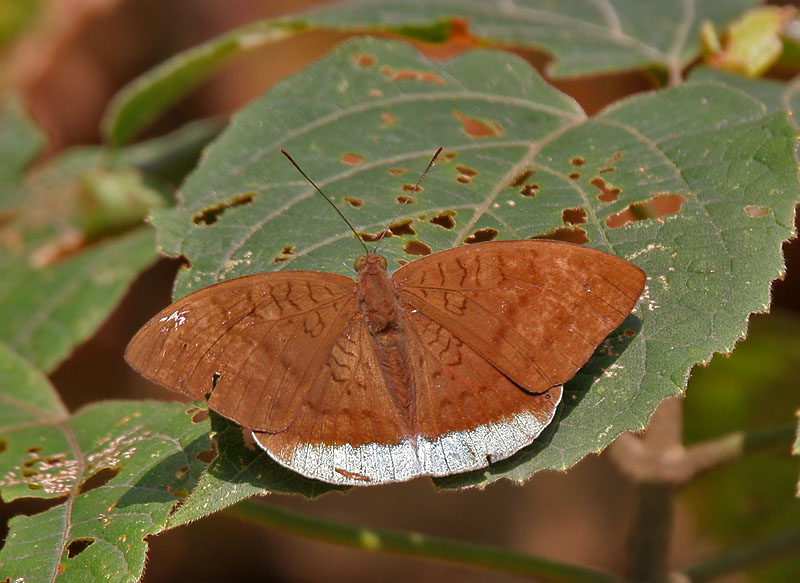
At Samsing

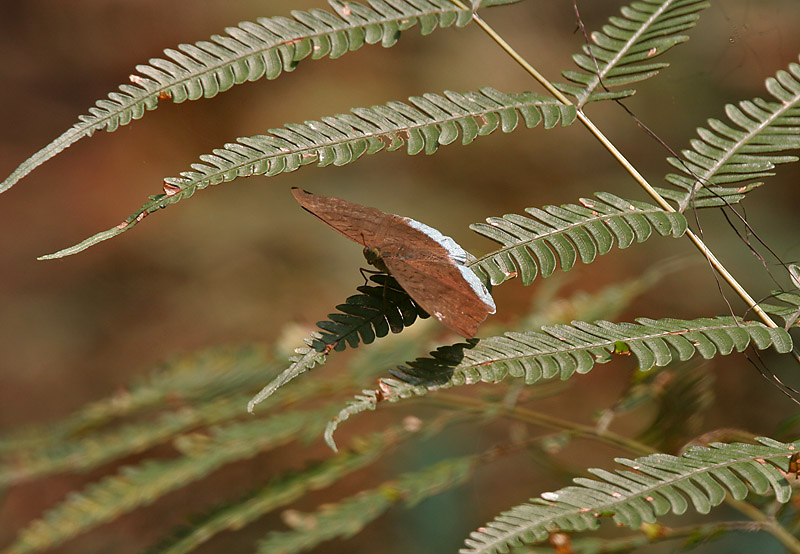
At Samsing

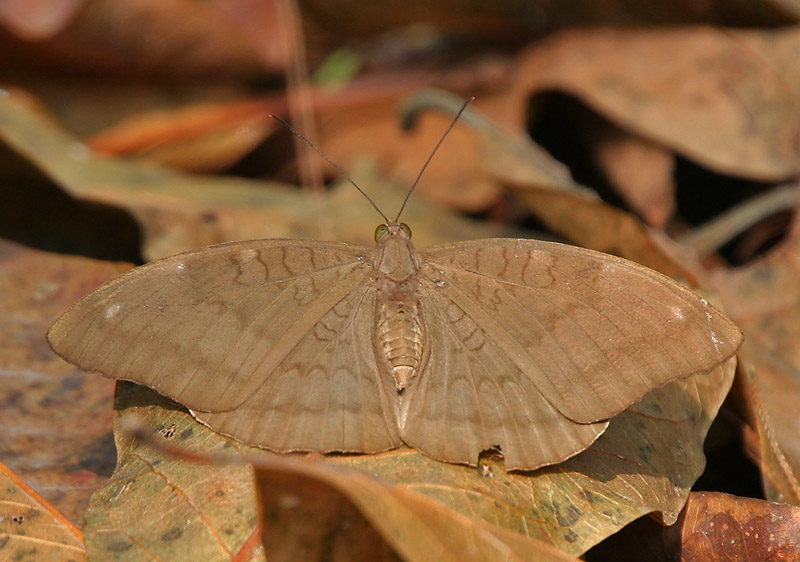
At Samsing

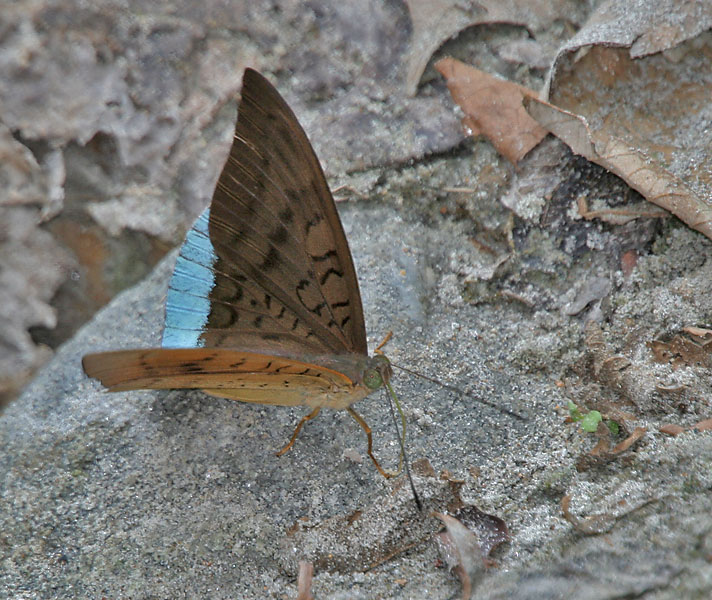
At Jayanti in Buxa Tiger Reserve in Jalpaiguri district of West Bengal

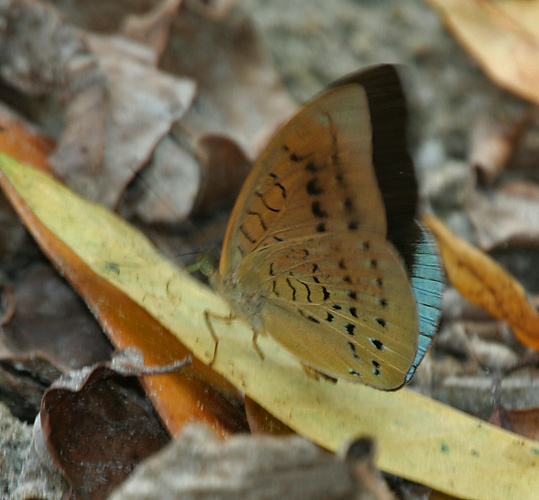
At Jayanti

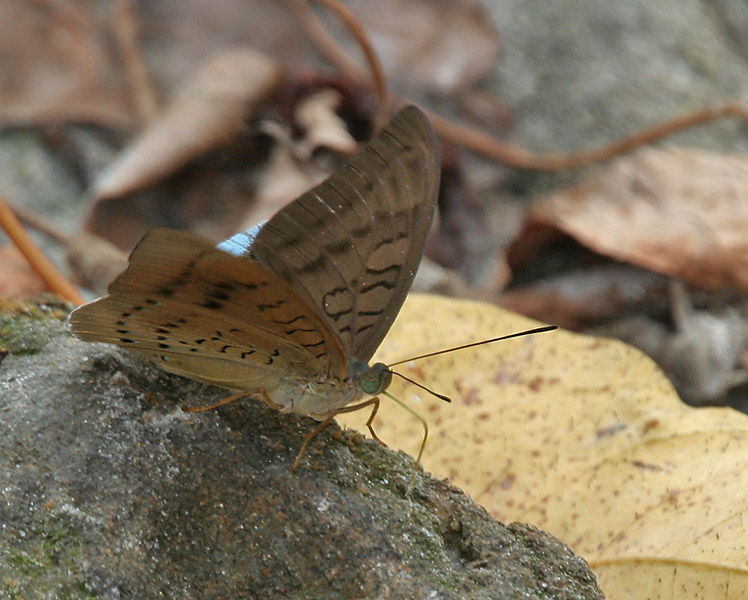
At Jayanti

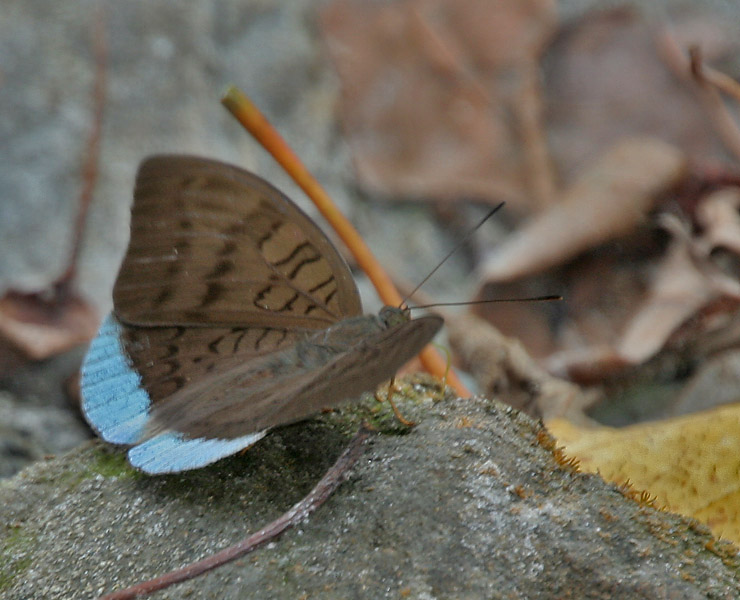
At Jayanti

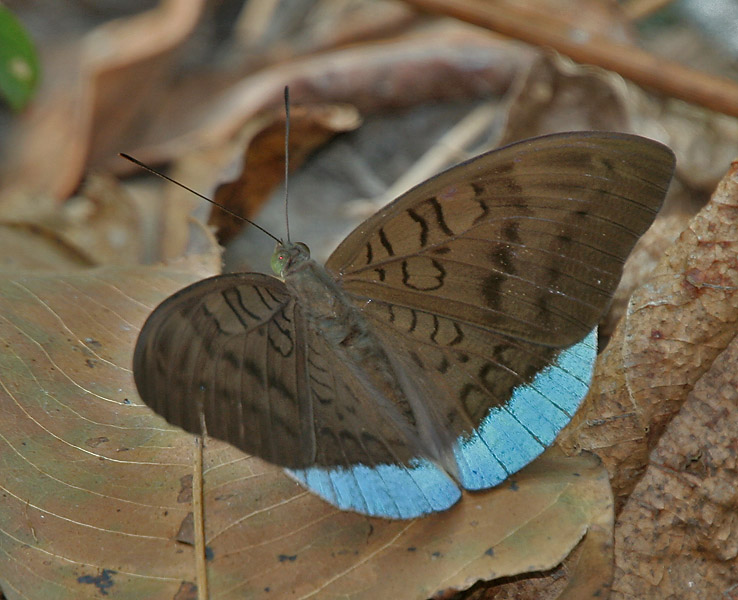
At Jayanti

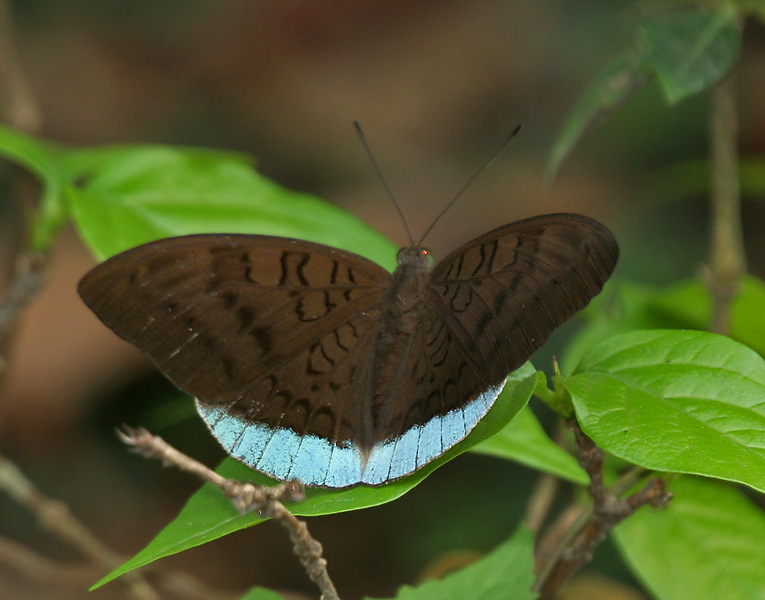
At Jayanti

== See also ==
- List of butterflies of India (Nymphalidae)
