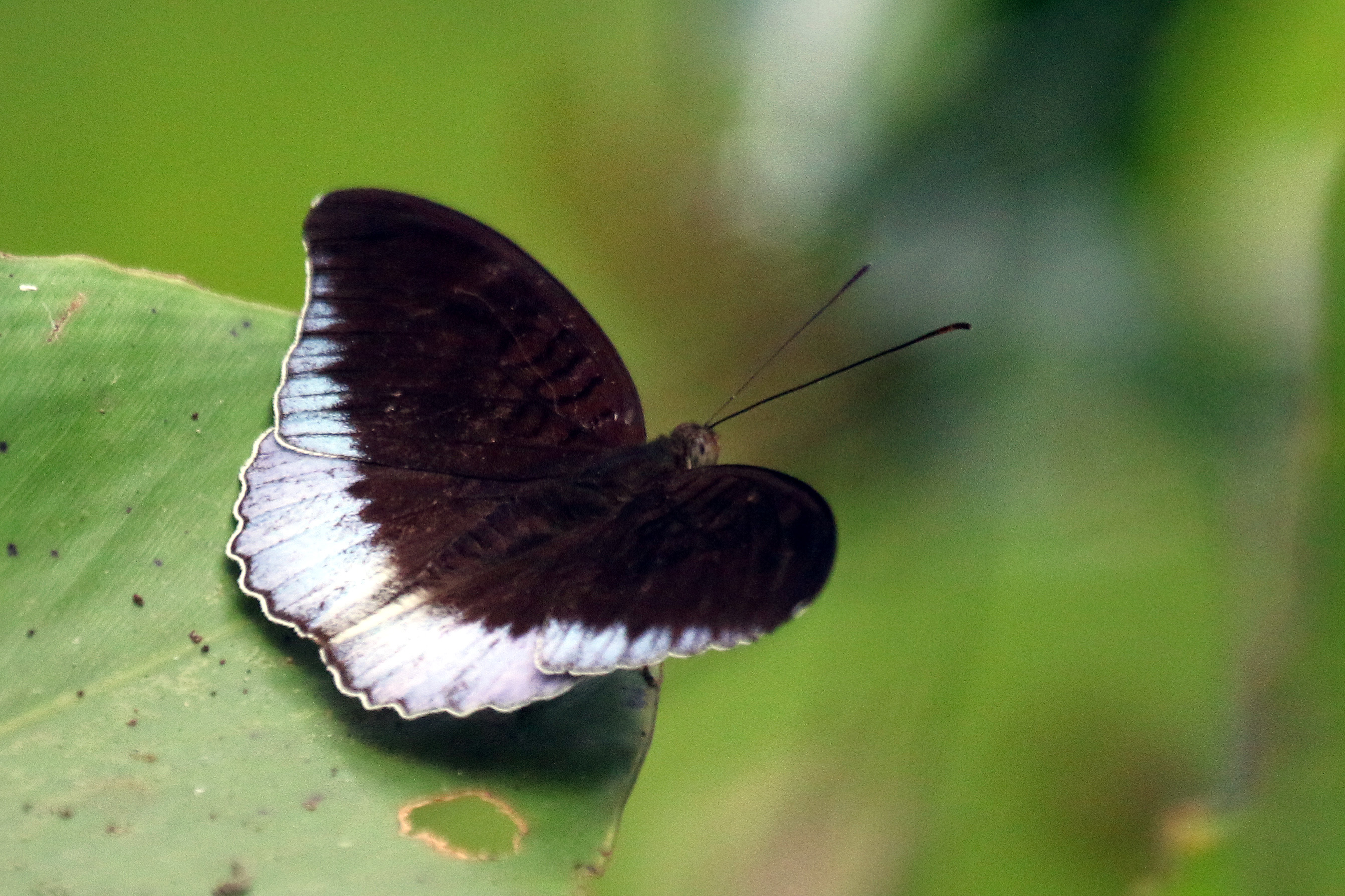
- Tanaecia iapis violetta male (Horsfield's baron); Sabah, Borneo, Malaysia

Scientific classification
- Domain: Eukaryota
- Kingdom: Animalia
- Phylum: Arthropoda
- Class: Insecta
- Order: Lepidoptera
- Family: Nymphalidae
- Tribe: Adoliadini
- Genus: Tanaecia; Butler, [1869]

Synonyms
- Bucasia Moore, [1897]; Haramba Moore, [1897]; Passirona Moore, [1897]; Saparona Moore, [1897]; Passirona Moore, [1897]; Saparona Moore, [1897]; Felderia Semper, 1888; Cynitia Snellen, 1895

= Tanaecia =

Genus of brush-footed butterflies

Tanaecia is a genus of butterflies of the family Nymphalidae.

== Species ==
The genus includes the following species:

- Tanaecia amisa Grose-Smith, 1889
- Tanaecia ampla Butler, 1901
- Tanaecia aruna (C. & R. Felder, 1860)
- Tanaecia borromeoi Schröder, 1977
- Tanaecia calliphorus (C. & R. Felder, 1861)
- Tanaecia cibaritis (Hewitson, 1874)
- Tanaecia clathrata (Vollenhoven, 1862)
- Tanaecia cocytus (Fabricius, 1787) - lavender count
- Tanaecia coelebs Corbet, 1941
- Tanaecia dodong Schröder & Treadaway, 1978
- Tanaecia elone de Nicéville, 1893
- Tanaecia flora Butler, 1873
- Tanaecia godartii (Gray, 1846)
- Tanaecia howarthii Jumalon, 1975
- Tanaecia iapis (Godard, 1824)
- Tanaecia jahnu (Moore, 1857) - plain earl
- Tanaecia julii (Lesson, 1837) - common earl
- Tanaecia lepidea (Butler, 1868) - grey count
- Tanaecia leucotaenia Semper, 1878
- Tanaecia lutala (Moore, 1859)
- Tanaecia munda Fruhstorfer, 1899
- Tanaecia orphne Butler, 1870
- Tanaecia palawana Staudinger, 1889
- Tanaecia palguna (Moore, 1858)
- Tanaecia pelea (Fabricius, 1787)
- Tanaecia susoni Jumalon, 1975
- Tanaecia trigerta (Moore, 1857)
- Tanaecia valmikis C. & R. Felder, 1867
- Tanaecia vikrama C. & R. Felder, 1867
