= Peda Bayalu mandal =

Coordinates: 18°23′28″N 82°30′15″E

Peda Bayalu
- Mandal
- Interactive map of Peda Bayalu
- Country: India
- State: Andhra Pradesh
- District: Alluri Sitharama Raju

Languages
  - Official: Telugu
- Time zone: UTC+5:30 (IST)
- PIN: 531040
- Vehicle Registration: AP31, AP32, AP33 (Former); AP39 (from 30 January 2019)

Peda Bayalu mandal is in Alluri Sitharama Raju district in the state of Andhra Pradesh in India. Its headquarters is at Peda Bayalu.
