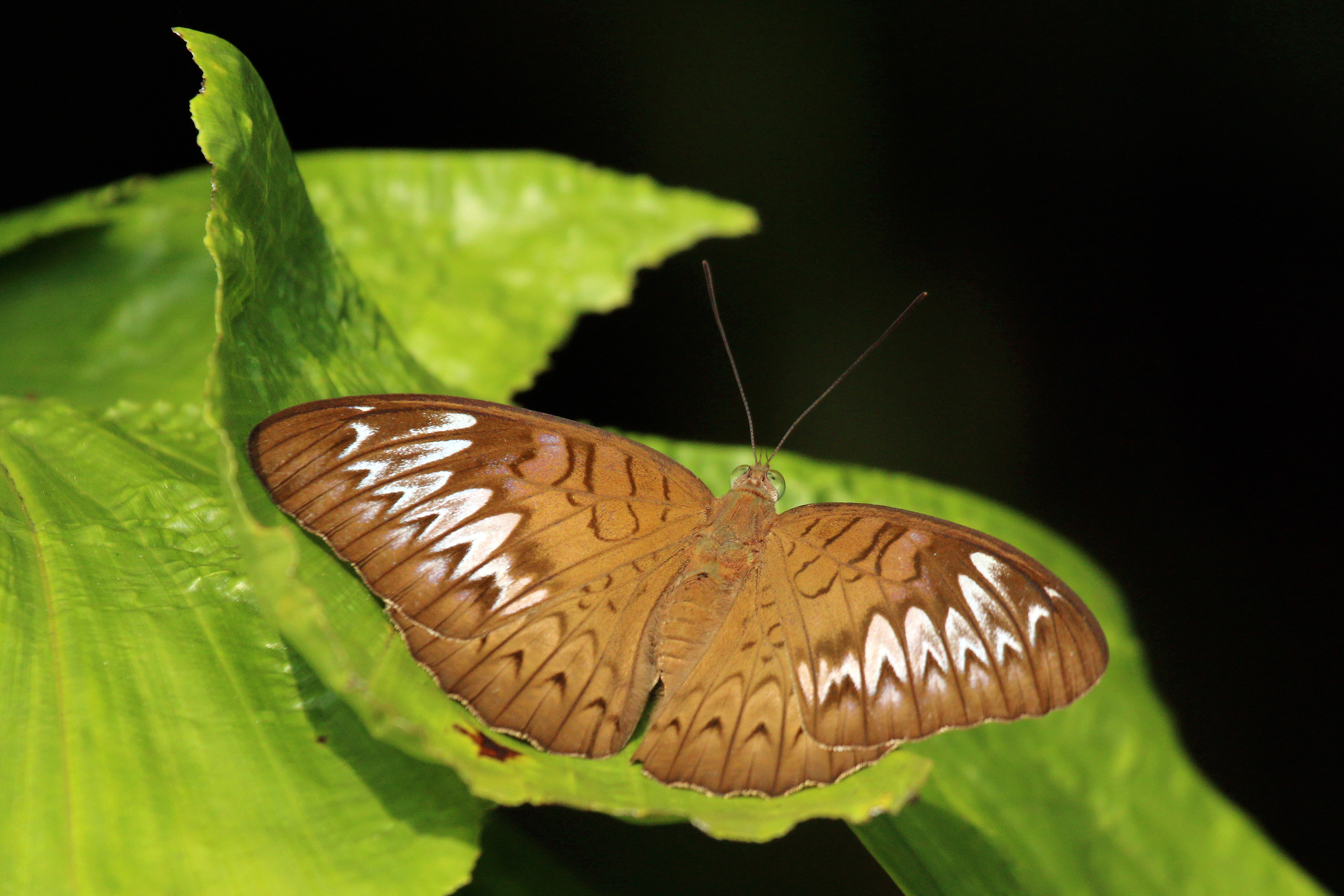
- T. p. pelea, Singapore
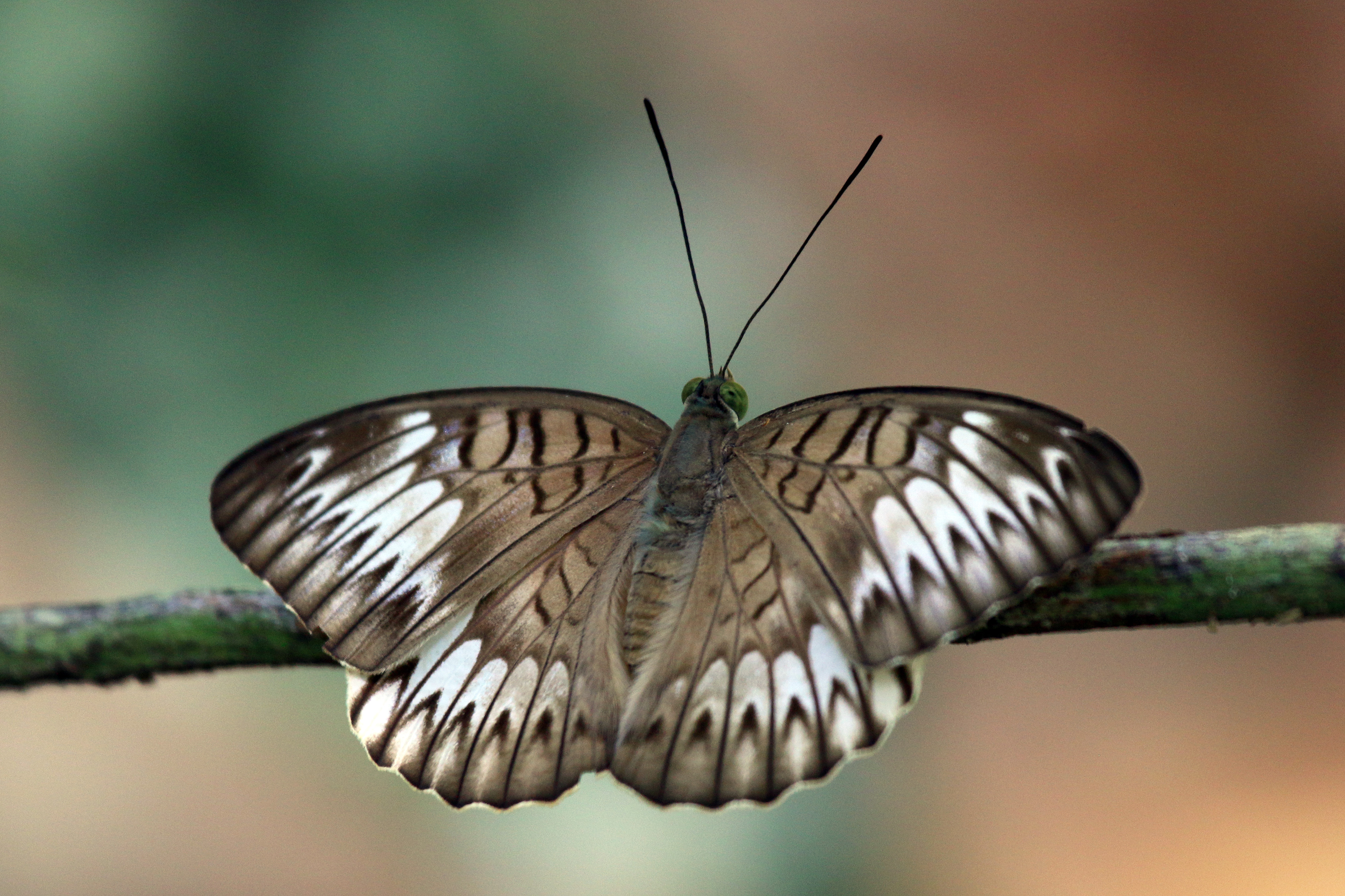
- T. p. irenae, Borneo

Scientific classification
- Domain: Eukaryota
- Kingdom: Animalia
- Phylum: Arthropoda
- Class: Insecta
- Order: Lepidoptera
- Family: Nymphalidae
- Genus: Tanaecia
- Species: T. pelea

Binomial name
- Tanaecia pelea Fabricius, 1787

Synonyms
- Papilio pelea Fabricius, 1787; Adolias pulasara Moore, 1859; Tanaecia irenae Corbet, 1937

= Tanaecia pelea =

Species of butterfly

Tanaecia pelea, the Malay viscount, is a species of butterfly of the family Nymphalidae.

== Description ==
Tanaecia pelea has a wingspan of about 65–70 millimetres (2.6–2.8 in). The basic colour of the upper wings is pale brown with pearly-bluish edges. It has dark brown marking on the basal area and a discal series of dark brown-edged hastate (spear-shaped) markings.

== Distribution ==
It is found in Singapore, mainland Malaysia, Borneo, Nias and Pulau Tioman.

== Subspecies ==
- T. p. pelea (Malaya, Borneo)
- T. p. heliophila (Nias)
- T. p. irenae (Pulau Tioman)

== Gallery ==
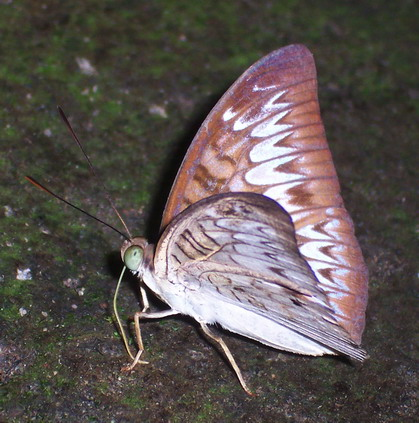
Ventral view from Indonesia

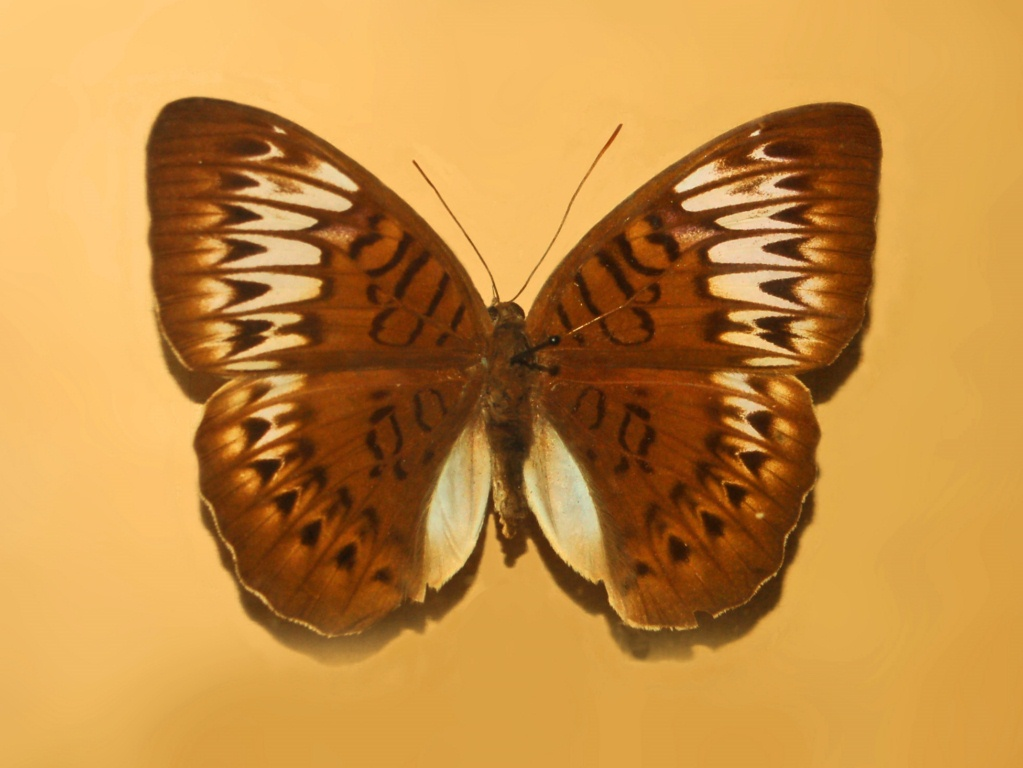
T. p. heliophila from Nias Island

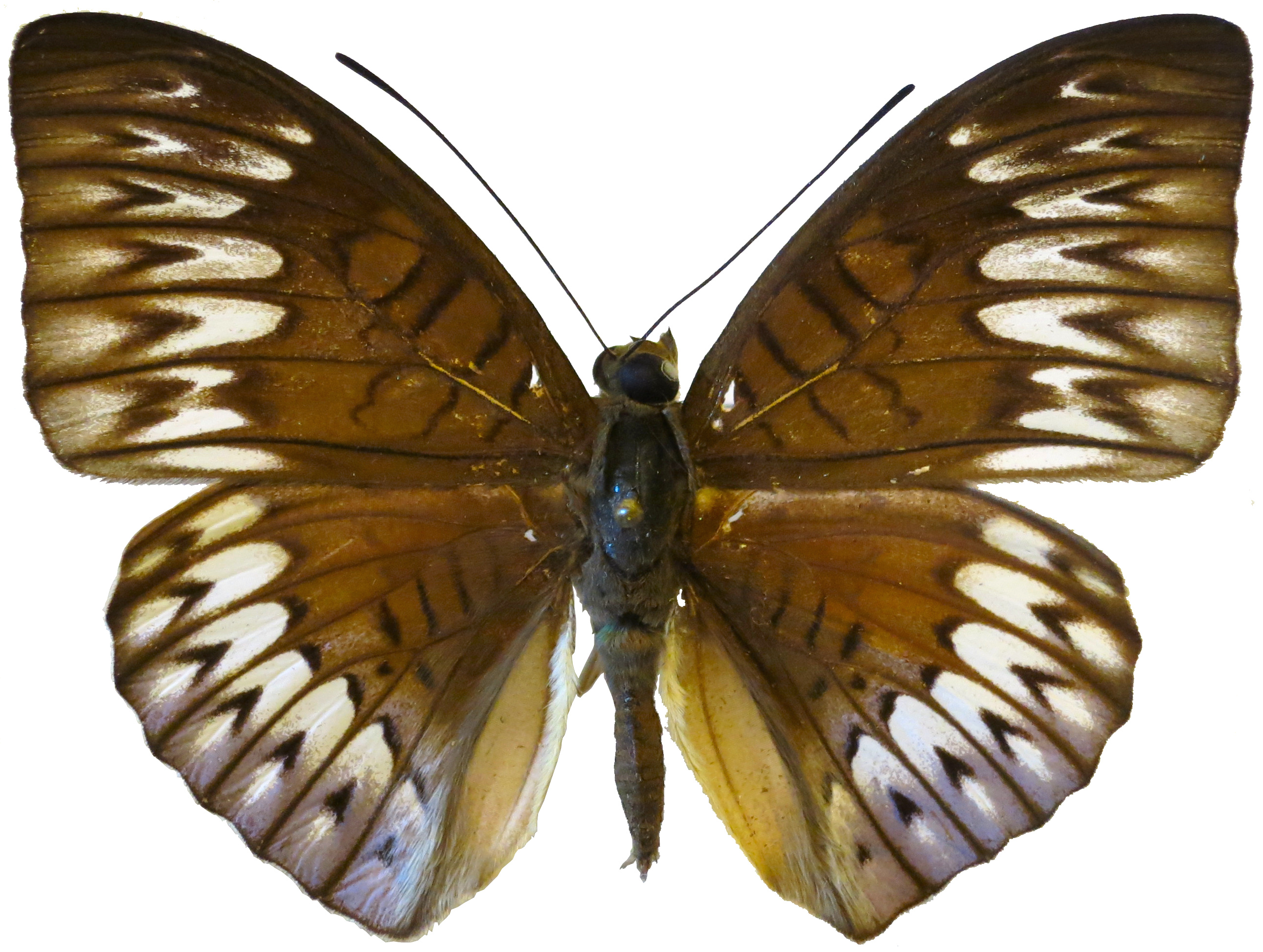
T. p. pelea male from Harau, West Sumatra

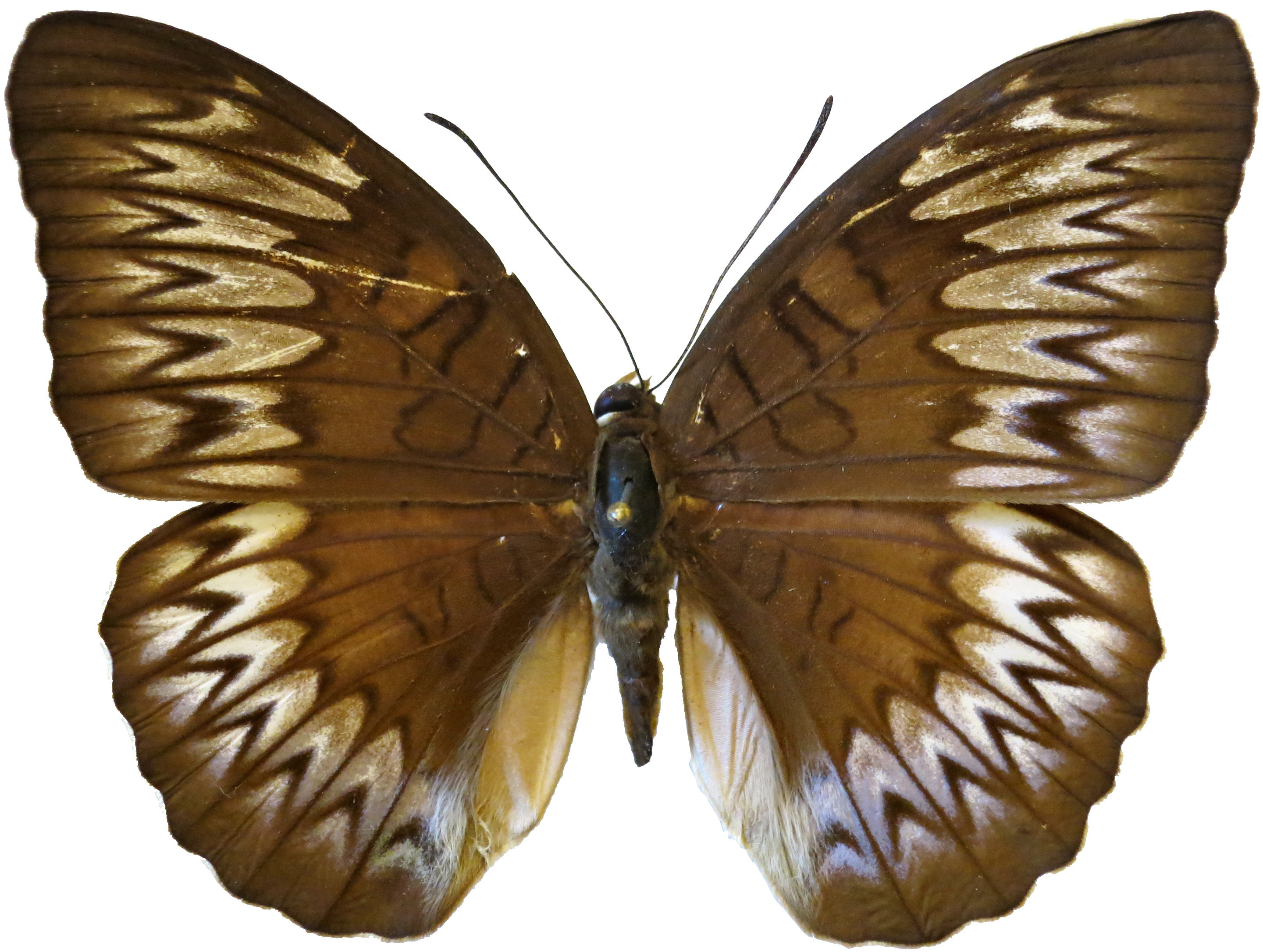
T. p. pelea female from Harau, West Sumatra

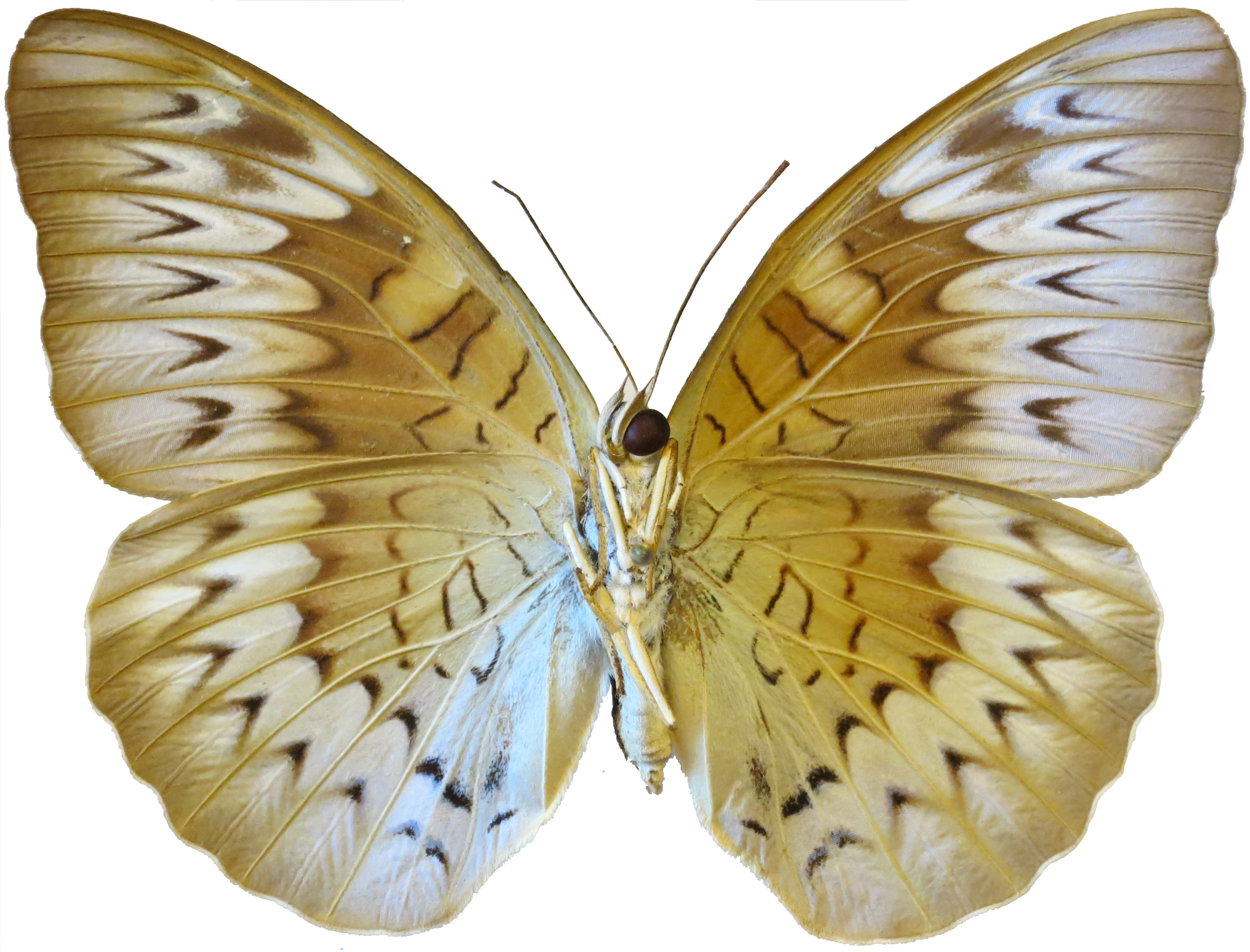
T. p. pelea female (ventral side) from Harau, West Sumatra
