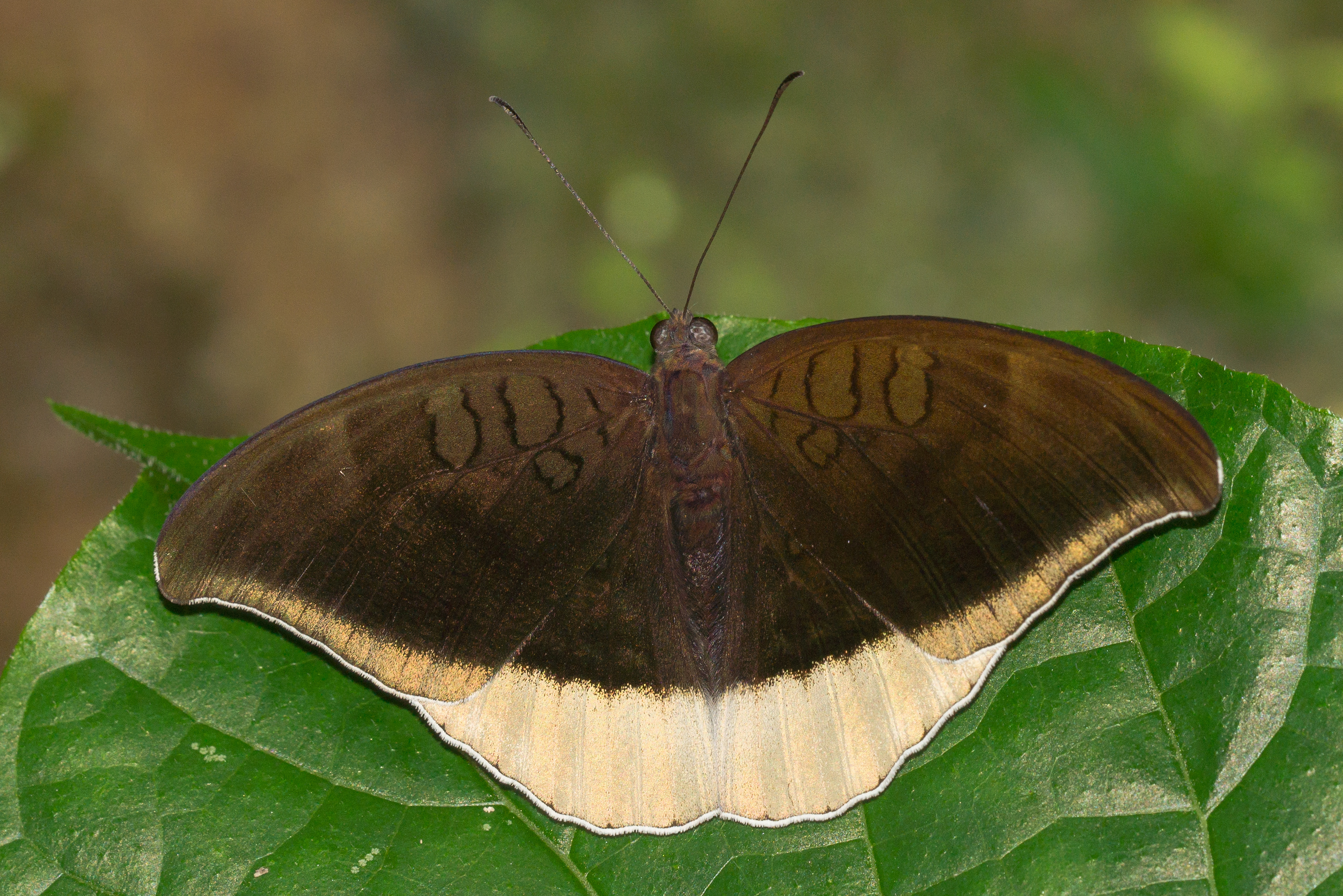
- T. l. miyana, Kerala

Scientific classification
- Kingdom: Animalia
- Phylum: Arthropoda
- Clade: Pancrustacea
- Class: Insecta
- Order: Lepidoptera
- Family: Nymphalidae
- Genus: Tanaecia
- Species: T. lepidea

Binomial name
- Tanaecia lepidea (Butler, 1868)

Synonyms
- Euthalia lepidea (Butler, 1868); Cynitia lepidea (Butler, 1868)

= Tanaecia lepidea =

Grey count

Species of butterfly

Tanaecia lepidea, the grey count, is a species of nymphalid butterfly found in South and Southeast Asia.

== Description ==
=== Male ===
The upperside is dark brown, with obscure black markings of transverse lines across the cells of both forewings and hindwings and an oblique discal fascia on the forewing. An ash-grey continuous band flows along the termen of forewings and hindwings, gradually broadening from the narrow apex of the forewing, to the tornus of the hindwing, where it covers about one-third of the wing.

The cilia are white. The antennae, head, thorax and abdomen are dark brown; beneath, the antennae are ochraceous, the rest dusky white washed with ochraceous.

The underside is brown. The colours are paler on the hindwing; the forewing somewhat narrowly, the hindwing much more broadly suffused with lilacine-grey on the terminal margins and along the dorsal margin of the hindwing. Cells of both wings have dark brown sinuous transverse lines and looplike markings; both forewings and hindwings are crossed by somewhat diffuse broad discal and narrower postdiscal dark bands, prominent on the forewing, obscure on the hindwing. The male has a patch of specialized dark scales above vein 4 on the upperside of the hindwing.

=== Female ===
The upperside is paler. The termen band is outwardly narrowly bordered with brown. The underside is bright ochraceous.

== Distribution ==
Found in forested habitats of the lower Himalayas eastwards from Almora. In the Western Ghats, central India, Orissa, Bengal and into Assam and the Malay Peninsula.

== Life history ==
=== Larva ===
"Of the usual Euthalia form; colour green with a dorsal row of light red ocelli with blue centres; spines tipped with yellow."

=== Pupa ===
"More narrowed at the head than E. garuda, green, all the points golden tipped with black, and a few large spots of gold between."

Food plants include Melastoma malabathricum and Planchonia careya.

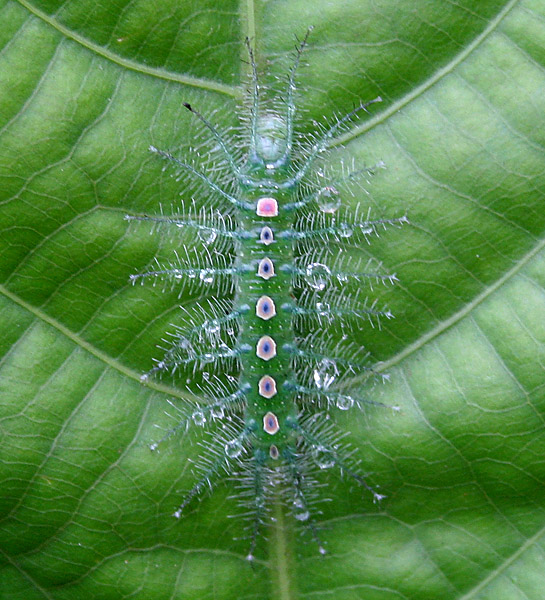
caterpillar on Careya arborea

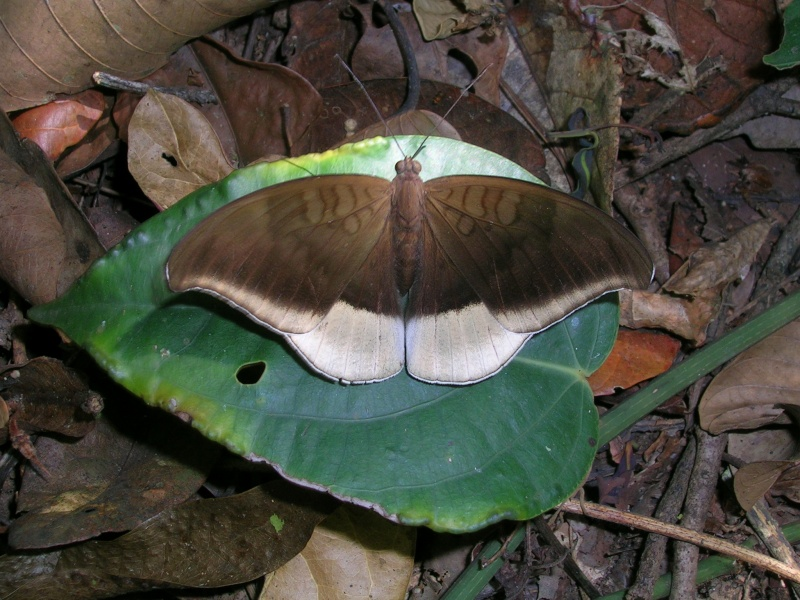
Basking on sunlit leaves

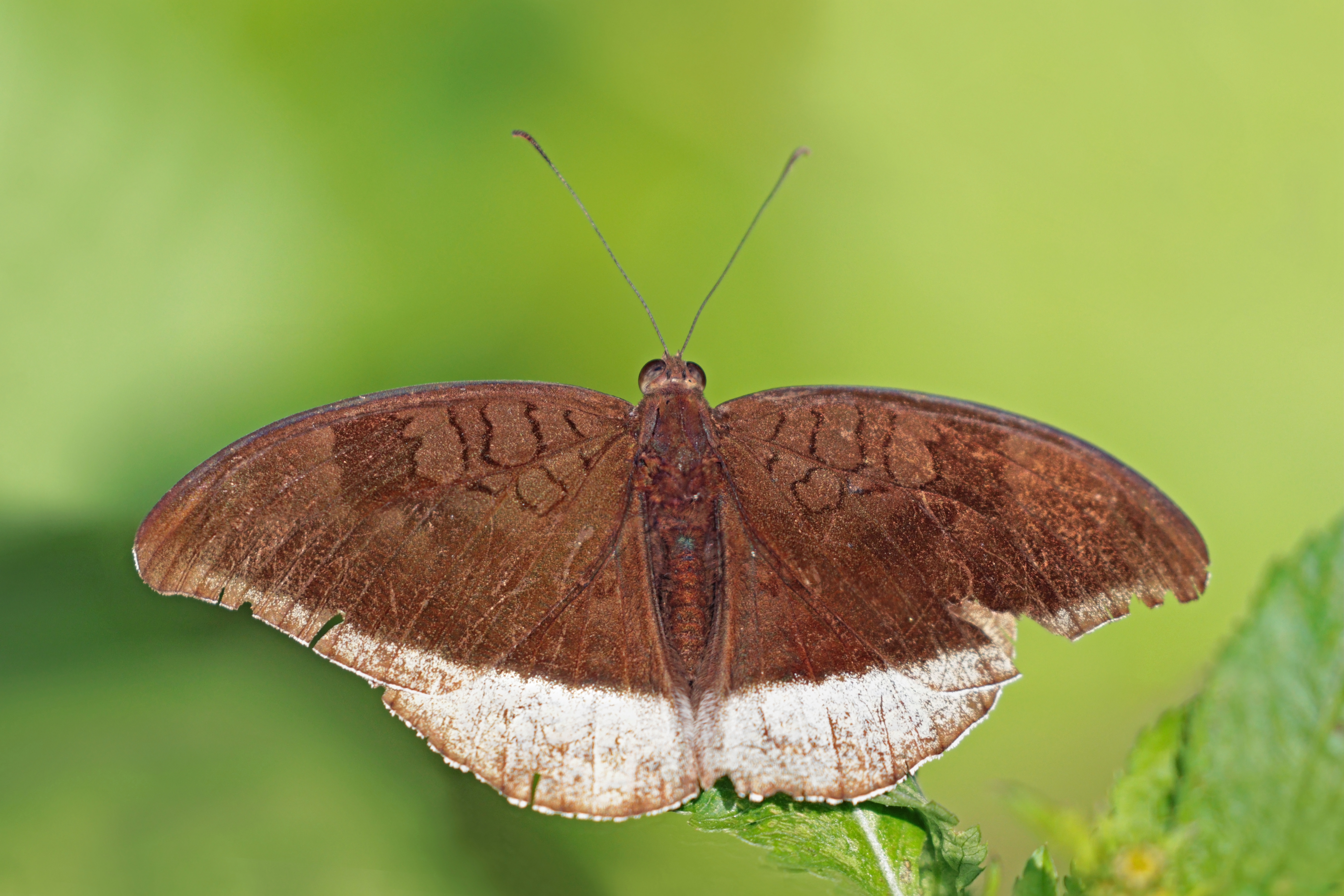
T. l. lepidea, Nepal

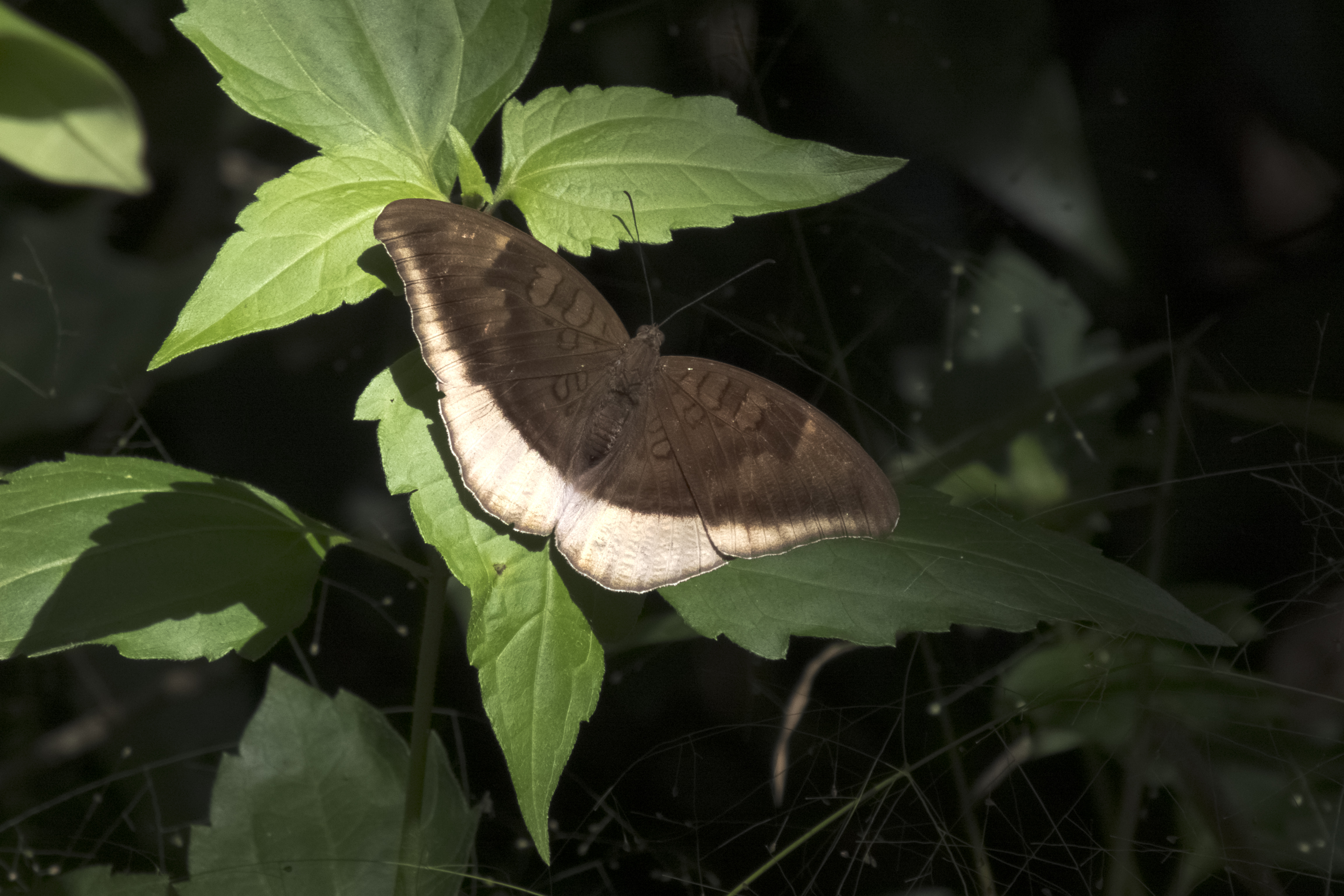
Doyang Reserve, Nagaland

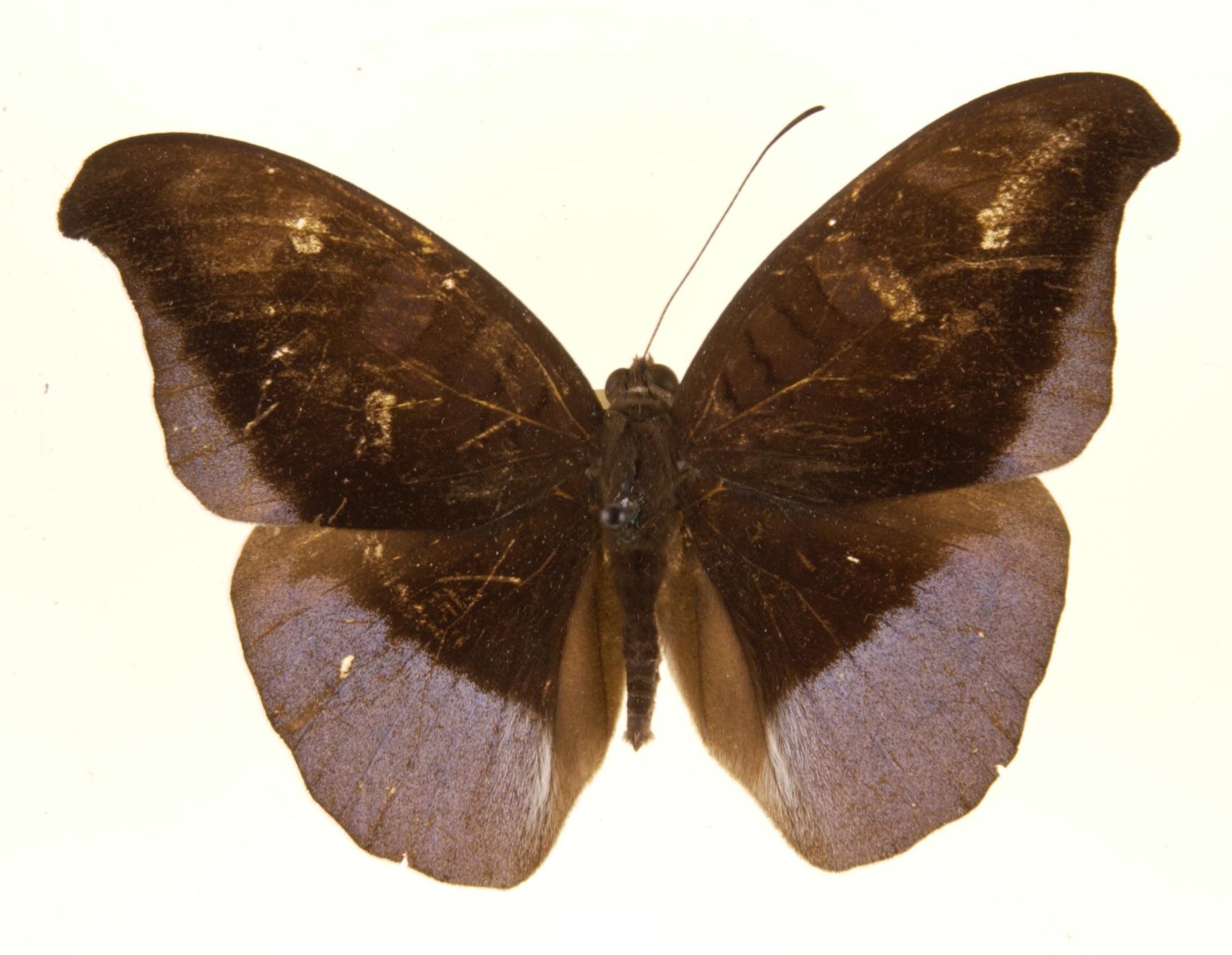
Museum specimen
