= Tanaecia calliphorus =

- Figure 9

Scientific classification
- Kingdom: Animalia
- Phylum: Arthropoda
- Clade: Pancrustacea
- Class: Insecta
- Order: Lepidoptera
- Family: Nymphalidae
- Genus: Tanaecia
- Species: T. calliphorus

Binomial name
- Tanaecia calliphorus (C. & R. Felder, 1861)

Synonyms
- Adolias calliphorus C. & R. Felder, 1861; Tanaecia calliphorus mindorana Fruhstorfer, 1904; Adolias locbania Boisduval, 1861

Species of butterfly

Tanaecia calliphorus is an Indomalayan butterfly of the family Nymphalidae (Limenitidinae). It is endemic to the Philippines.

== Subspecies ==
- T. c. calliphorus (Philippines: Luzon, Polillo, Babuyanes)
- T. c. smaragdifera Fruhstorfer, 1913 (Philippines: Mindoro)
- T. c. volupia Tsukada & Nishiyama, 1981 (Philippines: Camiguin)
