= Kidari Sravan Kumar =

Indian politician

Minister of Tribal Welfare & Empowerment, Primary Health & Family Welfare, APVVP, Ayush & Drug Control Government of Andhra Pradesh
- In office 11 November 2018 – 9 May 2019
- Chief Minister: N. Chandrababu Naidu

Personal details
- Born: Visakhapatnam, Andhra Pradesh, India
- Political party: Telugu Desam Party
- Parent: Kidari Sarveswara Rao (father)
- Occupation: Politician

Kidari Sravan Kumar is an Indian politician. He was inducted as State Tribal Welfare, Primary Health, Family Welfare, Vaidya Vidhana Parishad, Drug Control and Ayush Minister without participation in Public Election by TDP Government after his father Kidari Sarveswara Rao was killed at Araku valley by Maoists.

== Political career ==
Kidari Sravan is the son of late TDP MLA of Araku, Kidari Sarveswara Rao. Sravan got his cabinet seat as a token of TDP’s gratitude towards the Kidari family. He was inducted as Health and Tribal Welfare Minister in the AP cabinet on 2018 November 11 without becoming either an MLC or an MLA. He was required to be a member of the assembly or legislative council on or before 10 May 2019, but he failed to become a lawmaker within the mandatory six-month period from the day of induction into the cabinet. Sravan Kumar resigned on 9 May 2019. He unsuccessfully contested from Araku Valley in 2019 Assembly elections.
