= Makkuva =

- Village
- Interactive map of Makkuva
- Location in Andhra Pradesh, India Makkuva (India)
- Coordinates: 18.6667°N 83.2667°E
- Country: India
- State: Andhra Pradesh
- District: Parvathipuram Manyam

Government
  - Sarpanch: Lingam Mohana rao
- Elevation: 123 m (404 ft)

Languages
  - Official: Telugu
- Time zone: UTC+5:30 (IST)
- PIN: 535 547
- Telephone code: 08964
- Vehicle Registration: AP35 (Former); AP39 (from 30 January 2019)

Makkuva is a village in Parvathipuram Manyam district of the Indian state of Andhra Pradesh.

== Geography ==
Makkuva is located at 18.6667°N 83.2667°E. It has an average elevation of 123 meters (406 feet).

== Demography ==
Makkuva mandal has a population of about 60,000 in 2007. Males consists of 33,000 and females 27,000 of the population. The average literacy rate is 48%, below the national average of 59.5%. Male literacy rate is 61% and that of females 35%.

== See also ==
- Makkuva mandal
- Parvathipuram Manyam district
