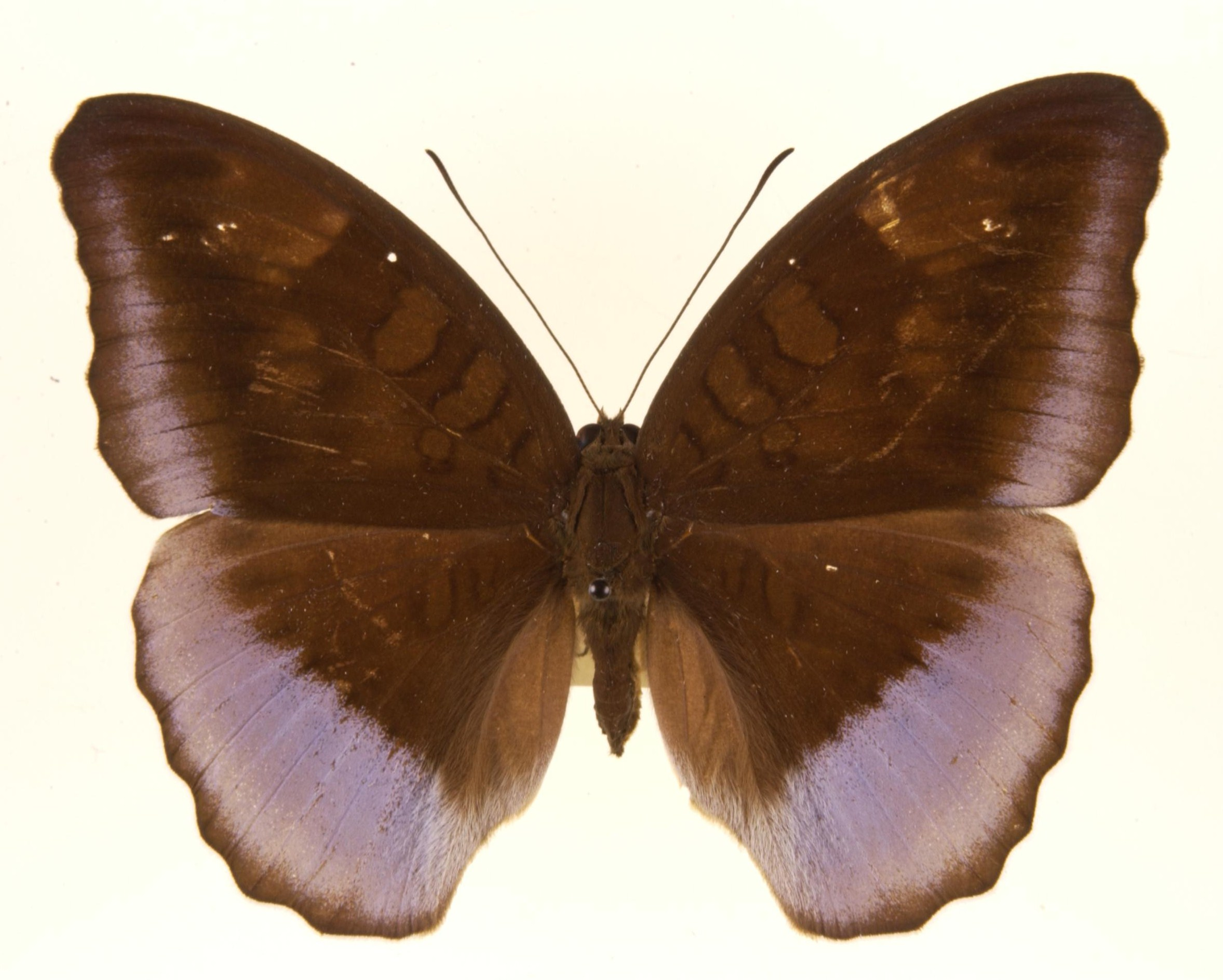

Scientific classification
- Domain: Eukaryota
- Kingdom: Animalia
- Phylum: Arthropoda
- Class: Insecta
- Order: Lepidoptera
- Family: Nymphalidae
- Genus: Tanaecia
- Species: T. cocytus

Binomial name
- Tanaecia cocytus (Fabricius, 1787)

Synonyms
- Papilio cocytus Fabricius, 1787; Adolias satropaces Hewitson, 1876; Euthalia sebonga (Talbot & Corbet, 1943)

= Tanaecia cocytus =

Lavender count

Species of butterfly

Tanaecia cocytus, the lavender count, is a species of nymphalid butterfly found in South and Southeast Asia.

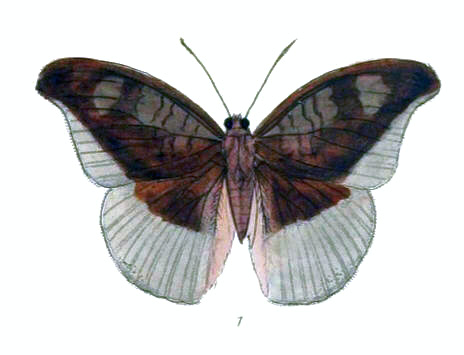
