= Ganjam Hill Tracts Agency =

Ganjam Hill Tracts Agency was an agency in the Ganjam district of the erstwhile Madras Presidency, British India. It was created by the Act XXIV of 1839 from the 'Maliahs' or Highlands, the tribal lands inhabited by the Khonds and the Soras. The territory consists of the western part of Ganjam district. It was about five-twelfths of the district and had a total area of 3,500 square miles.

When the province of Orissa was created on 1 April 1936, the Ganjam Hill Tracts Agency was partitioned into two, leaving the southern part of the Paralakhemundi State in Madras and the rest of the agency in Orissa Province. Most of the erstwhile Ganjam Hill Tracts Agency lie in the Srikakulam district of Andhra Pradesh and the Gajapati and Ganjam districts of Odisha.

== See also ==
- Agencies of British India
- Vizagapatam Hill Tracts Agency
