= Waltair Main Road =

Street in Visakhapatnam, Andhra Pradesh, India

Coordinates: 17.721866°N 83.316277°E

Waltair Main Road is a street in the heart of Visakhapatnam, connecting Jagadamba Centre and Siripuram. This road is home to Andhra University, the prestigious state university of the state of Andhra Pradesh. This road is one of the city's major shopping hubs and a prominent posh locality.
