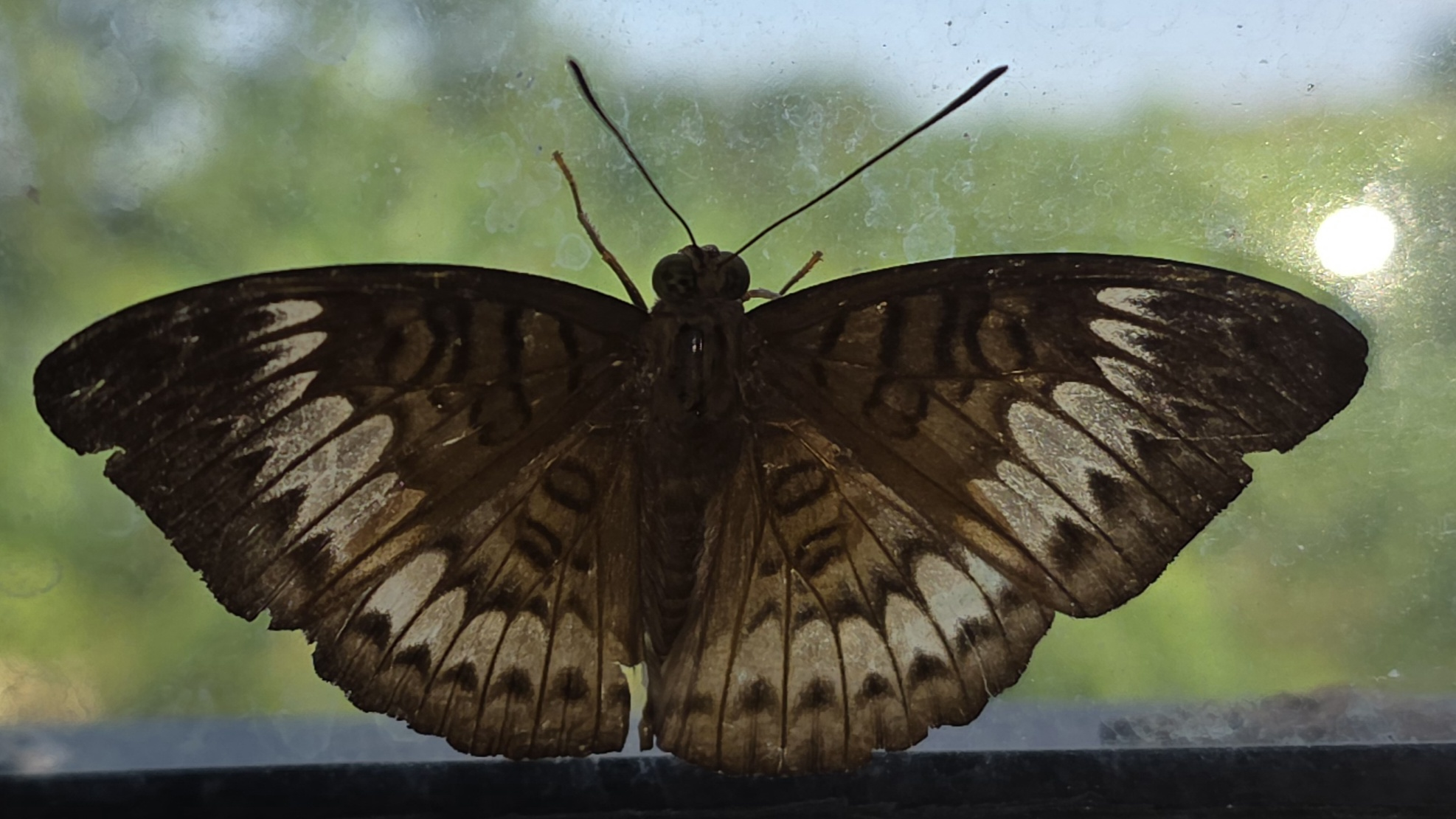
- Tanaecia palguna found in Desa Buduk, Badung Regency, Bali, Indonesia

Scientific classification
- Kingdom: Animalia
- Phylum: Arthropoda
- Clade: Pancrustacea
- Class: Insecta
- Order: Lepidoptera
- Family: Nymphalidae
- Genus: Tanaecia
- Species: T. palguna

Binomial name
- Tanaecia palguna Moore, 1858

= Tanaecia palguna =

Species of butterfly

Tanaecia palguna, commonly known as the long-lined viscount, is a species of butterfly in the family Nymphalidae.

== Taxonomy ==
Tanaecia palguna contains the following subspecies:

- Tanaecia palguna balina
- Tanaecia palguna consanguinea
