= Munchingi Puttu =

- Village
- Interactive map of Munchingi Puttu
- Country: India
- State: Andhra Pradesh
- District: Alluri Sitharama Raju

Languages
  - Official: Telugu
- Time zone: UTC+5:30 (IST)
- Vehicle Registration: AP31, AP32, AP33 (Former); AP39 (from 30 January 2019)

Munchingi puttu is a village and capital of Munchingi puttu mandal in Alluri Sitharama Raju district in the state of Andhra Pradesh in India.
