= Peda Bayalu =

Village in Andhra Pradesh, India

- Village
- Location in Andhra Pradesh, India Peda Bayalu (India)
- Coordinates: 18°17′16″N 82°35′15″E
- Country: India
- State: Andhra Pradesh
- District: Nandyal
- Elevation: 910 m (2,990 ft)

Languages
  - Official: Telugu
- Time zone: UTC+5:30 (IST)
- PIN: 531040
- Vehicle registration: AP

Peda Bayalu (Telugu: పెదబయలు) is a village and headquarters of Peda Bayalu mandal in Alluri Sitharama Raju district, Andhra Pradesh, India.
