= Kidari Sarveswara Rao =

Indian politician

- Died: 23 September 2018; Visakhapatnam, Andhra Pradesh, India
- Occupation: Politician
- Political party: Telugu Desam Party
- Other political affiliations: YSR Congress Party
- Children: Kidari Sravan Kumar(son)

Kidari Sarveswara Rao (died 23 September 2018) was an Indian politician originally representing the YSR Congress Party and later the TDP. He was a Member of the Andhra Pradesh Legislative Assembly from Araku Valley. On 23 September 2018, he was shot dead at Araku valley by Maoists. His son Kidari Sravan Kumar was subsequently elected as State Tribal Welfare Minister without participation in Public Election by TDP Government.
