= Hukumpeta =

Neighbourhood in Andhra Pradesh, India

- Neighbourhood
- Interactive map of Hukumpeta
- Location in Andhra Pradesh, India Hukumpeta (India)
- Coordinates: 18.15097°N 82.692847°E
- Country: India
- State: Andhra Pradesh
- District: Alluri Sitharama Raju
- Mandal: Hukumpeta
- Elevation: 3,000 m (9,800 ft)

Population (2011)
  - Total: 16,985

Languages
  - Official: Telugu
- Time zone: UTC+5:30 (IST)
- PIN: 531077
- Vehicle Registration: AP31 (Former); AP39 (from 30 January 2019)

Hukumpeta is in Hukumpeta mandal, Alluri Sitharama Raju district of the Indian state of Andhra Pradesh. It was a census village and a rural agglomeration constituent of Araku as per 2011 census of India.
