= Chetti Palguna =

Indian politician

Chetti Palguna (born 26 January 1963) is an Indian politician from Andhra Pradesh. He won the 2019 Andhra Pradesh Legislative Assembly election on YSRCP ticket from Araku Assembly constituency in Alluri Sitharama Raju district. He defeated Donnu Dora Siyyari, an independent candidate by a margin of 25,441 votes.

== Early life and education ==
Palguna was born in Seekari village, Araku mandal of the erstwhile Visakhapatnam district. His father is Pakeeru. He completed his post graduation in Political Science from Andhra University, Visakhapatnam. Before joining politics, he was a bank employee. He is working on setting up an industrial park in his constituency.

== Career ==
Palguna joined YSR Congress party in 2014 and contested the general election from Araku Parliamentary constituency representing YSRCP but lost the MP seat to Kothapalli Geetha of TDP. In 2019, he was elected as MLA from the Araku constituency on YSRCP ticket. He was denied a ticket to contest the 2024 Assembly election. But his daughter in law Gumma Thanuja Rani was nominated by YSR Congress party to contest from the Araku Parliamentary constituency.
