= Raghupathi =

Raghupathy, Raghupati or Raghupathi is one of the Indian names.

- Rama, Hindu god, the lord (pati) of the Raghu dynasty
- Raghupathi Surya Prakash, first director in Telugu cinema
- Raghupathi Venkaiah Naidu, one of India's film pioneers and considered the father of Telugu cinema
  - Raghupathi Venkaiah Award, an annual award introduced to recognize people for their lifetime achievements in Telugu cinema
- Raghupathi Venkataratnam Naidu, Indian social reformer and educationist
- K. Raghupati Bhat, Indian politician
- Raghu Dixit or Raghupathy Dixit, Indian musician

== See also ==
- "Raghupati Raghava Raja Ram", a Hindu devotional hymn, popularized by Mahatma Gandhi
- Raghupathi Raghavan Rajaram, 1977 Indian Tamil-language film
