= Janaki Ammal =

Indian botanist (1897–1984)

Her Excellency E. K. Janaki Ammal
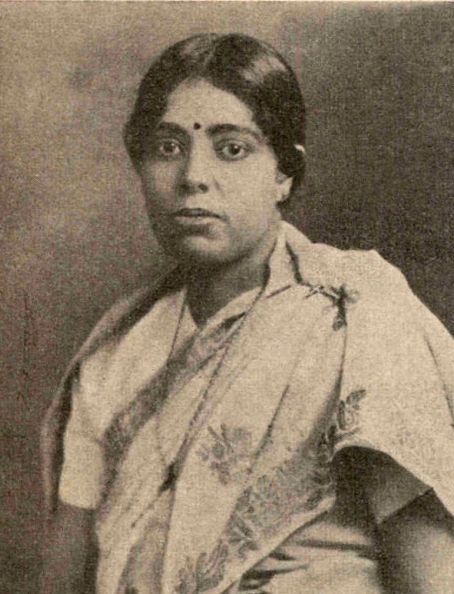
- c. 1938
- Born: 4 November 1897; Tellicherry, Madras Presidency, British India
- Died: 7 February 1984 (aged 86); Madras, Tamil Nadu
- Education: University of Michigan
- Awards: Padma Shri 1977
- Scientific career
- Fields: Botany, Cytology
- Workplaces: Madras University, John Innes Centre
- Thesis: Chromosome Studies in Nicandra physaloides

Edavalath Kakkat Janaki Ammal (formally known as Janaki Ammal) (4 November 1897 – 7 February 1984) was an Indian botanist who worked on plant breeding, cytogenetics and phytogeography. Her most notable work involved studies on sugarcane and the eggplant (brinjal). She also worked on the cytogenetics of a range of plants and co-authored the Chromosome Atlas of Cultivated Plants (1945) with C.D. Darlington. She took an interest in ethnobotany and plants of medicinal and economic value from the rain forests of Kerala, India. Her remarkable research, which led to better cross-breeds of a sweeter variety therefore contributed to India’s sugarcane independence. Ammal is sometimes referred to as the 'woman who sweetened India's sugar cane'. She was awarded Padma Shri in 1977.

== Biography ==
=== Early life and family ===
Janaki Ammal was born in Thalassery, Kerala on 4 November 1897. Her father was Diwan Bahadur Edavalath Kakkat Krishnan, Dy. Collector of Malabar district. Her mother, Devi Kuruvayi daughter of Kunhi Kurumbi Kuruvai. She had several siblings, including the civil servant E.K Govindan.

Although her sisters all entered arranged marriages, Janaki chose a life of scholarship and study over matrimony, an uncommon move for a woman.

=== Education and career ===
Ammal did her primary schooling at Sacred Heart Convent in Thalassery followed by a bachelor's degree which she obtained from Queen Mary's College, Madras. She obtained an honours degree in botany from Presidency College in Madras (present-day Chennai) and then moved to the University of Michigan in 1924, earning a master's degree in botany in 1926 through the Barbour Scholarship. She returned to India to work as a professor in Women's Christian College in Madras for a few years, then returned to the University of Michigan as an Oriental Barbour Fellow and obtained a PhD in 1931. Her thesis was titled "Chromosome Studies in Nicandra Physaloides". The university also awarded her an honorary LLD in 1956.

On her return, she became Professor of Botany at the Maharaja's College of Science in Trivandrum (present-day University College, Trivandrum) and served as an Assistant Professor for two years between 1932 and 1934. Ammal then joined the John Innes Institute in Merton, London, where she worked with C. D. Darlington, who would become a long-term collaborator. She then worked at the Sugarcane Breeding Institute in Coimbatore and worked with C.A. Barber. Her work involved the production of hybrids including several intergeneric crosses including the variety SG 63–32.

In 1939 she attended the 7th International Congress of Genetics, Edinburgh and was forced to stay on due to World War II. She then spent the next six years at the John Innes Centre as an assistant cytologist to C.D. Darlington. Together they published a Chromosome Atlas of Cultivated Plants in 1945. She was invited to work as a cytologist at the Royal Horticultural Society, Wisley from 1945 to 1951. During this period she studied Magnolias, their cytology and conducted experiment on their hybridization. The Indian government invited her to reorganize the Botanical Survey of India, and she was appointed as the first director of the Central Botanical Laboratory at Allahabad. From 1962, she served as an officer on special duty at Regional Research Laboratory in Jammu. She also worked briefly at Bhabha Atomic Research Centre at Trombay and then settled down in Madras in November 1970, working as an Emeritus Scientist at the Centre for Advanced Study (CAS) in Botany, University of Madras. She lived and worked in the centre's Field Laboratory at Maduravoyal until her death in February 1984.

=== Research ===
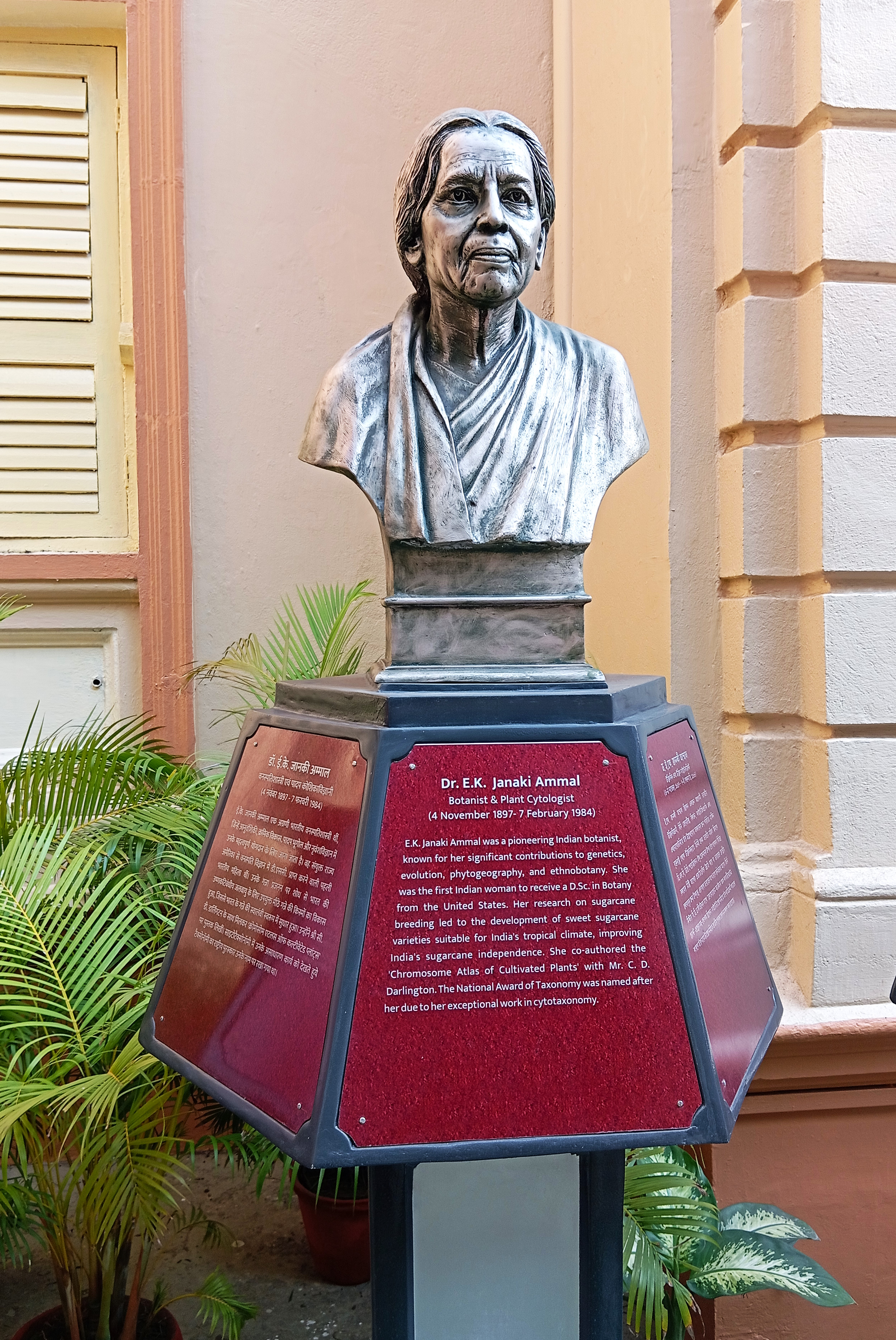
Statue of E. K. Janaki Ammal, Birla Industrial & Technological Museum, Kolkata, West Bengal, India.

As an expert in cytogenetics, Janaki Ammal joined the Sugarcane Breeding Station at Coimbatore to work on sugarcane biology. At that time, the sweetest sugarcane in the world was the Saccharum officianarum variety from Papua New Guinea and India imported it from Southeast Asia. In a bid to improve India's indigenous sugarcane varieties, the Sugarcane Breeding Station had been set up at Coimbatore in the early 1920s. By manipulating polyploid cells through cross-breeding of hybrids in the laboratory, Janaki Ammal was able to create a high yielding strain of the sugarcane that would thrive in Indian conditions. Her research also helped analyse the geographical distribution of sugarcane across India, and to establish that the Saccharum spontaneum variety of sugarcane had originated in India. However, her status as a single woman from a caste considered backward created irreconcilable problems for Dr. Janki Ammal among her male peers at Coimbatore. Impressed by her work, the Royal Horticulture Society invited Janaki Ammal to work as an assistant cytologist at their laboratory at the Wisley Garden in Surrey, England. In 1946, Janaki Ammal became the RHS's first female scientist. Specimens pressed by her are still present at the Wisley Herbarium and her sample of Rhododendron yakushimanum ‘Koichiro Wada’ has become the nomenclatural standard (similar to a type specimen for a species). During her time here, she looked further into the effects of colchicine on various woody plants, including Magnolia. Ammal was highly respected along with her work and also had people sent to her from different countries to study under her. Constance Margaret Eardley, Australian botanist, was one of the individuals who studied under Ammal for a year. Ammal also spoke for the RHS at international conferences. She travelled to Nepal on a plant collection expedition during 1948-1949 and returned to Wisley with specimens (Fragaria, Iris, Rhododendron, Rosa and Rubus).

During the years she spent in England, Ammal did chromosome studies of a wide range of garden plants. Her studies on chromosome numbers and ploidy in many cases threw light on the evolution of species and varieties. The Chromosome Atlas of Cultivated Plants which she wrote jointly with C. D. Darlington in 1945 was a compilation that incorporated much of her own work on many species. At the Society, one of the plants she worked on was the magnolia. To this day, in the society's campus at Wisley there are magnolia shrubs she planted and among them is a variety with small white flowers named after her: Magnolia kobus 'Janaki Ammal'.

Janaki Ammal also worked on the genera Solanum, Datura, Mentha, Cymbopogon, and Dioscorea besides medicinal and other plants. She attributed the higher rate of plant speciation in the cold and humid northeast Himalayas as compared to the cold and dry northwest Himalayas to polyploidy. Also, according to her, the confluence of Chinese and Malayan elements in the flora of northeast India led to natural hybridisation between these and the native flora in this region, contributing further to plant diversification.

Following her retirement, Ammal continued to publish the original findings of her research focusing special attention on medicinal plants and ethnobotany. In the Madras University Field Laboratory where she lived and worked she developed a garden of medicinal plants.

As a geneticist working for the Royal Horticultural Society's Garden Wisley in the early 1950s, Janaki Ammal was investigating the effects of colchicine on a number of woody plants, including Magnolia, where a stock solution in water is made up and applied to the growing tip of young seedlings once the cotyledons (seed leaves) have fully expanded. Doubling of chromosomes occurs, giving the cells twice the usual number. The resulting plants have heavier textured leaves; their flowers are variable, often with thicker tepals, helping them last longer. As Magnolia kobus seeds were available in quantity, a number of seedlings were treated by Dr Janaki Ammal and ultimately planted on Battleston Hill at Wisley.

She also advocated greatly for the preservation of native plants and due to her efforts, Silent Valley Forests was saved from a hydroelectric project. The forest was declared a national park on 15 November 1984 but unfortunately Ammal was not around to see this triumph as she died 9 months earlier (at age 87). This national park is filled with rare varieties of orchids. It had been threatened by flooding and due to Ammal’s efforts, this park is now a popular and flourishing area visited by many tourists.

== Awards and honours ==
Dr. Janaki Ammal is mentioned among Indian Americans of the Century in an India Currents magazine article published on 1 January 2000, by S.Gopikrishna & Vandana Kumar: "In an age when most women didn't make it past high school, would it be possible for an Indian woman to obtain a PhD at one of America's finest public universities and also make seminal contributions to her field?!" Kerala-born Janaki was arguably the first woman to obtain a PhD in botany in the U.S. (1931) and remains one of the few Asian women to be conferred a DSc (honoris causa) by her alma mater, the University of Michigan. During her time at Ann Arbor she lived in the Martha Cook Building, an all-female residence hall and worked with Harley Harris Bartlett, a professor at the Department of Botany.

She was elected Fellow of the Indian Academy of Sciences in 1935, and of the Indian National Science Academy in 1957. The University of Michigan conferred an honorary LL.D. on her in 1956 in recognition of her contributions to botany and cytogenetics said: "Blest with the ability to make painstaking and accurate observations, she and her patient endeavours stand as a model for serious and dedicated scientific workers." The Government of India conferred the Padma Shri on her in 1977. The Ministry of Environment and Forestry of the Government of India instituted the National Award of Taxonomy in her name in 2000.

She produced many hybrid brinjal varieties (the Indian name for eggplant).

Two awards were instituted in her name in 1999: EK Janaki Ammal National Award on Plant Taxonomy and EK Janaki Ammal National Award on Animal Taxonomy. A herbarium with over 25000 plant species in Jammutawi has been named after Janaki Ammal. The John Innes Centre offers a scholarship to PhD students from developing countries in her name.

To honour her work in plant breeding, the Royal Horticultural Society, Wisley, U.K.named a variety of Magnolia she created as Magnolia Kobus 'Janaki Ammal'. In 2018, to celebrate her remarkable career and contribution to plant science, two rose breeders, Girija and Viru Viraraghavan bred a new rose variety which they named E.K. Janaki Ammal.

The name Janakia arayalpathra is also after her.

Her achievements led the John Innes Institute to offer postgraduate scholarships in her name to students from developing countries. India also offers other scholarships in her name.

Sonerila janakiana, a species of plant in the family Melastomataceae, is named after her.

Dravidogecko janakiae, a species of geckos found in India is also named after her.

== See also ==
- E.K Govindan
- E.K Krishnan

== Other sources ==
- S Kedharnath, Edavaleth Kakkat Janaki Ammal (1897–1984), Biographical Memoirs of Fellows of the Indian National Science Academy, 13, pp. 90–101, with portrait (1988).
- P Maheshwari and R N Kapil, Fifty Years of Science in India. Progress of Botany, Indian Science Congress Association, Calcutta, pp. 110, 118 (1963).
- Damodaran, Vinita (2017). "Janaki Ammal, C. D. Darlington and J. B. S. Haldane: Scientific Encounters at the End of Empire", Journal of Genetics, 96 (5), 827–836. doi:10.1007/s12041-017-0844-1
- James, Nirmala (2019). "Janaki Ammal, Aadhya Indian SasyaSasthranja", (Biography of Janaki Ammal), Bhasha Institute (State Institute of Languages), Department of Culture, Government of Kerala, SIL 4606, ISBN 978-81-200-4606-1. Editor: N. S. Arunkumar.
- Savithri Preetha Nair (2023) Chromosome Woman, Nomad Scientist E. K. Janaki Ammal, A Life 1897–1984. Routledge, 650 pp.
