= Achante Bharya =

Malayalam movie

- Poster
- Directed by: Thikkurissy Sukumaran Nair
- Screenplay by: Thikkurissy Sukumaran Nair
- Story by: Vai. Mu. Kothainayaki Ammal
- Produced by: Thikkurissy Sukumaran Nair
- Starring: Adoor Bhasi; K. P. Ummer; Ragini; Thikkurissy Sukumaran Nair
- Cinematography: T. N. Krishnankutty Nair
- Edited by: R. Devarajan
- Music by: V. Dakshinamoorthy
- Production company: Asok Productions
- Release date: 23 July 1971
- Country: India
- Language: Malayalam

Achante Bharya (transl. Father's wife) is a 1971 Indian Malayalam-language film written, directed and produced by Thikkurissy Sukumaran Nair. It is a remake of the Tamil film Chitthi. The film stars Adoor Bhasi, K. P. Ummer, Ragini and Thikkurissy Sukumaran Nair. It was released on 23 July 1971.

== Cast ==
- Adoor Bhasi as Contractor Karunakaran Nair
- K. P. Ummer as Vijayan
- Ragini as Thangamma
- Thikkurissy Sukumaran Nair
- Jose Prakash as Rajan
- Sindhu
- Baby Bindu
- Baby Indira
- Baby Shanthi
- Baby Uma
- Baby Vijaya
- Bahadoor as Balan Nair
- Kayyalam
- Master Raju
- Meena as Adoor Bhasi's Mother
- Menon
- Nellikode Bhaskaran as Thikkurissi's Son
- Pala Thankam as Ragini's Mother
- Vijayasree as Omana
- P. R. Varalakshmi

== Soundtrack ==
The music was composed by V. Dakshinamoorthy and the lyrics were written by Thikkurissy Sukumaran Nair and Irayimman Thampi.

Song	Singers	Lyrics
"Aaariraaro Thamarappoomizhi Pootti" (Pathos)	S. Janaki	Thikkurissy Sukumaran Nair
"Madhuram Madhumadhuram"	K. J. Yesudas	Thikkurissy Sukumaran Nair
"Omanathinkal Kidavo" (Bit)		Irayimman Thampi
"Vaahinee Premavaahinee"	K. J. Yesudas, S. Janaki	Thikkurissy Sukumaran Nair
"Varumo Nee Varumo"	K. J. Yesudas, S. Janaki	Thikkurissy Sukumaran Nair
