= N. Pattabhirama Rao =

Indian Diwan

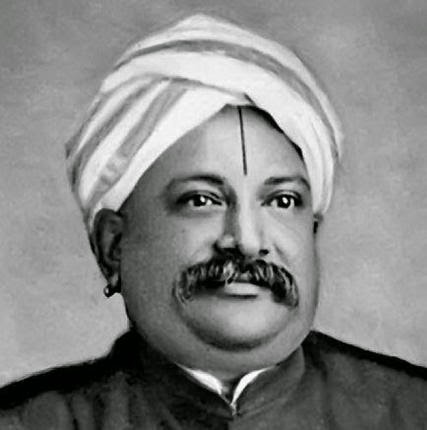
Nemali Pattabhi Portrait

Diwan Bahadur Nemali Pattabhirama Rao Pantulu (born 1862 – 15 October 1937) was an Indian civil servant and administrator who served as the Diwan of Cochin kingdom from 1902 to 1907.

== Early life ==
Pattabhirama Rao was born in a Telugu Brahmin family at Sidhavatam in Cuddapah district in the northern part of the Madras Presidency. His father N. Ramanuja Rao was a tahsildar in the district. Pattabhirama Rao had his early education in Cuddapah and Madras.

== Career ==
Pattabhirama Rao was appointed to the Madras Revenue Settlement Department on 15 April 1882. He served as an Assistant Commissioner from March 1895 to August 1902, when he was appointed Diwan of the Cochin kingdom.

During Pattabhirama Rao's tenure as Diwan, the scientific settlement introduced during the time of his predecessor P. Rajagopalachari were completed. The Cochin-Shoranur Railway and the Cochin tramway were also opened for traffic. Pattabhirama Rao also brought about reforms in the excise administration of the state.
