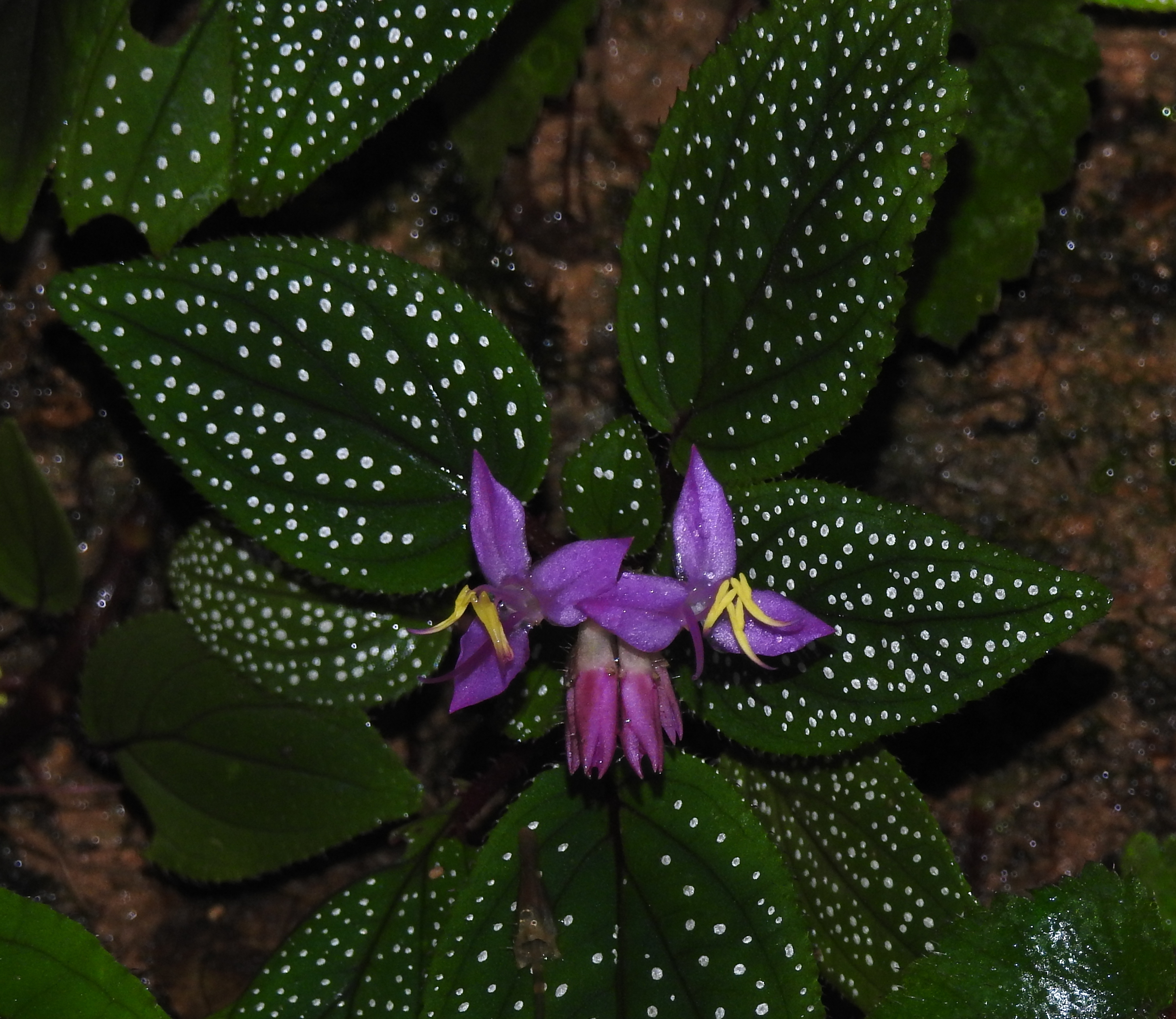
- Sonerila maculata

Scientific classification
- Kingdom: Plantae
- Clade: Tracheophytes
- Clade: Angiosperms
- Clade: Eudicots
- Clade: Rosids
- Order: Myrtales
- Family: Melastomataceae
- Genus: Sonerila; Roxb.

Species
- See text

Synonyms
- Cassebeeria Dennst. ex Kuntze

= Sonerila =

Genus of flowering plants

Sonerila is a genus of plants in the family Melastomataceae. This genus is characterized the by presence of three petals (along with the genera Stussenia and Lithobium) as opposed to five in the other members of the family. Most members of the genus prefer growing in shady habitats. It is a large genus with new species being discovered.

This is primarily an Asiatic genus of the tropical and subtropical regions distributed from India and Sri Lanka to the Indo-Pacific. The members of the group are generally herbs or under shrubs, including some stemless members. Leaves opposite, leaf margin entire or serrulate. Inflorescence usually scorpioid cymes. Flowers in most species purple, some members with reddish or white flowers. Stamens 3, (in one whorl) or rarely 6 (in two whorls). Ovary inferior, 3-celled. Many species of this genus have restricted distribution and very small populations and would thus be regarded as Vulnerable (VU) or Endangered (EN) based on IUCN Red List criteria though this taxon has not yet been assessed for the IUCN Red List.

== Species ==
As of October 2026, Plants of the World Online records 212 accepted species, including:

- Sonerila affinis Arn.
- Sonerila aiensis C.W.Lin
- Sonerila albiflora Stapf & King ex King
- Sonerila amoena Bakh.f.
- Sonerila anaimudica Lundin & B.Nord.
- Sonerila annamica Guillaumin
- Sonerila arguta R.Br. ex Naudin
- Sonerila arnottiana Thwaites
- Sonerila arunachalensis G.S.Giri, A.Pramanik & H.J.Chowdhery
- Sonerila barbata Ridl.
- Sonerila barnesii C.E.C.Fisch.
- Sonerila beccariana Cogn.
- Sonerila belluta Ridl.
- Sonerila bensonii Hook.f.
- Sonerila bicolor Stapf & King
- Sonerila biflora Zoll. & Moritzi
- Sonerila bokorense S.H.Cho & Y.D.Kim
- Sonerila bolavenensis Soulad., Tagane & Suddee
- Sonerila borneensis Cogn.
- Sonerila bracteata Stapf & King
- Sonerila brandisiana Kurz
- Sonerila brunonis Wight & Arn.
- Sonerila buruensis Bakh.f.
- Sonerila calaminthifolia Stapf & King
- Sonerila calophylla Ridl.
- Sonerila calycula Stapf & King
- Sonerila cannanorensis G.S.Giri & M.P.Nayar
- Sonerila cantonensis Stapf
- Sonerila cardamomensis S.H.Cho
- Sonerila celebica Bakh.f.
- Sonerila clarkei Cogn.
- Sonerila coimbatorensis Murug., V.Ravich. & Murugan
- Sonerila cordifolia Cogn.
- Sonerila coriacea Lundin & B.Nord.
- Sonerila corneri Nayar
- Sonerila costulata Stapf & King
- Sonerila crassicaulis Lundin
- Sonerila crassiuscula Stapf
- Sonerila daalenii Bakh.f.
- Sonerila decipiens Bakh.f.
- Sonerila devicolamensis M.P.Nayar
- Sonerila dharii V.Prakash & Mehrotra
- Sonerila dongnathamensis Suddee, Phutthai & Rueangr.
- Sonerila elatostemoides Stapf & King
- Sonerila elegans Wight
- Sonerila elliptica Stapf & King
- Sonerila epeduncula J.Mathew
- Sonerila erecta Jack
- Sonerila exacoides Ridl.
- Sonerila finetii Guillaumin
- Sonerila firma (Thwaites ex C.B.Clarke) Lundin
- Sonerila fraseri Kiew
- Sonerila froidevilleana Bakh.f.
- Sonerila gadgiliana Ratheesh & Sivad.
- Sonerila gamblei G.S.Giri & M.P.Nayar
- Sonerila gardneri Thwaites
- Sonerila gimlettei Ridl.
- Sonerila glaberrima Arn.
- Sonerila glabricaulis (Thwaites ex C.B.Clarke) Lundin
- Sonerila glabriflora Stapf & King
- Sonerila grandiflora R.Br. ex Wall.
- Sonerila grandis Ridl.
- Sonerila griffithii C.B.Clarke
- Sonerila guneratnei Trimen
- Sonerila hainanensis Merr.
- Sonerila harmandii Guillaumin
- Sonerila harveyi Thwaites
- Sonerila helferi C.B.Clarke
- Sonerila heterophylla Jack
- Sonerila hirsuta Ridl.
- Sonerila hirsutissima Aver.
- Sonerila hirsutula Arn.
- Sonerila hirtella Cogn.
- Sonerila hirtiflora Nayar
- Sonerila hookeriana Arn.
- Sonerila impatiens Becc. ex Cogn.
- Sonerila inaequalis Murugan & Manickam
- Sonerila insignis Blume
- Sonerila integrifolia Stapf
- Sonerila janakiana Ratheesh, Sunil & Sivad.
- Sonerila junghuhniana Miq.
- Sonerila kanniyakumariana Gopalan & A.N.Henry
- Sonerila keralensis Deepthikum. & Pandur.
- Sonerila khasiana C.B.Clarke
- Sonerila kinabaluensis Stapf
- Sonerila laeviuscula Zoll. & Moritzi ex Miq.
- Sonerila lanceolata Thwaites
- Sonerila lateritica Resmi, Manudev & Nampy
- Sonerila lecomtei Guillaumin
- Sonerila linearis Hook.f. ex Triana
- Sonerila longipetiolata Josephine, Manickam, Murugan, Sundaresan & Jothi
- Sonerila macrantha Merr.
- Sonerila maculata Roxb.
- Sonerila malabarica Robi, Dantas & Sujanapal
- Sonerila margaritacea Lindl.
- Sonerila metallica C.W.Lin, Chien F.Chen & T.Y.A.Yang
- Sonerila microcarpa Stapf & King
- Sonerila minima Stapf ex Ridl.
- Sonerila mollis Stapf & King
- Sonerila moluccana Roxb.
- Sonerila nagyana Cellin.
- Sonerila nairii Soumya & Maya
- Sonerila nana Ridl.
- Sonerila nayariana Murug. & V.Balas.
- Sonerila neglecta Nayar
- Sonerila nemakadensis C.E.C.Fisch.
- Sonerila neodriessenioides C.Hansen
- Sonerila nervulosa Ridl.
- Sonerila nidularia Stapf & King
- Sonerila nodosa Ridl.
- Sonerila nodulosa Ridl.
- Sonerila nudiscapa Kurz
- Sonerila obliqua Korth.
- Sonerila obovata O.Schwartz
- Sonerila pallida Stapf & King ex King
- Sonerila papuana Cogn.
- Sonerila parameswaranii K.Ravik. & V.Lakshm.
- Sonerila parishii Stapf
- Sonerila parviflora Cogn.
- Sonerila pedunculata O.Schwartz
- Sonerila pedunculosa Thwaites
- Sonerila pilosula Thwaites
- Sonerila plagiocardia Diels
- Sonerila primuloides C.Y.Wu
- Sonerila prostrata Ridl.
- Sonerila pulchella Stapf
- Sonerila pulneyensis Gamble
- Sonerila pumila Thwaites
- Sonerila purpurascens Becc. ex Cogn.
- Sonerila pusilla Ridl.
- Sonerila raghaviana Ratheesh, Sunil, Nandakumar & Shaju
- Sonerila ramosa Ridl.
- Sonerila repens Stapf & King
- Sonerila rheedei Wall. ex Wight & Arn.
- Sonerila rhombifolia Thwaites
- Sonerila robusta Arn.
- Sonerila rotundifolia Bedd.
- Sonerila rubro-villosa O.Schwartz
- Sonerila rudis Stapf & King
- Sonerila rufidula Nayar
- Sonerila ruttenii Bakh.f.
- Sonerila ruttneri Ridl.
- Sonerila sadasivanii Nayar
- Sonerila sahyadrica G.S.Giri & M.P.Nayar
- Sonerila saxosa Stapf & King
- Sonerila scapigera Hook.
- Sonerila secunda R.Br.
- Sonerila silvatica Lundin
- Sonerila speciosa Zenker
- Sonerila spectabilis Nayar
- Sonerila squarrosa Wall.
- Sonerila sreenarayaniana Sunil, Naveen Kum. & Rajeev
- Sonerila stricta Hook.
- Sonerila succulenta Stapf & King
- Sonerila suffruticosa Stapf & King
- Sonerila sulpheyi P.M.Salim & J.Mathew
- Sonerila talbotii G.S.Giri & M.P.Nayar
- Sonerila tenera Royle
- Sonerila tenuifolia Blume
- Sonerila tetraptera Stapf ex Ridl.
- Sonerila tinnevelliensis C.E.C.Fisch.
- Sonerila tomentella Thwaites
- Sonerila travancorica Bedd.
- Sonerila trianae N.P.Balakr.
- Sonerila triflora Cogn.
- Sonerila trinervis Q.W.Lin
- Sonerila tuberculifera Cogn.
- Sonerila tuberosa C.Hansen
- Sonerila urceolata Cellin. & S.S.Renner
- Sonerila vatphouensis Munzinger & C.V.Martin
- Sonerila veldkampiana Ratheesh, Mini & Sivad.
- Sonerila velutina Cogn.
- Sonerila versicolor Wight
- Sonerila verticillata J.A.McDonald
- Sonerila victoriae Soumya & Maya
- Sonerila villosa C.E.C.Fisch.
- Sonerila violifolia Hook.f. ex Triana
- Sonerila virgata O.Schwartz
- Sonerila wallichii Benn.
- Sonerila wightiana Arn.
- Sonerila woodii Merr.
- Sonerila wynaadensis Nayar
- Sonerila zeylanica Wight & Arn.

A further species was described in 2025:

- Sonerila bababudangiriensis Karad. & Kakkal.
