= Anaadhai Penn =

- Directed by: Raghupathi Prakash
- Written by: Somayajulu (Dialogues)
- Screenplay by: Raghupathi Prakash
- Story by: Vai. Mu. Kothainayaki Ammal
- Produced by: M. Somasundaram, Mohideen
- Starring: M. K. Radha; T. A. Sundarambal; P. U. Chinnappa; Kothamangalam Subbu
- Cinematography: Kamal Ghosh
- Edited by: Dharmveer
- Production company: Jupiter Pictures
- Release date: 26 November 1938
- Running time: 3 hrs. 25 mins. (18500 ft.)
- Country: India
- Language: Tamil

Anaadhai Penn (transl. Orphan Girl) is a 1938 Indian Tamil-language film directed by R. Prakash. The film stars M. K. Radha and T. A. Sundarambal. P. U. Chinnappa, who was a budding artiste then, featured as a villain. Kothamangalam Subbu was cast in a comedy role. The film is based on the novel of the same name by Vai. Mu. Kothainayaki Ammal.

== Plot ==
An orphan young girl falls in love with a young man from a rich family. The young man leaves for England for higher studies and the girl faces many hardships. However, finally the young man returns and both are happily united.

== Cast ==
The following list is compiled from The Hindu article and from the database of Film News Anandan.

- M. K. Radha
- T. A. Sundarambal
- P. U. Chinnappa
- S. M. Subramaniam
- L. Narayana Rao
- T. S. Krishnaveni
- P. R. Mangalam
- M. R. Swaminathan
- P. G. Azhvar Kuppusami
- E. Krishnamurthi

== Production ==
Anaadhai Penn was first published as a novel. Jupiter Pictures sought to film the novel and booked M. K. Radha as the hero. Author Vai. Mu. Kothainayaki Ammal insisted that she should be informed from time to time, of the developments in the making of the film. M. K. Radha fully suited his role and was in fact proud of it. After the release of the film, many young people started imitating him. Kothamangalam Subbu was credited as S. M. Subramaniam.

== Soundtrack ==
During the 1930s most of the films did not have a separate music composer. The lyricist set the tune and the artistes sang the songs while the company orchestra provided the background music.

Lyrics for this film were penned by Papanasam Sivan.

No.	Song	Singer/s	Duration (m:ss)
1	Yaararivaar	P. U. Chinnappa	03:18
2	Premai Adhey	M. K. Radha, T. A. Sundarambal	03:17

== Reception ==
The film was a success at the box office. Film historian Randor Guy wrote that the film is "Remembered for: Radha’s performance and his sartorial elegance which became a craze those days, and Kothamangalam Subbu’s comedy."
