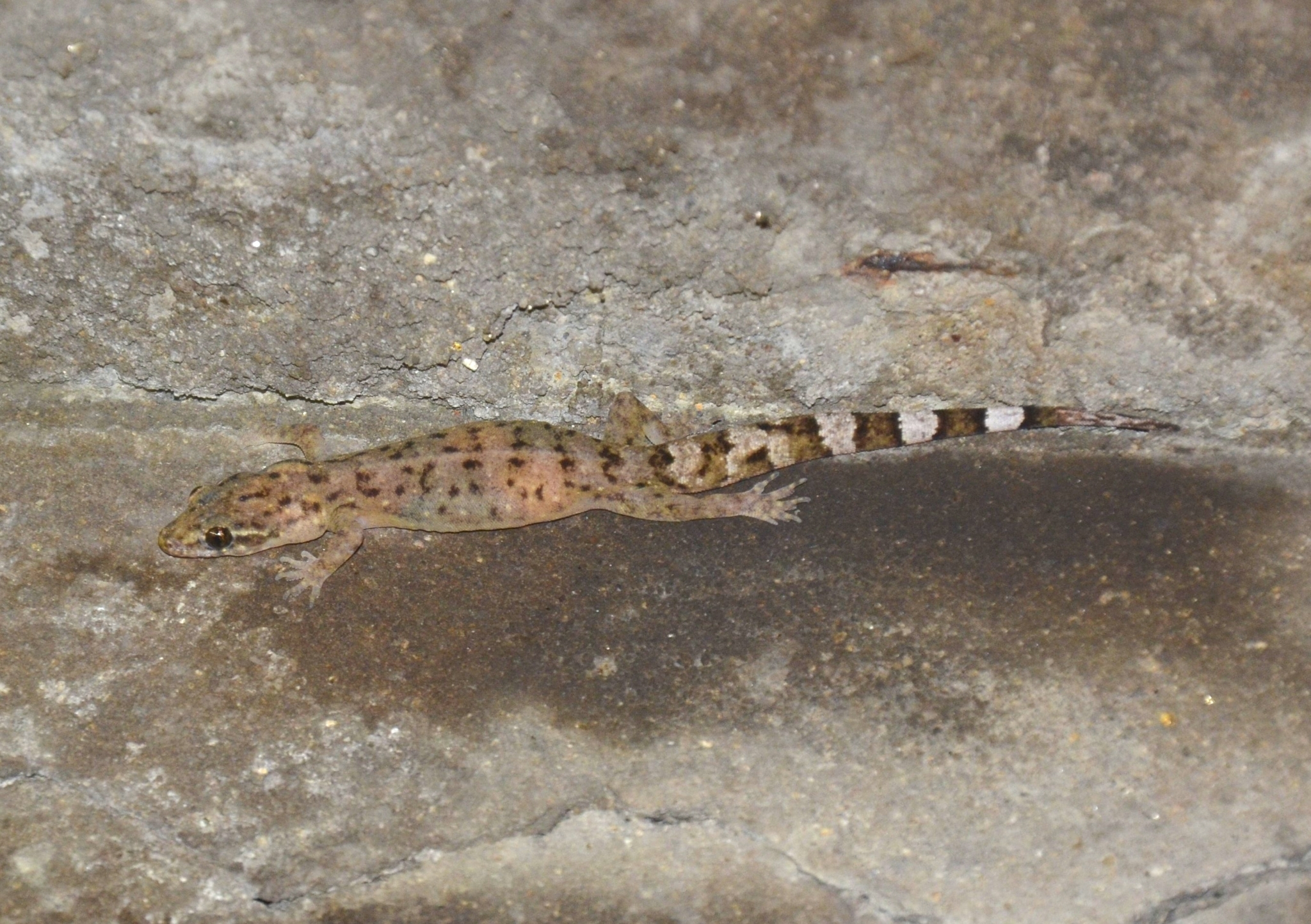
- Dravidogecko anamallensis

Scientific classification
- Kingdom: Animalia
- Phylum: Chordata
- Class: Reptilia
- Order: Squamata
- Suborder: Gekkota
- Family: Gekkonidae
- Subfamily: Gekkoninae
- Genus: Dravidogecko; Smith, 1933
- Dravidogecko septentrionalis Dravidogecko coonoor Dravidogecko anamallensis Dravidogecko janakiae Dravidogecko tholpalli Dravidogecko meghamalaiensis Dravidogecko beddomei Dravidogecko smithi Dravidogecko douglasadamsi

= Dravidogecko =

Genus of lizards

Dravidogecko is a genus of Indian gecko. It includes the following species:

- Anamalay dravidogecko, Dravidogecko anamallensis (Günther, 1875)
- Beddome's dravidogecko, Dravidogecko beddomei (Adhikari, Srikanthan & Ganesh, 2023)
- Coonoor dravidogecko, Dravidogecko coonoor (Abinesh, Naveen, Srikanthan, Babu & Ganesh, 2025)
- Adams’s dravidogecko, Dravidogecko douglasadamsi (Chaitanya, Giri, Deepak, Datta-Roy, Murthy, & Karanth, 2019)
- Janaki’s dravidogecko, Dravidogecko janakiae (Chaitanya, Giri, Deepak, Datta-Roy, Murthy, & Karanth, 2019)
- Meghamalai dravidogecko, Dravidogecko meghamalaiensis (Chaitanya, Giri, Deepak, Datta-Roy, Murthy, & Karanth, 2019)
- Wayanad dravidogecko, Dravidogecko septentrionalis (Chaitanya, Giri, Deepak, Datta-Roy, Murthy, & Karanth, 2019)
- Smith’s dravidogecko, Dravidogecko smithi (Chaitanya, Giri, Deepak, Datta-Roy, Murthy, & Karanth, 2019)
- Kodaikanal dravidogecko, Dravidogecko tholpalli (Chaitanya, Giri, Deepak, Datta-Roy, Murthy, & Karanth, 2019)
