= Dravidogecko tholpalli =

Scientific classification
- Kingdom: Animalia
- Phylum: Chordata
- Class: Reptilia
- Order: Squamata
- Suborder: Gekkota
- Family: Gekkonidae
- Genus: Dravidogecko
- Species: D. tholpalli

Binomial name
- Dravidogecko tholpalli Chaitanya, Giri, Deepak, Datta-Roy, Murthy, & Karanth, 2019

Species of lizard

Dravidogecko tholpalli, also known as the Kodaikanal dravidogecko, is a species of gecko found in India. It is assigned to the genus Dravidogecko.
