= Dravidogecko janakiae =

Scientific classification
- Kingdom: Animalia
- Phylum: Chordata
- Class: Reptilia
- Order: Squamata
- Suborder: Gekkota
- Family: Gekkonidae
- Genus: Dravidogecko
- Species: D. janakiae

Binomial name
- Dravidogecko janakiae Chaitanya, Giri, Deepak, Datta-Roy, Murthy, & Karanth, 2019

Species of lizard

Dravidogecko janakiae, also known as Janaki's dravidogecko, is a species of gecko found in India. The species, discovered in 2019, is named after Indian botanist Janaki Ammal
