= Dravidogecko meghamalaiensis =

Scientific classification
- Kingdom: Animalia
- Phylum: Chordata
- Class: Reptilia
- Order: Squamata
- Suborder: Gekkota
- Family: Gekkonidae
- Genus: Dravidogecko
- Species: D. meghamalaiensis

Binomial name
- Dravidogecko meghamalaiensis Chaitanya, Giri, Deepak, Datta-Roy, Murthy, & Karanth, 2019

Species of lizard

Dravidogecko meghamalaiensis, also known as the Meghamalai dravidogecko, is a species of gecko found in India.
