= Bhishma Pratigna (1921 film) =

1921 Indian silent film

- భీష్మ ప్రతిజ్ఞ
- Directed by: Raghupathi Surya Prakash
- Produced by: Raghupathi Surya Prakash; Raghupathi Venkaiah Naidu
- Starring: Ragupathi Surya Prakash; Peggy Castello
- Production company: Star of the East
- Release date: 1921
- Country: India
- Language: Silent
- Budget: ₹12,000
- Box office: ₹60,000

Bhishma Pratigna (transl. The oath of Bhishma) is a 1921 Indian Hindu mythological silent film directed by Raghupathi Surya Prakash (R. S. Prakash). Produced by Surya Prakash and his father Raghupathi Venkaiah Naidu under the Star of the East production company, the film stars Surya Prakash as Bhishma and Peggy Castello as Ganga. It is widely recognised as the first Telugu feature film and is also considered by some film historians to be the first feature film produced in South India. The film was released across India, Burma, and Sri Lanka, and was a significant success. Made on a budget of ₹12,000 (worth ₹2.2 crore in 2021 prices), it earned ₹60,000 in returns.

== Cast ==
- Raghupathi Surya Prakash as Bhishma
- Peggy Castello as Ganga
- Bunny Osten
- A. Narayanan

== Production ==
Bhishma Pratigna is notable for being the first film made by a Telugu producer. Raghupathi Venkaiah Naidu sent his son, Raghupathi Surya Prakash (R. S. Prakash), abroad to study filmmaking. Prakash trained at Barker Motion Photography in Ealing, London, and furthered his studies in Paris (Pathé), Germany (where he observed F. W. Murnau's work), and Hollywood. Upon returning to India, Prakash established Star of the East, the first Telugu-owned film production company. In 1921, the father-son duo produced Bhishma Pratigna, with Prakash directing and starring in the title role, while English actress Peggy Castello played Ganga.

The pair went on to produce other films such as Matsyavatar and Nandanar (1923), and Gajendra Moksham (1923). Notable filmmakers C. Pullayya and Y. V. Rao began their careers as followers of Prakash.
