= V. Thirumalai Pillai =

Indian politician

Dewan Bahadur V. Thirumalai Pillai was an Indian politician from Vanniyar Community and Served as the President of the Madras Corporation from 1923 to 1924. He was a member of the Justice Party. Pillai also served as trustee of Pachaiyappa Charities and a member of the committee of management of Chengalvaraya Naicker's Technical Institute, one of the pioneer institutions in the city of Madras of promoting technical education. He along with Sir P.Theagaraya Chetti took great plans to reorganize the institute according to modern requirement.. He was Director of The South Indian People's Association. He was also one of the promotors of The South Indian Liberal Federation. He was Honorary Secretary of Cosmopolitan Club and The Union Club. He was also conductor of Sugua Vilas Sabha. He was also Director of Egmore Benefit Society.

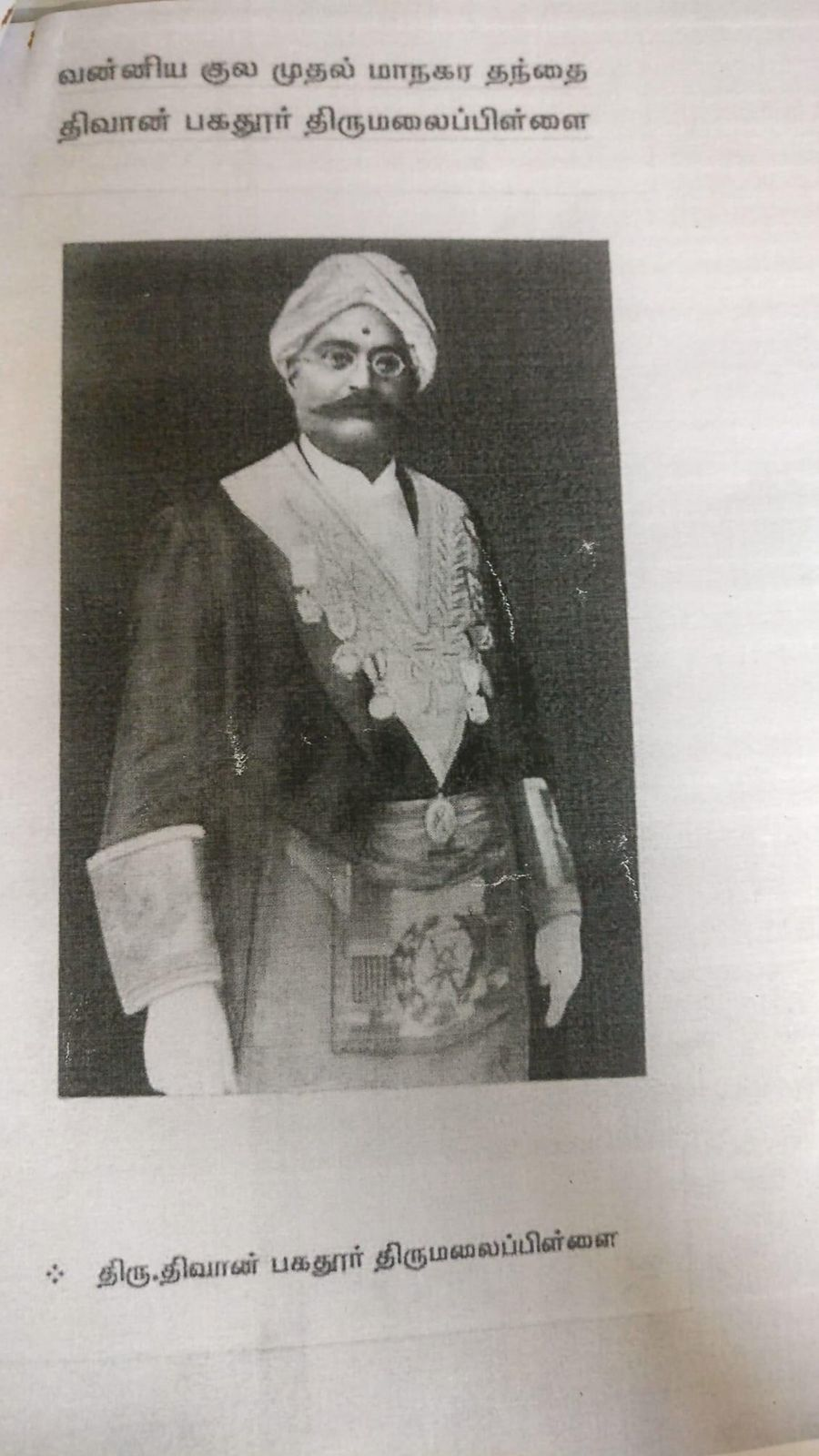
