= Chitthi =

1966 film by K. S. Gopalakrishnan

- Theatrical release poster
- Directed by: K. S. Gopalakrishnan
- Screenplay by: K. S. Gopalakrishnan
- Based on: Dayanidhi by Vai. Mu. Kothainayaki Ammal
- Starring: Padmini; Gemini Ganesan
- Cinematography: R. Sampath
- Edited by: R. Devarajan
- Music by: M. S. Viswanathan
- Production company: Chitra Productions
- Release date: 14 January 1966
- Running time: 170 minutes
- Country: India
- Language: Tamil

Chitthi (transl. Stepmother) is a 1966 Indian Tamil-language drama film written and directed by K. S. Gopalakrishnan. The film stars Padmini and Gemini Ganesan. It is based on the play Dayanidhi written by Vai. Mu. Kothainayaki Ammal. The film was released on 14 January 1966. It was remade in Hindi as Aurat (1967), in Telugu as Pinni (1967), in Kannada as Chikkamma (1969), and in Malayalam as Achante Bharya (1971).

== Plot ==
Meenakshi, the eldest daughter of a family of six sisters and one brother Balu, has one dream in her life, ensuring that Balu becomes an MBBS doctor. She has taken up job of domestic help to make both ends meet. However, she often struggles to pay her brothers tuition fees and ask for help from her employers and even her love interest, Muthaiya. But, unfortunately, there comes a situation where she is in desperate need of ₹1,000 (equivalent to ₹66,000 or US$680 in 2026) to pay Balu's college fees, and no one is able to lend her that money, including Muthaiya.

In this turbulent situation, a marriage broker brings home a marriage alliance for Meenakshi from a millionaire widower named Periyasamy. Though not completely evil, Periyasamy is full of greed, arrogance, lust and attracted towards Meenakshi's beauty, He takes advantage of Meenakshi's poverty and her need for money to his favour. Meenakshi family, especially Balu, initially rebels against this marriage with Periyasamy and begs her sister not to marry Periayasamy and guarantees that he would work hard to bring her a right match. But Meenakshi firmly says that marriage cannot be avoided as she needs to take care of Balu's studies, which would help him become a doctor and earn money to take care of his sisters future. Balu gives in and Meenakshi and Periyasamy gets married in a simple function.

Periyasamy has a big family; he has old mother and 7-8 children. The eldest son Mani is against his greed and arrogant behaviour and stays outside his bungalow. Periyasamy has a grown up daughter name Saroja, who takes immediate interest in Meenakshi brother Balu. Both are attracted towards each other. Periyasamy has 6 other children and youngest being 1 year old baby. Initially Periysaamy mother and children are hesitant to accept Meenakshi as Step-mother "chitti". But with her genuine and unconditional love, Meenakshi wins all their hearts. They children and mother-in-law accepts Meenakshi whole-heartedly.

Periyasamy is unhappy that Meenakshi is avoiding getting closer to him in the pretext of taking care of the children especially the one year old baby. He accuses her several times that she is using the kids as excuses to have relationship with him; He forces her to go to hotel to spend a night with him in a taxi. Mani drives the taxi and over hears the conversation with Periyasamy and Meenakshi and learns how kind hearted genuine person she is. Mani changes his opinion about Meenakshi and bonds with her.

One fine day, Periyasamy gets hold of Saroja and Balu red-handedly and throws Balu out of his residence. Despite Meenakshi request, Periyasamy refuses to help Balu with his studies any further and stops supporting her family . Balu is forced to look out for job to feed his sisters; At this juncture, Balu meets Mani who gives him a job as car cleaner. Balu readily accepts this job and thanks Mani for saving his family from starving.

Mani overhears Balus call with his sister Saroja and decides to unite them. Mani also understands that Meenakshi has not been eating as she was thinking that her family is starving after Periyasamy stopped supporting them. Mani calls up Meenakshi to comfort her saying that he would take care of the family as well Balus final year studies.

Finally the time comes to pay final year college fees for Balu and Mani is unable to collect the funds required to support Balu. Saroja then finally says that she would go to hotel to make some money . This was initially misunderstood by the VK Ramasamy son, VR Rajgopal that she is doing unethical job in the hotel to make money. Using the money Saroja gets from the stranger in the hotel, Balu is able to finish his college. In the meantime, Periysamy arranges marriage proposal for Saroja with Marudhu pillai (VK Ramasamy) son Anand(VR Rajgopal). When VR Rajagopal meets Saroja, he refuses the marriage proposal citing that he has seen Saroja several times getting money in hotel from stranger by unethical means. He also states that the taxi driver has witnessed that Saroja has visited hotel many times. Marudhu pillai insults Periyasamy and questions Sarojas character. Mani and saroja confirms that indeed Saroja has been to hotel to get money to sponsor Balus education. Meenakshi listens to Manis Sarojas confession and gets terribly upset and angry; she becomes violent listening to this accusation and beats up saroja. Then Mani interferes and clarifies the ambiguity behind saroja visiting hotel.

Mani clarifies that Saroja was meeting Muthiah (Gemini ganesan, Meenakshi former lover) who has now become a millionaire and helped paying the college fees. He won the family case and gained 4 lak rupees in his favour; Using that money he has built the hotel; Saroja met Muthiah in his hotel to get help to pay Balus college fees . This clears the air and every one realises their mistake, including Periyasamy. Periyasamy repents. Marudhu pillai apologises. Pariyasamy apologises to Balu and unites Saroja with him; Muthiah walks in and Meenakshi thanks him for the timely help. Muthiah shares the news that he has married a girl and introduces her to every, who is none other than Meenakshi's dumb sister. Meenakshi is overwhelmed with joy to see her sister married to Muthiah and her brother Balu united with Saroja. Story ends.

== Cast ==
- Padmini as Meenakshi
- Gemini Ganesan as Muthaiyya
- Muthuraman as Balu
- Nagesh as Mani
- M. R. Radha as Periyasamy
- V. K. Ramasamy
- V. R. Rajagopal
- V. S. Raghavan
- Vijaya Nirmala as Saroja
- Vijayasree
- Sundari Bai as Periyasamy's mother
- S. D. Subbulakshmi
- Radha Bai
- Baby Rani

== Production ==
Chitthi is an adaptation of the play Dayanidhi written by Vai. Mu. Kothainayaki Ammal. Cinematography was handled by R. Sampath, and editing by R. Devarajan. Padmini initially recommended Srividya for the character of her mute sister for which she practised being mute in home; however she was replaced by Vijayasree.

== Themes ==
According to N. Kalyan Raman's essay "Dream world: Reflections on Cinema and Society in Tamil Country", Chitthi subverts the wicked stepmother trope by making the titular stepmother a figure of suffering and sacrifice, protecting her stepchildren from her callous and irresponsible husband.

== Soundtrack ==
Music was composed by M. S. Viswanathan.

Song	Singer	Lyrics	Length
"Thaneer Suduvathenna"	T. M. Soundararajan P. Susheela	Kannadasan	4:02
"Kalamithu Kalamithu"	P. Susheela	Kannadasan	6:09
"Ingey Deivam Pathi"	A. L. Raghavan Mothi	Kannadasan	4:23
"Santhipoma Indru"	P. B. Sreenivas L. R. Eswari	Kannadasan	3:48
"Santhipoma Indru" (Sad)	P. B. Sreenivas L. R. Eswari	Kannadasan	3:06
"Maarum Kanni Manam"	P. Susheela	Kannadasan	1:42
"Cycle Vandi Mele"	Sirkazhi Govindarajan	Udumalai Narayana Kavi	3:49

== Release and reception ==
Chitthi was released on 14 January 1966. T. M. Ramachandran of Sport and Pastime positively reviewed the film praising Gopalakrishnan's direction and also praised the cast and crew members of the film. Kalki criticised the film for lack of originality, felt Gemini Ganesan was underutilised and M. R. Radha's acting lacked newness.

== Remakes ==
Chitthi was remade in Hindi as Aurat (1967), in Telugu as Pinni (1967), in Kannada as Chikkamma (1969) and in Malayalam as Achante Bharya (1971).
