= Sonerila bababudangiriensis =

Scientific classification
- Kingdom: Plantae
- Clade: Tracheophytes
- Clade: Angiosperms
- Clade: Eudicots
- Clade: Rosids
- Order: Myrtales
- Family: Melastomataceae
- Genus: Sonerila
- Species: S. bababudangiriensis

Binomial name
- Sonerila bababudangiriensis Karad. & Kakkal.

Species of plant

Sonerila bababudangiriensis is a species of plant endemic to western ghats in India. As of 23 July 2025, the species was not listed by Plants of the World Online.

== Etymology ==
This species of Sonerila is named after its type locality Babubudangiri hills of Karnataka.

== Description ==
This shrub is perennial and grows 8 to 15 cm high. The leaves are 3 to 5 cm in length and 5 to 8 cm long. The leaves are serrate with green color on the top and purple-red underneath. The flowers are pale pink in color. They can be differentiated by similar looking Sonerila wallichii by combination of relatively smaller leaves, paler flower color and single inflorescence apart from other characteristics. The flowering and fruiting season is from July to October.

This species' conservation status was determined to be Data Deficient as only one population was found from the peak of Bababudangiri hills.
