= Chikkamma =

- Directed by: R. Sampath
- Written by: Kunigal Nagabhushan (dialogues)
- Screenplay by: R. Sampath
- Story by: V.M.K.
- Produced by: M. Chandra Kumar; B. V. Anand
- Starring: Rajkumar; Jayanthi; Balakrishna; Narasimharaju
- Cinematography: K. Jayaram
- Edited by: B. Gopala Rao
- Music by: T. V. Raju
- Production company: S V S Film Combines
- Distributed by: S V S Film Combines
- Release date: 9 September 1969
- Running time: 137 min
- Country: India
- Language: Kannada

Chikkamma is a 1969 Indian Kannada-language film, directed by R. Sampath and produced by M. Chandra Kumar and B. V. Anand. The film stars Rajkumar, Jayanthi, Balakrishna and Narasimharaju. It had musical score by T. V. Raju. Chikkamma is a remake of 1966 movie Chitthi.

== Cast ==
- Rajkumar as Sundar
- Jayanthi as Meenakshi
- Balakrishna as "Gundlupete" Gundappa
- Narasimharaju as Vishwa
- Srinath as Balu, Meenakshi's brother
- T. B. Nagappa
- Hanumanthachar
- Ganapathi Bhat
- Bangalore Nagesh
- T. R. Narayan
- Mahadevappa
- Master Srikrishna Kumar
- Master Shekar
- Master Srinivas
- M. N. Lakshmidevi
- Shanthamma
- Sabitha
- Mallika
- Rathnamala
- Jayalakshmi
- Ranjanadevi
- Baby Uma
- Baby Raju
- Vijayalalitha

== Soundtrack ==
The music was composed by T. V. Raju with lyrics written by R. N. Jayagopal.
