= Neervalur =

Neighbourhood in Kanchipuram district, Tamil Nadu, India

Neervalur Sri Bhashyapuram
- Village
- Neervalur, Kanchipuram district, Tamil Nadu
- Coordinates: 12.8783°N 79.7868°E
- Country: India
- State: Tamil Nadu
- Elevation: 89.72 m (294.4 ft)

Languages
  - Official: Tamil
- Time zone: UTC+5:30 (IST)
- PIN: 631561
- Vehicle registration: TN-21

Neervalur is a village located around 15 km from Kanchipuram, in the Indian state of Tamil Nadu. It is known for its Veetrirundha Lakshmi Narayana Perumal Temple which is stated to be 500 years old. This temple is maintained under the control of Hindu Religious and Charitable Endowments Department, Government of Tamil Nadu. This temple also has a shrine for Lord Jwala Narasimha.

== Legend ==
It was also known as Sri Bashyapuram in the past, a reference to Sri Bhashya written by Saint Ramanuja. Even today, the temple comes under the control of Ahobila Mutt.

== Notable people ==
The village was the birthplace of Vai. Mu. Kothainayaki Ammal (1901-1960), a Tamil writer, novelist, and journalist t who was the first woman to occupy the editorial board of a Tamil magazine.
