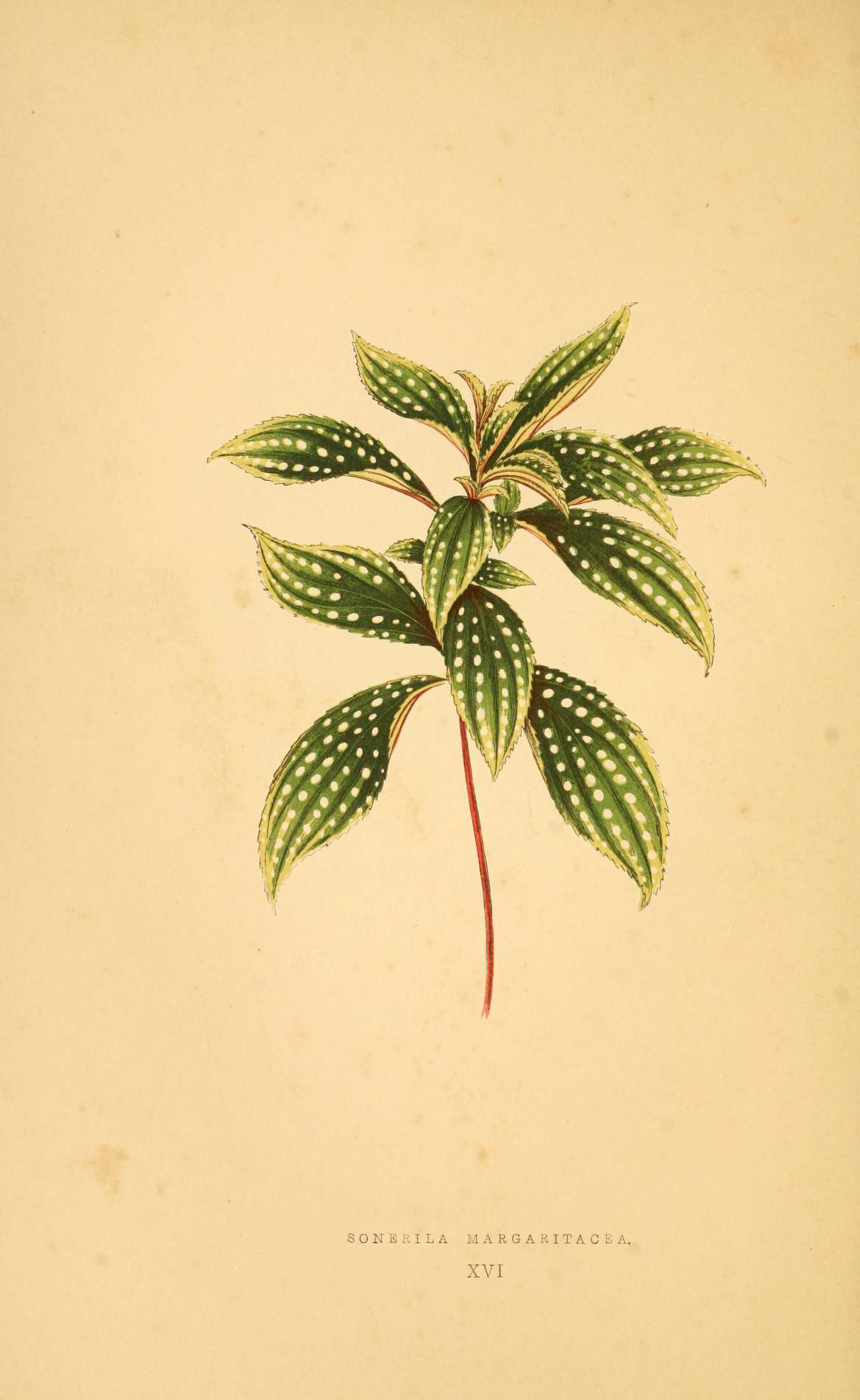
- Botanical illustration

Scientific classification
- Kingdom: Plantae
- Clade: Embryophytes
- Clade: Tracheophytes
- Clade: Angiosperms
- Clade: Eudicots
- Clade: Rosids
- Order: Myrtales
- Family: Melastomataceae
- Genus: Sonerila
- Species: S. margaritacea

Binomial name
- Sonerila margaritacea Lindl.

Synonyms
- List: Cassebeeria margaritacea Krasser; Cassebeeria margaritacea Kuntze; Sonerila hendersonii E.G.Hend.; Sonerila hendersonii Cogn.; Sonerila mamei Linden

= Sonerila margaritacea =

Species of flowering plant

Sonerila margaritacea is a species of flowering plant in the genus Sonerila, native to Myanmar. An evergreen perennial with patterned leaves, reaching only 10 cm (3.9 in), it has gained the Royal Horticultural Society's Award of Garden Merit as a terrarium or hothouse ornamental.
