= E. K. Krishnan =

1841 - 1907

Diwan Bahadur E.K. Krishnan

Kannur, Thalassery ദിവാൻ
- Monarch: Madras Presidency

Personal details
- Born: 1841
- Died: 1907 (aged 65–66)
- Occupation: Civil servant, administrator

Diwan Bahadur Edavalath Kakkat Krishnan, (1841–1907) Thalassery in Kannur, served as a sub-judge in the Madras Court in 1861 and as an English writer in the Thalassery Civil Court and municipal chair. In 1896 he retired from the British administration with the service of Deputy Collector of Malabar and Diwan of Malabar. He was the father of the botanist Janaki Ammal.
