= Dravidogecko smithi =

Scientific classification
- Kingdom: Animalia
- Phylum: Chordata
- Class: Reptilia
- Order: Squamata
- Suborder: Gekkota
- Family: Gekkonidae
- Genus: Dravidogecko
- Species: D. smithi

Binomial name
- Dravidogecko smithi Chaitanya, Giri, Deepak, Datta-Roy, Murthy, & Karanth, 2019

Species of lizard

Dravidogecko smithi, also known as Smith's dravidogecko, is a species of gecko found in India.
