= E. K. Govindan =

Thalassery notable (1875–1944)

EK Govindan
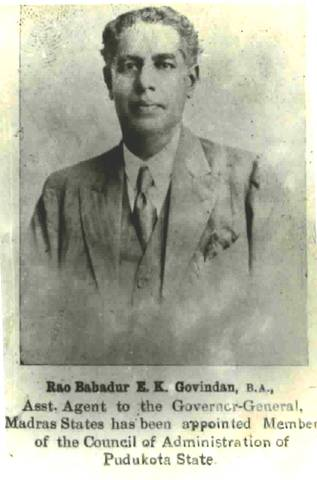
- EK Govindhan, 1900
- Born: 1875; Thalassery, India
- Died: 1944 (aged 68–69)
- Occupation: Civil servant

Rao Bahadur Dewan E.K. Govindan (1875–1944) was a Thalassery notable who ruled as the first malayali man to govern Pudukkottai administratively, before serving as the Dewan of Pudukottai. He was an English writer and civil servant.

== Biography ==
E.K. Govindan was born in Thalassery in 1875 as the son of Dewan EK Krishnan and Devi Kuru of the famous Idavalat Kakkat family. His sister was Janaki Ammal, who was one of the first Indian women to earn a doctorate in science in British India and to win the Barbour Fellowship from the East.

After graduating with a degree in education, E.K Govindan assumed the post of Dewan of the British Presidency of Pudukottai. Govindan was the second member of this family after his father to enter the British service. He was promoted first as Political Agent and later as Administrator of the Pudukkottai State before working under the East India Company.
