= Sonerila janakiana =

Scientific classification
- Kingdom: Plantae
- Clade: Tracheophytes
- Clade: Angiosperms
- Clade: Eudicots
- Clade: Rosids
- Order: Myrtales
- Family: Melastomataceae
- Genus: Sonerila
- Species: S. janakiana

Binomial name
- Sonerila janakiana Ratheesh, Sunil & Sivad.

Species of plant

Sonerila janakiana is a species of flowering plant in the genus Sonerila. It is a tuberous, scapigerous and stoloniferous plant species.

== Distribution and habitat ==
Native to Tamil Nadu and Kerala, India. it is primarily flourishes in the wet tropical environment.

== Etymology ==
The species is named to honor Janaki Ammal Edathil Kakkat, an Indian botanist.
