= Lodd Govindoss Chathurbhujadoss =

Indian businessman

Diwan Bahadur "Lodd" Govindoss Chathurbhujadoss was a Gujarati businessman from Madras. He was the owner of C. Kushaldoss and Sons and served as Sheriff of Madras.

== Personal life ==
Chathurbhujadoss was the son of Chathurbhujadoss Kushaldoss, the founder of the C. Kushaldoss and Sons, a textile firm based in the city of Madras. The Kushaldoss family had migrated from North India and had settled in the city. Apart from the textile business, the Kushaldoss family traded in silk, musk and spices and were the agents of Burmah Shell in the Madras Presidency. The family also ran a successful banking business.

== Public activities ==
Chathurbhujadoss was involved in various philanthropic activities throughout his life. In 1906, he contributed Rs. 10,000 towards a statue of Edward VII in front of Government Estate and commissioned another of George V during his silver jubilee celebrations in 1935. He donated land for the Madras Pinjrapole, a home for old and sick animals at Ayanavaram in 1906 and gifted a property called Umda Bagh in Binny Road to the government on which the Quaid-e-Milleth Government Arts College for Women was later built.
