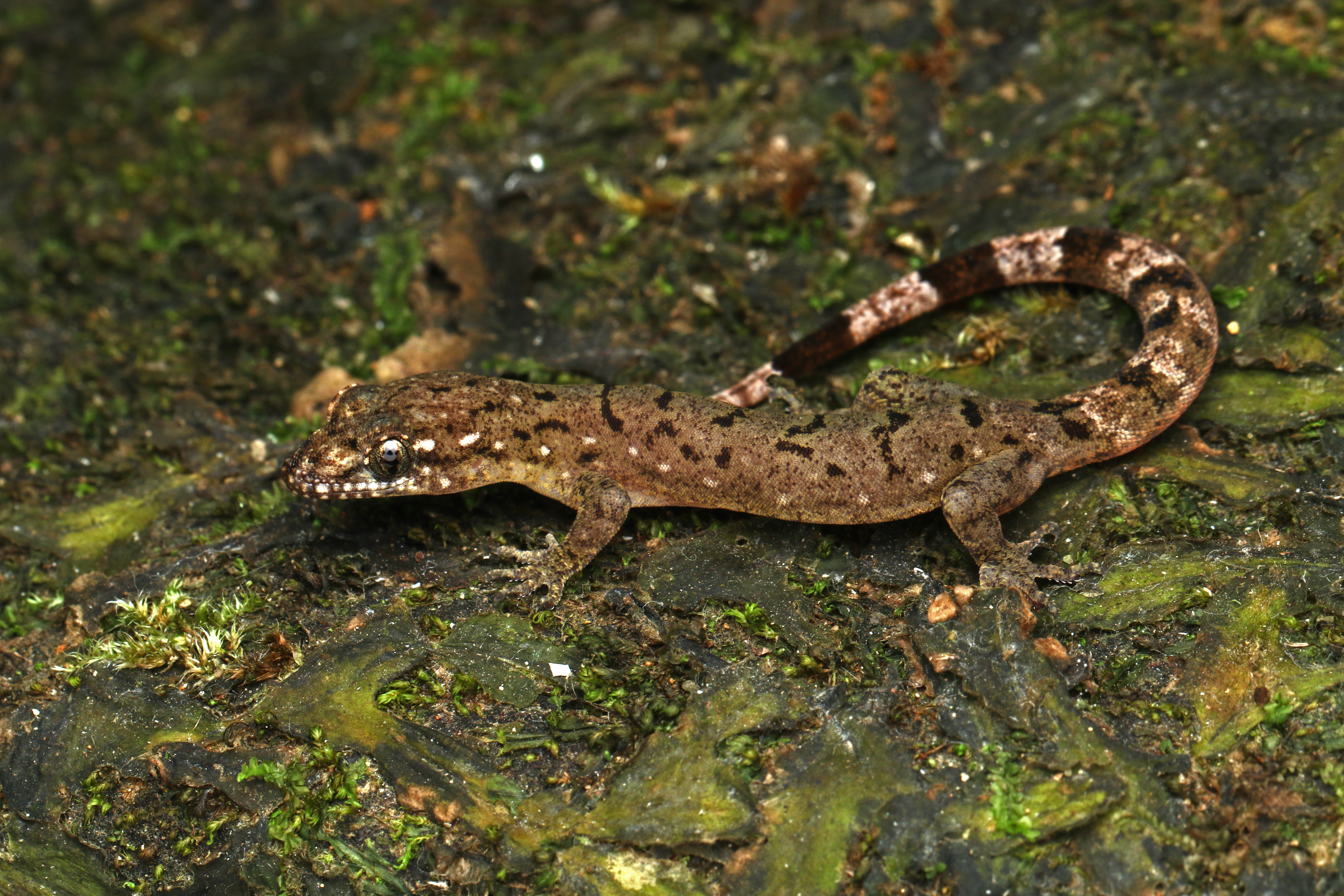

Scientific classification
- Kingdom: Animalia
- Phylum: Chordata
- Class: Reptilia
- Order: Squamata
- Suborder: Gekkota
- Family: Gekkonidae
- Genus: Dravidogecko
- Species: D. septentrionalis

Binomial name
- Dravidogecko septentrionalis Chaitanya, Giri, Deepak, Datta-Roy, Murthy, & Karanth, 2019

= Dravidogecko septentrionalis =

Species of lizard

Dravidogecko septentrionalis, also known as the Wayanad dravidogecko, is a species of gecko found in India. It is assigned to the genus Dravidogecko.
