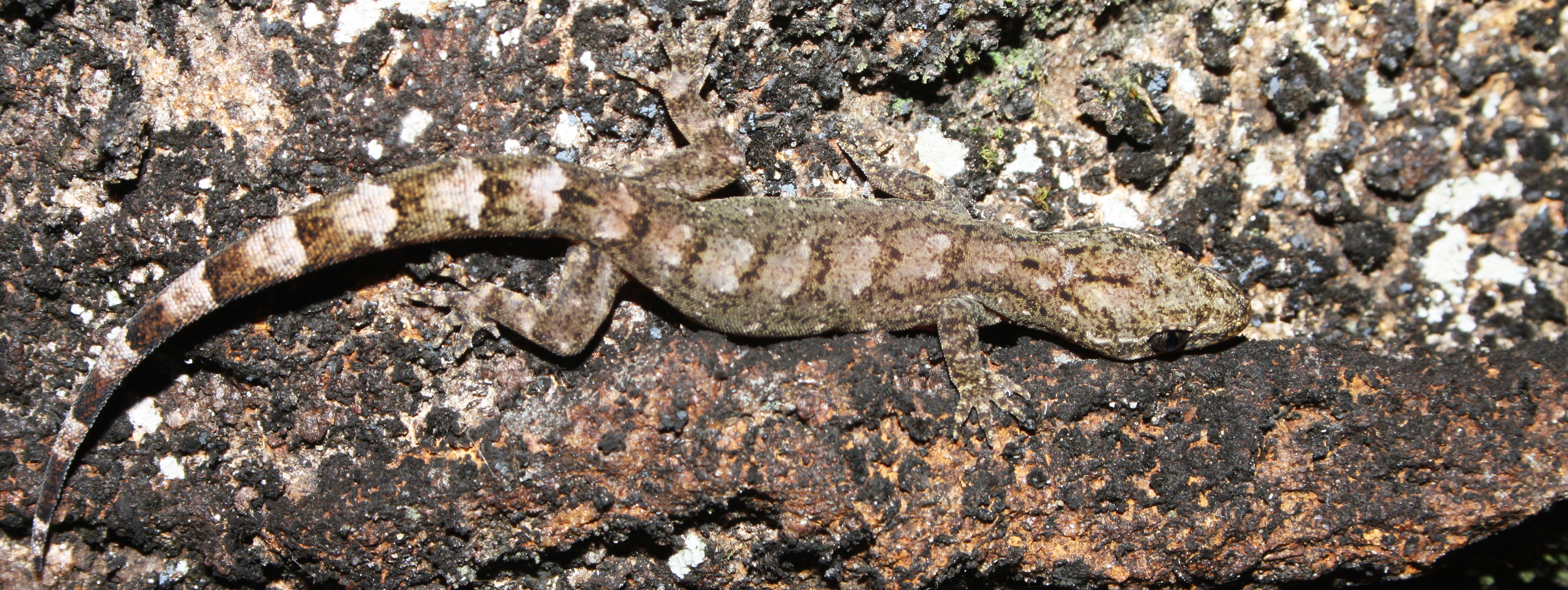

Scientific classification
- Kingdom: Animalia
- Phylum: Chordata
- Class: Reptilia
- Order: Squamata
- Suborder: Gekkota
- Family: Gekkonidae
- Genus: Dravidogecko
- Species: D. douglasadamsi

Binomial name
- Dravidogecko douglasadamsi Chaitanya, Giri, Deepak, Datta-Roy, Murthy, & Karanth, 2019

= Dravidogecko douglasadamsi =

Species of lizard

Dravidogecko douglasadamsi, also known as Adams's dravidogecko, is a species of gecko found in India.
