= Sonerila bolavenensis =

Scientific classification
- Kingdom: Plantae
- Clade: Embryophytes
- Clade: Tracheophytes
- Clade: Angiosperms
- Clade: Eudicots
- Clade: Rosids
- Order: Myrtales
- Family: Melastomataceae
- Genus: Sonerila
- Species: S. bolavenensis

Binomial name
- Sonerila bolavenensis Soulad., Tagane & Suddee

Species of flowering plant

Sonerila bolavenensis is a species of flowering plant in the genus Sonerila first described in May 2021. It is found in the Bolaven Plateau in Laos. It is small and has a height of 1.2–3 cm (0.47–1.18 in).

It is similar to Sonerila vatphouensis and Sonerila tuberosa.
