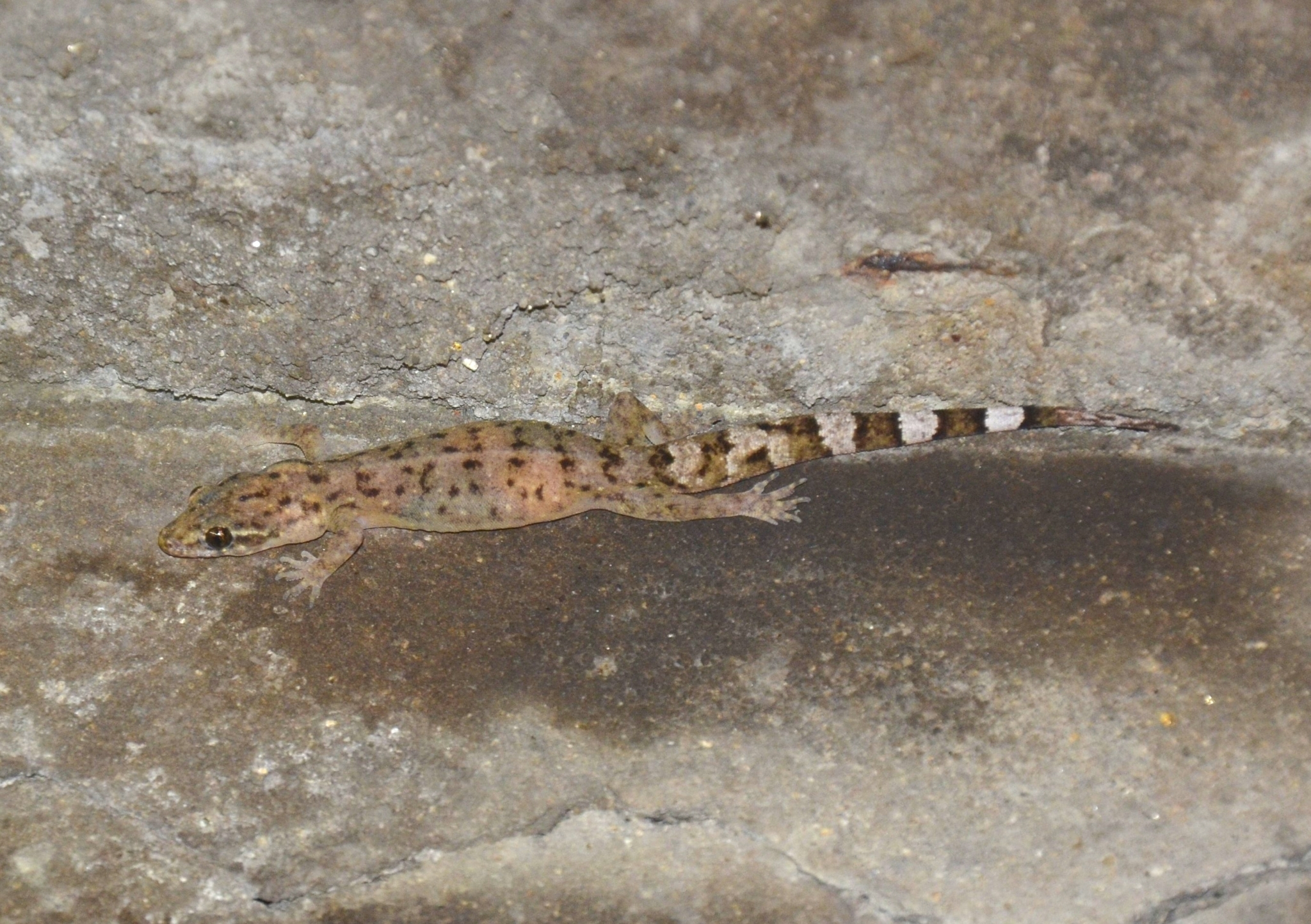

Conservation status
- Near Threatened (IUCN 3.1)

Scientific classification
- Kingdom: Animalia
- Phylum: Chordata
- Class: Reptilia
- Order: Squamata
- Suborder: Gekkota
- Family: Gekkonidae
- Genus: Dravidogecko
- Species: D. anamallensis

Binomial name
- Dravidogecko anamallensis (Günther, 1875)

Synonyms
- Gecko anamallensis; Dravidogecko anamallensis; Hemidactylus anamallensis

= Dravidogecko anamallensis =

Species of lizard

Dravidogecko anamallensis, also known as the Anamalay gecko, Anaimalai dravidogecko, or Anamalai Hill gecko, is a species of gecko found in the South Indian hills of Palni, Anamalai and Tirunelveli. It is assigned to the genus Dravidogecko, with a resurrection in 2019, as a study suggested molecular phylogenetics is to have had a separate origin from the other Hemidactylus species.
