= Dewan Bahadur =

Title of honour awarded during British rule in India

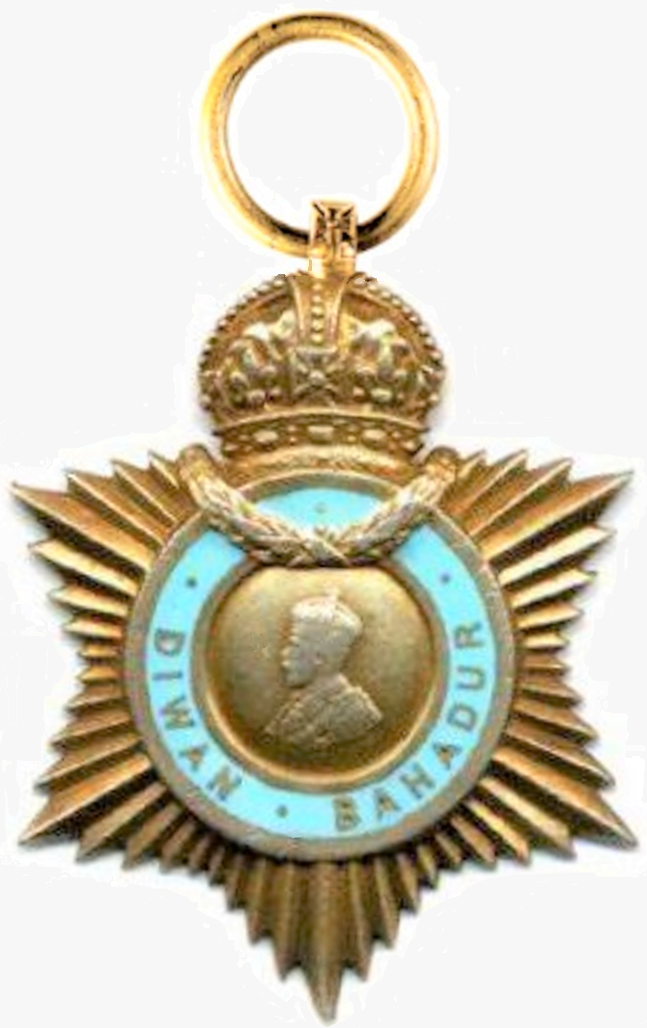
Diwan Bahadur Title Badge awarded during the reign of King George V.

Dewan Bahadur or Diwan Bahadur was a title of honour awarded during British rule in India. It was awarded to individuals who had performed faithful service or acts of public welfare to the nation. From 1911, the title was accompanied by a special Title Badge. Dewan literally means 'Prime Minister' in the Indian context and Bahadur means brave.

This title was above the Rao Bahadur title, and people with the Rao Bahadur title could be elevated to the status of Diwan Bahadur.

Further, the Prime Ministers of the Indian Princely States were known as Dewan/Diwan. They were also given or promoted directly to the title of Dewan Bahadur by the British authorities on being appointed Dewan, to suit their post.

The Dewan and other similar titles issued during the British Raj were disestablished in August 1947 upon the independence of India.

== List of people with Dewan Bahadur title ==
- V.Masilamani Pillai
- Patri Srinivasa Rao
- R. Raghunatha Rao – Dewan of Indore State from 1875 to 1880 and 1886 to 1888.
- Rettamalai Srinivasan
- R. Ramachandra Rao
- N. Pattabhirama Rao
- K. Rangachari
- V. Nagam Aiya of Travancore
- I. X. Pereira
- K. P. Puttanna Chetty
- D. D. Thacker of Jharia
- Ketoli Chengappa Chief Commissioner of Kodagu
- C. S. Ratnasabhapathy Mudaliar CBE Indian industrialist and politician.
- R. Venkata Ratnam of Madras
- E.K Govindan
- E.K Krishnan of Madras
- P. T. Kumarasamy Chetty of Madras
- T. Namberumal Chetty of Madras
- Rettamalai Srinivasan of Madras
- S. Venkataramadas Nayudu – Dewan of the Pudukkottai state from 1899 to 1909.
- V. Thirumalai Pillai of Madras
- P. Khalifullah Sahib Rowther – Dewan of Pudukkottai State from 1941 to 1947.
- Lodd Govindoss Chathurbhujadoss
- Chevalier I. X. Pereira (Ignatius Xavier Pereira) KCSS colonial-era Sri Lankan businessman and politician.
- L. D. Swamikannu Pillai - First elected president of the Madras Legislative Council.

== See also ==
- Rai Bahadur
- Rai Sahib
- Raj Ratna
- Khan Bahadur
- Khan Sahib
- Divan
- Dewan
- Title Badge (India)
