= Vai. Mu. Kothainayaki Ammal =

Tamil writer

Vaithamanithi Mudumbai Kothainayaki Ammal
- Born: 1 December 1901; Neervalur, Chingleput District, Madras Presidency, British India (now in Kanchipuram district, Tamil Nadu, India)
- Died: 20 February 1960 (aged 58); Madras, Madras State (now Chennai, Tamil Nadu), India
- Citizenship: Indian
- Occupations: novelist, writer, publisher, singer, composer, social activist
- Spouse: Parthasarathy (m. 1907)
- Writing career
- Genres: detective fiction, society and culture

Vaithamanithi Mudumbai Kothainayaki Ammal (1 December 1901 – 20 February 1960), commonly known as Vai Mu Ko, was an Indian writer, novelist, and journalist who was the first woman to occupy the editorial board of a Tamil-language magazine. She wrote 115 books and published the monthly Tamil magazine Jaganmohini.

Kothainayaki was the first female writer in Tamil to write a detective novel. She was interested in a variety of topics and excelled in fields like public speaking, social service, music composition, and fiction writing. Kothainayaki was also a feminist and a freedom fighter. She was hailed as the "Queen of Fictions" by contemporary authors. However, Kothainayaki was not well recognized in books about the history of Tamil literature.

== Life ==
Kothainayaki was born on 1 December 1901 to a devout Vaishnavite couple -- Pattammal and N. S. Venkatachary-- in Neervalur (a village near Kanchipuram in present-day Tamil Nadu). She was named Kothai after the poet-saint Andal. Her mother died when she was one year old and thereafter she was raised by various relatives.

Child marriage being then customary, 5^{1/2} year-old Kothainayaki was married to a nine-year-old named Parthasarathy in 1907. Her husband's family used the prefix of Vai Mu with their name, and Kothainayaki assumed this practice. The prefix Vai referred to the family deity of Vaithamaanidhi, while Mu referred to Mudumbai, their ancestral village.

Kothainayaki had no formal schooling and she could not read or write at the time of her marriage. Parthasarathy was insistent that Kothainayaki should be educated. She learnt the Telugu language from her mother-in-law.

=== Her literary service ===
Even though Kothainayaki could not read or write, she often used to sing verses from Thiruvaimozhi at home. This helped her to become proficient in the Tamil language. Kothainayaki was fond of telling stories to small children. Parthasarathy admired her story telling skills and took her to see dramas and plays; these became the seed for her future career as a playwright.

She was a supporter of women's emancipation and societal reforms and this kindled her desire to become a writer. Since she could not write, she dictated her stories to her friend, Pattammal. Kothainayaki's first play, Indira Mohana, was published by Noble Press in 1924. She received rave reviews for her play in The Hindu, Swadesamitran (Tamil), and New India. The success of her first play spurred Kothainayaki to continue her literary journey. She learned to read and write, thanks to her friend Pattammal. Kothainayaki tried her hand at directing plays and succeeded in her venture. Many of her plays had social reform themes and were staged a number of times. Amongst them, Arunodayam, Vatsa Kumar, and Dayanidhi caught the attention of the public. Kothainayaki also published several short stories, three plays, and also other two books.

=== As a magazine editor ===
After the success of Indira Mohana, Kothainayaki wrote her first novel Vaidehi which was serialised in the magazine Jaganmohini. On the advice of author Vaduvar Doraiswami Iyengar, Kothainayaki had taken over as editor of Jaganmohini, in 1925. As this magazine became popular among its readers, Kothainayaki introduced several changes and published the latest works of celebrated writers. Soon Jaganmohini became one of the best selling magazines of that era. Kothainayaki wrote about her views on social issues like Hindu-Muslim unity, women's emancipation, patriotism, prohibition, and widow remarriage in her novels serialised in the magazine. Kothainayaki wrote 115 novels during her literary career and in 1937 she established a printing press.

=== As a public speaker ===
Kothainayaki's skill at public speaking came to be well known through her participation in political meetings. She interspersed her speeches with short stories to entertain the audience. Kothainayaki was a front line speaker for the Indian National Congress (INC). Leaders like C. Rajagopalachari, S. Satyamurti, and K. Kamaraj regularly asked her to participate in public meetings.

=== As a classical music singer ===
Kothainayaki was a talented singer of classical Carnatic music. Her mellifluous voice, diction, and knowledge of music and its nuances contributed to her success as a singer. When she sang patriotic songs at INC meetings, she pulled large crowds. Kothainayaki paved the way for celebrated singer D. K. Pattammal to give public performances. Mahakavi Bharathiar was also a fan of Kothainayaki's singing. Kothainayaki regularly sang for All India Radio and released several gramophone records.

Kothainayaki also a composed classical music. The book titled Isai Margam contains some of her compositions. Subramania Bharati composed his song "Aduvome, Pallu Paduvome" for Kothainayaki and, later, D. K. Pattammal became a star by singing it.

=== As a freedom fighter ===
Through Anne Besant, Kothainayaki befriended social worker Ambujammmal. She met Mahatma Gandhi and Kasturbai in 1925. This meeting greatly impacted her. Impressed by the simplicity of Gandhi's life, and his powerful oration, Kothainayaki renounced interest in luxurious living and started wearing only khadi saris, discarding her silk dresses and gold and diamond jewellery. She plunged into social service activities with Ambujam Ammal, Rukmany Lakshmipathy and Vasumathi Ramaswamy. Responding to the Mahatma's call in 1931, she participated in the satyagraha agitation against toddy and liquor shops and was arrested by the police. Kothainayaki received a six month prison sentence which was increased to eight months when she refused to pay the fine that was imposed on her by the court. In 1932, she was jailed for participation in the agitation against the Lodhi Commission and the stir for the boycott of foreign clothes.

While serving her sentences in prison, Kothainayaki continued to write novels. These novels contained the true life stories of other prisoners. Her husband managed the magazine Jaganmohini during her imprisonment.

=== In the service of world of cinema ===
Kothainayaki was a member of Film Censor Board for ten years. She used to go to cinema halls, incognito, to check whether the scenes censored by the board had been reintroduced and were being screened. After finding such a film, she directed that it be sent to the board for fresh certification.

Her novels were made into films. The more notable among the films were Anadhai Penn (1938, Jupiter Pictures) and Dayanidhi which was retitled as Chitthi (1966), Rajmohan and Nalinasekaran. Posthumously, she won the Award as the Best (Cinema) Story Writer, for Chiththi, Rajmohan and Nalinasekaran.

=== In public and social service ===
Kothainayaki was good in midwifery. She would help women irrespective of caste or creed and free of cost. After Gandhi's assassination in 1948, she commemorated his memory by started an association called Mahatmaji Seva Sangam to help poor and orphaned children. When the government gave her ten acres of land in recognition of her public service spirit and patriotism, she gave the ten acres to Sri Vinoba Bhave for his Bhoodan Movement.

=== Her last days ===
When her only son, Srinivasan, suddenly died in 1956, Kothainayaki was greatly upset and could not come to terms with it. She lost interest in life and did not care for her health properly. She was diagnosed with lung tuberculosis. Kothainayaki died on 20 February 1960 at the Government Hospital of Thoracic Medicine, Madras (now Chennai).
