= Raghupathi Venkataratnam Naidu =

Indian social reformer and educationist (1862–1939)

Dewan Bahadur Sir Raghupathi Venkataratnam Naidu
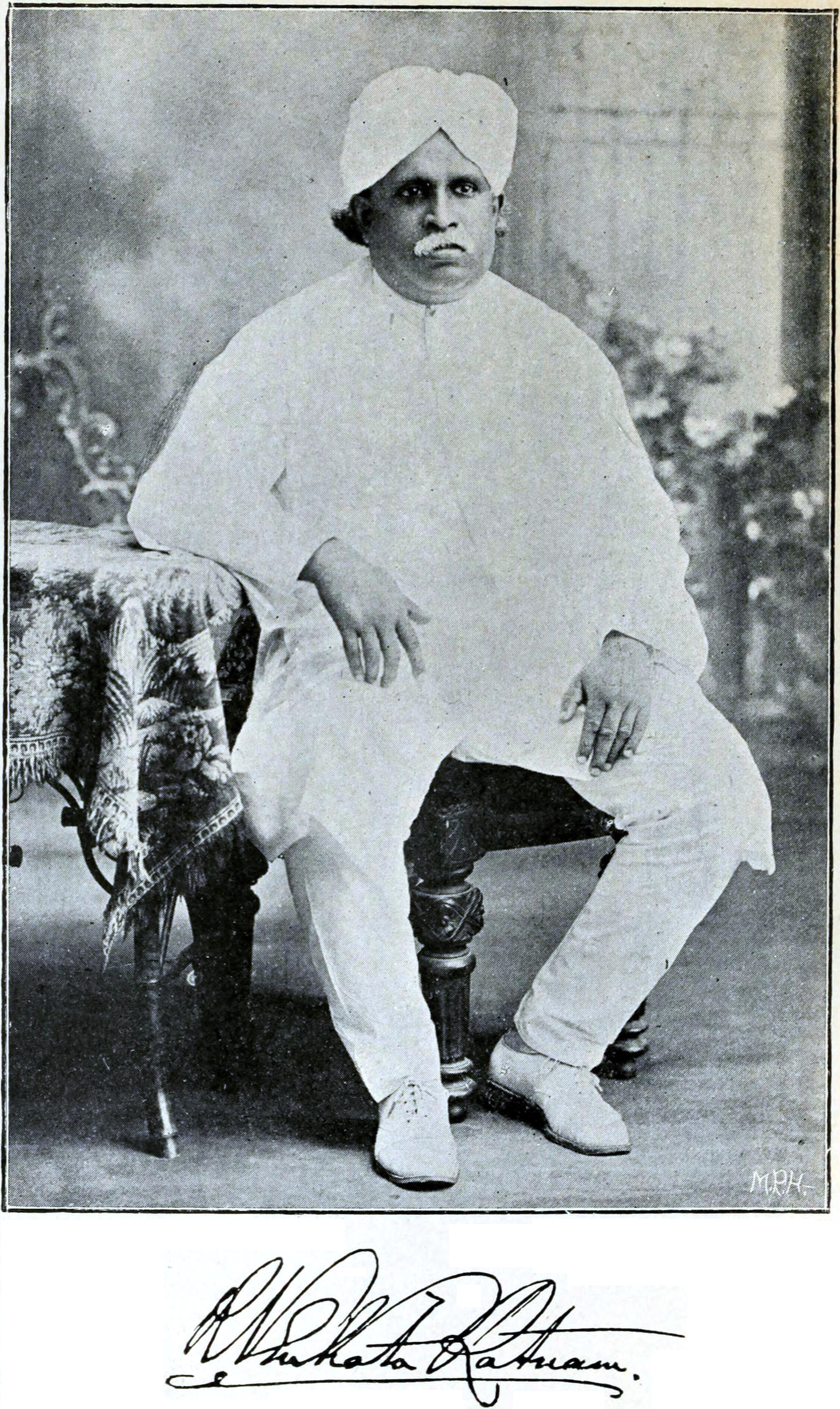
- Born: Raghupathi Venkataratnam Naidu; 1 October 1862; Machilipatnam, Madras Presidency, British India (now in Andhra Pradesh, India)
- Died: 26 May 1939 (aged 76)
- Occupations: Social reformer, educationist, writer
- Relatives: Raghupathi Venkaiah Naidu (brother); Raghupathi Surya Prakash (nephew)

Dewan Bahadur Sir Raghupathi Venkataratnam Naidu (1 October 1862 – 26 May 1939) was an Indian social reformer and educationist who hailed from present-day Andhra Pradesh. He was described as "the most powerful orator of his day". He worked for the eradication of untouchability and upliftment of Dalits. He strived for the reformation of the Devadasi system in Andhra, and succeeded to a considerable extent. He promoted widow remarriages and encouraged women's education.

Venkataratnam Naidu worked as the Principal of the Mehboob College, Secunderabad, and later the PR Government College, Kakinada. In 1925, he became the first elected Vice Chancellor of Madras University and in that capacity was responsible for creating several new departments of research and teaching.

Naidu also served on several municipal councils, the District Board of Godavari and the Taluka Board. He became a Member and the Deputy President of the Madras Legislative Council. Government recognised his contribution to public work by awarding the Kaiser-i-Hind Gold Medal and conferring a knighthood on him in the 1924 Birthday Honours. The Andhra and the Madras Universities conferred on him the honorary degrees of D.Litt. and LL.D. The Brahmo Samaj honoured him with the title of "Brahmarshi".

== Early life ==
Raghupathi Venkataratnam Naidu was born on 1 October 1862 in Machilipatnam in a famous Telaga Kapu family. Raghupati Venkaiah Naidu, a film pioneer regarded as the "father of Telugu cinema" was the younger brother of Venkataratnam.

Venkataratnam Naidu's ancestors served as Subedars in Madras Army and East Indian Company Army since its inception i.e. late 17th century. As his father, Raghupathi Appayya Naidu worked as a Subedar in the army, he lived in Chandrapur. This helped him gain knowledge of Urdu, Arabic, and Persian languages.

Venkataratnam Naidu continued his education in Nizam High school in Hyderabad when his father was transferred there. After passing Matriculation in Hyderabad, Venkataratnam Naidu completed his B.A. degree from Madras Christian College in 1885. He completed his M. A. degree in 1891 in English Literature from the Madras University by submitting a thesis on John Milton's Paradise Regained. He took his L.T. degree in 1897.

== Career ==
=== Educationist ===
After completing his M.A. and L.T. degrees from Madras University, Venkataratnam Naidu joined the teaching line. He worked as the principal of the Mehboob College, Secunderabad between 1899 and 1904, and then of the Pitapuram Raja College, Kakinada between 1905 and 1919. He was a member of Madras Legislative Council 1921 and nominated to the panel of Chairmen by P. Rajagopala Achariyar. In 1925 he became the first elected vice chancellor of Madras University, holding that position until 1928. He was conferred a knighthood by the British government in 1924.

=== Social reformer ===
Venkataratnam Naidu was a disciple of Kandukuri Veeresalingam. Naidu founded the Social Purity Association in 1891 to train people as honest citizens. He worked for the eradication of untouchability and upliftment of Harijans, and founded an orphanage and a hostel for Harijan boys and girls in Kakinada. He strived for the abolition of the Devadasi system in Andhra, and succeeded to a considerable extent. He promoted widow remarriages and encouraged women's education. He promoted the Brahmo movement in Andhra. The Brahmo Samaj honored him with the title of "Brahmarshi". All the above social reforms have led to him being described as the second great social reformer of Andhra, the first being Veeresalingam. Writer Chalam was his disciple.

=== Author ===
Venkataratnam Naidu's thoughts and writings were published in 1924 authored by him and V. Ramkrishna Rao - The Message and Ministrations of Dewan Bahadur Sir R. Venkata Ratnam, Volume 3 by Sir R Venkata Ratnam, V. Ramakrishna Rao.
