= Raghupathi Surya Prakash =

Indian film pioneer (1901–1956)

R. S. Prakash
- Born: Raghupathi Surya Prakash Rao Naidu; 1901; Madras, Madras Presidency, British India (now Chennai, India)
- Died: 28 May 1956 (aged 55); Madras, India (now Chennai)
- Occupations: Film director; Film producer; Cinematographer
- Father: Raghupathi Venkaiah Naidu
- Relatives: Raghupathi Venkataratnam Naidu (uncle)

Raghupathi Surya Prakash Rao Naidu (1901–1956), popularly known as R. S. Prakash, was an Indian film director, producer, and cinematographer. He was one of the pioneers of Indian cinema. He was the first director of Telugu cinema. He shot, developed and edited all his early films.

Along with his father, Raghupathi Venkaiah Naidu, he produced Bhishma Pratigya in 1921 — generally considered to be the first Telugu feature film. Prakash directed the film and also played the title role of Bhishma. Later, he directed several silent and sound films till the 1950s.

== Early life ==
Raghupathi Surya Prakash Rao Naidu was born in 1901 in Madras in a Telugu-speaking telaga family. His father was Raghupathi Venkaiah Naidu, a film pioneer regarded as the "father of Telugu cinema".

Surya Prakash's ancestors are telaga balija naidu's who served as Subedars in Madras Army and East Indian Company Army since its inception i.e. late 17th century.

Venkaiah Naidu started film exhibition in South India around 1910 and built the first movie theatre in Madras in 1914. Surya Prakash was educated by Christian missionaries in Vepery.

== Career ==
Venkaiah sent Surya Prakash overseas to learn filmmaking. Prakash went to London and joined Barker Motion Photography in Ealing in 1918, then went to Paris (Pathé), Germany (where he saw F. W. Murnau at work) and to Hollywood. He travelled to various European countries, bringing a 35mm camera home to Madras in 1920. The faulty camera ruined his first feature film, Meenakshi Kalyanam.

In 1921, Venkaiah and Surya Prakash set up the Star of the East Studio, also known as the Glass Studio, in Purasawalkam, Madras. They produced Bhishma Pratigya (1921), generally considered to be the first Telugu feature film. Prakash directed the film and also played the title role of Bhishma. An Englishwoman named Peggy Castello played the role of Ganga. The film was released all over India, Burma and Sri Lanka and was a big success. The film was made on a budget of ₹12,000 (worth ₹2.2 crore in 2021 prices) and made ₹60,000 in returns.

C. Pullayya, A. Narayanan (also credited as A. Narayan) and other pioneers of South Indian cinema worked with him there. The films were distributed throughout the subcontinent with intertitles in various languages. Surya Prakash reportedly directed the Catholic propaganda film, The Catechist of Kil-Arni (1923), produced and written by the Irish priest Thomas Gavan-Duffy together with Bruce Gordon as a fund-raiser for the Paris Foreign Mission Society in Pondicherry.

Surya Prakash also became a distributor and founded Guarantee Pics (1926) with backing from the merchant Moti Narayana Rao, but it went bankrupt. He helped Narayanan to set up the General Pictures Corporation (General Pics) in 1929 and later, Srinivasa Cinetone Studio. He later separated from Narayanan in the mid-30s and joined Sundaram Sound Studio. He also worked with Govardhan Film Distributors, owning three movie theatres in Madras. He directed Leila the Star of Mingrelia (1931) in 20 reels for General Pics, declaring that people were not fed up of silent films. It was reportedly the most expensive film made in India at the time.

Surya Prakash was known as a brilliant technician. In Draupadi Vastrapaharanam (1934) he managed to make one actor appear in five places within one image, apparently without resorting to optical effects. He was a freelance director from mid-30s. Surya Prakash influenced Y. V. Rao who acted in his Gajendra Moksham (1930). Most of his mythological films were shot at the Gingee Fort near Madras. He also directed the Tamil reformist social film, Anaadhai Penn (1938).

There is contradictory evidence about some of Prakash's early Tamil sound films like Draupadi Vastrapaharanam, Krishna Arjuna, Indrasabha and Rajasekharan, which some sources ascribe to Prakash and others to his collaborator Narayanan. Encyclopaedia of Indian Cinema credited them to both filmmakers.

== Filmography ==
- Bhishma Pratigna (1921)
- The Catechist of Kil-Arni (1923) (uncredited)
- Gajendra Moksham (1923)
- Bhakta Nandan (1923)
- Samudra Madanam (1923)
- Usha Swapna (1924)
- Mahatma Kabirdas (1925)
- Mohini Avatar (1926)
- Dashavtar (1929)
- Stage Girl (1929)
- Gajendra Moksham (1930)
- Sree Kanyaka Parmeswari (1930)
- Lanka Dabana (1930)
- Gandhariyin Pulambal (1930)
- Pavalakkodi (1931)
- Leila the Star of Mingrelia (1931)
- Rose of Rajasthan (1931)
- Vishnu Leela (1932)
- Draupadi Vastrapaharanam (1934)
- Lanka Dahanam (1935)
- Thooku Thooki (1935)
- Krishna Arjuna (1935)
- Krishna Naradi (1936)
- Nalayini (1936)
- Indrasabba (1936)
- Andal Thirukalyanam (1937)
- Soldier's Wife (1937)
- Rajasekharan (1937)
- Anaadhai Penn (1938)
- Porveeran Manaivi (1938)
- Sirikathe (1939)
- Chandika (1940)
- Tara Sasank (1941)
- Babruvahana (1942)
- Mayapilla (1951)
- Moondru Penngal (1956)
