= Raghupathi Venkaiah Naidu =

Indian film pioneer (1869–1941)

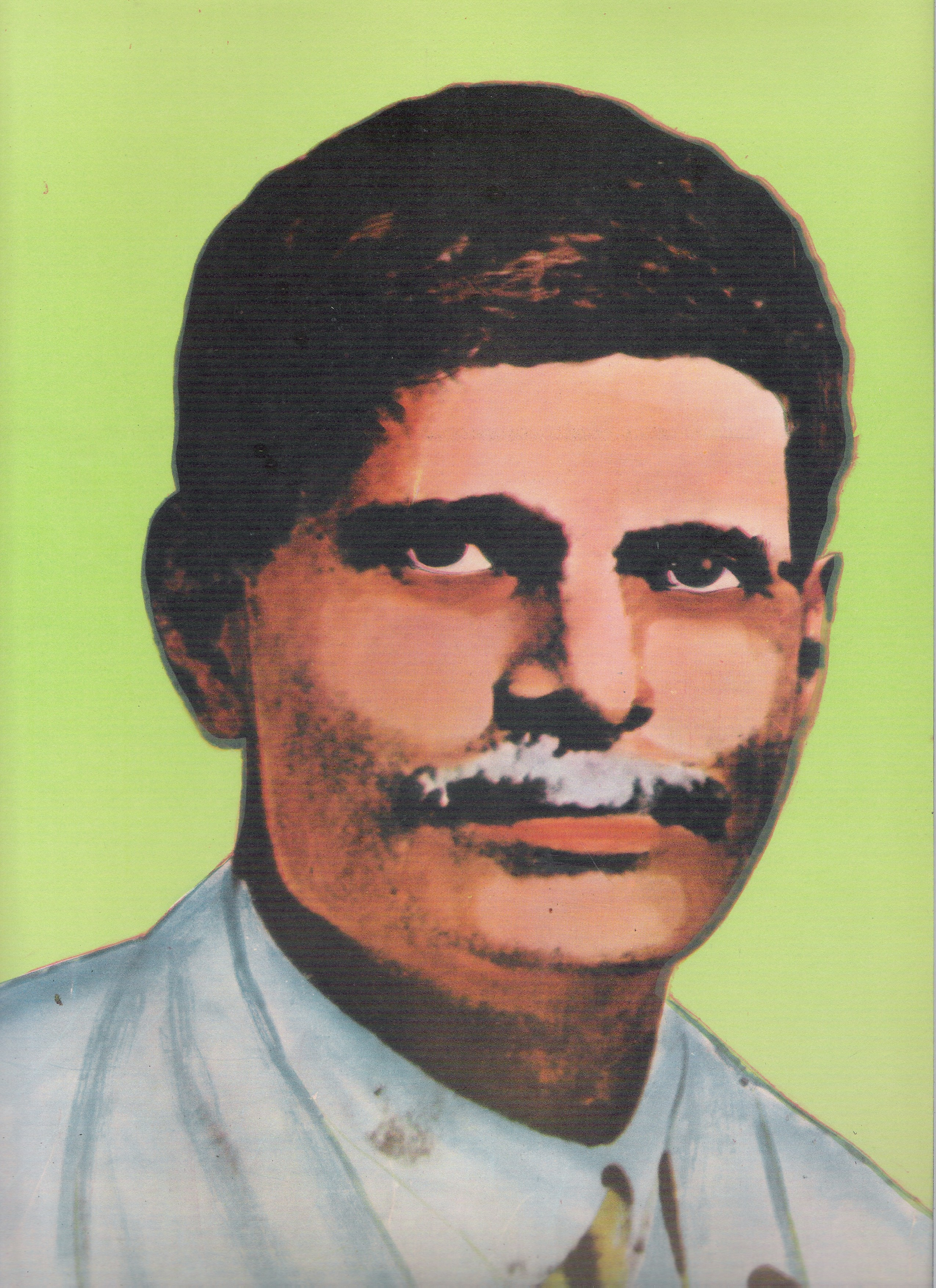
- Born: 15 October 1869; Machilipatnam, Madras Presidency, British India (now in Andhra Pradesh, India)
- Died: 15 March 1941 (aged 71)
- Occupations: Filmmaker; photographer; entrepreneur
- Children: Raghupathi Surya Prakash
- Relatives: Raghupathi Venkataratnam Naidu (brother)

Raghupathi Venkaiah Naidu (15 October 1869 – 15 March 1941) was an Indian filmmaker and entrepreneur widely regarded as the father of Telugu cinema. A pioneer of Indian cinema, Naidu established the first Indian-owned movie theatres in South India and founded Star of the East Films, the first film production company established by a Telugu person. He is credited with producing Bhishma Pratigna (1921), considered the first Telugu feature film, thus laying the foundation for the Telugu film industry.

Born in Machilipatnam, Andhra Pradesh, Naidu was the second son of an Indian Army official and the younger brother of the noted social reformer Raghupathi Venkataratnam Naidu. He moved to Madras (now Chennai) at the age of 18, where he began his career as a commercial photographer. Venturing into filmmaking, he established "The Glass Studio," a cinematograph company named for its glass roof, which allowed sunlight to penetrate in the days before electric lighting. Naidu's entrepreneurial spirit led him to set up the first permanent cinema theatres in Madras, including The Gaiety in 1912, followed by Crown Theatre and Globe Theatre, where he screened American, European, and Indian silent films.

Despite facing intense competition from European firms, Naidu persisted, producing and exhibiting short films across South India and Burma. His efforts in promoting cinematic techniques and distributing foreign silent films were instrumental in the growth of the South Indian film industry. He and his London-educated son, Raghupathi Surya Prakash Naidu, produced several films over the years, including Bhishma Pratigna, Gajendra Moksham, Mathsyavatharam and Nandanaar. The Raghupathi Venkaiah Award, part of the Nandi Awards, is named in his honour, recognizing lifetime achievements in Telugu cinema.

== Early life ==
Raghupathi Venkaiah Naidu was born on 15 October into a Telugu family of Naidus in Machilipatnam. He was the second son of Subedar Raghupathi Appayya Naidu, an Indian Army official, and Seshamma. His elder brother, Raghupathi Venkataratnam Naidu, was a prominent educationalist and social reformer. Venkaiah Naidu's family had a long history of military service, with his ancestors serving as commanders in the East India Company and Madras Army's Hyderabad Regiments.

== Career ==
=== Early career ===
From a young age, Venkaiah Naidu developed a passion for painting and sculpture. Noticing Naidus’s keen interest in art, his father sent him to Madras at the age of 18. In Madras, Naidu rented a small house on Mount Road and established an art centre where he honed his skills in painting and sculpture. He created numerous oil paintings and sculptures, which attracted the attention of local royalty and zamindars. These patrons purchased his artworks, providing him with financial support. In addition to his passion for painting and sculpture, Naidu also developed an interest in photography. He established a photographic studio and began experimenting with various techniques. Around the same time, silent films were gaining popularity, and Naidu started studying the filmmaking process, marking the beginning of his exploration into cinema.

=== Film exhibition ===
During this time, Naidu came across an advertisement for a new device called the Chrono Megaphone, which projected sound waves during silent film screenings, enhancing the viewer's experience. Although expensive, Naidu acquired the device and imported it from London, along with a 4,000-foot silent film. In 1910, he conducted the first experiment with the Chrono Megaphone at the Victoria Public Hall in Madras, where the audience was thrilled by the added sound during the silent film. His experiment's success led to wider screenings across towns and villages in the Madras Presidency, as well as in places like Bangalore, Vijayawada, Sri Lanka, Rangoon and Pegu in Burma.

In 1910, he established Esplanade Tent House to exhibit his films. In 1912, he constructed Gaiety Theatre on Mount Road, the first Indian-owned cinema theatre in Madras. He later constructed Crown Theatre on Mint Street and Globe Theatre in Purasawakkam, Madras. He also exhibited American and British films. Some of the first films shown in his theatres were The Million Dollar Mystery (1914), The Broken Coin (1915), Mysteries of Meera, Clutching Hand, Raja's Casket, Pearl Fish, and Great Bard. He established a film library and provided training on cinematic techniques.

=== Film production ===
Realizing the potential in filmmaking, Venkaiah Naidu sent his son, Ragupathi Surya Prakash Naidu, to London to study film production techniques. Surya Prakash trained under renowned directors and worked as an assistant to Cecil B. DeMille. Upon returning to India, he brought a camera with him and started Star of the East Films in 1919. Their first production was Meenakshi Kalyanam, filmed near the Meenakshi Temple in Madurai. However, technical issues with the camera ruined the footage, forcing them to abandon the project. They later imported another camera and successfully produced Bhishma Pratigna (1921), the first Telugu silent film, while his son directed. Following this, they produced four more films: Gajendra Moksham, Bhakta Nandanar, Samudra Mathanam, and Matsyavataram. Due to the unavailability of Telugu actresses, Anglo-Indian women were cast in female roles.

Venkaiah also built a studio, known as the Glass Studio, where sunlight was used for filming due to the lack of electricity. By 1927, Venkaiah Naidu was producing films in large numbers, but the financial returns did not meet their expectations, leading to severe financial difficulties. He faced high competition with East India Film Company. Eventually, he was forced to sell his studio in 1929. While Venkaiah Naidu returned to his photography business, his son, Surya Prakash, continued in the film industry, although without much financial success.

Venkaiah Naidu died on 15 March 1941 due to medical illness.

== Legacy ==
=== Ragupathi Venkaiah Naidu Award ===
In 1981, the Andhra Pradesh government instituted the prestigious Raghupathi Venkaiah Naidu Award, honouring individuals for their lifetime contributions to Telugu cinema. The award includes a gold Nandi and a cash prize of ₹50,000. It is presented annually during the Nandi Awards ceremony. The first recipient of this honour was L. V. Prasad, followed by luminaries such as P. Pullayya, Bhanumathi, Nagi Reddy, and Akkineni Nageswara Rao. In 2016, the award was presented to Chiranjeevi.

In a controversial move, the government removed the word "Naidu" from the award's name, renaming it as simply the "Ragupathi Venkaiah Award".

=== Biographical film ===
In 2012, a biographical film on Ragupathi Venkaiah Naidu was produced by Satish Babu, directed by Babji, and starred actors such as Naresh, Tanikella Bharani, and Maharshi Raghava. Despite being completed, the film has not yet been released, which has been viewed as a disservice to Venkaiah’s legacy.

== Personal life ==
Devika, a popular actress in Telugu and Tamil films in the 1960s, was the grand-daughter of Venkaiah Naidu. Devika's daughter, Kanaka is also an actress.

== Filmography ==
- Meenakshi Kalyanam
- Gajendra Moksham
- Mathsyavatharam
- Nandanaar
- Bhishma Pratigya (1921)

== In popular culture ==
A biographical film on Naidu titled Raghupathi Venkaiah Naidu was released in November 2019. Naresh played the title role of Venkaiah Naidu.

== See also ==
- Dadasaheb Phalke
- H. M. Reddy
