= Kapu (caste) =

Hindu caste of South India

- Classification: Forward caste
- Religions: Hinduism
- Languages: Telugu
- Country: India
- Populated states: Major: Andhra Pradesh; Yanam; Minor: Telangana; Orissa
- Region: South India
- Subdivisions: Telaga, Ontari

Kapu is a Hindu caste primarily found in the Indian state of Andhra Pradesh. The Kapus are classified as a Forward caste, and are a community of land-owning agriculturists. Historically, they also served as military generals (Nayakas) and warriors in Hindu kingdoms such as the Vijayanagara Empire. The Kapus are a dominant caste of Andhra Pradesh. They are primarily present in Coastal Andhra, with a major concentration in the Godavari-Krishna delta region. The Kapus commonly use the title Naidu.

The Kapu caste includes the sub-castes Telaga and Ontari, both historically recognized as warrior communities known for their honour and bravery. The terms Kapu and Telaga are often used interchangeably. The origins of the Telagas are linked to the Velanadu chiefs (1076–1216 CE), who ruled Coastal Andhra and gradually became known as Telagas. In most of Coastal Andhra, Kapu, Telaga, and Ontari are all referred to as Kapu, except in the former Srikakulam and Vizianagaram districts, where they are specifically known as Telagas. The Kapu caste is closely related to the Balija community of Rayalaseema, and the two groups are often categorized together in governmental and sociological contexts.

Kapus of Coastal Andhra are distinct from other similarly named communities like the Munnuru Kapus of Telangana, the Turpu Kapus of Uttarandhra, and the Reddys of Rayalaseema and Telangana.

== Etymology ==
Kāpu literally means cultivator or protector in Telugu. More specifically, Kāpu refers to landowning cultivators in the context of the Jajmani system. In several places, the landowning cultivators are addressed by the agricultural labourers as Kāpu.

== History ==
=== Origins ===
Various subgroups of Kapus (cultivators) branched off into separate communities in the post-Kakatiya period (Velamas, Panta Kapus and Pakanati Kapus—both of whom got labelled Reddys, and Kapus of Kammanadu—eventually labelled Kammas). The remaining Kapus continue to use the original label. B. S. L. Hanumantha Rao while explaining the term Kapu noted, "people who are into cultivation, or farming, but who do not belong to Kammas, Reddys and Velamas are known as Kapus." All the cultivator caste clusters have a common ancestry in the legends. According to Cynthia Talbot, the transformation of occupational identities as caste labels occurred in the late Vijayanagara period or later.

=== Medieval era ===
An inscription dating to 1205 CE (1127 Saka year) mentions Teliki Kapulu, which K. Iswara Dutt interprets as referring to Telagas.

The earliest occupation of Kapu community was farming along with military service. In the medieval period, Kapus served as protectors of villages from bandits and as village headmen. They were recruited into army during periods of war and served as governors (nayaks), commanders and soldiers in various Andhra kingdoms. They returned to agriculture during times of peace. Kapus were one of the five major land-owning castes during the Qutub Shahi (1518–1687) rule. Hanumantha Rao notes that Kapus have embraced military as well as farming till the fall of the Vijayanagara Empire.

Kapu sub-castes like Telagas and Ontaris were recorded as warrior communities in the medieval era. Ontaris were elite warriors who engaged in hand-to-hand combat and wielded heavy weapons like maces. They were great wrestlers and received rent-free lands for their military service. Inscriptions from the 15th century register gifts of lands to temples by Ontarlu.

During the medieval era, many Nayakas were Telagas along with Velamas and Balijas. There existed Nayak (Telaga) regiments in the Vijayanagara Empire and they later joined the British army after the fall of Vijayanagara. Telagas in British army held ranks such as Major, Naik, Subedar, Jemadar, Havildar etc. Telagas of Bobbili served as commanders and generals in armies. They formed a major part of the Bobbili army along with Velamas in the famous Battle of Bobbili in 1757.

In the late medieval era, Telagas led the right-hand caste faction, which included Komatis and various other castes, in Machilipatnam and other places of Andhra. At the end of the eighteenth century, Telagas, along with Niyogi Brahmins, were the leaders of the Maha-nadu, a multi-caste assembly to enforce norms in the society.

=== Colonial era ===
During the colonial regime, Kapu-Telaga along with other warrior castes dominated military occupations. When the British reduced military recruitment from agrarian castes and opted for lower castes in order to have more control over the army, The Kapus concentrated on agriculture. The Kapus held the village headman and munasabu (munsif) position in many villages. In the Godavari districts, some Kapus also held the Karanam (village accountant) post, usually the preserve of Niyogi Brahmins.

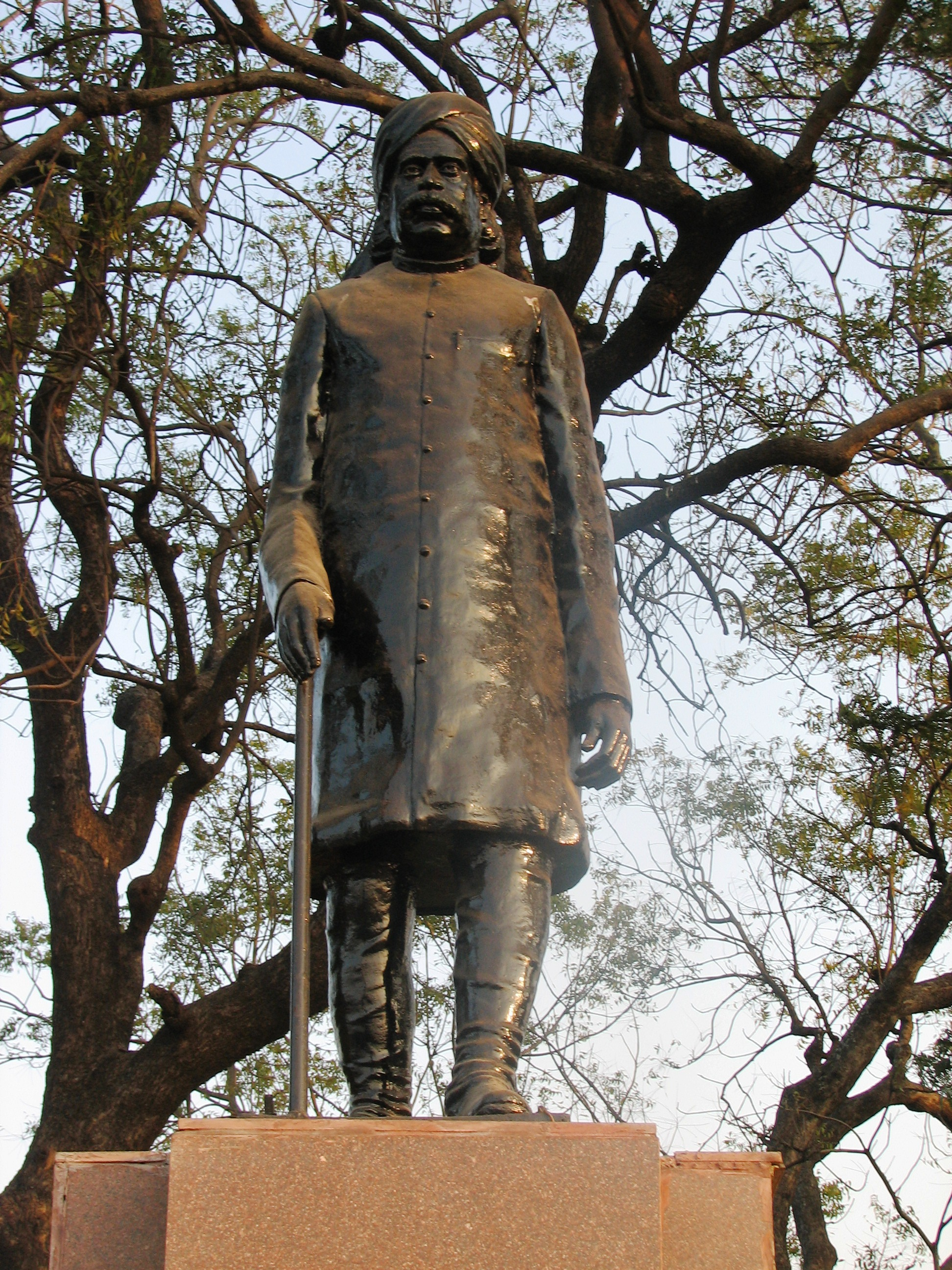
Raghupathi Venkataratnam Naidu is among the 34 historical icons of Telugu culture commemorated with a bronze statue on Tank Bund

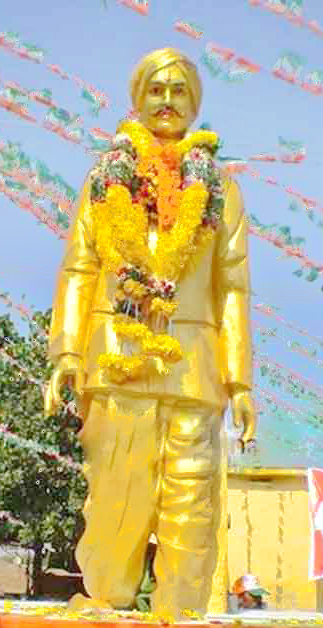
Kanneganti Hanumanthu

The latter half of the 19th century saw the emergence of important social reformers, educationists and literary figures, who left an impact on the social consciousness of the people of Andhra. Prominent Kapus like Raghupati Venkataratnam Naidu and Kurma Venkatareddi Naidu were at the forefront of the social reform movement. Raghupathi Venkataratnam Naidu (1862–1939) worked for the eradication of untouchability, promoted widow remarriages, encouraged women's education, and strived for a reformation of the Devadasi system. Kurma Venkatareddi Naidu (1875–1942), a prominent leader of the Justice Party, formulated policies that promoted social equality, abolition of untouchability, social reform and established the first women's college in Andhra region in Eluru.

Kanneganti Hanumanthu (1870–1922), a Kapu from Palnadu region, rebelled against the British rule and spearheaded the Palnadu Rebellion. When the British imposed 'Pullari' tax on farmers for using the forest produce, Hanumanthu mobilised people to not pay the tax and organised a social boycott of Revenue and Forest department officials. British executed Hanumanthu by a firing squad in 1922. Many Kapus participated in the Swadesi movement, civil disobedience movement and the Quit India movement.

Since Kapu was a generic term for people involved in kapudanam (farming), the British India censuses from 1871 till 1921 clubbed Kapus together with Reddys for enumeration purposes. But, Reddys are distinct from the Kapu community of Coastal Andhra.

=== Present-day ===
Apart from zamindars and large landlords, many Kapus are small-and-medium landholding farmers. Historically, Kapus owned most of the land in the Godavari districts. They also own most of the coconut fields and affiliated agri-businesses in Konaseema region.

Some Kapus also diversified their surplus economy into several entrepreneurial domains like movie theatres and hotels in cities like Visakhapatnam, Kakinada, Rajahmundry. There are also multigenerational Kapu military families in places like Madhavaram in West Godavari. As of 2011, the percentage of graduates among Kapus is one of the highest among Telugu castes.

Film industry

Kapus have historically played a prominent role in Telugu cinema. Raghupathi Venkaiah Naidu, a Kapu from Machilipatnam, was the first Telugu film producer and exhibitor and is regarded as the "father of Telugu cinema". Kapus figure as A-list actors, directors, producers, screenwriters, music composers and technicians in the Telugu film industry. Well-known Telugu cinema icons like S. V. Ranga Rao, Savitri, Chiranjeevi, Pawan Kalyan, Allu Arjun, Ram Charan, Dasari Narayana Rao hail from the Kapu community.

== Geographical distribution ==
=== Native ===
Kapus are primarily present in the Coastal Andhra region with major concentration in the erstwhile districts of East Godavari, West Godavari, Krishna, Guntur, and Visakhapatnam. They are present in smaller numbers in the former districts of Srikakulam and Vizianagaram (where they are primarily referred to as Telagas), and in Prakasam. Kapus are also native to Yanam district of Puducherry and are the second largest caste there.

=== Diaspora ===
A significant number of Kapu settlers are present in the Hyderabad Metropolitan Region of Telangana. Small communities of Telaga-Kapu also exist in Orissa and Kharagpur, West Bengal.

In the 19th and early 20th century, Kapu-Telaga were among the Telugu migrants to Burma, Malaysia, Mauritius and Fiji. Telagas were said to form the largest caste among the Telugu people of Mauritius. In recent decades, Kapus have migrated to the Anglophone countries like United States.

== Distinct castes with similar names ==
There also exist other Kapu communities like the Munnuru Kapus in Telangana, and the Turpu Kapus in Uttarandhra who are enumerated separately from Coastal Andhra Kapus.

Due to Kāpu being a generic Telugu term for landowning cultivator, Reddy caste is sometimes referred to as Kapu in parts of Rayalaseema and Telangana. But, Reddys are distinct from the Kapus of Coastal Andhra. Kapu caste is also unrelated to Konda Kapu, Pattapu Kapu, Vanne Kapu, Palli Kapu, Are Kapu, Morasu Kapu, Kapu Savara castes.

Telaga, a sub-caste of Kapu, has no relation to the Mudiraj and Teli castes who are sometimes referred to as Telaga.

== Subcastes ==
Kapu, Telaga, and Ontari are the subcastes of Kapu community. All three frequently inter-marry and are usually classed as a single unit. Most Telagas and Ontaris have also referred to themselves as Kapus for a long time. The terms Kapu and Telaga are often used as synonyms to collectively refer to all three sections.

=== Kapu ===
Manati Kapu (మానాటి కాపు) or Mahanati Kapu (మహనాటి కాపు) is a section of Kapu community along with Telaga and Ontari. They are popularly known as Kapus and are classified as a Forward caste. They are distinct from Turpu Kapus. Traditionally, Manati Kapus did not recognise divorce and their women would not leave their houses. They were agriculturists and were of a good social standing. Manati Kapu and Telaga are together referred to as Pedda Kapu in comparison with Turpu Kapu.

Charles Philip Brown's Telugu-English Dictionary (1852) mentions Mahanati Kapu as equivalent to Telaga caste. Brown also notes that Mahanati Kapus were leaguesmen and members of the Mahanadu community. Mahanadu was a multi-caste assembly which enforced norms in the society. Andhra Vignanamu, Volume 3 (1939) mentions that Manati Kapus were present in large numbers in erstwhile East and West Godavari districts and in smaller numbers in Krishna, Guntur, Visakhapatnam and Ganjam districts of Madras Presidency.

=== Telaga ===
Telaga is a subcaste of Kapu and both terms are often used synonymously. Historians like Etukuru Balaramamurthy and Chintamani Lakshmanna note that Telagas are the descendants of dynasties like Velanadu chiefs (1076–1216 CE) who ruled Coastal Andhra. Telagas are classified as a Forward caste. They are a land-owning agrarian community. Historically, they were a warrior caste before taking up cultivation. During the colonial era, Telagas were noted to be of a high social position.

=== Ontari ===
Ontari (also referred to as Vontari or Vantari) are a section of Kapu caste. Ontaris are classified as a Forward caste. They are a small community and are primarily found in Kakinada and Anakapalli districts and in smaller numbers in erstwhile West Godavari and Guntur districts. 1901 Census of India describers vantarlu as a sub-caste of Telagas and notes that their name literally means 'a strong man'.

In the present day, Ontaris are landholding agriculturists. Historically, Ontaris were exclusively into military service. Ontari literally means 'the lone one' which referred to their bravery in the context of historical warfare. M. L. Kantha Rao calls Ontaris 'a great warrior class'. They were a clan of warriors in medieval Andhra who engaged in hand-to-hand combat and wielded heavy weapons like maces.

Srinatha mentions Ontarlu in his Palnati Veera Charitra and Bhimeswara Puranam, written in early 15th century. Inscriptions from Vellaturu (dated to 1418 CE) and Tangeda in former Guntur district register gifts of lands to temples by Ontarlu. Mallampalli Somasekhara Sarma notes that Ontari was the vernacular equivalent of the Sanskrit word Ekangavira — a hero who fights the combat alone. Major towns and villages of medieval Andhra had gymnasiums for Ontarlu. Analysing literary sources, Sarma notes that Ontaris, also known as Ekkatis, took part in hand-to-hand fight called Ekkati Kayyamu, the combat of singles. He adds:

Ontari forces served as the reserve army, and each fighter in this division was probably a great wrestler and also wielded heavy weapons like maces and the like. The ekkatis of the Reddi period gradually formed into a separate military caste or community, and are now popularly called Vantarlu. These now form one of the three sections of the Telaga community, the other two being the Telaga (proper), and the Kapu.

As per K. S. Singh, "The title Ontari was awarded to them during the time of Sri Krishnadevaraya in the sixteenth century as a reward for their bravery in warfare. Prior to this, they were only known as Telaga." They received rent-free lands for their services as warriors. During the colonial era, Ontaris were recorded as people who valued honour over their lives. They were known to carry daggers on their waists at all times. Ontari women previously observed gosha. Ontaris in Parlakimidi (Orissa), Bobbili, Pitapuram were referred to as Dora (lord or master).

== Relation to Balija ==
Balijas are closely related to Kapus and both are often enumerated together in government, sociological and psephological contexts. Andhra Vignanamu, Volume 3 (1939) mentions four sections in Telaga community — Telagas (or Naidus), Ontaris (or Doras), Balijas, and Kapus. Anthropological Survey of India notes that Balijas of Rayalaseema are ethnically similar to Kapus of Coastal Andhra.

Various sources note the similarities between the communities of Kapu, Telaga, Balija, and Ontari. These terms are often used as synonyms and are mentioned as sections of each other. Kapu, Telaga, and Balija are considered as variant names of the same community in different regions. Andhra Pradesh government's Kapu Welfare and Development Corporation refers to Kapu, Telaga, Balija, and Ontari communities collectively as Kapu.

== Status ==
Kapus are classified as a Forward caste both by the Central Government of India as well as the Andhra Pradesh Government. As of 2023, they do not avail any caste-based quotas or reservations. They are a community of land-owning cultivators and are one of the dominant castes of Andhra Pradesh.

The four-tier varna system of ranking never really took hold in South Indian society. The two intermediate dvija varnas—the Kshatriyas and Vaishyas—did not exist. In South India, on the other hand, there existed only three distinguishable classes—the Brahmins, the non-Brahmins and the Dalits. Kapus are referred to as a non-Brahmin upper-caste. They are considered to be a "Sat Shudra" (also known as "upper/high-caste/clean Shudra") community in the traditional Hindu ritual ranking system.

In a study on the history of Guntur district, Robert Eric Frykenberg categorized Kapus and Telagas among "elite agricultural (warrior) castes". In 1982, Barbara D. Miller of Syracuse University remarked, "Generally the Telaga-Kapu rank fairly high in status". K. C. Suri notes that non-Brahman caste groups like Kapus, whose main occupation has been cultivation, are the most important social groups in Andhra Pradesh in terms of numerical strength, land control, and access to political power. K. Srinisavulu notes that Kapus are fairly prosperous and are dominant in the erstwhile districts of East Godavari and West Godavari.

== Politics ==
During the 1920s and 1930s, Kapus, along with other feudal landed castes, were major supporters of the Justice Party. Prominent Kapu leader Kurma Venkatareddi Naidu was a member of the Justice Party and formulated policies that promoted social equality, abolition of untouchability, and social reform. In 1920, the first legislative council elections to Madras Presidency were held after the passing of the Government of India Act 1919. Naidu was one of the three ministers in the Cabinet holding the portfolios of Development and Industries. In 1936, he was appointed as the Governor of Madras Presidency, one of the only two Indians in history to have held the post. In 1937, he was elected as the Chief Minister of the Madras Presidency. He was the only person to have held both the posts of Chief Minister and Governor of the Madras Presidency (which included all of present-day Andhra Pradesh and Tamil Nadu along with parts of Kerala and Karnataka).

After Indian independence, Andhra State was formed in 1953. Pasala Suryachandra Rao, a Kapu from West Godavari district was the first deputy speaker of Andhra State Assembly from 1953 to 1954. Rokkam Lakshmi Narasimham Dora, a Telaga Kapu from Srikakulam district served as the second speaker of Andhra State Assembly from 1955 to 1956. In the 1955 Andhra State legislature, there were 16 Kapu legislators, the third-highest among all castes. In Pondicherry, Kamisetty Parasuram Naidu, a Kapu leader from Yanam served as the first deputy speaker of Pondicherry Assembly from 1963–1964. He also served as the speaker of Pondicherry Assembly from 1985–1989.

In 2009 Andhra Pradesh Assembly elections, Kapu community had 19 MLAs — the third-highest among unreserved communities. In the 2019 Andhra Pradesh Assembly elections, 24 Kapus were elected as MLAs, next only to Reddys and higher than Kammas. Together, these three upper castes accounted for nearly two-thirds of unreserved seats in the Assembly. In the past decade, there have been four Kapu Deputy Chief Ministers of Andhra Pradesh — Nimmakayala Chinarajappa (2014–2019), Alla Nani (2019–2022), Kottu Satyanarayana (2022–2024), and Pawan Kalyan (2024–present).

== Kapunadu movement ==
Kapunadu movement was formed in the early 1980s and under the leadership of Vangaveeti Mohana Ranga they demanded quotas for Kapu, Telaga, Balija, and Ontari communities. However, the N. K. Muralidhar Rao commission in 1982 did not recommend quotas for Kapus and noted as follows:

"Kapus are land owners and enjoy social status in the villages. They are already politically conscious and socially forward. On the educational side also they are not backward as the students belonging to the Kapu Community are in considerable number in the educational institutions in the state. The literacy in this community is higher than the state average. There is a good representation from Kapu Community in the employment under the state government, semi-government and local bodies. The Commission thinks that it is not necessary to disturb this."

In early 2016, the Kapus of the residual Andhra Pradesh state launched an agitation demanding quotas, leading to violent protests. Due to the support provided by Kapus in the 2014 assembly elections which helped it come to power, the Telugu Desam Party-led state government allocated 5% quota for Kapus in educational institutions and government jobs in the state. However, this was opposed by the Central Government and was found to be legally untenable. In July 2019, the subsequent YSR Congress government reversed the decision. As of 2024, Kapus do not avail any quotas and are classified as a Forward caste.

== Kapu zamindaris ==
Andhra Vignanamu, Volume 3 (1939) mentions Eluru, Ganapavaram and Akividu in former West Godavari district as places ruled by Telagas. They were called Telaga-prabhuvula-seemalu (transl. Territories of Telaga Lords).

In pre-independent India, many Kapu-Telaga zamindari families with extensive landholdings existed, especially in Godavari districts. Some of them were bestowed with Diwan Bahadur and Rao Bahadur titles. One of the wealthiest zamindaris in former Krishna district was the Vallur Estate of Bommadevara family. Further, Gopisetti Narayanaswami Naidu, a Telaga, was the receiver of Nidadavolu Estate.

Some of the Kapu zamindaris (samsthanams) include:

- Vallur, Krishna district
- Attili, West Godavari district
- Dharmavaram, West Godavari district
- Pūlla, West Godavari district
- Sudhapalem, East Godavari district
- Veeravaram, East Godavari district
- Veeravallipalem, East Godavari district
- Vella, East Godavari district
- Koyyetipadu and Ogidi, West Godavari district
- Danthahundam, Srikakulam district

== Notable people ==
Note: The list only includes people from Kapu and sub-castes (Telaga, Ontari), not Balija, Turpu Kapu, and other castes.

Politics

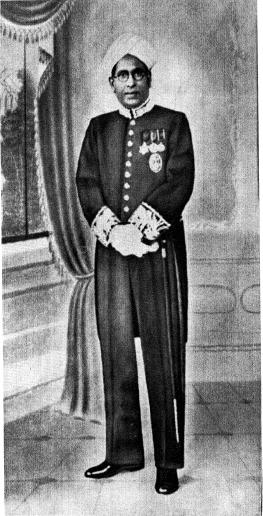
Sir Kurma Venkata Reddi Naidu

- Kurma Venkatareddi Naidu, served as both the Chief Minister and Governor of Madras Presidency — only person to have held both the posts. Member of the Indian delegation to the League of Nations (1928). India's Agent to the Union of South Africa (1929–1932).
- Pasala Suryachandra Rao, 1st Deputy Speaker of Andhra State Assembly (1953–1954)
- Rokkam Lakshmi Narasimham Dora, 2nd Speaker of Andhra State Assembly (1955–1956)
- Kamisetty Parasuram Naidu, 1st Deputy Speaker of Pondicherry Assembly (1963–1964). Speaker of Pondicherry Assembly (1985–1989)
- Mandali Venkata Krishna Rao, former state minister. Chief organiser and convenor of the first World Telugu Conference in 1975
- M. S. Sanjeevi Rao, former Union Minister and chairman of India's first electronics commission. Referred to as "India's father of electronics"
- P. V. Rangayya Naidu, former Union Minister of State for Communications, Power, and Water Resources; ex-Director General of Police
- Ummareddy Venkateswarlu, former Union Minister for Urban Development
- Chegondi Harirama Jogaiah, former Home Minister of Andhra Pradesh
- Vangaveeti Mohana Ranga, prominent leader of Andhra Pradesh politics in 1980s
- Nimmakayala Chinarajappa, Deputy Chief Minister and Home Minister of Andhra Pradesh (2014–2019)
- Kottu Satyanarayana, Deputy Chief Minister of Andhra Pradesh (2022–2024)
- M. M. Pallam Raju, former Union Minister of Human Resources Development and Minister of State for Defence
- Alla Nani, Deputy Chief Minister of Andhra Pradesh (2019–2022)
- Pawan Kalyan, Deputy Chief Minister of Andhra Pradesh (2022–present) and founder of Jana Sena Party

Sports

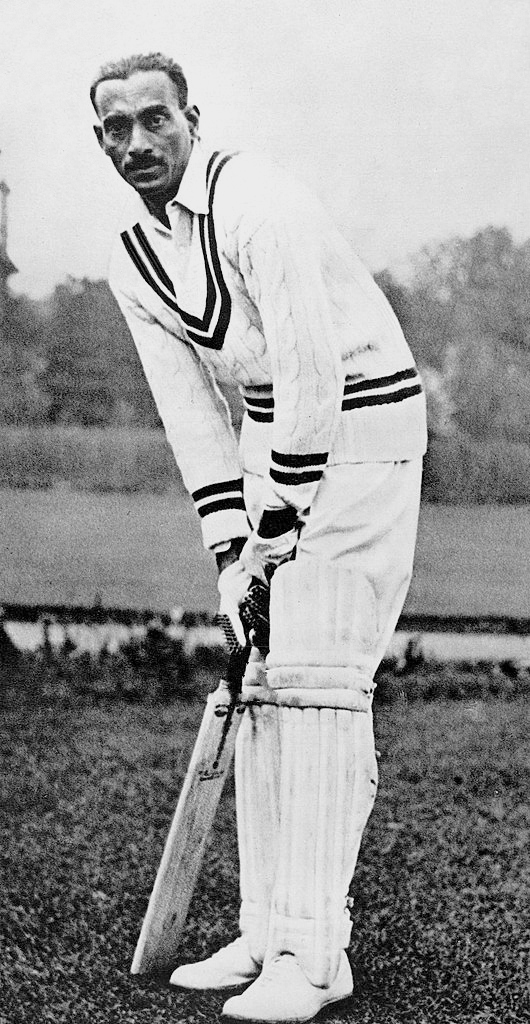
C. K. Nayudu

- Kodi Rammurthy Naidu, strongman, bodybuilder, and wrestler
- C. K. Nayudu, first captain of the Indian cricket team and one of India's greatest cricketers
- C. S. Nayudu, represented India in Test cricket from 1934 to 1952
- Chandra Nayudu, India's first female cricket commentator
- Ambati Rayudu, represented India in international cricket from 2013 to 2019

Social Activists

- Raghupathi Venkataratnam Naidu, social reformer and educationist
- Kanneganti Hanumanthu, freedom fighter who spearheaded the Palnadu Rebellion
- Thota Narasayya Naidu, freedom fighter

Sciences

- Sunkara Balaparameswara Rao, father of neurosurgery in united Andhra Pradesh, recipient of Dr. B. C. Roy award
- M. V. Rao, agricultural scientist considered as one of the key figures in India's Green Revolution. Recipient of Borlaug Award and Padma Shri
- A. V. Rama Rao, inventor and chemist; recipient of Padma Bhushan
- Sunkara Venkata Adinarayana Rao, orthopaedic surgeon and recipient of Padma Shri

Film

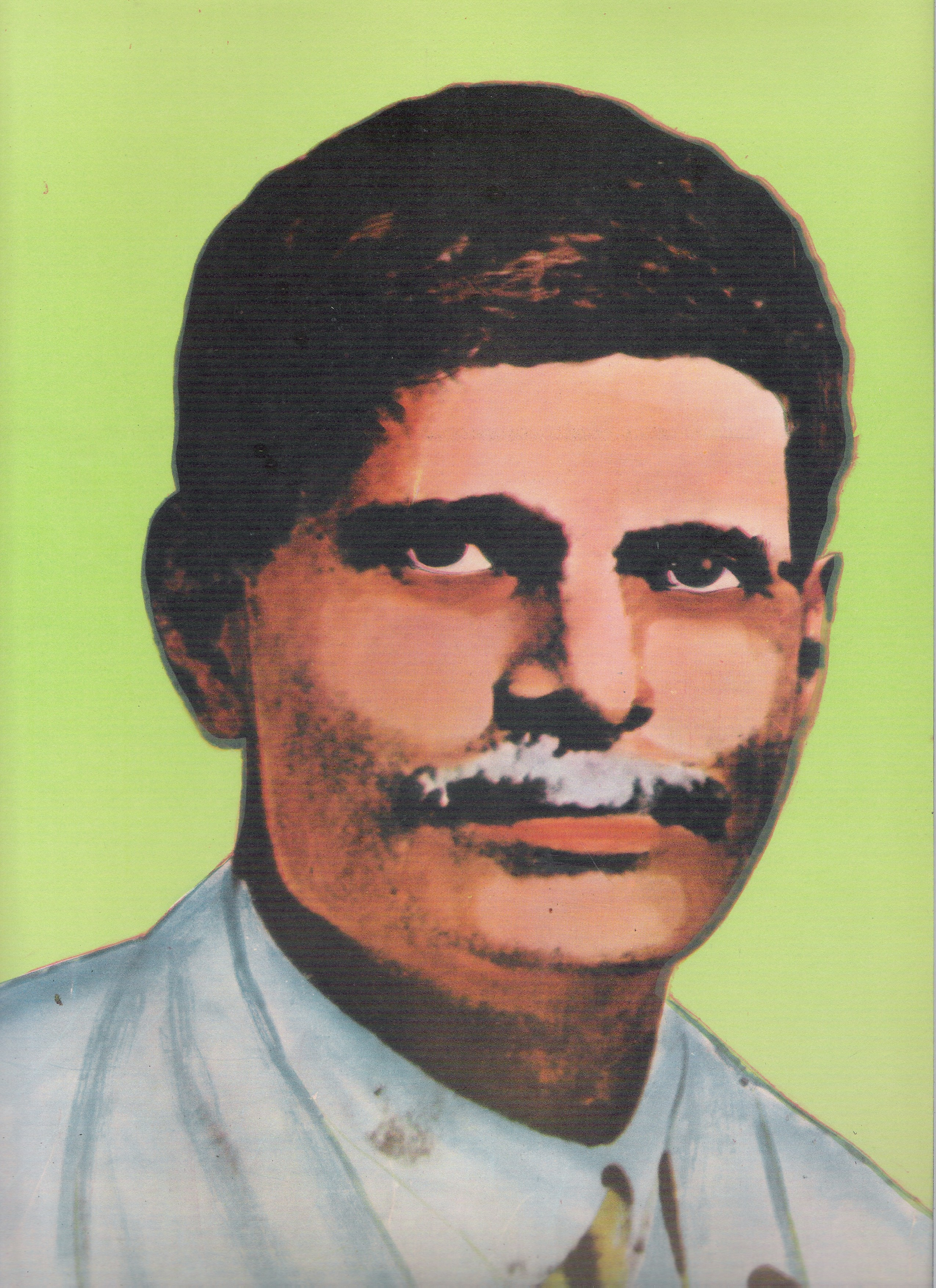
Raghupathi Venkaiah Naidu

- Raghupathi Venkaiah Naidu, first Telugu film producer, exhibitor, and film studio owner; widely regarded as the "father of Telugu cinema"
- Raghupathi Surya Prakash, first director and lead actor of Telugu cinema
- Dasari Kotiratnam, first female producer of Telugu cinema
- Kalyanam Raghuramaiah, film and theatre actor. Recipient of the Sangeet Natak Akademi Award and the Padma Shri.
- S. V. Ranga Rao, actor
- Allu Ramalingaiah, actor and comedian, recipient of Padma Shri
- Ramesh Naidu, music composer; recipient of National Film Award for Best Music Direction
- Edida Nageswara Rao, producer; recipient of multiple National Film Awards
- Kaikala Satyanarayana, actor and politician, recipient of Filmfare Lifetime Achievement Award
- Savitri, actress
- Dasari Narayana Rao, director, actor, and former Union Minister
- Allu Aravind, producer; founder of Geetha Arts and Aha OTT platform
- Kodi Ramakrishna, director; recipient of Raghupathi Venkaiah Award
- Thota Tharani, production designer; recipient of two National Film Awards and Padma Shri
- M. S. Narayana, actor and comedian
- Chiranjeevi, actor
- Chota K. Naidu, cinematographer
- Pawan Kalyan, actor
- Sukumar, director, screenwriter and producer
- Sekhar Kammula, director, screenwriter and producer
- Rambha, actress
- Devi Sri Prasad, music composer
- Allu Arjun, actor
- Ram Charan, actor
- Maadhavi Latha, actress

Arts

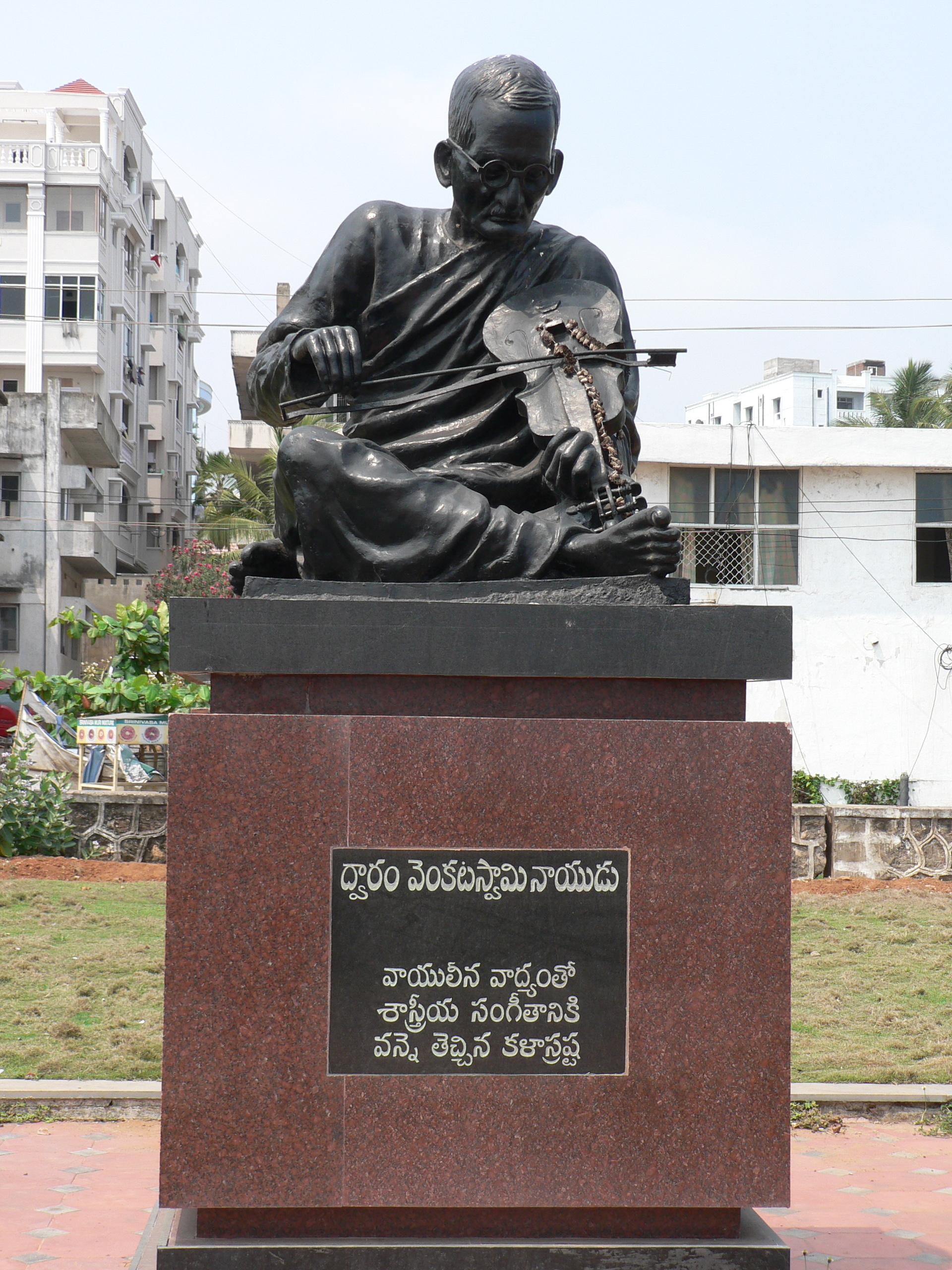
Dwaram Venkataswamy Naidu

- Dwaram Venkataswamy Naidu, Carnatic violinist, recipient of Padma Shri and Sangeet Natak Akademi Award
- Dwaram Durga Prasad Rao, Carnatic violinist, recipient of Sangeet Natak Akademi Award
- Sobha Naidu, Kuchipudi exponent, recipient of Padma Shri and Sangeet Natak Akademi Award

Literature

- Thapi Dharma Rao Naidu, writer, journalist, and social reformer; recipient of the Sahitya Akademi Award. Pioneer of colloquial language in Telugu journalism.
- Tripurana Venkata Surya Prasada Rao, poet, translator and zamindar
- M. Chalapathi Rau, journalist and author regarded as one of India's greatest editors in English journalism; recipient of Padma Bhushan
- Yarramsetti Sai, Telugu-language novelist and short story writer
- Anantha Sriram, lyricist and poet
