= Telaga =

Hindu community in South India

- Classification: Forward caste
- Religions: Hinduism
- Languages: Telugu
- Country: India
- Populated states: Major: Andhra Pradesh; Yanam; Minor: Telangana; Orissa; West Bengal
- Region: South India

Telaga is a land-owning agrarian community primarily found in the Coastal Andhra region of India. Telaga is a subcaste of the Kapu community, with both terms often used interchangeably. They are classified as a forward caste, which are excluded from the scope of affirmative action that groups on SC, ST or OBC lists are entitled to in India. Historically, they were a warrior caste known for their honour and bravery.

The origins of the Telaga community are linked to the Telugu Choda dynasties, particularly the Velanadu chiefs (1076–1216 CE), who ruled Coastal Andhra and gradually came to be identified as Telagas. The community commonly uses the titles Naidu and Dora. The Balija and Ontari communities are closely related to the Telagas.

In the erstwhile districts of East and West Godavari, Krishna, Guntur, and Visakhapatnam, the Telagas have long identified as Kapus, while in Srikakulam and Vizianagaram districts, they are still known as Telagas to differentiate them from the unrelated caste of Turpu Kapus who are also present in the same districts.

== History ==
=== Origins ===
Historians like Etukuru Balaramamurthy and Chintamani Lakshmanna note that Telagas are the descendants of Telugu Choda dynasties like Durjayas of Velanadu (1076–1216 CE) who ruled Coastal Andhra. These Telugu Chodas later came to be called Telagas over a period of time.

Various sources mention Telaga as a historically military caste known for their honour and valour. They were also known as Nayakas and later Naidus. Telaga surnames (intiperlu in Telugu) include names of weapons apart from village names. Surnames like Tupakula (musket), Eetela (spear), Bakula (dagger), Soorakattula (knife), Katari (katar) are found among them. Telagas and Kapus of former Godavari and Visakhapatnam districts are referred to as Pedda Kapu when comparing them with Turpu Kapu.

=== Medieval period ===
An inscription dating to 1205 CE (1127 Saka year) mentions Teliki Kapulu, which K. Iswara Dutt interprets as referring to Telagas.

During the medieval era, many Nayakas belonged to Telaga community along with Velamas and Balijas. In the late medieval era, Telagas led the right-hand caste faction in Machilipatnam and other places of Andhra. The right-hand caste faction included Komatis and various other castes. At the end of the eighteenth century, Telagas, along with Niyogi Brahmins, were the leaders of the Maha-nad, a multi-caste secret assembly that was created to exact retribution for breaking the rules and rights of castes.

There existed Nayak (Telaga) regiments in the Vijayanagara Empire and they later joined the British army after the fall of Vijayanagara. Telagas of Bobbili served as commanders and generals in armies. They formed a major part of the Bobbili army along with Velamas in the famous Battle of Bobbili in 1757. Telagas in British army held ranks such as Major, Naik, Subedar, Jemadar, Havildar etc. When the British reduced their recruitment in the army, Telagas concentrated on agriculture.

First edition of Charles Philip Brown's Telugu-English Dictionary (1852) mentioned Telaga caste as equivalent to Mahanati Kapu (మహనాటి కాపు). Brown also notes that Mahanati Kapus were leaguesmen and members of the Mahanadu community.

H. A. Stuart wrote in 1891, "The Telagas are a Telugu caste of cultivators, who were formerly soldiers in the armies of the Hindu sovereigns of Telingana. (Note: Until the late medieval era, the terms 'Telingana' and 'Andhra' both referred to all of the Telugu-speaking lands. While Andhra was an ancient name, Telingana was first used in the 14th century to refer to the land inhabited by Telugus.) This may perhaps account for the name, for it is easy to see that the Telugu soldiers might come to be regarded as the Telugus or Telagas par excellence". During the colonial era, they were noted to be highly Brahmanised and of a high social position.

=== 20th century ===
The early 20th century witnessed caste consciousness in various social groups of Andhra. A Telaga Mahajana Sabha happened at Railway Koduru in Kadapa district in September 1920. The first Telaga Mahasabha (transl. Telaga Grand Assembly) was held on 7 October 1923 in Machilipatnam and declared 'we are Telagas, we are Kapus'. The second Krishna district Telaga Mahajana Sabha was held in February 1925 in Pūlla under the presidentship of the Zamindar of Vallur, Bommadevara Naganna Naidu.

In 1936, Kurma Venkata Reddi Naidu, a leading advocate and Telaga leader was appointed as the Governor of Madras Presidency, one of the only two Indians in history to have held the post. In 1937, he was elected as the Chief Minister of the Madras Presidency, which included the present-day states of Andhra Pradesh and Tamil Nadu along with parts of Kerala and Karnataka.

Meraka Veedhi in Rajahmundry, Padamati Veedhi in Eluru, Srikakulam, and Bangalore were the localities of some historically prominent Telaga clans.

== Geographical distribution ==
Telagas are found in Coastal Andhra region in the erstwhile districts of Srikakulam, Vizianagaram, Visakhapatnam, East Godavari, West Godavari, Krishna, Guntur, and Prakasam. Telagas in most districts (except Srikakulam and Vizianagaram) are referred to as Kapus in general usage. In Srikakulam and Vizianagaram, they are primarily referred to as Telagas to distinguish them from the more numerous Turpu Kapus who are a distinct caste.

Small communities of Telaga-Kapu also exist in Orissa and Kharagpur, West Bengal. In the 19th and early 20th century, Telagas were among the Telugu migrants to Burma, Malaysia, Mauritius and Fiji. Telagas were said to form the largest caste among the Telugu people of Mauritius. In recent decades, Telagas have migrated to the Anglophone countries like United States.

Telaga, a sub-caste of Kapu, has no relation to the Mudiraj and Teli castes who are sometimes referred to as Telaga.

== Telaga zamindaris ==
Andhra Vignanamu (1939) mentions Eluru, Ganapavaram and Akividu in former West Godavari district as places ruled by Telagas. They were called Telaga-prabhuvula-seemalu (transl. Territories of Telaga Lords).

In pre-independent India, Telaga-Kapu also owned various zamindari estates in Coastal Andhra. K. S. Singh noted, "In East and West Godavari districts, quite a few Telaga zamindari families exist, with extensive landholdings. Some of them were bestowed with Diwan Bahadur and Rao Bahadur titles." One of the wealthiest zamindaris in former Krishna district was the Vallur Estate of Bommadevara family. Further, Gopisetti Narayanaswami Naidu, a Telaga, was the receiver of Nidadavolu Estate.

Some of the Telaga zamindaris (samsthanams) include:

- Vallur, Krishna district
- Dharmavaram, West Godavari district
- Pūlla, West Godavari district
- Sudhapalem, East Godavari district
- Danthahundam, Srikakulam district
- Koyyetipadu and Ogidi, West Godavari district

== Relation to Balija ==
Charles Philip Brown's Telugu-English Dictionary (1852) mentions Telaga-Balija (తెలగ బలిజె) as a caste name. Castes and Tribes of Southern India (1909) notes Telaga as a synonym for Balija in Northern Circars. Alvin Texas Fishman wrote in a 1941 study that the main body of Balijas is called Telaga. Andhra Vignanamu (1939) mentions four sections among Telaga caste — Telagas (or Naidus), Ontaris (or Doras), Balijas, and Kapus. Mallampalli Somasekhara Sarma (1946) noted that the Telaga community has three sections — Telaga (proper), Kapu, and Ontari. According to Etukuru Balarama Murthy, Balijas residing in one part of Telugu land are addressed as Telagas.

Various sources note the similarities between Kapu, Telaga, Balija, and Ontari communities and these terms are often used as synonyms. Andhra Pradesh government's Kapu Welfare and Development Corporation refers to Kapu, Telaga, Balija, and Ontari communities collectively as Kapu.

== Political participation ==
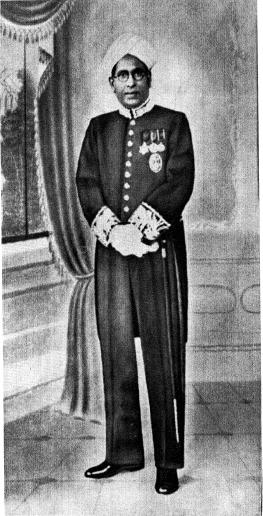
Sir Kurma Venkata Reddi Naidu in 1940

During the 1920s and 1930s, the Telaga community, along with other feudal landed castes, were major supporters of the Justice Party. Prominent Telaga-Kapu personalities like Raghupati Venkataratnam Naidu and Kurma Venkata Reddi Naidu were members of the Justice Party. In the government formed after the first legislative council election to Madras Presidency in December 1920, Venkata Reddy Naidu was one of the three ministers in the Cabinet. In 1936, he was appointed as the Governor of Madras Presidency, one of the only two Indians in history to have held the post. In 1937, he was elected as the Chief Minister of the Madras Presidency.

Selig S. Harrison noted that, in the 1955 legislature of what was then Andhra State, the Telagas had 16 legislators, next only to the Reddis and Kammas. He states that they formed a "newly active political force". Rokkam Lakshmi Narasimham Dora, a Telaga from Srikakulam district served as the second speaker of Andhra State Assembly from 1955 to 1956.

In 1982, Telagas joined the other Kapu castes to form the Kapunadu movement, launched in Vijayawada. The movement held annual/biannual meetings since then. For the 1983 election for the united Andhra Pradesh, the Kapus, in general, supported the newly formed Telugu Desam Party. Among the elected, the Telagas made up six legislators, compared to nine legislators belonging to other Kapu castes from the coastal districts. According to scholar Balagopal, "The Munnuru Kapus, Balijas, Telagas are collectively referred to as 'Kapus'". They attempted to consolidate into a single community, but "it has remained un-consummated".

== Status ==
During the colonial era, Telagas were noted to be of a high social position. In a 1965 study on the history of Guntur district, Robert Eric Frykenberg called Telaga, "a high caste with a tradition of military and police employment." He also categorized them among "elite agricultural (warrior) castes." In 1976, Christopher John Baker in his work on South Indian political history called Telaga, "a respectable cultivator caste of Andhra." In 1982, Barbara D. Miller of Syracuse University noted, "Generally the Telaga-Kapu rank fairly high in status".

Telagas are a community of land-owners and are one of the dominant communities of Andhra Pradesh. In recent years, Telaga along with other related Kapu communities launched an agitation demanding quotas. However, the quota accorded to Kapus was found to be legally untenable. As of 2023, Telagas do not avail any caste-based quotas or reservations and are classified as a Forward caste both by the Central Government of India as well as the Andhra Pradesh Government.

== Notable people ==
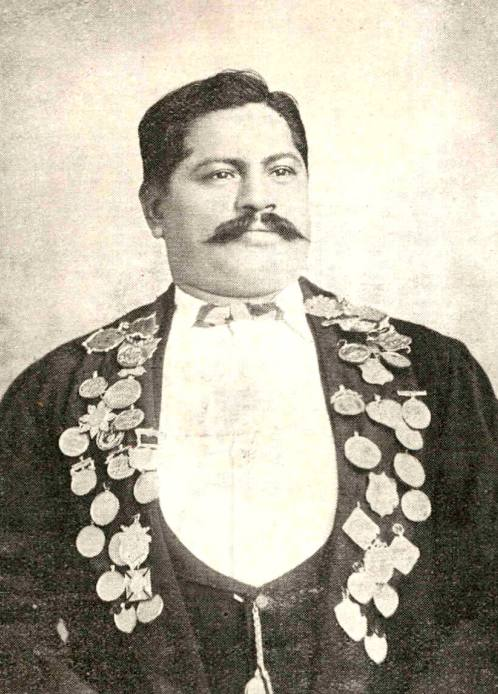
Kodi Rammurthi Naidu

- Raghupati Venkataratnam Naidu, social reformer and educationist
- Raghupathi Venkaiah Naidu, first Telugu film producer, exhibitor, and film studio owner; widely regarded as the "father of Telugu cinema"
- Kanneganti Hanumanthu, freedom fighter who spearheaded the Palnadu Rebellion
- Kurma Venkata Reddi Naidu, served as both the Chief Minister and Governor of Madras Presidency — only person to have held both the posts. Member of the Indian delegation to the League of Nations (1928). India's Agent to the Union of South Africa (1929–1932)
- Kodi Rammurthy Naidu, strongman, bodybuilder, and wrestler and an important figure in India’s physical culture history; known by the epithets "Indian Hercules" and "Kaliyuga Bhima"
- Tripurana Venkata Surya Prasada Rao, poet, translator and zamindar
- Dwaram Venkataswamy Naidu, Carnatic violinist, recipient of Padma Shri and Sangeet Natak Akademi Award
- Rokkam Lakshmi Narasimham Dora, 2nd speaker of Andhra State Legislative Assembly (1955–1956)
- Kamisetty Parasuram Naidu, 1st deputy speaker of Pondicherry Legislative Assembly (1963–1964). Speaker of Pondicherry Legislative Assembly (1985–1989)
