= Sunkara =

Sunkara is a Telugu surname. Notable people with this surname include:

- Bhaskar Sunkara, an American socialist writer and publisher.
- Sunkara Rao (disambiguation)
  - Sunkara Balaparameswara Rao, an Indian neurosurgeon.
  - Sunkara Venkata Adinarayana Rao (born 1939), an Indian orthopaedic surgeon
