= Sunkara Rao =

Sunkara Rao may refer to:

- Sunkara Balaparameswara Rao (born 1928), Indian neurosurgeon
- Sunkara Venkata Adinarayana Rao (born 1939), Indian orthopaedic surgeon

== See also ==
- Sunkara (disambiguation)
- Rao (disambiguation)
