= Kalingi =

Hindu caste in Andhra Pradesh and Odisha

Kalinga is a caste residing in the Indian states of Andhra Pradesh and Odisha. In Andhra, they are primarily found in the erstwhile Srikakulam and Vizianagaram districts with smaller numbers in neighbouring districts. They are predominantly cultivators. Some of the community members also served as temple priests in the past.

== Demographics ==
Kālingas are one of the dominant castes of Srikakulam district along with Turpu Kapu and Polinati Velama. Kālingas form around 10 percent of the total population of former Srikakulam district. They are heavily concentrated in the talukas of Sompeta, Tekkali and parts of Srikakulam and Palakonda in the district.

== Divisions ==
In the Telugu parts, the caste is called Kalinga or Kālingi and in the Oriya country they are known as Kālinji.

There are four further divisions among Kalingas like Buragam and Kinthali Kalingas. The other two unpopularly subgroups were Kalinga Brahmana with titles Panda, Patro, Sahoo, Bagadi, Panigrahi and Kalinga Raju. Both Kinthala and Buragam Kalingas are categorized as General by the Government of Andhra Pradesh. Kinthala widows are permitted to remarry if they have no male heir, but Buragam widows are not.
