= Ontari =

Ontari may refer to:

- Ontari (caste)
- Ontari (film)
- Ontari (The 100)
