= Mekavaripalem =

- Village
- Interactive map of Mekavaripalem
- Location within Andhra Pradesh
- Coordinates: 16°06′15″N 80°54′30″E
- Country: India
- State: Andhra Pradesh
- District: Krishna
- Time zone: UTC+5:30 (IST)

Mekavaripalem is a village in Machilipatnam South mandal, Krishna district in the state of Andhra Pradesh in India, area pin code number are 521126, division name is Machilipatnam. This village was initially formed by the Meka families in the outskirts of Pagolu.

The nearest town is Challapalli. This village is a part of the Andhra Pradesh Capital Region under the jurisdiction of APCRDA in the vicinity of Pagolu village.

The family of Tollywood actor Meka Srikanth originally hails from this village.
