= P. Chenna Reddy =

Indian archaeologist born in 1959

P. Chenna Reddy (Dr. Pedarapu Chenna Reddy) born on 15 July 1959 at Anantapur. He is currently the Director, Archaeology and Museums Government of Andhra Pradesh.

== Early life ==
Born in a remote village in Anantapur as the fifth child of P. Malli Reddy and Chandramma. P. Chenna Reddy was educated initially in that village. He continued his education at Anantapur in Rayalaseema and completed his intermediate, degree in Bachelor of Arts and Master of Arts in History.

Between 1986 and 1998 he pursued further education in History at Sri Venkateswara University, Tirupathi, and was awarded a MPhil and then a PhD for his thesis Guilds in Medieval Andhradesa. His interest in epigraphy resulted in a post-graduate diploma in that subject, awarded in 1998 by the same university.

== Career ==
Soon after he assumed Charge as Director Department of Archaeology & Museums, Government of Andhra Pradesh, he brought a sea change. He took the initiative on an innovative scheme "Heritage Wealth Management System "and that will have full-fledged records of all the protected sites and monuments declared by the department under the provisions of Ancient Monuments and Archaeological Sites and Remains Act. He successfully removed unauthorized encroachments at the monuments of the Badshahi Ashroorkhana and the Paigha Tombs.

== Publications ==
- Sahiti-Saurabha: Studies in Indian Culture and Literature: Festschrift to Dr. Janamaddi Hanumath Sastri
- Krishnabhinandana: Archaeological, Historical and Cultural Studies
- Saundaryashri: Studies of Indian History, Archaeology, Literature & Philosophy (Festschrift to Professor Anantha Adiga Sundara) (In 5 Volumes)
- Riches of Indian Archaeological and Cultural Studies (In 2 Volumes)
- Readings in Society and Religion of Medieval South India
- Recent Trends in Historical Studies (Festschrift to Professor Ravula Soma Reddy)
