= Adinarayana Rao =

Adinarayana Rao may refer to:

- S. V. Adinarayana Rao (born 1939), Indian orthopaedic surgeon
- P. Adinarayana Rao (1915–1991), Telugu film music composer, and producer
