= Bandaru (surname) =

Bandaru (Telugu: బండారు) is a Telugu surname. Notable people with the surname include:

- Bandaru Acchamamba (1874–1905), Indian feminist historian
- Bandaru Ayyappa (born 1992), Indian politician
- Bandaru Dattareya (born 1947), Indian politician
- Bandaru Madhava Naidu, Indian politician
- Bandaru Satyananda Rao (born 1965), Indian politician
- Bandaru Satyanarayana Murthy, Indian politician
- Bandaru Sravani Sree (born 1990), Indian politician
