= Daniel Negers =

French professor

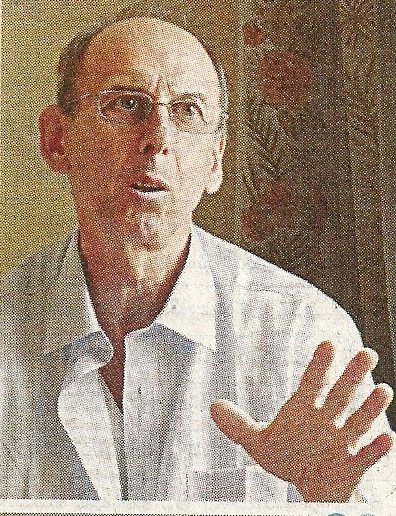
- Born: Paris, France
- Occupation: Professor
- Employer: National Institute for Oriental Languages and Civilisations

Daniel Negers is a French professor who has done extensive study of Telugu language and culture. He has translated knowledge of Telugu into French. He taught Telugu language to French students.

== Early life ==
Daniel Negers was born in Paris, France.

== Career ==
Negers first came to India in the 1970s as a tourist and returned to Peddapuram, a town in Andhra Pradesh, India, in 1983 along with his wife for his field study on a Telugu folk tradition called Burrakatha. He developed an interest in the culture and learned to speak and write the local language. He was trained under Devadula Brahmanandam. After the death of Brahmanandam, his companion Allada Rama Rao helped him complete his research. During his research, his family stayed in Peddapuram. He dedicated his book on Burrakatha to Nazar, who is known for spreading awareness of this art.

He studied the writings of poets such as Palkuriki Somana, Gurajada Apparao, Rayaprolu Subbarao, and Ravuri Bharadwaja. He translated poems by Vemana into French. He wrote a French–Telugu dictionary.

He was felicitated by the Telugu Association of Netherlands (TANE) at its Ugadi celebrations in 2014. Daniel Negers was felicitated in 2015 in Visakhapatnam on the occasion of the 11th annual Lok Nayak Foundation awards ceremony. He was awarded INR 50,000 for his contribution to the spread of the Telugu language and culture. In 2021, he met the IT Minister of Telangana, K. T. Rama Rao, in Paris.
