= Pasala Suryachandra Rao =

Indian politician

- పసల సూర్యచంద్రరావు

1st Deputy Speaker of Andhra State Legislative Assembly
- In office 24 November 1953 – 15 November 1954
- Governor: Chandulal Madhavlal Trivedi
- Succeeded by: Kalluru Subba Rao

Personal details
- Died: 17 January 2004
- Party: Kisan Mazdoor Praja Party

Pasala Suryachandra Rao was an Indian freedom fighter and politician who served as the first Deputy Speaker of Andhra State Legislative Assembly from 1953 to 1954. He was an MLA from Kisan Mazdoor Praja Party and represented Alampuram constituency in West Godavari district. He was also elected to Andhra Pradesh Legislative Council two times. He belonged to the Kapu community. He died on 17 January 2004. After his death, his assets were mired in controversial land deals.
