= Rayaprolu Subba Rao =

Indian writer (1892–1984)

- Born: 17 March 1892; Bapatla taluka, Guntur district, Madras Presidency, British India
- Died: 30 June 1984 (aged 92)
- Writing career
- Pen name: Abhinava Nannaya
- Genres: Poet, lyricist, translator
- Notable work: Andhravali

Rayaprolu Subbarao (1892–1984) was among the pioneers of modern Telugu literature. He is known as Abhinava Nannaya. He was recipient of Sahitya Akademi Award to Telugu Writers for his poetic work Misra Manjari in 1965. He was inspired by the Western literary movement and brought romanticism into Telugu literature by breaking away from the traditional translations of Sanskrit literature. He introduced the concept of "Amalina Shringara Tatvamu" into Telugu literature.

== Early life ==
Rao was born in Garlapadu village, Kakumanu Mandal, Guntur district. His maternal uncle, Avvari Subramanya Sastri, initially taught him Sanskrit and Telugu. He attended the Board High School in Bapatla and was later educated in Kakinada and Rajahmundry.

He assisted Komarraju Venkata Lakshmana Rao in the preparation of Andhra Vignana Sarvasvamu.

Department of Telugu in Osmania University, Hyderabad was started in 1919. He was the professor and head of this department for 25 years. Khandavalli Lakshmi Ranjanam, Divakarla Venkata Avadhani, B. Rama Raju and C. Narayana Reddy were associated with him as faculty.

He was the chief editor of Andhra Maha Bhagavatam published by Telugu Academi, Hyderabad.

== Style ==
Subbarao's literature is a mixture of Telugu Indian culture and Western ideas. He brought Western romanticism especially English lyric style to Telugu literature. However, he followed classical Sanskrit and Telugu meter in his writings and he didn't abandon Sanskrit Telugu form common language. His literature themes include sensual material, love of nature, patriotism, spirituality, humanitarianism and social reforms. Sensuality, in general, may be divided into two kinds, union and separation. Rayaprolu preferred separation in his writings. Rayaprolu was a great patriot and Telugu nationalist. He praised the (past) greatness of Telugu warriors to awaken the sleeping Telugu pride. Rayaprolu Subbarao defined Telugu romanticism and began a new era in Telugu literature. His romantic literature is considered as the watershed in Telugu literature for its modernity of themes such as naturalism, rural life, platonic love, a sense of history, libertarianism, patriotism, and fierce nationalism.

=== Trunakankanamu ===
In his first independent poem, Trunakankanamu, Rayaprolu narrates love pangs of separation. The hero's lover marries another man and he remains unmarried to suffer from the memories. By the end of the poem, hero's love transforms into a platonic love and friendship. In this poem, Rayaprolu's heroin continues a platonic relationship with the hero while married to another man. In Kastakamala, Kamala loves (platonic) two men. However, when one of them writes a love letter, she commits suicide.

== Edesamegina Endukalidina ==
His poem "Edesamegina Endukalidina" is very popular.

One patriotic verse by Subba Rao, "Edesamegina Endukalidina" (also known as "Janmabhumi"), is a perennial favourite, being regularly sung and recited. It was particularly popular for public events in the pre-Independence Andhra region. The verse has been adapted many times into song for use in Telugu films.

Edesamegina endukalidina
epeetamekkina evaremanina
Pogadara neetalli bhoomi Bharatini
Nilupara neejaati nindu gauravamu.

— Janmabhumi ('Motherland')
Translation:

To whichever country you go,
and wherever you place your feet,
Whatever honour you get,
and whatever people say,
Praise Bharati, your motherland,
Hold aloft your nation’s (full) honour.

— Translation by A. Viswam

== Honours ==
- Sri Rayaprolu Subba Rao was awarded Kalaprapoorna from Andhra University in 1977.
- Sri Rayaprolu Subba Rao was awarded Sahitya Akademi Award in 1965.

== Works ==
=== Translations ===
- Anumati (Permission)
- Bhaja Govindamu (Prayer to Govinda) (Telugu translation of Shankaracharya's Bhaja Govindham)
- Soundarya Lahari (Below of Beauty) (Telugu translation of Shankaracharya's Soundarya Lahari)
- Sundara Kanda (Beauty Section) (Telugu translation of Valmiki Ramayana)
- Dootha Mattebhamu (Messenger Elephant)
- Lalitha (Telugu translation of The Hermit of [Oliver Goldsmith])
- Madhukalasamu (Liquor Pitcher) (Telugu rendering of Rubaiyat of Omar Khayyam)
- Meghaduta (Telugu translation of Kalidasa's work)
- Uttararama Charitha (Telugu translation of Bhavabhuti's work)

=== Independent works ===
- Trunakankanamu (Grass Bracelet)
- Andhravali (Andhra Row)
- Kashta Kamala (Kamala in Distress)
- Ramyalokamu (Beautiful Sight)
- Swapnakumaramu
- Telugutoata (Telugu Garden)
- Vanamala (Forest Necklace)
- Misra Manjari (Mixed Bouquet)
- Kannepatalu (Virgin Songs)
- Jadakutchulu (Braid Tassels)
