= America Abbayi =

- Theatrical release poster
- Directed by: Singeetam Srinivasa Rao
- Written by: R. V. S. Ramaswamy (dialogue)
- Screenplay by: Singeetam Srinivasa Rao; D. Madhusudhana Rao
- Story by: J. Ramachandra Murthy
- Produced by: D. Madhusudhana Rao
- Starring: Radhika; Ashwini; Rajasekhar; Charan Raj; Master Shravan Shankar; Kaikala Satyanarayana; Gummadi
- Cinematography: Hari Anumolu
- Edited by: M. S. Mani; K. Govindhu
- Music by: Saluri Rajeswara Rao
- Production company: Annapurna Pictures
- Distributed by: Jayalakshmi Movies
- Release date: 1 January 1987
- Running time: 126 minutes
- Country: India
- Languages: Telugu; English

America Abbayi (transl. American Boy) is a 1987 Indian Telugu-language, drama film directed by Singeetam Srinivasa Rao and produced by D. Madhusudhana Rao. The film features an ensemble cast consisting of Radhika, Ashwini, Rajasekhar, Charan Raj, Master Shravan Shankar, Kaikala Satyanarayana and Gummadi.

The film was primarily shot in the United States, most notably in the Midwest area, and surrounding landmarks such as the Hurley Medical Center, the Renaissance Center, the "Sri Venkateswara Swami Temple of Greater Chicago" in Aurora, Illinois, Cedar Point Amusement Park in Ohio, McLaren Flint, and Dow Gardens, Midland, Michigan.

== Plot ==
The plot revolves around young Raja (Master Shravan Shankar), the son of an Indian American, medical doctor Jyotsna (Ashwini). Jyotsna works at the Hurley Medical Center and lives with her father, Sivaram (Kaikala Satyanarayana) and younger sister, Pratima. She travels to India for a vacation, and meets her friend, Sarada (Radhika). During her visit, Sarada's father, Raja Rao (Gummadi Venkateswara Rao) suffers a heart attack. Jyotsna is then introduced to Sarada's husband, Shekhar (Charan Raj), a businessman who is into international trade.

Later, it is revealed that Raja is the son of Sarada, and her first husband Sudhakar (Chandra Mohan) who died in a road accident the day of their wedding. Subsequently, Jyotsna adopts Raja, and requests Sarada to get married and lead a normal life. Upon knowing this truth, Sarada's husband Shekhar vents out his frustration at Sarada for not revealing this before their wedding. In the meantime, Raja Rao's health deteriorates, and the family moves to the U.S. for Raja Rao's treatment with the help of Shekhar and Jyotsna. Raja Rao undergoes surgery in the U.S. and slowly recuperates. Pradeep (Rajasekhar) along with his friend (Y. G. Mahendran) work as Chauffeurs sponsored by Sivaram. Sivaram introduces Jyotsna to Pradeep, and they both fall in love. On the other hand, Shekhar moves to a different house with his wife Sarada.

In a shocking twist, on the night of a dinner party, Raja witnesses the murder of an unidentified woman by Shekhar in the backyard of Shekhar's new home. It is revealed that Shekhar is about to marry Rita (Elizabeth), an American (whose homicide young Raja witnessed), and they are into drug trafficking in the U.S. Later, when Pradeep confronts Shekhar about these events, and his agenda to kill Raja and divorce Sarada, so that Shekhar can take over the property deed of Raja, Shekhar disagrees Pradeep's allegations. While Raja is performing a Telugu song at his school cultural event, Shekhar tries to shoot Raja, and in the ensuing fight Shekhar kills Sarada. The rest of the plot deals with how Pradeep and Jyotsna rescue Raja from the shackles of Shekhar.

== Cast ==
- Radhika as Sarada
- Ashwini as Jyotsna
- Rajasekhar as Pradeep
- Charan Raj as Shekhar
- Master Shravan Shankar as Raja
- Kaikala Satyanarayana as Raja
- Gummadi as Raja Rao
- Y. G. Mahendran as Pradeep's friend
- Gunasekhar
- Sushma
- Manju
- Chandra Mohan
- Elizabeth

== Soundtrack ==
The soundtrack was composed by Saluri Rajeswara Rao with lyrics composed by veterans C. Narayana Reddy and Aarudhra; the classic track "Edesamegina Endukalidina" received cult following.

No.	Title	Lyrics	Singer(s)	Length
1.	"Devuni Daya Vunte"	Aarudhra	S. P. Balasubrahmanyam	3:42
2.	"Giligintala Totalo"	Aarudhra	S. P. Balasubrahmanyam, P. Susheela	3:50
3.	"Kannatalli Deevena"	Aarudhra	P. Susheela	3:40
4.	"Palukavaa Priya"	Aarudhra	S. P. Balasubrahmanyam, P. Susheela	4:05
5.	"Palukave Ragaveena"	Aarudhra	P. Susheela	4:02
6.	"Edesamegina Endukalidina"	C. Narayana Reddy	P. Susheela	4:12
