= Tripurana Venkata Surya Prasada Rao =

Indian poet (1889–1945)

Tripurana Venkata Surya Prasada Rao Dora
- త్రిపురాన వేంకట సూర్యప్రసాదరాయకవి
- Born: 31 October 1889; Siddhantam, Srikakulam district, Madras Presidency, British India (present-day Andhra Pradesh, India)
- Died: 1945 (aged 56)
- Occupations: Poet, translator
- Writing career
- Language: Telugu

Tripurana Venkata Surya Prasada Rao Dora (1889–1945) was an Indian poet, translator and zamindar. He translated Sanskrit works like Raghuvaṃsam, Kumarasambhavam, Kiratarjuniyam, Uttara Ramacharita into Telugu. He also translated Shakespeare's King Lear into Telugu. His Bharata Dharma Darsanam (1910) inspired younger Telugu poets. His translations were noted for their correctness. He was awarded the title of Kalaprapurna by the Andhra University in 1943.

== Early life ==
Tripurana Venkata Surya Prasada Rao Dora was born in a Telaga Kapu family on 31 October 1889 in Siddhantam village of Srikakulam district. His father was the noted poet Tripurana Tammayya Dora (1849–1890) and his mother was Narayanamma. Tripurana family were the holders of a proprietary estate called Danthahundam in Srikakulam district.

== Career ==
On 18 July 1922, Tripurana Venkata Surya Prasada Rao was honoured by Emperor George V's son Prince of Wales in Madras Senate Hall with a golden bracelet. He was elected as the president of the Andhra Sahitya Parishad annual meeting held in Ballari in 1927. He was also an honorary court poet of Jeypore Estate.

== Bibliography ==
- Nirvachana Kumarasambhavam (1913)
- Raghudayamu (1924)
- Rati Vilapamu (1926)
- Moyilu Rayabaramu (1940)
