= Edesamegina Endukalidina =

Song
- Genre: Patriotic song
- Composer: S. Rajeswara Rao
- Lyricist: Rayaprolu Subba Rao

Edesamegina Endukalidina (Telugu: ఏ దేశమేగినా ఎందుకాలిడినా) is patriotic poem in Telugu written by Rayaprolu Subba Rao. It is also known as "Janmabhumi."

The poem is a perennial favourite in Andhra Pradesh and among the Telugu diaspora. It was popular for public events in the pre-Independence Andhra region.

Subba Rao coined the term "amalina srngara" to refer to patriotic love for one's "country, language, and culture."

== Translation ==
Edesamegina endukalidina
epeetamekkina evaremanina
Pogadara neetalli bhoomi Bharatini
Nilupara neejaati nindu gauravamu.

— Janmabhumi ('Motherland')
Translation:

To whichever country you go,
and wherever you place your feet,
Whatever honour you get,
and whatever people say,
Praise Bharati, your motherland,
Hold aloft your nation’s (full) honour.

— Translation by A. Viswam

== In film ==
The verse has been adapted into song for use in Telugu films. It is incorporated in the 1954 Telugu film Parivartana. A modified version of this song written by C. Narayana Reddy is featured in America Abbayi (1987) directed by Singeetam Srinivasa Rao. The music score is provided by S. Rajeswara Rao.
