= Rokkam Lakshmi Narasimham Dora =

Indian politician

- రొక్కం లక్ష్మి నరసింహం దొర

2nd Speaker of Andhra State Legislative Assembly
- In office 23 April 1955 – 3 December 1956
- Governor: Chandulal Madhavlal Trivedi
- Preceded by: Nallapati Venkatramaiah
- Constituency: Tekkali

Rokkam Lakshmi Narasimham Dora was an Indian politician who served as the second Speaker of Andhra State Legislative Assembly from April 1955 to December 1956. He was elected as an MLA from Tekkali constituency for two terms — in 1952 as an independent and in 1955 as a Congress candidate.

Lakshmi Narasimham Dora was born in a family of freedom fighters belonging to the Telaga Kapu community of Srikakulam district. He was a lawyer by profession. He served as Srikakulam Bar Association President, member of Ganjam district board, and member of Andhra University senate. In 1951, he became the first president of Srikakulam district board.

The Rokkam Lakshmi Narasimham Dora Educational Society was established in his memory. The society established a B. Ed. college in Srikakulam named R. L. N. Dora College of Education in 2006.
