= Andhra Vignana Sarvasvam =

Telugu general knowledge encyclopedia

Andhra Vignana Sarvasvamu
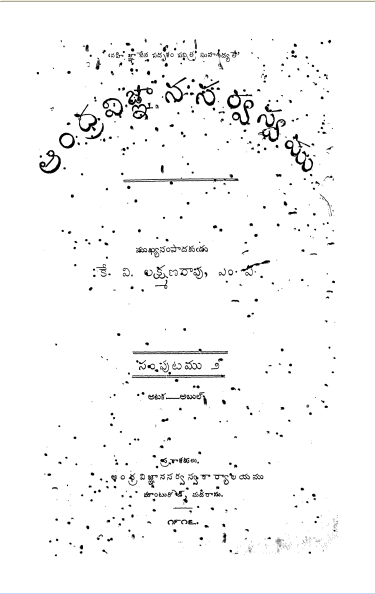
- Cover of Volume 2 (First Edition)
- Editor: Komarraju Venkata Lakshmana Rao
- Language: Telugu
- Subject: General
- Genre: Encyclopedia
- Publication date: 1915–1917; 1932–1934 (Revised edition)
- Publication place: India
- Media type: Print

Andhra Vignana Sarvasvam (transl. 'Andhra Encyclopedia') is a Telugu-language general knowledge encyclopedia initiated by Komarraju Venkata Lakshmana Rao in 1912–1913. Modelled after the Encyclopaedia Britannica, it aimed to provide systematic documentation of global knowledge for Telugu readers. Described as the first modern encyclopedia project in any South Indian language, it is considered important in Telugu literature for its scholarly approach and commitment to accessibility.

The encyclopedia was first published in serialized installments, with the initial three volumes addressing a broad range of topics, including science, linguistics, history, and art. Lakshmana Rao was the chief editor and principal author, supported by contributions from other scholars. The project faced challenges, including resource constraints and Lakshmana Rao's death in 1923.

Following a period of inactivity, the project was revived in the early 1930s under the leadership of Kasinathuni Nageswara Rao, who oversaw the publication of revised editions. However, the encyclopedia remained incomplete. Between 1938 and 1941, Kandukuri Prasada Bhupaludu, the zamindar of Devidi Estate, published Andhra Vignanamu, a seven-volume work regarded as the first complete encyclopedia in Telugu.

== Background ==
Komarraju Venkata Lakshmana Rao, conceived Andhra Vignana Sarvasvam in 1912 as an encyclopedia for the Telugu-speaking community. He was the chief editor and primary contributor.

== Contributors ==
Andhra Vignana Sarvasvam had contributions from 17 prominent scholars of the time, including Gadicherla Harisarvottama Rao, Achanta Lakshmipati, Mallampalli Somasekhara Sarma, and Rayaprolu Subba Rao. The team conducted extensive research, often utilizing resources from the Connemara Public Library in Madras (Chennai). Lakshmana Rao authored the majority of the articles.

== Content ==
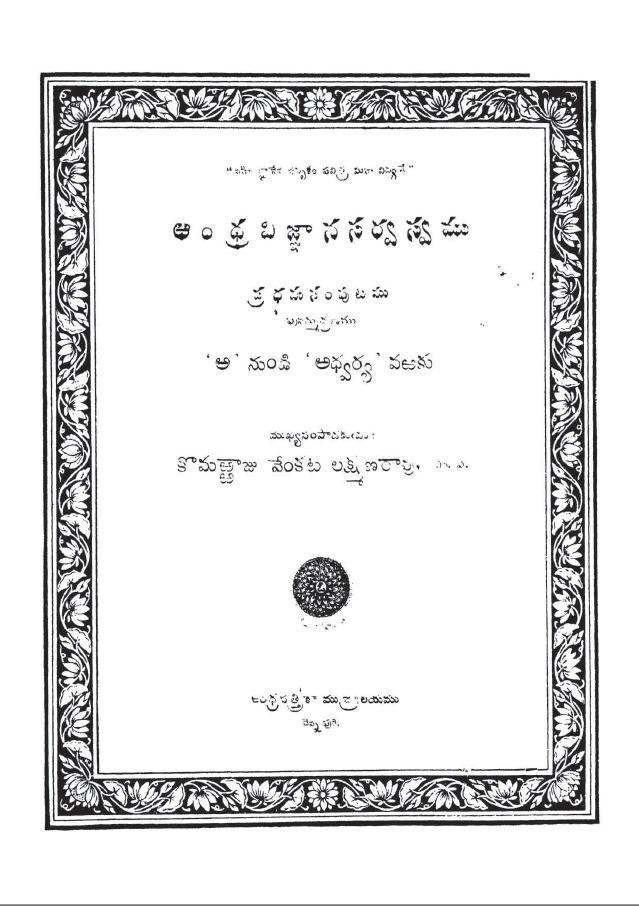
Cover of Volume 2 (Revised Edition)

The encyclopedia was initially published in monthly installments, each consisting of around 100 pages. The first three volumes, covering the Telugu letter "అ" ("A"), included approximately 100 essays on topics such as science, linguistics, astronomy, history, and art. Lakshmana Rao wrote about 40 of these essays, addressing subjects like Advaita, aesthetics, Ashtadasa Mahapuranas, Atharvaveda, Abhignana Sakuntalam, and Ashtadhyayi. Due to limited resources, the volumes were printed on newsprint, which also hindered proper illustration.

After completing the first three volumes, Lakshmana Rao began work on a volume focused on Telugu culture, history, and literature, titled Andhra. Research on Telugu subjects was still in its infancy, necessitating original investigations, including the study of inscriptions and ancient texts. This effort was interrupted by his declining health, particularly due to asthma. He briefly recovered in Madanapalle, then died on July 12, 1923, before completing the project. As a result, only the first three volumes, covering the letter "అ," were published in 1915, 1916, and 1917, bringing the project to an unfortunate end.

Following the death of Lakshmana Rao, the project stalled. Kasinathuni Nageswara Rao, the editor of Andhra Patrika, later revived the work. Instead of continuing the preparation and publication of new volumes, Nageswara Rao, a scholar and patron of literature, focused on revising the already published volumes, incorporating additional material, maps, and illustrations. The revised editions of the first two volumes were published in 1932 and 1934, each in two neatly bound volumes of approximately 600 pages, with contributions from various scholars. Nageswara Rao died while the third volume was still in press, which led to the permanent cessation of the project.

== Volumes ==
Publication year	Volume number
1915	I
1916	II
1917	III
1932	I (Revised Edition)
1934	II (Revised Edition)

== Reception ==
Contemporary reviews said it had detailed research and original content, commending the effort despite challenges such as limited resources and lack of governmental support. The encyclopedia is considered a significant attempt to document Telugu knowledge and reflects the contributions of Komarraju Venkata Lakshmana Rao and other scholars involved in the project.

The Encyclopaedia of Indian Literature said, "Though the project had to be abandoned due to lack of proper planning and the unduly ambitious nature of its coverage, the fact that the volumes are still valued as reference books in libraries, speaks of the sincerity and profound erudition that went into the making of the volumes."

The work is frequently cited in scholarly publications related to Andhra and Telugu culture.
