= Thota Narasayya Naidu =

Indian freedom fighter

- Born: Pagolu, Machilipatnam, Andhra Pradesh
- Other names: Flag Hero, Freedom Fighter
- Occupation: Wrestler
- Known for: Salt March in Machilipatnam

Thota Narasayya Naidu (also spelled as Thota Narasaiah Naidu) was an Indian freedom fighter and a resident of Pagolu taluk, Machilipatnam (present-day Andhra Pradesh). He was a wrestler by profession and served in the court of the Challapalli Zamindar.

On 6 May 1930, there was rioting across India due to the arrest of Mahatma Gandhi for leading the Dandi March. In Machilipatnam, Naidu, along with other leaders, led a protest against this arrest.

Naidu, along with two other leaders, tried to hoist the Swaraj flag at the top of a tall pillar located at the center of the Koneru Center. To stop the protest and the flag hoist, the police started to rain severe blows on them. They lost their grip and were severely bruised; however, they continued to chant slogans. Naidu took the flag and hoisted it on top of the pillar. After 45 minutes of being beaten by the police, he collapsed from the top of the pillar and suffered severe injuries.
