= Bandaru Acchamamba =

Indian-born feminist historian

Bhandaru Acchamamba
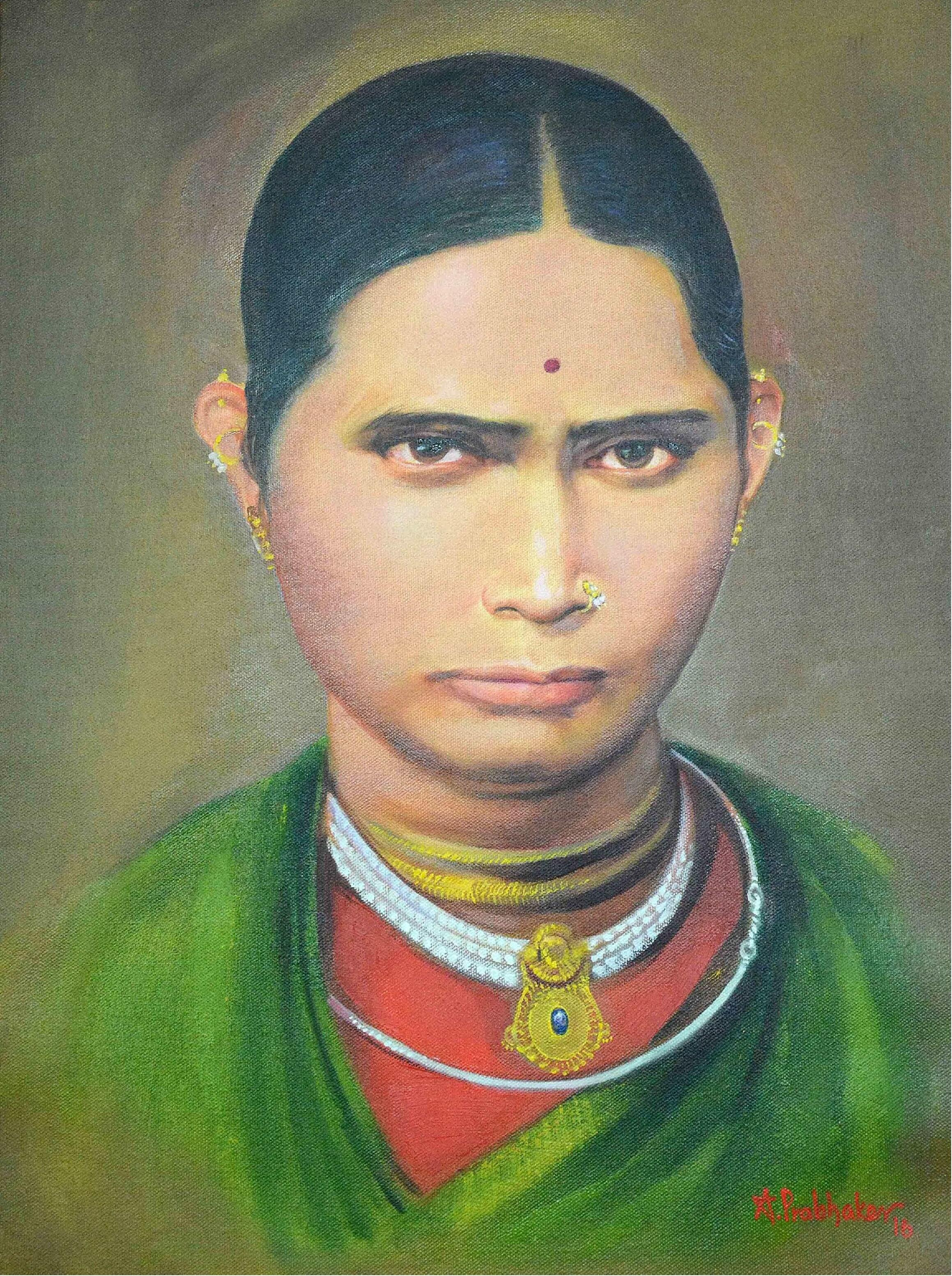
- Born: 1874; Penuganchiprolu
- Died: 1905 (aged 30–31)
- Occupations: Activist, Feminist historian

Bhandaru Acchamamba (1874 – 1905) was one of the pioneers in the early stages of women's movement. She is regarded as one of the early feminist historians in India. Acchamamba studied Telugu, English and Hindi classics under her brother's guidance and became knowledgeable in literature and women's issues. She wrote several biographies of Telugu and British women, which laid path for future historians. Her stories reflect the social conditions of her times and women's issues.

== Early life and background ==
Bhandaru Acchamamba was born in 1874 in a small village called Penuganchiprolu in Krishna district of Andhra Pradesh. Her father, who was a diwan (minister in the state government), died when she was six years old. She was married to her maternal uncle, Bhandaru Madhava Rao at the age of ten and started family life with him at the age of seventeen. Madhava Rao was not favorable to her learning. However, after her father died, she took her younger brother, Komarraju Venkata Lakshmana Rao under her care and she learned to read Telugu, Hindi, English and Marathi, sitting next her brother. After her brother left for Nagpur to continue his studies, Acchamamba worked on her own, learning Bengali and Gujarati as well as a little Sanskrit.

The early deaths of her son and daughter were inconsolable personal loss for her. Since then Acchamamba had adopted five orphans providing them with basic necessities and education.

Together with Oruganti Sundari Ratnamamba, Acchamamba established the first women's association in Coastal Andhra called Brindavana Streela Samaajam (Brindavana Women's Association) at Machilipatnam in the year 1902. In 1903, she traveled all over the state and helped others to establish several women's organizations.

Acchamamba died on 18 January 1905, at the age of 30.

== Literary work ==
Acchamamba wrote several short stories, essays on women's issues. Her most popular writing was a volume of biographies of 34 women, known as Abaala Saccharitra Ratnamala.

The works of Acchamamba include,

- Dhana Trayodasi
- Abaala Saccharitra Ratnamala (A Garland of Great Women's Life Histories)
- Beeda Kutumbam (A Poor Family)
- Khana
- Satakam (A Cycle of Hundred Poems)

Articles published in the magazines Hindu Sundari and Saraswati are,

- Dampatula Prathama Kalahamu (The First Dispute of a Couple)
- Vidyaavantulagu Yuvatulakoka Vinnapamu (An Appeal to the Educated Women)
- Strividyaa Prabhaavam (The Strength of Woman's Education)

Dhana Trayodasi was published in the monthly Hindu Sundari in 1902. It was a story about a poor couple who did not have money to light up little dish lamps for Deepavali celebrations and buy clothes. The crux of the plot was the husband's attempt to commit a crime and the wife curbing his ill-advised plan.

In 1901, with the help of her brother, Acchamamba compiled several stories on Indian women and published them into the book Abaala Saccharitra Ratnamala. These inspirational stories depicted the beauty, bravery and conviction of 34 Indian women, belonging to a period of 1000 years, through their biographies. Excerpts of this book were published in Kandukuri Veeresalingam's socio-economic journal Chintamani.

In her story Khana, Acchamamba retrieves the life of Khana, the wife of the famous Indian astronomer and mathematician Varaha Mihira, who acquired great proficiency in poetry, astrology and astronomy.

She traveled extensively and spoke with several scholars.

== Sources ==
- Satyavati, Kondaveeti. (Bhandaru Acchamamba. First Telugu Story writer. Article).
- Tharu, Susie and Lalita K. Eds. Women's Writing in India. Volume 2 The Twentieth Century.(1993). The Feminist Press.
- Malathi, Nidadavolu. (Bhandaru Acchamamba. Outstanding life and work of Bhandaru Acchamamba.
