= Charles Philip Brown =

British official of the East India Company (1798–1884)

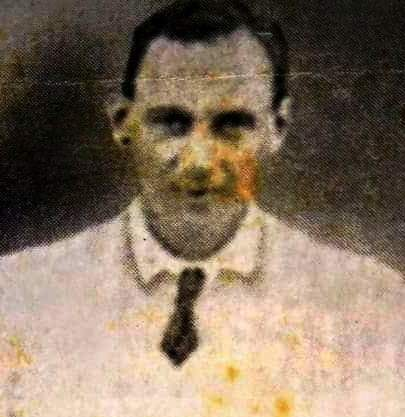
- Undated newspaper image of Brown
- Born: 10 November 1798; Calcutta, British India
- Died: 12 December 1884 (aged 86); London
- Education: Indian Civil Service
- Occupation: Civil servant
- Writing career
- Notable work: Telugu dictionary
- Movement: Collection of Telugu books

Charles Philip Brown (10 November 1798 – 12 December 1884) was a British official of the East India Company. He worked in what is now Andhra Pradesh, and became an important scholarly figure in Telugu language literature.

== Background ==
Telugu literature was in a dormant phase in the 18th century, for a number of social and political reasons - a lack of creative Telugu poets, prevailing illiteracy and the decline of the Vijayanagara Empire as patrons of Telugu literature. Brown, as official in the region, collected and edited works. He believed he had saved the heritage of the Telugu language. In his own words,

"Telugu literature was dying out; the flame was flickering in the socket. In 1825, I found Telugu literature dead. In 30 years I raised it to life".

Janamaddi Hanumath Sastri, who has researched Brown's life, established a library in Kadapa in his memory.

== Biography ==
Charles Brown was born in Calcutta on 10 November 1798. His father David Brown was a manager of an orphanage and a missionary and scholar in many languages including Sanskrit. Charles Brown moved back to England in 1812 after his father's death, to obtain training from Haileybury College for a civil service position in India. He returned to Madras on 4 August 1817

In 1820, Thomas Munro, governor of Madras had ordered that every official should learn a local language. Brown chose Telugu, under the guidance of Velagapudi Kodandarama Panthulu, and passed a Telugu examination as well as the civil service examination that year. He became deputy to John Hanbury, the collector of Kadapa. Hanbury was fluent in Telugu and Brown continued to study. He was transferred to Machilipatnam in 1822 and then to Rajahmundry in 1825. Moved to Guntur at the beginning of the famine of 1832–3, he employed active methods, while dealing with sceptical superiors in Madras.

Brown was relieved from his duties in 1834. He went back to London and stayed there from 1835 to 1838. Brown returned to Madras again in 1837 as a translator of Persian for the East India Company and joined as a member of the Madras College Board. He retired in 1854 because of health reasons and went back to London again. He worked at London University as Telugu Professor for some time.

== Legacy ==
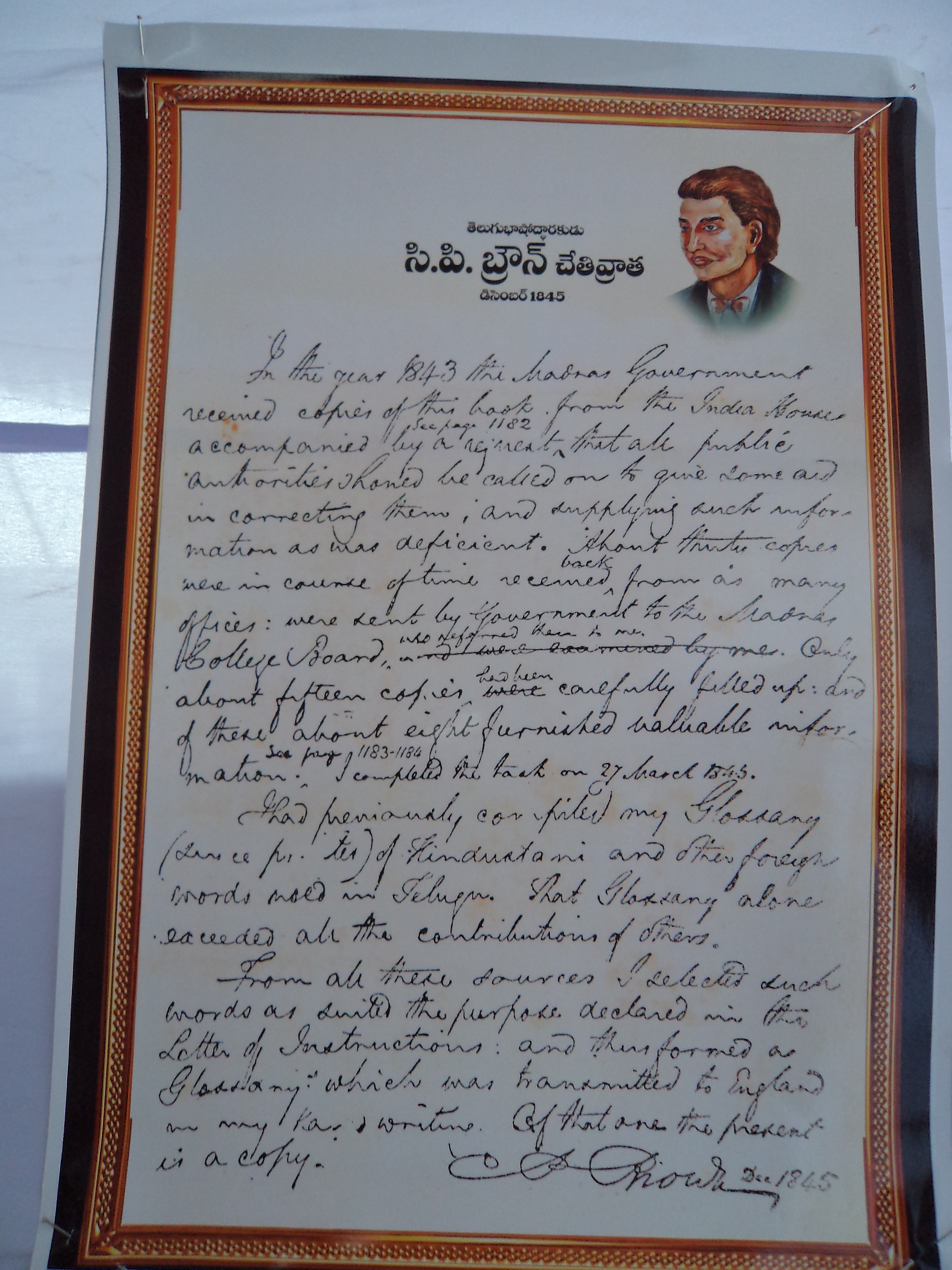
CP Brown's Handwriting

While Brown concentrated on Telugu, he was a polyglot. Other languages Brown is said to have known were Greek, Latin, Persian and Sanskrit. He supported Telugu in three ways - he produced his own works, he recovered and discovered old works and he printed books in Telugu. He financed himself and sometimes borrowed to do so. He established two free schools in Cuddapah and two more in Machilipattanam.

Brown's interests turned to Vemana's writings in 1824. He studied Telugu meter and grammar under the guidance of Venkatasivasastri Tippabhatla and Advaitabrahmasastri Vatthyam. He continued his study of Telugu literature in Rajahmundry from 1825. He collected rare manuscripts of Telugu kavyas (poems) and had them copied. He also collected essays, stories, and poems that existed as an oral literature. During his stay in London from 1835, he was employed by Horace Hayman Wilson in cataloguing South Indian language manuscripts from the East India House Library. Ultimately, many of those were sent back to Madras. Friedrich August Rosen encouraged his work on Telugu prosody, and had Brown's essay on it published in the Asiatic Journal. There, Brown advocated a more incisive approach, less reliant on Indian traditions, and levelled some criticisms at the old school of Henry Colebrooke, Sir William Jones and William Yates. He published in the Madras Journal of Literature and Science, on Colin Mackenzie's manuscript collection from 1838 to 1848.

=== Works ===
Brown wrote:

- A Dictionary, Telugu and English, (Telugu: బ్రౌణ్య నిఘంటువు Brownya Nighantuvu) explaining the Colloquial Style used in Business, and the Poetical Dialect, with Explanations in English and in Telugu; explaining the English Idioms and Phrases in Telugu. with the Pronunciation of English Words. With a Dictionary of Mixed Telugu, also an Explanation of the Telugu Alphabet. By Charles Philip Brown. Three vols. Madras, 1852–54.
- A Grammar of the Telugu Language, By Charles Philip Brown, Second Edition, much enlarged and improved, Madras, 1857.
- A Dictionary of the Mixed Dialects and Foreign Words used in Telugu; with an Explanation of the Telugu Alphabet By C. P. Brown, Madras, 1854.
- The Telugu Reader, being a series of Letters, Private and on Business, Police and Revenue Matters, with an English Translation, Notes explaining the Grammar, and a little Lexicon. By Charles Philip Brown. Three Parts. Madras, 1852.
- A Little Lexicon, explaining such Words as occur in the first three Chapters of the Telugu Reader, and in the Telugu Dialogues. By C. P. Brown. Madras, 1862.
- Dialogues in Telugu and English, with a Grammatical Analysis. By C. P. Brown. Second Edition. Madras, 1853.
- The Zillah Dictionary, in the Roman Character; explaining the various Words used in Business in India. By C. P. Brown, Madras, 1852.
- Disputations on Village Business; the Original Telugu Record. Edited by C. P. Brown. Madras, 1855.
- Andhra Geervana Chandamu (ఆంధ్ర గీర్వాణ చందము) (Prosody of Telugu and Sanskrit), College Press, Madras in 1827.
- Vemana Satakam (వేమన శతకము) (verses of Vemana): Collection of 693 poems by Vemana along with English Translation and glossary in 1829.
- Lokam Cheta Vrayabadina Subha Vartamanamu (లోకం చేత వ్రాయబడిన శుభ వర్తమానము), translation of bible stories in Telugu.
- The Wars of the Rajas or Rajula Yuddhamulu (రాజుల యుద్ధములు), being the History of Anantapur. Written in Telugu; in or about the year 1750–1810. Translated into English by Charles Philip Brown. Madras, 1853.
- Brown's grammar book of Telugu in 1840
- Telugu to English and English to Telugu dictionaries (తెలుగు-ఆంగ్ల నిఘంటువు, ఆంగ్ల-తెలుగు నిఘంటువు) in 1852 and 1854.
- Vemana Satakam (వేమన శతకము) (verses of Vemana): Second collection of 1164 poems by Vemana along with English Translation and glossary in 1839.

=== Other publishings ===
He had prepared commentaries for all of the published works so that non-scholars can understand them. Some of the publishings sponsored by him are:

- Tale of Nala by Raghava in 1841.
- The Calamities of Harischandra by Gaurana Mantri in 1842.
- Nannaya's Andhra Mahabharatam in 1843
- Ramarajabhushanudu's Vasu Charitra in 1844
- Peddana's Manu Charitra in 1851.
- Potana's Andhra Mahabhagavatam in 1848 along with Puranam Hayagreeva Sastry.
- Tikkana's Andhra Mahabharatam in 1848 along with Puvvada Venkata Rao.
- Srinatha's Palanadu Veera Charitra in 1852.

He also left many press ready copies like Basavapurana, PanDitaaraadhya Charitra, Ranganaatha Ramayanam, Uttara Raamaayanam, Vijaya Vilasam, Sarangadhara Charitra, Hari Vamsam, Kasi Khandam, Aniruddha Charitra, Kuchelopakhyaanam, Radhika Santvanam, Vikramaarka charitra etc. They were published by different institutions in Tamil Nadu and Andhra Pradesh after his death.

He also collected poems of Sumathi Satakam and Andhra Pradesh Sahitya Academy published it in 1973 acknowledging him. This is similar to Vemana Satakam that Brown published.

=== Style ===
He collected the stories and poems of common people and published them first. Though he was less interested in pedantic works, he also published many major Telugu works along with translations written by him or other copiers closely monitored by him. He prepared an index, a glossary and commentaries to all the works. Brown mentioned that the purpose of the commentary was to make the poems to be understood clearly without oral instructions. He also included many spoken words in his dictionary.

There is no concrete evidence that Brown introduced any more than Sandhi breaks for the Telugu alphabet. The 1906 Linguistics Survey of India does not credit Brown for change in alphabets or making it easy for pronunciation.

=== Death ===
He died on 12 December 1884 at the age of eighty-seven. He is buried in Kensal Green Cemetery (The General Cemetery of All Souls) in London.

== Awards and titles ==
- He is respected as Andhrabhashoddhaaraka, saviour of Telugu.
- A library building was constructed at Cuddapah on the site of Brown's Bungalow known in those days as Brown's College.

== See also ==
- Vemana
- Tyāgarāja
- Arthur Cotton, another beloved westerner by Telugu people, a civil engineer.
- Daniel Negers, a French national who fell in love with Telugu culture.
- Tenali Ramakrishna
- Potana
