= Andhra Vignanamu =

General knowledge encyclopedia in Telugu (1938–1941)

Sri Andhra Vignanamu శ్రీ ఆంధ్ర విజ్ఞానము
- Editor: Kandukuri Bala Surya Prasada Rao (Kandukuri Prasada Bhupaludu)
- Language: Telugu
- Subject: General
- Genre: Reference encyclopedia
- Publication date: 1938–1941
- Publication place: India
- Media type: 7 volumes
- Pages: 3,708

Sri Andhra Vignanamu was a Telugu-language general knowledge encyclopedia, published in seven volumes between 1938 and 1941 from Kakinada and Rajahmundry. Edited by Kandukuri Bala Surya Prasada Rao (Prasada Bhupaludu), the zamindar of Devidi Estate, the work is recognized as the first fully completed encyclopedia in Telugu. It compiles extensive knowledge across various disciplines, with articles arranged alphabetically and supplemented by a separate volume published in 1941.

Though preceded by Andhra Vignana Sarvasvam, an incomplete encyclopedia initiated by Komarraju Venkata Lakshmana Rao in 1912, Andhra Vignanamu holds the distinction of being the first Telugu encyclopedia to achieve completion.

== Contributors ==
Kandukuri Bala Surya Prasada Rao, also known as Prasada Bhupaludu, the zamindar of Devidi Estate in Ganjam district, compiled the articles from various scholars and put them in his own language. Apart from being a compiler and editor, he was also a writer of the encyclopedia.

== Content ==
The articles in the encyclopedia were arranged alphabetically according to the Telugu alphabet. A supplement to the encyclopedia, consisting of 184 pages, was published in 1941 to further expand its scope. The preface to the encyclopedia was written by the renowned scholar Cattamanchi Ramalinga Reddy, who praised Prasada Rao for his editorial skills and intellectual contributions.

The encyclopedia encompassed a wide range of topics, with particular emphasis on ancient Indian thought. While primarily written in Telugu, some articles on modern scientific subjects were published in English, which limited its accessibility for Telugu readers. Despite this limitation, Andhra Vignanamu is recognized for its scholarly rigour and comprehensive coverage.

== Volumes ==
Publication year	Volume number
1938	I
1938	II
1939	III
1940	IV
1941	V
1941	VI
1941	VII
1941	Supplement

== Reception ==
Encyclopaedia of Indian Literature reviewed it noting, "Though it is a one man effort and has all the drawbacks associated with it, and the selection as well the treatment of the entries is more arbitrary than logical, the volumes are, no doubt, serving its designed purpose."

M. Sankara Reddy lists Andhra Vignanamu in his book on Telugu reference sources. C. Dwarakanath Gupta cited it for information on Vysya gotras in his book Socio-cultural History of an Indian Caste.
