= Ontari (caste) =

- Classification: Forward caste
- Religions: Hinduism
- Languages: Telugu
- Country: India
- Populated states: Andhra Pradesh
- Region: South India

Ontari / Vantara / Vantari is a community living in the Indian state of Andhra Pradesh. Ontari is a subcaste of the Kapu community.

== Etymology ==
Ontari literally means 'the lone one' which referred to their bravery in the context of historical warfare. Ontaris, also known as Ekkatis, took part in hand-to-hand fight called Ekkati Kayyamu, the combat of singles. Ontari forces served as the reserve army, and each fighter in this division was probably a great wrestler and also wielded heavy weapons like maces and the like. The Ekkatis of the Reddi period gradually formed into a separate military caste or community, and are now popularly called Vantarlu. These now form one of the three sections of the Telaga community, the other two being the Telaga (proper), and the Kapu. As per K. S. Singh, "The title Ontari was awarded to them during the time of Sri Krishnadevaraya in the sixteenth century as a reward for their bravery in warfare. Prior to this, they were only known as Telaga. They received rent-free lands for their services as warriors. During the colonial era, Ontaris were recorded as people who valued honour over their lives. They were known to carry daggers on their waists at all times. Ontari women previously observed gosha. Ontaris in Parlakimidi (Orissa), Bobbili, Pitapuram were referred to as Dora (lord or master).

== Occupation ==
Historically, Ontaris were exclusively into military service. In the present day, Ontaris are landholding agriculturists.

== Status ==
Ontaris are classified as a forward caste in Andhrapradesh.
