= Janamaddi Hanumath Sastri =

Indian writer and linguist

- జానమద్ది హనుమచ్ఛాస్త్రి
- Born: 1926; Rayadurgam, Anantapur district, Andhra Pradesh, India
- Died: 28 February 2014 (aged 87–88)
- Occupation: Writer
- Parents: Subbanna (father); Janakamma (mother)

Dr. Janamaddi Hanumath Sastri (1926–2014) was an Indian writer and linguist from Kadapa, Andhra Pradesh. He wrote several books in Telugu and English. He served the Kadapa writers' organisation for four decades and established C. P. Brown Memorial Library there. Jnanpith Award winner C. Narayana Reddy used to fondly call him Brown Sastri for his extensive research on Brown.

He was born in Rayadurgam, Anantapur district in 1926 to the couple Subbanna, Janakamma. He worked as a teacher in 1946 at Government Secondary Grade School, Bellary.

== Writings ==
Sastri wrote over 2,500 articles in various newspapers and publications and authored 16 books. Notable works include life histories of C P Brown, Mokshagundam Visvesvaraya, Bellary Raghava.

== Awards ==
- Ayyanki Vekataramanaiah Award
- Anantapur Lalita Kala Parishat Award
- Dharmavaram Kalajyoti Sirisi Anjaneyulu Award
- Kadapa Savera Arts Sahiti Prapurna Award
- Madanapalli Bharatamuni Kalaratna Award
- Telugu University Pratibha Puraskaram
- Bangalore Akhila Bharata Grandhalaya Mahasabha Puraskaram
- Lok Nayak Foundation Literary Award
