= List of speakers of the Andhra Pradesh Legislative Assembly =

Presiding officer of the lower house of the Andhra Pradesh Legislature of India

Speaker of the Andhra Pradesh Legislative Assembly
- Āndhra Pradēś Śāsanasabha Sabhāpati
- Emblem of Andhra Pradesh

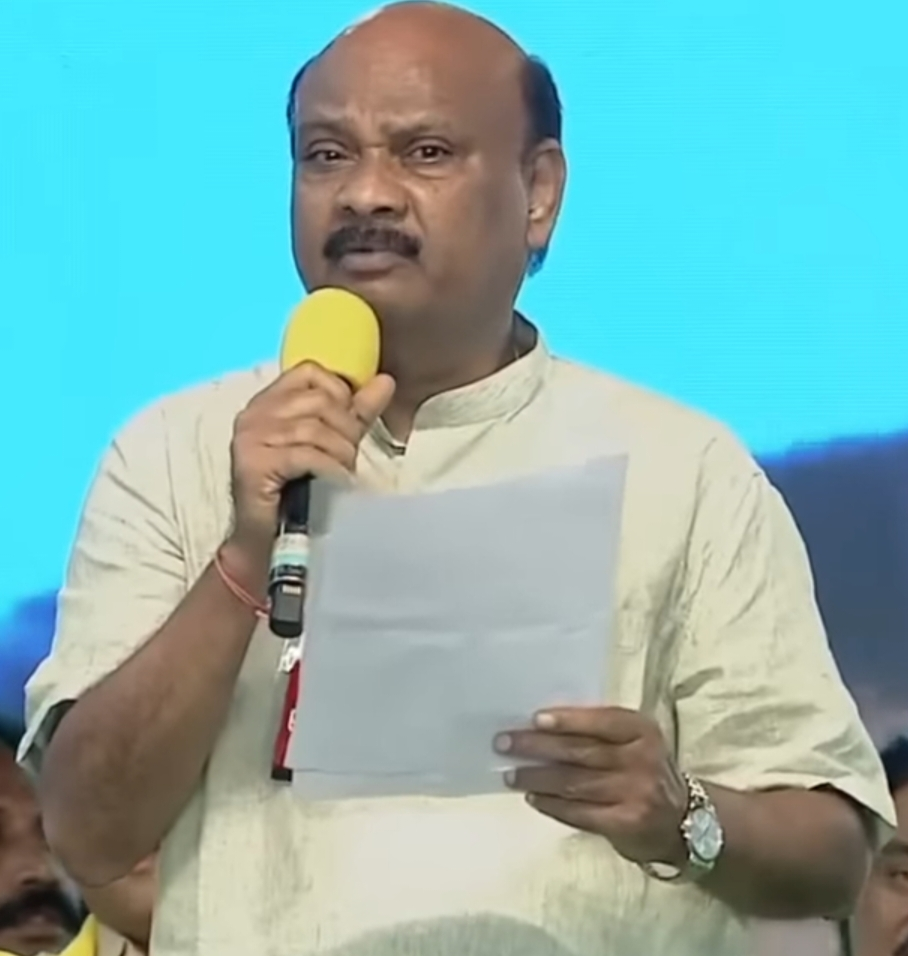
- Incumbent; Chintakayala Ayyanna Patrudu since 22 June 2024
- Andhra Pradesh Legislative Assembly
- Style: Honourable (Inside India); His/Her Excellency (Outside India)
- Status: Presiding officer of the Andhra Pradesh Legislative Assembly; Cabinet Rank Post
- Member of: Andhra Pradesh Legislative Assembly
- Reports to: Andhra Pradesh Legislative Assembly
- Seat: Velagapudi, Amaravati, Guntur district, Andhra Pradesh
- Appointer: All members of the Andhra Pradesh Legislative Assembly
- Term length: Subject to the pleasure of the Legislative Assembly (five years maximum) No term limits specified
- Constituting instrument: Article 178 of the Constitution of India
- Inaugural holder: Ayyadevara Kaleswara Rao
- Formation: 1953; 72–73 years ago
- Deputy: Raghu Rama Krishna Raju
- Website: Official website

The speaker of the Andhra Pradesh Legislative Assembly is the presiding officer of the Andhra Pradesh Legislative Assembly, the main law-making body for the Indian state of Andhra Pradesh. The Speaker of the Legislative Assembly is generally elected on the second day of the first session following general elections. The speaker does not enjoy a security of tenure and his term is subjected to the pleasure of the house i.e. can be removed anytime by a resolution of the Legislative Assembly by a majority of the all the then members of the house. B. V. Subba Reddy, the longest-serving Speaker of the Andhra Pradesh Legislative Assembly, held the position for 9 years and 195 days. Notably, he was unanimously elected as Speaker twice, in 1962 and 1967, serving in both the Third and Fourth Assemblies.

In the Republic of India, the various central and state legislatures are presided by either a speaker or a chairman. The speaker is elected in the very first meeting of the Andhra Pradesh Legislative Assembly after the General elections for a term of 5 years from amongst the members of the Saasana Sabha. The speaker holds office until either they ceases to be a member of the Saasana Sabha or he himself resigns. The speaker can be removed from office by a resolution passed in the Saasana Sabha by an effective majority of its members. In the absence of a Speaker, the meeting of Andhra Pradesh Legislative Assembly is presided over by the deputy speaker.

== Election of the speaker ==
Newly elected Members of Andhra Pradesh Legislative Assembly elect the Speaker among themselves. After the general elections, the Governor of Andhra Pradesh notifies the first meeting of the Lok Sabha as well as the date for the election of the Speaker.

If only one nomination is received for the Speaker of the Legislative Assembly, the candidate is elected without any formal vote. However, if more than one nomination is received, a vote (division) is conducted to determine the Speaker, with the successful candidate being elected to the position.

== Powers and functions of the speaker ==
The Speaker of the Legislative Assembly conducts the business in house, and decides whether a bill is a money bill or not. They maintain discipline and decorum in the house and can punish a member for unruly behaviour with respect to law after suspending them. They also permit the moving of various kinds of motions and resolutions such as a motion of no confidence, motion of adjournment, motion of censure and calling attention notice as per the rules. The Speaker decides on the agenda to be taken up for discussion during the meeting. Further, all comments and speeches made by members of the House are addressed to the Speaker. The Speaker also presides over the joint sitting of both houses of the Andhra Pradesh Legislature. The Speaker is answerable to the House. Both the Speaker and Deputy Speaker may be removed by a resolution passed by the majority of the members.

All bills passed requires the speaker's signature to go to the Legislative Council for its consideration. The Speaker also has a casting vote in the event of a tie. It is customary for the Presiding Officer to exercise the casting vote in such a manner as to maintain the status quo.

== Removal of the speaker ==
Speaker can be removed by the Legislative Assembly by a resolution passed by the majority of all the then members of the house as per Constitution of India [Articles 179].

The Speaker is also removed on being disqualified for being Andhra Pradesh Legislative Assembly member under sections 7 and 8 of Representation of the People Act, 1951.

== List of speakers ==
=== 1953–1956 ===
S. No.	Speaker	Took office	Left office	Duration	DY Speaker	Took office	Left office	Duration	Chief minister
1	Nallapati Venkatramaiah	23 November 1953	21 April 1955	1 year, 149 days	Pasala Suryachandra Rao	24 November 1953	15 November 1954	356 days	Tanguturi Prakasam
1	Nallapati Venkatramaiah	23 November 1953	21 April 1955	1 year, 149 days	Pasala Suryachandra Rao	24 November 1953	15 November 1954	356 days	Bezawada Gopala Reddy
2	Rokkam Lakshmi Narasimham Dora	23 April 1955	3 December 1956	1 year, 224 days	Kallur Subba Rao	27 April 1955	30 October 1956	1 year, 186 days	Bezawada Gopala Reddy

=== Since 1956 ===
#	Name (Birth-Death)	Took office	Left office	Duration	DY Speaker	Took office	Left office	Duration	Party	Chief minister
1	Ayyadevara Kaleswara Rao (1881-1962)	4 December 1956	26 February 1962	5 years, 84 days	Kalluru Subba Rao	1 November 1956	15 April 1957	165 days	Indian National Congress	Neelam Sanjiva Reddy
1	Ayyadevara Kaleswara Rao (1881-1962)	4 December 1956	26 February 1962	5 years, 84 days	Konda Laxman Bapuji	16 April 1957	11 January 1960	2 years, 270 days	Indian National Congress	Neelam Sanjiva Reddy
1	Ayyadevara Kaleswara Rao (1881-1962)	4 December 1956	26 February 1962	5 years, 84 days	T. N. Sadalakshmi	15 March 1960	1 March 1962	1 year, 351 days	Indian National Congress	Damodaram Sanjivayya
2	B. V. Subba Reddy (1903–1974)	20 March 1962	29 September 1971	9 years, 193 days	Vasudev Krishnaji Naik	7 July 1962	28 February 1967	4 years, 236 days	Indian National Congress	Neelam Sanjiva Reddy
2	B. V. Subba Reddy (1903–1974)	20 March 1962	29 September 1971	9 years, 193 days	Vasudev Krishnaji Naik	29 March 1967	1 March 1972	4 years, 338 days	Indian National Congress	Kasu Brahmananda Reddy
3	K. V. Vema Reddy	25 November 1971	19 March 1972	115 days	Vasudev Krishnaji Naik	29 March 1967	1 March 1972	4 years, 338 days	Indian National Congress	P. V. Narasimha Rao
4	Pidatala Ranga Reddy	21 March 1972	25 September 1974	2 years, 188 days	C. Jagannadha Rao	28 March 1972	18 March 1974	1 year, 355 days	Indian National Congress	P. V. Narasimha Rao
4	Pidatala Ranga Reddy	21 March 1972	25 September 1974	2 years, 188 days	C. Jagannadha Rao	28 March 1972	18 March 1974	1 year, 355 days	Indian National Congress	Jalagam Vengala Rao
5	R. Dasaratha Rami Reddy	28 January 1975	14 March 1978	3 years, 45 days	Syed Rahmat Ali	26 March 1974	1 March 1978	3 years, 340 days	Indian National Congress	Jalagam Vengala Rao
5	R. Dasaratha Rami Reddy	28 January 1975	14 March 1978	3 years, 45 days	Syed Rahmat Ali	26 March 1974	1 March 1978	3 years, 340 days	Indian National Congress	Marri Chenna Reddy
6	Divi Kondaiah Chowdary	16 March 1978	16 October 1980	2 years, 214 days	K. Prabhakara Reddy	28 March 1978	16 October 1980	2 years, 202 days	Indian National Congress	Marri Chenna Reddy
6	Divi Kondaiah Chowdary	16 March 1978	16 October 1980	2 years, 214 days	K. Prabhakara Reddy	28 March 1978	16 October 1980	2 years, 202 days	Indian National Congress	T. Anjaiah
7	Kona Prabhakara Rao	24 February 1981	22 September 1981	210 days	Agarala Eswara Reddi	24 February 1981	22 September 1981	210 days	Indian National Congress	T. Anjaiah
8	Agarala Eswara Reddi	7 September 1982	16 January 1983	131 days	Ireni Lingaiah	7 September 1982	16 January 1983	131 days	Indian National Congress	Bhavanam Venkatarami Reddy
8	Agarala Eswara Reddi	7 September 1982	16 January 1983	131 days	Ireni Lingaiah	7 September 1982	16 January 1983	131 days	Indian National Congress	Kotla Vijaya Bhaskara Reddy
9	Tangi Satyanarayana	18 January 1983	28 August 1984	1 year, 223 days	A. Bheem Reddy	22 March 1983	28 Aug 1984	1 year, 159 days	Telugu Desam Party	N. T. Rama Rao
10	Nissanakararao Venkatratnam	20 September 1984	10 January 1985	112 days	Vacant				Telugu Desam Party	N. T. Rama Rao
11	G. Narayana Rao	12 March 1985	27 October 1989	4 years, 229 days	Alluri Venkata Suryanarayana Raju	12 March 1985	29 November 1989	4 years, 262 days	Telugu Desam Party	N. T. Rama Rao
12	P. Ramachandra Reddy	4 January 1990	22 December 1990	265 days	Alapati Dharma Rao	4 January 1990	22 December 1990	265 days	Indian National Congress	Marri Chenna Reddy
13	D. Sripada Rao	19 August 1991	11 January 1995	3 years, 155 days	Alapati Dharma Rao	19 August 1991	28 September 1992	1 year, 50 days	Indian National Congress	N. Janardhana Reddy
13	D. Sripada Rao	19 August 1991	11 January 1995	3 years, 155 days	Buragadda Vedavyas	29 December 1993	10 December 1994	346 days	Indian National Congress	Kotla Vijaya Bhaskara Reddy
14	Yanamala Rama Krishnudu	12 January 1995	10 October 1999	4 years, 271 days	N. Md. Farooq	17 January 1995	09 October 1999	4 years, 265 days	Telugu Desam Party	N. T. Rama Rao
14	Yanamala Rama Krishnudu	12 January 1995	10 October 1999	4 years, 271 days	N. Md. Farooq	17 January 1995	09 October 1999	4 years, 265 days	Telugu Desam Party	N. Chandrababu Naidu
15	K. Prathibha Bharathi	11 November 1999	30 May 2004	4 years, 201 days	K. Chandrashekar Rao	11 November 1999	1 May 2001	1 year, 171 days	Telugu Desam Party	N. Chandrababu Naidu
15	K. Prathibha Bharathi	11 November 1999	30 May 2004	4 years, 201 days	Koppula Harishwar Reddy	31 December 2001	14 November 2003	1 year, 318 days	Telugu Desam Party	N. Chandrababu Naidu
16	K. R. Suresh Reddy	1 June 2004	3 June 2009	5 years, 2 days	Gummadi Kuthuhalamma	1 June 2007	3 June 2009	2 years, 2 days	Indian National Congress	Y. S. Rajasekhara Reddy
17	Kiran Kumar Reddy	4 June 2009	24 November 2010	1 year, 173 days	Nadendla Manohar	4 June 2009	3 June 2011	1 year, 364 days	Indian National Congress	Y. S. Rajasekhara Reddy
17	Kiran Kumar Reddy	4 June 2009	24 November 2010	1 year, 173 days	Nadendla Manohar	4 June 2009	3 June 2011	1 year, 364 days	Indian National Congress	Konijeti Rosaiah
18	Nadendla Manohar	4 June 2011	18 June 2014	3 years, 14 days	Mallu Bhatti Vikramarka	4 June 2011	20 May 2014	2 years, 350 days	Indian National Congress	Kiran Kumar Reddy
19	Kodela Siva Prasada Rao	20 June 2014	12 June 2019	4 years, 357 days	Mandali Buddha Prasad	20 June 2014	21 June 2024	5 years, 8 days	Telugu Desam Party	N. Chandrababu Naidu
20	Thammineni Seetharam	13 June 2019	21 June 2024	5 years, 8 days	Kona Raghupathi	13 June 2019	18 September 2022	3 years, 97 days	YSR Congress Party	Y. S. Jagan Mohan Reddy
20	Thammineni Seetharam	13 June 2019	21 June 2024	5 years, 8 days	Kolagatla Veerabhadra Swamy	19 September 2022	21 June 2024	1 year, 276 days	YSR Congress Party	Y. S. Jagan Mohan Reddy
21	Chintakayala Ayyanna Patrudu	22 June 2024	Incumbent	2 years, 77 days	Raghu Rama Krishna Raju	14 November 2024	Incumbent	1 year, 297 days	Telugu Desam Party	N. Chandrababu Naidu

== Pro tem Speaker ==
After a general election and the formation of a new government, a list of senior Members in Vidhan Sabha prepared by the Legislative Section is submitted to the Minister of Parliamentary Affairs, who selects a pro tem speaker who holds the office of Speaker until a full time speaker is elected. The appointment has to be approved by the Governor.

The first meeting after the election when the speaker and the deputy speaker are selected by members of the Vidhan Sabha is held under the pro tem Speaker. In the absence of the speaker, the deputy speaker acts as speaker. In the absence of both, a committee of six members selected by the speaker will act as speaker according to their seniority.

The Speaker of the Assembly must:

- Be a citizen of India;
- Not be less than 25 years of age; and
- Not hold any office of profit under the Government of Andhra Pradesh, India.

=== List of Pro tem Speakers ===
- Pathivada Narayanaswamy Naidu 2014
- S. V. China Appala Naidu 2019
- Gorantla Butchaiah Chowdary 2024
