= Mudiraju =

Indian caste

The Mudiraju or Mudiraj and Mutrasi, earlier recorded as Mutracha, is a caste found in Andhra Pradesh and Telangana. It is categorised among the Other Backward Classes by the Government of India.

== Titles ==
- Mannewad, The Mudirajus who were engaged as village guard under the title of Mannewad.
- Bantu, The Mudirajus of South India served as soldiers under several princely states and rajas and received the title of Bantu by rulers.
- Cherish, The Mudirajus who served in ancient kingdoms and empires in India were honoured with the title of Cherish.

== Classification ==
Mudiraj caste is categorised among the Other Backward Classes by the Government of India.

== See also ==
- Muthuraja
