= Pagolu =

Coordinates: 16°6′30″N 80°54′52″E

- Village
- Interactive map of Pagolu
- Location in Andhra Pradesh, India
- Country: India
- State: Andhra Pradesh
- District: Krishna

Area
  - Total: 7.26 km^{2} (2.80 sq mi)

Population (2011)
  - Total: 2,950
  - Density: 406/km^{2} (1,050/sq mi)

Languages
  - Official: Telugu
- Time zone: UTC+5:30 (IST)
- Nearest city: Challapalli(Town)
- Lok Sabha constituency: Machilipatnam
- Vidhan Sabha constituency: Avanigadda

Pagolu is a village in Krishna district of the Indian state of Andhra Pradesh. It is located in Challapalli mandal of Machilipatnam revenue division. It is one of the villages in the mandal to be a part of Andhra Pradesh Capital Region.
