= Turpu Kapu =

Hindu caste of Andhra Pradesh, India

- Classification: Other Backward Classes (OBC)
- Religions: Hinduism
- Languages: Telugu
- Populated states: Andhra Pradesh

Turpu Kapu is an eastern area name of the Kapu caste is an Indian caste in the state of Andhra Pradesh. This caste belongs to the Other Backward Class (OBC) category added by the Government of Andhra Pradesh . They are primarily found in the erstwhile districts of Srikakulam, Vizianagaram and Visakhapatnam with smaller numbers in other regions of the state. Traditionally they were warriors and farmers. They are a politically prominent community in the Uttarandhra region of the state.

The word 'Turpu' means eastern in Telugu, an appellation based on their preponderance in the northeastern region of Andhra (Uttarandhra).
