= Sunkara Balaparameswara Rao =

Indian neurosurgeon (1928–2019)

- Born: 12 February 1928; Bhimavaram, Madras Presidency, British India
- Died: 22 March 2019 (aged 91)
- Education: Andhra Medical College, Visakhapatnam
- Occupation: Neurosurgeon
- Awards: Dr. B. C. Roy Award (1989)

Sunkara Balaparameswara Rao (12 February 1928 – 22 March 2019) was an Indian neurosurgeon. He is regarded as the 'father of neurosurgery in united Andhra Pradesh'. He started the first Department of Neurosurgery in erstwhile Andhra Pradesh in April 1956. He received the Dr. B. C. Roy award in 1989.

== Early life ==
Sunkara Balaparameswara Rao was born on 12 February 1928 in a Kapu family in Bhimavaram, West Godavari district of present-day Andhra Pradesh. He did his early education in Madras, Bhimavaram and Machilipatnam. As a student, he was active in sports and won many laurels a sportsman and a tennis champion.

Balaparameswara Rao was an accidental doctor. He studied an intermediate course in Mathematics, Physics and Chemistry (MPC) stream. However, the postcard intimating his admission into engineering reached a couple of months late, forcing him to take up MBBS as the medical college seat was open to students of the MPC stream at the time. He did his MBBS in 1945-50 and MS in 1954 in General surgery, both from Andhra Medical College, Visakhapatnam.

== Career ==
After graduating from MBBS and MS (General Surgery), Balaparameswara Rao trained in Neurosurgery under B. Ramamurthy in Madras. After his training in Madras, he established the Department of Neurosurgery at the King George Hospital (KGH) and Andhra Medical College (AMC) in April 1956. It is the first Department of Neurosurgery in united Andhra Pradesh. It was the fourth neurosurgery department in India and the first such to be started by a person trained in India. He went to the United Kingdom under the Colombo Plan for a year in 1959. After his return from the UK, he became the Professor of Neurosurgery in 1961. He headed the Neurosurgery department at AMC till 1974.

In March 1974, Balaparameswara Rao left for Hyderabad and headed the neurosurgery departments in the Osmania Medical College and the Nizam's Institute at Hyderabad. Later, he became the Principal of Osmania Medical College and the first Superintendent and architect of what became the Nizam's Institute of Medical Sciences. He was also a Member and later a Fellow of the National Academy of Medical Sciences, New Delhi, and the Senate of Andhra University; and, the Vice President (1973) and later the President (1974) of Neurological Society of India.

Balaparameswara Rao ran free clinics at the St Theresa's Hospital, Hyderabad, from 1983 to 2008. In 2016, he participated in the Diamond Jubilee celebrations of the neurosurgery department of KGH/AMC, which he had established in 1956. Along with his wife, Nagaratnam he was honoured at the Andhra Pradesh Neuro Scientists Association (APNSA) meet in Nellore in 2017 on their 63rd wedding anniversary. He actively practised Neurosurgery even at the age of 90 years. He died on 22 March 2019.

== Personal life ==
Balaparameswara Rao married Nagaratnam in 1955. His grandson Raja Gopal Sunkara was an IAS Officer of Tamil Nadu cadre. Balaparameswara Rao's brother, Sunkara Venkata Adinarayana Rao was an orthopaedic surgeon and a recipient of Padma Shri.

== Awards and honours ==
Balaparameswara Rao was awarded the Dr. B. C. Roy Award for developing neurosurgery in Andhra Pradesh. In 2008, he was conferred an honorary degree of Doctor of Science by the Dr. NTR University of Health Sciences. In 2015, he was awarded Lifetime Achievement award by the Telangana government.

- Ebden Gold Medal for outstanding performance in M.S. (General Surgery).
- Distinguished Scientist award from Andhra Pradesh Academy of Sciences in 1999.
- Dr. B. C. Roy National award in 1989 for organizing and developing Neurosurgery in Andhra Pradesh.
- Lifetime Achievement Award from Golden Jubilee Celebrations committee of Department of Neurosurgery of Andhra Medical College and King George Hospital in 2005.
- Lifetime Achievement Award at Regional Asian Stroke Congress and 1st National Conference of Indian Stroke Association at Chennai on 5 January 2006.
- Honorary Doctorate conferred by NTR University of Health Sciences on 18 February 2008 at Vijayawada.
- Lifetime Achievement Award by International Neuro Spinal Surgeons Association of India at the annual conference at Bengaluru on 9 September 2011.
- Ugadi Puraskaram by the Andhra Pradesh Government in 2012.
- Honorary Doctorate conferred by GITAM University, Visakhapatnam on 15 September 2012.
- Lifetime Achievement Award by Neurological Society of India at 64th Annual Conference at Hyderabad on 17 December 2015.
- Lifetime Achievement Award of Madras Neuro Trust in 2006.
