= Komarraju Venkata Lakshmana Rao =

Indian scholar, writer, and encyclopedist (1877–1923)

- కొమఱ్ఱాజు వెంకట లక్ష్మణరావు
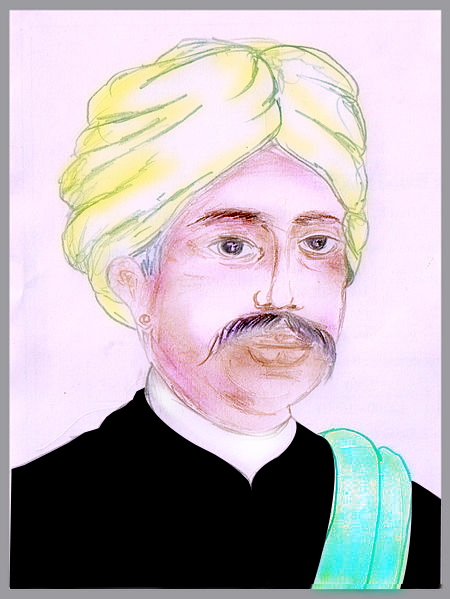
- Born: May 18, 1877; Penuganchiprolu, Krishna district, Andhra Pradesh
- Died: July 14, 1923 (aged 46)
- Occupations: Scholar; Writer; Encyclopedist
- Spouse: Ramakotamma

Komarraju Venkata Lakshmana Rao (18 May 1877 – 14 July 1923) was an Indian scholar, writer, and editor known for his contributions to Telugu literature and historical research. He is best remembered for initiating Andhra Vignana Sarvasvam in 1912–1913, the first modern encyclopedia project in any South Indian language, and for his efforts to foster intellectual discourse in Telugu.

Lakshmana Rao co-founded the publishing house Vignana Chandrika Mandali alongside contemporaries such as Ayyadevara Kaleswara Rao and Gadicherla Harisarvottama Rao. He also served as Diwan to the Zamindar of Munagala before moving to Madras. His also authored Sivaji Charithram, a historical work in Telugu.

== Life ==
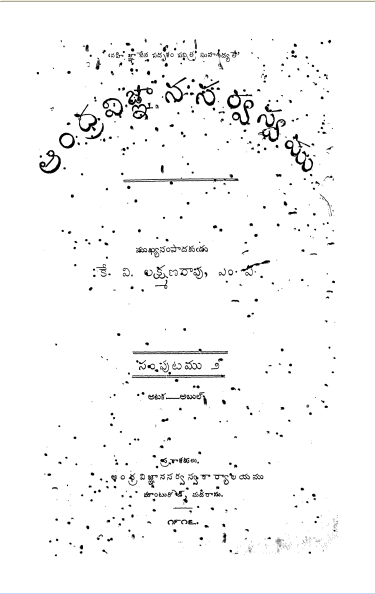
Andhra Vignana Sarvasvam - Vol 2 Cover (First Edition)

He was the son of Komarraju Venkatappaiah and Gangamma on 18 May 1877 in a Brahmin family in Penuganchiprolu village in Krishna district whis is now part of Andhra Pradesh. His father died two years after his birth, leaving one daughter and two sons. His early education was imparted at Bhongir under his mother and step brother Shankar Rao. Later he was shifted to Nagpur for higher education under the care of his older sister, Bhandaru Acchamamba and her husband Bhandaru Madhava Rao. Lakshmana Rao married Ramakotamma in 1897. With his help, Acchamamba became a notable scholar. Lakshmana Rao passed his B.A. examination in 1900 and took his M.A. privately in 1902. His guru was Hari Mahadev Pandit, editor of Vividh Gnyan Vistar. Lakshmana Rao was the assistant editor. He wrote Sivaji Charithram in Telugu here.

He shifted to Andhra in 1902, where he was first appointed as the private secretary to the Nayani Venkata Ranga Rao Bahadur, Zamindar of Munagala and subsequently as the Diwan. Later he moved to Madras.

He was equally proficient in Telugu and Marathi languages, and considered both these languages to be his mother tongues. He knew both the standard Marathi as well as the Southern dialect of Marathi being spoken in Madras Presidency. He has authored many scholarly articles in Marathi as well.

Along with Shyamji Rama Rao, Ayyadevara Kaleswara Rao and Gadicherla Harisarvottama Rao, he started a publication agency, Vignana Chandrika. Hari Sarvothama Rao was appointed editor and Kaleswara Rao, his assistant. Later Lakshmana Rao assumed the duties of the editor.
