= Dominant caste =

Type of caste

A dominant caste is one which preponderates numerically over other castes and also wields preponderant economic and political power. A large and powerful caste group can be more easily dominant if its position in the local caste hierarchy is not too low. The concept of dominant caste was introduced in 1959 by sociologist M. N. Srinivas.

== Characteristics ==
Srinivas asserts that to be a dominant caste, a caste must have the following characteristics:

- It must own a sizeable amount of cultivable land.
- It must be of considerable numerical strength.
- It must enjoy a high place in the local caste hierarchy.

Western education, jobs in administration and political clout and contacts have been considered by subsequent authors to be additional factors of dominance.

== Caste groups considered as dominant caste ==
Several caste groups are considered as dominant caste in several parts of India, depending upon their economic status and political representation in the region. In Bihar, Koeri, Kurmi and Yadav are considered as dominant caste groups, as these middle castes became prime moving force in the post land reforms period by increasing their landholding at the cost of big landlords and dislodging the erstwhile elite groups from political power. In south India, castes like Lingayat and Vokkaliga are considered as dominant castes. Author Alakh Sharma notes that in the post independence India, the upper middle castes of Bihar, which included Koeri, Kurmi and Yadav caste, were the beneficiary of incomplete Green Revolution. This social group cornered the institutional credit and were able to produce much more from their land as compared to the upper caste landholders. The failure of upper caste big peasants and landlords in using their land with productivity led to loss of land by way of selling. Sharma observes that in comparison to other social groups, the dispossession of land from the upper caste happened at a higher rate. This transformation gradually change the economic profile of rural area in states like Bihar. Riding upon the wave of change, the dominant groups from upper middle caste viz. Koeri, Kurmi and Yadav rose to prominence in rural agrarian society. This change in hierarchy in the space of economy also elevated these castes as new political elite of the state, which was followed by defeat and weakening of upper caste controlled Indian National Congress in Bihar. The erstwhile dominant caste in Bihar were Rajput and Bhumihar, who until 1967, dominated the rural landscape. However, due to intense rivalry between them, they lost in political space to the middle castes, the trio of Yadav, Koeri and Kurmi. Later, the upper caste moved to cities in search of more opportunities, leading to a vacuum in the dominant space occupied by them in rural areas in all walks of life. This vacuum was filled by newly prosperous upper middle castes, who gradually took over the dominant space in rural areas. It is believed that the economic and educational development of certain Backward Castes (dubbed as upper middle caste) made them conscious of their rights and numerical superiority, which raised their representation in democratic politics, and by 1967, they emerged as political force in states like Bihar.

In Haryana, Jats emerged as the dominant caste. They were owner of large swathes of land in some of the districts of Haryana, as for example in Rohtak district, nearly sixty percent of agricultural land was owned by Jats. The other caste groups in such region were in relation of service providers with the Jats. By early 1920s, the superiority enjoyed by Brahmins due to their position in ritual hierarchy declined, with elevation of Jats as the most dominant caste groups. After the partition of Gujarat and Maharashtra, Marathas emerged as a dominant caste in Maharashtra. The rise of Marathas to prominence had its roots in British economic policy. In the pre-independence India, the introduction of cash crops, specially cotton and sugarcane changed the economic profile of villages. The Marathas, being primarily an agrarian caste-cluster, controlled the production of both these cash crops. They were also involved in Anti-Brahmin movement to defy the ritual hierarchy imposed upon them by sacerdotal authorities. This ensued their emergence as the dominant caste in Maharashtra.
