= S. V. Adinarayana Rao =

Indian orthopaedic surgeon (1939–2026)

- Born: 30 June 1939; Bhimavaram, Madras Province, British India
- Died: 17 January 2026 (aged 86); Visakhapatnam, Andhra Pradesh, India
- Education: Andhra Medical College, Visakhapatnam
- Occupation: Orthopaedic surgeon
- Awards: Padma Shri (2022)

Sunkara Venkata Adinarayana Rao (30 June 1939 – 17 January 2026) was an Indian orthopaedic surgeon noted for his work for the poor and needy. He was the Director-General of the Prema Group of hospitals and institutions. In 2022, he received India's fourth-highest civilian award, Padma Shri by the Government of India for serving poor polio patients with distinction.

== Background ==
Adinarayana Rao was born on 30 June 1939 in Bhimavaram, Madras Province (now Andhra Pradesh) to independence activists Kanakam and Seshamma. His father was a lawyer and also served as the Sarpanch of Bhimavaram. Adinarayana Rao was the third one among four sons. He did his schooling from ULCM High School, Bhimavaram. He completed his M.B.B.S. degree in 1966 and master's degree in Orthopaedic Surgery from Andhra Medical College, Visakhapatnam in 1970. He trained in Germany in Microvascular surgery and Hand surgery. Adinarayana Rao was married to R. Sasiprabha, former superintendent of the King George Hospital. His elder brother, Sunkara Balaparameswara Rao was a neurosurgeon. Adinarayana Rao was a football enthusiast and was president of the Visakhapatnam district football association for more than three decades. He died on 17 January 2026, at the age of 86.

== Career ==
After returning from Germany, Adinarayana Rao started his medical practice in Visakhapatnam. He worked at Andhra Medical College as a tutor and later a professor. He also worked at King George Hospital as a Civil Surgeon. After retiring as Superintendent of the Rani Chandramani Devi Hospital, Adinarayana Rao along with a few other friends set up the Prema Hospital at Ramnagar. He was until his death the Director-General of the Prema Group of Hospitals and Institutions. He was also the managing trustee of Free Polio Surgical and Research Foundation.

== Social service ==
Adinarayana Rao was popular across India, especially in North India, for his treatment of polio victims. He held about 1000 orthopaedic camps across the country for the benefit of the polio-afflicted. Patients from states like Gujarat and Rajasthan and even foreign countries like the US, Canada and Pakistan used to get treated by him. He performed more than three lakh surgeries and over 10 lakh operative procedures in over four decades. His affable nature and understanding endeared him to patients.

== Awards ==
In 1988, Adinarayana Rao was presented a national Award by the Prime Minister of India for his welfare works for the disabled. He was also a recipient of the Madras Telugu Academy Award, Diwaliben Mohanlal Mehta Award, and National Mahaveer Awards by Bhagwan Mahaveer Foundation. In 2014, he received the National award for child welfare from the President of India. In 2022, he received Padma Shri.
