= List of Telugu people =

Notable Telugus

This is a list of notable Telugu people, also referred to as the Andhras in the Puranas. Telugu people are an ethnolinguistic group that speak Telugu, a Dravidian language in Southern India.

== Ancient dynasties and kingdoms ==
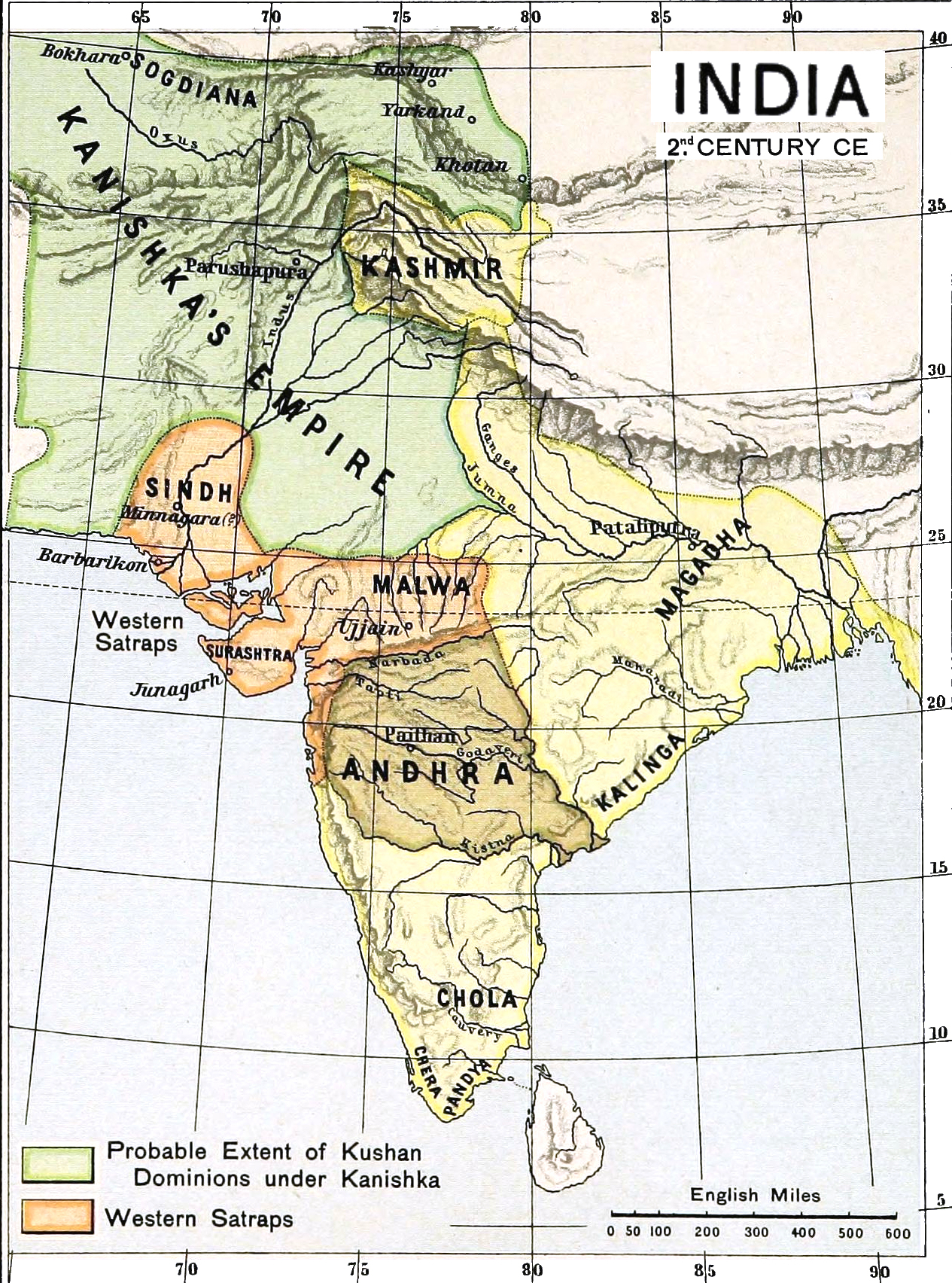
Satavahana Dynasty is also refers as Andhras

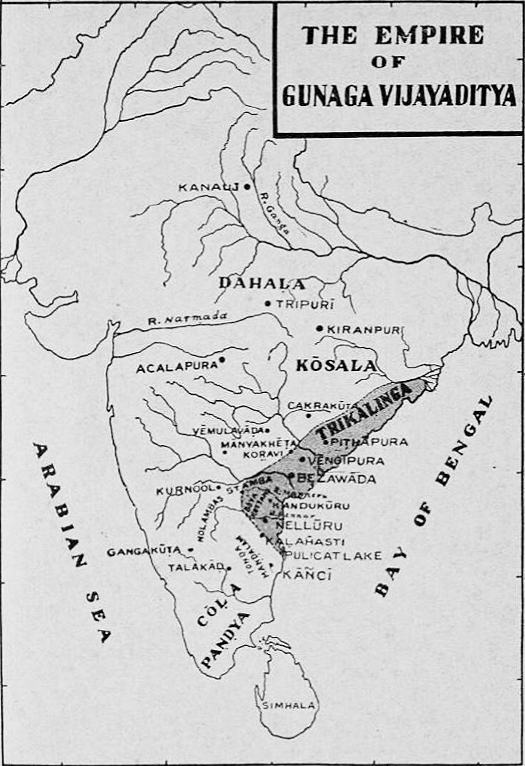
Eastern Chalukyas

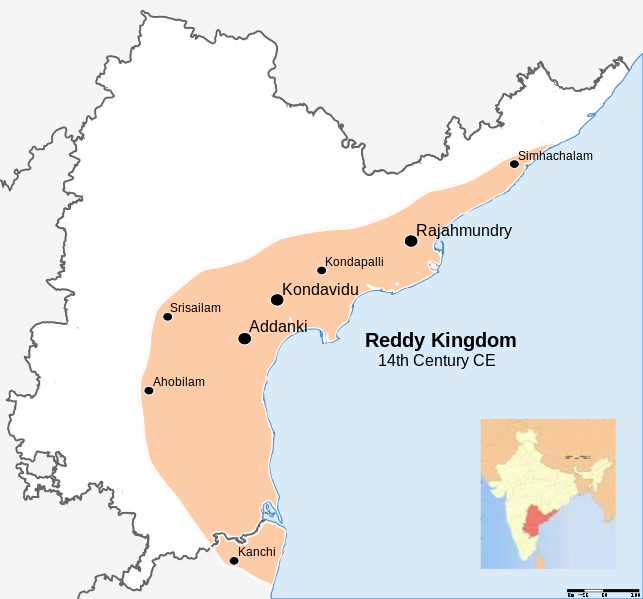
Reddy dynasty

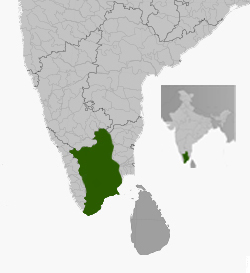
Madurai Nayak Dynasty

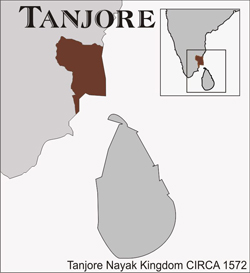
Nayaks of Tanjore

Ancient dynasties

- Satavahana dynasty, also referred to as Andhras (2nd Century BCE – 3rd Century CE)
- Andhra Ikshvaku (3rd Century CE – 4th Century CE)
- Bruhatpalayana (270 CE – 285 CE)
- Salankayanas (300 CE – 440 CE)
- Eastern Ganga dynasty (505 CE – 1434 CE)
- Vishnukundina Dynasty (420 CE – 624 CE)
- Eastern Chalukyas (624 CE – 1189 CE)

Medieval dynasties

- Pericchedi Kingdom (626 CE – 1292 CE)
- Chalukyas of Vemulavada (7th Century CE – 10th Century CE)
- Kakatiya dynasty (1163 CE – 1323 CE)
- Kota Dynasty (1100 CE – 1270 CE)
- Kondapadumati Dynasty (1114 CE – 1250 CE)
- Chagi Dynasty (1100 CE – 1477 CE)
- Reddy dynasty (1325 CE – 1448 CE)
- Gona Dynasty (13th Century CE)
- Aravidu Dynasty (1336 CE – 1646 CE)

Telugu Chodas

- Renati Chodas (5th Century CE – 9th Century CE)
- Velanati Chodas (1076 CE – 1216 CE)
- Pottapi Chodas (11th Century CE)
- Konidena Chodas (1050 CE – 1300 CE)
- Nannuru Chodas (12th Century CE)
- Nellore Chodas (11th Century CE – 12th Century CE)

Nayaks of South India

- Musunuri Nayakas (14th Century CE)
- Recherla Nayakas (1368 CE – 1435 CE)
- Pemmasani Nayaks (1423–1685)
- Sayapaneni Nayaks (16th Century CE)
- Nayaks of Gingee (1509–1649)
- Madurai Nayak dynasty (1529–1736)
- Nayaks of Tanjore (1532–1673)
- Nayaks of Kalahasti (1542 CE – 1646 CE)

Foreign countries

- Nayaks of Kandy (1739–1815) ruled Sri Lanka.

== Royalty ==
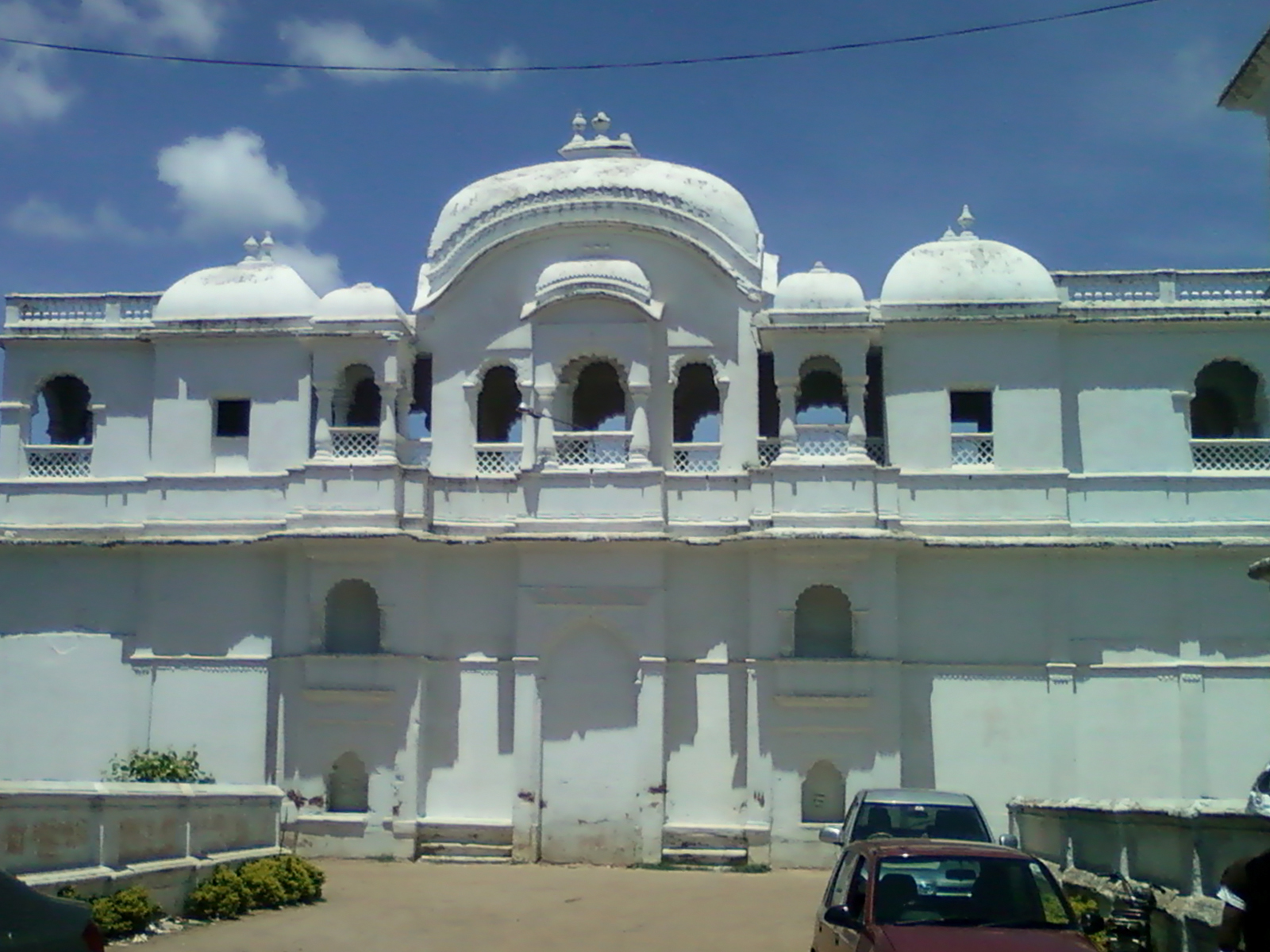
Main Entrance of Vizianagaram Fort

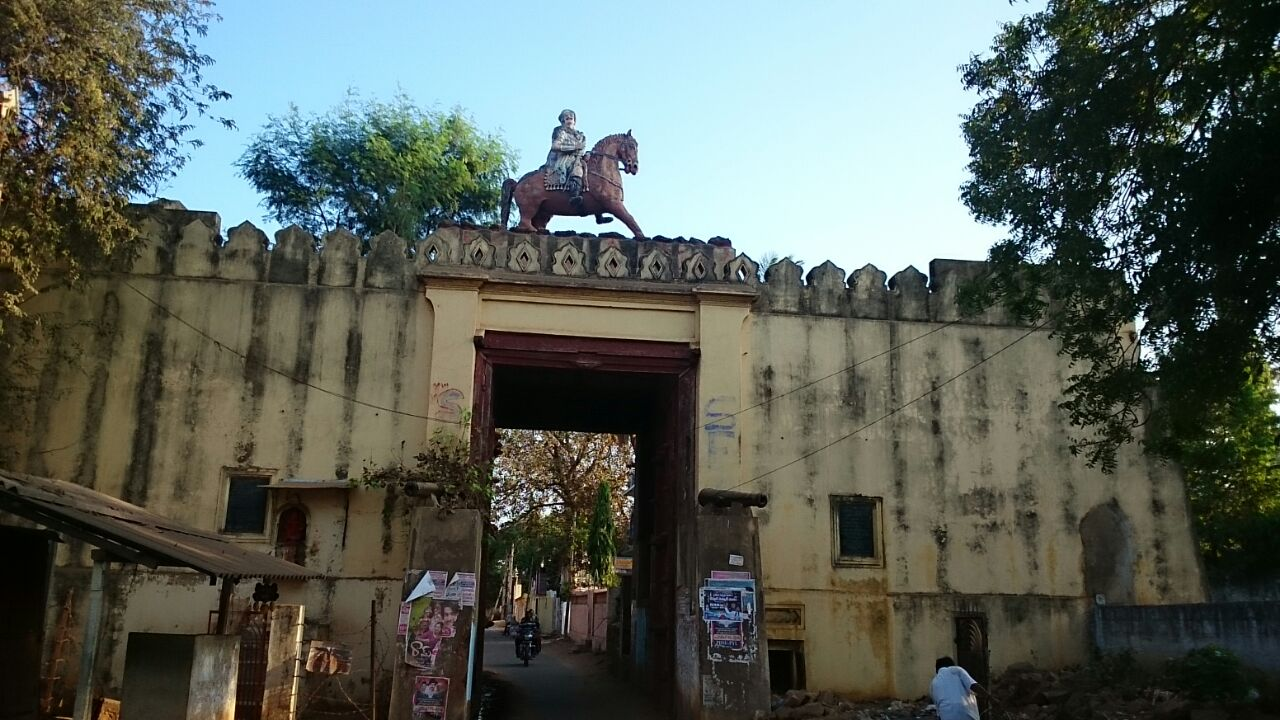
Nuzvid Estate

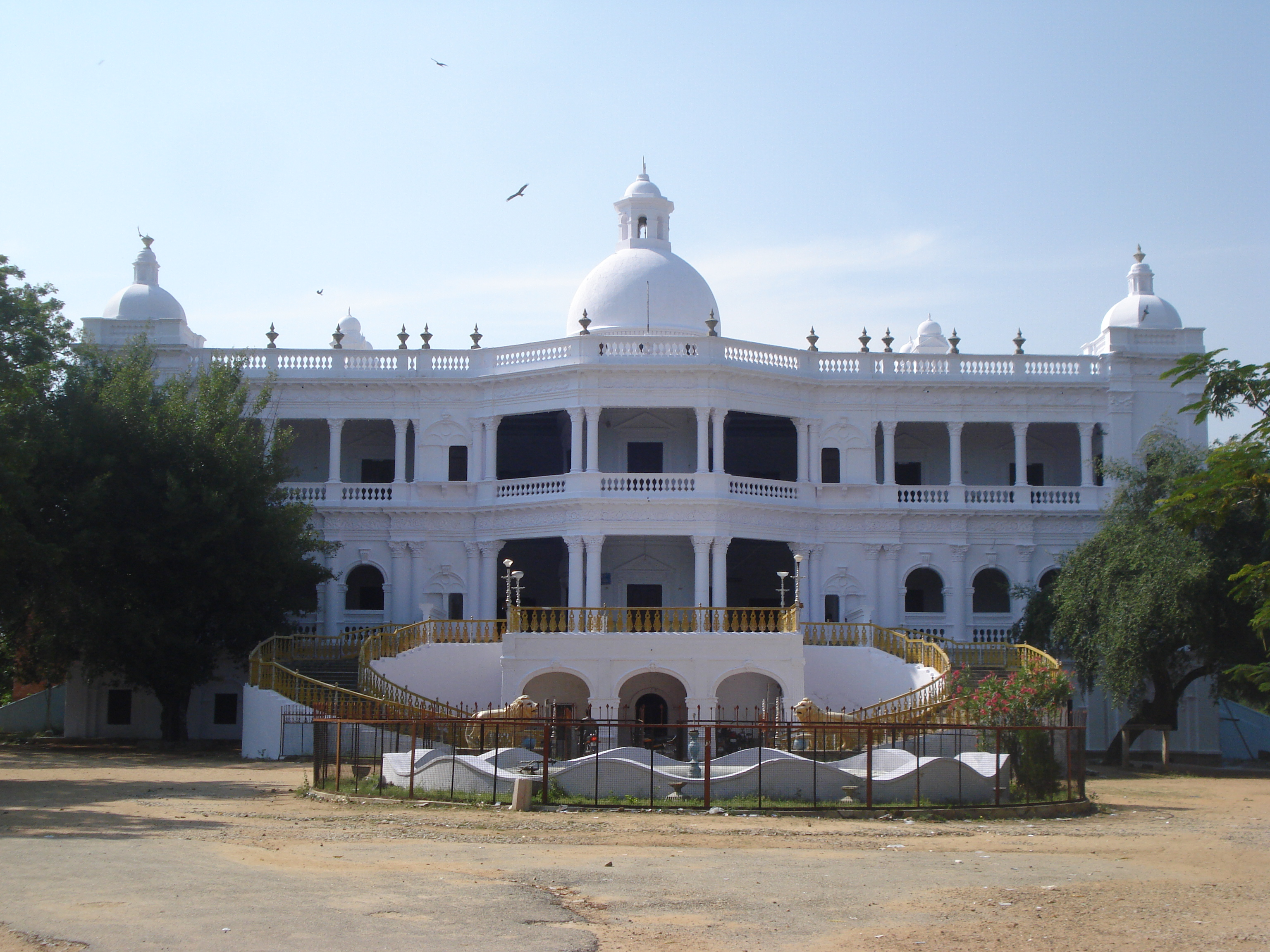
Wanaparthy Samsthanam's Palace

- Maharaja of Vizianagaram
- Bastar State
- Venkatagiri estate
- Thotapalle Estate
- Nuzvid Estate
- Pithapuram Estate
- Ettayapuram estate
- Bobbili Estate
- Rekapalle Estate
- Raja of Panagal
- Manyam Zamindar
- Gadwal Samsthanam
- Papannapet Samsthanam
- Wanaparthy Samsthanam

== Historical warriors and rulers ==
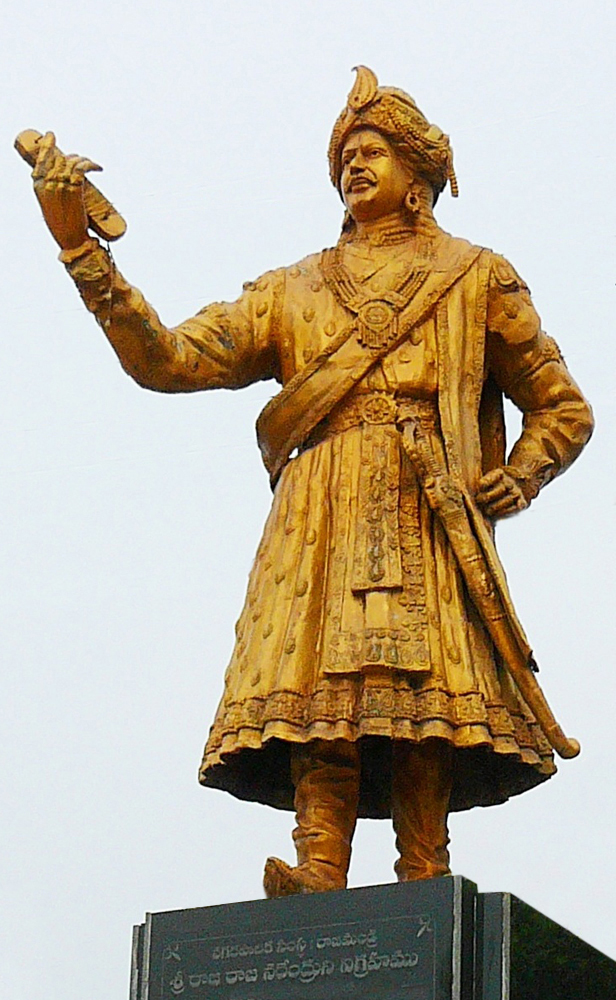
Emperor Rajaraja Narendra

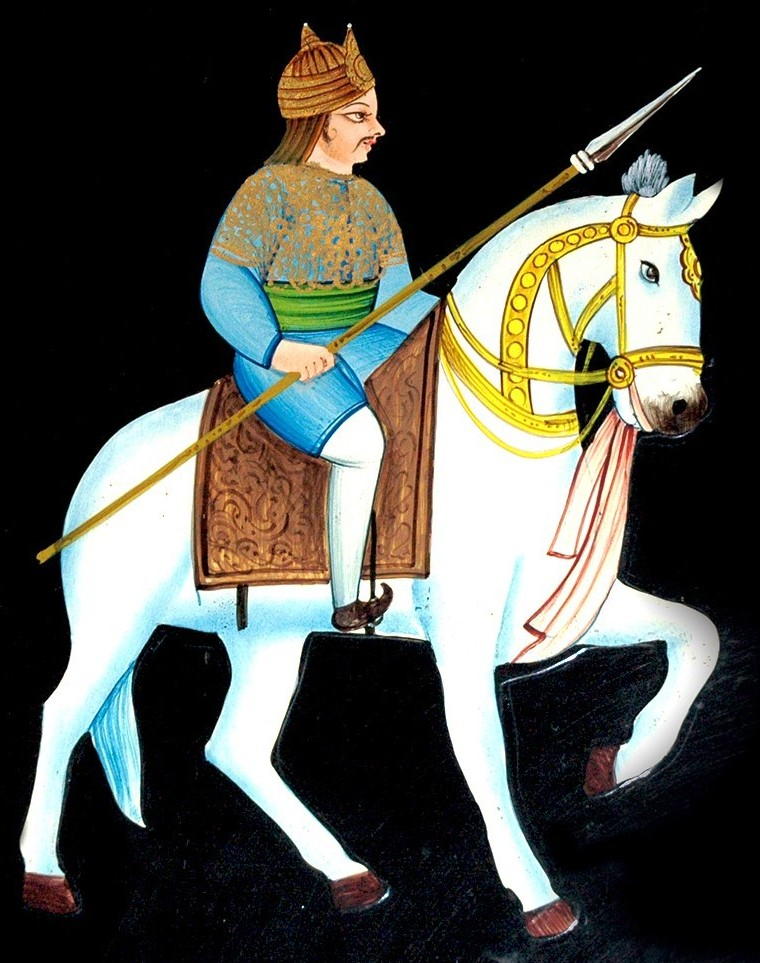
Kapaya Nayaka

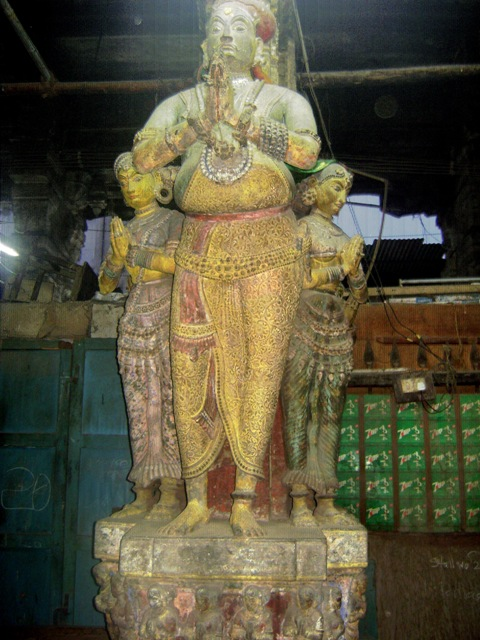
Tirumala Nayaka

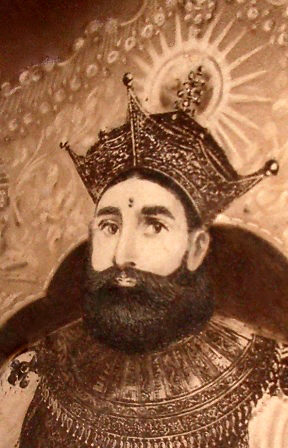
Sri Vikrama Rajasinha

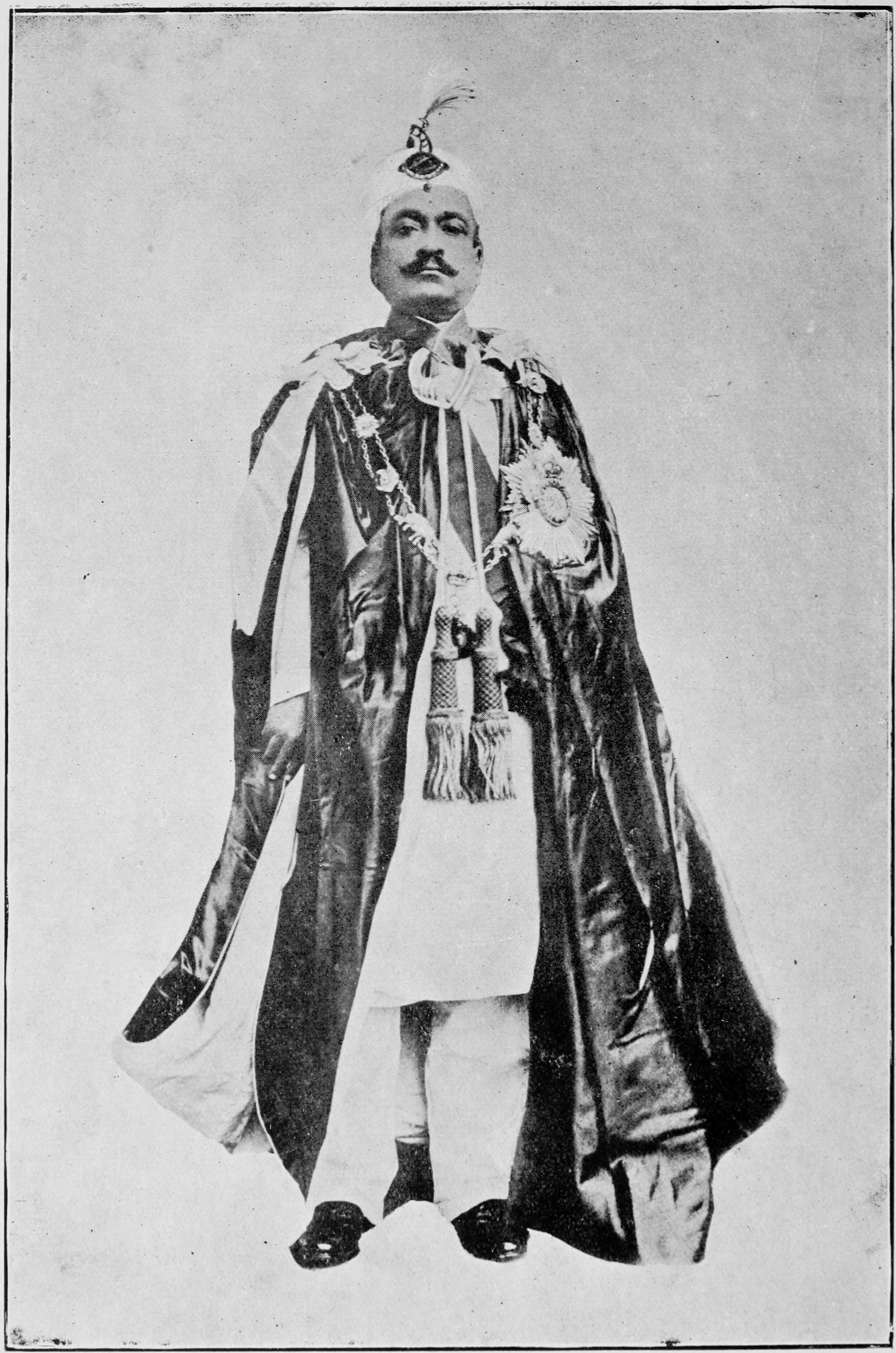
Rajagopala Krishna Yachendra

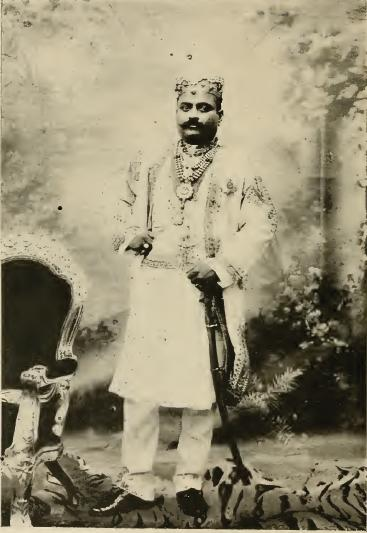
Sir Venkata Svetachalapathi Ranga Rao Bahadur

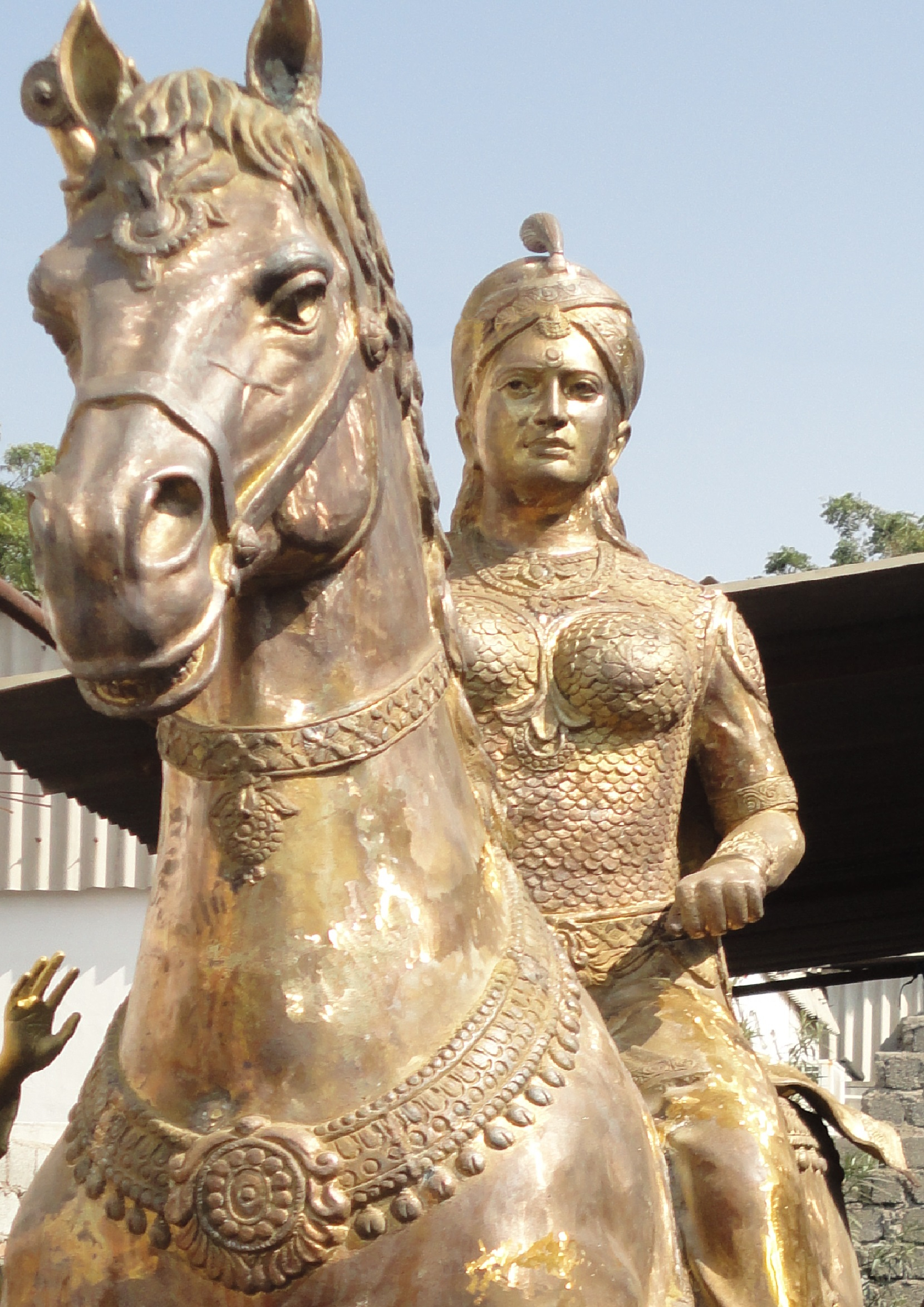
Rani Rudramadevi

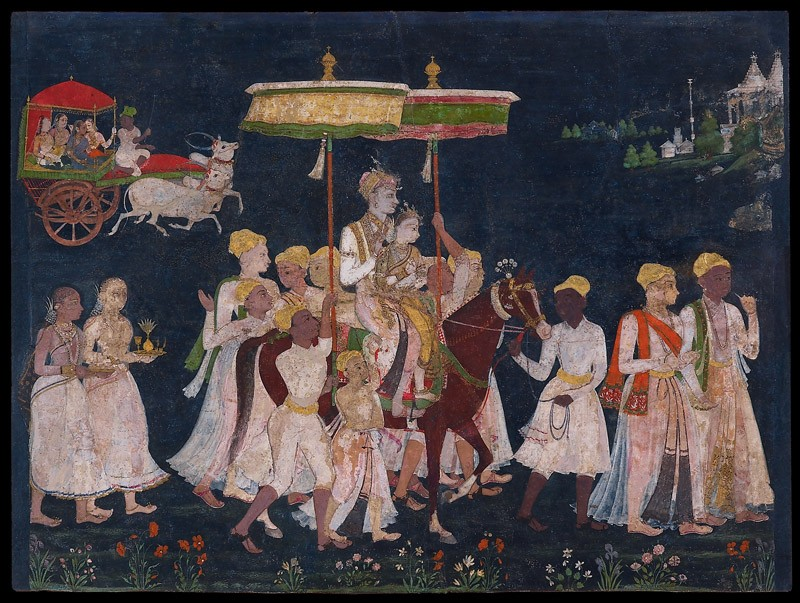
Wedding procession of Muhammad Quli Qutb Shah with Rani Bhagmati.

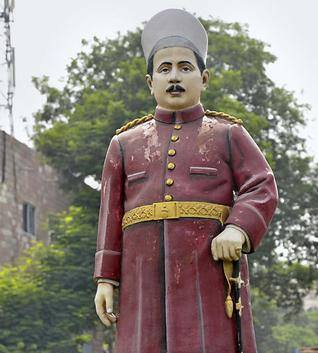
Statue of Raja Bahadur Venkatarama Reddy

- Gautamiputra Satakarni, He is the most powerful king of Satavahana Dynasty,
- King Kandara
- Madhava Varma II, He is the most powerful king of Vishnukundina Dynasty, He fought and won many more battles and he defeated Vakatakas King Prithivishena II.
- Rajaraja Narendra, He is the most powerful king of Eastern Chalukyas, and patronage to Telugu language.
- Ganapati Deva, He is the greatest king of Kakatiya Dynasty, He Unified Telugu Lands.
- Kulottunga I, He is the first Chalukya Cholas emperor, He Conqueror Kalinga, Sri Lanka, and Victory In Battle.
- Gonka II, He was regarded as greatest among of all Chodas and also fought as general in earlier battles during his father reign.
- Gopana, Army commander of Vijayanagara Empire.
- Madanna and Akkanna, Two Brothers and Historical Warriors.
- Jayapa Nayudu, He defeated a Velanati Chodas, Jayapa participated in the Kakatiya conquest of Ganapatideva and was honoured with the title "Vairigodhuma Gharatta".
- Gona Budda Reddy, He was a poet and ruler lived in Southern India.
- Prolaya Vema Reddy, First ruler of Reddi Kingdom, He was part of the confederation of states that started a Guerilla Tactics Movement against the invading Turkic Muslim armies of the Delhi Sultanate.
- Rama Raya, Vijayanagara Emperor, Founder of Aravidu Dynasty.
- Venkatapati Raya, Aravidu dynasty. He dealt successfully with the Deccan Sultans of Bijapur and Golkonda, the internal disorders, promoting economic revival in the country.
- Timmarusu, was the Prime Minister of Krishna Deva Raya . He had also served as Prime Minister under Viranarasimha Raya and Tuluva Narasa Nayaka.
- Kapaya Nayaka, Historical warrior and opposed Muslim rule.
- Palanati Brahmanaidu, Historical warrior.
- Nagama Nayaka, He defeated Veerasekhara chola, and is the father of Viswanatha Nayak.
- Viswanatha Nayak, Founder of Madurai Nayak Dynasty; defeated five Pandiyan kings.
- Thirumala Nayaka, He is the most powerful king of Madurai Nayak Dynasty, war Against Bijapur Sultanate and Victory in the Battle.
- Bangaru Thirumala Nayaka, He was a member of Madurai Nayak royal family and Military Commander of the Madurai Nayak King Vijaya Ranga Chokkanatha (1704–1731).
- Sevappa Nayak, first ruler of Nayaks of Tanjore.
- Raghunatha Nayak, He is the most powerful king of Nayaks of Tanjore.
- Khem Nayak, He led a Rebellion as the Military Commander of Thanjavur Nayak against the Portuguese in their conquest of the Jaffna kingdom in 1619.
- Pemmasani Ramalinga Nayudu, won the Battle of Raichur for Sri Krishna Devaraya. Commander of Vijayanagara Empire Army.
- Malik Maqbul Tilangani, He was a Military Commander in the Kakatiya Dynasty.
- Shitab Khan, He joined as a foot soldier in the army of Humayun Shah, the Bahmani Sultan.
- Damarla Chennappa Nayaka, Notable Ruler of Nayaks of Kalahasti.
- Sri Vikrama Rajasinha, Last king of the Kingdom of Kandy
- Venkatarama Reddy, was the first Hindu kotwal of Kingdom of Hyderabad as in the late 19th and early 20th century,

Order of the Indian Empire

- Sir Pusapati Ananda Gajapati Raju, Maharaja of Vizianagaram, awarded Grand Commander of theOrder of the Indian Empire from the United Kingdom.
- Sir Rajagopala Krishna Yachendra, Maharaja of Venkatagiri, awarded Grand Commander of the Order of the Indian Empire and Companion of the Order of the Star of India from the United Kingdom.
- Rao Venkata Kumara Mahipati Surya Rau, Maharaja of Pithapuram, He Awarded Order of the Indian Empire From United Kingdom.
- Venkata Ranga Rao, Maharaja of Bobbili, He Awarded Order of the Indian Empire From United Kingdom.
- Panaganti Ramarayaningar, He is Raja of Panagal, He Awarded Order of the Indian Empire From United Kingdom.

Women Rulers

- Rani Rudrama Devi, She is the most powerful queen of Kakatiya Dynasty.
- Rani Mangammal, She is the most powerful queen of Madurai Nayak Dynasty.
- Bhagmati was a mystic Hindu queen.
- Govindamamba Pemmasani
- Nayakuralu Nagamma was a renowned statesperson and minister to King Nalagama, the ruler of Palanadu in Guntur District. In the epic war—Palnati Yudham (War of Palnadu).

== Governors of States ==
- Ashok Gajapathi Raju – Current Governor of Goa
- B. Satya Narayan Reddy – Former Governor of Odisha
- Bandaru Dattatreya – Current Governor of Haryana and Former Governor of Himachal Pradesh
- Bezawada Gopala Reddy – Former Governor of Uttar Pradesh
- C. Vidyasagar Rao – Former Governor of Maharashtra and Tamil Nadu
- K. V. Krishna Rao – Former Governor of Jammu and Kashmir, Nagaland, Manipur and Tripura
- Kambhampati Hari Babu – Current Governor of Mizoram
- K. V. Raghunatha Reddy – Former Governor of Tripura
- Kasu Brahmananda Reddy – Former Governor of Maharashtra
- Kona Prabhakara Rao – Former Governor of Maharashtra
- Konijeti Rosaiah – Former Governor of Tamil Nadu and Karnataka
- Marri Chenna Reddy – Former Governor of Tamil Nadu
- P. Chandra Reddy – Former Governor of Andhra Pradesh
- P. S. Ramamohan Rao – Former Governor of Tamil Nadu
- Pendekanti Venkatasubbaiah – Former Governor of Bihar
- V. Rama Rao – Former Governor of Sikkim
- V. S. Ramadevi – Former Governor of Himachal Pradesh and Karnataka
- V. V. Giri – Former Governor of Karnataka

== Speaker of the Lok Sabha ==
- Neelam Sanjiva Reddy – Former Speaker of the Lok Sabha
- G. M. C. Balayogi – Former Speaker of the Lok Sabha

== Chief Ministers ==
- Tanguturi Prakasam – Former Chief Minister of Madras Presidency and Andhra State
- Burgula Ramakrishna Rao – Former Chief Minister of Hyderabad State
- A. Subbarayalu Reddiar – Former Chief Minister of Madras Presidency
- Panaganti Ramarayaningar – Former Chief Minister of Madras Presidency
- B. Munuswamy Naidu – Former Chief Minister of Madras Presidency
- Ramakrishna Ranga Rao of Bobbili – Former Chief Minister of Madras Presidency
- Kurma Venkata Reddy Naidu – Former Chief Minister of Madras Presidency
- P. S. Kumaraswamy Raja – Former Chief Minister of Madras Presidency
- Bezawada Gopala Reddy – Former Chief Minister of Andhra Pradesh
- Neelam Sanjiva Reddy – Former Chief Minister of Andhra Pradesh
- Damodaram Sanjivayya – Former Chief Minister of Andhra Pradesh
- Kasu Brahmananda Reddy – Former Chief Minister of Andhra Pradesh
- P. V. Narasimha Rao – Former Chief Minister of Andhra Pradesh
- Jalagam Vengala Rao – Former Chief Minister of Andhra Pradesh
- Marri Chenna Reddy – Former Chief Minister of Andhra Pradesh
- Tanguturi Anjaiah – Former Chief Minister of Andhra Pradesh
- Bhavanam Venkatarami Reddy – Former Chief Minister of Andhra Pradesh
- Kotla Vijaya Bhaskara Reddy – Former Chief Minister of Andhra Pradesh
- N. Janardhana Reddy – Former Chief Minister of Andhra Pradesh
- Y. S. Rajasekhara Reddy – Former Chief Minister of Andhra Pradesh
- K. Rosaiah – Former Chief Minister of Andhra Pradesh
- N. Kiran Kumar Reddy – Former Chief Minister of Andhra Pradesh
- K. C. Reddy – Former Chief Minister of Mysore State
- V. Venkatasubha Reddiar – Former Chief Minister of Puducherry
- N. T. Rama Rao – Former Chief Minister of Andhra Pradesh
- N. Chandrababu Naidu – Current Chief Minister of Andhra Pradesh
- Y. S. Jaganmohan Reddy – Former Chief Minister of Andhra Pradesh
- K. Chandrashekar Rao – Former Chief Minister of Telangana

== Deputy Chief Ministers ==
- Neelam Sanjeeva Reddy – Former Deputy Chief Minister of Andhra Pradesh
- Damodar Raja Narasimha – Former Deputy Chief Minister of Andhra Pradesh
- Koneru Ranga Rao – Former Deputy Chief Minister of Andhra Pradesh
- J.V. Narsing Rao – Former Deputy Chief Minister of Andhra Pradesh
- C. Jagannatha Rao – Former Deputy Chief Minister of Andhra Pradesh
- Konda Venkata Ranga Reddy – Former Deputy Chief Minister of Andhra Pradesh
- K. E. Krishnamurthy – Former Deputy Chief Minister of Andhra Pradesh
- Nimmakayala Chinarajappa – Former Deputy Chief Minister of Andhra Pradesh
- T. Rajaiah – Former Deputy Chief Minister of Telangana
- Kadiyam Srihari – Former Deputy Chief Minister of Telangana
- M. Bhatti Vikramarka – Current Deputy Chief Minister of Telangana
- K. Pawan Kalyan – Current Deputy Chief Minister of Andhra Pradesh

== Presidents, Governors-General, Vice-Presidents & Prime Ministers ==
Presidents

- Sarvepalli Radhakrishnan – Former President of India and former Vice President of India
- V. V. Giri – Former President of India and former Vice President of India
- Neelam Sanjiva Reddy – Former President of India

Vice Presidents

- Venkaiah Naidu – Former Vice President of India

Governors-General

- Anand Satyanand – Governor-General of New Zealand from 2006 to 2011, the first Roman Catholic, Asian, ethnic minority as well as ethnic Indian officeholder of the position

Prime Ministers

- P. V. Narasimha Rao – Former Prime minister of India

== Revolutionaries ==
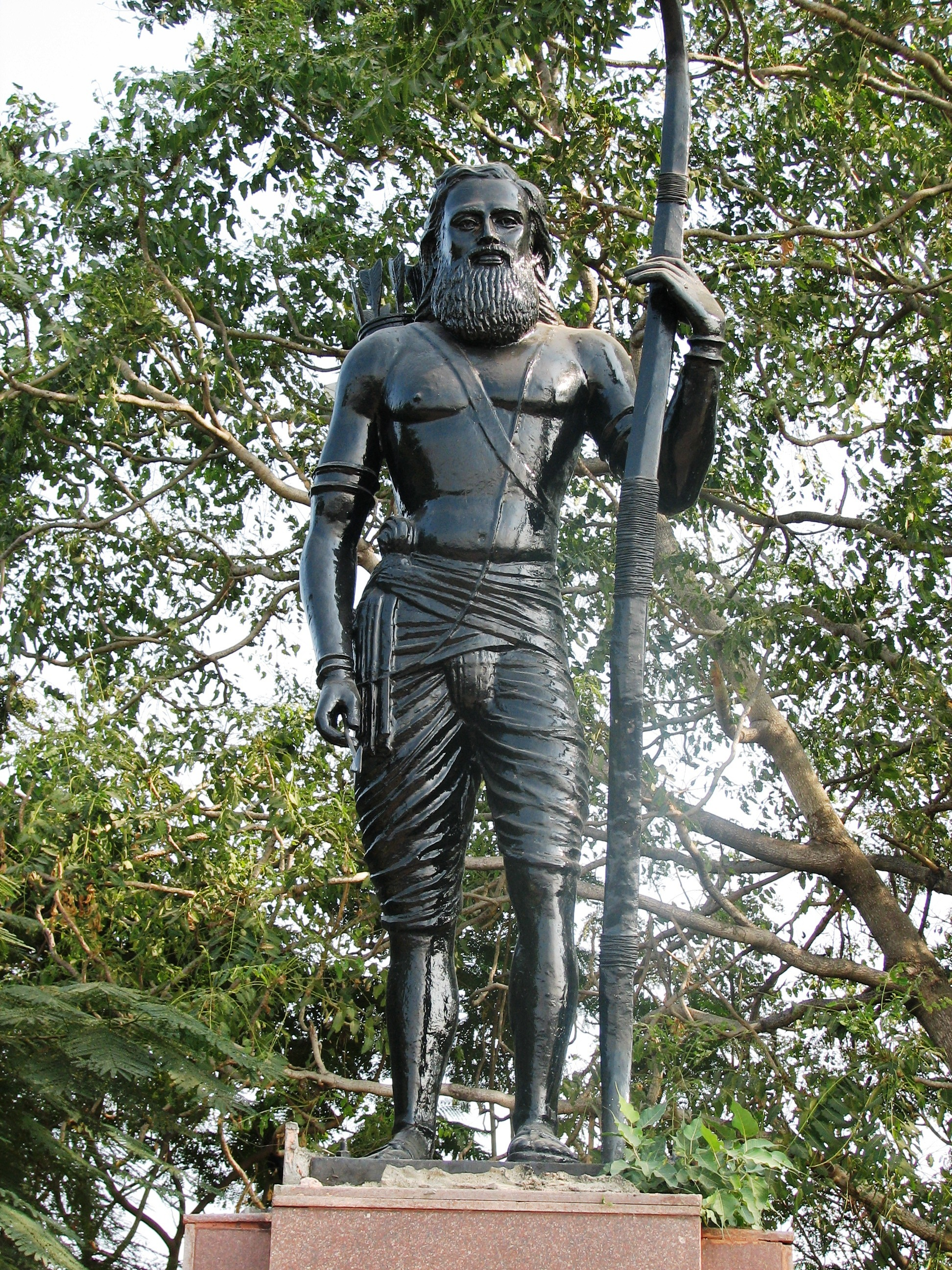
Alluri Sitarama Raju

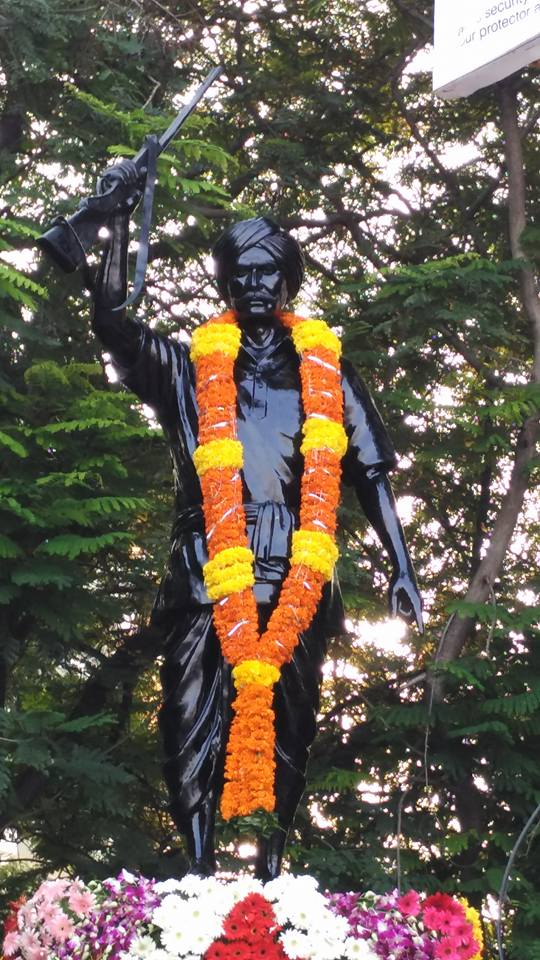
Komaram Bheem

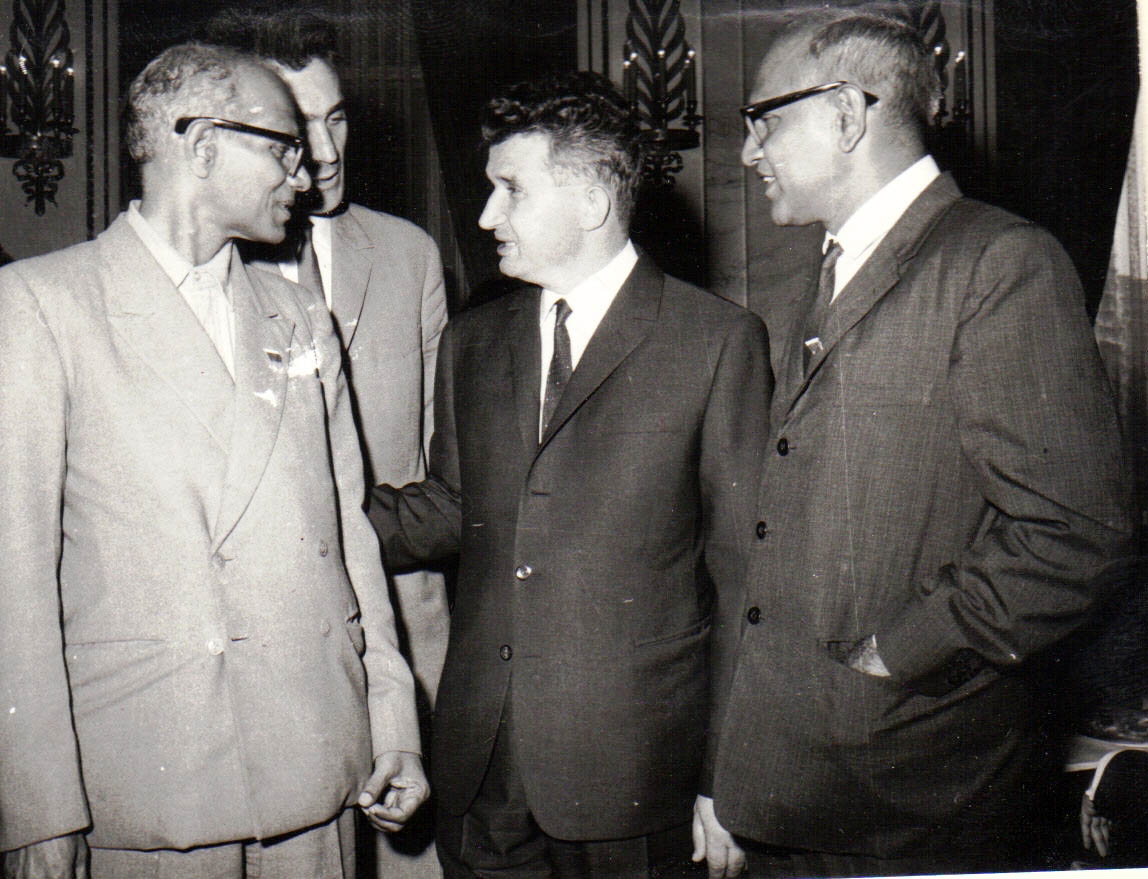
Puchalapalli Sundarayya With Comrade's Association

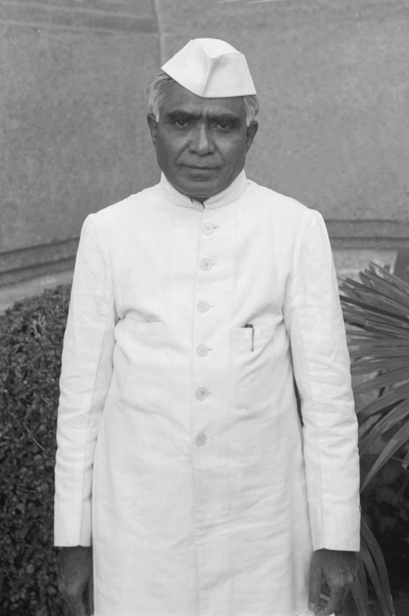
Burgula Ramakrishna Rao

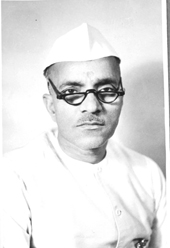
Konda Venkata Ranga Reddy

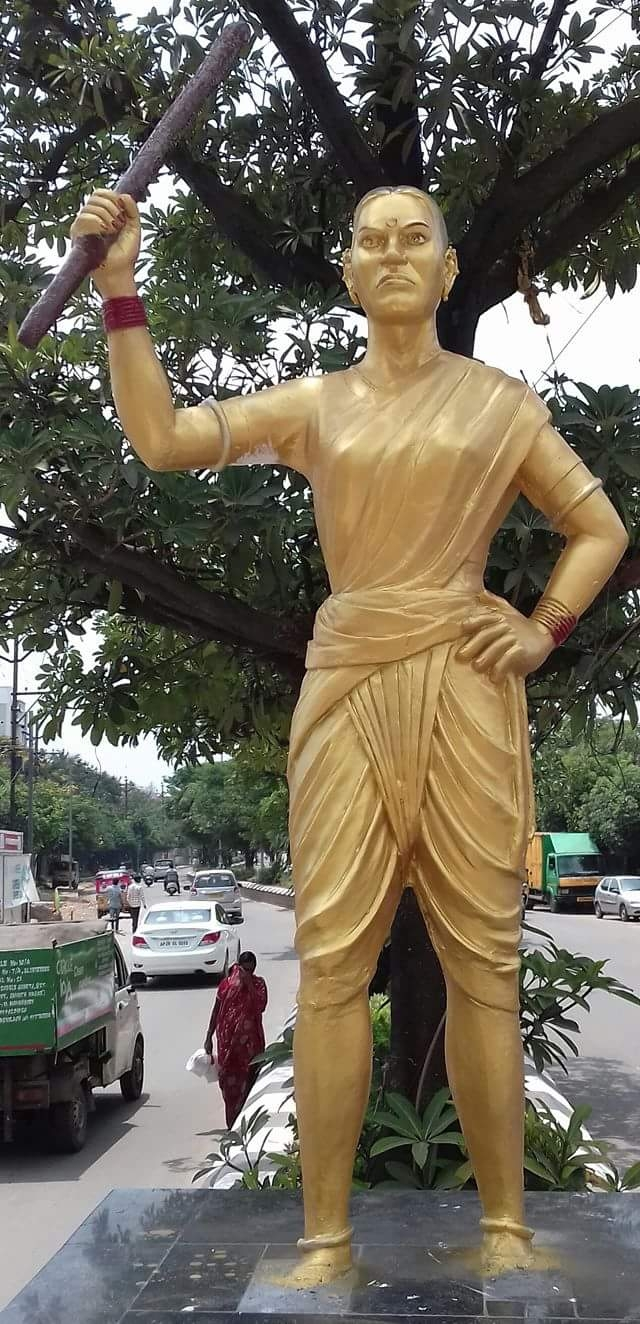
Chakali Ilamma

- Alluri Sitarama Raju – freedom fighter & Revolutionary (Viplava Jyothi)
- Komaram Bheem – was an Indian tribal leader who fought against the Asaf Jahi Dynasty for the liberation of Hyderabad .He took up arms against Nizam's soldiers, who he fought until his last breath.
- Uyyalawada Narasimha Reddy – An Indian freedom fighter and chieftain, widely recognized as one of the first individuals to revolt against the British East India Company in the Telugu regions in the mid-19th century (specifically, the 1846–1847 uprising in Kurnool district).
- Anabheri Prabhakar Rao – was a Telangana guerrilla leader and is also considered a foremost authority of the Telugu language. He was an Indian freedom fighter, considered to be one of the most influential revolutionaries of the Indian independence movement.
- Arutla Ramchandra Reddy – was an Indian freedom fighter. He was among the leaders and fighters in the armed freedom struggle against the rule of Nizam.
- Kaloji Narayana Rao – was an Indian poet, freedom fighter, anti-fascist and political activist of Telangana.
- Raavi Narayana Reddy – was a leader in the Telangana Rebellion against the rule of Osman Ali Khan, Asaf Jah VII.
- Baddam Yella Reddy – was an Indian Communist politician from Telangana. He was one of the prominent leaders in the Telangana armed struggle against the Nizam Regiment.
- Puchalapalli Sundarayya – was a founding member of the Communist Party of India (Marxist) and a leader of the peasant revolt in the former Hyderabad State of India, called the Telangana Rebellion. He is popularly known as Comrade PS.
- Bhimreddy Narasimha Reddy – was a freedom fighter and a leader of the Telangana Rebellion, he was known, fought the Razakars during the Nizam's rule for six years by being underground.
- Nandyala Srinivasa Reddy – was a Member of Legislative Assembly, Andhra Pradesh and a leader of the Telangana Rebellion. He is popularly known as NSR.
- Burgula Ramakrishna Rao – was among the Telugu-speaking leaders to resist the Nizam in the princely state of Hyderabad.
- Chakali Ilamma – was an Indian revolutionary leader during the Telangana Rebellion.
- Konda Venkata Ranga Reddy – is a freedom fighter who fought the Telangana Rebellion against the Jagirdars.
- Chandra Rajeswara Rao – was an Indian freedom fighter from Andhra Pradesh. He was one of the leaders of the Telangana Rebellion (1946–1951). He also worked as Communist Party of India (CPI).
- K. Balagopal, A Mathematician and Marxist-Communist.

== Militants and Rebels ==
- Nambala Keshava Rao, his nom de guerre “Basavraj”, He is a Leader and General Secretary of the Communist Party of India (Maoist), currently on National Investigation Agency Most Wanted.
- Muppala Lakshmana Rao, by his nom de guerre “Ganapathy”, He is a Commander-in-chief of the People's Liberation Guerrilla Army (India) is the Armed Wing of the Communist Party of India (Maoist).
- Mallojula Koteswara Rao, commonly known by his nom de guerre “Kishenji”, was an Indian political terrorist who was a Politburo and Central Military Commission member of the Communist Party of India (Maoist).
- Patel Sudhakar Reddy, was a leader of the central committee of the Communist Party of India (Maoist).
- Yalavarthi Naveen Babu, He was a Naxalite leader in India, He was founder of All India Revolutionary Students Federation.
- Thippiri Tirupathi, is an Indian Maoist leader and Central Committee member of the Communist Party of India (Maoist).
- Cherukuri Rajkumar, (alias Azad), was the spokesperson and one of the seniormost members of the Central Politburo of the banned Maoist group Communist Party of India (Maoist) . On 1 July 2010, he was killed by Andhra Pradesh Police in an encounter.
- Sadanala Ramakrishna, is an Indian Maoist politician, senior leader of Communist Party of India (Maoist) and head of the Central Technical Committee of the party.
- Ginugu Narsimha Reddy, is a Maoist politician and Central Committee member of the Communist Party of India (Maoist).
- Kondapalli Seetharamaiah, was a senior Communist leader and Maoist organizer in India.
- Mallujola Venugopal, is a Politburo and Central Military Commission member of the Communist Party of India (Maoist), a banned Maoist insurgent communist party in India .
- Katakam Sudarshan, commonly known by his nom de guerre,(Anand) is a Politburo member of the Communist Party of India (Maoist).
- B. Sudhakar, is a Maoist leader and members of the Politburo of the Communist Party of India (Maoist).
- Varkapur Chandramouli, was an Indian Maoist leader and Central Committee member of Communist Party of India (Maoist).
- Varanasi Subramanyam, is an Indian Maoist and Central Committee member of Communist Party of India (Maoist).
- Kadari Satyanarayan Reddy, known by his nom de guerre, “Kosa”, he is a banned Maoist Insurgent Communist Party of India, he was a Central Committee member of the Communist Party of India (Maoist)
- George Reddy, He was a university student, remembered now primarily for his promotion of Marxist ideas, Reddy was killed in an attack at his college campus on 14 April 1972.
- Varavara Rao, is an Indian activist, poet, teacher, and writer, He is an accused in the 2018 Bhima Koregaon violence and has been arrested under the Unlawful Activities (Prevention) Act.
- Gummadi Vittal Rao, is a poet, revolutionary Telugu balladeer and local Naxalite activist from what is now the state of Telangana.
- Gita Ramaswamy, is an Indian social activist and writer.
- Belli Lalitha, founder of Telangana Kala Samithi who was murdered in 1999.
- Narmada Akka, was one of the "senior-most" female cadres of the Communist Party of India (Maoist).
- Arunodaya Vimala, popularly known as vimalakka, Telugu balladeer and Social Activist.

== Military Chiefs ==
Indian Army

- General K. V. Krishna Rao, Chief of the Army Staff, 1981–1983

Indian Navy

- Admiral Ram Dass Katari, Chief of the Naval Staff, 1958–1962

== Politicians ==
India

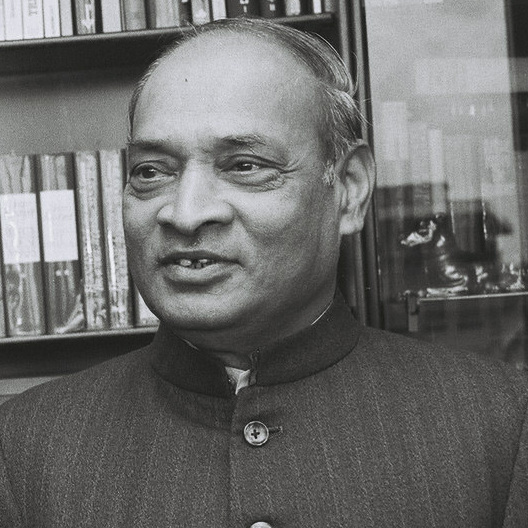
P. V. Narasimha Rao

- P. V. Narasimha Rao – 9th Prime Minister Of India
- N. T. Rama Rao, Founder of Telugu Desam Party.
- N. Chandrababu Naidu
- Venkaiah Naidu, vice president of India (2017–2022)
- Y. S. Rajasekhar Reddy
- K. Chandrashekar Rao, Founder of Telangana Rashtra Samithi
- Pawan Kalyan, Founder of Jana Sena Party
- Vangaveeti Mohana Ranga (born 1947), MLA from Vijayawada East
- Y. S. Jagan Mohan Reddy, Founder of YSR Congress Party
- Shabbir Ali, Minister during Indian National Congress rule in AP.

United States of America

- Saritha Komatireddy (born 1984 or 1985), federal prosecutor and former chief of staff of the U.S. Drug Enforcement Administration, Republican nominee for attorney general of New York in the 2026 election.
- Aruna Miller – American politician and former members of the Maryland House of delegates representing District 15 in Montgomery County, Maryland
- Shantanu Narayen – CEO of Adobe Inc
- Arvind Krishna – CEO of IBM
- Raja Kumari – Rapper, songwriter and singer
- Satya Nadella – The executive chairman and CEO of Microsoft.
- Suhail A. Khan – American conservative political activist

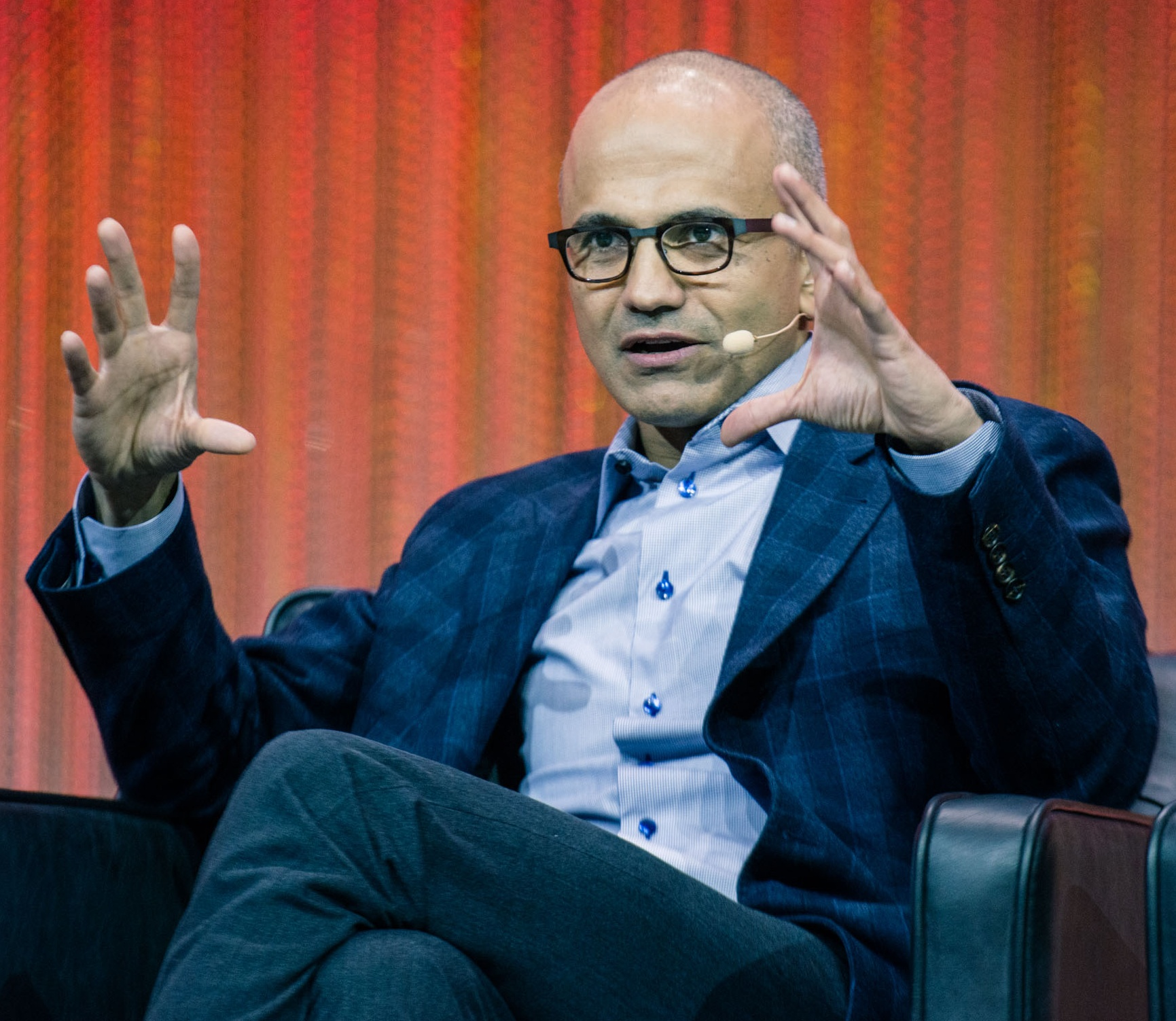
Satya Nadella

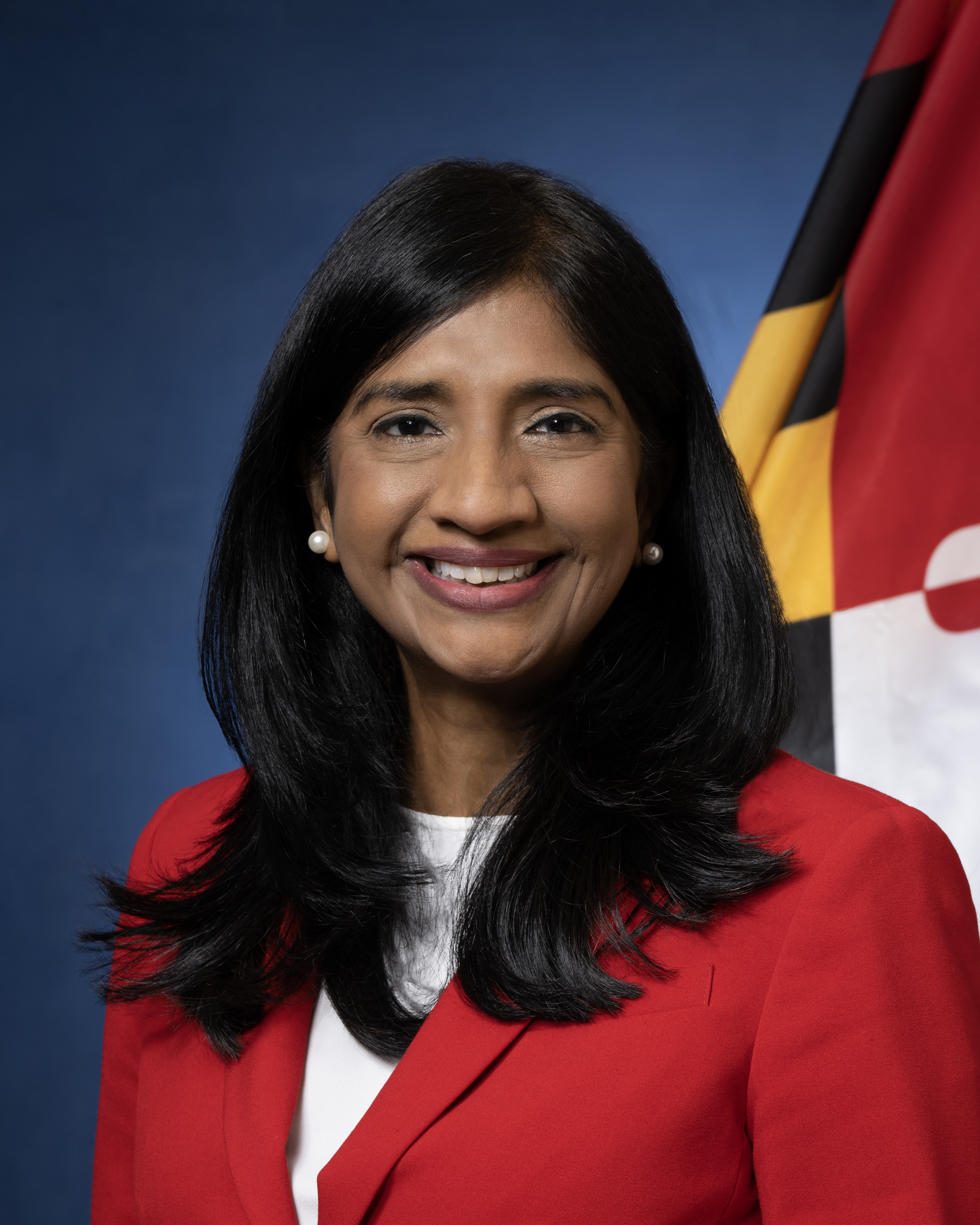
Aruna Miller

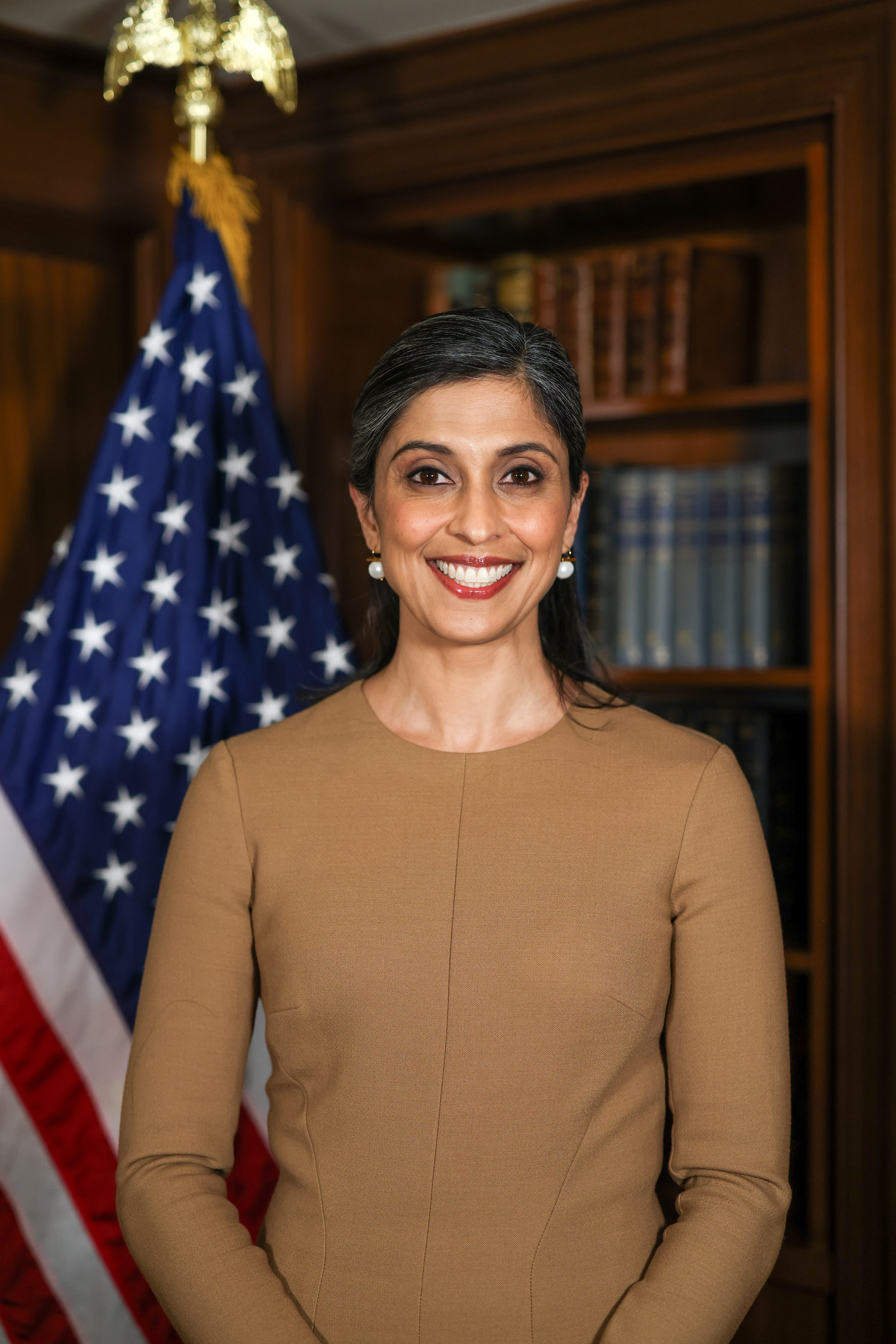
Usha Vance

- Surya Yalamanchili – Democratic nominee who ran for Congress in Ohio's 2nd congressional district in 2010
- Usha Vance – Current Second Lady of the United States. She is first Telugu Americans,Indian American and Asian American Second lady.
- Upendra Chivukula – Democratic politician who currently serves as a Commissioner on the New Jersey Board of Public Utilities after serving more than 12 years in the New Jersey General Assembly, where he had been the Deputy Speaker
- Vinai Thummalapally – U.S. Ambassador to Belize

South Africa

- Jay Naidoo – South Africa Independence Movement Activist
- Ama Naidoo – South Africa Independence Movement Activist
- Kumi Naidoo – South Africa Independence Movement Activist
- Naransamy Roy Naidoo – South Africa Political Activist
- Shanti Naidoo – South Africa Politician and Anti – Apartheid Activist

== Freedom fighters ==
- Alluri Sitarama Raju – freedom fighter and revolutionary (Viplava Jyothi)
- Gurajada Apparao
- Gurram Jashua
- Duggirala Gopalakrishnayya
- Vasireddy Venkatadri Nayudu – Zamindar of Amaravati (Guntur)
- N.G. Ranga
- P. Varadarajulu Naidu – was an Indian journalist and Indian independence activist. He was also the founder of The Indian Express
- Durgabai Deshmukh
- Uyyalawada Narasimha Reddy
- Kandukuri Veeresalingam – social reformer, writer, editor, performed first widow marriage in India
- Pingali Venkayya – freedom fighter and Indian National Flag designer
- Bhogaraju Pattabhi Sitaramayya – freedom fighter and founder of Andhra bank
- Pydimarri Venkata Subba Rao – writer of the National Pledge (India), written in Telugu first, later translated to other Indian languages
- Tanguturi Prakasam – was also known as Andhra Kesari (Lion of Andhra)
- Arutla Ramchandra Reddy – Indian freedom fighter & Telangana movement leader from Nalgonda
- Potu Narsimha Reddy – social reformer, Satyagraha Movement leader from Adilabad
- Vedre Ramachandra Reddy Bhoodhan – social reformer, Satyagraha Movement leader
- Potti Sreeramulu – responsible for the formation of linguistic states in India, died after fasting for statehood
- Vavilala Gopalakrishnayya – Gandhian and freedom fighter
- Nyapati Subba Rao Pantulu – one of the founder of The Hindu
- Sarojini Naidu
- Chowdary Satyanarayana – also known as Jananayak (People's leader) was an Indian freedom fighter, anti-colonial nationalist, human rights activist, legislator
- Komaram Bheem
- Gouthu Latchanna
- Kaneganti Hanumanthu
- Goparaju Ramachandra Rao
- Tripuraneni Ramaswamy Chowdary
- Tripuraneni Gopichand
- Cattamanchi Ramalinga Reddy (Sir C. R. Reddy)
- Kaloji Narayana Rao
- Anabheri Prabhakar Rao

== Scientists ==
- Satya N. Atluri, renowned aerospace scientist, Padma Bhushan awardee in 2013 in science and engineering; recipient of the Global Aerospace Prize of $100,000, the Walter & Angelina Crichlow Trust Prize of AIAA; recipient, "Excellence in Aviation Award", from the United States Federal Aviation Administration
- G. D. Naidu, the "Edison of India"
- G. Satheesh Reddy, Chairman of India's Defence Research and Development Organisation (DRDO) and Secretary of the Department of Defence R&D.
- Yellapragada Subbarao (1895–1948), Indian biochemist who made many important discoveries while working in the United States
- P. Varadarajulu Naidu, Indian physician, politician, journalist and Indian independence activist.
- Raj Reddy, renowned computer scientist and former Dean of the Carnegie Mellon School of Computer Science. Currently, the only Turing Award winner from India.
- Suri Bhagavantam, famous Indian scientist and administrator who worked and collaborated with C.V.Raman He worked as Director of the Indian Institute of Science and the Defence Research and Development Organisation and as adviser to the Indian defense ministry.
- Yelavarthy Nayudamma
- M. Visvesvaraya, Indian engineer, scholar and statesman on whose memory Engineer's day is celebrated across India
- C. Radhakrishna Rao, famous for his works in Maths and Statistics. The Cramer Rao bound theory and the Rao-Blackwell theorem are among his best known discoveries

== Economists and Policy makers ==
- M. Narasimham – Thirteenth Governor of RBI, Chaired Committee of Banking Sector reforms
- C. H. Hanumantha Rao – Member of the National Advisory Council from 2004 to 2008[2] and chaired the Technical Committee on Drought prone Areas Programme and Desert Development Programme of the Commission for Agricultural Costs and Prices.
- Y. Venugopal Reddy – Former Reserve Bank of India Governor from 6 September 2003 until 5 September 2008 – credited with imposing tough lending standards which shielded India from 2008 financial crisis
- Duvvuri Subbarao – Former Governor of Reserve Bank of India
- C. R. Krishnaswamy Rao – Former Cabinet Secretary
- V. K. R. V. Rao – Noted economist
- Narayana Kocherlakota – Former president of the Federal Reserve Bank of Minneapolis, Professor of Economics at the University of Rochester

== Writers ==
- Paravastu Chinnayasuri
- C. Narayana Reddy – Winner of Jnanapeeth award
- Tapi Dharma Rao Naidu – Writer
- Suravaram Pratap Reddy – Writer and historian from Telangana
- Kethu Viswanatha Reddy – Poet from Rayalaseema
- Kesava Reddy – Telugu novelist from Chittoor
- Ravuri Bharadhwaja – Winner of Jnanapeeth award Telugu novelist
- Malladi Venkata Krishna Murthy – Maximum number of stories written in Telugu – Over 3000
- Pullella Sriramachandrudu – Sanskrit and Telugu scholar
- Gidugu Venkata Ramamoorty – Writer
- Vegunta Mohan Prasad – Poet
- Mohammed Khadeer Babu – Writer

== Contribution to Telugu Language ==
Medieval Poets

- Malliya Rechana wrote the first Telugu prosody (chandassu) book called Kavijanasrayam.
- Nannaya Bhattaraka, also known as the First Poet "Aadi Kavi", the first poet of the Kavi Trayam, or "Trinity of Poets", that translated Mahabharatamu into Telugu over the course of a few centuries
- Tikkana also called "Tikkana Somayaji" (1205–1288), poet and member of Kavi Trayam
- Errana also known as "Yellapregada" or "Errapregada" (fl. 14th century).
- Gona Budda Reddy, 13th-century poet
- Annamacharya (1408–1503), mystic saint composer of the 15th century, widely regarded as the Telugu pada kavita pitaamaha (grand old man of simple poetry); husband of Tallapaka Tirumalamma
- Sri Krishnadevaraya, Vijayanagar Emperor, Telugu language patron, Telugu language poet
- Allasani Peddana, 15th century poet and known as foremost of Asthadiggajas (Eight elite Telugu poets under Sri Krishnadevaraya)
- Nandi Thimmana, a member of Ashtadiggajas
- Madayyagari Mallana, a member of Ashtadiggajas
- Dhurjati, a member of Ashtadiggajas
- Ayyalaraju Ramambhadrudu, a member of Ashtadiggajas
- Pingali Surana, a member of Ashtadiggajas
- Ramarajabhushanudu, a member of Ashtadiggajas
- Tenali Ramakrishna, poet, scholar, thinker and a special advisor in the court of Krishnadevaraya, nicknamed Vikatakavi
- Molla, also known as "Mollamamba", both popular names of Atukuri Molla (1440–1530), poet who wrote Telugu Ramayan; a woman
- Potana, born Bammera Pothana (1450–1510), poet best known for his translation of the Bhagavata Purana from Sanskrit; the book is popularly known as Pothana Bhagavatham
- Tallapaka Tirumalamma, also known as "Timmakka" and "Thimmakka" (fl. 15th century), poet who wrote Subhadra Kalyanam; wife of singer-poet Annamacharya and was popularly known as Timmakka
- Vemana (fl. 14th century), poet
- Bhadrachala Ramadasu, 17th-century Indian devotee of Lord Rama and a composer of Carnatic music

Renaissance Poets

- Kandukuri Veeresalingam (1848–1919), social reformer, poet, scholar, founded the journal Vivekavardhani, introduced the essay, biography, autobiography and the novel into Telugu literature
- Gurajada Apparao (1862–1915), poet, writer and playwright who wrote the first Telugu play, Kanyasulkam; also an influential social reformer sometimes called Mahakavi ("the great poet")
- Gurram Jashuva (1895–1971), a dalit poet and writer and producer of All India Radio, awarded "Padma Bhushan" by the Govt of India, known for poetry on social evils
- Srirangam Srinivasa Rao (1910–1983), marxist poet notable for his work Maha Prasthanam
- Jwalamukhi, pen name of Veeravalli Raghavacharyulu (1938–2008), poet, novelist, writer and political activist
- Viswanatha Satyanarayana (1895–1976), popularly known as the Kavi Samraat ("Emperor of Poetry")
- Balijepalli Lakshmikantham (1881–1953), poet and dramatist
- Chellapilla Venkata Sastry, poet and scholar
- Devulapalli Krishna Sastry (1887–1981), poet and writer of radio plays, known as "Andhra Shelly"
- Devarakonda Balagangadhara Tilak
- Divakarla Tirupati Sastry
- Rayaprolu Subba Rao
- C. R. Reddy

Modern Poets

- C. Narayana Reddy (born 1931), poet, academic and songwriter
- Aarudhra (1925–1998), author, poet, essayist, writer of stories (including detective stories), playwright, translator, composer of film songs
- Mohammad Ismail (born 1928–2003), Telugu-language poet, critic, academic and university administrator.
- Suravaram Pratap Reddy, writer and historian from Telangana
- Kethu Viswanatha Reddy, poet from Rayalaseema
- Gunturu Seshendra Sarma (1927–2007), also known as Yuga Kavi
- Papineni Sivasankar, poet and critic from Andhra Pradesh
- Sirivennela Sitaramasastri, popular poet and lyricist

== Religious Leaders and Philosophers ==
- Vallabhacharya – one of the prominent Bhakthi movement leaders
- Acharya Nagarjuna – Buddhist philosopher and alchemist
- Yogi Vemana – poet and philosopher
- Pothuluri Veerabrahmam – well-known saint and astrologer in the 17th century
- U. G. Krishnamurti – world-famous 20th century philosopher
- Jiddu Krishnamurti – 20th century spiritual teacher and philosopher
- Sringeri Shankaracharya
- Nimbarka – one of the four principal Vaishnav acharyas of India
- Vishnuswami – one of the four principal Vaishnav acharyas of India
- Vallabha – another major Vaishnav acharya
- Satya Sai Baba – internationally renowned Spiritual Master, based in Puttaparti
- Sadasiva Brahmendra – Bhakthi Poet
- Bhakta Potana – realised Soul and a Bhakthi poet who translated Bhagavatam to Telugu
- Kancherla Gopanna – also popularly known as Ramadasu
- Annamacharya – great devotee of Tirumala Lord Venkateswara who has written 40,000 songs and composed them
- Tyagaraja – great devotee of Lord SriRama who is excelled in carnatic music and have written and composed some 30,000 songs majorly on Sri Rama. He is born of a Telugu family, and brought up in present Tamil Nadu.
- Garikapati Narashima Rao - Indian scholar, litterateur, and avadhani from Andhra Pradesh. Received padmashri in 2022 from government of India. In 1996, he performed Avadhanam with 1116 Pruchchakas for 21 days in Kakinada.
- Syama Sastri – oldest among the Trinity of Carnatic music, Tyagaraja and Muthuswami Dikshitar being the other two. All his compositions are in Telugu. He is born of a Telugu family, and brought up in present Tamil Nadu.
- Sadhguru – mystic and yogi. Founder of Isha Yoga, a non profit organization. Born in Mysore to a Telugu-speaking family .

== Academics ==
- Cattamanchi Ramalinga Reddy – First Vice-Chancellor of Andhra University
- Sarvepalli Radhakrishnan – Second President of Republic of India, and noted Philosopher
- G. Ram Reddy – Former University Grants Commission chairman
- Sarvepalli Gopal – Indian historian
- Veluri Venkata Krishna Sastry – Archaeologist
- J. N. Reddy – Oscar S. Wyatt Endowed Chair in Mechanical Engineering at Texas A&M University
- Arjula Ramachandra Reddy – biologist, First vice-chancellor of Yogi Vemana University
- Pavani Parameswara Rao – a Senior Advocate in the Supreme Court of India

== Award winners ==
=== Olympic Medalists ===
Sr. no	Name	Sport	Gold	Silver	Bronze	Total
1	Karnam Malleswari	Weightlifting			1	1
2	P. V. Sindhu	Badminton		1	1	2

- Karnam Malleswari – Bronze medal for Weightlifting, first Indian woman to win a medal at the Olympics.
- P. V. Sindhu – Silver medal in 2016 and Bronze medal in 2020 for Badminton, the first Indian to become the Badminton World Champion and the only badminton player from India to win two consecutive medals at the Olympic Games.

=== Commonwealth Games medallists ===
- Pullela Gopichand – Badminton
- P. V. Sindhu – Badminton
- Jwala Gutta – Badminton
- Parupalli Kashyap – Badminton
- Srikanth Kidambi – Badminton
- Satwiksairaj Rankireddy – Badminton
- N. Sikki Reddy – Badminton
- Gadde Ruthvika Shivani – Badminton
- Chetan Anand (badminton) – Badminton
- Deepthi Chapala – Badminton
- Gurusai Dutt – Badminton
- Ragala Venkat Rahul – Olympic weightlifting
- Shailaja Pujari – Olympic weightlifting
- Neelam Setti Laxmi – Olympic weightlifting
- Santoshi Matsa – Olympic weightlifting
- Badathala Adisekhar – Olympic weightlifting
- Valluri Srinivasa Rao – Olympic weightlifting
- Sharath Kamal – Table tennis
- Mohammad Hussamuddin – Amateur boxing
- Mahesh Bhupathi – Tennis
- Rushmi Chakravarthi – Tennis

=== Bharat Ratna ===
- Sarvepalli Radhakrishnan, awarded 1954
- Mokshagundam Visvesvaraya, awarded 1955
- V. V. Giri, awarded 1975
- P. V. Narasimha Rao, awarded 2024

=== Padma Vibhushan ===
- N. G. Ranga
- P. V. R. Rao
- Padmaja Naidu
- Palle Rama Rao
- Prathap C. Reddy
- Ramoji Rao
- Ravi Narayan Reddy
- Roddam Narasimha
- S. P. Balasubrahmanyam
- Sadhguru
- Akkineni Nageswara Rao
- C. R. Rao
- Cingireddy Narayana Reddy
- K. Satchidananda Murty
- Kaloji Narayana Rao (1992)
- Kotha Satchidananda Murthy
- M. Balamuralikrishna
- M. N. Venkatachaliah
- M. Narasimham
- Sarvepalli Gopal
- Durgabai Deshmukh
- V. Ramalingaswami
- Y. V. Reddy
- Y. Venugopal Reddy (2010)
- Yamini Krishnamurthy
- Chiranjeevi

=== Padmabhushan ===
- Satya Nadella
- Nookala Chinna Satyanarayana
- Satya N. Atluri
- C. K. Nayudu
- C. Narayana Reddy
- P. Bhanumathi
- Pullela Gopichand
- P. V. Sindhu
- Maharajkumar of Vizianagram
- Chiranjeevi
- Krishna Ella
- A. V. Rama Rao
- D. Nageshwar Reddy
- S. P. Balasubrahmanyam
- P. Susheela
- Krishna
- G. V. Krishna Reddy
- Kallam Anji Reddy
- P. Chandrasekhara Rao
- D. Ramanaidu
- Anumolu Ramakrishna
- Yarlagadda Lakshmi Prasad
- Boyi Bhimanna
- Yamini Krishnamurthy
- B. V. Raju
- Palle Rama Rao
- Akkineni Nageswara Rao
- C. H. Hanumantha Rao
- K. I. Varaprasad Reddy
- N. Seshagiri
- S. S. Badrinath
- Prathap C. Reddy
- Vavilala Gopalakrishnayya
- Jaggayya
- Gottipati Brahmayya
- K. Satchidananda Murty
- Sripada Pinakapani
- Vuppuluri Ganapathi Sastry
- Pratury Trirumala Rao
- Gurram Jashuva
- Viswanatha Satyanarayana
- A. S. Rao
- Vennelakanti Raghavayya
- B. N. Reddy
- Devulapalli Krishnasastri
- Perugu Siva Reddy
- Mahankali Seetharama Rao
- Cheruvari Lakshmanan
- Manikonda Chalapathi Rau
- Mamidipudi Venkatarangayya
- Madapati Hanumantha Rao
- Andal Venkatasubba Rao
- K. A. Nilakanta Sastri
- Nandamuri Balakrishna

=== Padma Shri ===
- A. S. Rao
- A. V. Rama Rao
- Akkineni Nageswara Rao
- Allu Ramalingaiah
- Annavarapu Rama Swamy
- Asavadi Prakasarao
- Atluri Sriman Narayana
- AVS Raju
- A. Kanyakumari
- B. L. Deekshatulu
- B. Ramana Rao
- B. V. Raju
- B. V. Rao
- Bapu (director)
- Bhupathiraju Somaraju
- Boyi Bhimanna
- Brahmanandam
- C. Narayana Reddy
- C. Venkata S. Ram
- Challagalla Narasimham
- Chintakindi Mallesham
- Chintala Venkat Reddy
- Chittoor Mohammed Habeebullah
- D. Nageshwar Reddy
- D. V. S. Raju
- Dalavai Chalapathi Rao
- Daripalli Ramaiah
- Darshanam Mogilaiah
- Dasari Prasada Rao
- Dasika Durga Prasada Rao
- Dattatreyudu Nori
- Dwaram Venkataswamy Naidu
- G. Muniratnam
- Gajam Anjaiah
- Gajam Govardhana
- Garikapati Narasimha Rao
- Ghantasala
- Gnanananda Kavi
- Goriparthi Narasimha Raju Yadav
- Gosaveedu Shaik Hassan
- Govindan Sundararajan
- Guduru Venkatachalam
- Gullapalli Nageswara Rao
- Gummadi
- Harika Dronavalli
- I. V. Subba Rao
- Immaneni Sathyamurthy
- Iyyanki Venkata Ramanayya
- Jalakantapuram Ramaswamy Krishnamoorthy
- Jonnalagadda Gurappa Chetty
- K. Paddayya
- K. S. Chandrasekharan
- K. Viswanath
- Kadiyala Ramachandra
- Kailasam Raghavendra Rao
- Kakarla Subba Rao
- Kallam Anji Reddy
- Kallur Subba Rao
- Kalyanam Raghuramaiah
- Kanaka Raju
- Karnam Malleswari
- Katuru Narayana
- Kolakaluri Enoch
- Koneru Humpy
- Koneru Ramakrishna Rao
- Kota Srinivasa Rao
- Krishna Reddy
- Krishnaswami Ramiah
- Kutikuppala Surya Rao
- Lavu Narendranath
- Laxma Goud
- Mahesh Bhupathi
- M. Balamuralikrishna
- M. V. Rao
- M. Y. S. Prasad
- Machani Somappa
- Manjula Anagani
- Mohan Babu
- Moturi Satyanarayana
- Mudundi Ramakrishna Raju
- Mukesh Kumar
- Myneni Hariprasada Rao
- N. G. Krishna Murti
- N. T. Rama Rao
- Narain Karthikeyan
- Narla Tata Rao
- Nataraja Ramakrishna
- Nerella Venu Madhav
- Nidumolu Sumathi
- Nuthakki Bhanu Prasad
- P. Bhanumathi
- P. V. Sindhu
- Palle Rama Rao
- Pannuru Sripathy
- Perugu Siva Reddy
- Prem Watsa
- Pullela Gopichand
- Pullella Sriramachandrudu
- Puttaparthi Narayanacharyulu
- Raghu Ram Pillarisetti
- Raja and Radha Reddy
- Ravi Kumar Narra
- Rekandar Nageswara Rao
- Relangi
- S. M. Arif
- S. M. Ganapathy
- S. S. Badrinath
- S. S. Rajamouli
- Saibaba Goud
- Sakini Ramachandraih
- Shantha Sinha
- Sharath Kamal
- Sheik Chinna Moulana
- Shobha Naidu
- Shobha Raju
- Siramdasu Venkata Rama Rao
- Sirivennela Seetharama Sastry
- Sitaram Rao Valluri
- Sowcar Janaki
- Sribhashyam Vijayasarathi
- Srikanth Kidambi
- Srirangam Gopalaratnam
- Sthanam Narasimha Rao
- Sunkara Venkata Adinarayana Rao
- T. Venkatapathi Reddiar
- Tabu
- Turlapaty Kutumba Rao
- U. Srinivas
- V. Nagayya
- V. Narayana Rao
- V. Satyanarayana Sarma
- Vamsi Mootha
- Venkateswara Rao Yadlapalli
- Vijay Raghav Rao
- Vijayalakshmi Ravindranath
- Vinjamuri Venkata Lakshmi Narasimha Rao
- Vulimiri Ramalingaswami
- VVS Laxman
- Yarlagadda Lakshmi Prasad
- Yarlagadda Nayudamma
- Yella Venkateswara Rao
- V. Koteswaramma

=== Sahitya Akademi Award ===
Year	Author	Work
1955	Suravaram Pratap Reddy	Andhrula Sanghika Charitamu (Social History)
1956	Bulusu Venkateswarulu	Bharatiya Tattva Sastramu (Translation of Dr. Radhakrishnan's History of Indian Philosophy)
1957	Chariantanananda Swami	Sri Ramakrishnuni Jeevita Charitra (Biography)
1958	No Award	
1959	No Award	
1960	Ponangi Srirama Apparavu	Natyasastramu (A History of Bharata's Natyasastra)
1961	Balantrapu Rajanikanta Rao	Andhra Vaggeyakara Charitramu (A History of Telugu composers and songwriters)
1962	Viswanatha Satyanarayana	Viswanadha Madhyakkarulu (Poetry)
1963	Tripuraneni Gopichand	Panditha Parameswara Sastry Veelunama (Novel)
1964	Gurram Joshua	Kreestu Charitra (Poetry)
1965	Acharya Rayaprolu Subbarao	Misra Manjari (Poetry)
1966	No Award	
1967	No Award	
1968	No Award	
1969	Tummala Seetharama Murthy	Mahatma Katha (Poetry)
1970	D. Balagangadhar Tilak	Amrutham Kurisina Rathri (Poetry)
1971	Vasireddy Seethadevi; Thapi Dharma Rao	Samata (Novel); Vijayavilasamu: Hrudayollasavyakhya (Commentary)
1972	Srirangam Srinivasarao	Sri Sri Sahityamu (Poetry)
1973	C. Narayana Reddy	Mantalu Manavudu (Poetry)
1974	Dasaradhi	Thimiram Tho Samaram (Poetry)
1975	Boyi Bhimanna	Gudiselu Kalipotunnai (Poetry)
1976	Akella Syamala Rani	Harini (Novel)
1977	Kundurti Anjaneyulu	Kundurti Kritulu (Poetry)
1978	Devulapalli Venkata Krishna Sastry	Collected Works of Krishna Sastri (6 vols.)
1979	P. Narayanacharya	Janapriya Ramayanamu (Poetry)
1980	Kasi Viswanath Silukoti	Oka Deepam Veligindi (Play)
1981	Vasireddy Seethadevi; Narla Venkateswara Rao	Uritadu (Novel); Seeta Josyam (Play)
1982	Illindala Saraswati Devi	Swarna Kamalaalu (Short stories)
1983	Ravuri Bharadwaja	Jeevana Samaram (Sketches)
1984	Aluri Bairagi	Aagama Geeti (Poetry)
1985	Palagummi Padmaraju	Gaalivana (Short stories)
1986	G.V. Subramanyam	Andhra Sahitya Vimarsa Angla Prabhavam (Literary criticism)
1987	Arudra	Gurazada Gurupeetham (Essays)
1988	Vasireddy Seethadevi; Rachamallu Ramachandra Reddi	Maro Dayyam Katha (Novel); Anuvaada Samasyalu (Criticism)
1989	S. V. Joga Rao	Manipravalamu (Essays)
1990	Vasireddy Seethadevi; K Siva Reddy	Mrityunjayadu (Novel); Mohana-o-Mohana (Poetry)
1991	Bhamidipati Ramagopalam	Itlu, Mee Vidheyudu (Short stories)
1992	Malathi Chendur	Hrudaya Netri (Novel)
1993	Madhuranthakam Rajaram	Madhuranthakam Rajaram Kathalu (Short stories)
1994	Gunturu Seshendra Sharma	Kala Rekha (Criticism)
1995	Kalipatnam Ramarao	Yajnam To Tommidi (Short stories)
1996	Kethu Viswanatha Reddy	Kethu Vishwanatha Reddy Kathalu (Short stories)
1997	Penumarthi Viswanatha Sastri (Ajanta)	Swapna Lipi (Poetry)
1998	Balivada Kantha Rao	Balivada Kantha Rao Kathalu (Short stories)
1999	Vallampati Venkata Subbayya	Katha Silpam (Essays)
2000	N. Gopi	Kalanni Nidra Ponivvanu (Poetry)
2001	Tirumala Ramachandra	Hampi Nunchi Harappa Daka (Autobiography)
2002	Chekuri Ramarao	Smrti Kinankam (Essays)
2003	Utpala Satyanarayanacharya	Sri Krishna Chandrodayamu (Poetry)
2004	Ampasayya Naveen	Kala Rekhalu (Novel)
2005	Abburi Chayadevi	Tana Margam (Short Stories)
2006	Munipalle Raju	Astitvanadam Aavali Teerana (Short Stories)
2007	Gadiyaram Ramakrishna Sarma	Satapatramu (Autobiography)
2008	Chitiprolu Krishna Murthy	Purushottamudu (Poetry)
2009	Yarlagadda Laxmi Prasad	Draupadi (Novel)
2010	Syed Saleem	Kaluthunna Poolathota (Novel)
2011	Samala Sadasiva	Swaralayalu (Essays)
2012	Peddibhotla Subbaramayya	Peddibhotla Subbaramayya Kathalu Vol-1 (Short Stories)
2013	Katyayani Vidmahe	Sahityaakasamlo Sagam (Essays)
2014	Rachapalem Chandrasekhara Reddy	Mana Navalalu - Mana Kathanikalu (literary criticism)
2015	Volga	Vimuktha (Short Stories)
2016	Papineni Sivasankar	Rajanigandha (Poetry)
2017	Devi Priya	Gaali Rangu (Poetry)
2018	Kolakaluri Enoch	Vimarsini (Essay)
2019	Bandi Narayanaswamy	Sapta Bhoomi (Novel)
2020	Nikhileswar	Agniswaasa (2015-2017) (poetry)
2021	Goreti Venkanna	Vallanki Taalam (poetry)

=== Bala Sahitya Puraskar winners ===
Year	Author	Work
2010	Kaluvakolanu Sadananda	Adavi Thalli (Children's Novel)
2011	M. Bhoopal Reddy	Uggupaalu (Children short stories)
2013	D. Sujatha Devi	Aatalo Aratipandu (Stories)

=== Khel Ratna Award ===
The Khel Ratna Award is India's highest sporting honor.

- Karnam Malleswari – For Weightlifting
- Pullela Gopichand – For Badminton
- P. V. Sindhu – For Badminton
- Rohit Sharma – For Cricket

=== Jnanpeeth Award ===
- Viswanatha Satyanarayana for his work Ramayana Kalpavrukshamu for the year 1970.
- C. Narayanareddy for his Telugu poetic work Viswambara for the year 1988.
- Ravuri Bharadhwaja for his Telugu poetic work Pakudu Rallu (Crawling Stones) for the year 2012.

=== Sahitya Akademi Award ===
- Viswanadha Satyanarayana for his poetry book Viswanadha Madhyakaralu
- Balantrapu Rajanikanta Rao for Andhra Vaggeyakara Charitramu
- Suravaram Pratap Reddy for his social history book Andhrula Sanghika Charitamu (1955)
- Kethu Viswanatha Reddy for his short stories book Kethu Viswanatha Reddy Kathalu

=== Dada Saheb Phalke award ===
- Bomireddi Narasimha Reddy (1974)
- Paidi Jairaj (1980)
- L. V. Prasad (1982)
- B. Nagi Reddy (1986)
- Akkineni Nageswara Rao (1990)
- D. Ramanaidu (2009)
- K. Viswanath (2016)

=== Academy Award ===
- M. M. Keeravani (2023)

=== Golden Globe Award ===
- M. M. Keeravani (2023)

=== Critics Choice Movie Awards ===
- M. M. Keeravani (2023)
- S. S. Rajamouli (2023)

=== Dronacharya Award ===
- A. Ramana Rao – Volleyball (1990)
- Shyam Sunder Rao – Volleyball (1995)
- S. M. Arif – Badminton (2000)
- E. Prasad Rao – Kabaddi (2002)
- Koneru Ashok – Chess (2006)
- Pullela Gopichand – Badminton (2009)
- Nagapuri Ramesh – Athletics (2016)
- G. S. S. V. Prasad – Badminton (2017)
- Achanta Srinivasa Rao – Table Tennis (2018)

=== Arjuna Award ===
- V. V. S. Laxman – Cricket
- Rohit Sharma – Cricket
- Mukesh Kumar – Hockey
- PV Sindhu – Badminton
- Pullela Gopichand – Badminton
- Parupalli Kashyap – Badminton
- Chetan Anand – Badminton
- B. Sai Praneeth – Badminton
- Jwala Gutta – Badminton
- Srikanth Kidambi – Badminton
- Satwiksairaj Rankireddy – Badminton
- Sharath Kamal – Table Tennis
- Mahesh Bhupathi – Tennis
- Saketh Myneni – Tennis
- Koneru Humpy – Chess
- Pentala Harikrishna – Chess
- Harika Dronavalli – Chess
- Sharath Kamal – Table tennis
- Tulsidas Balaram – Football
- Karnam Malleswari – Weight lifting
- Kamineni Eswara Rao – Weight lifting
- P. V. Ramana – Volleyball
- Shyam Sunder Rao – Volleyball
- A. Ramana Rao – Volleyball

=== Ramon Magsaysay Award ===
The Ramon Magsaysay Award was established in 1957 in memory of Ramon Magsaysay, the late president of the Philippines. It is often considered to be Asia's Nobel Prize.

- Palagummi Sainath
- Shantha Sinha
- Bezwada Wilson

=== Guinness World Records ===
- S. P. Balasubrahmanyam – holds the Guinness World Record for having sung the most songs for any male playback singer in the world, with the majority of his songs sung in Telugu.
- P. Susheela – She entered the Guinness Book of World Records for recording the highest number of songs in musical history.
- Dasari Narayana Rao – holds the Guinness World Record as the most films directed with 151 films.
- D. Ramanaidu – holds the Guinness World Record as the most prolific producer with 130 films.
- Ramoji Film City – Guinness Record had been awarded to Ramoji Film City, Hyderabad as the largest film studio complex in the world, it opened in 1996 and measures 674 hectares (1,666 acres). With 47 sound stages, it has permanent sets ranging from railway stations to temples.
- Brahmanandam – M.R Brahmanandam holds the Guinness World Record for acting in the most films in a single language, 1000+ films.
- Vijaya Nirmala – in 2002, the Guinness Book of Records named Vijaya Nirmala as the female director with the most films, having made 47 films. In a career spanning approximately two decades, she has acted in over 200 films with 25 each in Malayalam and Tamil and produced 15 films.
- Chiranjeevi – in 2024, the Guinness Book of Records named Chiranjeevi most prolific film star in the Indian film industry, having danced in 537 songs across 156 films.

=== Sangeet Natak Akademi Fellowship ===
- V. Satyanarayana Sarma
- Nataraja Ramakrishna
- Vempati Chinna Satyam
- Rallapalli Ananta Krishna Sharma
- V. Satyanarayana Sarma
- M. Balamuralikrishna
- Yamini Krishnamurthy

=== Sangeet Natak Akademi Award ===
- Sthanam Narasimha Rao
- Banda Kanakalingeshwara Rao
- Kalyanam Raghuramaiah
- Peesapati Narasimha Murty
- M. Balamuralikrishna
- Nookala Chinna Satyanarayana
- Annavarapu Rama Swamy
- Chitti Babu
- Deerghasi Vizai Bhaskar
- Nidumolu Sumathi
- Yella Venkateswara Rao
- Dwaram Venkataswamy Naidu
- Kolanka Venkata Raju
- U. Srinivas
- Budaloor Krishnamurthy Shastri
- Prapancham Sitaram
- Puranam Purushottama Sastri
- Nedunuri Krishnamurthy
- Sripada Pinakapani
- Emani Sankara Sastry
- Sheik Chinna Moulana
- Domada Chittabbayi
- E. Gayathri
- Srimushnam V. Raja Rao
- A. Kanyakumari
- Dwaram Durga Prasad Rao
- V. Satyanarayana Sarma
- Ananta Charan Sai Babu
- Yamini Krishnamurthy
- Vempati Chinna Satyam
- Nataraja Ramakrishna
- Shobha Naidu
- Veernala Jayarama Rao
- Uma Rama Rao

== International Positions ==
United States

- Usha Vance – Second Lady of The United States of America.
- Ajay Naidu – Hollywood actor
- Arvind Krishna – Indian American business executive. He is the chief executive officer (CEO) of IBM
- Saagar Enjeti – independent political news commentator, based in Washington D.C.
- Adivi Sesh – Hollywood actor, director, writer
- Varun Sandesh – actor
- Surya Yalamanchili – Democratic nominee who ran for Congress in Ohio's 2nd congressional district in 2010
- Vinai Thummalapally – U.S. Ambassador to Belize
- Kris Kolluri – New Jersey Commissioner of Transportation
- C. R. Rao – mathematician, statistician
- Rao Remala – first Indian Employee at Microsoft
- Satya Nadella – CEO of Microsoft
- Shantanu Narayen – CEO of Adobe Systems
- Raj Reddy – recipient of Turing Award
- Padmasree Warrior – former chief executive officer of Nio Inc.
- Vijaya Lakshmi Emani (1958–2009) – social activist, posthumously awarded Presidential Citizens Medal
- Sarayu Rao – Hollywood Actress
- Aneesh Chaganty – Hollywood director
- Akash Vukoti – TV personality
- Narayana Kocherlakota – American economist and is the Lionel W. McKenzie Professor of Economics at the University of Rochester
- Upendra Chivukula – Democratic politician who currently serves as a Commissioner on the New Jersey Board of Public Utilities after serving more than 12 years in the New Jersey General Assembly, where he had been the Deputy Speaker
- Dabeeru C. Rao – Director of the Division of Biostatistics at Washington University School of Medicine
- Balamurali Ambati – American ophthalmologist, educator, and researcher. On May 19, 1995, he entered the Guinness Book of World Records as the world's youngest doctor
- Uma Pemmaraju – American anchor and host on the Fox News Channel cable network
- Vamsi Mootha – American physician-scientist and computational biologist of Indian descent
- G. S. Maddala – mathematician and economist best known for work in the field of Econometrics
- J. N. Reddy – professor and holder of the Oscar S. Wyatt Endowed Chair in Mechanical Engineering at Texas A&M University
- Neeli Bendapudi – President of University of Louisville
- Calyampudi Radhakrishna Rao – professor emeritus at Pennsylvania State University and research professor at the university at Buffalo
- Ravi V. Bellamkonda – Vinik Dean of Engineering Duke University Edmund T. Pratt Jr. School of Engineering
- Yellapragada Subbarao – Indian biochemist who discovered the function of adenosine triphosphate as an energy source in the cell
- Nina Davuluri – Miss America 2014
- Dattatreyudu Nori – Vice Chairman of the Radiation Oncologist Department at The New York-Presbyterian Hospital/Weill Cornell Medical College in New York City
- V. Mohan Reddy – pediatric cardiothoracic surgeon at Stanford
- E. Premkumar Reddy – oncologist; director of Fels institute of cancer research and molecular biology at Temple University
- Aruna Miller – American politician and former members of the Maryland House of delegates representing District 15 in Montgomery County, Maryland
- Laxmi Poruri – tennis player
- Raja Kumari – singer
- Mathukumalli Vidyasagar – control theorist
- Hari Kondabolu – stand-up comedian
- Ashok Kondabolu – DJ, rapper, former member of hip-hop group Das Racist
- Sashi Reddy – entrepreneur, venture capitalist, and philanthropist
- Raj Reddy – computer scientist, founder of the Robotics Institute at Carnegie Mellon University, winner of Turing Award
- Lakireddy Bali Reddy – convicted felon, charged for sex trafficking, visa fraud, and tax code violations
- Alluri Satyanarayana Raju – first General Secretary in AICC in Nehru Govt.
- Sekhar Puli – Indian American entrepreneur, Investor and philanthropist

South Africa

- Anand Naidoo – South African journalist
- Jailoshini Naidoo – South African actress
- Leeanda Reddy – South African actor

French Yanam

- Diwan Bouloussou Soubramaniam Sastroulou – (Ancien Membre du Conseil Local et Conseil Municipal de Yanaon, Ancien Jury De Yanaon, Former Diwan of Manyam Zamindari of French Yanam)
- Bezawada Bapa Naidou – (Ancien Maire De Yanaon)
- Kamichetty Venugopala Rao Naidou – (Ancien Maire De Yanaon)
- Kamichetty Sri Parasurama Varaprasada Rao Naidu – Former MLA of Yanam for six consecutive terms and Deputy Speaker, Speaker of Puducherry Legislative Assembly.
- Dadala Raphael Ramanayya – Freedom fighter
- Samatam Krishnayya – Poet and Pro-French Activist, Maire(interim) de Yanaon
- Malladi Krishna Rao – Puducherry Health Minister

== Modern writers ==
- Tirupati Venkata Kavulu
- Patanjali
- Tapi Dharma Rao Naidu
- Kandukuri Veeresalingam
- Gurazada Apparao
- Srirangam Srinivasa Rao
- Devulapalli Krishnasastri
- Garimella Satyanarayana
- Viswanatha Satyanarayana
- Chilakamarthi Lakshmi Narasimham
- Gudipati Venkatachalam
- Tripuraneni Ramaswamy
- Tummala Seetharama Murthy
- Dr. C. Naryana Reddy
- Dasaradhi
- Gurram Joshua
- Boyi Bheemanna
- Kodavatiganti Kutumbarao
- Mullapudi, Venkataramana
- Vasireddy Seethadevi
- Tripuraneni Gopichand
- Atluri Pitcheswara Rao
- Kaloji
- Suravaram Pratap Reddy
- Malladi Venkata Krishna Murthy
- Yandamuri Veerendranath
- Vegunta Mohan Prasad

== Industrialists and CEOs ==
- Satya Nadella – CEO, Microsoft
- Srini Raju – Founder TV9
- Mohan Reddy – Founder and Chairman Cyient
- PMS Prasad – CEO, Reliance Industries
- Grandhi Mallikarjuna Rao – GMR Group
- Gunapati Venkata Krishna Reddy – GVK Group
- Shantanu Narayen – CEO, Adobe Systems
- Anji Reddy – Dr. Reddy's Laboratories
- Prathap C. Reddy – Founder, Apollo Hospitals
- Vikram Akula – Founder, SKS Microfinance
- Sashi Reddi – Founder Sri Capital
- Ramachandra Naidu Galla – Founder, Amara Raja Group
- Padmasree Warrior – CEO, Cisco Systems
- Lagadapati Madhusudan Rao – Lanco Infra Founder, MD
- Narayana Kocherlakota – President of Federal Reserve Bank of Minneapolis
- Prasad Nimmagadda – Matrix Labs Founder, MD
- Varaprasad Reddy – Shanta Biotech Founder, MD
- AVS Raju – Founder, Nagarjuna Construction Company
- Nama Nageswara Rao – Founder, Madhucon Projects
- Ramoji Rao – Eenadu Group
- Mekapati Rajamohan Reddy – KMC Infra Founder, MD
- Srini Kopollu – Microsoft India
- Magunta Sreenivasulu Reddy – chairman, Balaji Group
- T. Subbarami Reddy – Founder of Gayatri Group of Companies
- Byrraju Ramalinga Raju – Founder of Satyam Computers
- Ramesh Gelli – Founder of Global Trust Bank and the only Banker to win Padmashree
- P. V. Ramprasad Reddy – Founder Aurabindo pharma
- Arvind Krishna – Chairman and CEO, IBM
- Vijaya Gadde – general counsel and the head of legal, policy Twitter

== Sports ==
Cricket

- C. K. Nayudu – First Captain of Indian Cricket Team
- Maharajkumar of Vizianagram alias Pusapati Vijay Ananda Gajapathi Raju, – Second Captain of Indian Cricket Team
- Buchi Babu Naidu – Father of South Indian Cricket
- Cotah Ramaswami – Represented India in both International Cricket and Tennis
- Hanuma Vihari – Indian test cricket team player
- M. Baliah Naidu – Cricketer
- M. Suryanarayan – Indian Test Cricketer
- M. S. K. Prasad – Cricketer
- M. L. Jaisimha – Cricketer
- Nitish Kumar Reddy – Cricketer
- Tilak Varma – Cricketer
- Shivlal Yadav – Cricketer
- K. S. Bharat – Cricketer
- Tarun Nethula – Cricketer
- Saiteja Mukkamalla – Cricketer
- Bharath Reddy – Test Cricketer (1978–1981)
- Venugopal Rao – Cricketer
- Ambati Rayudu – Cricketer
- Rohit Sharma – Cricketer
- Dinesh Karthik – Cricketer from Tamil Nadu
- Lakshmipathy Balaji – Cricketer from Tamil Nadu
- V. V. S. Laxman – Cricketer
- Venkatapathy Raju – Cricketer
- Bharat Arun – Cricketer
- Sandeep Goud – Cricketer
- M. V. Narasimha Rao – Cricketer
- M. Venkataramana – Cricketer
- Pochiah Krishnamurthy – Cricketer
- Sabbhineni Meghana – Women Cricketer
- Sravanthi Naidu – Women Cricketer
- Rajani Venugopal – Women Cricketer
- Sneha Deepthi – Women Cricketer
- Diana David – Women Cricketer
- Ravi Kalpana – Women Cricketer
- Purnima Rau – Women Cricketer
- Arundhati Reddy – Women Cricketer

Tennis

- Mahesh Bhupathi – First Indian to win a major tournament
- Saketh Myneni – He won a gold medal in Mixed doubles and a silver medal in Men's doubles event at Incheon Asian Games 2014
- Laxmi Poruri – the first Indian-American female to play professional tennis on the WTA Tour in the modern era
- Rushmi Chakravarthi – She won a record 52 ITF titles, the highest number set by an Indian female player
- Pranjala Yadlapalli – Pranjala has won four singles titles and six doubles titles on the ITF Women's Circuit
- Vishnu Vardhan – He won bronze medal in men's doubles at 2010 Asian games in Guangzhou, China. He paired-up with and Sania Mirza for mixed doubles and won silver medal at the same event
- Jafreen Shaik – She claimed a bronze medal in the mixed doubles at the 2017 Summer Deaflympics partnering with Prithvi Sekhar
- Sowjanya Bavisetti – Women Tennis player
- Rekha Boyalapalli – Women Tennis player
- Rishika Sunkara – Women Tennis player
- Vishal Punna – Tennis Player
- Bhanu Nunna – Tennis Player

Speedcubing

- Krishnam Raju Gadiraju – is an accomplished Indian speedcuber and unicyclist. He is a six-time world record holder and the first Indian to ever set a world record in speedcubing and unicycling.

Human Calculator

- Neelakantha Bhanu Prakash – is a human calculator from India, and is titled as the "World's Fastest Human Calculator". BBC said "Neelakantha Bhanu Prakash is to math (mental calculation) what Usain Bolt is to running".

Chess

- Koneru Humpy – Chess Grand Master, Arjuna Award winner
- Pendyala Harikrishna – Chess Grand Master, Arjuna Award winner
- Harika Dronavalli – Chess Grand Master, Arjuna Award winner
- Gukesh D – Chess Grand Master, World Chess Champion
- Bodda Pratyusha – Chess Grand Master
- Arjun Erigaisi – Chess Grand Master
- M. R. Lalith Babu – Chess Grand Master
- Harsha Bharathakoti – Chess Grand Master
- Karthik Venkataraman – Chess Grand Master
- Sahiti P. Lakshmi – Chess Woman International Master
- Nutakki Priyanka – Chess Woman International Master

Football

- Tulsidas Balaram – represented the country in international competitions including the Olympic Games
- K. Appalaraju – He scored a goal in a 2–0 win over South Korea in 1964 Asian Cup. He also scored a hat-trick in a 5–3 win over Sri Lanka in 1964 Summer Olympics Football tournament qualification
- Soumya Guguloth – Women Football player

Other Countries

- Vikash Dhorasoo – French international footballer, played for France in 2006 World Cup

Others

- Neelapu Rami Reddy – Sprinter and athletics champion
- K. Krishna Mohan – the first Indian to break the 14 second barrier in 110 metre hurdles
- Shamsher Khan – was an Indian swimmer who represented India in the 1956 Summer Olympics
- Anup Kumar Yama – Roller Skater
- Aruna Reddy – an Indian female artistic gymnast, representing at international competitions. She won bronze medal in 2018 World Cup Gymnastics in women's vault event in Melbourne. She created history by becoming the first Indian to clinch a medal at Gymnastics World Cup
- K. Srinivas – He was the Indian national carrom champion and the winner of the 4th Carrom World Cup held at the Maldives
- Ambati Prudhvi Reddy – Basketball player
- B. V. Satyanarayan – He competed in the men's long jump at the 1960 Summer Olympics and the 1964 Summer Olympics

Boxing

- Usha Nagisetty – She won the gold medal at the 2008 Asian Women Boxing Championships and the silver medal at the 2008 AIBA Women's World Boxing Championship.
- Mohammad Hussamuddin – Hussamuddin won a Bronze at the 2018 Commonwealth Games held at Gold Coast in Queensland, Australia
- Nikhat Zareen – She won gold medal at the 2022 IBA Women's World Boxing Championships.She has become the fifth Indian woman to win a gold medal at the IBA World Boxing Championships
- Bharadwaj Dayala – the first Indian to complete a solo tour around the world on an Indian-made Karizma motorcycle
- Sri Vyshnavi Yarlagadda – the first Indian to set a Junior World Record and also the first Indian woman to win a gold medal in World Junior Memory Championships.She is the youngest and the first woman in India to achieve the International Master of Memory title

Archery

- Pranitha Vardhineni – Pranitha Vardhineni represented India in the women's individual and team archery events at the 2008 Summer Olympics in Beijing
- Cherukuri Lenin – he won a silver medal at the Asian Grand Prix in Malaysia
- Jyothi Surekha Vennam – At the age of 13, she won an Olympic round gold medal at the Mexican Grand Prix. At the Mexican Grand Prix, she also won bronze (20m) and three silver (50m and 40m)
- Dhiraj Bommadevara
- Jayalakshmi Sarikonda – She competes in the compound women event. She won medals in international archery events

Volleyball

- A. Ramana Rao – He was the head coach for the Indian men's volleyball team at the Asian Men's Volleyball Championship at Perth in 1991. He was also the first Indian volleyball coach to qualify as FIVB Instructor in the German Democratic Republic in 1986
- Shyam Sunder Rao – former Indian volleyball player and coach.He is a recipient of Arjuna award and, in 1995, the Dronacharya award
- Yejju Subba Rao – He was the President of Volleyball Federation of India honored Y Subba Rao with Five Gold coins for his extraordinary contribution towards Indian volleyball
- P. V. Ramana – He was a member of the India men's national volleyball team. In the 1986 Asian Games, he was part of the team that won a bronze medal
- Tilakam Gopal – is a former volleyball player from India. He captained the India national team at the 1966 Asian Games

Handball

- Boyi Satya – is a handball player from Vijayawada.

Weight Lifting

- Karnam Malleswari – Olympic medalist in weight lifting
- Ragala Venkat Rahul – He won a gold medal in the men's 85 kg weight class at the 2018 Commonwealth Games in Gold Coast, Australia
- Valluri Srinivasa Rao – Weight lifter, winner of bronze medal in the 2010 Commonwealth Games in Delhi in the Men's 56 kg category
- Santoshi Matsa – She won the silver medal in the women's 53 kg weight class at the 2014 Commonwealth Games at Glasgow
- Shailaja Pujari – She won 3 Gold Medals in the women's 75 kg weight class at the 2002 Commonwealth Games Manchester
- Neelam Setti Laxmi – She won two silver medals at the 2002 Commonwealth Games
- Badathala Adisekhar – He competed in the 1992 and 1996 Summer Olympics
- Manikyalu Malla Venkata – He competed in the men's flyweight event at the 1984 Summer Olympics
- Kamineni Eswara Rao – He competed at the 1952 Summer Olympics and the 1956 Summer Olympics
- Dandamudi Rajagopal Rao – First Indian weightlifting champion continuously for 13 years from 1945 to 1958 popularly known as Indian Tarzan

Body Builders

- Kodi Rammurthy Naidu – Bodybuilder and wrestler
- Laxman Reddy – Body Building champion – Winner, Mr. World 2010
- Thota Narasayya Naidu – Professional Wrestler and Freedom fighter

Table tennis

- Sharath Kamal – The first Indian table tennis player ever to become ten times Senior National Champion
- Sreeja Akula – Table Tennis

Field Hockey

- Mukesh Kumar – represented his native country at three consecutive Summer Olympics. Triple Olympian and winner of Arjuna award-1995, Padmashri Award-2003
- Rajani Etimarpu – The first Women from Andhra pradesh to be part of the Indian women's hockey team and 2016 Rio Olympics
- Alloysius Edwards – Olympian Atlanta and Sydney Olympics 1996

Badminton

- P. V. Sindhu – India's first female multi-medallist in Olympics with silver and bronze and five World Championship medals.
- Chetan Anand – Badminton champion
- Pullela Gopichand – 2002 All England Shuttle Badminton champion
- P. V. V. Lakshmi – Badminton player
- Gayatri Gopichand – Badminton doubles player; Commonwealth Games medallist
- Jwala Gutta – Badminton champion
- Parupalli Kashyap – Badminton Player
- Gurusai Dutt – Badminton Player
- Satwiksairaj Rankireddy – Badminton doubles player; Asian Games gold medalist
- S. M. Arif – Former player and coach, He is a recipient of Dronacharya Award and Padma Shri Award
- Ruthvika Gadde – Badminton Player
- N. Sikki Reddy – Badminton Player
- Srikanth Kidambi – Badminton player
- B. Sai Praneeth – Badminton player
- B. Sumeeth Reddy – Badminton player
- Harika Veludurthi – Badminton player
- Nandagopal Kidambi – Badminton player
- K. Maneesha – Badminton player
- Srivedya Gurazada – Badminton player
- Meghana Jakkampudi – Badminton player
- Deepthi Chapala – Badminton player
- K. Neelima Chowdary – Badminton player
- Tarun Kona – Badminton player
- Shikha Gautam – Badminton player
- Siril Verma – Badminton player
- Sudheer Babu – Badminton player

Racing

- Narain Karthikeyan – India's first Formula 1 driver
- S. Karivardhan – car constructor and National Champion
- Anindith Reddy – National Champion Driver in the 2016 Euro JK 16, JK 17 Championship

Mountain climbing

- Malavath Purna – Youngest female to climb Mount Everest
- Malli Mastan Babu – World record of climbing the Seven Summits in the shortest span of time at that point

== Films ==
Actors

- Adivi Sesh – Actor
- Dr. Akkineni Nageswara Rao – Film actor and Studio owner
- Ali – Film Actor
- Allu Rama Lingaiah – Actor/Comedian
- Allari Naresh – Film Actor
- Allu Arjun – Actor/dancer
- Aryan Rajesh – Film Actor
- Padmanabham – Film Actor, Producer
- Babu Mohan – Standup comedian
- Brahmanandam – Actor, Guinness record holder for acting more than 700 films
- Chalam – Actor and Producer
- Chiranjeevi – Telugu actor and philanthropist
- V. Nagayya – Actor
- Venkatesh – Telugu film actor
- Dasari Narayana Rao – Telugu director, actor and producer
- Eelapata Raghuramaiah – Telugu Film and Stage Actor, Padmasri Award Winner, Kendra Sangeeta Nataka Akademy Award Winner
- Gummadi – Telugu film actor
- Hari Kondabolu – Standup comedian
- Jagapati Babu – Film Actor
- Jayam Ravi – Tamil film actor; (Telugu mother)
- J. D. Chakravarthy – Film Actor
- Jaya Prakash Reddy – Actor
- Johny Lever – Film Actor/Stand-up Comedian
- Kaikala Satyanarayana – Actor and producer
- Kanta Rao – Film Actor
- Krishnam Raju – Film Actor
- Krishna (Telugu actor) – Film Actor/Studio owner
- Kota Srinivasa Rao – Film Actor
- Mahesh Babu – Film Actor, Philanthropist
- Mahat Raghavendra -Film Actor
- Meka Srikanth – Film Actor
- M. Prabhakar Reddy – Actor
- Manchu Manoj – Film Actor
- Maganti Murali Mohan – Film Actor/Producer
- M.S. Narayana – Film Actor
- Nani – Actor
- Napoleon – Film Actor
- Nandamuri Balakrishna – Film Actor
- Nandamuri Harikrishna – Film Actor
- Nagarjuna – Film actor/producer/studio owner
- Nagendra Babu – Actor/producer
- Nani (actor) – Film actor
- Naveen Polishetty – Telugu actor
- Naveen Chandra – Telugu and Tamil actor
- Nitin Kumar Reddy – Film Actor
- N.T. Rama Rao – Film Actor, Former Chief Minister of Andhra Pradesh
- N. T. Rama Rao Jr. – Actor/Singer
- Nandamuri Kalyan Ram – Film Actor/Producer
- Pawan Kalyan – Telugu actor, Jana Sena Party President
- Prabhas – Film Actor
- Raghupathi Venkaiah Naidu – Father of Telugu cinema
- Rami Reddy – Actor
- Rallapalli
- Relangi – Film Actor and Singer
- Ramana Reddy – Comedian
- Rajanala – Actor
- Rajiv Kanakala – Actor
- Ram – Film actor
- Ravi Krishna – Actor
- Rao Gopal Rao – Film Actor
- Ram Charan Teja – Actor
- Rajendra Prasad – Film Actor
- Raviteja – Film Actor
- Sunil – Film Actor
- Srihari – Actor/producer
- Sobhan Babu – Film Actor
- Sudheer Varma – Actor
- Suthi Veerabhadra Rao – Actor
- Suthi Velu – Actor
- Tanikella Bharani – Dialogue Writer/Actor
- Tarun – Film Actor
- Uday Kiran – Film Actor
- Vaibhav Reddy – Actor
- Vijay Deverakonda – Actor
- Vishnu Vardhan Babu – Film Actor
- Vishal – Tamil Film Actor

Actresses

- Aditi Rao Hydari – Telugu, Hindi and Tamil actress (Telugu mother)
- Aishwarya Rajesh – Tamil and Telugu actress
- Anandhi – works in Telugu and Tamil films
- Annapoorna – Telugu actress
- Anjali – Tamil and Telugu film actress
- Bhanupriya – Actress
- Bindu Madhavi Reddy – actress
- Bhanumathi Ramakrishna – Telugu, Tamil actress/producer
- Devika – Telugu and Tamil actress
- Eesha Rebba – Telugu actress
- Fatafat Jayalaxmi – Telugu actress in Telugu, Tamil, Malayalam, and Kannada films
- Gautami – Famous actress of the 1980s and 1990s who worked in Tamil, Telugu and Malayalam films
- G. Varalakshmi – actress
- Jayasudha – Film actress
- Jaya Prada – Film actress
- Jamuna – Telugu actress
- Kanchana – 1950s, 1960s and 1970s actress who acted in Tamil, Telugu and Kannada films
- Kiran Rao – Indian film producer and ex-wife of Bollywood actor Aamir Khan
- Krishnaveni – Actress, singer, producer
- Krishna Kumari – Telugu actress
- Keerthi Reddy – Actress
- Lakshmi – Telugu and Tamil actress (Telugu father)
- Lakshmi Manchu – Telugu actress
- Laya – Film Actress
- Malashri – Kannada actress
- P. Kannamba – Telugu, Tamil actress/producer
- Priya Anand – Tamil and Hindi actress (Telugu mother)
- Rambha – Actress
- Ramya Krishna – Actress. (Telugu father)
- Rohini (actress) – Actress
- Roja Selvamani – Actress
- Roopa Koduvayur – Actress
- Rekha – Mother is Telugu actress Pushpavalli
- Sarayu Rao – American actress
- Samantha – Telugu and Tamil actress
- Sameera Reddy – Actress (Telugu father)
- Santha Kumari – Telugu, Tamil actress/producer
- Savitri – Telugu, Tamil actress/producer
- Sarada – Film actress
- Silk Smitha – actress in South Indian film industry
- Sneha – Actress
- Sowkar Janaki – Telugu, Tamil actress
- Sobhita Dhulipala – Telugu, Hindi actress
- Sridevi – Indian actress (Telugu family from Tamil Nadu)
- Sri Divya – Telugu film actress
- S. Varalakshmi – Telugu, Tamil actress
- Shreya Dhanwanthary – Hindi, Telugu actress
- Swara Bhaskar – Film actress. (Telugu father)
- Swati Reddy – Film actress/television presenter
- Tina Desai – Telugu mother and Gujarati father
- Vijayashanti – Actress and politician
- Vanisri – Telugu and Kannada actress

Producers, Writer and Directors

- E. V. V. Satyanarayana – Film Director
- G. Neelakanta Reddy – Film Director
- S. Gopal Reddy – Cinematographer, Producer
- Ananth Sreeram – Lyricist
- Moola Narayana Swamy – Producer
- P. Pullayya – Producer
- Shyam Prasad Reddy – Film Producer
- D.V. Narasa Raju – Writer and Film Director
- Nandamuri Taraka Rama Rao – Film Actor/Director
- Vidyasagar – Music director
- Gopichand Lagadapati – Actor/Director/Writer/Producer
- Malladi Venkata Krishna Murthy – Writer
- H. M. Reddy – First Telugu, first Tamil & first Kannada film director
- B. N. Reddy – Legendary director & producer, Dadasaheb phalke winner
- Ramesh Naidu – Music director
- B. Nagireddy – Legendary director & producer, Dadasaheb phalke winner
- Moola Narayana Swamy – Vauhini Studios owner and producer
- Nandini Reddy – Film Director
- Sameer Reddy – Cinematographer
- Midde Rama Rao – Film Producer
- Katta Subba Rao – Telugu Film Director
- K. Viswanath – One of India's most famous directors
- Akkineni L. V. Prasad – Producer/Director
- Edida Nageswara Rao – Producer
- Allu Aravind – Producer
- A.M. Rathnam – Producer
- Sekhar Kammula – Director/producer
- Nagesh Kukunoor – Director/producer
- V. V. Vinayak – Director
- Krishna Vamsi – Director
- Sukumar – Director
- Bapu – Artist/Film Director
- Adurthi Subba Rao – Film Producer/Director
- D. Ramanaidu – Film Producer/Studio owner
- A. Kodandarami Reddy – Film Director
- Kovelamudi Raghavendra Rao – Director/Producer
- Kodi Ramakrishna – Director
- Paruchuri Brothers – Writers
- S. V. Krishna Reddy – Film Director
- Jandhyala – Film Director
- Yandamuri Veerendranath – Writer/Director
- Vamsy – Film Director
- Pingali Nagendrarao – Poet and Lyricist
- Chota K. Naidu – Cinematographer
- Shyam K. Naidu – Cinematographer
- Devi Sri Prasad – Music Director
- Surender Reddy – Film Director
- S. S. Rajamouli – Film Director
- Prashanth Neel – Kannada and Telugu film director from Karnataka
- Samudrala Sr. – Poet and Lyricist
- Samudrala Jr. – Poet and Lyricist
- Selvaraghavan – Tamil Film Director
- Acharya Aatreya – Poet and Lyricist
- Aarudhra – Poet and Lyricist
- Kosaraju Raghavayya – Poet and Lyricist
- Daasarathi Krishnamacharyulu – Poet and Lyricist
- Veturi – Poet and Lyricist
- Jaladi – Poet and Lyricist
- Rajasri – Poet and Lyricist
- Vennelakanti – Poet and Lyricist
- Sirivennela Sitaramasastri – Poet and Lyricist
- Bhuvana Chandra – Poet and Lyricist
- C. Aswani Dutt – Film Producer
- Dil Raju – Film Producer
- K.S. Rama Rao – Film Producer
- Ram Gopal Varma – Film Producer/Director
- M.M. Keeravani – Music Director
- Aneesh Chaganty – Hollywood Film director
- Mani Sharma – Music Director
- M. S. Raju – Film Producer
- A. Sreekar Prasad – Film Editor
- Puri Jagannadh – Film Director
- Trivikram Srinivas – Dialogue Writer/Film Director

Singers

- Ghantasala – Legendary Singer and music Composer.
- S.P. Balasubrahmanyam – Singer, Guinness record holder having sung most songs by any male
- S. Janaki – a legendary South Indian playback singer
- P. Susheela – a legendary South Indian playback singer
- S.P. Sailaja – Singer
- Mano – Singer
- Madhavapeddi Satyam – Singer

== Artists ==
- Pakhal Tirumal Reddy – Artist
- Krishna Reddy – Printmaker and sculptor
- Laxma Goud
- Damerla Rama Rao
- Vempati Chinna Satyam – Exponent of Kuchipudi dance
- Raja and Radha Reddy – Kuchipudi dancers
- Shobha Naidu – Kuchipudi dancer
- Yamini Reddy – Kuchipudi dancer
- Eelapata Raghuramaiah – Stage and Cine Actor of Andhra Pradesh
- Adivi Baapiraju

== Musicians and Composers ==
- Thaman S
- Devi Sri Prasad
- Tyagaraja
- Shyama Shastri
- Tallapaka Annamacharya
- Bhadrachala Ramadasu
- Kshetrayya
- Aadibhotla Narayana Das
- Ghantasala Venkateswara Rao
- M. Balamuralikrishna
- P. Suseela
- S. Janaki
- S. P. Balasubrahmanyam
- P. B. Sreenivas
- Nagoor Babu
- Dwaram Venkataswamy Naidu
- Rakesh Yankaran – Indo-Trinidadian singer from Trinidad and Tobago
- U. Srinivas – He is popularly known as Mandolin Srinivas.
- U. Rajesh – He is popularly known as Mandolin Rajesh.

== Journalists ==
- Kasinadhuni Nageswara Rao – journalist of early twentieth century and father of the library movement in Andhra, Founder of Andhra patrika
- N. Subba Rao Pantulu and D.Kesava Rao pantulu (Co Founders of The Hindu)
- Patanjali – ex-chief editor, Sakshi
- G. K. Reddy – Journalist
- Suravaram Pratapareddy – Founder of Golconda Patrika, a journal in Hyderabad State
- Palagummi Sainath – Rural India Affairs Reporter, The Hindu
- Puripanda Appala Swamy.
- Panchajanya - Founder, Mahanagar Dinapatrika
- Nadimpalli Seetharamaraju – Journalist
- Pasam Jagannadham Naidu

== Polymaths ==
- Adivi Baapiraju
- Pavuluru Mallanna
- Lakkoju Sanjeevaraya Sharma

== See also ==
- List of Telugu poets
