= Aluri =

Aluri is a Telegu surname. People with the name include:

- Chakrapani (director) (Aluri Venkata Subbarao, 1908–1975), Indian screenwriter, producer and director in Telugu cinema
- Aluri Bairagi, a Telugu poet
