= Dalavai Chalapathi Rao =

Indian artist

- Born: Anantapur district, India
- Occupation: Puppet artisan
- Awards: National award, 1988; Padma Shri award, 2020

Dalavai Chalapathi Rao is a leather puppet artisan from Anantapur district, India. He received the Padma Shri award in 2020 for his efforts in leather puppet art.

== Early life and background ==
Dalavai Chalapathi Rao was born in 1936. He started his journey in puppet-making at the age of 13 as this art is mostly a family affair. He had learned the art from his father Khade Rao and for 40 years gave several shows, mostly on mythological themes. Later he underwent formal training in the craft.

== Personal life ==
He lives in Nimmalakunta village of Dharmavaram mandal. In 1988 he received a national award for his art and in 2016 he received the Kala Ratna.

== Awards ==
- 1988: National award in 1988.
- 2020: Padma Shri award in 2020 for his efforts in leather puppet art.
