= Deerghasi Vizai Bhaskar =

Telugu playwright, poet, writer, bureaucrat

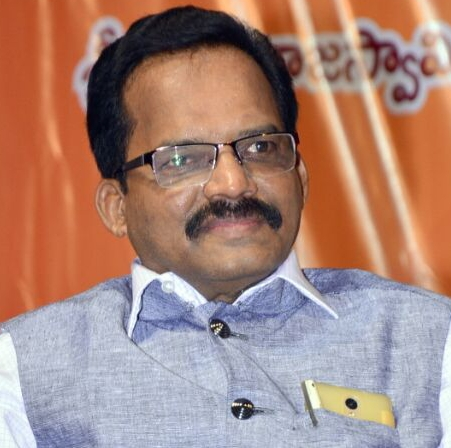
- Vizai Bhaskar Deerghasi
- Born: 1958 (age 67–68); Ampolu, Srikakulam district, Andhra Pradesh
- Other name: Vijaya Bhaskar
- Occupations: former Director, Culture Department, Government of Andhra Pradesh
- Years active: 1982-present
- Known for: Theater arts, playwright

Dr. Deerghasi Vizai Bhaskar, born in 1958 in Ampolu village, Srikakulam district, Andhra Pradesh, hails from a poor family. He began writing dramas at the age of twenty-two, with his debut play Turpu Tellanrindi, which depicted the struggles of weavers. Though he initially started his literary career writing short stories, on the advice of Kalipatnam Master, he transitioned to playwriting under the guidance of S.K. Misro, a veteran stage director. His passion for theater led him to pursue academic research in the field, culminating in a thesis on Bertolt Brecht's influence on Telugu drama.

== Literature ==
Dr. D. Vizai Bhaskar imbibed a spirit of democratic struggle against social and political oppression rooted in caste, demography, and the political system. He draws his themes from the agony of human suffering prevalent in rural society. Often, he employs mythopoeic and folkloric concepts to awaken rural communities, as their cultural foundations are deeply rooted in the perceptions of the past. Bhaskar also utilizes a powerful sense of humor, with shades of satire, to inspire and provoke people towards the effective realization of their goals. He views drama and theater as powerful tools for social change.

His sense of social commitment and responsibility has earned him several awards, including six Nandi Awards at the state level for best playwriting and the prestigious Central Sangeet Natak Puraskar in 2010. Many of his plays have been translated into several Indian languages, including Kannada, Tamil, Hindi, Gujarati, Bengali, Manipuri, Malayalam, and English, and have received equal appreciation and acclaim from diverse audiences. It is no exaggeration to say that he has emerged as a powerful pan-Indian playwright of recent times.

== Dramas and other Literary Works ==
Philosophical & Spiritual Writings

1. Srushti Garbha (A poetic interpretation of 12 Upanishads in 850 poems)

Dramas

1	Sri Ayodhya Rama (A Ballad on Rama Janma Bhumi)	18	Meere Devullu
2	Ruthwik	19	Chitram
3	Bommalu Cheppina Bhajagovindam	20	Mabbullo Bomma
4	Kinchitbhogam	21	Devudu Kaavaali
5	Hiranyagarbha	22	Baapu cheppina maata
6	Gandhi Jayanthi	23	Gruhapravesam
7	Kurchee	24	Toorpu Tellaarindi
8	Puliswari	25	Vontari Rekkalu
9	Kaalakootam	26	Raji Gaadu-Raaju Ayyadu
10	Jeevannatakam	27	Gaali Batukulu
11	Kabeerdas	28	Yamini Purnathilaka
12	Yogi Vemana	29	Suravaram Prathapa Reddy
13	Mahatma Jyotirao Phule	30	Suravaram Prathapa Reddy
14	Shramanakam	31	Kotval Raja Bahadhur
15	Shatruvu	32	Mahaapurushudu Madali
16	Brahmaraatha	33	Thimira Jwaala
17	Minister	34	Viplawa Jyoti bahujana Veerudu Panduga Saayanna

Poetry

1. Mahaa Sunyam
2. Vamsadhra
3. Mounamtho Maatalu
4. Vijaya Sathakam
5. Vruddhaarchana

Short Stories

1. Municipal Stories (Anthology)

Novels

1. Veerakalingam
2. Dhammali

Research Work

1. Ph.D. Thesis: Concept of Brecht’s Epic Theatre: Its Influence on Telugu Drama

== Recognition ==
Vizai Bhaskar's dramas were adopted by the Karnataka Nataka Akademi in 2010 to be performed on stage as part of a Kannada-Telugu theater collaboration. In an interview with The Hindu, Bhaskar mentioned that his play Gandhi Jayanthi was translated into seven languages, in addition to English, and that his drama Puli Swari was staged 150 times.

=== Awards ===
1. Nandi Awards : Best Writer Award for the years 1999, 2000, 2003, 2004, 2005, 2009, and 2011
2. Sri Potti Sreeramulu Telugu University Award in 2004
3. Sangeet Natak Akademi Award for Best Playwright in 2010
4. Delhi Telugu Akademi Award for Excellence in Telugu Literature in 2011
5. Gurajada Sahitee Puraskaram in 2012, conferred by the Government of Andhra Pradesh
