= Puranam Purushottama Sastri =

- Born: 1925
- Died: 2010 (aged 84–85)
- Genres: Carnatic music
- Occupation: Vocalist

Puranam Purushottama Sastri (1925–2010) was an eminent Carnatic musician and winner of Sangeet Natak Akademi Award.

He is son of Puranam Kanakayya Sastri. He was born in Nallapadu in Guntur district in 1925. His father Kanakayya Sastri was also famous musician and Asthana Vidwan of Gadwal Samsthanam and Yadagirigutta Devasthanam. He went to Madras to pursue advanced music. He took diploma in Music from Central College of Carnatic Music in 1952. Musiri Subramania Iyer was the principal and also his guru for a decade.

At home, he became known for his rich vocal compass, manodharma, laya gnanam and gamaka pushti. Sastry was an undisputed expert in singing Pallavi. He has also applied ragas to cure some diseases and to activate clouds for rain in prolonged drought.

He died in February 2010.

== Awards ==
- He has won the Sangeet Natak Akademi Award in Carnatic Vocal category in 2008.
- Government of Andhra Pradesh presented him the Hamsa Award for the year 2003.
