= V. Koteswaramma =

Indian educator, Padma Shri awardee

- Born: 15 September 1925 (age 100)
- Died: 2019
- Education: Andhra Christian College, Nagarjuna University
- Occupations: Educator, writer
- Notable work: Over 50 books, essays, poems
- Children: Davuluri Sheela Ranjani
- Awards: Telugu Sahitya Akademi Award

V. Koteswaramma (15 September 1925 - 2019) was an educator and teacher from Andhra Pradesh. She is the founder of Children’s Montessori School in Vijayawada, Andhra Pradesh and the group of Montessori Educational institutions.

== Early life and education ==
Koteswaramma was to in Gosala village, Kankipadu, Krishna district. Both her parents were teachers. She was the first woman graduate in Vijayawada taluka in 1945. She graduated from Andhra Christian College, Guntur, and later did a B.Ed. and aspired to take up teaching as a profession. She then did her M.A. in Telugu literature in 1972 and was awarded a Ph.D. in 1980 by the Nagarjuna University. She has a daughter, Davuluri Sheela Ranjani.

== Career ==
Koteswaramma started as a government teacher at the Government Zilla Parishad School in Patamata, a suburban area near Vijayawada. In 1955, she was offered a chance to start a nursery for 20 children, and she took it up. In 1973, she started Montessori Junior and Degree Colleges. In 1984, she added the Montessori College of Education to the group of institutions.

=== Writer ===
She wrote more than 50 books, besides essays and poems. She was also Telugu Sahitya Akademi winner. She ran a monthly named, 'Illu Illalu' (The home and the homemaker) for 39 years.

== Awards ==
- In 1971, she got the National Award for Teachers.
- In 1980, she got Andhra Pradesh state's Best Teacher Award.
- In 2017, she received Padma Shri in the Education and Literature category.
