= PMS Prasad =

Indian engineer and business manager

- Born: 11 February 1952 (age 74); Tenali, Andhra Pradesh, India
- Occupations: ED, Reliance Industries

Panda Madhusudana Siva Prasad is an engineer by profession and is the present Executive Director of Reliance Industries. He is the senior most individual in the Reliance Industries day-to-day operations corporate organizational chart excluding Chairman Mukesh Ambani. PMS Prasad has also served as the Chief Executive Officer of Reliance Petroleum Limited.

== Early life ==
PMS Prasad was born in Tenali in Andhra Pradesh, India. He was born in an upper-middle-class family. He soon joined Reliance Industries while it was being run by Dhirubhai Ambani. PMS Prasad soon became a trusted lieutenant of the Reliance senior management and was promoted to CEO by Mukesh Ambani.

== Career ==
Prasad led a team that set up Reliance's Jamnagar Refinery complex in 1999, the world's largest refinery. Currently Prasad is spearheading Reliance Jio's service rollout plans.
