= P. V. Ramprasad Reddy =

Indian businessman and co-founder of Aurobindo Pharma

- Known for: Co-founder Aurobindo Pharma

P.V. Ramprasad Reddy is an Indian businessman and co-founder of Aurobindo Pharma. On the 2016 Forbes list of Indian billionaires, he was ranked No. 27 in India and No. 688 in world with a net worth of US$2.5 billion. The World Pharmaceutical Frontiers announced him one of the top thirty five influential people in the industry of pharmaceutical in 2008.

As per Forbes list of India’s 100 richest tycoons, dated OCTOBER 09, 2024, P.V. Ramprasad Reddy is ranked 82nd with a net worth of $3.9 Billion.

== See also ==
- Forbes list of Indian billionaires
