= NewsPlus =

- Company type: Private
- Headquarters: Singapore, Hyderabad
- Area served: India, Southeast Asia, United States
- Founders: Srini Koppolu; Vasudeva Varma
- CEO: Srini Koppolu
- Launched: August 2015
- Current status: active

NewsPlus is a news aggregator company based in Singapore and Hyderabad. It aggregates content from news sites, social media and blogs. The service can be accessed via web browser, or via mobile apps for iOS, Android.

== Languages and Countries ==
NewsPlus is localized into 10 languages.

NewsPlus brings news for India, United States, Philippines, Indonesia, Thailand, Malaysia, Pakistan, South Africa, and the local news for all major cities and towns.

== History ==
NewsPlus app was originally launched under name of Veooz in August 2015 Since then product evolved significantly, with support for additional languages, and addition features like, magazines, direct sharing, social features.
