= Rekha Boyalapalli =

Indian tennis player

- Full name: Rekha Boyalapalli
- Country (sports): India
- Residence: Hyderabad
- Born: 5 April 1986 (age 39); Hyderabad, India
- Plays: Right-handed
- Prize money: US$ 147

Singles
- Career record: 0–3
- Career titles: 3 ITF

Team competitions
- Last updated on: 05 October 2020.

Rekha Boyalapalli (born 5 April 1986) is an Indian tennis player.

== Biography ==
Rekha Boyalapalli Alias Dr Rekha Goud after learning the basics of Tennis in Hyderabad and later in Mumbai. She attended an intensive training camp in Spain and began participating in AITA tournaments from 2017.

She participated in International Tennis Federation (ITF) tournaments in Thailand in November 2018 and Egypt in May 2019.

She emerged singles champion in the national ranking tournament conducted by Pradhan Tennis Academy besides being semi-finalist four times in AITA tournaments. As a tennis player in November 2018 she stood No 54 in the All India Tennis Association (AITA) rankings.

In the year 2020 during the COVID-19 pandemic, she was running charity to help the needy with food.

== ITF Circuit Finals ==
Legend
$15,000 tournaments
$10,000 tournaments

=== Singles: 3 (0 titles, 3 runner–ups) ===
Result	W–L	Date	Tournament	Tier	Surface	Opponent	Score
Loss	0–2	May 2019	ITF women, Cairo, Egypt	15,000	Clay	(Romania) Izabela Gabriela Novac	6-1, 6-0
Loss	0–2	Apr 2019	ITF women, Cairo, Egypt	15,000	Clay	(Egypt) Hla El-Sakka	6-0, 6-0
Loss	0–2	Nov 2018	ITF women, Hua Hin, Thailand	15,000	Hard	(Australia) Madison Frahn	6-0, 6-0
