= Nadimpalli Seetharamaraju =

Telugu language journalist

- Occupation: Journalist

Nadimpalli Seetharamaraju is a Telugu language journalist. He appears on all major Telugu news channels for his political and policy analysis.
