= Bnim =

Indian writer and cartoonist (born 1957)

- Born: Bhamidipally Narasimha Murthy; 28 October 1957 (age 68); Atreyapuram, Andhra Pradesh, India
- Occupations: Writer; cartoonist
- Writing career
- Pen name: Bnim; Neelapriya
- Language: Telugu
- Notable awards: Kala Ratna; Nandi Awards

Bhamidipally Narasimha Murthy (born 28 October 1957), commonly known by his mononymous pen name Bnim, is an Indian writer and cartoonist from the state of Andhra Pradesh. He received the Kala Ratna award and four Nandi Awards.

== Early life ==
Bnim was born on 28 October 1957 to Bhamidipally Suryanarayana Murthy and Vijaya Lakshmi in Atreyapuram, East Godavari district (now in Konaseema district), Andhra Pradesh. He grew up in Atreyapuram before moving to Hyderabad in 1981. He is an Ayurvedic doctor; however, he does not practice medicine. He has a brother.

== Writing career ==
Bnim started writing in 1975. His cartoons were initially published in Prabhava, a monthly publication. After moving to Hyderabad, he started working at Vikas Advertiser for his livelihood. He subsequently worked with Andhra Bhoomi, Krishna Patrika and Suprabhatam publications in pursuit of learning arts. He debuted working in television with Doordarshan during 1985–86 with his cartoon Adugu Puli. As of March 2019, Bnim worked in 30 television shows and 60 single episodes in various departments – editing, dubbing, designing and modulation. He has also written several television show titles on comedy, historical, mythological and social concepts.

He states he has used at least 26 pen names for his works, including Bnim and Neelapriya, which he used for poetry. According to him, he chose the pen name Bnim reflecting his initials "BNM" with "I" reflecting himself. His writing works are published in Andhra Bhoomi, Swathi, Chinuku magazines.

== Kuchipudi ballets ==
In 1990s, he started writing scripts for Kuchipudi ballets. He debuted with the ballet Madhura Swapna for Pedilka Narsingh Rao based on the life of Rabindranath Tagore. He has scripted five different ballets on Ramayana from various perspectives, some from the eyes of Ravana, Mandhara and Shabari. As of March 2019, he has scripted 254 ballets.

He contributed scripts for Maddali Usha Gayatri ballets – Matru Devo Bhava, Goda Kalyanam, Pushkara Pulakita Godavari, Swetcha Bharat. Other ballets include a composition on Shurpanakha for Sreelakshmy Govardhanan in her ballet Ardhanareeswaram; Katha Kelika, Meenakshi Kalyanam, Prakrithi Rakshathi Rakshithaha for Deepika Reddy, Sabari Gireesha Saranam, Lalitha Sindhuri, Kali Mardhanam, Rama Katha Saram, Vatsayani Kamasutra for Swathi Somnath based on Vātsyāyana's work on erotic love Kama Sutra.

== Reception ==
Gudipoodi Srihari of The Hindu opined that the scripting by Bnim for Goda Kalyanam, which portrays the Hindu deities Ranganatha, a form of Vishnu, and Goda Devi, was unique and creative compared to other exponents of Kuchipudi. Srihari wrote that Bnim, in contrast to common practice, took inspiration from the Hindu gods Rama and Krishna, both of whom are avatars of Vishnu.

== Films ==
Bnim scripted a song in the Telugu-language movie Yamudu Anna Ki Mogudu, which was well received. However, he did not pursue a further career in film.

== Other work ==
Bnim established Bapu-Ramana Academy – in memory of Bapu and Mullapudi Venkata Ramana – and gives out the Bapu Award to one cartoonist and the Ramana Award to one writer every year. He has also worked as an advisor at Akshagna Publication.

== Awards ==
Bnim was conferred with the Kala Ratna award by the Government of Andhra Pradesh. He has also received four Nandi Awards for his works in television for his contributions to screenplay, story and dialogues.
