= Maddali Usha Gayatri =

Indian Kuchipudi exponent (born 1955)

- Born: Mallavarapu Usha Gayatri; 26 April 1955 (age 71); Kurnool, Andhra State, India
- Education: Master of Arts, Hyderabad Central University; Doctorate, Potti Sreeramulu Telugu University
- Occupation: Kuchipudi dancer
- Children: 1
- Awards: Hamsa Award; Sangeet Natak Akademi Award

Maddali Usha Gayatri (née Mallavarapu, born 26 April 1955) is an Indian Kuchipudi exponent, danseuse, guru and choreographer from the state of Andhra Pradesh. A recipient of Hamsa Award (now called Kala Ratna) and Sangeet Natak Akademi Award, she received critical acclaim for her choreography and performances. She performs ballets in mythological, historical and social themes. One of her works, Nrityam Darsayami, included a troupe of 12 of her disciples performing for 12 hours uninterruptedly.

== Early life and education ==
Usha Gayatri was born on 26 April 1955 to Mallavarapu Sundaresam and Janakamma in Kurnool, Andhra State (now in Andhra Pradesh). has a sister, Uma Gayatri, who is a musician. She completed her Master of Arts from Hyderabad Central University in 1988. Later she researched and published her thesis on the role of Satyabhama, second queen-consort of Hindu god Krishna, in the growth of Telugu literature, development and incarnation in dance from Potti Sreeramulu Telugu University.

== Training in dance ==
Gayatri started her dance training, when she was 4 years old, from Sri Dayal Saran. Despite being trained in Kathak, Odissi and music, her interests turned towards Kuchipudi. She subsequently learned Kuchipudi from her guru, Vedantam Jagannath Sarma, at his dance institute Kuchipudi Kalakshetra in Hyderabad. She also trained in Yakshagana, a theatre form, from V. Satyanarayana Sarma, Vempati Chinna Satyam and Vedantam Prahlada Sarma and learned nattuvangam (the art of conducting a performance with rhythmic music using two cymbals) from Kamalarani.

== Career ==
In June 2010, Gayatri choreographed a ballet Alamelu Manga Charitham on the narrative of Hindu goddess Alamelu Manga, consort of Venkateswara, and Alamelu Mangapuram. While the performances were well received, the mythological ballet was criticized for deviating from the sthala purana, the religious account of a Hindu temple, of Venkateswara Temple in Tirumala. Later in July, she performed Rukmini-Satya, a ballet incorporating the characters of Rukmini and Satyabhama, first and second queen-consorts of Krishna, together and performed both the roles. She developed Rukmini's part of the play based on Pothana Bhagavatham and Sri Krishna Leela Tarangini; and used Siddhendra Yogi's Bhamakalapam for Satyabhama. She was praised for her performance and comprising two different characterizations in a single ballet.

In March 2011, she presented the ballet Matru Devo Bhava in which she played the mythological motherly roles of Parvati, Leelavati, Sita, Yashoda and Vakula Devi. Scripted by Bnim, she received commendation for her performance and choreography. In August, she performed Kunti Vilapam, an account of the life of Kunti, mother of the Pandavas in ancient Hindu epic Mahabharata, based on the writings of Jandhyala Papayya Sastry. She received praise for her performance and the composition of the ballet.

Later in June 2013, she performed a ballet under the title Shodasa Krishnam showcasing the adventures of Krishna which she composed from various works, including that of Annamacharya. She was praised for her choreography and performance in various characters in divergent themes. In July 2015, marking the 30th anniversary of her dance academy, Nritya Kinnera, she choreographed two ballets – Pushkara Pulakita Godavari and Amrapali. Pushkara Pulakita Godavari, scripted by Bnim, is themed around the Pushkaram of the Godavari River in which she played the role of Hindu deity Brihaspati, while in Amrapali, she played the role of The Buddha.

In May 2016, Gayatri released a book titled Kuchipudi Art and Satyabhama describing Satyabhama and choreographed a ballet based on Bhamakalapam. She instated excerpts from other poets on the literature surrounding Satyabhama in her play, including the scores of Narayana Teertha, Nandi Thimmana and Tarigonda Vengamamba. She received critical acclaim for her performance and choreography. Later that year during June–July, she toured across Europe in a group of 40 Kuchipudi exponents and folk artists and performed in several ballets. In February 2017, she performed a ballet Swetcha Bharat (transl. Independent India) narrating the story of Indian history from Vedic period until the Indian independence movement. Scripted by Bnim, she took upon the role of Bharat Mata, the national personification of India as a mother goddess, for which she received acclaim.

She also performs ballets on historical themes and social values. As of January 2018, she choreographed more than 200 ballets, some of which include Alokaye Sri Balakrishnam, Goda Kalyanam, a ballet on Rallabhandi Kavitha Prasad's translation of Rabindranath Tagore's Gitanjali, Sankranti Lakshmi, Siva Bhakta Markandeya based on the text written by Mudigonda Sivaprasad on the life of the sage Markandeya, Swarnotsava Bharati and Vandemataram. She also choreographed Nrityam Darsayami which included a troupe of 12 of her disciples performing for 12 hours uninterruptedly dancing 72 concepts of Kuchipudi.

== Other work ==
Gayatri worked in Punjab National Bank for over 25 years and retired voluntarily. She established Nritya Kinnera Kuchipudi dance academy in Hyderabad in 1983 where she teaches Kuchipudi. As of January 2018, 44 of her disciples debuted on stage from her institute under her supervision.

== Awards ==
Gayatri received several honours for her contributions among which Hamsa Award (now called Kala Ratna) was conferred by the government of united Andhra Pradesh in 2001. She was also conferred the Sangeet Natak Akademi Award in 2023.

== Personal life ==
Gayatri married Maddali Raghuram who is also an artist and runs Kinnera Art Theatre. They have two sons among which one of whose wife, Soundarya Kaushik, is also a Kuchipudi exponent and has debuted on stage in August 2014 supervised by Gayatri.

== Published works ==
- అమ్మమ్మగారి కాశీయాత్ర [Grandmother's pilgrimage to Varanasi] (in Telugu). Kinnera Publications.
- Kuchipudi Art and Satyabhama. B. R. Rhythms. 2016. ISBN 9788188827565.
