= Nataraja Ramakrishna =

Dance teacher from Andhra Pradesh, India (1923–2011)

Nataraja Ramakrishna నటరాజ రామకృష్ణ
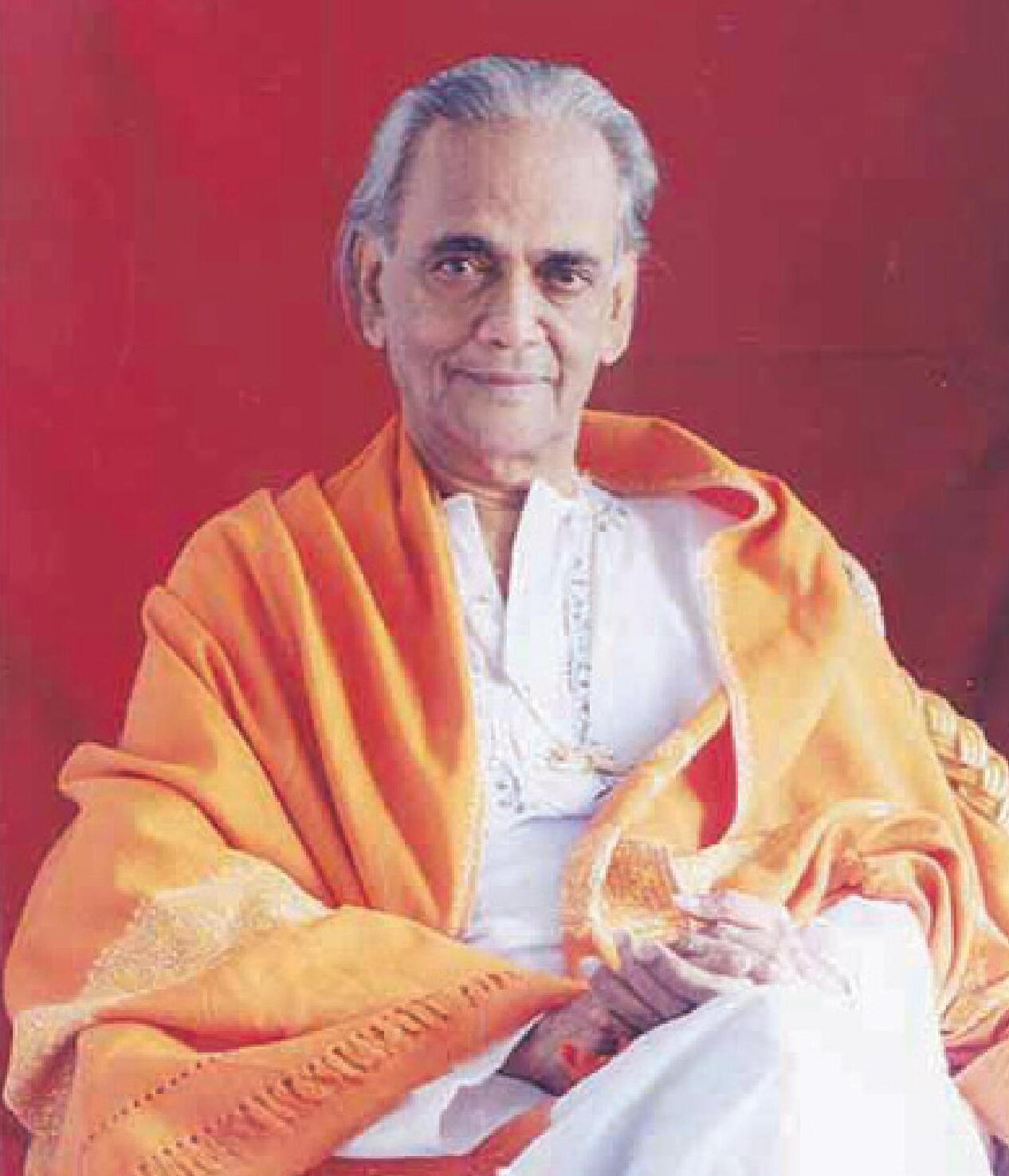
- Portrait of Nataraja Ramakrishna from తెలంగాణ తేజోమూర్తులు
- Born: 21 March 1923; Bali, Indonesia (then Dutch East Indies)
- Died: 7 June 2011 (aged 88); Nizam's Institute of Medical Sciences (NIMS), Hyderabad
- Known for: Classical dancer, Guru, Writer, Classical Dance Composer, Reviver of Andhra Natyam, Perini Shivatandavam-
- Parent(s): Damayanti Devi, Rammohan Rao
- Awards: Padma Shri; 1992

Nataraja Ramakrishna (21 March 1923 – 7 June 2011) was an Indian dance guru. He was the chairman of Andhra Pradesh Sangeeta Nataka Academy, and a musicologist who promoted classical dance in Andhra Pradesh and worldwide.

== Early life ==
Ramakrishna was born in Bali, Indonesia to an ethnic Indian migrant family of Telugu descent from the Indian state of Andhra Pradesh. His parents were Damayanti Devi who hailed from Nalgonda, and Ramamohan Rao, from East Godavari. His mother, a veena exponent, died when Ramakrishna was three years old. The family later returned to India.

From his childhood, Ramakrishna was interested in classical dance forms. He left his family and property for the love of art since his father did not approve of it. He spent his boyhood in Ramakrishna Math at Madras and Mahatma Gandhi's ashram. His elder brother Shyama Sundar was his mentor. During his childhood he came in touch with gurus like Meenakshi Sundaram Pillai, Vedantam Laxminarayana Sastry, Naidupeta Rajamma, Pendyala Satyabhama and Jampa Muthyam under whom he learnt various forms of art. His first dance teacher was Sukhdev Kartak in Nagpur.

== Dance and awards ==
His dance performance before the royal assembly consisting of scholars, poets, art critics and the elite of Nagpur city was his turning point. At the age of 18, he was given the title of "Nataraja" in Nagpur, by the then ruler of Maratha. He was the architect of the revival of the Andhra Natyam dance form, a devotional temple dance tradition performed in Andhra Pradesh for over 2000 years until virtually extinct. He is also known for reviving Perini Shivatandavam, 700-year-old dance form and brought international fame to it along with Kuchipudi, another traditional dance form.

On request of the then Chief Minister of Andhra Pradesh, Neelam Sanjiva Reddy he established Nritya Niketan - a dance school at Hyderabad. Other awards bestowed upon him were the Padma Shri in 1992, "Kala Prapoorna" – a doctorate from the Andhra University and a ‘Bharata Kala Prapoorna,'- by Andhra Pradesh Sangeet Natak Akademi and NTR State Award by Andhra Pradesh State government. He was awarded with Raja-Lakshmi Award in 1991. Over his long career he trained many dancers and wrote and choreographed highly acclaimed dance dramas. He helped to propagate Chindu Yakshaganam (Telugu: చిందు-యక్షగానం), an ancient folk form of Telangana and revived other folk arts like Tappetagullu (Telugu: తప్పెటగుళ్లు) of Srikakulam and Vizianagaram districts, Veera Natyam and Garagalu of East and West Godavari districts, Devadasi dance and dance tradition of temples performing Adhyatma Ramayana.

He also helped and encouraged dance artistes like Dommaras, Guravayyalu, Urumulu and Veedi Bhagavatulu. He also practiced Satvikabhinaya- a dance art. He composed life of Lord Venkateswara as a "Nrutya nataka" (ballet). As a research scholar sponsored by the Government of India, he worked in the then USSR (now Russia) and France to propagate Indian dance art, making a comparative study of Indian and western Classical and folk dances. He was bestowed with the Sangeet Natak Akademi Fellowship (Academi Ratna) on 21 January 2011. He wrote more than 40 books, many of them highly awarded, and his contribution to the art of dance is widely recognized. With his innumerable performances, lecture demonstrations and through his extensive travels he created an awareness not only of Kuchipudi dance, but also revived the lost and forgotten dance forms of Andhra Pradesh. He was awarded Bharata kala prapoorna award.

== Death ==
As per his wish, Nataraja Ramakrishna was laid to rest in a plot allotted by Government near the Taramati Baradari in Hyderabad, built by seventh Sultan of Golconda, Abdullah Qutb Shah who as an ode to his favorite courtesan, Taramati.
