= Shanta Rao =

Indian dancer (1925–2007)

- Born: 1925; Bombay, British India (now Mumbai, India)
- Died: 28 December 2007 (aged 81–82); Malleswaram, Bangalore, India
- Occupation: Classical dancer
- Awards: Padma Shri, Sangeet Natak Akademi Award, Kalidas Samman

Shanta Rao (c. 1925 – 28 December 2007) was a dancer from India. She studied and performed Kathakali, Bharatanatyam and Kuchipudi. She received the Padma Shri, Sangeet Natak Akademi Award and Kalidas Samman for Classical Dance. She was born in 1925 in Bombay (now Mumbai) and lived there and Bangalore. She died on 28 December 2007 at her home at Malleswaram, Bangalore.

== Life and career ==
Shanta Rao was born around 1925 to Saraswat Brahmins. Rao traveled to study at Kerala Kalamandalam with a chaperone in 1939.

She made her debut in Kathakali in 1940 in Thrissur.

Rao studied Bharatanatyam from Meenakshisundaram Pillai. She made her debut in Bharatnatyam at the Music Academy of Madras in 1942. Rao studied Kuchipudi under Vempati Chinna Satyam. She formulated Bhamanatyam.

== Performances ==
- Sangeet Natak Akademi's Swarna Jayanti Mahotsava, celebrating India's 50th year of independence, organised in Delhi in 1997.
- Ashta Mahishi, a two-hour Bhamanatyam composition recounting legends of the eight wives of Krishna.- (June 2006)

== Awards and achievements ==
- Padma Shri by the Government of India, 1971
- Sangeet Natak Akademi - given by Sangeet Natak Akademi, India's National Academy for Music, Dance and Drama, 1970
- Kalidas Samman for Classical Dance of Government of Madhya Pradesh, 1993-94

== Bibliography ==
- Sunil Janah; Ashoke Chatterjee (1979). Dances of the Golden Hall: Photographs of the Indian classical dancer Shanta Rao. Indian Council for Cultural Relations.
