= Swathi Somnath =

Indian Kuchipudi exponent

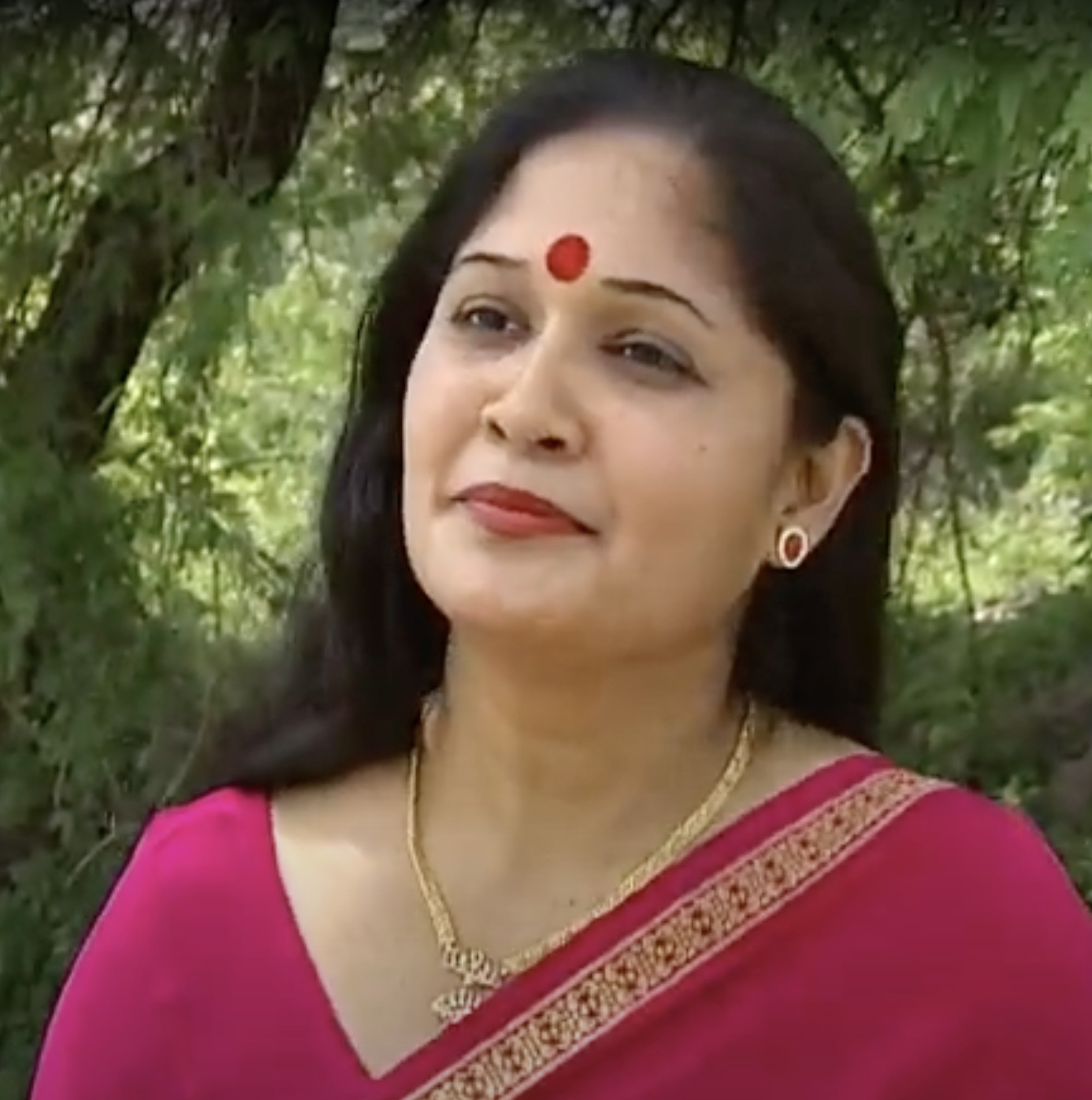
- Swathi in October 2020
- Born: Doosi Swathi; Chakradharpur, Bihar (now in Jharkhand), India
- Education: Master's degree (Central University of Hyderabad); Master of Philosophy
- Occupation: Kuchipudi dancer
- Known for: Ballet based on Kama Sutra
- Awards: Kala Ratna

Swathi Somnath (born Doosi Swathi) is an Indian Kuchipudi exponent and dance teacher from the state of Andhra Pradesh. She performed a dance ballet based on Kama Sutra, Hindu literature on erotic love, through which she gained recognition. She received Kala Ratna award in 2006. She established Nritya Bharathi in Hyderabad and Sampradayam Dance and Music Centre in Srikakulam district.

== Personal life ==
Swathi was born to Somnath, an Indian Railways employee, and Lakshmi in Chakradharpur, Bihar (now in Jharkhand) in a Hindu Brahmin family. (Note: The Hindu reported that Swathi was born and brought up at Doosi Agraharam, Srikakulam district, Andhra Pradesh. However, Bnim stated she was born in Bihar.) Her family hails from Doosi Agraharam, Srikakulam district. She has one brother who also works in Indian Railways. She grew up in West Bengal before moving to Hyderabad. She completed her education with a Master's degree in Kuchipudi from Central University of Hyderabad, and Master of Philosophy in English Literature. As of October 2020, she is pursuing Ph.D in English Literature from Osmania University. She married Chavali Ravi Kumar, a film director in Telugu cinema.

== Kuchipudi dance ==
Swathi performed Lambadi dance during her school days. She started learning dance when she was 11 year old and later learned Kuchipudi and Bharatanatyam at Sumathi Kaushal for four years at a young age. After completing secondary school, she debuted in August 1980 on stage in Ravindra Bharathi. Following her father's death in 1981, she continued her performances to run her house financially, given her family was in lower middle class, and continued her further education simultaneously. Shortly thereafter, she said, she formed her own orchestra at the age of 16 and started performance on her own. In the memory of her father, she changed her last name to his name, Somnath.

Her ballet Vatsayani Kamasutra, based on Vātsyāyana's erotic love Hindu literature, Kama Sutra, garnered her recognition. It was well received among rasikas (audience of Indian classical music) and was criticized by conservative dancers citing the depiction of sringara (erotic love) on the stage. Bnim penned the script.

She established a dance academy Nritya Bharathi in Hyderabad in 1990s. In 2015, the Government of Andhra Pradesh allocated 12–16 acres (49,000–65,000 m^{2}) (Note: The Hindu reported the allotment as 16 acres (65,000 m^{2}), Sakshi reported 13 acres (53,000 m^{2}). In an interview, Swathi said it was 12 acres (49,000 m^{2}).) in Kallepalli village near Srikakulam supporting her to set up a cultural centre to teach classical music and dance. Andhra Pradesh Praja Natyamandali among others protested the government's move stating that she was not brought up in Srikakulam district and suggested alternate native dancers be considered for the land allotment. She eventually established her gurukula academy, Sampradayam Dance and Music Centre and is serving as its director in addition to teaching Kuchipudi. According to her, the construction cost of the academy was ₹5 crore (US$520,000). The foundation stone was laid on 15 August 2015, on Indian Independence Day. The institution is affiliated to Sri Venkateswara University, Tirupati and offers certificate courses to students who completed their secondary schooling.

She performed in over 100 ballets, some of which include Draupadi based on Draupadi, Kama To Moksha based on Kama Sutra, Hindutva, Sahrnam Govindam, Soundarya Darshana based on the life of Ramanuja, Sarvagnya Shankara based on the life of Adi Shankara.

In an interview with DD Yadagiri, she said she also learned Odissi classical dance although limited to basics.

== Other work ==
She has worked as a member of Central Board of Film Certification and Central Audition Board for Kuchipudi, dance, New Delhi. In addition, she also serves as the principal of College of Music and Dance, Hyderabad.

== Awards ==
Swathi was conferred with Kala Ratna award in 2006 by the government of united Andhra Pradesh for her contributions to Kuchipudi.
