= Vempati =

Vempati is a Telugu surname:

- Vempati Chinna Satyam is a legendary dancer and a guru of Kuchipudi dance form.
- Vempati Sadasivabrahmam was a versatile film writer.
