= C. S. N. Patnaik =

Indian sculptor and painter (1925–2022)

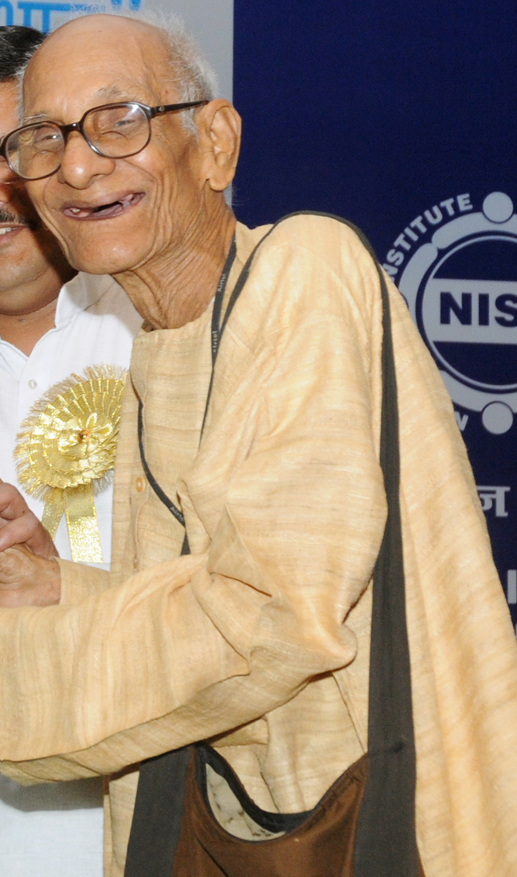
- Patnaik in 2011
- Born: 6 December 1925; Srikakulam district, Madras Presidency, British India
- Died: 11 August 2022 (aged 96); Visakhapatnam, Andhra Pradesh, India
- Occupations: Sculptor; painter
- Children: 4
- Awards: Kala Ratna

Chowdhary Satyanarayana Patnaik (6 December 1925 – 11 August 2022), commonly known as C. S. N. Patnaik, was an Indian sculptor and painter from the state of Andhra Pradesh. He specialized in fresco and mural painting and bronze sculpting. His paintings incorporated depictions of rural life and its tradition and culture. He sculpted a statue of Mahatma Gandhi which was installed at the Telangana Legislative Assembly. He received the Kala Ratna award in 2006.

== Early life ==
Patnaik was born on 6 December 1925 in Badam village in the present-day Srikakulam district, Andhra Pradesh (then in Madras Presidency).

== Career ==
Patnaik received training in sculpting and painting from Government College of Arts and Crafts in Madras. He started working as a Karanam, a village administrative officer. He later worked as a government employee in Education Department in 1955. He moved to Guntur in 1962 and became a lecturer in sculpture in Government College for Women in Guntur.

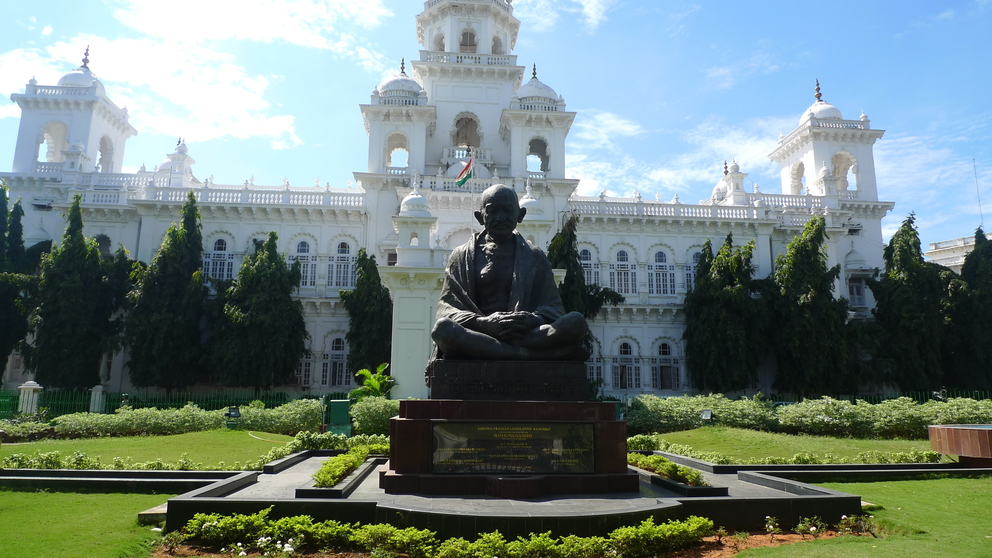
Statue of Mahatma Gandhi on the premises of Telangana Legislative Assembly, Hyderabad

He specialized in fresco and mural painting and bronze sculpting. He is known for his depictions of Srikakulam district's rural life and its tradition and culture in his paintings. His sculptures established on the Tank Bund Road and Mahatma Gandhi's statue located on the premises of Telangana Legislative Assembly in Hyderabad earned him recognition. In 1975, the University Grants Commission granted him a research fellowship to study metallurgical sculptures and the effect of terracotta over them. As part of the research, he studied the sculpture art in North India.

He was an expert in box moulding and casting. His works were exhibited across the country and in Australia, Bulgaria, Hungary, Japan, Poland, Romania and the U.S.. He said that he worked on more than 400 paintings and 100 bronze sculptures.

== Other work ==
Patnaik represented the Andhra University and the Acharya Nagarjuna University in the Lalit Kala Akademi of Andhra Pradesh during 1969 to 1979. He acted as the vice-president of the Andhra Academy of Arts, Vijayawada, between 1972 and 1977, and was joint secretary of the Sculptors Forum of India in New Delhi in 1976. He was vice-president of the Lalit Kala Akademi in Hyderabad from 1977 to 1982.

== Awards ==
Among honours Patnaik received, the most notable one is the Kala Ratna award, conferred by the government of united Andhra Pradesh in 2006.

== Personal life ==
Patnaik had four children. His younger son, Ravi Shankar Patnaik (August 1961 – 29 April 2021) and his wife, Sandhya Chowdary Patnaik both who are also artists, established "CSN Patnaik Art Gallery" in MVP Colony, Visakhapatnam, in 2009, to provide a space for exhibiting artwork of other artists. Ravi Shankar worked as a faculty and Head of the Department of the Fine Arts Department of Andhra University. He was one of the noted sculptors in the country.

== Death ==
Patnaik died on 11 August 2022 in Visakhapatnam.
