= Deepika Reddy =

Indian classical dancer and teacher (born 1965)

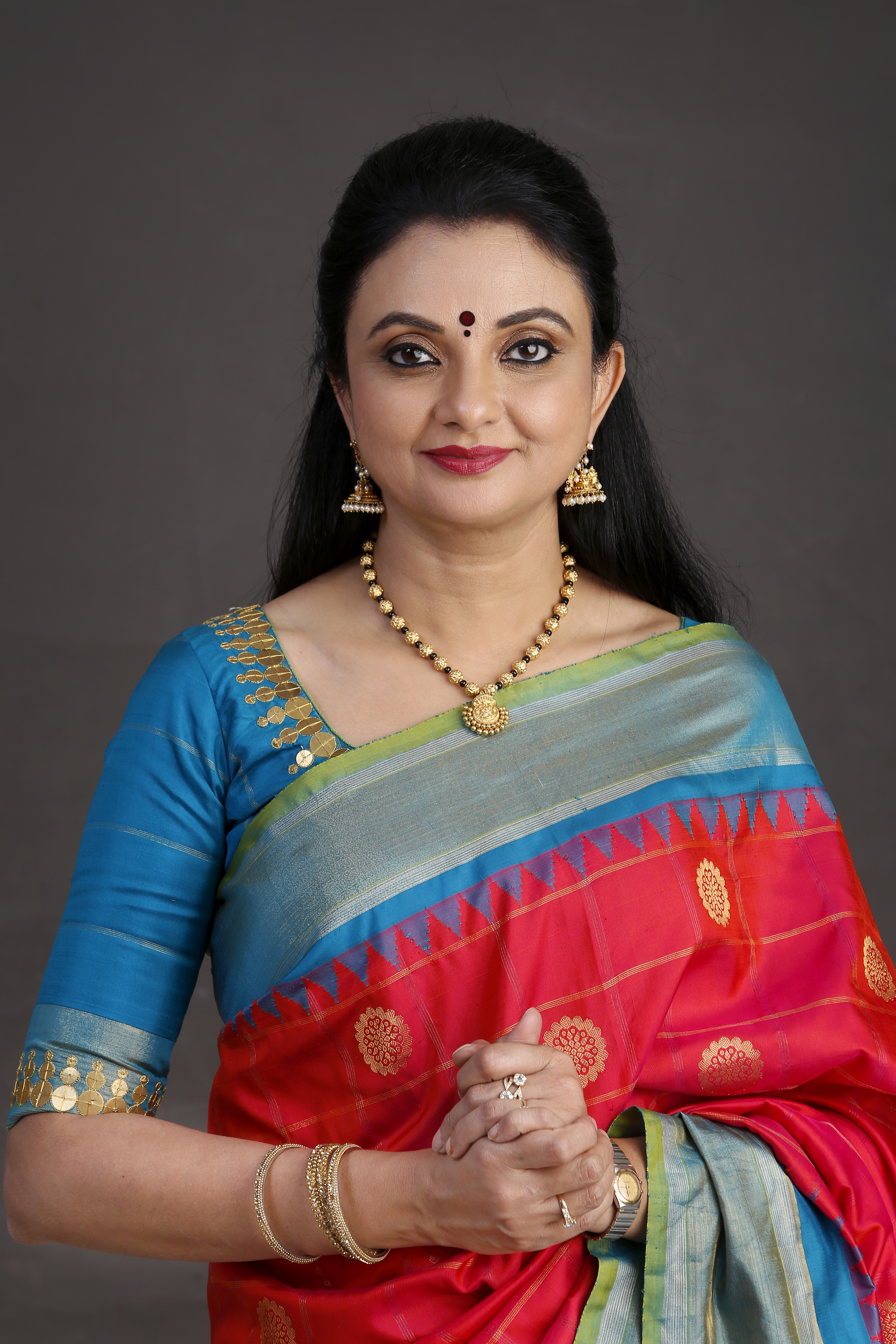
- Reddy in 2018
- Born: 15 September 1965 (age 60); Hyderabad, Telangana, India
- Occupations: Kuchipudi dancer, dance teacher, choreographer
- Years active: 1976–present
- Awards: Padma Shri (2026); Sangeet Natak Akademi Award (2017); Telangana State Formation Awards (2016)

Deepika Reddy is an Indian classical dancer, choreographer and dance teacher from Telangana. She is an exponent in Kuchipudi art form. She received the Sangeet Natak Akademi Award for Kuchipudi in 2017. She has also been awarded the Padma Shri by the Government of India in 2026.

She served as the Chairperson of Telangana State Sangeet Natak Akademi from July 2022 to December 2023.

== Biography ==
Deepika Reddy was born on 15 September 1965, in Hyderabad, Telangana, India. Her father, V.R. Reddy, was Additional Solicitor General of India, Advocate General, composite Andhra Pradesh, and chairman, Bar Council of India before his retirement. Her mother, Radhika Reddy, was a classical dancer who played the lead role in the ballet Chitrangada for the inauguration of Ravindra Bharathi in 1961. Her grandfather, Nukala Ramachandra Reddy, was a freedom fighter and served as a four-time cabinet minister of composite Andhra Pradesh.

Deepika Reddy married Shyamgopal Reddy, an industrialist. They have twin children. The daughter is a Kuchipudi dancer and performs in the country and abroad.

== Career ==
Reddy began dancing at the age of 6. Her debut took place in 1976 at Ravindra Bharathi, where she performed in front of the then chief minister. After her marriage, she trained with Vempati Chinna Satyam.

In 2000, Reddy founded Deepanjali with the goal of preserving and passing on the art of Kuchipudi dance. She has trained hundreds of students, many of whom have gone on to perform nationally and internationally. She has also trained socially and economically disadvantaged children.

== Notable performances ==
Reddy has performed in Khajuraho, Konark, Hampi, Thousand Pillar Temple, Ramappa, Mahabalipuram and Golkonda. She performed at the Ayodhya Temple in 2024 and Maha Kumbh Mela in 2025. She has performed in dance festivals in India and abroad, including the Festival of India in Berlin, the Sri Lankan Parliament, the Bolshoi Theatre in Russia, festivals in Bangkok and South Korea.

== Awards and honors ==
- Padma Shri – 2026
- National Sangeet Natak Akademi award – 2017
- Andhra Pradesh Govt. State award Kala Ratna – 2007
- Akkineni Nageswara Rao Swarna Kankanam – 2011
- Nataraja Samman by Saduguru Sri Thyagabrahma Aradhana Kainkarya Trust – 2016

Reddy was the former chairperson of the Telangana Sangeet Natak Akademi. She was a Governing Council member of Sangeet Natak Akademi, Delhi and was a member of the Selection Committees for Telangana State Awards, Khajuraho Dance Festival, Telangana State women's day awards and Doordarshan for grading dancers. She was a member of Regional Film Censor Board, jury member of Nandi State Film Awards and former Chairperson of the Cultural Committee of the International Children's Film Festival.
