= V. Satyanarayana Sarma =

Indian classical dancer and choreographer

- Born: 9 September 1935; Kuchipudi, Krishna district Andhra Pradesh, India
- Died: 16 November 2012 (aged 77); Vijayawada, Andhra Pradesh, India
- Other name: Satyam
- Occupations: Classical dancer Choreographer
- Known for: Kuchipudi
- Spouse: Lakshminarasamma
- Children: One son and two daughters
- Parent(s): Vedantam Venkataratnam; Subbamma
- Awards: Padma Shri; Sangeet Natak Akademi Fellowship; Sangeet Natak Akademi Award; Kalidas Samman

Vedantam Satyanarayana Sarma (1935–2012), popularly known as Satyam, was an Indian classical dancer and choreographer, considered by many as one of the leading exponents of the classical dance form of Kuchipudi. He was known for his portrayal of female characters such as Usha (Usha Parinayam), Satyabhama (Bhama Kalapam), Deva Devi (Vipra Narayana), Mohini (Mohini Rukmangada), Sasirekha (Sasirekha Parinayam) and Gollabhama (Gollakalapam). (Note: Names of the respective dance-dramas in brackets.) He was a recipient of several honors including Kalidas Samman, Sangeet Natak Akademi Award and Sangeet Natak Akademi Fellowship. The Government of India awarded him the fourth highest civilian honour of the Padma Shri, in 1970, for his contributions to Dance.

== Biography ==
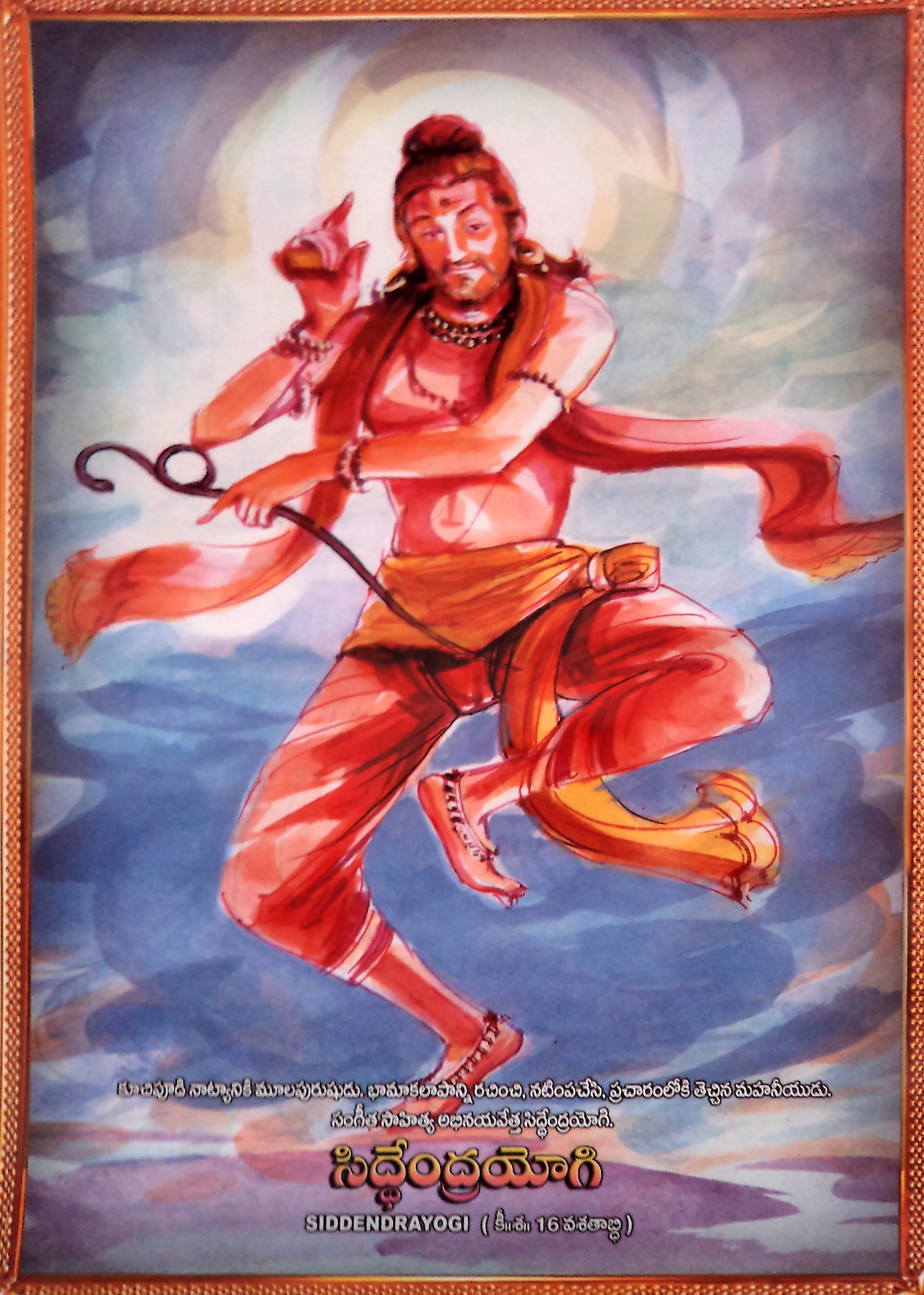
Portrait of Siddhendra Yogi

Satyanarayana Sarma was born on 9 September 1935 at Kuchipudi, (Note: The dance form, Kuchipudi, is named after the village, where the art is known to have originated from.) a small village in Krishna district of the south Indian state of Andhra Pradesh in Vedantam family which is known for its Kuchipudi tradition, to Vedantam Venkataratnam and Subbamma. He started training Kuchipudi at the age of five under his elder brother, Vedantam Prahalada Sarma, and later trained under known exponents, Vedantam Lakshminarayana Sastri and Chinta Krishnamurthy. He also did training in classical music under Yeleswarapu Seetharamanjaneyulu and Sishta Brahmaiah Sastry, as Bhagawata Melam (Kuchipudi Yakshagaanam), a dance-drama format of Kuchipudi required the performer to sing as well. He made his debut at the age of fourteen, performing in two melams, Harischandra and Ramanatakam, staged at a local temple by the group led by Pasumarthy Kondalarayudu. His first major performance came at the age on nineteen, when he portrayed the role of Parvathi in Usha Parinayam, staged in Sapru House, Delhi.

Sarma continued performing as female characters in many melams and his portrayal of Sathyabhama in the dance-drama, Bhama Kalapam, reportedly written by Siddhendra Yogi (Note: The origin of Kuchipudi is attributed to the contributions of Narayana Teertha and his disciple, Siddhendra Yogi. Bhama Kalapam is the popular name of Parijatapaharana, a play written by Yogi.) later became his signature role. Gollabhama, Mohini, Sasirekha and Devadevi were some of his other notable characters. He is known to have developed a new ethos in abhinaya, often termed as Eka Patra, which, in the beginning, did not meet with the approval of many traditionalists of the art form. He performed in over 10,000 stages, including in front of Rukmini Devi Arundale, the founder of Kalakshetra. In 1967, he performed as a male dancer in a dance sequence, Girija Kalyanam, in the Telugu film, Rahasyam, directed by Vedantam Raghavayya. Towards the latter part of his life, he was more involved in teaching the dance at Venkatarama Natya Mandali, a dance school dedicated to Kuchipudi, at his native place. He also wrote several texts on the dance form and Natya Shastra, Abhinaya Darpanam, Tandava Lakshanam and Alankara Shastram feature among them.

Sarma was married to Lakshminarasamma and the couple had a son and two daughters. He died on 16 November 2012, at the age of 77, succumbing to respiratory illnesses at a private hospital in Vijayawada. His life has been documented in a film, I am Satyabhama, directed by Dulam Satyanarayana.

== Awards and honors ==
Sarma received the Sangeet Natak Akademi Award in 1961, making him the first Kuchipudi exponent to receive the honor. Six years later, the Akademi honored him again, with Sangeet Natak Akademi Ratna in 1967. The Government of India included him in the Republic Day honors list for the civilian honor of the Padma Shri in 1970. The Government of Madhya Pradesh also honored him with their civilian award, Kalidas Samman, in 1988.

== See also ==
- Kuchipudi
- Narayana Teertha

A Kuchipudi Sequence
