= Kalidas Samman =

Arts award by the Government of Madhya Pradesh

The Kalidas Samman (Hindi: कालिदास सम्मान) is an arts award presented annually by the Government of Madhya Pradesh in India. The award is named after Kalidasa, a renowned Classical Sanskrit writer of ancient India. The Kalidas Samman was first awarded in 1980. It was initially conferred in alternate years in four fields: Classical Music, Classical Dance, Theatre and Plastic Arts. From 1986-87 to 2008-09, the awards were presented in all four fields in most years, thereafter being awarded to one person per year.

== Recipients ==
The recipients of the Kalidas Samman:

Year	Name	Field
1980–81	Semmangudi Srinivasa Iyer	Classical Music
1980–81	Mallikarjun Mansur	Classical Music
1981–82	K. G. Subramanyan	Plastic Arts
1982–83	Sombhu Mitra	Theatre
1983–84	Rukmini Devi Arundale	Classical Dance
1984–85	Kumar Gandharva	Classical Music
1985–86	Ram Kumar	Plastic Arts
1986–87	Zia Mohiuddin Dagar	Classical Music
1986–87	Birju Maharaj	Classical Dance
1986–87	Ebrahim Alkazi	Theatre
1986–87	Narayan Shridhar Bendre	Plastic Arts
1987–88	Ravi Shankar	Classical Music
1987–88	V. Satyanarayana Sarma	Classical Dance
1987–88	P.L. Deshpande	Theatre
1987–88	M.F. Husain	Plastic Arts
1988–89	M.S. Subbulakshmi	Classical Music
1988–89	Kelucharan Mohapatra	Classical Dance
1988–89	Tripti Mitra	Theatre
1988–89	Tyeb Mehta	Plastic Arts
1989–90	Vilayat Khan	Classical Music
1989–90	Guru Bipin Singh	Classical Dance
1989–90	Habib Tanvir	Theatre
1989–90	Vasudeo S. Gaitonde	Plastic Arts
1990–91	Padma Subramanyam	Classical Dance
1990–91	Vijay Tendulkar	Theatre
1991–92	Ali Akbar Khan	Classical Music
1991–92	Ram Narayan	Classical Music
1991–92	Vempati Chinna Satyam	Classical Dance
1991–92	Vijaya Mehta	Theatre
1991–92	Jagdish Swaminathan	Plastic Arts
1992–93	Ramankutty Nair	Classical Dance
1992–93	Ammannur Madhava Chakyar	Classical Dance
1992–93	Badal Sarkar	Theatre
1992–93	Syed Haider Raza	Plastic Arts
1993–94	Shanta Rao	Classical Dance
1993–94	B.V. Karanth	Theatre
1994–95	Padmavati Gokhale Shaligram	Classical Music
1994–95	Kavalam Narayan Panikkar	Theatre
1995–96	Alla Rakha	Classical Instrumental
1995–96	Sitara Devi	Classical Dance
1995–96	Manna Dey	Classical Vocal
1996–97	Kishan Maharaj	Classical Music
1996–97	Mrinalini Sarabhai	Classical Dance
1996–97	Shriram Lagoo	Theatre
1996–97	Sheila Bhatia	Theatre
1996–97	Bhupen Khakhar	Plastic Arts
1997–98	Pandit Jasraj	Classical Music
1997–98	Kalamandalam Kalyanikutty Amma	Classical Dance
1997–98	Tapas Sen	Theatre
1997–98	Akbar Padamsee	Plastic Arts
1998–99	D. K. Pattammal	Classical Music
1998–99	Kalanidhi Narayanan	Classical Dance
1998–99	Girish Karnad	Theatre
1998–99	Arpita Singh	Plastic Arts
1999–2000	Hariprasad Chaurasia	Classical Music
1999–2000	K. P. Kittappa Pillai	Classical Dance
1999–2000	Satyadev Dubey	Theatre
1999–2000	Francis Newton Souza	Plastic Arts
2000–01	M. Balamuralikrishna	Classical Music
2000–01	Rohini Bhate	Classical Dance
2000–01	Zohra Sehgal	Theatre
2000–01	Sankho Chaudhuri	Plastic Arts
2001–02	Sumati Mutatkar	Classical Music
2001–02	Yamini Krishnamurthy	Classical Dance
2001–02	K.V. Subbanna	Theatre
2001–02	Jogen Chowdhury	Plastic Arts
2002–03	Rahim Fahimuddin Dagar	Classical Music
2002–03	Kumudini Lakhia	Classical Dance
2002–03	Khalid Chaudhary	Theatre
2002–03	Ghulam Mohammed Sheikh	Plastic Arts
2003–04	V.G. Jog	Classical Music
2003–04	Chandralekha	Classical Dance
2003–04	Gursharan Singh	Theatre
2003–04	Himmat Shah	Plastic Arts
2004–05	Prabha Atre	Classical Music
2004–05	Rajkumar Singhajit Singh	Classical Dance
2004–05	Devendra Raj Ankur	Theatre
2004–05	Nagji Patel	Plastic Arts
2005–06	Zakir Hussain	Classical Music
2005–06	Kanak Rele	Classical Dance
2005–06	Ratan Thiyam	Theatre
2005–06	Manjit Bawa	Plastic Arts
2006–07	Puttaraj Gawai	Classical Music
2006–07	Sonal Mansingh	Classical Dance
2006–07	Vimal Lath	Theatre
2006–07	Shanti Dave	Plastic Arts
2007–08	Pt. Balwantrai Bhatt 'Bhavrang'	Classical Music
2007–08	C.V. Chandrasekhar	Classical Dance
2007–08	Babasaheb Purandare	Theatre
2007–08	Satish Gujral	Plastic Arts
2008–09	Chhannulal Mishra	Classical Music
2008–09	Jairma Patel	Plastic Arts
2008–09	Kalamandalam Gopi	Classical Dance
2009–10	Saroja Vaidyanathan	Classical Dance
2009–10	N. Rajam	Classical Music
2010–11	Anupam Kher	Theatre
2012–13	Keshavrao Musalgaonkar	
2014–15	Raj Bisaria	Theatre
2015–16	Bansi Kaul	Theatre
2015–16	Robin David	Sculpture Arts
2016–17	Ram Gopal Bajaj	Theatre
2017–18	Lakshmi Viswanathan	
2018	Anjolie Ela Menon	Visual Arts
2018	Surendra Verma	Theatre
2020	Aruna Sairam	Indian Music (Carnatic Music)
2022	Pt. Venkatesh Kumar	Classical Music
2024	Raghupati Bhat	Ganjifa Arts
