= Keshavrao =

Keshavrao or Keshav Rao is a name. People with the name include:

== Keshavrao ==
- Keshavrao Jedhe
- Keshavrao Date
- Keshavrao Baliram Hedgewar
- Keshavrao Sonawane
- Keshavrao Bhole
- Keshavrao Bhosale
- Keshavrao Krishnarao Datey
- Keshavrao Musalgaonkar
- Gulabrao Keshavrao Jedhe

== Keshav Rao ==
- Keshav Rao Jadhav
- Keshav Rao Koratkar
- K. Keshava Rao
