= Indian Nutcracker =

Indian Nutcracker, also called Swapna Vijayam, is an adaptation of the 1892 ballet The Nutcracker into the South Indian classical dance form of Kuchipudi, with Telugu lyrics. It was first performed on 15 December 2007 at the Robert Ferst Center for the Arts at Georgia Tech, to raise funds for the Emory University Telugu Initiative.

== Production ==
It was produced, directed and choreographed by Sasikala Penumarthi, the founder and director of the Academy of Kuchipudi Dance, which was established in 1997 in Atlanta, Georgia as a non-profit organization. The lyrics were written by Indraganti Srikantha Sarma, from Hyderabad, India. Music for the performance was composed by Atlanta-based singer Subhashini Krishnamurthy, and the dance choreography was by Sasikala Penumarthi.

The costume design sought to fuse Indian and Western "aesthetic sensibilities".

The performance was presented with live orchestral support from Sujatha Rayburn (Female Vocal), Satish Menon (Male Vocal), Sastry Bhagavatula (Nattuvangam or Beat), Suresh Kodandaraman (Mridangam or Drum), V.K. Raman (Flute), Sandhya Srinath (Violin), Seshu Sarma (Veena), Subra Vishwanathan (Mridangam or Drum). More than 35 artists who have trained at the Academy of Kuchipudi Dance performed on stage. Stage direction was provided by Dr. P.V. Rao, Professor in Physics, Emory University and Ravi Penumarthi. The fundraising committee was led by Professor Joyce Flueckiger, incoming Director of the Program of South Asian Studies, Emory University.

== Synopsis ==
At a Christmas party hosted by her parents, Princess Swapna is given a nutcracker by the magician, Mayura. The toy actually holds Mayura's nephew, who will only be freed by "the love of a maiden". When Swapna falls asleep that night, Mayura transports her to a dream world. There, the nutcracker becomes the prince Sundara Rakumara, who battles the Mouse King Mushikasura. Sundara is killed in the battle, but Mayura resurrects him. The prince and Swapna travel to his kingdom, the Land of Spring and Everlasting Youth, where the residents greet them.

When Swapna awakes, she sees Sundara Rakumara has returned to his human form. Mayura blesses the couple.

== Reception ==
The 2007 performance played to a "packed" audience, with positive reviews from attendees.
