= Andhra Natyam =

Type of dance

Andhranatyam
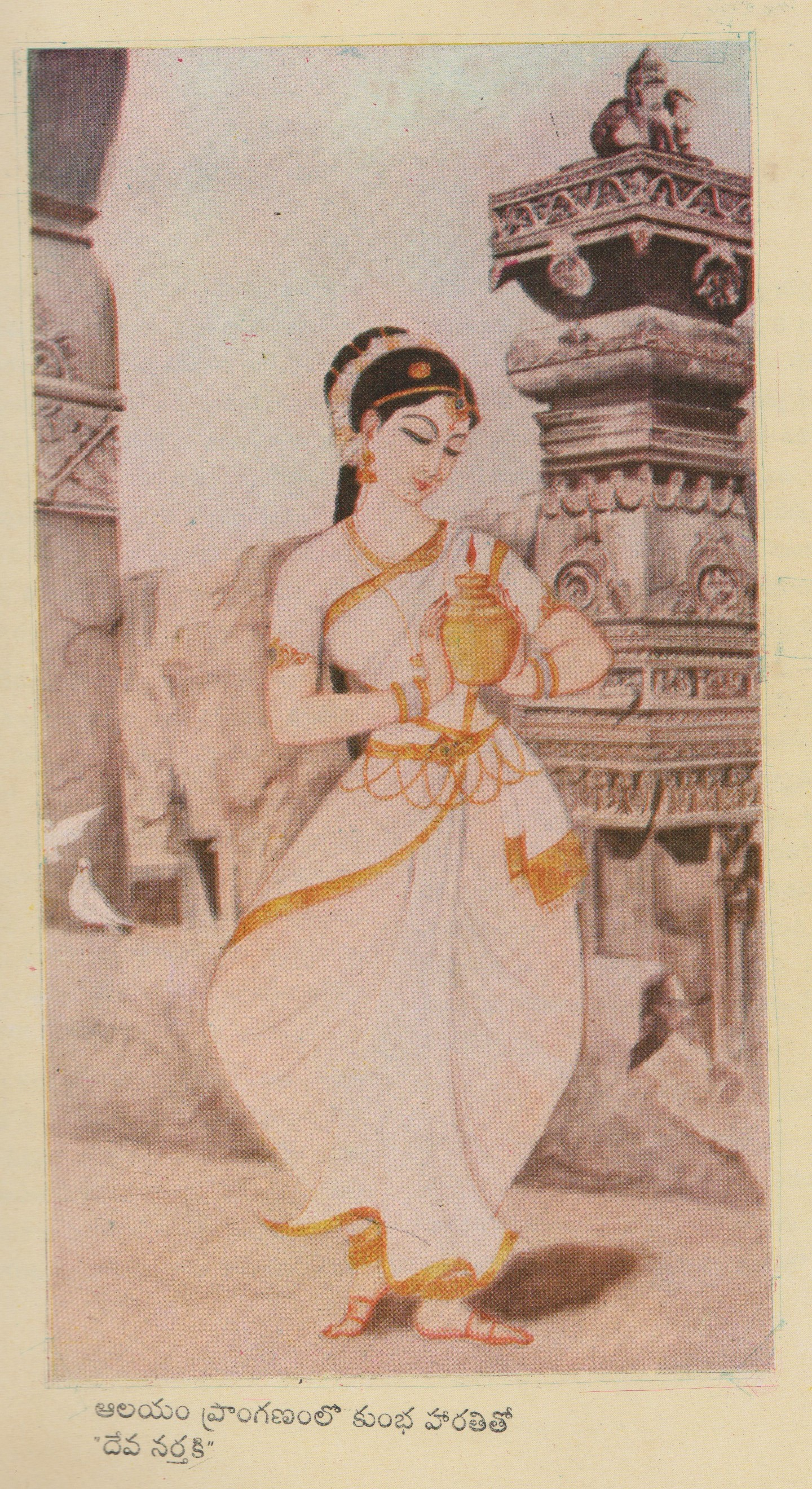
- Andhra Natyam performer holding Kumbha Harathi
- Genre: Indian classical dance
- Origin: Andhra Pradesh, India

Andhranatyam (Telugu: ఆంధ్రనాట్యం) is a classical dance form originating in the state of Andhra Pradesh, which has been in vogue for the past 2000 years. Rooted in the ancient Nattuva Mela tradition, one of India’s two ancient dance traditions. Natya Mela (such as Kuchipudi) which was traditionally performed by men, and Nattuva Mela was performed exclusively by women.

Historically performed in Buddhist Aramas, Hindu temples, and royal courts of Telugu region by the cultured female artists. The dance form evolved across the Andhra Satavahanas, Andhra Ikshvaku, Vishnukundina, Vengi Chalukyas and Kakaitya eras. It was known under various depending on performance setting, names like Aradhana, Kacheri, Darbar, Kelika, Chinna Melam, Mejuvani, and Dasi Ata, etc.

Following the decline of royal patronage during Mughal and British era, Andhranatyam fell into dormancy. It was later revived in 1970 and is being propagated for the last 50 years at national and international platforms, particularly in the Telugu-speaking regions.

== Repertoire ==
Andhranatyam includes beautiful, delicate body movements with graceful gestures and slenderness of the Kaisiki Vritti, performed by the female artists. It has Agama, Asthana, and Prabandha styles in it. It is performed in Marga tradition in temples as prescribed in Agama sastras. With a tinge of the Desi tradition, it is performed in the classical style in temple asthanas and courts of kings called Kacheri, Darbar ata, etc. The Prabandha style is famous for its classical regional rendition with lokadharmi.

Andhranatyam is a combination of Agama, Asthana, and Prabandha traditions, which a female artiste can showcase on the same stage and in the same performance. It is an Eka Patra Kelika, i.e. a solo performance by a female artist. It has been designed and is being depicted as one of the earliest female-oriented dance traditions, with a well-knit repertoire to suit the modern theatre.

The distinct feature of Andhranatyam is the process that depicts the ancient tradition to suit the current stage. The repertoire contains the three traditions: Agama nartanam, Asthana nartanam, and Prabandha nartanam.

=== Agama Nartanam ===
Agama Nartanam, also called as Temple Dance. This form of repertoire is dedicated to the temple deities and performed in the temples. The usage of traditional Kumbha Harathi as a part of the worship to the God is done.

In addition to the items in the image to the right, the following items are also performed:

1. Kauthams
2. Kaivarams
3. Ashtadikpalaka Aaradhana
4. Navasandhi
5. Adhyatma Ramayana Keerthanas, etc.

=== Asthana Nartanam ===
This form of the repertoire is performed in King's courts

In the Asthana sampradaya, selected items like Sabda, Swara, Sahithya Pallavis, Sabdam or salam jatis, Padavarnams, Padams, Javalis, Slokas, etc. are performed. Asthana kelika in a temple is different from a kelika in the court of a king. According to the king's taste, the former leads the audience towards spiritualism, whereas the latter is for entertainment for kings, scholars, intellectuals, and others. Saatvikabhinayam predominates in the depiction of Padam. Slokabhinayam is unique to the version of "Anvayam." Padyams are also performed as part of the repertoire.

=== Prabandha Nartanam ===
This form of repertoire is performed in public places used as a method for story telling.

Kalapams are performed as part of the Prabandha nartanam. The Kalapams are Bhamakalapam, Gollakalapam, Radhamadhavam, etc. In Nattuva Mela tradition, the Bhamakalapam was performed for nine nights outside the temple and called Navajanardhana Parijatham. Earlier it was performed for nine consecutive nights at Kunti Madhava Temple by Late Pendyala Satyabhama and artists from the same family of Pithapuram.

== See also ==
- Perini Sivatandavam
- Vilasini Natyam
