= Keshavrao Musalgaonkar =

Indian educationalist and Sanskrit scholar (born 1928)

- केशवराव मुसलगांवकर
- Born: 30 January 1928 (age 98); Gwalior, Madhya Pradesh
- Education: M.A. in Sanskrit and Hindi and Doctor of Philosophy
- Alma mater: University of Allahabad
- Occupation: Teacher
- Years active: 1971-1972 to 26 January 2013
- Spouse: Pramila Musalgaonkar
- Parent: Mahamahopadhyay Sadasivashastri
- Awards: President's Award in 2008; Kalidas Samman in 2012-2013; Vishwa Bharti Award in 2017; Padma Shri in 2018
- Honours: Certificate of Honor by President of India

Keshav Rao Sadashiv Rao Shastri Musalgaonkar (born 30 January 1928) is an Indian educationalist and Sanskrit scholar known for writing book of two thousand page at the age of 90.

== Personal life ==
Musalgaonkar was born on 30 January 1928 in Gwalior. He is son of Mahamahopadhyay Sadasivashastri. He is married to Pramila Musalgaonkar.

== Career ==
Musalgaonkar has done MA. in Sanskrit and M. A. in Hindi from University of Allahabad and holds Doctor of Philosophy. He has been served as a teacher. He retired on 26 January 2013 after 41 years of working.

== Awards and honours ==
=== Awards ===
- Kalidas Samman in 2012-2013
- Padma Shri in 2018
- President's Award in 2008
- Vishwa Bharti Award in 2017

=== Honors ===
- Congratulated by Shivraj Singh Chouhan, Chief Minister Of Madhya Pradesh on 11 February 2018
- Certificate of Honor by President of India
- Student of Vikram University is doing Doctor of Philosophy on his writing work.
- His written books are in courses of Vikram University and Bastar Vishwavidyalaya.
