= Robin David =

Indian sculptor (born 1950)

- Born: 1950 (age 75–76); Gwalior, India
- Occupation: Sculptor

Robin David (born 1950) is an Indian sculptor based in Bhopal. He is a recipient of the Kalidas Samman.

David played the key role in establishing the sculpture department at Gwalior Art College, Where he also earned his National Diploma in sculpting in 1977. In 1979, he joined the Bharat Bhawan as an assistant director. He was also the curator in the "Yuva Sumbhava" exhibition under the Raza Foundation. In 2020, his biggest exhibition was organised by the Department of Culture at the Ravindra Bhavan cultural centre in Bhopal.

In early 2025, Robin David marked 50 years of his career with a solo exhibition ‘Sculpting Voids’, curated by Aman Preet Kaur. He has also worked with Magsaysay awardee Rajendra Singh on a series of stepwells. David is considered one of the pioneers of sculpture art in Central India, having organised and participated in numerous symposiums across India and internationally, including in Mexico, Turkey, and Italy. He has also trained around 100 artisans.
