= Nukala Ramachandra Reddy =

Indian politician

Nukala Ramachandra Reddy was a renowned politician from the Telangana.

== Early life ==
Nukala Ramachandra Reddy was born in Jamandlapalli, a village 4 km from Mahabubabad (earlier known as Manukota) in Warangal district of Telangana state. Born to Nukala Rangasai Reddy and Rukmini Devi, he had three brothers and one sister. Both his daughter, Radhika Reddy, and granddaughter, Deepika Reddy, are acclaimed Kuchipudi dancers.

== Political career ==
He was elected as Member of Legislative Assembly in 1957, 1962, 1967 and 1972 from Dornakal constituency in Warangal district. In 1972 he won unopposed.
