= Sreelakshmy Govardhanan =

Indian dancer (born 1980)

- ശ്രീലക്ഷ്മി ഗോവർധനൻ
- Born: 1 June 1980 (age 46); Irinjalakuda, Thrissur Kerala, India
- Occupations: Kuchipudi, Artist, Choreographer & Teacher
- Years active: 2001–present

Sreelakshmy Govardhanan, is a Kuchipudi artist from India. She is the disciple of Guru Sri Pasumarthy Rattaiaha Sarma.

She is known for her footwork and abhinaya (acting technique). She is trained under Guru Sri Pasumarthy Rattaiah Sarma, Srimati Vyjayanti Kashi and Srimati Manju Barggavee, in Kuchipudi. She travelled to Andhra to learn Kushipudi. Sreelakshmy Govardhanan is widely acclaimed for her ability to bring alive the charm and beauty of Kuchipudi. She has been described as “a dancer who has harnessed the power of Abhinaya”. Sreelakshmy has been the recipient of titles and honours such as ‘Kalashree’ from Kerala Sangeetha Nataka Akademi- state award, Binfeild Endowment from Narada Gana Sabha Chennai, Bharatham Yuva Kalakar, Kala Ratna, Singar Mani, Natya Ratna, Nalanada Nrutya Nipuna to name a few. Sreelakshmy is an empanelled artiste in ‘established’ category of Indian Council for Cultural Relations and a graded artiste of Doordarshan. Other than performing at Indian dance festivals, she has performed on various international platforms in Netherlands, Australia, Italy, France, Germany, Switzerland, United Kingdom, United States, Colombia, Jordan and Gulf countries that has earned her rave reviews. She choreographed a confluence of Indian dance for the inaugural event of ‘Marhaba NaMo in Dubai’ where Prime Minister of India visited United Arab Emirates after 34 years. She also has conceived and curated dance-related workshops and events and was the coordinator of ‘Rasavikalpam’ an annual dance workshop and National dance festival organized by Kerala Sangeetha Nataka Akademi for three consecutive years. Sreelakshmy is the founder and Director of Avantika Space for Dance, a platform dedicated to learning, performance and research. She has choreographed dance moves for the Malayalam feature film Kanyaka Talkies and Priyamanasam.

== Academic ==
- MSc in psychological counseling, Montfort College Bangalore, 2003–04
- Advanced course in Hypnotherapy from AHAM Thrissur, 2008

== Lecture demonstrations in Kuchipudi ==
- Lec dem for Haya Cultural center, Jordan (2015)
- Lec dem at School of Culture and Creative Expressions, Ambedkar University Delhi, Delhi (2015
- 6 days Lec-dem and workshop series at Kota, Rajasthan for SPICMACAY in 2014
- Talk and Lec Dem for Gitaamritham on My Passion My Life, at Ettimada, Coimbatore
- 5 days lec dem series at Ramathapuram for IRCEN 2014
- Lecture Demonstration for Sambodh Foundation, Kollam, Kerala (2014)
- 6 Lecture Demonstrations and performance in Delhi for IRCEN (India International Rural Cultural Centre) 2011 and 2014
- 10 Lecture Demonstrations and performance in Murshidabad District, West Bengal for
- IRCEN (India International Rural Cultural Centre) 2012.
- 10 Lecture Demonstrations and performance at Wakaner in Gujarat for IRCEN (India International Rural Cultural Centre) 2011 Kuchipudi.

== Conducted workshops in Kuchipudi ==
- Kuchipudi workshop at Mahe, under Union Territory of Puducherry
- Kuchipudi workshop at Kottakkal, Kerala for SPICMACAY in 2015
- Kuchipudi workshop at Ernakulam (2011)
- Kuchipudi workshop at Switzerland (2007)
- Kuchipudi workshop at Calicut for Chinmaya Mission (2010)

== Talks on Kuchipudi ==
- Exploring the roots and elements of Kuchipudi Yakshagana. The department of Theatre Sri Sankara College Kalady (2015)
- Theatrical in Kuchipudi; Travel through Bhamakalapam. National symposium, Dept of Philosophy, Sri Sankara College Kaladi. (2015)
- Innovations and sensibilities needed when you venture into Choreography, for 'Krishnayanam' occasion of honoring scholar Sri Kanjoor Krishnan Namboothiripad. Kerala (2015)
- Women in Arts, Trail and Travail at Ammanur Gurukulam, Center for Koodiyattam. Kerala (2014)
- Guest lecture at Govt College of Fine Arts Thrissur on Indian Aesthetics and Sculpture studies based on Bharatas Natya Sastra. (2013)
- Paper presentation on Importance of Art Education in School. (2013) for SCERT Kerala. Govt of Kerala.
- Talk on Hasthas used in Kuchipudi and a comparative study of Nritta Hastas mentioned in Natya Sastra, Abhinaya Darpanam and Hasta Mukthavali. Mudra, Guruvayur Devaswam.
- Talk on Healing power of Dance for Center for Vedic Studies and Astrology, Irinjalakuda
- Art and Society talk at Govt Girls high school Irinjalakuda
- About Kuchipudi and how to tap your unattended potential for Govt High School, Puthukad

== Awards and recognition ==
Sreelakshmy has been the recipient of titles and honours such as ‘Kalashree’ from Kerala Sangeetha Nataka Akademi- state award, Binfeild Endowment from Narada Gana Sabha Chennai, Bharatham Yuva Kalakar, Kala Ratna, Singar Mani, Natya Ratna, and Nalanada Nrutya Nipuna. Sreelakshmy is an empanelled artiste in the ‘established’ category of Indian Council for Cultural Relations and a graded artiste of Doordarshan. Other than performing at various Indian dance festivals, she has performed on various international platforms in Netherlands, Australia, Italy, France, Germany, Switzerland, United Kingdom, United States, Colombia, Jordan and Gulf countries that has earned her rave reviews. She also performed in the presence of the Prime Minister of India, as the lead of the Kuchipudi team at the ‘Make In India’ program at Hannoer Messe, 2015 in Germany. She performed in the presence of the Prime Minister of India, as the lead of the Kuchipudi team at the ‘Make In India’ program at Hannoer Messe, 2015 in Germany. She was also invited to choreograph a confluence of Indian dance for the inaugural event of ‘Marhaba NaMo in Dubai’ where Prime Minister of India visited United Arab Emirates after 34 years.

== Full-length choreography and thematic productions and choreographs ==
- Soorpanakaha- Woodland spirits of the forest witness the life and plight of Soorpanakha. She is angry and frustrated, as her clan is nearly wiped out, her brother Ravana is gone, her land Lanka is finished but Rama and Lakshmana still lives. She recollects how naive she was to have gotten smitten by the human strangers in Dhandaka. She is angry that her innocence and sensuality was mocked by the brothers. She wonders, what wrong did she do to be physically deformed like this by the brothers? She throws back that question to the audience.
- Radhe- It revolves around the sweetest and most submitting of loves – that of Radha for Krishna. Radha is not mentioned by name in Srimad Bhagavatam but in the later texts, such as the Gita Govinda, the story of Radha gains precedence over other kinds of love. All knowing, all pervading Krishna is the Sutradhara of the whole world and especially the life in Vrindavana. Radhe is choreographed around the concept Manmatha Dasavastha which is basically psychoanalysis of the feelings and behaviour of different stages and situations of the subject when in an amorous phase. It beautifully describes, in detail, the progress of various psycho physical states of a Man or Woman in Love. After all, when he hides himself from her, she prays that “let her die in the fire that is created from her own being, out of her love for Krishna”.
- Sita Swayamvaram, a thematic production that adheres to the intricacies of Kuchipudi Yakshagana. This production was presented at Music Academy hall for Kalavardhini in Chennai.
- Silappatikaram, A full-length solo thematic work based on the Tamil epic Silapathikaram. The work anchors around the tale of two Nayikas Kannaki and Madhavi. It deals in depth the emotion and turmoil both the women go through in different segments of their life. When one was raised as Goddess the other renounced her worldly life and joined Buddhism. The work travels through Time, Cultural and Political Scenario, Dharma, Love, Anguish,
- Saptagiri Mountains gain immense significance in any civilization, owing to their massive presence, volume and much splendour they have to offer. In India, kshetras that are on mountain-tops also play a major role in the texture of the life on that mountain. Such mountains are considered sacred, as they have become abodes to the deities on them. One such deity is Lord Venkateswara and the unique feature of the lords abode is that it is not situated on one mountain, but on seven mountains that aligned in the shape of Adiseshu, the divine serpent. The Saptagiri have gained a place of highest importance in Andhra Pradesh, and the Lord of Kali Yuga is revered like none other. Saptagiri brings to dance the legend, history and importance of these hills. The presentation Sapta Giri is a confluence of legend, history and present.
- Poothana Moksham is one of Sreelakshmy's most critically acclaimed choreographies based on the story of Poothana. Here she interprets the character of Poothana as a woman who gets mesmerized with the happiness of Vrindavana and forgets her intention for being there. A motherly instinct in her arouse when she meets baby Krishna but she realizes that she has no choice but to kill the baby. In the end Lord Krishnan takes her Prana and delivers her Moksha.
- Mandodari Sabdham is the story of the princess Mandodari and Ravana, the ruler of Lanka. It is the story of a frog that turns into a beautiful woman. Ravana was taken by the beauty of her and propose her to marry him. Mandodari Sabdham is a traditional sabdham and has been re-choreographed by Sreelakshmy.
- Rama Margam is a repertoire based on the epic Ramayana.
- Madhura Vamsi- A repertoire that is built around the Murali of Krishna.
