= Sheila Bhatia =

Indian poet and playwright(1916 - 2008)

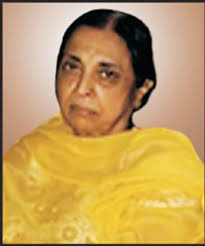
- Born: 1 March 1916; Sialkot, British India
- Died: 17 February 2008 (aged 91); India
- Occupations: Poet, playwright, theatre personality
- Known for: Punjabi opera
- Awards: Padma Shri; Sangeet Natak Akademi Award; Punjabi Academy Param Sahit Sarkar Sanman; Delhi Administration Award; Ghalib Award; Punjabi Arts Council Award; DA Best Director Award; Urdu Academy Award; Kalidas Samman; Param Sahit Sarkar Sanman

Sheila Bhatia (1 March 1916 – 17 February 2008) was an Indian poet, playwright, theatre personality and the founder of the Delhi Art Theatre, a forum based in Delhi for the promotion of Indian art forms. She is credited with originating Punjabi opera, an Indian form of dance drama incorporating operatic movements. She was honoured by the Government of India in 1971 with Padma Shri, the fourth highest Indian civilian award. A decade later, she received the Sangeet Natak Akademi Award for theatre direction in 1982 followed by Kalidas Samman in 1997.

== Early life and education ==
Sheila Bhatia was born on 1 March 1916 in Sialkot in British India, in present-day Pakistan. After securing a BA degree, she graduated in education (BT) and started working as a teacher of mathematics in Lahore, involving herself with the Indian freedom struggle.

== Career ==
After involving in Indian freedom struggle, she moved to Delhi where she founded the Delhi Art Theatre. She also worked with the National School of Drama as the head of the acting department. Bhatia's debut production was Call of the Valley, a musical. That was followed by over 60 productions, such as Heer Ranjha (1957), Dard Aayega Dabe Paon (1979), Sulgada Darya (1982), Omar Khayyam (1990), Naseeb (1997), Chann Badla Da, Loha Kutt, Ghalib Kaun tha and Nadir Shah in Punabi and Qissa yeh aurat ka (1972), Hawa se hippy tak (1972), and Yeh ishq nahin asan (1980) in Urdu. A follower of Faiz Ahmed Faiz, Bhatia also has 10 publications to her credit including the poetry anthology, Parlo Da Jhakkarh (1950).

== Awards ==
The Government of India awarded her the civilian honour of Padma Shri in 1971. She received the Sangeet Natak Akademi Award for best direction in 1982. The next year, she was awarded the Ghalib Award (1983) followed by Punjabi Arts Council award. She received the best director award from the Delhi Administration in 1986 and the Kalidas Samman in 1997. She was also a recipient of Urdu Academy Award and the Param Sahit Sarkar Sanman by the Punjabi Academy (2000).

== Death ==
Sheila Bhatia died on 17 February 2008 at the age of 91.

== See also ==
- National School of Drama

== Bibliography ==
- Susie J. Tharu, Ke Lalita (1993). Women Writing in India: The twentieth century. Feminist Press. p. 688. ISBN 9781558610293.
- Ananda Lal, ed. (2004). The Oxford Companion to Indian Theatre. Oxford University Press. ISBN 9780195644463.
