= Vishwa Bharati Award =

Vishwa Bharati Award is the highest award of the Indian state of Uttar Pradesh Sanskrit Sansthan in Lucknow. It is awarded to leading contributors in the field of literature in Sanskrit, Pali and Prakrat.

In 2014 the prize rose to ₹5,00,000

== Recipients ==
- 2009 : Prof. Adya Prasad (Allahabad)
- 2010 : Prof. Vashishtha Tripathi (Allahabad)
- 2011 : Prof. Kishor Nath Jha (Madhubani, Bihar)
- 2012 : Dr. Girdhar Lal Mishra (Varanasi)
- 2013 : Dr. Bhagirath Prasad Tripathi (Varanasi )
- 2014; Acharya Ram Yatna Shukla
- 2015 : Prof. Abhiraj Rajendra Mishra
- 2016 : Jagannath Pathak
