= Perini Sivatandavam =

Folk dance from Telangana

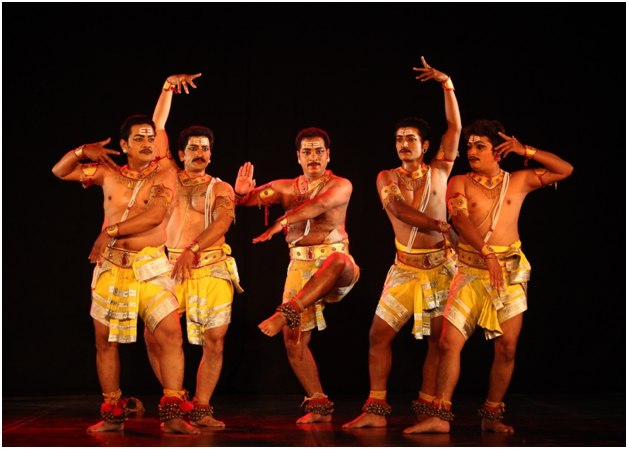
Tandavam Scene

Perini Shivathandavam (Perini Śivatāṇḍavam) or Perini Thandavam is an ancient dance form from Telangana which has been revived in recent time. It prospered during the Kakatiya dynasty. Perini is performed in honour of Lord Shiva, the Hindu God and it is believed that in ancient times this was performed before the soldiers set to war. Nataraja Ramakrishna revived the art form by studying old manuscripts and sculptures at Ramappa Temple.

== The dance ==
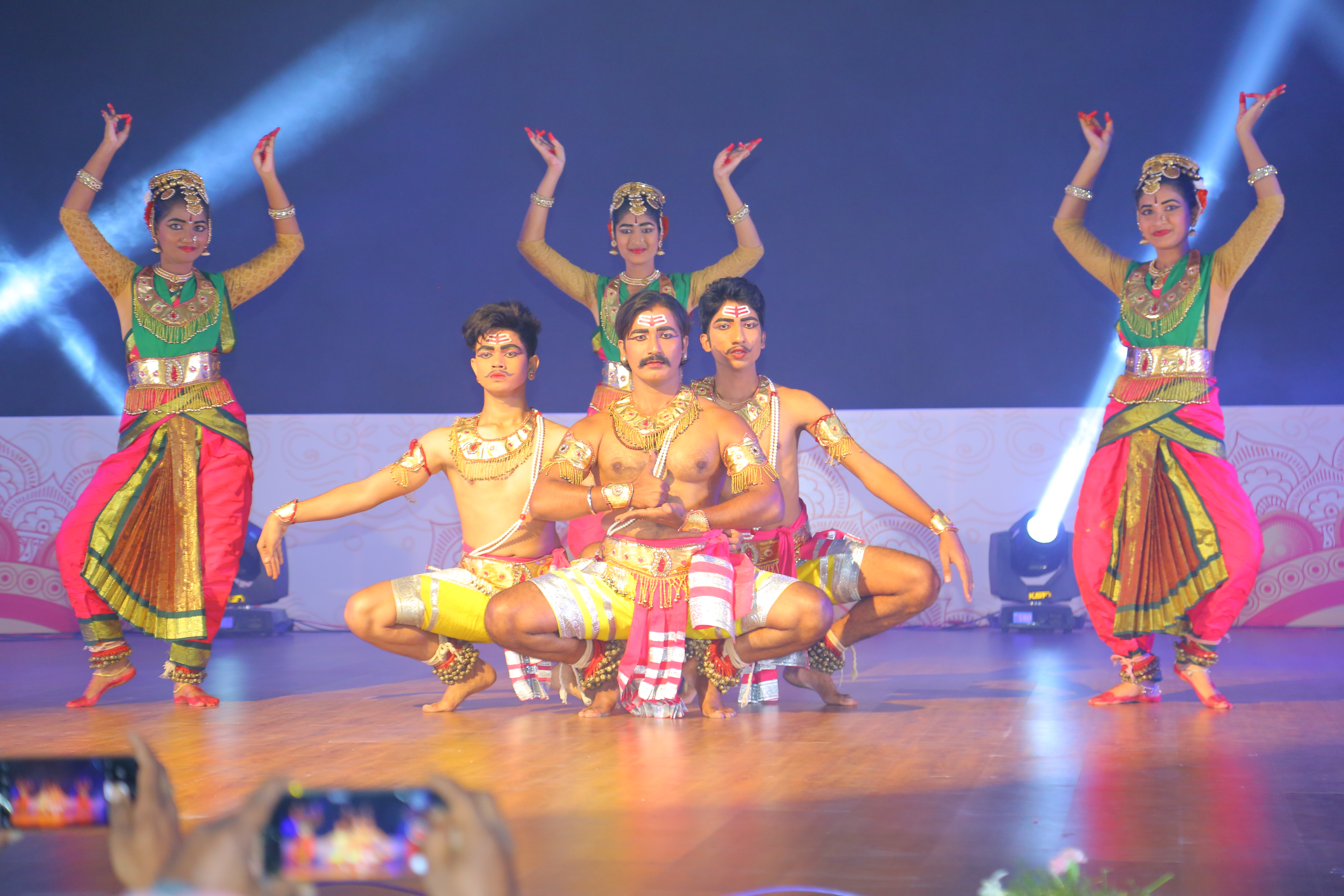
Perini dance performance during the cultural celebrations organized by Department of Language and Culture, Government of Telangana on December 15, 2019, during the inauguration of Mahathi Auditorium, Gajwel.

Perini Shivathandavam (Perini Śivatāṇḍavam) or Perini Thandavam is an ancient dance form from Telangana. It is a dance form usually performed by males. It is called 'Dance of Warriors'. Warriors before leaving to the battlefield enact this dance before the idol of Lord Shiva. The dance form, Perini, reached its pinnacle during the rule of the Kakatiyas who established their dynasty at Warangal and ruled for almost two centuries. The dance form is mentioned in the Sanskrit text Nrttya Ratnavali of Jayapa Senani. Based on its complex parts and myths, it is believed that the dance form developed for a long time before it.

It is believed that this dance form invokes 'Prerana' (inspiration) and is dedicated to the supreme dancer, Lord Shiva. One can find evidence of this dance in the sculptures near Garbha Gudi (Sanctum Sanctorum) of the Ramappa Temple at Warangal. Poet Srinatha mentioned in his Bhimeswara Puranam that Prerani as one of the dances being offered as Ragabhoga to the Lord Bhimeswara of Draksharama.

Perini is a vigorous dance done to the resounding beats of drums. Dancers drive themselves to a state of mental abstraction where they feel the power of Shiva in their bodies. While dancing they invoke Shiva to come into him and dance through him. The dance was also performed on special platforms in front of temples. Perini dance form almost disappeared after the decline of the Kakatiya dynasty but Dr. Nataraja Ramakrishna brought a renaissance in Perini dance. He revived the art form by studying old manuscripts and sculptures at Ramappa Temple

== See also ==
- Tandava
