= Kuchipudi, Krishna district =

Kuchipudi
- Village
- Interactive map of Kuchipudi
- Location in Andhra Pradesh, India Kuchipudi (India)
- Coordinates: 16.2570°N 80.9126°E
- Country: India
- State: Andhra Pradesh
- District: Krishna

Area
  - Total: 2.57 km^{2} (0.99 sq mi)

Population (2011)
  - Total: 3,941
  - Density: 1,530/km^{2} (3,970/sq mi)

Languages
  - Official: Telugu
- Time zone: UTC+5:30 (IST)
- PIN: 521135
- Telephone code: +91–08671

Kuchipudi is a village in Krishna district of the Indian state of Andhra Pradesh. It is also known as Kuchelapuram or Kuchilapuri. It is the origin of the eponymous dance form Kuchipudi, one of the eight major Indian classical dances. It is one of the villages in the Movva mandal to be a part of Andhra Pradesh Capital Region.

== Geography ==
This place is the border of Krishna district and Guntur district. Kollur is towards west of the village. It is located in Movva mandal of Machilipatnam revenue division.

== Education ==
Sri Siddhendra Yogi Kala Pitham in the village is one of the eight schools under Potti Sreeramulu Telugu University, renowned for the dance form of Kuchipudi.

== History ==
Siddhendra Yogi Kala Peetham, one of the eight schools of Potti Sreeramulu Telugu University is situated in Kuchipudi. The Kuchipudi dance was evolved by Siddhendra Yogi.

== Transport ==
Machilipatnam is the nearest town to Kuchipudi, 24 kilometres (15 mi) away.

== See also ==
- Villages in Movva mandal
