= Kala Ratna =

Indian award given by Andhra Pradesh state government

- Civilian Award
- Sponsored by: Government of Andhra Pradesh
- Reward: ₹50,000
- First award: 1999
- Final award: 2017
- Website: apculturedept.com

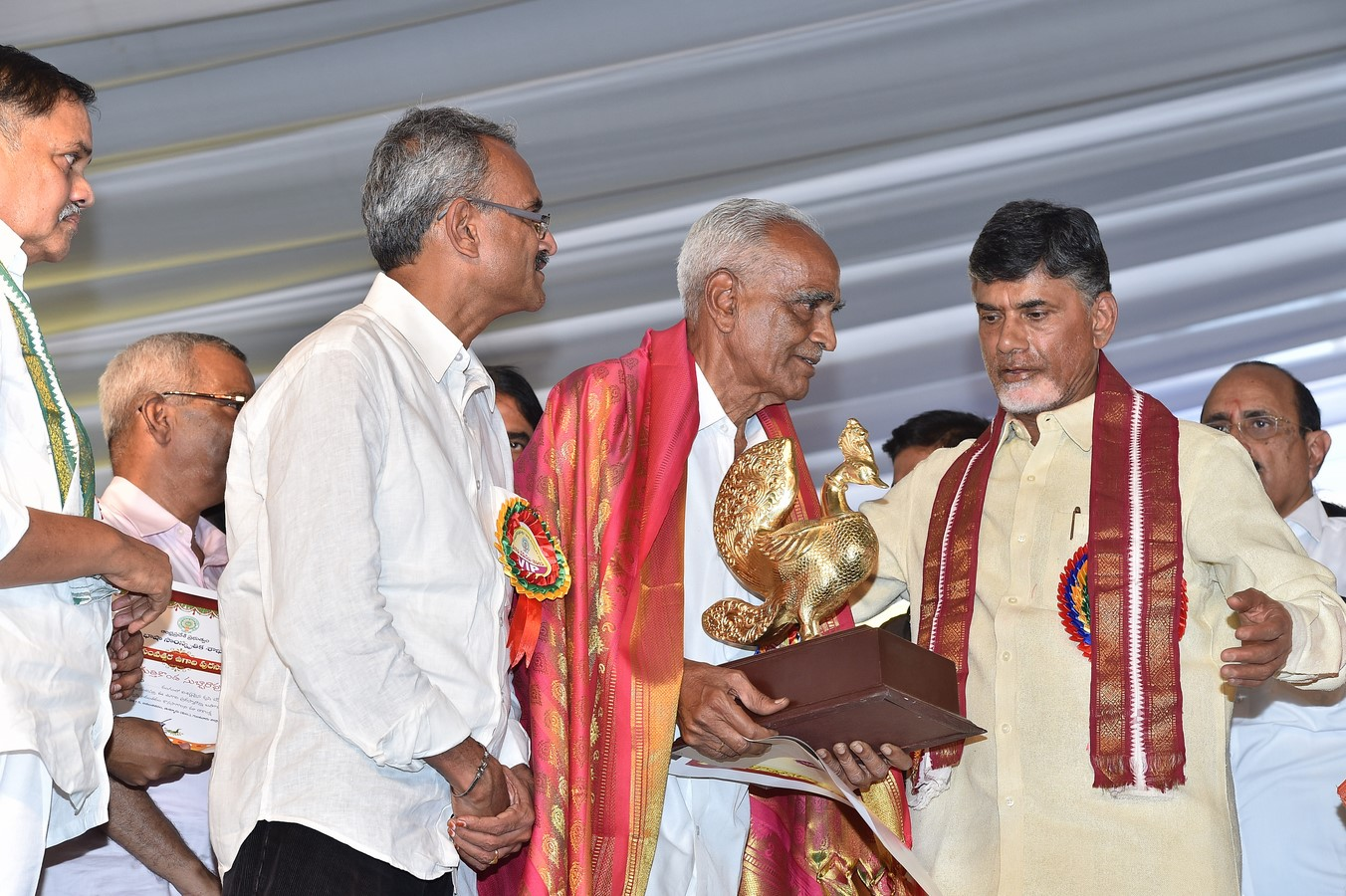
Lanka Suryanarayana receives Kala Ratna from the Andhra Pradesh Government

The Kala Ratna (Telugu: కళారత్న) earlier Hamsa Award, is a civilian honour of the Andhra Pradesh state are conferred annually by the Government of Andhra Pradesh and is organised by the State Cultural Council and Department of Culture on the occasion of Telugu new year, Ugadi. The awards celebrate achievements by persons of eminence in their chosen fields. The awardees are from the fields of literature, music, dance, painting, sculpture, folk and tribal arts. Along with Kala Ratna awards, the Andhra Pradesh government presents Ugadi Puraskarams on the same stage.

== The Award ==
The awards are presented by the Chief Minister of Andhra Pradesh. Each award carries an amount of Rs. 50,000, a shawl, a gold plated Hamsa (Swan) memento.

== Award winners ==
=== 2015 Awards ===
The Government of Andhra Pradesh announced 32 names for the year 2015.

=== 2016 Awards ===
The Government of Andhra Pradesh announced 23 names for the year 2016.

=== 2017 Awards ===
The Government of Andhra Pradesh announced 38 names for the year 2017.
