= Vempati Chinna Satyam =

Indian Kuchipudi dancer (1929–2012)

- Born: Vempati Chinna Satyanarayana; 15 October 1929; Kuchipudi, Andhra Pradesh
- Died: 29 July 2012 (aged 82); Chennai, Tamil Nadu
- Occupation: Classical Indian Dancer
- Awards: Padma Bhushan: 1998; Sangeet Natak Akademi Fellowship: 1967
- Website: http://www.kuchipudi.com

Vempati Chinna Satyam (15 October 1929 – 29 July 2012) was an Indian dancer and a guru of the Kuchipudi dance form.

Chinna Satyam was born in a Brahmin family at Kuchipudi, Andhra Pradesh. He was taught by Vedantam Lakshmi Narayana Sastry. He refined his art by learning from Sri Tadepally Perrayya Sastry and later was trained by his elder brother Vempati Pedda Satyam in expressions. As he learned the nuances of Kuchipudi, he propagated this dance form all over the world. He died of old age-related problems on 29 July 2012. He was 83.

== Dance ==
Chinna Satyam sublimated and systematised Indian Kuchipudi dance, giving it a more classical basis. He refined the art form, bringing it closer to the standards of Natya Shastra and introduced new elements, e.g. chari (leg movements) of Natya Shastra that are significantly different from the interpretations of other dance authorities, such as Padma Subrahmanyam. Previously, it had been considered a "rustic" (folk) form of dance.

Operas
Padmavati Srinivasa Kalyanam
Vipranarayana Charitam
Menaka Viswamitra
Sakuntalam
Bhama Kalapam
Chandalika
Rukmini Kalyanam
Hara Vilasam
Siva Dhanurbhangam (Ramayanam)

== Kuchipudi Art Academy ==
Chinna Satyam started the Kuchipudi Art Academy at Madras in 1963. The Academy has to its credit more than 180 solo items and 15 dance dramas composed and choreographed by Satyam. These solo items and dramas have been staged all over India and abroad. He composed his first dance drama, Sri Krishna Parijatham, in the same period, followed by another hit, Ksheera Sagara Madanam, and played the lead role. His portrayal of Lord Shiva and his choreography were well received.

He has trained many stalwarts in the Kuchipudi Dance form. Bala Kondala Rao, Shoba Naidu, Rathna Kumar, Manju Bhargavee, Vyjayanthimala, Hema Malini, Sasikala Penumarti, and Jaikishore Mosalikanti are among his prime disciples who spread his legacy in the dance field.

== Awards and honours ==
Vempati Chinna Satyam was conferred with many titles and awards such as "Sangeet Peeth of Bombay", "Asthana Natyacharya of Tirumala Tirupati Devasthanam", "T.T.K. Memorial Award" by Madras Music Academy, "Natya Kalasaagara of Waltair", "Raja-Lakshmi Award of Madras", "Kalaprapoorna" from Andhra University, "Natya Kala Bhushana of Guntur", "Bharatha Kalaprapoorna of Hyderabad", D. Litt. from Sri Venkateswara University, "Asthana Natyacharya of Pittsburgh", and "National Award from Central Sangeet Naatak Akademi, New Delhi". He was awarded by many state governments of India such as Kalidas Puraskar by the Government of Madhya Pradesh and Kalaimamani by the Government of Tamil Nadu. He was honored with a doctorate degree from Andhra University. He was also awarded the Padma Bhushan by the Government of India.
