= Kuchipudi =

Indian classical dance

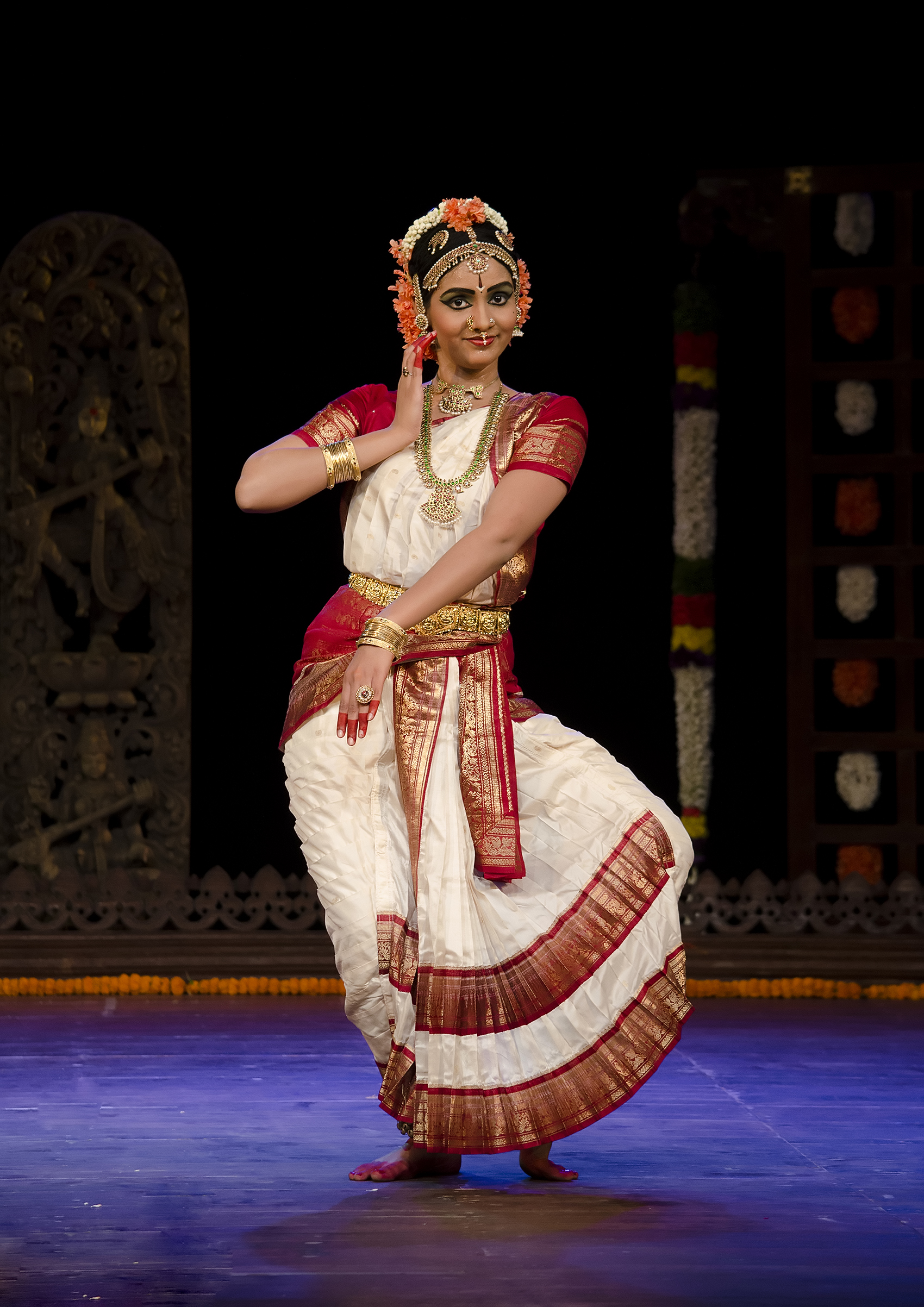
- Genre: Indian classical dance
- Instruments: Mridangam; Cymbals; Veena; Flute; Tambura
- Origin: Kuchipudi, Krishna district, Andhra Pradesh

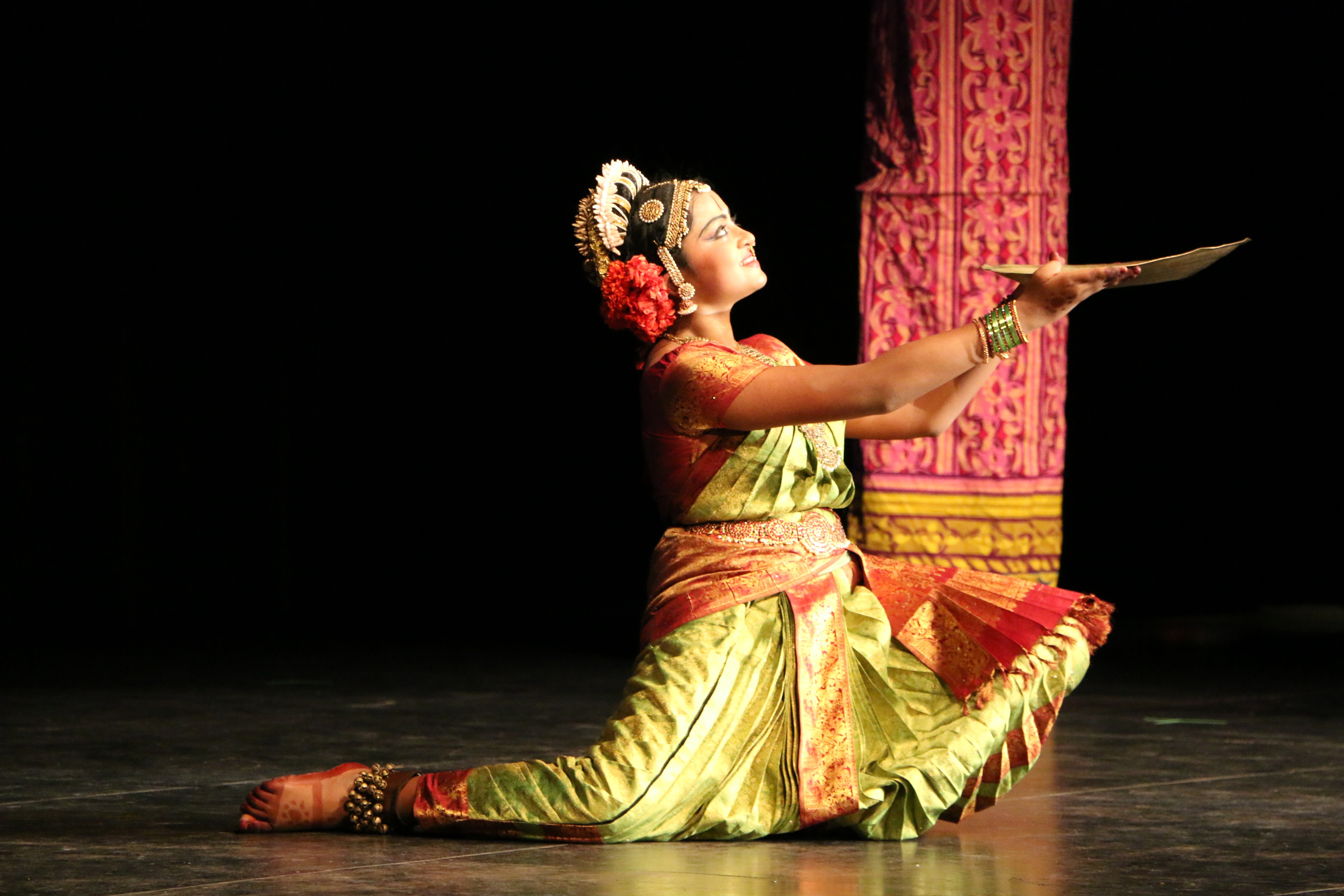
Dancer performing a tarangam

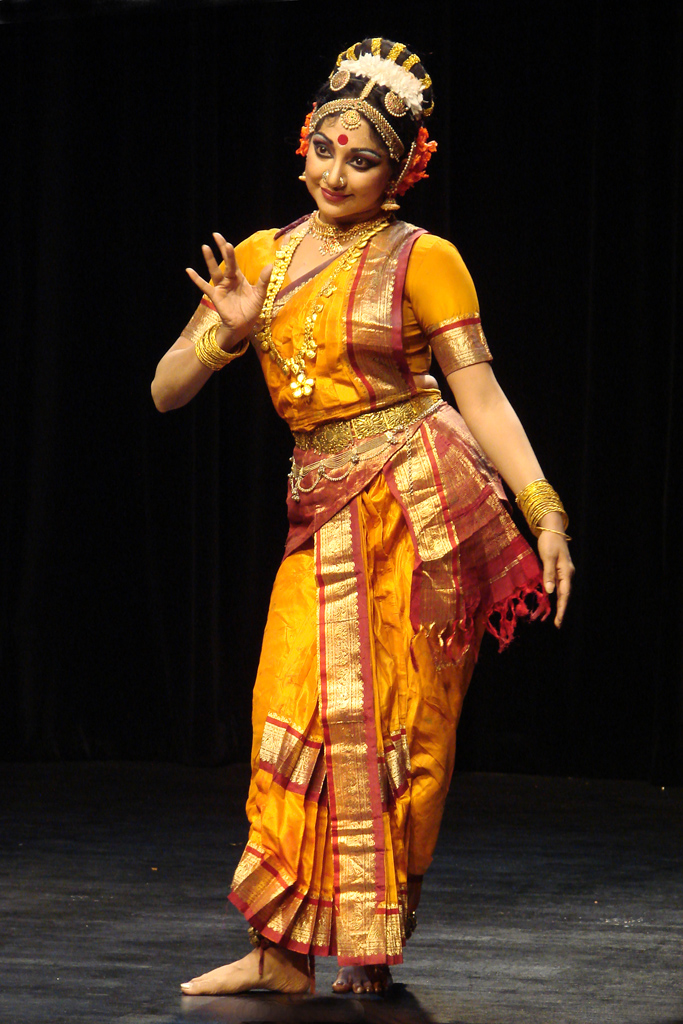
A Kuchipudi hasta (mudra).

Kuchipudi (/ˌkuːtʃɪˈpuːdi/ KOO-chih-POO-dee) is one of the eight major Indian classical dance forms. It originated in Kuchipudi, a village in the Indian state of Andhra Pradesh. Kuchipudi is a dance-drama performance, with its roots in the ancient Hindu Sanskrit text of Natya Shastra (c. 500 BCE—500 CE). It developed as a religious art linked to traveling bards, temples and spiritual beliefs, like all major classical dances of India.

Evidence of Kuchipudi's existence in an older version is found in copper inscriptions of the 10th century, and by the 15th century in texts such as the Machupalli Kaifat. Kuchipudi tradition holds that Narahari Tirtha – a sanyassin of Dvaita Vedanta persuasion, and his orphaned disciple, Siddhendra Yogi, founded and systematized the modern version of Kuchipudi in the 17th century. Kuchipudi largely developed as a Krishna-oriented Vaishnavism tradition, and is known as Bhagavata Mela in Thanjavur.

In the past, an all male troupe performed the traditional Kuchipudi. A dancer in a male role would be in Agnivastra, also known as Bagalbandi, wear a dhoti (a single pleated piece of cloth hanging down from the waist). A dancer in a female role would wear a Sari with light makeup. The Kuchipudi performance usually begins with an invocation. Then, each costumed actor is introduced, their role stated, and they perform a short preliminary dance set to music (daravu). Next, the performance presents pure dance (nritta). This is followed with by the expressive part of the performance (nritya), where rhythmic hand gestures help convey the story. Vocal and instrumental Carnatic music in the Telugu language accompanies the performance. The typical musical instruments in Kuchipudi are mridangam, cymbals, veena, flute and the tambura. The popularity of Kuchipudi has grown within India and it is performed worldwide.

== Nomenclature, orthography and etymology ==
Kuchipudi is named after the village in Krishna district of Andhra Pradesh named Kuchipudi – shortened form of the full name Kuchelapuram or Kuchilapuri – where it developed. The name of the village, states Ragini Devi, is itself derived from Sanskrit Kusilava-puram, which means "the village of actors". Kusilava is a term found in ancient Sanskrit texts and refers to "traveling bard, dancer, newsmonger".

== History ==
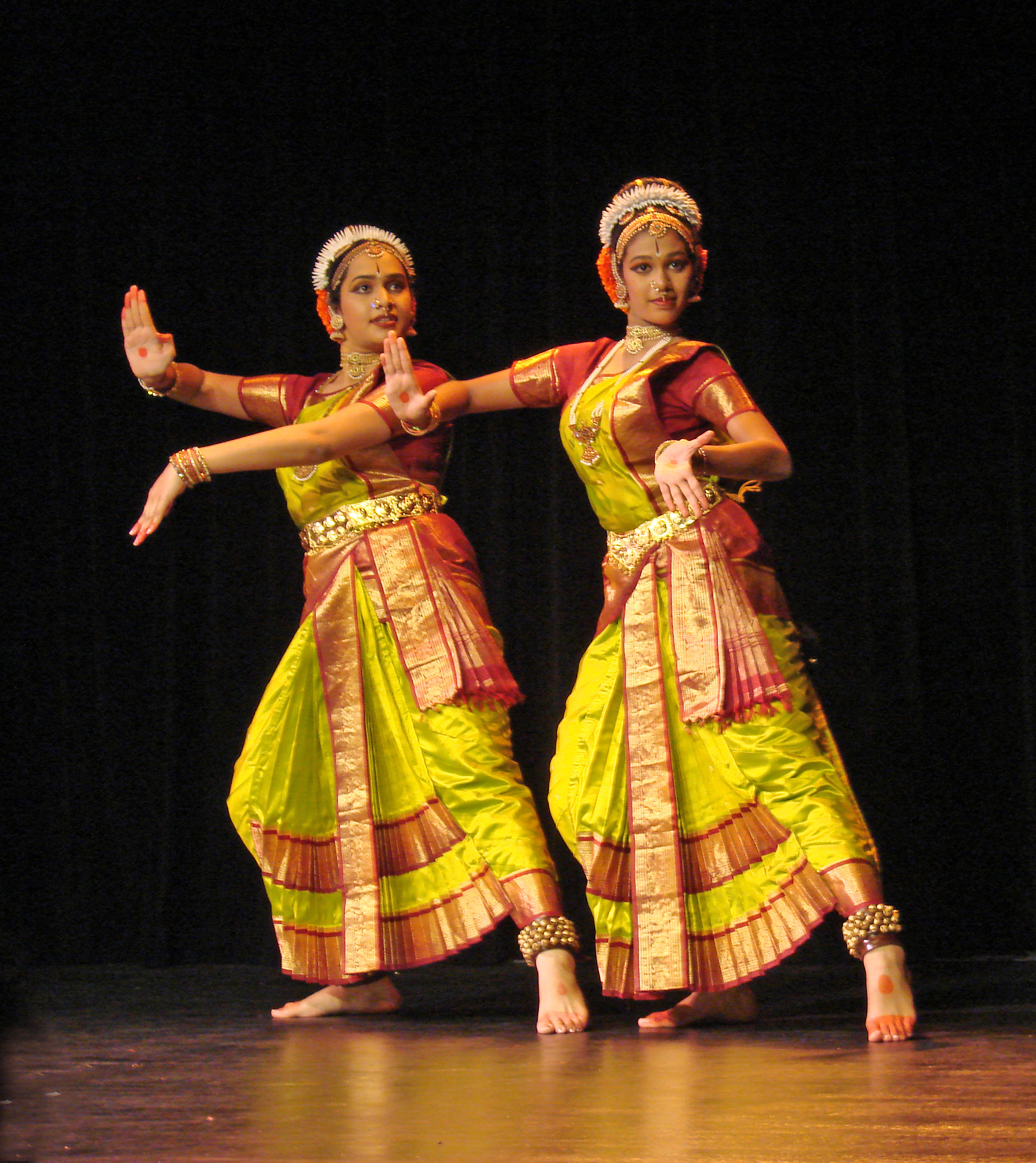
Kuchipudi dancers performing in Paris

Like other classical dance forms in India, Kuchipudi traces its roots to the Sanskrit Natya Shastra, a foundational treatise on the performing arts. Its first complete compilation is dated to between 200 BCE and 200 CE, but estimates vary between 500 BCE and 500 CE. The most studied version of the Natya Shastra text consists of about 6000 verses structured into 36 chapters. The text, states Natalia Lidova, describes the theory of Tāṇḍava dance (Shiva), the theory of rasa, of bhāva, expression, gestures, acting techniques, basic steps, standing postures – all of which are part of Indian classical dances. Dance and performance arts, states this ancient text, are a form of expression of spiritual ideas, virtues, and the essence of scriptures.

The dance-drama tradition in Andhra Pradesh is of ancient origins, and the region is mentioned in the Natya Shastra. Bharata Muni credits a graceful movement to the Andhra region and discusses it as Kaishiki vritti. The pre-2nd century CE text calls one raga Andhri, which is from Andhra. The Andhri, is related to Gandhari and Arsabhi, and is discussed in many other 1st millennium Sanskrit texts. Some, state Bruno Nettle and others, place the origins of Kuchipudi to 3rd-century BCE.

Dance-drama performance arts related to Shaivism, in Telugu-speaking parts of South India, are evidenced in 10th-century copper inscriptions, and these were called Brāhmana Mēlamulu or Brahma Mēlamulu. The medieval era dance-drama performance artists were Brahmins. This art was likely adopted by the musical and dancing Bhakti traditions of Vaishnavism which grew in the 2nd millennium, whose devotees were called Bhāgavatulu in Andhra region and Bhāgavatār in Tamil region of south India. In Andhra, this performance art evolved into Kuchipudi, while in Tamil Nadu it became known as Bhāgavata Mēla Nāṭaka. According to Saskia Kersenboom, both the Telugu Kuchipudi and Tamil Bhagavata Mela are strongly related to the classical Hindu dance tradition of Yakṣagāna found in Karnataka, all three involve Carnatic music, but these dance-drama traditions have differences such as in costumes, structure, interpretation and creative innovations.

Kuchipudi traces its origins to its founder Narahari Tirtha, the disciple of Sri Ananda Tirtha a.k.a. Madhvacharya, when he was the high priest at his matha at Srikurmam and Simhachalam. To implant bhakti among layman he is credited with organizing Bhagavata Melas throughout the nights and adapting many dance forms from the Srimad Bhagavatha Puranas. Vaishnavism received a big boost in the Kalinga regions of Andhra and Orissa due to the efforts of Narahari Tirtha, Sri Jagannatha Tirtha and his disciples, the message of Bhakti was percolated through the masses via Kuchpudi and The Bhagavata Melas of Sri Narahari Tirtha and his disciples.

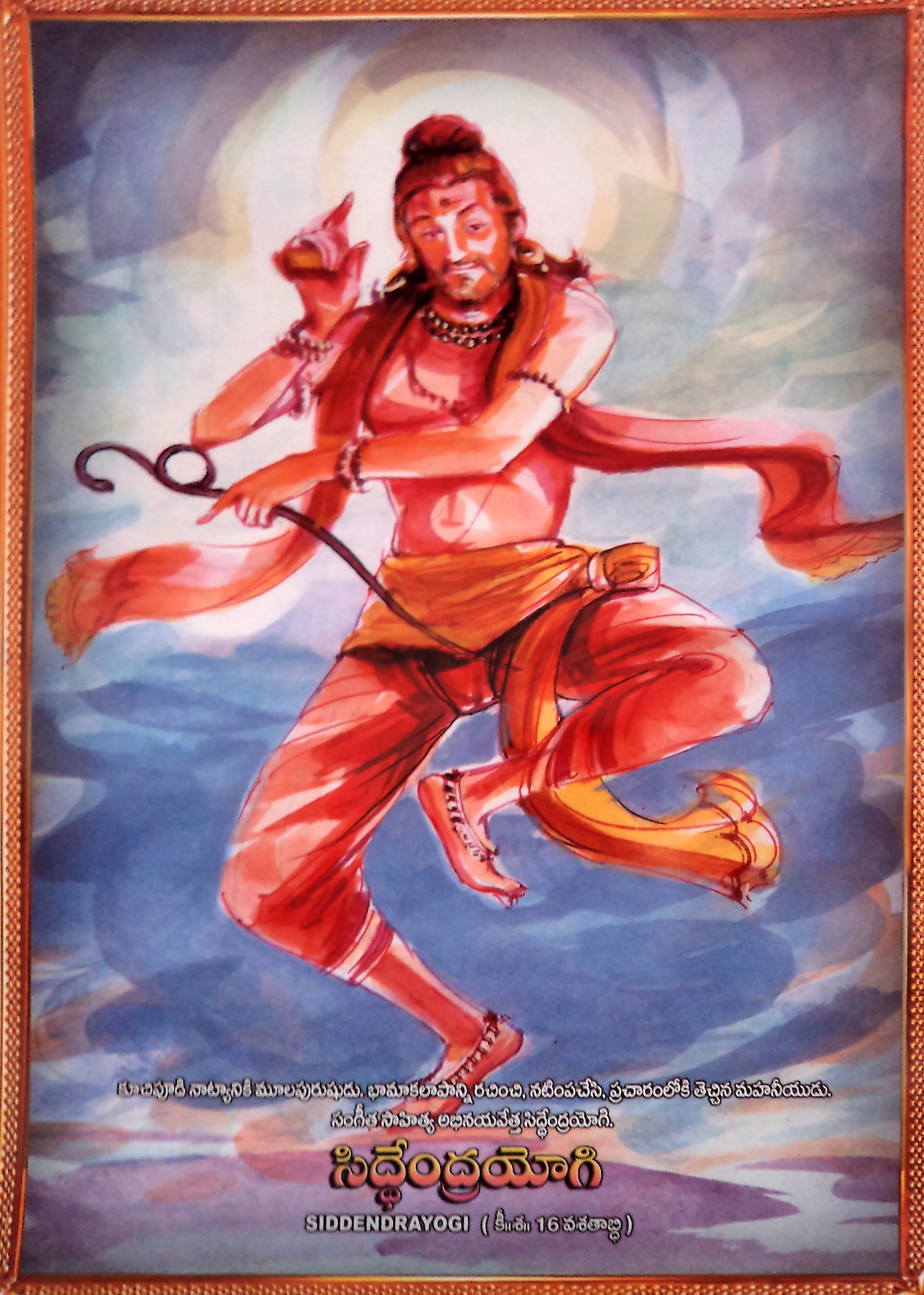
A portrait of Siddhendra Yogi, to whom modern Kuchipudi is traditionally attributed.

According to Manohar Varadpande, the Kuchipudi dance emerged in the late 13th century, when Ganga rulers from Kalinga were patrons of performance arts based on the 12th-century Sanskrit scholar Jayadeva, particularly the Gita Govinda. This royal sponsorship, states Varadpande, encouraged many poets and dance-drama troupes to adopt Radha-Krishna themes into the then prevailing versions of classical Kuchipudi. These were regionally called Vaishnava Bhagavatulu.

The modern version of Kuchipudi is attributed to Tirtha Narayanayati, a 17th-century Telugu sanyasin of Advaita Vedanta persuasion and particularly his disciple, a Telugu Brahmin orphan named Sidhyendra Yogi. (Note: His name is sometimes spelled Siddhendra Yogi.) Tirtha Narayanayati authored Sri Krishna Leela Tarangini and introduced sequences of rhythmic dance syllables at the end of the cantos, he wrote this work as a libretto for a dance-drama. Narayanayati lived for a while in the Tanjore district and presented the dance-drama in the Tanjore temple.

Narayanayati's disciple, Sidhyendra Yogi, followed up with another play, the Parijatapaharana, (Note: Parijatapaharana means "The Stealing of the Parijata Flower".) more commonly known as the Bhama Kalapam. (Note: There are three versions of the story. In the first, Lord Krishna appears before Sidhyendra and promises moksha if he told this love epic. In another, Sidhyendra promises Krishna to dedicate his life to bhakti if his life was saved during a dangerous river-crossing. In the third, Sidhyendra was simply inspired by his devotion and love for God to compose the work. The Parijatapaharana tells the story of how Rukmini asked Krishna to get her the Parijata tree from the garden of the god Indra and Satyabhama's jealousy as a result.) When Sidhyendra Yogi finished the play, he had trouble finding suitable performers. So he went to Kuchelapuram, the village of his wife's family and present-day Kuchipudi, where he enlisted a group of young Brahmin boys to perform the play. According to the tradition, Sidhyendra requested and the villagers agreed to perform the play once a year, and this came to be known as Kuchipudi.

=== Late medieval period ===
Kuchipudi enjoyed support from medieval era rulers. Copper inscriptions suggest that the dance-drama was seen by the royalty and was influential by 1502 and through the late 16th century. The court records of the Vijayanagara Empire – known for its patronage of the arts – indicate that drama-dance troupes of Bhagavatas from Kuchipudi village performed at the royal court. However, various historical inscriptions often indicate that this dance form can be tracked back to the first century BCE.

The region saw wars and political turmoil with Islamic invasions and the formation of Deccan Sultanates in the 16th century. With the fall of Vijayanagara Empire and the destruction of temples and Deccan cities by the Muslim army around 1565, musicians and dance-drama artists migrated south, and Tanjore kingdom records suggest some 500 such Kuchipudi artist families arrived from Andhra, were welcomed and granted land by the Hindu king Achyutappa Nayak, a settlement that grew to become modern Melattur near Tanjore (also called Thanjavur). Not everyone left the old Andhra village of Kuchipudi, and those remaining became the sole custodians of its tradition in Andhra.

Kuchipudi declined and was a dying art in 17th-century Andhra, but in 1678, the last Shia Muslim Sultan of Golkonda, Abul Hasan Tana Shah, saw a Kuchipudi performance and was so pleased that he granted the dancers lands around the Kuchipudi village, with the stipulation that they continue the dance-drama. The Shia Sultanate was overthrown in 1687 by the Sunni Mughal Emperor Aurangzeb. In order to regulate public and private morals, as well as end un-Islamic practices, Aurangzeb banned public performances of all music and dance arts, along with ordering the confiscation and destruction of musical instruments in Indian subcontinent under control of his Mughal Empire.

=== Colonial rule period ===
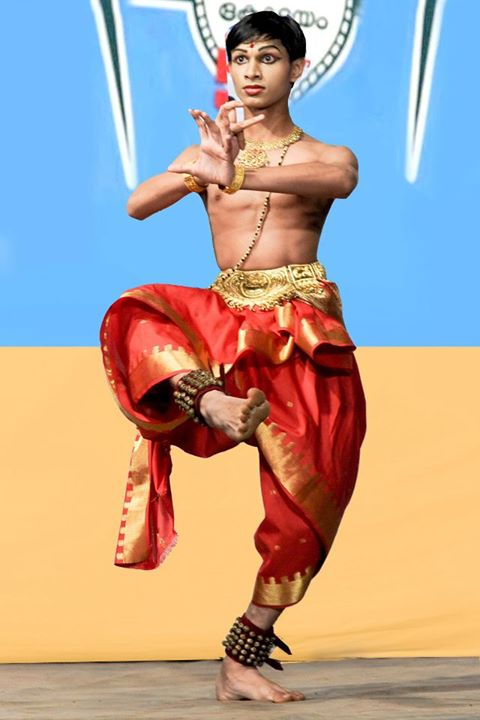
A Kuchipudi dance in progress.

After the death of Aurangzeb in 1707, the Mughal Empire collapsed, Hindu rebellion sprouted in many parts of India, including the Deccan region. In the second half of the 18th century, during this period of political turmoil, the colonial Europeans arrived, the Madras Presidency was formed by the East India Company officials and became a part of the British Empire. Andhra was a part of the Madras Presidency. During the colonial era, Hindu arts and traditions such as dance-drama were ridiculed. Christian missionaries and British officials stereotyped and denigrated dancers, calling Indian classical dances as evidence of a tradition of "harlots, debased erotic culture, slavery to idols and priests". Christian missionaries launched the "anti-dance movement" in 1892, to ban all such dance forms. The anti-dance camp accused the various classical Indian dance forms as a front for prostitution, while revivalists questioned the constructed histories by the colonial writers.

In 1910, the Madras Presidency of the British Empire altogether banned temple dancing. Kuchipudi, which was traditionally staged at night on a stage attached to a Hindu temple, was impacted and like all classical Indian dances declined during the colonial rule period.

After the ban, many Indians protested against the caricature and cultural discrimination, launching their efforts to preserve and reinvigorate their culture. Due to these efforts from 1920s onwards, the classical Indian dances witnessed a period of renaissance. Vedantam Lakshminarayana Sastri (1886–1956) was the influential figure who led the effort to save, reconstruct and revive Kuchipudi performance art. Sastri worked closely with other revivalists, between 1920 and 1950, particularly Balasaraswati and others determined to save and revive Bharatanatyam.

=== Modern period ===
The three influential figures in Kuchipudi, during the first half of twentieth century, were Vedantam Lakshminarayana Sastri, Vempati Venkatanarayana Sastri and Chinta Venkataramayya. Sastri focused on reviving and relaunching Kuchipudi after classical Hindu dances came under sustained ridicule and political degradation in the British Raj, while Venkataramayya was influential in productions for public performances and developing specialized forms of Yakshagana – another classical Indian dance, and Kuchipudi. Sastri is also remembered for encouraging and teaching Indian women to dance Kuchipudi as solo performers and in teams, as well as working with artists of other classical dances such as the Bharatanatyam that enabled the sharing and cross flow of ideas. Vempati Venkatanarayana Sastri was the guru of Sastri, taught him Kuchipudi, and was a key figure in helping preserve Kuchipudi. The historic All India Dance Seminar, organized by the national arts organization Sangeet Natak Akademi in 1958, thrust Kuchipudi to the national stage.

Some Western dancers joined the Indians in preserving dance. The American dancer Esther Sherman, for example, moved to India in 1930, learnt Indian classical dances, changed her name to Ragini Devi, and joined the movement to save and revive classical Indian dances. Her daughter Indrani Bajpai (Indrani Rahman) learnt and became a celebrated Kuchipudi dancer. The public performances of Kuchipudi by Indrani Rahman and Yamini Krishnamurti outside of Andhra region, created wider enthusiasm and more interest through new students and the expansion of Kuchipudi as a creative performance art both within India and internationally. The latter half of the twentieth century was dominated by the Kuchipudi school of Vempati Chinna Satyam, whose efforts to further codify the modern repertoire earned him multiple accolades, including the Padma Bhushan. Chinna Satyam's senior disciples, like Bala Kondala Rao, Manju Bhargavi, Shobha Naidu, and Yamini Krishnamurthy, started teaching the art form and contributed to spreading it worldwide.

The largest group performance with a total of 6,117 dancers in Vijayawada got into the Guinness World Records

== Repertoire ==
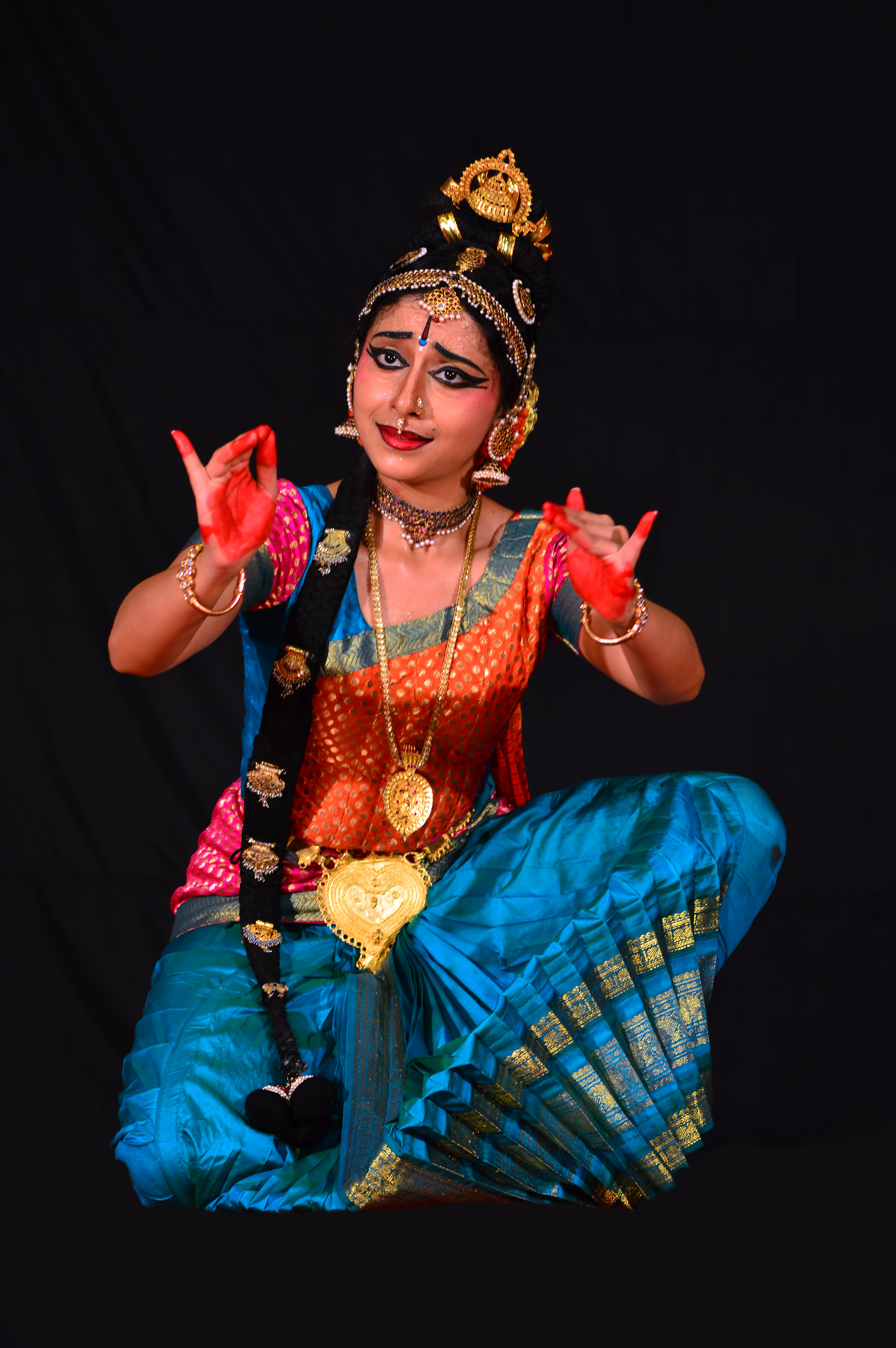
A dancer in a costume, an expressive part of a Kuchipudi performance.

Kuchipudi is a team performance with roots in Hindu religious festivals. The drama-dance involves extensive stage movements and exacting footwork, wherein the underlying drama is mimed by expressive gestures of hand (mudras), eye and face movements. The expressive style is through a sign language that follows the classical pan-Indian Sanskrit texts such as Natya Shastra, Abhinaya Darpana and Nrityararnavali. The dance is accompanied with Carnatic music, while the recital is in Telugu language. Just like the Carnatic music style, Kuchipudi shares many postures and expressive gestures with Bharatanatyam, such as the Ardhamandali or Aramadi (half seating position or a partial squat, legs bent or knees flexed out). However, there are important differences, such as Bharatanatyam as a Hindu temple tradition trending towards geometric perfection and the spiritual, while Kuchipudi as a Hindu festival tradition trending towards more sensual supple and the folksy.

Traditionally the traveling dance troupe consisted entirely of men (often Brahmins), who moved from village to village and performed on a stage set next to a Hindu temple. The male artists would dress up and act out the female role in a drama performed by these traveling troupes. In modern times, Kuchipudi has diversified, women have joined Kuchipudi dance, outnumber male artists, and are among its most celebrated artists. In some cases now, it is the Kuchipudi girl artists who dress up and act out the role of boys.

The repertoire of Kuchipudi, like all major classical Indian dance forms, follows the three categories of performance in the ancient Hindu text Natya Shastra. These are Nritta, Nritya and Natya.

- The Nritta performance is the abstract, fast, and rhythmic aspect of the dance. The viewer is presented with pure movement in Nritta, wherein the emphasis is the beauty in motion, form, speed, range, and pattern. This part of the repertoire has no interpretive aspect, no telling of a story. It is a technical performance and aims to engage the senses (prakriti) of the audience.
- The Nritya is the slower and expressive aspect of the dance that attempts to communicate feelings and storylines particularly with spiritual themes in Hindu dance traditions. In a nritya, the dance-acting expands to include silent expression of words through gestures and body motion set to musical notes. The Kuchipudi actor articulates a story (particularly of Krishna) or a spiritual message. This part of a repertoire is more than sensory enjoyment, it aims to engage the emotions and mind of the viewer.
- The Natyam is a play, typically a team performance, but can be acted out by a solo performer where the dancer uses certain standardized body movements to indicate a new character in the underlying story. A Natya incorporates the elements of a Nritya. Kuchipudi, in its history relied on a team of dance-actors, while in modern times Kuchipudi productions include solo or duo performances.

=== Sequence ===
A complete Kuchipudi show sequence always consists of nritta and nritya in solo or group performance, but when the underlying text is a play, it may include a natya. The nritta or pure abstract dance parts of Kuchipudi, states Reginald Massey, may include parts such as darus, jatis, jatiswarams, tirmanas and tillanas. The nritya or expressive performance in Kuchipudi includes padams, varnams, shabdams and shlokas.

A Kuchipudi performance traditionally is a night performance, when rural families return from their farms and are free of their daily work. It has been performed in or next to a Hindu temple, and the stage lit by the yellow lights of castor oil burning torches. The dance-drama begins with an invocation (melavimpu, puvaranga). This may be an on stage prayer to Ganesha, the Hindu god of good beginnings, or may be an invocation expressing reverence to various Hindu gods, goddesses, earth, or one's guru (teacher).

The conductor of the performance enters and plants an "Indra's banner" staff, then introduces all the actors and the characters they play, who are revealed behind a curtain, and when each actor arrives, colored resin is thrown into the flame of one or more torches for dramatic color effects and audience's attention. Each actor performs a short dance called the Pravesa Daru (Note: This is called Dhruva in the ancient text Natya Shastra, which explains its purpose as 'form an emotional connection between the actor and the audience'.) accompanied by a short musical piece, as the vocalist describes his or her role. The conductor is typically present throughout the performance, on the stage, explains the play, talks and humors the audience.

After the actors have been introduced, the nritta part of the Kuchipudi performance starts. The actors present a pure dance (jatis or jatiswarams), performed rhythmically to a musical raga, and these are called Sollakath or Patakshara. A basic unit of dance in Kuchipudi is called a adugu (or adugulu), and these correspond to the karana in Natya Shastra. Each basic unit combines hand and foot movement into a harmonious sthana (posture) and chari (gait), that visually appeals to the audience wherever he or may be sitting. Each dance unit, according to the ancient text, is best performed to certain recitation of mnemonic syllables and musical beat. A series of karana form a jati, formalized originally as an oral tradition through Sanskrit mnemonics, later written, and these form the foundation of what is performed in nritta sequence of Kuchipudi.

Thereafter comes the nritya, the expressive part called abhinaya, and this is the heart of the play. The actor-dancer uses hand mudras and facial expressions inspired by the sign language in ancient Sanskrit texts, with an exacting footwork, to communicate the underlying story to the audience. A solo play or solo part of the performance is called a Shabdam, and this may be set to a poem, a verse or a prose. A varnam combines dance with mime in order to draw out and express the rasa (emotional taste), and this can be solo or group. Parts set to poetry that are love lyrics or express deeper sentiments are called a padam, and this part constitutes expressing the emotional, the allegorical and the spiritual aspects of the play.

Kavutvams are a feature of the performance that is distinctive to Kuchipudi. These are performed either as nritta or nritya, to different talas, wherein the dancer adds acrobatics to the complexity of presentation. For example, the dancer may perform the footwork, rhythmically to music, while balancing a series of pots on his or her head, and then add burning Diya (lamp) in both hands, as the show goes on. Some artists dip their foot on a wet ink pad, then dance rhythmically on a blank white piece of paper, thus painting it; alternatively, the troupe places coloured rice powder on floor and on top the white piece of paper, then dances the musical composition on it, their weight and steps causing the pigment to stick. At the end of the performance, the artist shows the audience the nature scenery or bird or flower or Ganesha or something that results. A Mayura Kavutvam dance produces a painting of a peacock, a Vinayaka Kavutvam of Ganesha, a Simhanandi Kavutvam yields the painting of a lion, each set to a certain classical composition and beat, for instance.

=== Costumes ===
The traditional Kuchipudi was performed by all males troupe. A dancer in a male role would be in Angavastra, also known as Bagalbandi, wear a dhoti (a single pleated piece of cloth hanging down from the waist). A dancer in a female role would wear a Sari with light makeup.

Modern productions retain the male dress, but are more elaborate and Bharatanatyam-like for the female roles. Women artists wear a brilliantly colourful Sari (or a body fitting dress) with a pleated fan stitched in front to help highlight the exacting footwork. The end of the wrapped Sari is held fast under a light metallic (golden or brass) belt at waist. A Kuchipudi artist braids her hair somewhat differently than a Bharatanatyam artist, to reflect the regional traditions, yet wearing flowers are common. Both have symbolic elements embedded in their hair and face jewelry, such as the Vedic symbolisms for the sun and the moon, the soul and the nature, and she sometimes sets her hairdo in the tribhuvana style which represents the three worlds. Her jewelry may include hair jewelry, ear, nose, armlets, necklaces and often a leather anklet piece with little bells (gajjelu or ghungroo). The forehead has a round red bindi or a symmetric tillaka, while the eyes are typically ringed with black collyrium to ease the viewing of expressions by the audience.

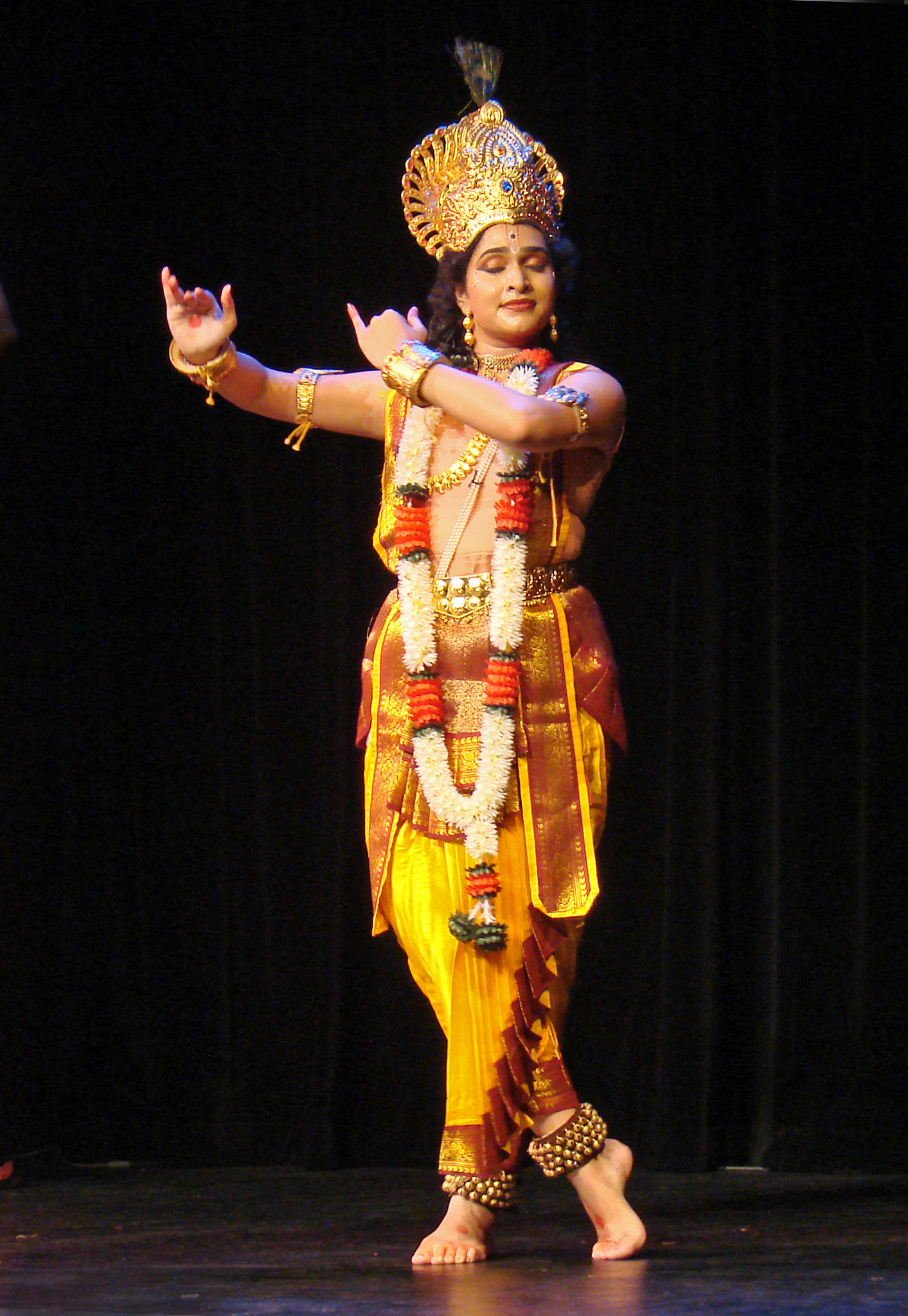
Kuchipudi costumes

Some special Kuchipudi plays may include unusual costumes and theatrics, such as round bottom water pot balanced on the head, dancing with gymnastics or stilt athletics. Other plays may include wing props, a transparent head sheet, or peacock feathered crown to identify the actor playing Krishna.

=== Musical instruments ===
Musical instruments used in Kuchipudi are cymbals, mridangam, violin, thambura, flute. The Kuchipudi performance is led by a conductor (chief musician) called the Sutradhara or Nattuvanar, who typically keeps the beat using cymbals and also recites the musical syllables; the conductor may also sing out the story or spiritual message being enacted, or this may be a role of a separate vocalist or occasionally the dancer-actors themselves. The Kuchipudi orchestra ensemble includes a drummer (mridangam), a clarinetist and a violinist. Depending on the legend being danced out, other musicians such as a flutist may be present.

=== Styles ===
Kuchipudi has several regional banis (styles), which developed because of the uniqueness and creativity of gurus (teachers). This openness and flexibility has been a historic tradition in Indian dance culture, and is traceable to early times in Kuchipudi as the Margi and Desi styles in the text Nrittaratnavali of Jaya Senapati. (Note: Margi and Deshi styles are found in other classical Hindu dances as well, with Margi being those that aim to uplift thoughts, imagination or devotional, focus on spiritual ideas, while Deshi are festive, folksy, focus on celebration and entertainment. According to Kothari and Pasricha, the styles are reflected in the adugulu or the basic building blocks of the dance in Kuchipudi.) According to Senapati, the Desi styles referred to one that incorporated innovations to the conservative Margi styles. Senapati lists examples of each. For Margi styles, he describes Vedayata, Veddangam, Bommalata, Perani, Chindu, Bahurupam, Pagativeshalu and others; while for Desi styles, Senapati describes Rasaka, Charchari, Bhandika, Kollata and others. Some of these styles are discernible in Warangal sculptures of the 13th century.

The dance styles are based on the standard treatises, Abhinaya Darpana and Bharatarnava of Nandikeswara, which is sub-divided into Nattuva Mala and Natya Mala. Nattuva Mala is of two types — the Puja dance performed on the Balipitha in the temple and the Kalika dance performed in a Kalyana Mandapam. Natya Mala is of three kinds — ritual dance for gods, Kalika dance for intellectuals and Bhagavatam for common place.

== Major Kuchipudi dramas ==
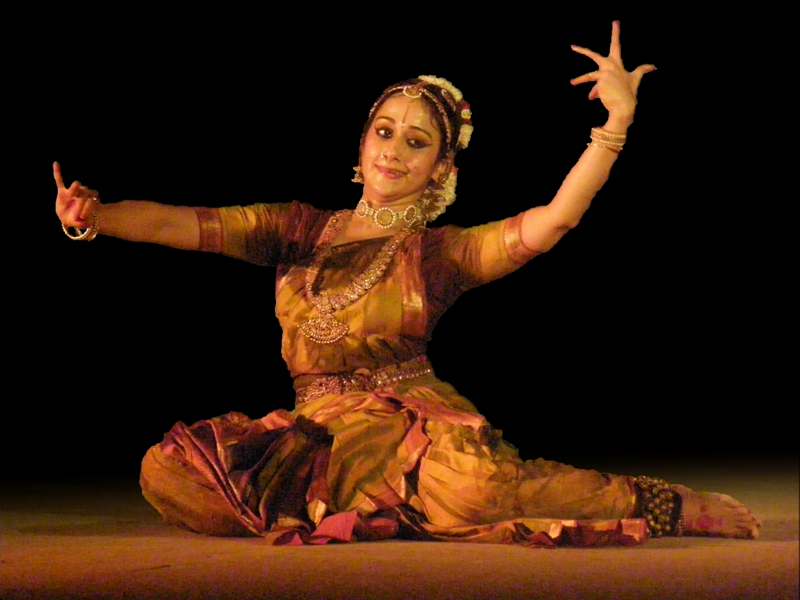
A Kuchipudi dancer performing at IIM Bangalore

The most popular dance-drama is Bhama Kalapam of Sidhyendra Yogi. Narayana Teertha composed the Krishna Lila Tarangini, a story of Krishna's life beginning from his birth to his marriage to Rukmini. Ramaiah Sastri, inspired by the Bhama Kalapam, wrote the Golla Kalapam, which portrays the theme of an ethical satirical conversation between a Gopi and a Brahmin. Other commonly performed plays are the dance-songs (kritis) of Thyagaraja, and the 700 surviving padams out of 4500 composed by Kshetrayya of Movva.

Traditional compositions that have been internationally performed by Kuchipudi artists, particularly among Telugu diaspora communities, include Srinivasa Kalyanam, Rukmini Kalyanam (marriage of Krishna and Rukmini), Sakuntalam Bhamakalpam, Hara Vilasam, Prahlada Charitram (Holi festival-related story), Usha Parinayam, Sasirekha Parinayam, Rama Natakam (probably the oldest play), Mohini Rukmangada, Chamundeswari Sabda, Ardhanareeswaram Sabda and Perini Thandavam.

== Schools and training centers ==
Kuchipudi training, as with all major classical Indian arts, have traditionally begun at a young age. The training includes physical exercises, theory, demonstration lessons and a lot of practice. The physical exercises range from yoga to special exercises to develop a supple body and flexibility in leg muscles, lower body, core, arms, shoulders and neck. Some examples of special exercises, state Kothari and Pasricha, are Dandemu, Chakradandemu, Ekapada, Gunjeelu, Kailsamu, Kappilu and Moggalu. They are educated in Sanskrit and Telugu. They must also learn music, literature and become vocalists. Training has expanded from within traditional families to anyone across the world due to its popularization.

Lakshminarayana Sastry is credited with introducing females to Kuchipudi, which was taught initially to male dancers, and with developing solo-dancing.

== See also ==
- Andhra Natyam
- Perini Sivatandavam
- Vilasini Natyam
