= List of people from Andhra Pradesh =

This is a list of notable people from Andhra Pradesh, India, throughout history.

== Independence advocates ==
- Alluri Sitarama Raju – revolutionary, led the Rampa Rebellion of 1922-1924
- Uyyalawada Narasimha Reddy – early opponent of British rule
- Vedre Ramachandra Reddy Bhoodhan – social reformer, Satyagraha Movement leader
- Gottipati Brahmaiah
- Chowdary Satyanarayana – human rights activist, Legislator
- Puchalapalli Sundaraiah – founding member of Communist Party in India
- Kalluri Chandramouli
- Vavilala Gopalakrishnaya
- Kaneganti Hanumanthu
- Veerapandiya Kattabomman – Palaiyakkarar, early opponent of British rule
- Chandra Pulla Reddy – communist leader
- Gouthu Latchanna
- Makineni Basavapunnaiah – communist leader
- Sarojini Naidu – poet
- Tanguturi Prakasam – known as "Andhra Kesari"
- Muktyala Raja – Member of Legislative Assembly, infrastructure creation in India
- N. G. Ranga
- Kasinadhuni Nageswara Rao – politician
- Koratala Satyanarayana – communist politician
- Potti Sreeramulu – revolutionary, fasted to death in protest for separate Andhra Pradesh
- Swami Ramanand Tirtha – educator and social activist
- Pingali Venkayya – designed the Indian national flag
- Kommareddi Suryanarayana
- Kotagiri Venkata Krishna Rao – poet
- Digavalli Venkata Siva Rao – lawyer, historian and writer

== Reserve Bank of India Governors ==
- Y. Venugopal Reddy – Governor of Reserve Bank of India, 2003–2008
- Duvvuri Subbarao – Governor of Reserve Bank of India, 2008–2012

== Chief Ministers ==
- Neelam Sanjiva Reddy – later the President of India
- Tanguturi Prakasam
- Burgula Ramakrishna Rao
- Bezawada Gopala Reddy
- Bhavanam Venkataram Reddy
- Kasu Brahmananda Reddy
- Damodaram Sanjivayya
- Kotla Vijaya Bhaskara Reddy
- Nandamuri Taraka Rama Rao
- Nadendla Bhaskara Rao
- Nedurumalli Janardhana Reddy
- Nara Chandrababu Naidu
- Y. S. Rajasekhara Reddy
- Konijeti Rosaiah
- Nallari Kiran Kumar Reddy
- Y. S. Jaganmohan Reddy

== Military Chiefs ==
- Air Chief Marshal Denis La Fontaine – Chief of Staff, Indian Air Force, 1985–88
- Air Chief Marshal Idris Hasan Latif – Chief of Staff, Indian Air Force, 1978–81
- Air Chief Marshal Fali Homi Major – Chief of Staff, Indian Air Force, 2007–09
- General K. V. Krishna Rao, Chief of the Army Staff (India), 1981–83

== Government officials ==
- Mohd Amanullah Khan - politician
- G. Raghava Reddy – IPS, known for innovative farming

== Education ==
- Sarvepalli Radhakrishnan – vice-chancellor of Andhra University
- Arjula Ramachandra Reddy – biologist, first vice-chancellor of Yogi Vemana University
- Cattamanchi Ramalinga Reddy – founder and vice-chancellor of Andhra University; Vice-chancellor of Mysore University
- G. Ram Reddy – former University Grants Commission chairman
- Vasireddy Sri Krishna – former vice-chancellor of Andhra University
- Lakshmi Chilukuri,Provost Of Sixth College And Mother Of Second Lady Usha Vance.

== Business and industry ==
- Kallam Anji Reddy – founder of Dr. Reddy's Laboratories
- Prathap C. Reddy – founder of Apollo Hospitals, India
- G. Pulla Reddy – businessman, philanthropist, educationist
- Gunupati Venkata Krishna Reddy – founder of GVK
- P Obul Reddy – founder of Nippo batteries
- Prem Reddy – founder of Prime Healthcare Services, which owns several hospitals in the United States
- Ramesh Gelli – founder and chairperson of the erstwhile and now defunct Global Trust Bank
- Mullapudi Harishchandra Prasad – founder of Andhra Sugars
- Byrraju Ramalinga Raju – founder of Satyam Computers
- T. Subbarami Reddy – founder of Gayatri group; philanthropist
- S. P. Y. Reddy – Chairman of Nandi Pipes, Panyam Cements and S.P.Y. Agro Industries
- Nimmagadda Prasad – founder of Chairman of Matrix Laboratories
- Lagadapati Rajagopal – founder and Chairman of Lanco Group
- Grandhi Mallikarjuna Rao – chairman, GMR Group; first Telugu person on Forbes magazine's billionaires list
- Ramoji Rao – Head of Eenadu Group, Ramoji Film city
- Rayapati Sambasiva Rao – Jayalaxmi Group of companies
- Galla Ramachandra Naidu – founder of Amar Raja Group

== Science ==
- Raj Reddy – scientist in artificial intelligence
- U. Aswathanarayana – Honorary Director of the Mahadevan International Centre for Water Resources Management, Hyderabad
- N N Murthy – quality and environment expert
- Yelavarthy Nayudamma – chemical engineer
- Mokshagundam Visvesvarayya – engineer
- Yellapragada Subbarow – cancer researcher
- A. S. Rao – scientist, founder of the Electronics Corporation of India Limited
- C.R.Rao – statistician and professor emeritus at Penn State University
- K.L. Rao – civil engineer, irrigation expert and political leader
- Prof. Kotcherlakota Rangadhama Rao – physicist (spectroscopy)
- Praveen Kumar Gorakavi - Chemical Engineer
- Kumar Biradha - researcher in the field of crystal engineering
- Aparajita Datta (born 1970), conservation scientist with the Nature Conservation Foundation

== Artists ==
- Krishna Reddy – printmaker and sculptor
- Vempati Chinna Satyam – exponent of Kuchipudi dance
- Eelapata Raghuramaiah – stage and cinema actor in Andhra Pradesh
- Raja and Radha Reddy – Kuchipudi
- Shobha Naidu – Kuchipudi
- Yamini Reddy – Kuchipudi

== Musicians and dancers ==
- Mangalampalli Balamuralikrishna – Carnatic singer and musician
- Nataraja Ramakrishna – dance guru; revived ancient Andhra Natyam and Perini styles of dance; Chairman of Andhra Pradesh Sangeeta Nataka Academy
- Ghantasala – playback singer of old classical Indian movies, predominantly Telugu
- Emani Sankara Sastry – Veena player of Carnatic music
- Vempati Chinna Satyam – dance guru of the Kuchipudi dance form
- S. P. Balasubrahmanyam – male singer
- Raja and Radha Reddy – Kuchipudi dancers
- Shobha Naidu – Kuchipudi dancer
- S. Janaki – female playback singer
- M. M. Keeravani – music director
- Yamini Krishnamurthy – Kuchipudi and Bharathanatyam dancer
- Dwaram Venkataswamy Naidu – violinist
- P. B. Sreenivas – playback singer
- P. Susheela – playback singer

== Literature ==
- Gona Budda Reddy – 13th-century poet
- Vemana – Telugu poet
- Nannaya – first Telugu writer (Adi kavi), Mahabharatam in Telugu started by him, out of 18 parvas 3.5 parvas written by him
- Potana – Mahabhagavatam, Bhogini Dandakam
- Tikkana – Mahabharatam last 14 parvas written by him
- Gurazada Apparao – Telugu poet
- Gudipati Venkata Chalam – novelist
- Gurram Jashuva – Telugu poet, author, Telugu and Sanskrit scholar
- Tirupati Venkata Kavulu – two Telugu poets
- Devulapalli Krishnasastri – Telugu poet
- Tummala Seetharama Murthy – Telugu poet
- Chilakamarthi Lakshmi Narasimham – writer
- Jatavallabhula Purushottam - poet
- Kethu Viswanatha Reddy – poet from Rayalaseema
- D.V.Narasa Raju – Telugu writer, novelist
- Kavisekhara Dr Umar Alisha – Telugu poet
- Tripuraneni Ramaswamy – playwright
- Garikapati Narasimha Rao – Avadhani
- Keshava Reddy – Telugu novelist
- M. S. Reddy – writer
- Madhunapantula Satyanarayana Sastry – Telugu poet
- Viswanatha Satyanarayana – Telugu poet
- Vasireddy Seethadevi – Novelist
- Paravastu Chinnayya Soori – Telugu scholar
- Tripuraneni Gopichand – author
- Srirangam Srinivasarao – Telugu poet
- Ushasri – Writer
- Sirivennela Seetharama Sastry – Telugu poet
- Tanikella Bharani - Filmwriter, Actor, Poet
- Janardhana Maharshi - (author, poet, film writer)
- Dantu Muralikrishna - Writer, Singer & Scientist

== Philosophers ==
- Jiddu Krishnamurti – philosopher
- Sri Potuluri Virabrahmendra Swami – mystic

== Award winners ==
=== Bharat Ratna ===
- Varahagiri Venkata Giri – former President of India

=== Padma Vibhushan ===
- Cingireddy Narayana Reddy
- Akkineni Nageswara Rao
- Ravi Narayana Reddy
- Prathap C. Reddy
- Y. Venugopal Reddy
- Sarvepalli Gopal
- Kotha Satchidanda Murthy
- Padmaja Naidu
- M. Narasimham
- N. G. Ranga
- Sri Prakasa
- C. R. Rao
- Palle Rama Rao
- Kaloji Narayana Rao
- V. Kasturi Ranga Varadarja Rao – Telugu origin, born in Tamil Nadu
- Manepalli Narayana Rao Venkatachaliah
- P. Venugopal
- Mehdi Nawaz Jung
- Ali Yavar Jung
- Hafiz Mohamad Ibrahim
- C. D. Deshmukh
- Ramoji Rao

=== Padma Bhushan ===
- B.N. Reddy
- Jaggayya
- Vempati Chinna Satyam
- Raj Reddy
- Akkineni Nageshwara Rao
- Konidela Chiranjeevi
- Perugu Siva Reddy
- Daggubati Ramanaidu
- P. Susheela
- G.V.K. Reddy
- Raja and Radha Reddy
- Krishna Ghattamaneni
- K. Srinath Reddy
- Satya N. Atluri
- C.K. Nayudu
- A. S. Rao

=== Padma Shree ===
- V. Nagayya
- Cingireddy Narayana Reddy
- Eelapata Raghuramaiah
- Akkineni Nageswara Rao
- Ghantasala Venkateswar Rao
- D. Nageshwar Reddy
- K.C. Reddy
- Kallam Anji Reddy
- Perugu Siva Reddy
- S. P. Balasubrahmanyam
- Dwaram Venkataswamy Naidu
- Shobha Naidu
- Sayyid Ahmedullah Qadri
- D. V. S. Raju
- Brahmanandam
- V.V.S.Laxman
- Shobha Raju
- Nataraja Ramakrishna
- Allu Ramalingaiah
- Nandamuri Taraka Rama Rao
- Raja and Radha Reddy
- Nerella Venumadhav
- K. Viswanath
- Srikanth Kidambi

=== Rajiv Gandhi Khel Ratna ===
- Pullela Gopichand – badminton (2000–2001)
- Karnam Malleswari – weightlifting (1995–1996)
- Saina Nehwal – badminton (2009–10)

=== Arjuna Award ===
- Koneru Humpy – chess
- Sharath Kamal – table tennis
- Yousuf Khan – football
- Mukesh Kumar – hockey
- Karnam Malleswari – weightlifting
- A. Ramana Rao – volleyball
- J. J. Shobha – track and field

=== Dronacharya Award ===
- Pullela Gopichand – badminton, 2009

=== Member of the Order of the British Empire ===
- Sekhar Tam Tam – for service as District Medical Officer in the British Caribbean island of Grenada

== Judges, advocates and lawyers ==
- K. Jayachandra Reddy
- L. Narasimha Reddy
- Subodh Markandeya
- Konda Madhava Reddy
- K. Punnaiah

== Sports ==
Cricket

- Buchi Babu Naidu
- C.K. Nayudu
- M.S.K. Prasad
- Bharath Reddy
- Nitish Kumar Reddy
- Venkatapathy Raju
- Yalaka Venugopal Rao
- Cota Ramaswami
- Ambati Rayudu

Archery

- Jyothi Surekha Vennam

Athletics

- Kodi Rammurthy Naidu
- Neelapu Rami Reddy – former sprinter and athletics champion
- Jyothi Yerraji – hurdler

Chess

- Dronavalli Harika
- Pendyala Harikrishna
- Koneru Humpy

Weightlifting

- Karnam Malleswari – Olympic bronze medallist

Hockey

- Mukesh Kumar

Badminton

- Chetan Anand
- Pullela Gopichand

Other sports

- Achanta Sharath Kamal – table tennis
- A. Ramana Rao – volleyball

== Music ==
Traditional

- Kshetrayya
- Tallapaka Annamacharya
- Bhadradri Ramadasu
- Tyagaraja – of the trinity of Carnatic music

Classical

- Mangalampalli Balamuralikrishna
- Nedunuri Krishnamurthy
- Dwaram Venkataswamy Naidu
- Sripada Pinakapani
- Emani Sankara Sastry
- Nookala Chinna Satyanarayana
- U.Srinivas

Film score

- S. Rajeswara Rao – composer
- Ghantasala – singer, composer
- S P Balasubrahmanyam – singer
- K. Chakravarthy – composer
- Jikki – singer
- S. Janaki – singer
- Koti – composer
- Nagur Babu (Mano) – singer
- Veturi – lyricist
- M. M. Keeravani – composer, lyricist, singer
- Ramana Gogula – composer
- Ramesh Naidu – composer
- Devi Sri Prasad – composer, singer
- S V Krishna Reddy – composer
- Satyam – composer
- Mani Sharma – composer
- Sirivennela Sitaramasastri – lyricist
- P. B. Sreenivas – singer
- Sunitha – singer
- Usha – singer
- P. Susheela – singer
- Master Venu – composer

== Dance ==
- Vempati Chinna Satyam
- Sidhendra Yogi – originator of the Kuchipudi dance style
- Raja and Radha Reddy – Kuchipudi, Padma Bhushan awardees
- Shobha Naidu – Kuchipudi, Padma Sri awardee
- Jayapa Nayudu

== Cinema ==
Directors

- Raghupathi Venkaiah
- H. M. Reddy
- B. N. Reddy
- B. Nagi Reddy
- C. S. R. Anjaneyulu
- Bapu
- K Vishwanath
- Shyam Benegal
- L. V. Prasad
- Dasari Narayana Rao
- A. Kodandarami Reddy
- K. Raghavendra Rao
- S. V. Krishna Reddy
- V. N. Reddy
- Jandhyala
- E V V Satyanarayana
- S. S. Rajamouli
- Kodi Ramakrishna
- Trivikram Srinivas
- Puri Jagannadh
- Sukumar
- Sekhar Kammula
- Deva Katta
- Radhakrishna Jagarlamudi (Krish)
- N.Shankar
- Srinu Vaitla
- Krishna Vamsi
- Ram Gopal Varma
- V. V. Vinayak
- Surender Reddy

Producers

- Raghupathi Venkaiah Naidu
- B. N. Reddy
- B. Nagi Reddy
- L V Prasad
- Allu Aravind
- Vikram Krishna
- Murali Mohan
- M S Raju
- D. Ramanaidu
- M. S. Reddy
- Shyam Prasad Reddy
- Dil Raju
- Gopichand Lagadapati

Writers

- Acharya Aatreya
- Gopimohan
- Paruchuri Brothers
- Mullapudi Venkata Ramana
- Pingali Nagendra Rao
- Abburi Ravi
- B.V.S.Ravi
- Ajay Sastry
- Guna Sekhar
- Trivikram Srinivas
- Sukumar
- Tanikella bharani
- Janardhana Maharshi
- Kona Venkat
- Chandra Sekhar Yeleti

Actresses

- Savitri
- Sarada
- Bhanupriya
- Anjali Devi
- Devika
- Jamuna
- Sowcar Janaki
- Jaya Prada
- Jayasudha
- P. Kannamba
- Kavitha
- Krishnaveni
- Laya
- Bindu Madhavi
- Bhanumathi Ramakrishna
- Sameera Reddy
- Santhakumari
- Suryakantham
- Vanisri
- G. Varalakshmi
- S. Varalakshmi

Actors

- N. T. Rama Rao
- Akkineni Nageswara Rao
- S. V. Ranga Rao
- Sobhan Babu
- Ramana Reddy
- Relangi
- V. Nagayya
- Ghattamaneni Krishna
- Dasari Narayana Rao
- Gummadi
- Chiranjeevi
- Venkatesh
- Pawan Kalyan
- Mahesh Babu
- Jr. NTR
- Prabhas
- Ram Charan Teja
- Allu Arjun
- Ravi Teja
- Nithiin
- Nani
- Sai Dharam Tej
- Gopichand
- Jaggayya
- Kaikala Satyanarayana
- Nagarjuna
- Prabhakar
- Rajanala
- Krishnam Raju
- Vishal Krishna
- Mohan Babu
- Tarun Kumar
- Gopichand Lagadapati
- Allu Rama Lingaiah
- Murali Mohan
- Ranganath
- Gadde Rajendra Prasad
- J. V. Somayajulu
- Balakrishna
- Jagapathi Babu
- Raja Babu
- Srihari
- Ravi Teja
- Naga Chaitanya
- Venu

Music directors

- K. Chakravarthy
- Chakri
- S P Balasubramanyam
- Ghantasala
- Ramana Gogula
- M.M. Keeravani
- K M Radha Krishnan
- Ramesh Naidu
- Devi Sri Prasad
- Koti
- Saluri Rajeshwara Rao
- Satyam
- Mani Sharma
- Vandemataram Srinivas
- Vamsi
- Master Venu
- Vidyasagar

Journalists

- Manikonda Chalapathi Rau
- Pasam Jagannadham Naidu

== Religion ==
Sanatana Dharma / Hinduism

- Tirumala Tirupati Devasthanams (TTD)

Buddhism

- Acharya Nagarjuna

Secular

- Sathya Sai Baba

== Others ==
- Vijaya Lakshmi Emani (1958–2009) – social activist
- Aruna Miller – Maryland State Representative
- Laxman Reddy – bodybuilder, Mr. World 2010

== See also ==
- Lists of Indians by state
- Telugu people
- List of Telugu people
