= Dwaram =

Dwaram or Dvaram (Telugu: ద్వారం) is a Telugu surname. It means doorway in the Telugu language. Notable people with surname include:

- Dwaram Venkataswamy Naidu was one of the most important carnatic violinists of the 20th century.
- Dwaram Bhavanarayana Rao, an eminent musician and writer.
- Dwaram Lakshmi, an Indian singer
