= Dwaram Durga Prasad Rao =

Indian violinist and music teacher

- Occupation: Violinist
- Awards: Sangeet Natak Akademi Award (2014)

Dwaram Durga Prasad Rao (alternatively spelled Dwaram Durga Prasada Rao) is an Indian violinist of Carnatic music style, guru and music teacher from the state of Andhra Pradesh. For over fifty years, he has performed solo and as an accompanist in several music concerts. He received the Sangeet Natak Akademi Award, India's highest award in the arts, for his contributions to Carnatic music.

== Early life ==
Rao is from Vizianagaram. He has a brother, Dwaram Satyanarayana Rao, who is also a violinist.

== Career ==
Rao is an exponent of violin in Carnatic music style for at least 70 years as of 2016. He studied with Ivaturi Vijayeswara Rao. When he was 17 years old, Rao won a Carnatic music competition held by All India Radio. He accompanied his brother in several performances and also performed solo. He is a guru and teaches music. His violin playing was generally received favourably among critics and connoisseurs alike.

He worked as a lecturer for 22 years and later as the principal of Maharajah's Government College of Music and Dance in Vizianagaram for 18 years. For a brief time period, he had an apprenticeship with painter Antyakula Pydiraju.

== Awards ==
Rao was conferred with the Sangeet Natak Akademi Award, India's highest civilian award in the field of arts, for the year 2014 in the Carnatic instrumental music category by the Sangeet Natak Akademi, overseen by the Government of India.

== Family ==
Durga Prasad Rao hails from a family of violinists. His grandfather Dwaram Venkataswamy Naidu was one of the most important Carnatic music violinists of the 20th century. Other renowned violinists include Naidu's brothers Dwaram Narasinga Rao Naidu and Dwaram Venkata Krishnaiah, daughter Dwaram Mangatayaru, son Dwaram Bhavanarayana Rao; Bhavanarayana Rao's daughter Dwaram Lakshmi; and Durga Prasad Rao's brother Dwaram Satyanarayana Rao.
