= Balantrapu Rajanikanta Rao =

Indian writer, composer and poet (1920–2018)

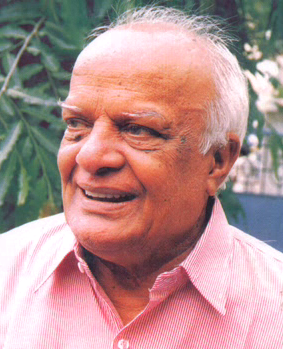
- Born: 29 January 1920; Nidadavole, Andhra Pradesh, British Raj
- Died: 22 April 2018 (aged 98); Vijayawada, Andhra Pradesh, India
- Citizenship: India
- Education: B.A.(Hons.)
- Alma mater: Andhra University
- Spouse: Subhadradevi
- Children: Rama Kumari Hemachandra; Nirupama Kumari; Sarath Chandra Rama Chandra Venkob
- Relatives: Balantrapu Venkatarao (Father); Balantrapu Venkataramanamma (Mother)
- Writing career
- Genres: Writer, composer, musicologist
- Notable work: Andhra Vaggeyakara Charitam
- Notable awards: Sahitya Akademi Award (1961); Kalaprapoorna

Balantrapu Rajanikanta Rao (Telugu: బాలాంత్రపు రజనీకాంత రావు; 29 January 1920 – 22 April 2018) was an Indian writer, composer and poet in the Telugu language. He was the son of Balantrapu Venkatarao, one half of the modern Telugu poet-duo "Kavi Rajahamsa" Venkata Parvateswara Kavulu. He won several national and state level awards for his work. He died in April 2018 at the age of 98.

== Early life ==
Rajanikanta Rao started his schooling in Pithapuram, East Godavari District, Andhra Pradesh. He went on to complete his high school education at P.R. College, Kakinada. He later completed his B.A. (Hons) from Andhra University in the year 1940, with Telugu and Sanskrit as main subjects. Dr. C. R. Reddy, former VC of Andhra University sang along with Rajanikanta Rao during college days.

== Career ==
=== Broadcaster ===
Rajanikanta Rao began his career as a programme executive in AIR-Madras in the year 1941. He was responsible for writing and composing the first Telugu song ever broadcast in independent India on the midnight of 15 August 1947, following the speech of Jawaharlal Nehru; "Our tryst with destiny". The song "Mroyimpu jayabheri" was sung by T. Suryakumari. In 1948 to celebrate the first anniversary of Independence the song "Madi swatantra desam " was written and composed. This was also sung by Tangaturi Suryakumari. As the programme executive in AIR-Vijayawada he was the originator of 'Bhakti Ranjani'; a devotional programme.

Rajanikanta Rao became the station director of AIR-Ahmadabad, AIR-Vijayawada and retired as the station director of AIR-Bangalore (1976–78) – completing 36 years in the broadcasting field. He initiated and designed an interactive radio programme, called "Dharmasandehalu" hosted by Mr.Ushasri. He was the first director to broadcast an Annamacharya kirtana everyday before 7.00 clock news bulletin. He was made the Producer Emeritus of Akashavani in 1982.

=== Artist ===
Since the age of twenty one he has written lyrics, composed songs and directed ballets. Under the pseudonyms Nalini and Taranath he has composed many tunes for popular movies like Swargaseema, Gruhapravesam, etc. Kuchipudi ballets and Yakshaganas such as 'Sri Krishna Saranam Mama', 'Menaka Viswamitra', Vipranarayana', 'Chandidas' and 'Subhadraajuniyam' have won him accolades. His literary works include 'Satapatra Sundari'- a collection of lyrics, 'Andhra Vaggeyakara Charitam'- his magnum opus (described below) and 'Jejimamayya Patalu'- a collection of songs for children and 'Etiki edureeta'.

He composed and conducted music for Vadyabrinda (a national orchestra), AIR-Delhi and Vadyabrinda, AIR-Madras. His popular compositions included Andhri – an origin of the Raga Kalyani, Raga Desavarali, Raga Devasalagam, Viswayanam-the voyage of the universe and 'Sangeeta Gangotri' – a musical composition on the evolution of Indian music to name a few.

=== Musicologist ===
'Andhra Vaggeyakara Charitam' is regarded as his magnum opus. It consists of biographies of lyricists and music composers along with a history and evolution of Andhra music, which won in 1961 the Central Sahitya Akademi Award. In the year 1980, Mr. Rajanikanta Rao was awarded an Honorary Doctorate by his alma mater Andhra University. From 1988 to 1990, he worked as a visiting professor of the Telugu University, Rajahmundry. He then joined the Tirumala Tirupati Devasthanams (TTD) as a special officer of the Sri Venkateswara Kalapeetham and worked there for 4 years. He has been presenting research papers on musicology in various conferences of Music Academy, Madras on subjects that include Kshetrayya's lyrics, Geeta Govinda, Ragas of Gandhara Grama, ancient scales of Indian music, etc. He shared his memoirs of rich socio-cultural experiences over a lifetime through 'Rajani Bhavatarangalu', a weekly column published in the Telugu newspaper Andhra Prabha.

== Interview with Chalam ==
In 1972, Rajanikanta Rao had taken an interview of the popular Telugu writer with the name Gudipati Venkatachalam as the Director of AIR-Vijayawada. This interview remains the only radio-broadcast interview of the famous writer till this day.

== Operas ==
Rajanikanta Rao made a name for himself with operas which have been choreographed by dancers like Vempati Chinna Satyam and Shobha Naidu some of which are as follows:

1. Chandidas

2. Divya Jyoti (on Buddha)

3. Viswaveena (on Orpheus)

4. Megha Sandesham

5. Menaka Viswamitra

6. Kalyana Srinivasam

7. Sri Krishna Saranam Mama

8. Namostute Nari

== Published works ==
1. Andhra Vaggeyakara Charitam

2. Viswaveena (A book of operas in Telugu)

3. Satapatra Sundari (Songs of all hews) which won Telugu Bhasha Samiti Award.

4. Alone with the spouse divine (Ekantaseva) published by the TTD.

5. Kshetrayya (a biography of the saint composer with translation of his lyrics) published by the national Sahitya Akademi.

6. Ramadasu (A biography of the saint composer published by the national Sahitya Akademi)

7. Jejimamayya Patalu (Songs for children published by EMESCO)

8. Muvva Gopala Padavali (A biography of the saint composer with translation of his lyrics)

9. Tyagaraju (A biography of the saint composer Tyagaraja published by the National Book Trust)

10. Etiki Edurita (A collection of modern Telugu poetry by Rajani)

11. Chaturbhani (A collection of four Sanskrit plays written in 4th century BC translated into Telugu)

12. A collection of Annamacharya lyrics translated into English and published by Dravidian University, Kuppam

== Telugu Cinema and Dance Dramas ==
1. Bhale Pelli and Tarumaru

- Menaka Viswamitra – dance drama (script and music)
- Jo Achyutananda – sung by Subhadra Devi

2. Swargaseema (1945) (songs and music) directed by B. N. Reddy (the popular song 'Oho pavurama' and 'Oho tapodhana sundara')

3. Perantalu (music) directed by T. Gopichand

4. Lakshmamma Katha

5. Gruhapraveesam – produced by Sarathi Pictures and directed by T. Gopichand

6. Manavathi (1952) – directed by Y. V. Rao

7. Rajamakutam (1959) and Bangaru Papa (1954) directed by B. N. Reddy

== Awards ==
The numerous titles such as Naada Sudharnava, Pumbhaava Saraswati, Naveena Vaggeyakara conferred on him are reflections of his versatility. He is one among the few who received both Sangeet natak academy and Sahitya academy awards.

1. Visishta Puraskaram from newly formed Andhra Pradesh State Government.

2. Tagore Akademi Ratna – A one time honour by the Sangeet Natak Akademi to mark Rabindranath Tagore's 150th Anniversary in 2011.

3. Kalaprapoorna – An honorary doctorate conferred on him by his alma mater Andhra University in 1981.

4. Kala Ratna Award – conferred on him by the Andhra Pradesh government in 2007.

5. Central Sahitya Akademi Award in 1961

6. The Pratibha Moorti Lifetime Achievement award for 2000 was bestowed on him by US based Appajyotsula Vishnubhotla Foundation.

7. ' Visistha Puraskaram' a lifetime achievement award was bestowed by the newly formed Andhra Pradesh Government in its first Ugadi celebrations in the newly formed state.

8. Rotary Club of Vijayawada conferred its Lifetime Achievement Award.
