= Balantrapu =

Balantrapu (Telugu: బాలాంత్రపు) may refer to:

- Balantrapu Rajanikanta Rao (1920–2018), writer, composer and poet in the Telugu language
- Balantrapu Venkata Rao, one of the two Telugu poets in the duo Venkata Parvatiswara Kavulu
