= Adibhatla Narayana Dasu =

Indian poet and musician (1864–1945)

అజ్జాడ ఆదిభట్ల నారాయణదాసు Ajjada Adibhatla Narayana Dasu
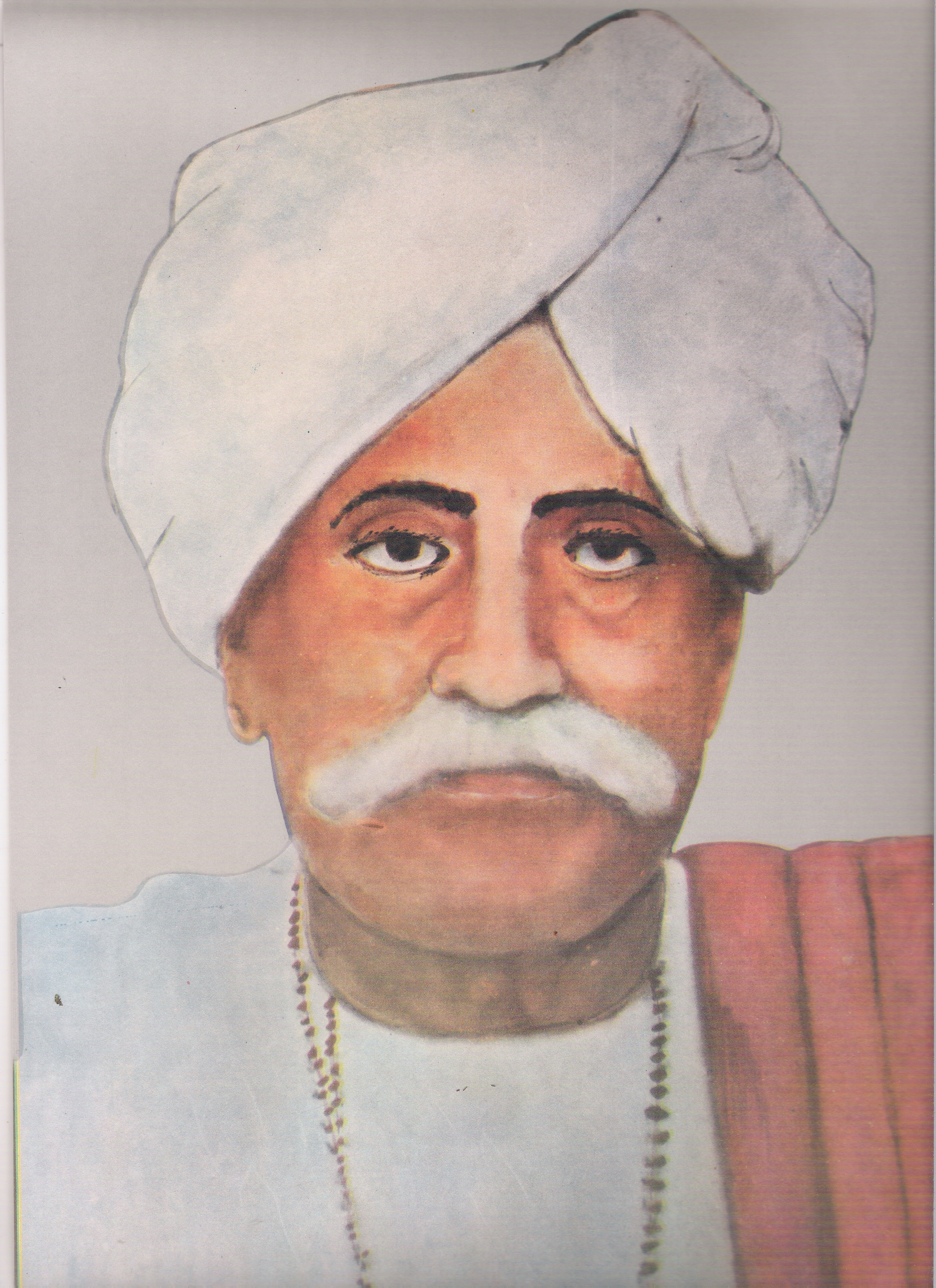
- Pandit Ajjada Adibhatla Narayana Dasu
- Born: 31 August 1864; Ajjada, Vizianagaram district, Madras Presidency, British India
- Died: 2 January 1945 (aged 80)
- Occupations: Playwright, poet, musician
- Writing career
- Genres: Books, Poetry, Philosophy, Music Composition, Music performance, singing Ballet Rendition.
- Notable works: Art form Harikatha, Jagadjyothi,
- Notable awards: Harikatha Pitamaha, PanchamukhI Parameshwara, Laya Brahma, Sangita Sahitya Savrabhauma

Ajjada Adibhatla Narayana Dasu (31 August 1864 – 2 January 1945) was an artist in Madras Presidency, British India. He was born in Ajjada village, near Bobbili, presently in Balijipeta mandal of Vizianagaram district, Andhra Pradesh, India.

Pandit Ajjada Adibhatla Narayana Das was a poet, musician, dancer, linguist, and philosopher. He performed Swadhyaya (self-taught) like Tapas (penance) and vice versa. His descendants live in India, USA and Australia.

== Polyglot Facet ==
Narayana Das was born in a Brahmin family. Narayana Das was a linguist with proficiency in eight languages, poet, philosopher, playwright, composer, dancer, actor and the creator of the unique art form, Hari Katha. He knew several Indian and classical languages like Telugu, Sanskrit, Tamil, Hindi, Bengali, Urdu, English, Arabic and Persian.

== Literary Metered Poetry Facet ==
Narayana Das was a scholar who had mastery over four classical languages (Sanskrit, Telugu, Arabic and Persian) and who translated from Persian and English into Sanskrit and Telugu; the only litterateur who wrote a comparative treatise on the works of Kalidas and Shakespeare;

He was also a performer of Ashtavadhanam. His works ranged from children's literature to philosophical treatises.

He wrote over fifty books in Telugu, Sanskrit and Atcha-Telugu (Desyandhramu or Telugu unmixed of Sanskrit). His works included original story-poems (Kavyas and Prabndhas), Harikathas, prose works, musical works, dramas, translations, treatises in philosophy and Vedic studies and children's literature.

He felt that Edward Fitzgerald's English translations did not do justice to the Persian poet Omar Khayyam's poetry. To demonstrate his viewpoint he translated both the original quatrains of Omar Khayyam and Edward Fitzgerald's English translation into two languages – Sanskrit and Atcha Telugu in different meters. The work titled The Rubaiyaat of Omar Khayyam (1932) was acclaimed as a rare literary feat by the literati of his times. In a rare tribute, a leading newspaper reviewed the book an editorial hailed it as A Monument of Scholarship.

He compared the works of the Sanskrit dramatist Kālidāsa with those of Shakespeare. Entitled Nava Rasa Tarangini (1922) the book annotates passages consisting of the nine rasas or moods from the dramas of both the dramatists by translating them into Telugu.

His Sanskrit works include Harikathamrutam a compilation of three Hari Kathas, Taarakam an original allegorical poem and two Shatakas Ramachandra Shatakam and Kashi Shatakam. A Satakam usually consists of 100 verses written in the same prosody.

He translated Lalithasahasranama in 'Natu' Telugu or pure Telugu language.

== Music Composing & Performing Facet ==
Maestros of the musical world honoured him with titles like Laya Brahma and Panchamukhi Parameshwara for his ability to sing to five different Talas, beat with two arms, two feet and the head. Five different musicians used to keep time with him when he performed Panchamukhi feat.

The literary and musical elite of his time joined to honour him with the title Sangita Sahitya Sarvabhauma.

He was the first principal of the Maharajah's Government College of Music and Dance (Vijayarama Gana Pathasala) established by the Maharajah of Vizianagaram in 1919. The Maharajah in fact established the Music College, which was among the first few in South India, to honour the Pundit and enable enthusiasts to learn music from him. Dwaram Venkataswami Naidu was a lecturer in the college during the Pandit's tenure and succeeded him as principal.

He entranced Rabindranath Tagore with his rendering of Hindusthani Bhairavi. Tagore sought the curriculum of the Vizianagaram Music College to be introduced in Shantiniketan.

He composed a lyric, titled Dasha Vidha Raga Navati Kusuma Manjari incorportating 90 ragas in the Manjari metre. He set to musical notation 300-odd select ruks from the Rigveda in a work titled Ruksangraham and taught playing them on the veena to students but also translated them as poems in Telugu, demonstrating his command in Vedaardham (meaning of Vedas).

== Dance, Singing and Acting Fused Story Telling Facet ==
Narayana created a new art form which he called the Harikatha. Harikatha had poetry and music as the medium. Dance and histrionics formed the visual expression.

An exponent of Harikatha should be able to compose and recite extempore the objective of the performance being to entertain and educate (edutain) both the layman and the erudite scholar. Having invented this vehicle called Harikatha, he wrote twenty one Harikathas, seventeen in Telugu, and three in Sanskrit.

== Self-Actualization Dimension ==
Narayana Das is a compulsive urge to excel in everything he did. The conception and renunciation of Naa Eruka, his autobiography is an example that provides insight into his complex personality. He began writing what would have been the first autobiography in Telugu and sent the initial chapters, narrating his life story from birth to the age of about thirty, to the printers. There was a delay at the printers due to the pressure of work and in the meantime, another famous writer's autobiography came out. Narayana Das called off the project because of his obsessive desire to be 'second to none'. Thus was lost to the public not only an opportunity to read the great man's life story told in his own words with remarkable candor but also his perspective of his literary output and the literary and cultural zeitgeist of his time.

In the parlance of modern behavioral sciences, the term self-actualization is defined as a fundamental tendency to maximum realization and fulfilment of one's potential. In the case of an artiste, this means he tends to write, compose or perform to satisfy an inner urge oblivious to the environment. He competes only with himself. He sets his own standards of performance and after achieving them keeps raising them to a higher level. It is a continual upward spiral.

Self-actualization was the leitmotif of Narayana Das's life in all the fields he worked in, be it literature, music or other performing arts such as Avadahanam, and Hari Katha. He brushed aside fame and fortune. For example, it was said that he did not approve of a move to nominate him for the Nobel literary prize. The philosopher in him made him decline offers to be made court musician by the Maharajah of Mysore and later by the Maharaja of Vizianagaram, instead preferring an independent life lead in the service of God.

Even when he consented to head 'Shri Vijayarama Gana Pathashala', the music college the Maharajah of Vizianagaram founded for the express purpose of honoring him, he insisted that it be treated as a temple for Sri Rama and him as His servant. The only vanity he permitted himself was that he wanted to be second to none!

== Philosophy Facet ==
His magnum opus was a two-volume philosophical work entitled Jagadjyoti, meaning "Universal Beacon", in which he recorded his musings on various Indian philosophical schools, even accommodating atheist school of thought.

== With Noted Contemporaries ==
- He was also the one who taught panini's Ashtadhyayi to Swami Vivekananda during his extensive travel of India in July 1890.
- Enraptured by his rendering of the Hindusthani Bhairavi raga, Rabindranath Tagore sought to introduce the curriculum followed by Narayana Das in his music college at Visva-Bharati University.
- It is said that his contemporary and educationalist Sir CR Reddy, the Vice Chancellor of Andhra university when he met Narayana Dasu garu, quipped "I am a mere Vice chancellor of a university, you are a walking university."
