= Maharajah's Government College of Music and Dance =

Government college in Andhra Pradesh, India

- Type: Government institution
- Established: 5 February 1919
- Principal: Buridi Anuradha Parasuram
- Location: Vizianagaram, Andhra Pradesh, India, Vizianagaram, Andhra Pradesh, India; 18°06′38″N 83°24′31″E
- Campus: Urban
- Website: mrgmusiccollege.ap.gov.in

Maharajah's Government College of Music and Dance (Telugu: మహారాజా ప్రభుత్వ సంగీత నృత్య కళాశాల) is an educational institution in Vizianagaram, Andhra Pradesh, India. It is the first music college in South India.

== Profile ==
It was established in 1919 by Pusapati Vijayarama Gajapathi Raju, Maharajah of Vizianagram. It was named "Sri Vijayarama Gana Pathasala".

Chaganti Jogarao was friend of Vijayarama Gajapati Raju. He had a son, Chaganti Gangaraju, who was blind and loved music. He urged the Maharajah to help him. He donated the Town Hall building behind the fort for the purpose and thus the music school was started. Adibhatla Narayana Dasu was chosen for its principal and Dwaram Venkataswamy Naidu as professor. After him, the institution was promoted as "Sri Vijayarama Music and Dance College" by Sri Alak Narayana Gajapati Raju and established more sections. The government of Andhra Pradesh took over its management on 15 August 1955. It is under the affiliation of Potti Sreeramulu Telugu University, Hyderabad. The later Maharajah P. V. G. Raju promoted it further.

Students learn vocal, classical dance, violin, veena, mridangam, nadaswaram and dolu. The college offers a two-year diploma course and a four-year certificate course in dance and music. Scholarships are awarded to meritorious students. Free food is sponsored by Sri Lakshmi Narasimha Swamy Devasthanam, Simhachalam for poor students.

The college organises Music Durbar and invites distinguished personalities to perform before their students. A music festival is organised annually during the Vinayaka Chaviti day with performances by teachers and students.

Buridi Laxmi Naidu, Vasa Venkata Rao, A.B.T. Sundaramma, Dokka Srirama Murthy and many other personalities worked in the Maharajah's Government College of Music and Dance.

== Principals ==
This is the complete list of principals:

- Ajjada Adibhatla Narayana Dasu (1919–1936)
- Dwaram Venkataswamy Naidu (1936–1952)
- Dwaram Narasinga Rao (1952–1960)
- Dwaram Bhavanarayana Rao (1962–1973)
- Nedunuri Krishna Murthy (1977–1979)
- Srirangam Gopalaratnam (1979–1980)
- Dwaram Durga Prasada Rao (1982–2000)
- P. V. S. Seshayya Sastry (2000–2007)
- Buridi Anuradha Parasuram (2007–present)

== Academics ==
- Certificate course of four years in vocal, violin, Veena, Mrudangam, Bharata Natyam, Nadaswaram and Dhol.
- Diploma course of two years in vocal, violin, veena, mrudangam, bharata natyam, nadaswaram and dhol.

== Notable alumni ==
- Bhuvaneshwar Mishra, musician of Orissa
- Chaganti Gangaraju, violinist
- Dwaram Bhavanarayana Rao, violinist and singer
- Dwaram Mangatayaru
- Dwaram Narasinga Rao, violinist
- Dwaram Satyanarayana Murthy
- Dwaram Tyagaraju
- Evaturi Vijayeswara Rao
- Ghantasala, film singer
- K. V. Reddy, eminent violinist
- Komanduri Krishnamacharyulu
- Manchala Jagannadha Rao, veena player
- Marella Kesava Rao
- Mullapudi Lakshmana Rao
- Mullapudi Srirama Murthy
- Nedunuri Krishna Murthy, Sangeeta Kalanidhi
- Nookala Chinna Satyanarayana
- P. Susheela, film playback singer
- Saluri Hanumantha Rao, film music director
- S. Rajeswara Rao, film music director
- Sripada Sanyasi Rao
- Vankayala Narasimham
- Garimella Naga Raja Rao, All India radio singer and musician
