= Brihaddeshi =

Information
- Author: Mataṅga Muni
- Language: Classical Sanskrit

Brihaddeshi is a Classical Sanskrit text, dated ca. 6th to 8th century CE, on Indian classical music, attributed to Mataṅga Muni. It is the first text to speak directly of the raga and to distinguish marga ("classical") from desi ("folk") music. It also introduced sargam solfège (or solfa), the singing of the first syllable of the names of the musical notes, as an aid to learning and performance. (The full names of the notes existed previously, for example as found in Natya Shastra.)

The author based his work on Bharata Muni's Natya Shastra. His discussion of musical scales and micro-tonal intervals clarifies Bharata's work, and also clarifies Bharata's terse presentation of many issues related to śruti.

The text uses a two-dimensional prastāra (matrix) to explain how the 7 notes of the octave map into 22 śrutis, with varying distances between notes. It also says that a finer subdivision in microtones has 66 śrutis; and that, in principle, the number of śrutis is infinite.

The text also speaks of the division of the octave into 12 svaras. According to Prem Lata Sharma, this is the first known text to speak of 12 notes.

== Editions ==
The text of Brihaddeshi was edited by Prem Lata Sharma for the Indira Kalakendra series of original texts on the Indian arts and was published as a book "Matanga and His Work Brihaddesi" in 1992. Dwaram Bhavanarayana Rao published a Telugu translation and paraphrase in 2002.
