= Nookala Chinna Satyanarayana =

Indian carnatic musician (1923–2013)

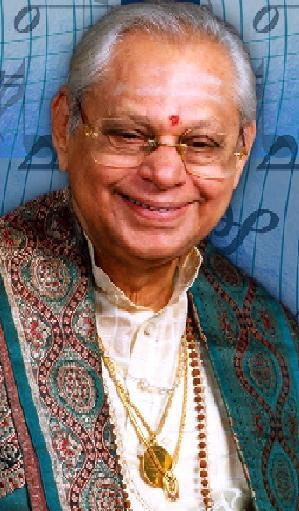

Background information
- Born: 4 August 1923
- Origin: Anakapalli, Andhra Pradesh, India
- Died: 11 July 2013 (aged 89)
- Genre: Carnatic classical music
- Occupation: Classical Vocalist
- Years active: 1945–2013
- Website: Official site

Mahamahopadhyaya Dr. Nookala Chinna Satyanarayana (4 August 1923 – 11 July 2013) was a Carnatic musician, a classical vocalist, musicologist, author and teacher, a great administrator and motivator. He was a performer on All India Radio and Doordarshan who participated in Sangeeta Sammelans, outdoor broadcasts and national programmes innumerable times. His radio lessons and Bhakti Ranjanis were very popular. He was awarded Padma Bhushan award by the Government of India in 2010.

== Early life ==
Nookala Chinna Satyanarayana was born in Anakapalli, Andhra Pradesh, the son of Annapurneswara Sarma and Yegnachayanamma. His father, Annapurneswara Sarma, was a 'Srividya' upasaka (a scholar and priest of high rank). His mother Yegnachayanamma gave him basic training in classical music and fostered his talent. His father always motivated and encouraged him.

== Career ==
Nookala, when young, entered the traditional theatre and handled a few boy roles but classical music attracted him from the start. He has started as violin student. Sri Kambhampati Akkaji Rao led him to Mangalampally Pattabhiramayya at Vijayawada, under whose guidance he remained for three years, after which he made his way to Vijayanagaram to learn violin under Prof. Dwaram Venkataswamy Naidu garu. Nookala accompanied Prof. Naidu garu on his concerts all over India, and Prof. Naidu garu introduced Nookala to Dr. Sripada Pinakapani. His singing style developed after he came under the influence of Dr. Pinakapani. Nookala sharpened his analytical approach, achieving a deeper understanding of the science and art of music and learnt to infuse the raga bhava in every note and phrase of the kriti.

Nookala was attracted by several musical greats but developed his own style of singing, never departing from classicism, yet expressing the beauty of 'raga' and the meaning of the 'kriti', with special emphasis on diction.

=== Government service career ===
During his administrative career spans over four decades: he has held various posts and positions, including:

- Professor, Maharajah's Government College of Music and Dance, Vizianagaram
- Professor, Telugu University, Hyderabad
- Principal, Govt. Music College of Secunderabad
- Principal, Govt. Music College of Hyderabad
- Principal, Govt. Music College of Vijayawada
- Principal, Sri Venkateswara College of Tirupati

== Personal life ==
Nookala was married to Sesha, daughter of Annapurna and Ayyalasomayajula Kameswar Rao, a 'Srividya' upasaka: they have seven children.

== Positions held ==
- Founder President of Viswakala Parishat
- Chairman Board of Studies – Andhra University
- Chairman Board of Studies – Sri Venkateswara University
- Expert Member – Andhra University
- Expert Member – Madras Music Academy
- Member Audition Board and Committee – All India Radio

== Awards ==
- Padma Bhushan by Government of India in 2010
- Hamsa Award or Kala Ratna (Cultural Council Government of Andhra Pradesh)
- Annamacharya Vidwanmani ('Sapna' – Sri Annamacharya Project of North America, Chicago)
- Sangeeta Kala Acharya (Music Academy, Chennai)
- Sangeeta Vidya Nidhi (Andhra Music Academy, Bhimily)
- Vani Kala Sudhakara (Bangalore Gayan Samaj, Centenary Celebrations, Bangalore)
- Saptagiri Sangeeta Vidwanmani (Sri Tyagaraja Festival Committee, Tirupati)
- Nada Nidhi (Sri Ganapathi Sachidananda Swamy)
- Nada Hridayagnaha (Swami Dayananda Saraswati)
- Nada Sudharnava (Murali Ravali, Madras)
- Sangeeta Sarvabuama (Sri Maruti Tyagaraja Gana Sabha, Tirupati)
- Sangeeta Ksheera Sagara (Sri Tyagaraja Narayanadasa Seva Samithi, Rajahmundry)
- Ganakala Ghandarva (Vamshi Arts Theatres, Hyderabad)
- Lakshya Lakshana Marthanda
- Sangeeta Sudhakara
- Emipatus Fellowship from Govt. of India
- President's Sangeeta Nataka Academy Award
- Senior Fellowship of Department of Culture Govt. of India
- Mahamahopadya

He is the Asthana Vidwan of

- Sri Tirumala Tirupati Devastanam – Tirupati and Pitsburg, U.S.A.
- Kanchi Kamakoti Peetham of Kanchi
- Sringeri Sankara Peetham of Sringeri
- Pushpagiri Peetham of Pushpagiri
- Ganapati Sachidananda Ashram – Mysore

== Teaching ==
Nookala performed around India. He was the favourite choice of SPICMACAY Society for Promoting Interest in Classical Music and Culture among Youth. He was skilled in the South Indian style and was also well informed of Hindustani style of music which enables comparative study.

Nookala has traveled to United States of America, Canada, the United Kingdom, Ireland, Malaysia, Singapore, and Mauritius. He has given performances and lecture demonstrations and conducted workshops in several universities including Cambridge, Oxford, Edinburgh, London and Wakefield in the U.K. and Wesleyan, Wisconsin, Colombia and Colorado in U.S.A.

His lecture demonstrations are attended by students, teachers and academics. He compares the Carnatic music system with other systems, including Hindustani as well as western classical music while being an ambassador of Carnatic music. He has a passion for teaching and enjoys it very much. The title Mahamahopadhyaya is given to a musician who has trained a hundred students. Dr. Nookala has several hundreds of students ranging from beginners to doctorate trainees, five-year-olds to 75-year-olds, prodigies to minimum gifted students.

Dr. Nookala founded Viswakala Parishat, a non-profit organization for the cause of music and related activities which holds chamber music concerts and conducts music festivals and launches young and talented artists.

== Books ==
- Sangeeta Sudha a course of lessons including Saralis, Alankaras, Geethams, Varnams with notation published in English and Telugu.
- Ragalakshana Sangraham

A reference book of the lakshanas or features of 250 ragas with examples in sanchari listing the compositions and viseshana prayogas in detail. This is available in Telugu and in English under the name "Ragas Of Indian Music"

- The Monograph Of Tyagaraja's Pancharatna Kritis

A work on the 'Magnum Opus' of a saint composer. It covers every aspect of the five monumental compositions giving word by word meaning, extended meaning and a commentary correlating the swara sahitya relationship. He has examined and analyzed the kritis from the three angles of literature, music and spiritualism excelling in every aspect. This book is available in both English and Telugu.

- Deekshithar's Navagraha and Kamalamba Navaavarna Kritis

Meaning, sahitya with notation and an in depth commentary. This book is available in both English and Telugu.

- Sri Tyagaraja Saraswata Sarvaswam

All the kritis of Sri Tyagaraja with commentary and meaning. This book is available only in Telugu.

- Sangeeta Saastra Sudhaarnavam

Some aspects of the science and art of Indian Music. It deals mainly with Carnatic Music but some aspects of Hindustani and western music are also presented briefly. This book is available in both Telugu and English under the name "The Science of Indian Music"

- Vaggeyakara Kriti Sagaram

This book contains lyrics with notations, of great composers and musicians of ancient India like Tyagaraja, Deekshitar, Syamasastry, Annamayya and also contemporary musicians like Dr.Mangalampally Balamurali Krishna and Dr.Sripada Pinakapani Garu. It is a treasure of classical Musical Compositions. This book is available in 2 volumes and is available only in Telugu.

== Death ==
Despite his advanced age and failing health, Nookala participated in many programmes and toured abroad. His condition worsened by 2013 and he died on 11 July 2013, less than a month before his 90th birthday.
