= Ajjada =

- village
- Interactive map of Ajjada
- Location in Andhra Pradesh, India Ajjada (India)
- Coordinates: 18°40′31.87″N 83°29′13.19″E
- Country: India
- State: Andhra Pradesh
- District: Parvathipuram Manyam

Languages
  - Official: Telugu
- Time zone: UTC+5:30 (IST)
- PIN: 535546
- Vehicle registration: AP-35
- Nearest city: Bobbili, Parvathipuram
- Lok Sabha constituency: Araku
- Vidhan Sabha constituency: Parvathipuram

Ajjada is a village in Balijipeta mandal, Parvathipuram Manyam district of Andhra Pradesh, India. It has a population of 2,700 with male:female ratio of 1:1 and 40% literacy rate. It is located within the India Standard Time Zone (GMT+5:30). Note that this is a special half-hour time zone.

== Eminent people ==
It is the birthplace of Telugu Harikatha Pithamahaa Ajjada Adibhatla Narayana Dasu.
