= Bhavana Reddy =

Indian classical dancer and singer

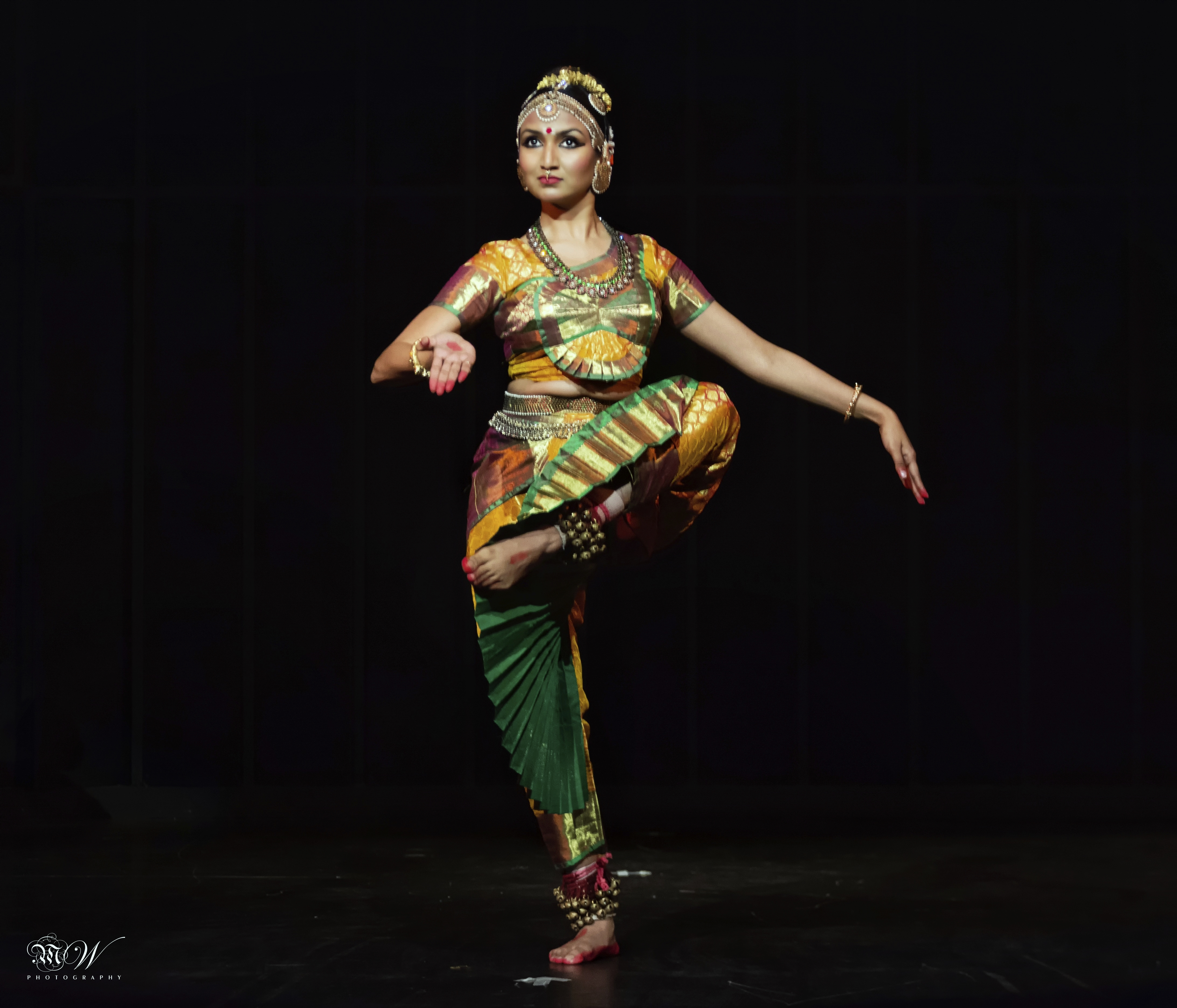
- Reddy performing Kuchipudi

Background information
- Genres: Indian classical dance
- Occupations: Kuchipudi Indian classical dancer, singer-songwriter
- Years active: 1994–present
- Website: https://www.bhavanareddy.com/

Bhavana Reddy is an Indian classical Kuchipudi dancer, singer, songwriter, and guru/teacher. She is the younger daughter and disciple of renowned dancing couple Raja Radha Reddy and Kaushalya Reddy. Bhavana Reddy is the founder of the International Center for Kuchipudi Dance (ICKD). As of April 2026, became one of the Directors at Natya Tarangi, the Kuchipudi institute founded by Padma Bhushans Raja Radha Reddy.

== Early life ==
Bhavana Reddy was born and raised in New Delhi, India. Her family is in the Limca Book of Records for being the world's first and only family dedicated to Kuchipudi. Bhavana is the younger daughter of Padmabhushans Drs. Raja Radha Reddy and Kaushalya Reddy, and the younger sister of Yamini Reddy.

As a young girl in New Delhi, Bhavana attended junior school at Raghubir Singh Junior Modern School, and then went on to study at Modern School, Barakhamba. She graduated with a B Com Honors Degree from Lady Shri Ram College for Women. Bhavana's formal training in Kuchipudi dance began at age four under the guidance of her parents.

== Dance ==
Bhavana has spent over two decades devoted to Kuchipudi learning both dance and theory. She began performing with her family on global tours at the age of five. The first record of a major performance by Bhavana was at the ICCR Auditorium, Azad Bhawan New Delhi for which she was also recognized as a rising star in HT city newspaper. Other records show her as the youngest performer in the history of the Bhaskar Rao Sangeet Sammelan, Chandigarh where at age seven she shared the stage with her parents and as a solo performer in their family productions.

Bhavana took lead roles in productions since she was a young child. When she was age six she played Krishna (executing Makhan Chori, Kalinga Nartana solo, Cheer Haran and Raas Leela) in productions like Krishna Leela Tarangini. At age seven, Bhavana played Prahlada in Prahlada Charitram. In 2016, Bhavana played the role of Shandilya in Bhagvadajjukyam. In 2011, Bhavana played the lead role of Satyabhama in Bhamakalapam, an iconic and traditional Kuchipudi piece. Bhavana has several other solo performances to her credit as well as productions conducted with the Reddy family.

Professionally, Bhavana toured Europe, USA, Canada, South East Asia, Middle East and India - several times before she turned 16, including performing for dignitaries and performing at several prestigious venues around the world. She received a certificate in Natya Sastra Karana studies under Guru Padma Subrahmanyam.

Bhavana founded the international branch of the Natya Tarangini Kuchipudi Dance Institute in April 2020. The school celebrated its first anniversary 16 April 2021. Additionally, as Director of the Delhi branch of Natya Tarangini, she is actively involved with organizing events and teaching. She is the principal soloist and the assistant choreographer to Dr. Raja Radha Reddy and also stars in and runs her own solo dance company.

== Music ==
Bhavana graduated from the Musicians Institute in Hollywood, California with an Associate of Arts Degree in Vocal Performance. She was the recipient of the Outstanding Artist Award in the program of Independent Artistry.

She began learning South Indian Classical Carnatic vocals at four years old from Guru Kannakumar, and subsequently Durga Prasad from whom she also learned Carnatic violin until her late teens. During college, Bhavana learnt from All India Radio Director Shri K. Vageesh under whom she still learns vocals.

As an international artist, she released a solo EP Tangled in Emotions and has sung the title track ("The End") on Hollywood production, Joy Ride 3: Roadkill. Bhavana has performed at the Grammy Awards After Party.

== Awards ==
Some of her awards include:

- Government of India Sangeet Natak Akademi’s Bismillah Khan Yuva Puraskar 2017
- Lifetime Achievement Award for Contribution to Kuchipudi Dance by Telugu Cultural Association, Houston Texas
- FICCI Young Women Achievers Award
- Femina North Powerlist Award

== Notable works ==
Some of her notable works include:

- A modern rendition of a traditional Kuchipudi dance drama Bhamakalapam that also featured at India Dans Festival Korzo Netherlands
- Om Shivam, Uske Raah Mein (a sufi Kuchipudi production)
- Faces -- a production combining Western Music compositions of hers with traditional Kuchipudi Dance.
- Kuchipudi dance to Stravinski's Rite of Spring, a collaboration Reddy staged at the Walt Disney Concert Hall, Los Angeles for the Los Angeles Philharmonic Orchestra
- A solo debut music album named "Tangled In Emotions" - written, composed, arranged and produced by Bhavana herself has the involvement of notable industry professionals in Los Angeles including engineering by John Would (grammy nominated for Idle Wheel by Fiona Apple), Reuben Cohen (Game of Thrones, Snoop Dogg) etc. She funded this album solely through indiegogo crowdfunding.
- Kuchipudi recital at Kennedy Center (Washington, DC, USA)

== Online Dance School ==
International Center For Kuchipudi Dance
