= Kali Temple, Visakhapatnam =

Temple in India

Kali Temple
- Location in Visakhapatnam

Religion
- Affiliation: Hinduism
- Deity: Kali

Location
- Location: Visakhapatnam
- State: Andhra Pradesh
- Country: India
- Interactive map of Kali Temple
- Coordinates: 17.712448°N 83.318595°E

The Sri Kalimatha temple of Visakhapatnam is dedicated to the Goddess Kali. The temple is located near RK Beach, Visakhapatnam, Andhra Pradesh.

== History ==
The temple was built in 1984. The Vijayadashami festival is celebrated here during the Hindu calendar month of Ashvin (Gregorian calendar: September to October, near the equinox). The Kali temple is a visible landmark on RK Beach Road and a popular tourist destination.

== Location and Architecture ==
This temple is centrally located on the busy RK Beach Road between businesses, corporate buildings and residences. All corners of the city are well connected to this temple. The temple sits directly across the road from the beach and the Bay of Bengal. The temple is built in the navaratna ("nine spires") style, similar to the Dakshineswar Kali temple in Kolkata, West Bengal.
