= RK Beach =

Beach in Visakhapatnam, India

Ramakrishna Beach
- Beach
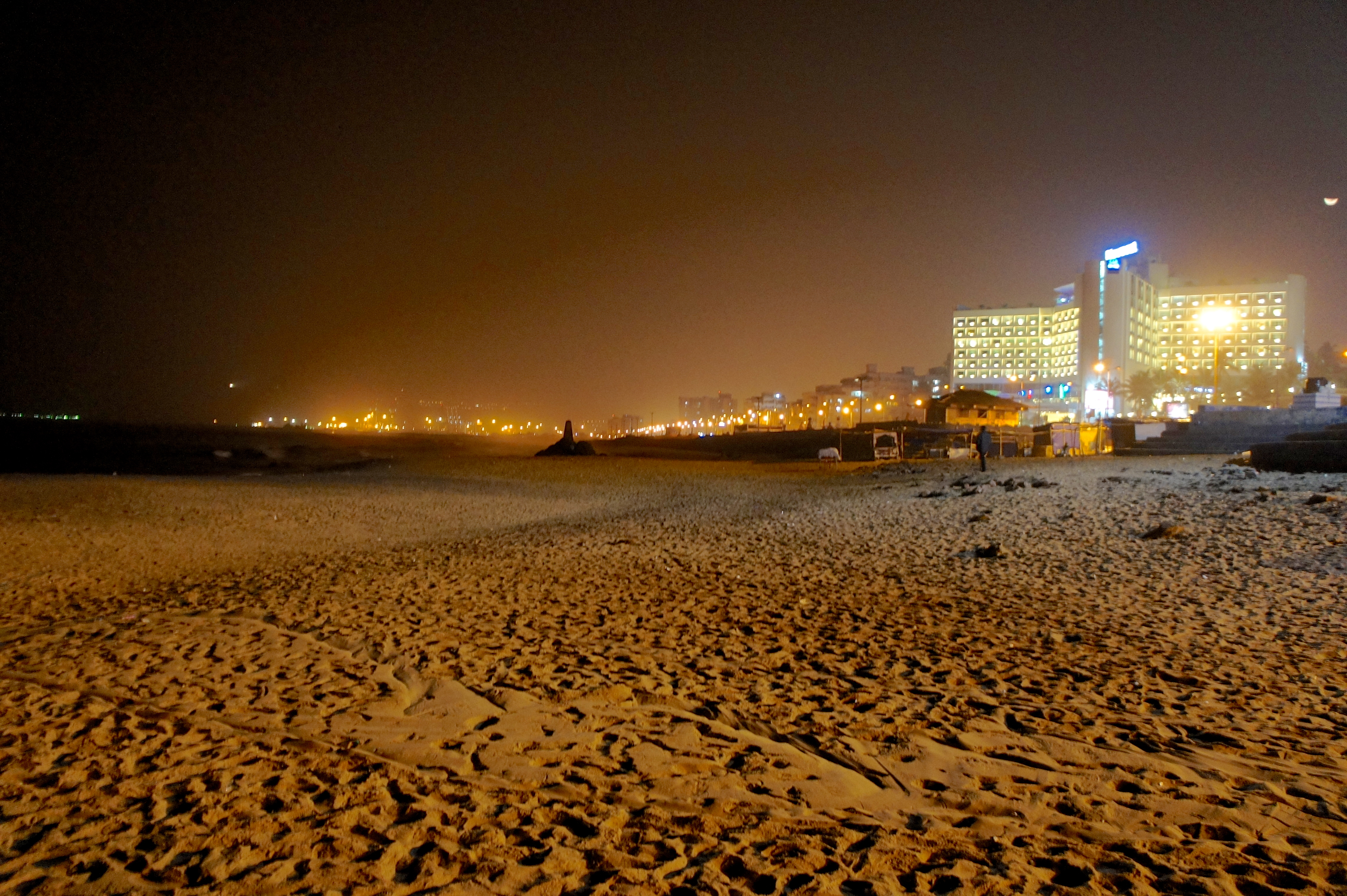
- RK Beach Night View

- Coordinates: 17°42′51″N 83°19′25″E
- Location: Beach Road, Visakhapatnam, Andhra Pradesh, India

Dimensions
  - Length: 3.7 km (2.3 mi)

Ramakrishna Beach also known as R K Beach is situated on the east coast of Bay of Bengal in Visakhapatnam, Andhra Pradesh. It is located near Dolphin's Nose.

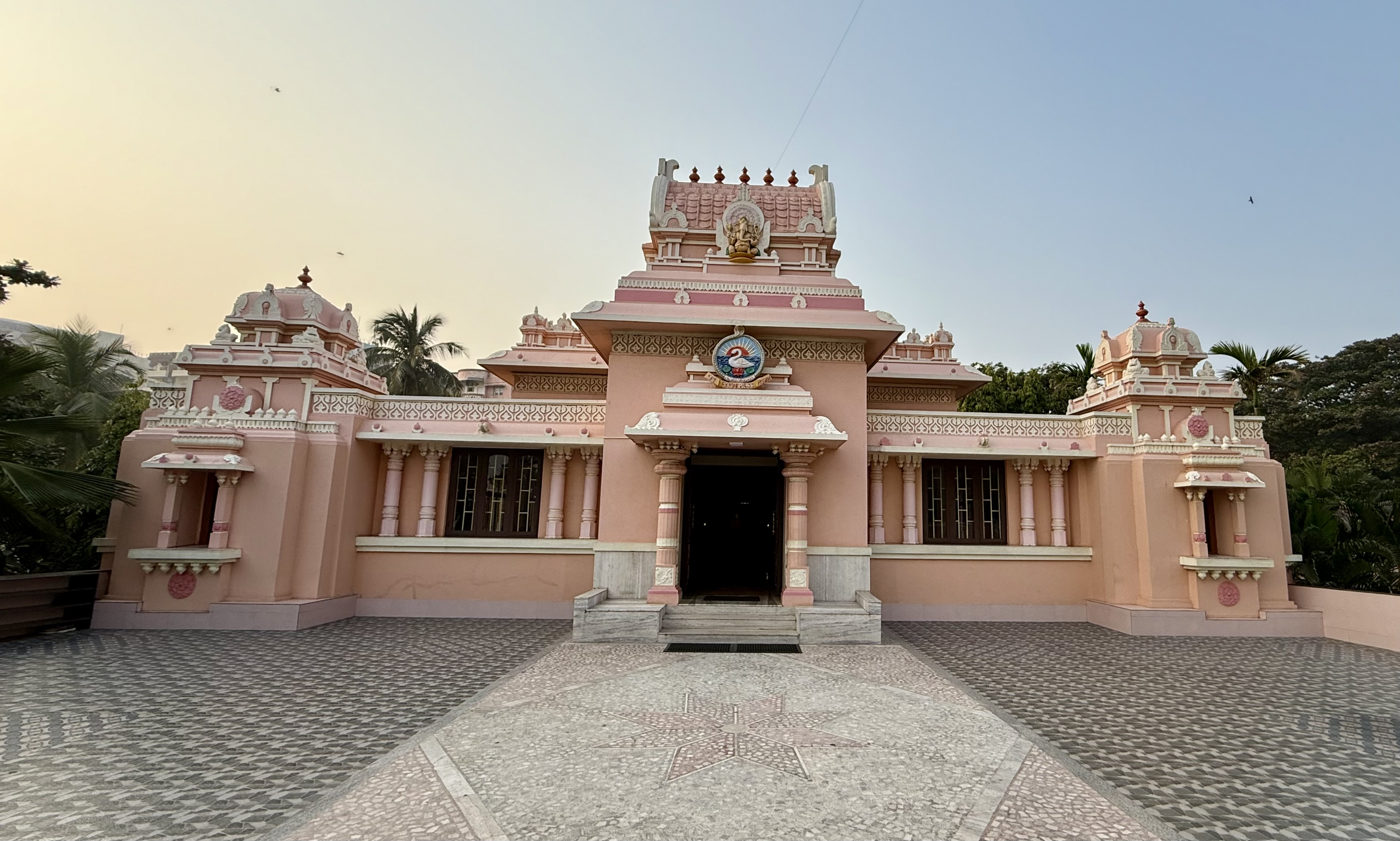
Ramakrishna Math, Visakhapatnam

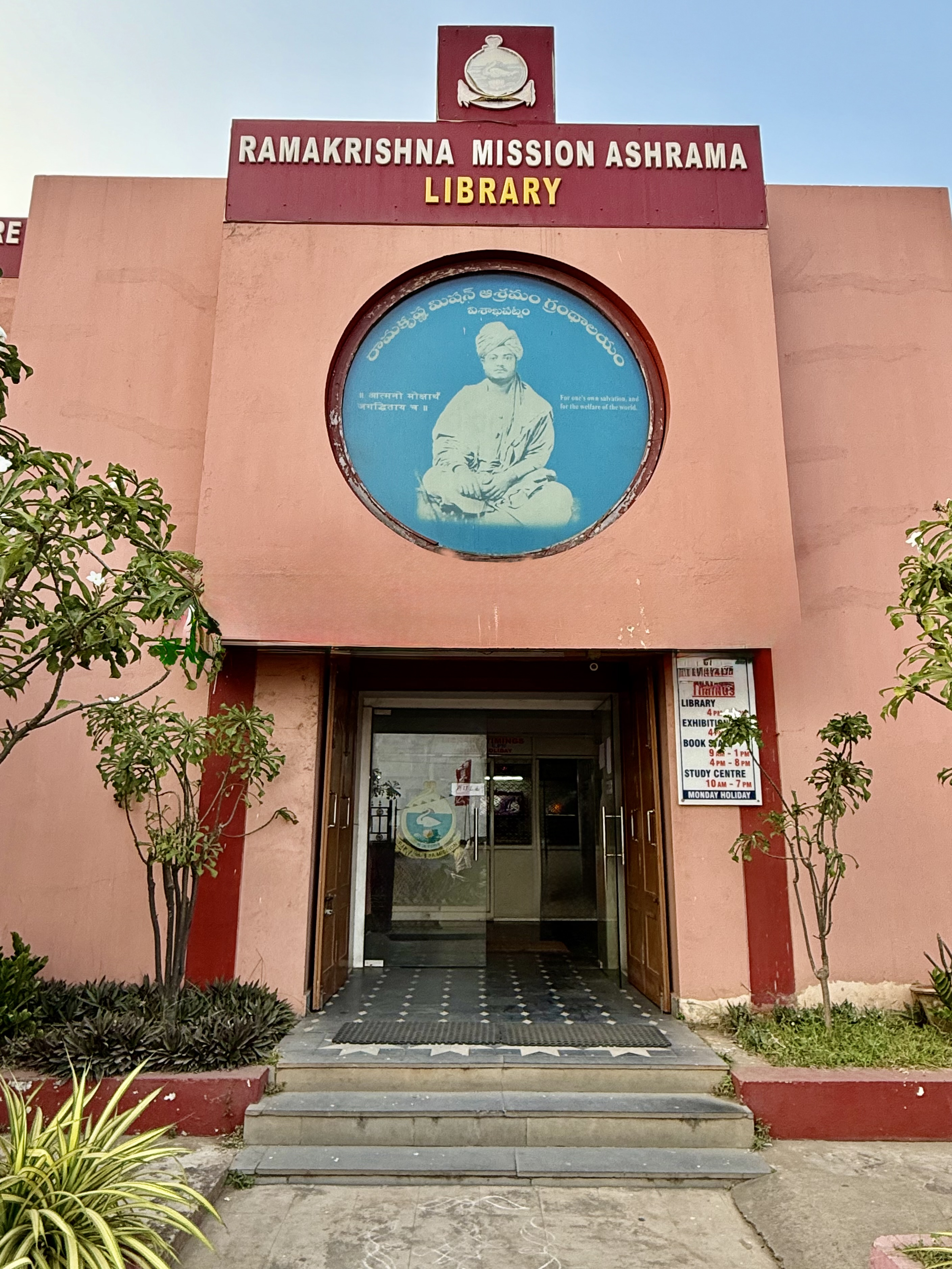
Ramakrishna Mission Ashrama Library, Visakhapatnam

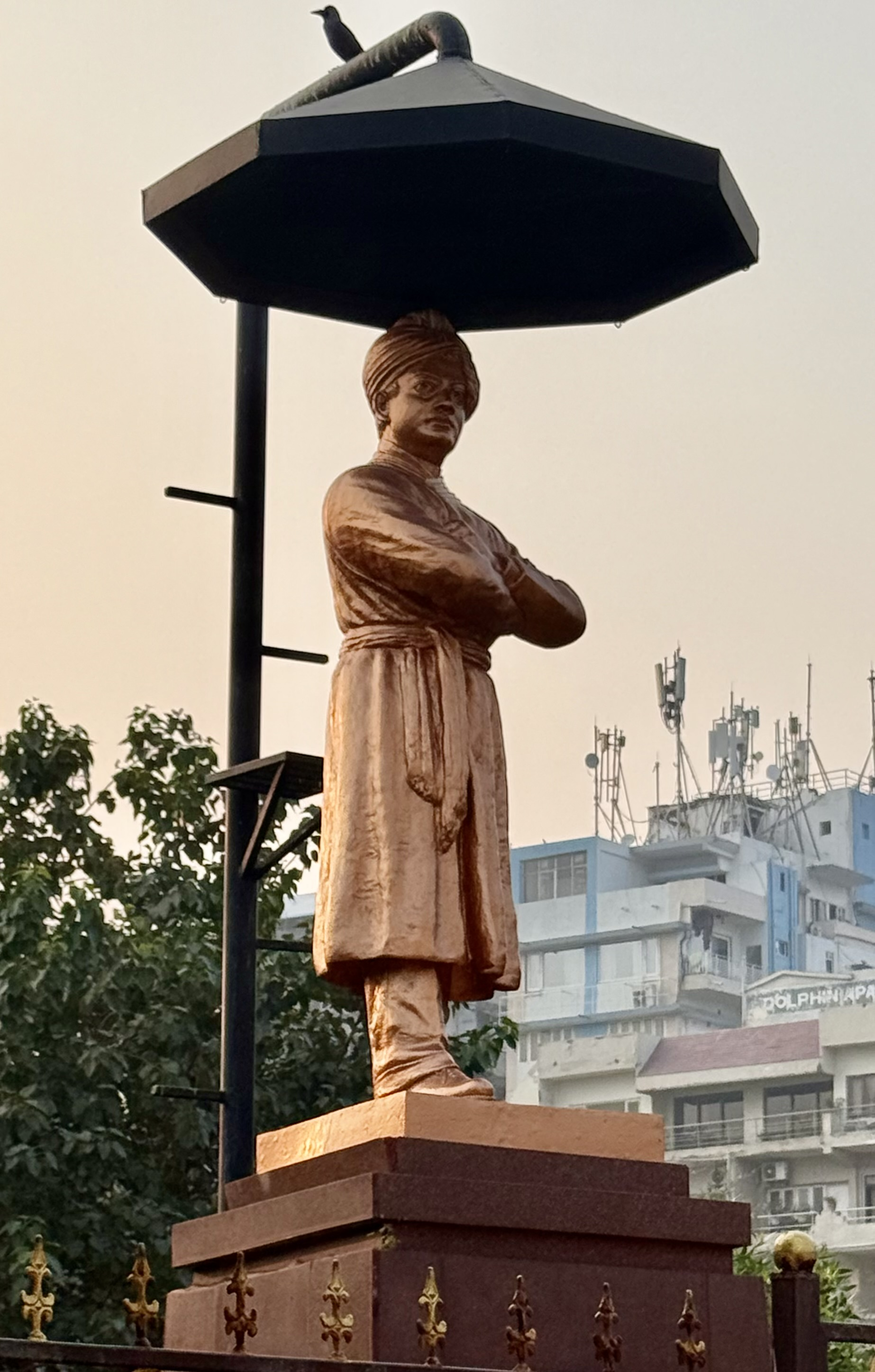
Statue of Sri Vivekananda Swamy, Ramakrishna Math, Visakhapatnam

RK Beach gets its name from the Ramakrishna Mission ashram situated near the beach.

== Gallery ==
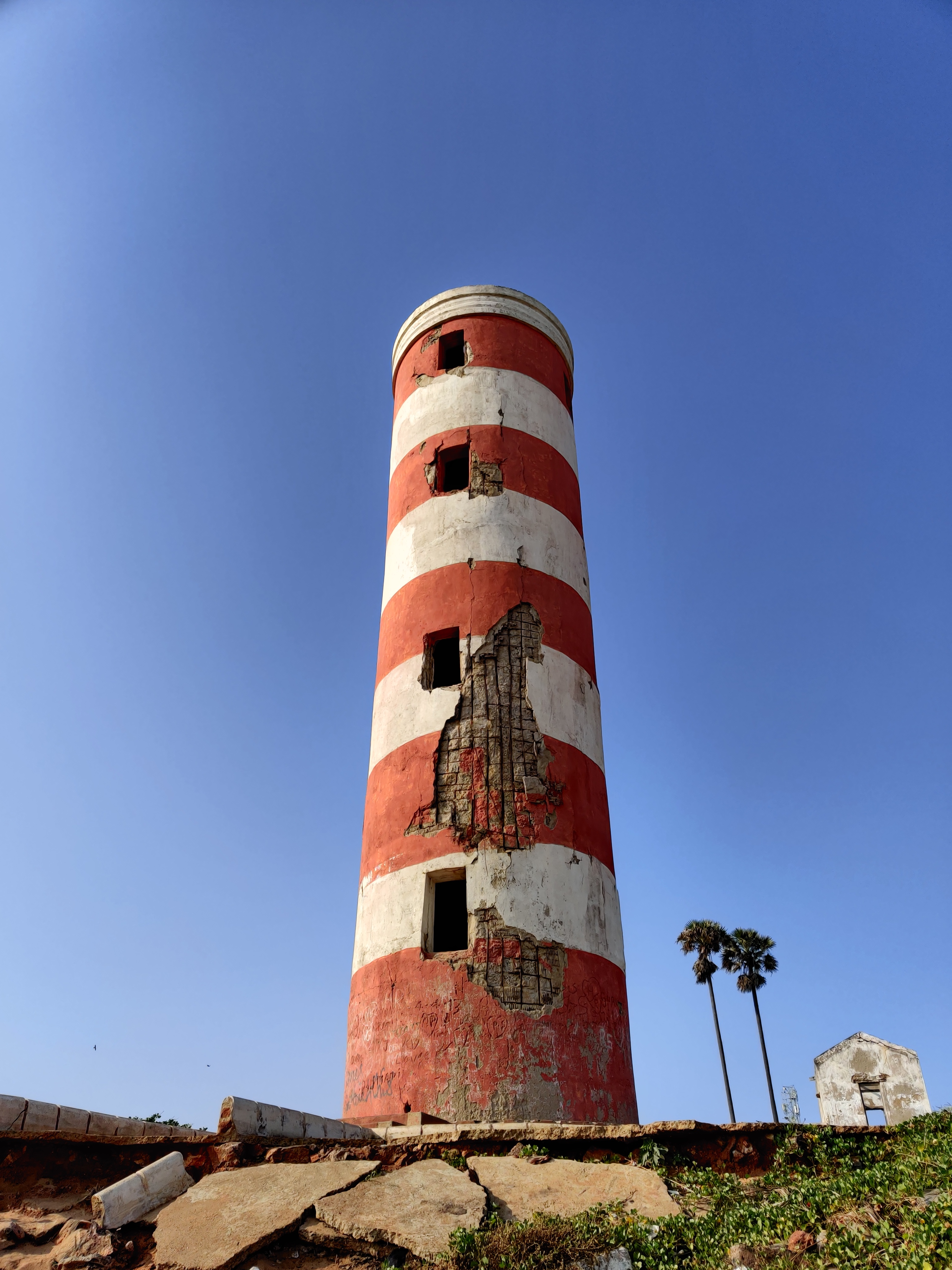
Lighthouse on Visakhapatnam beach

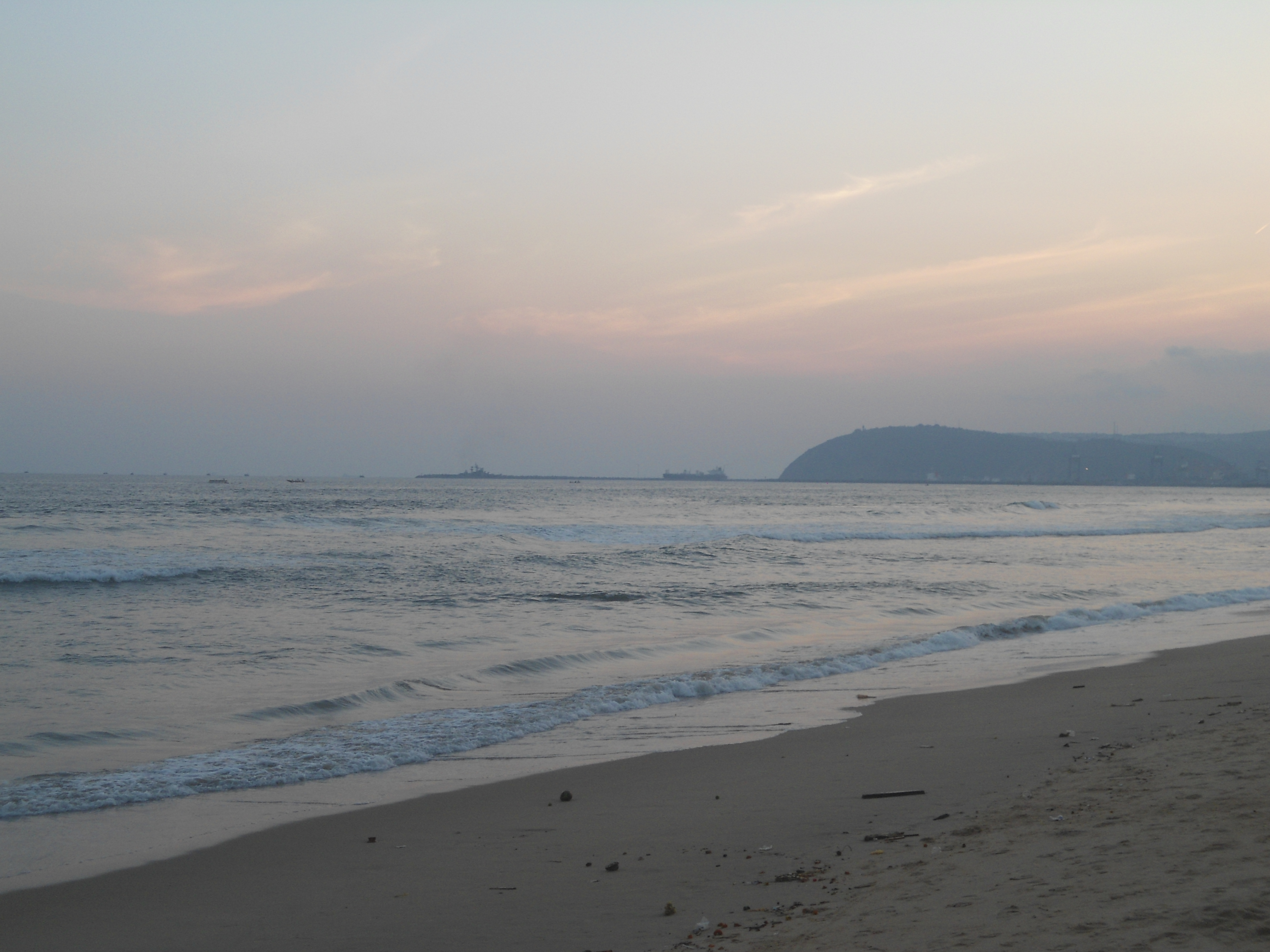
RK Beach at sunset

== Transportation ==
APSRTC runs buses to this area along these routes:

Route number	Start	End	Via
10K	RTC complex	Kailasagiri	Jagadamba junction, RK beach, VUDA park, Tenneti Park
28	RK Beach	Simhachalam	Collector office, KGH, Jagadamba Centre, RTC Complex, Kancharapalem, NAD Kotharoad, Gopalapatnam
28K/28A	RK Beach	Kothavalasa/Pendurthi	Collector office, KGH, Jagadamba Centre, RTC Complex, Kancharapalem, NAD Kotharoad, Gopalapatnam, Vepagunta, Sujatha Nagar
28H	RK Beach	Simhachalam Hill	Collector office, KGH, Jagadamba Centre, RTC Complex, Railway Station, Kancharapalem, NAD Kotharoad, Gopalapatnam
99/99K	RK Beach	Old Gajuwaka/Kurmannapalem	Jagadamba Centre, Town Kotharoad, Convent, Scindia, Malkapuram, New Gajuwaka
68/68K	RK Beach	Pendurthi/Kothavalasa	Collector office, KGH, Jagadamba Centre, Rednam gardens, RTC Complex, Maddilapalem, Hanumanthuwaka, Arilova, Mudasarlova, Adavivaram
25M	RK Beach	Marikavalasa Colony	Jagadamba Centre, RTC Complex, Maddilapalem, Hanumanthuwaka, Yendada, Madhurawada

== See also ==
- List of beaches in India
- Kali Temple, Visakhapatnam
