= Raja and Radha Reddy =

Kuchipudi dancers pair

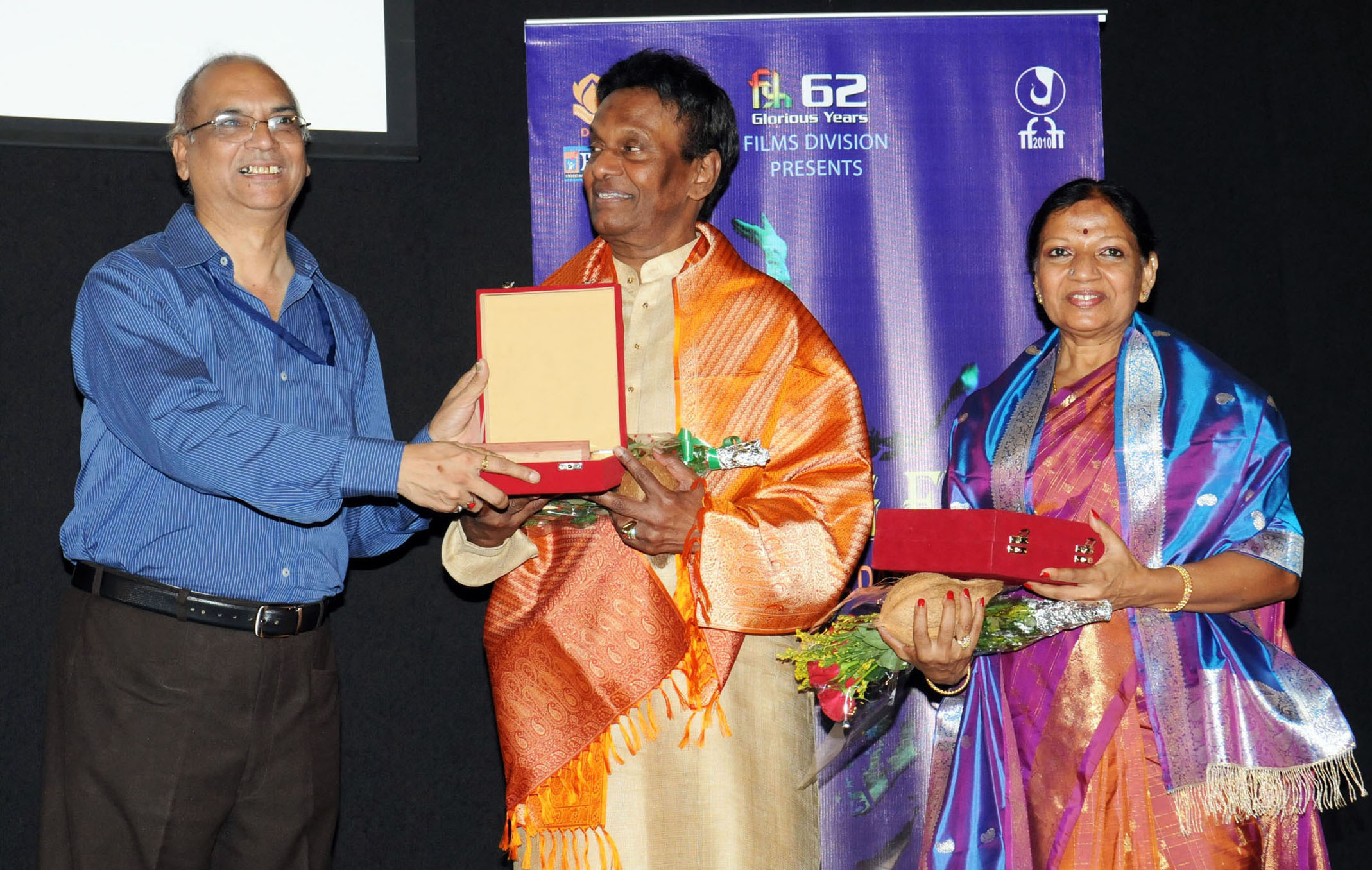
- Raja (middle) and Radha Reddy (right), being felicitated at IFFI (2010)
- Born: Raja Reddy; 6 October 1943 (age 82); Narsapur(g), hyderabad state Radha Reddy; 15 February 1955 (age 71); Kotalgaon, Hyderabad State, India
- Known for: Indian Classical Dance
- Movement: Kuchipudi
- Awards: Padma Shri; Padma Bhushan(2000)
- Website: rajaradhareddy.com

Raja (born 6 October 1943) and Radha Reddy (born 15 February 1955) are an Indian Kuchipudi dancing couple, gurus and choreographers. They are renowned as exponents of the South Indian dance form of Kuchipudi. They founded and run the Natya Tarangini Institute of Kuchipudi Dance in New Delhi. The duo are credited with having given Kuchipudi a new dimension without compromising on its traditional virtues. For their services to the field of arts, the Government of India has conferred on them the Padma Shri and Padma Bhushan awards.

== Early life and family ==
Raja Reddy was born on 6 October 1943 in Narasapur(g), while Radha Reddy was born on 15 February 1955 in Kotalgaon, Adilabad district of present-day Telangana.

Raja Reddy holds a Diploma in Choreography and has a bachelor's degree from the Osmania University. Radha Reddy also has a Diploma in Choreography. In 2010 the duo were conferred honorary doctorates by the University of Hyderabad for their contributions to Kuchipudi. Raja Reddy is married to Radha and her sister Kaushalya, also a Kuchipudi dancer.

Raja Radha Reddy and Kaushalya have two children Yamini and Bhavana Reddy, also Kuchipudi dancers.

== Performing career ==
Raja Reddy's interest in Kuchipudi began in childhood as he watched performances of Kuchipudi Bhagavatam by touring folk troupes in his home district of Adilabad and later reached a turning point after he saw a performance of Vyjayanthimala’s Nagin. Radha followed him into Kuchipudi after their wedding. The duo learnt Kuchipudi under their guru Vedantam Prahalada Sarma of Eluru. In 1966, on a Government of Andhra Pradesh scholarship, they went to Delhi where they studied choreography and other stage arts under Guru Maya Rao at Natya Ballet Centre. Their talent was soon noted and they were invited to dance with doyen of the time including Indrani Rehman. Their first big break came in 1970 when their performance at the Theatre Tamil Nadu was widely well reviewed and received. Their performances were also noted by the then Minister for Tourism, Dr. Karan Singh and by Prime Minister Indira Gandhi who allotted them a house in Delhi after witnessing their performance during the celebrations of Nehru's birth anniversary. They have since gone on to perform at venues all over the globe. Raja trained students with hearing and speech impairment and at the Blind Relief Association. He has also set to dance a piece based on three poems of former President APJ Abdul Kalam. In their careers spanning over five decades and still counting, Drs.Raja and Radha Reddy are the first Indian dancers to perform in the International Dance Festival of Avignon in France and Salzburg (Austria) and the Festivals of India in the USA, UK and Bangladesh. In Ja Radha Reddy inaugurated the "Play House Theatre" in Durban (South Africa) when it was opened to general public post-apartheid, they performed on Mississippi river for the Late President Ford (facilitated by T.N Kaul, then Indian Ambassador to the US) and a galaxy of notable personalities across the globe. They have been conferred India's highest civilian awards Padma Shree and Padma Bhushan, Sangeet Natak Akademi and Nritya Choodamani Awards. They choreographed for the tree of knowledge segment in the Commonwealth Games opening ceremony in Delhi 2010.

== Natya Tarangini ==
Raja and Radha started the Natya Tarangini Institute of Kuchipudi dance, which is located in the Saket locality of New Delhi. The institute trains students in classical dance, music, yoga and Sanskrit. The institute also has a mini auditorium, an art gallery and hostel facility on its premises. The Institute hosts the annual dance and music festival, Parampara Series as well as the Shreyasi International Dance Festival which showcases artistes drawn from across the world. The Moscow Classical Ballet, the Paul Taylor Dance Company, flamenco dancer Jose Porcel and whirling dervishes are among the groups that have performed at the festival.

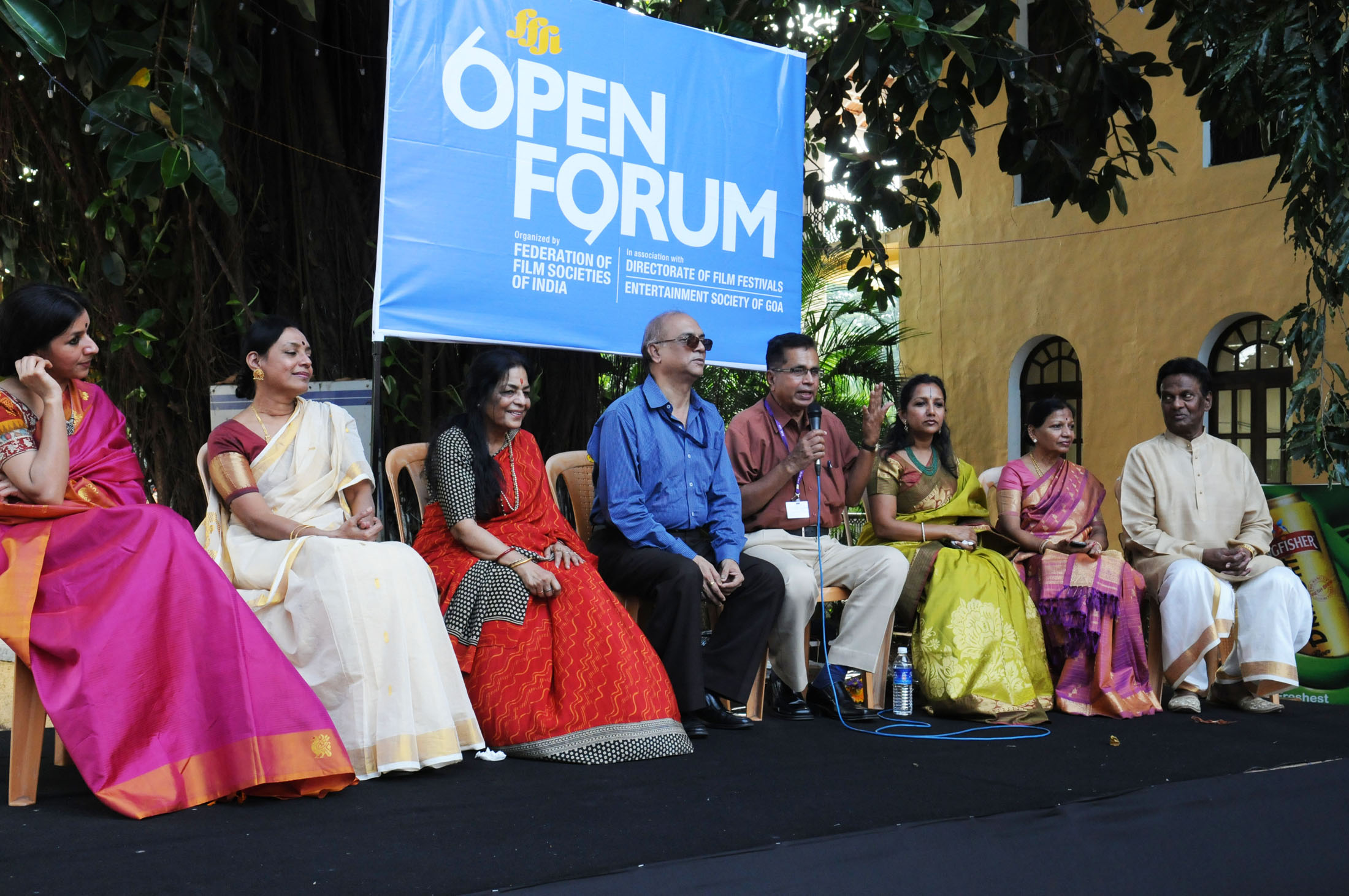
Raja and Radha Reddy (right), at IFFI (2010) Open Forum

== Awards ==
- Padma Shri in 1984
- Padma Bhushan in 2000
- Sangeet Natak Akademi Award
- Lifetime Achievement Award — The Rotary Club Delhi
- Doctorates by the University of Hyderabad
