= Jatavallabhula Purushottam =

Indian poet, author, and activist (1906-?)

Jatavallabhula Purushottam M.A.
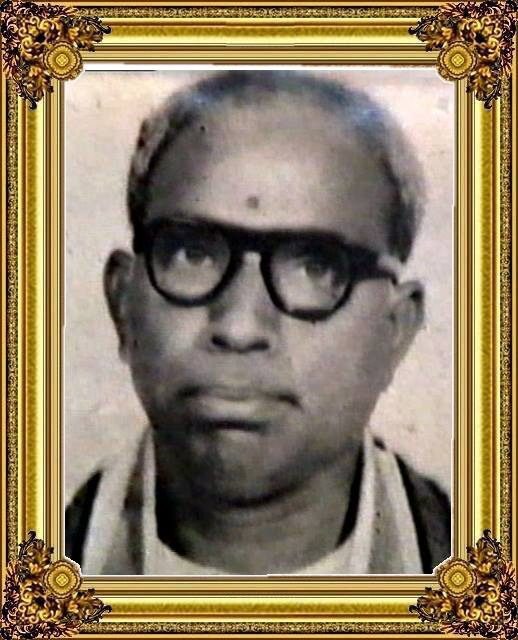
- Born: 17 February 1906; Nadavapalli

Jatavallabhula Purushottam (born 17 February 1906, date of death unknown) was an Indian poet, author and activist who was the first president of Vishva Hindu Parishad in Andhra Pradesh. Purushottam was born at a village in the East Godavari district of Andhra Pradesh. He was an orator and wrote poetry in Telugu and Sanskrit. Selected verses of his book Chitrasatakam are a part of the syllabus for 11th class students in Andhra Pradesh. Some of his books, e.g. Hindumatam, Dharma Manjari etc., were published by Tirumala Tirupathi Devstanam.
