= Mohd Amanullah Khan =

Indian politician

Moh Amanullah Khan served as the Member of the Legislative Assembly for Chandrayangutta constituency in Andhra Pradesh, India, between 1978 and 1999. He switched political allegiances on several occasions, being an independent candidate in 1978, 1983 and 1985 before representing the All India Majlis-e-Ittehadul Muslimeen in 1989 and then being a Majlis Bachao Tehreek candidate in 1994, a party he founded in 1993 after splitting from AIMIM
