= Pasam Jagannadham Naidu =

Pasam Jagannadham Naidu (born 13 November 1953) is a Telugu language journalist, writer, columnist and Editor-in-Chief of Telugu Patrika, and Managing Director of Jagan Raja Publications.

== Career ==
Pasam Jagannadham Naidu started his career as a reporter with Eenadu in 1980, Later worked with leading news papers like Udayam, Andhra Jyothy. He was made the Bureau Chief of vaartha after his most appreciated interview with Maoist leader ganapathy. In the year 1998, Naidu established 'Jagan Raja Publications' through which he started 'Telugu Patrika' a renowned evening daily. In 2002 'Telugu Patrika' expanded throughout Andhra Pradesh. During the total career, he has covered major regional and national stories, specializing in national politics. He has contributed to several books and writes fortnightly columns which appear in several newspapers.

== Political career ==
Pasam Jagannadham Naidu has also been active in politics for the Loksatta party and has contested for Chandragiri assembly constituency in the year 2009.

== Personal life ==
Pasam Jagannadham Naidu was born on 13 Nov 1953 in Pacchikalva Village, Tirupati to Pasam Mogili Naidu & Narayanamma. His brother Pasam Venkatrama Naidu is a Political Science Lecturer at Sri Venkateswara University, Tirupati. His Cousin, Sri Medasani Mohan is an Avadhani & Director of Annamacharya Project at Tirumala Tirupathi Devasthanams. Pasam Jagannadham Naidu is married to Chamundeshwari, with whom he has a son Ranjith Pasam, who is a filmmaker.
