= Dwaram Lakshmi =

- Born: Nellore, India
- Origin: residing: Tirupati, India
- Genre: Indian classical music
- Occupations: Singer

Dwaram Lakshmi is an Indian singer of classical carnatic and Hindustani music. She performs the bhajanas of Meera and Tulasidas and other composers of devotional music.

== Career ==
Dr Lakshmi participated in Radio Sangeetha Sammelan during 2007 and 2008. She has conducted workshops to popularise carnatic music.

== Family ==
Lakshmi is the granddaughter of violinist 'Sangeetha Kalanidhi', Padmasree Dwaram Venkataswamy Naidu and daughter of 'Sangeetha Kalaprapurna' Dwaram Bhavanarayana Rao and 'Veena Vidushi' Smt. Dwaram Venkata Varadamma. Dwaram Anantha Venkata Swamy, a Civil Engineer working in Visakhapatnam Steel Plant, is her brother. Dr.Dwaram Tyagaraj, her brother is also a established singer.
