= Prem Lata Sharma =

Indian musicologist

Prem Lata Sharma (10 May 1927 – 5 December 1998) was an Indian musicologist.

== Life ==
Prem Lata Sharma was born on 10 May 1927, in Nakodar, District Jalandhar, East Panjab. She was the only child of her parents, Pandita Lalchand sharma, Srimati, Mayadevi. Both of them were devoted Gauḍīya Vaiṣṇavas and they brought up their only child, Premlata, in a serene and pious atmosphere. She received her primary and secondary training at home in Delhi along with training in vocal music and sitar. She passed her High School Examination from Panjab University in 1938 at the age of eleven. For the next two years she studied at the University of Delhi in 1940. Then she joined the Indraprastha Girls' college for two years and graduated from Delhi University in 1942.

After this, she spent seven years studying religious literature, especially that of the Gauḍīya Vaiṣṇavas in Bengali and Samkrta, in which her father was also deeply interested. He resigned his job in the Railways and made himself free to look after the interest of his daughter in her studies. Vraj Bhūmi was found to be a better place for intensive study of Gauḍīya Vaiṣṇavism and so the family shifted from Delhi to Mathura in 1947. At Mathura, Premlata Sharma studied and became proficient in three important languages – Braj Bhāṣā, Avadhi and Maithili which were all assets for her later academic studies. She also continued her higher studies in Samskrta and Hindi Literature, while taking regular training in Music which had been a hobby with her since her childhood. This enabled her to pass the Inter Examination in Vocal Music of the Academy of Hindustani Music, Lucknow in 1949.

Considering the aptitude, qualities and potentialities of his daughter, Pandita Lalchand Sharma decided that she should continue her higher studies at Banaras Hindu University (BHU), where a College of Music and Fine Arts had started functioning in 1949–50 with Pandita Omkar Nath Thakur as its Principal. Premlata Sharma was admitted to this college in the first batch of students. She was also admitted to the Women's College Hostel. Pandita Omkarnatha Thakur who knew Pandita Lalchand Sharma very well, agreed to be her local guardian.

Soon after coming to the university she got herself admitted as a casual student in the Central Hindu College and started attending the M. A. classes in Hindi. She had already completed the course and was going to appear in the University Examinations as a private candidate in Arts subjects. So she appeared in the M.A. Hindi Examination in March 1950 and passed the same. In July 1950, she joined the M.A. Classes in Samskrta as a casual student and obtained the M.A. (Samskrta) degree in March 1951.

In July 1951, she got herself registered as a PhD student in Samskrta under Dr. P.L. Vaidya who was then the Head of the Department of Samskrta in the Central Hindu College at the BHU. The subject of her research was: Special study of Rasashastra and Gaudeeya Vaishanava Darshana. For her thesis on "Studies in Bhakti Rasa based on śrī Rūpa Gōsvāmi' she was awarded the PhD degree in 1954.

She passed the Shastracarya degree examinations in Sahitya in 1955; the Saṅgītalaṅkāra examination in Vocal Music in 1955.

She also learnt Marathi, Gujarati and some other languages during this period. She could read, write and speak fluently in Hindi, Samskrta, English, Bengali, Gujarati, Braja Bhāṣā and Avadhi. Panjabi was her mother tongue. She knew a little of Oriyā, Asāmi and Telugu too.

She had also attended classes in the Samskrta Mahavidyalaya of the BHU and in the traditional method studied 'Samskrta Poetics' from Pandita Mahadeva Sastri and Darśana from Pandita Ramachandra Dikshitar.

She acquainted herself with various other aspects of Darsana from Pandita Gopinatha Kaviraj and Pandita Brahmadatta Jijñāsu.

She also studied the Samskṛta texts on Music with Pandita Omkarnatha Thakur.

Her professional career commenced in August 1955 when she was appointed as a lecturer in the College of Music and Fine Arts in BHU and she taught the Theory of Music for the undergraduate and Post graduate students.

Professor Alain Danielou was head of the Research Section, the third wing of the college along with the Vocal and Instrumental section. And when he left, Dr Sharma was given charge of the section and she became its head as part of the Reader's post to which she was appointed in 1957. In 1966, a separate department of musicology was created and she became its head and the Research Section became a part of it. In 1981, she was appointed as a professor of the department of Musicology.

In 1985, she went on deputation from BHU to serve as the Vice-Chancellor of the Indira Kala Sangita Vishvavidyalaya, Khairagarh and served there until 1988. Meanwhile, at the age of 60 years, she retired from the services of the BHU on 31 May 1987.

In her academic career she initiated serious studies in the textual tradition of Indian Music, especially of Samskrta texts. She also emphasized the study of primary sources for research. The courses that were introduced by her since 1957 were PhD, M Phil. and Master of Musicology. A Diploma course in Music Appreciation attracted students from other disciplines.

She supervised the research work of many a doctoral students. Many senior International scholars sought her guidance for their research studies on Indian music. Apart from the various universities and institutions in the country, academic presentations took her to other countries like USA, The Netherlands and Russia.

Her study of Bharata's Nāṭyaśāstra inspired her to initially reconstruct the Pūrvaraṅga, the preliminary part preceding the main drama. Later this was part of the three Samskrta dramas she directed, namely, Vikramōrvaśīyam and Mālavikāgnimitram of Kālidāsa and Uttararāmacaritam of Bhavabhūti. For her creations in this area, she founded an institution named 'Abhinaya Bhāratī' and a trust 'Bharata Nidhi' for promoting the performing arts.

She was associated with the documentation and revival of many performing arts like the Kūṭiyāṭṭam, and Dhrupada. She was an editor of the 'Dhrupada Annual', brought out by the Vidya Mandir Trust of the Maharaja of Banaras.

She also served as the vice-chairman of the Sangeet Natak Akademi, New Delhi and also an academic advisor to the Indira Gandhi National Centre for the Arts, New Delhi, and the Sangeet Research Academy, Kalkatta.

For the Sangeet Natak Akademi she organised three seminars, Śārṅgadēva and his Saṅgītaratnākara', 'Matanga and his work Bṛhaddēśī' and 'Rasa in the Arts' and the papers presented for the first two have been published in book form.

== Publications ==
Publications: (Links provided wherever free download is available.)

Rasavilāsa (a late work on Samskṛta Poetics), 1952

Saṅgītarāja of Mahārāṇa Kumbha, vol.I, ed. by Dr. Premlata Sharma, pub. by Hindu Vishvavidyalaya Sanskrit Publication Board, Banaras Hindu University, Varanasi, 1963.

http://musicresearchlibrary.net/omeka/items/show/2046

http://musicresearchlibrary.net/omeka/items/show/2047

http://musicresearchlibrary.net/omeka/items/show/2048

Saṅgītarāja- Vādyaratnakōśa‚ of Rāṇā Kumbha edited by Dr. Premlata Sharma, printed and unpublished.

http://musicresearchlibrary.net/omeka/items/show/825

Saṅgītarāja- Rasaratnakōśa‚ of Rāṇā Kumbha edited. by Dr. Premlata Sharma, printed and unpublished.

http://musicresearchlibrary.net/omeka/items/show/824

Sahasarasa, Nāyaka Bakṣū kē Dhrupadōn kā Saṅgraha, Transliterated and Edited by Premlata Sharma, Sangeet Natak Akademi, New Delhi, 1972

http://musicresearchlibrary.net/omeka/items/show/3301

Ēkalinġamāhātmya – (a pauraṇika genealogy of the Mevara dynasty), 1976

Bṛhaddēśī of Mataṅgamuni, edited by Prem Lata Sharma, assisted by Anil Behari Beohar, Kalamula Sastra Series, Indira Gandhi National Centre for the Arts and Motilal Banarsidass, New Delhi.

Vol.I Kalamulasastra Series no.8 1992

Vol.II Kalamulasastra Series no.10, 1994

Saṅgītaratnākara of Śārṅgadēva, Vol.I, Chapter I - translated in English by Dr. R.K.Shringy and Dr. Prem Lata Sharma pub. by Motilal Banarsidass, Delhi, 1978.

Saṅgītaratnākara of Śārṅgadēva, Vol.II, Chapters II-IV - Sanskrit Text and English Translation with comments and Notes, English Translation by Dr. R.K.Shringy under the supervision of Dr. Prem Lata Sharma pub. by Munshiram Manoharlal Publishers Pvt. Ltd., Delhi, 1989.

Japasūtram, from Bengali to Hindi, vol. 1 (1966) & 2 (1992).

Rasa Siddhānta, National Publishing House, New Delhi, 110002

http://musicresearchlibrary.net/omeka/items/show/3298

Edited works (Links provided wherever free download is available.)
Nāda Rūpa (Journal) vol. 1, edited by Prem Lata Sharma, College of Music and Fine Arts, Banaras Hindu University, Varanasi, 1961.

http://musicresearchlibrary.net/omeka/items/show/1652

Nāda Rūpa (Journal) vol. 2, Chief Editor: B R Deodhar, (Prem Lata Sharma, Member Editorial Board), College of Music and Fine Arts, Banaras Hindu University, Varanasi, 1963.

http://musicresearchlibrary.net/omeka/items/show/1652

Citrakāvyakautukam

Bhāratīya Saṅgīta kā Itihāsa, of Ṭhakur Jaideva Singh edited by Premlata Sharma, Sangeet Research Academy, Kalkatta, 1994

Thirty Songs from The Panjab and Kāshmīr, of Ratan Devī and Ananda K Coomaraswamy edited by Prem Lata Sharma, Indira Gandhi National Centre For the Arts, Sterling Publishers Private Limited, New Delhi, 1994

Indian Music, of Ṭhakur Jaideva Singh and edited by. Premlata Sharma, Sangeet Research Academy, Kalkatta, 1995

Nāṭya Kalpadruma, 1998

'Śārṅgadēva and His Saṅgītaratnākara: Proceedings of the Seminar Varanasi, 1994' edited by, Prem Lata Sharma, Sangeet Nataka Akademi, Delhi, 1998.

Mataṅga and his work Bṛhaddēśī, Proceedings of the Seminar at Hampi, 1995, edited by, Prem Lata Sharma, Sangeet Natak Akademi, Delhi, 2001.

Indian Music Journal

http://musicresearchlibrary.net/omeka/items/show/2106

Dhrupad Annual (Journal)

http://musicresearchlibrary.net/omeka/items/show/2105

List of articles by Prof. Prem Lata Sharma in the publication - Indian Aesthetics and Musicology (The Art and Science of Indian Music), Volume 1, Compiled articles of Prof. (Miss) Premlata Sharma, Edited by Dr. km. Urmila Sharma, Āmnāya-Prakāśana, Bharata-Nidhi, Varanasi, 2000 http://musicresearchlibrary.net/omeka/items/show/3305
01	European Aesthetics of Music and traditional Indian Saṅgīta Śāstra
02	Unique and unrivalled characteristics of the Art and Science of Indian Music
03	Levels of Aesthetic Experience in Music
04	Rasa Theory and Indian Music
05	The Ancient Grṃa system and its distortion in the medieval times
06	The Concept of Sthāya in Indian Saṅgīta Śāstra (Part 1) (Part 2) - A Glossary of Sthāyas
07	Prabandhas or Compositional Patterns of Hindustani Music
08	Gāndharva
09	History and origin of Ṭhumarī with special reference to Gharānās and styles
10	The Ṭhumarī
11	Gamaka: A study (on the textual and performance traditions in Vocal Music – Hindustani and Karnatak)
12	Traditional view of Drama (Music and dance as an integral part thereof)
13- 14	Śāstra and Prayoga: Contemporary Tāla practice vis-à-vis Śāstic Tradition; with special reference to Hindustani Music Part -1 Part -2
15	Bṛhaddēśī of Mataṅga
16	Śrīkaṇṭha's Rasakaumudī
17	Rasakaumudī of Śrīkaṇṭha
18	Mānasōllāsa or Abhilaṣitārtha Cintāmaṇi
19	Nānyadēva's Bharata Bhāṣya
20	Rāga Kalpadruma
21	Sahasarasa of Nayaka Bakhshoo
22	North-South distinction: A Survey
23	Bridging the Gulf
24	Indian Teachers in Rochester
25	The Music Teacher
26	Musical Instruments (Indian approach)
27	Musical Crativity: Its affinity with other Arts and its uniqueness.

	Research Papers and Articles of Prem Lata Sharma (Links provided wherever free download is available)
01	Ākāśa and Sound: With Special Reference to Music, published in the book "Concepts of Space: Ancient and Modern', Indira Gandhi National Centre For the Arts & Abhinav Publications, http://musicresearchlibrary.net/omeka/items/show/2127
02	Review of Available Music Literature of University Level and Future Requirements, Paper presented at a Seminar on 'Music Education in India at the University Level' held at the Faculty or Performing Arts, Banaras Hindu University, Varanasi. http://musicresearchlibrary.net/omeka/items/show/2085
03	A Historical Note on Music Research in India, paper presented at a seminar on 'Curriculum Development and Design for Evalation of Post-Graduate Studies in Music" at the College of Indian Music, Dance & Dramatics, Vadodara, held from 31 October to 2 November 1977 http://musicresearchlibrary.net/omeka/items/show/2162
04	Paramparā in Indian Music with Special Reference to Pt. Omkarnath Thakur in Hindustani Music – paper presented at a seminar. http://musicresearchlibrary.net/omeka/items/show/2533
05	Parallel Concepts in Sanskrit Poetics and Saṅgītaśāstra – a paper presented at as seminar. http://musicresearchlibrary.net/omeka/items/show/2126
06	History and Origin of Ṭhumarī with special reference to Gharānā and Styles – an article published Prajñā, Journal of the Banaras Hindu University, March 1963. http://musicresearchlibrary.net/omeka/items/show/2128
07	harmonium aur light classical music (Hindi) – a paper presented at a Seminar on Harmonium held at the All India Radio, Delhi. http://musicresearchlibrary.net/omeka/items/show/2125
08	svatantra bhārata mēṃ sāṃskrtika punarjāgaraṇa - saṅgīta kē kṣētra mēṃ (Hindi) - paper presented at seminar. http://musicresearchlibrary.net/omeka/items/show/2146
09	rāga-rāgiṇī citraṇa paramparā (Hindi)– article published in Nāda Rūpa Research Journal of the College of Music & Fine Arts, Banaras Hindu University, Varanasi. January 1963. http://musicresearchlibrary.net/omeka/items/show/2147
10	saṅgīta mēṃ nibaddha aur anibaddha (Hindi) – article published in ? http://musicresearchlibrary.net/omeka/items/show/2150
11	Key Note Address (Hindi) delivered at the Ninth Akhila Bhāratīya Saṅgīta Śikṣaka Sammēlana conducted by the Akhila Bhāratīya Gāndharva Mahāvidyālaya Maṇḍala, 1976. http://musicresearchlibrary.net/omeka/items/show/2148
12	prabandha kā śāstrīya adhyayana: ēka saṅkṣipta digdarśana, published in the book 'Bhāvaraṅga Lahari' Pt. 1 of Balwantarai Bhatta, Varanasi, 1964.

Books and Articles on Prem Lata Sharma
Vividha Viṣaya Viduṣī Dr. Prem Lata Sharma: Vyaktitva ēvaṃ kṛtitva (Hindi), by Archana Dixit. Author publisher, Varanasi, 2002.

Scholar, Teacher, Colleague, Friend, May 1999 by Harold S Powers

http://musicresearchlibrary.net/omeka/items/show/2220

Prem Lata Sharma: A Great Scholar and Activist, by N Ramanathan

http://musicresearchlibrary.net/omeka/items/show/2357
