= A. Ramana Rao =

Indian volleyball player (born 1945)

Arikapudi Ramana Rao (born 1 July 1945) is a former Indian volleyball player. He was born in Chamallamudi village, Guntur district, Andhra Pradesh. He is a recipient of both the Arjuna Award for the year 1977–1978 and Dronacharya Award for the year 1990–1991.

Ramana Rao started playing volleyball after joining college. He graduated from Hindu College, Guntur in 1966. From the year 1966 to 1976 he participated in the National Volleyball Championships and Captained the Tamil Nadu State team consecutively for four years. He played for the Tamil Nadu State team which won the National Volleyball Championship title for the first time at Tiruchirapalli in 1976.

He was the head coach for the Indian men's volleyball team at the Asian Men's Volleyball Championship at Perth in 1991. He was also the first Indian volleyball coach to qualify as FIVB Instructor in the German Democratic Republic in 1986 and went on to conduct the International Coaches Courses in India and abroad. He was nominated as a Member AVC Coaches Committee of the Asian Volleyball Confideration (AVC) from 1993 to 1997.

Ramana Rao was nominated as the Director of the FIVB Regional Development Centre, in Chennai, India. Currently he is the President of Andhra Pradesh Volleyball Association. He is the chairman, Coaching Committee, Volleyball Federation of India.
