= Venkata Parvatiswara Kavulu =

Venkata Parvatiswara Kavulu was a prominent Telugu poet-duo consisting of Balantrapu Venkata Rao (1882–1955) and Voleti Parvatisam (1880–1970). Bhava Kusumavali Brundavanam and an unfinished Ramayanam established their reputation as poets honored with the title Kaviraja Hamsalu (swans of the poets).
