= Sobha Naidu =

Indian Kuchipudi dancer (1956–2020)

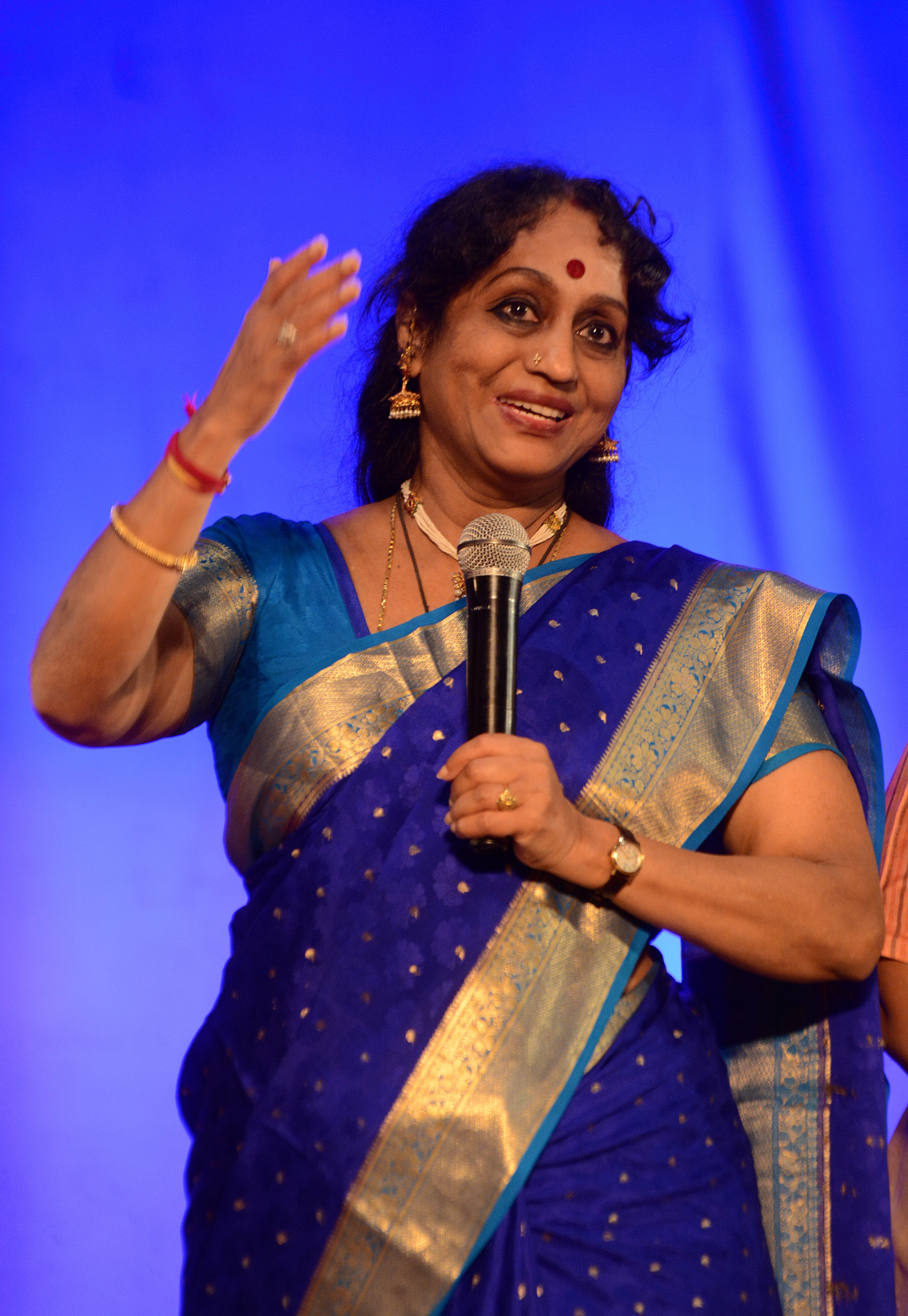
- Born: 1956; Anakapalle, Andhra Pradesh, India
- Died: 14 October 2020 (aged 63–64); Hyderabad, Telangana, India
- Occupation: Classical dancer
- Known for: Kuchipudi
- Awards: Padma Shri (2001), Sangeet Natak Akademi Award (1991)
- Website: sobhanaidu.org

Sobha Naidu (1956 – 14 October 2020) was an Indian Kuchipudi dancer, teacher, and choreographer. A disciple of the celebrated Kuchipudi maestro Vempati Chinna Satyam, she became one of the foremost practitioners of the classical dance form. Popular for her role as Satyabhama in cultural dance dramas, she was the principal of the Srinivasa Kuchipudi Art Academy in Hyderabad. Over the course of her career, Sobha Naidu trained thousands of students and choreographed numerous dance-dramas. In recognition of her significant contributions to classical dance, Sobha Naidu was awarded the Padma Shri by the Government of India in 2001 and the Sangeet Natak Akademi Award in 1991.

== Early life ==
Sobha Naidu was born in 1956 in Anakapalle, Andhra Pradesh, India. Her father, K. V. Naidu, initially opposed her pursuit of dance, wanting her to become a doctor. However, her mother, Sarojini Devi, supported her passion for classical dance. Sobha began her dance training under P. L. Reddy in Rajahmundry before advancing under the renowned Kuchipudi guru Vempati Chinna Satyam in Madras (now Chennai). She later earned a degree from Queen Mary's College in Chennai.

== Career ==
Dance performance by Elena Tarasova, choreographed by Sobha Naidu, in Saint Petersburg, 2009

Sobha Naidu quickly gained recognition as an exceptional student under Vempati Chinna Satyam, and her debut performance (arangetram) marked the beginning of a successful career. Despite initial hesitation from her father, the success of her arangetram led her to continue performing after returning to Hyderabad from Chennai. Sobha became known for her portrayal of key characters in Kuchipudi dance, including Satyabhama, Padmavathi, and the protagonist in Rabindranath Tagore's Chandalika. Her performances set a high standard in Kuchipudi, earning her widespread acclaim. Although she received several film offers early in her career, including a blank cheque from producer B. Nagi Reddy, Sobha chose to remain dedicated to classical dance. She also declined offers to learn Bharatanatyam from prominent gurus like Vazhuvoor Ramaiah Pillai, feeling that even a lifetime was not enough to master Kuchipudi.

Sobha's talent was visible from an early age, and she played lead roles in several of her guru's dance-dramas. Her performances were highly regarded both in India and internationally. She represented India at cultural events in countries such as the United States, United Kingdom, USSR, Syria, Turkey, Hong Kong, Iraq, and Cambodia. Additionally, she also led cultural delegations to the West Indies, Mexico, Venezuela, Tunisia, and Cuba on behalf of the Indian government.

She founded the Srinivasa Kuchipudi Art Academy in Hyderabad in 1980 and served as its principal for 40 years, grooming over 1,500 dancers from India and abroad, many of whom have continued her legacy in Kuchipudi. During her tenure, she choreographed over 80 solo performances and 15 ballets.

== Personal life ==
Sobha Naidu was related to the eminent Carnatic violinist Dwaram Venkataswamy Naidu. She died on 14 October 2020 in Hyderabad at the age of 64. Sobha is survived by her husband, Arjun Rao, a retired IAS officer, and her daughter, Sai Sivaranjani.

== Legacy ==
Naidu's contributions to the field of Kuchipudi have left an indelible mark on Indian classical dance. She is remembered for her ability to combine technical precision with expressive storytelling, making her performances highly acclaimed both in India and abroad. Her commitment to training the next generation of dancers ensures that her legacy continues.

== Awards and recognition ==
Throughout her career, Sobha Naidu bagged numerous awards for her contributions to dance:

- Padma Shri (2001)
- Nrutya Choodamani (1982)
- Sangeet Natak Akademi Award (1991)
- Nritya Kala Siromani (1996)
- NTR National Award (1998)
- Hamsa Award from the Government of Andhra Pradesh
