= Ushasri =

Ushasri (16 March 1928 – 7 September 1990) was a radio and literary personality in Telugu. The original name of Ushasri was Puranapanda Surya Prakasha Dikshithulu. He was from Andhra Pradesh in South India.

He was famous for his radio programmes broadcast from the Vijayawada All India Radio station. His voice was easily recognised all across Andhra Pradesh among the 1960-1970s' generation. On radio, in a weekly series, he used to tell the epics of Mahabharata and Bhagavata Purana in a simple and lucid style which was easily understood even by illiterate people.

== Early life ==
Ushasri was born in Kakaraparru Agraharam in West Godavari district, Andhra Pradesh on 16 March 1928. He joined All India Radio in His father Puranapanda Ramamurthy is an ayurveda doctor and his mother was Kasi Annapurna. He married Satyavathi and they had four daughters.

== Career ==
In 1973, he started his weekly Sunday afternoon commentary on Ramayana and Mahabharatha.

The live commentary which he used to give for Sita Rama Kalyanam at Bhadrachalam was equally popular. He also wrote a number of books on Hindu epics. Even now, his voice is imitated by mimicry artists in their programmes. His live commentary on the opening of road-cum-rail bridge which was built on the River Godavari between Rajahmundry and Kovvur, was very famous. This bridge was inaugurated by Fakruddin Ali Ahmed, former president of India. In that commentary he was supported by Sankaramanchi Satyam, the author of Amaravathi Kathalu.

He was the first person to write Navala Lekhavali that is series of letters in the form of suggesting young girls. The name of this work is Pellade Bomma. It was continuously published in Krishna Patrika during the 1960s. He wrote for Venkateswara Kalyanam a Yaksha Ganam in 1961. It was performed by Nataraj Ramakrishna. It was also performed in front of Sarvepalli Radhakrishnan, former President of India. At that time, Nataraja Ramakrishna cheated Ushasri, that this Yakshaganam was written by himself, but not by Ushasri. From that day onwards Ushasri had taken his script and not allowed Nataraja Ramakrishna to perform.

He was the first person to give a running commentary on the occasion of Krishna Pushkaras in Vijayawada. It was grand success. So many people came to visit Vijayawada just looking for Ushasri, rather than for Pushkara Snanam. It was told by Sriramana, author of Mithunam story. His voice is incomparable.

Ushasri faced troubles while he was working in the All India Radio, Hyderabad station. There he suffered from colleagues. The well-known poet Devulapalli Krishna Sastri wanted Ushasri to be removed from All India Radio. "If ushasri is in AIR, we should close the station. Immediately remove him from the job." Balantrapu Rajanikantharao, the station director, recognised the greatness of Ushasri and immediately sent him to Vijayawada station.

He translated the speeches of Rajaji and gave a running commentary on the visit of Lal Bahadur Sastri to Hyderabad. While he was young, he was blessed by Sridhara Venkaiah, who is famous in astronomy. He said that Ushasri would be popular by his voice. ("You will live with your mouth").

== Family ==
Ushasri's wife is Madhunapantula Vyasa Venkata Satyavati, who is the cousin of Madhunapantula Satyanarayana Sastry, residents of Pallepalem, near Yanam. Ushasri has four daughters. Dr. Gayatri, who is a professional ayurvedic doctor, giving programmes in Etv, SVBC. Padmavathi who is working as a teacher for 25 years, in Vijayawada. Jayanthi, who did her Ph.D. on Ushasri's works, is a sub-editor in Sakshi Telugu Daily newspaper. Kalyani is in charge of the auditing section in a hospital. Ushasri faced so many difficulties, and struggled a lot in the beginning of his career. He also wrote a famous story, Athidhi Maryadha, which is a lesson for seventh class children in Telugu state and CBSE text book.

== Books written by Ushasri ==
- Ushasri Bharatham
- Ushasri Ramayanam
- Ushasri Sundarakanda
- Ushasri Bhagavat Gita
- Ushasri Bhagavatam
- Amruta kalasam
- Malle Pandiri
- Venkateswara Kalyanam
- Raaga Hrudayam
- Pellade Bommaa
- Santaptulu
- Preyasi-priyam Vada

== See also ==
- Aaraama Dravidulu
