= Dwaram Bhavanarayana Rao =

- Born: 15 June 1924; Bapatla
- Died: 24 July 2000 (aged 76) Visakhapatnam
- Genres: Carnatic music
- Occupation: Violinist
- Instrument: Violin

Dwaram Bhavanarayana Rao (15 June 1924 – 24 July 2000) was a famous Indian violinist and son of legendary Padmasri Dwaram Venkataswamy Naidu.

He was born to Dwaram Venkataswamy Naidu and Venkata Jaggayyamma on 15 June 1924 at Bapatla and married Gummuluri Varadamma. He was educated in Chennai and trained by his father and the late Prof. P. Sambamurthy.

He worked as principal of Maharajah's Government College of Music and Dance at Vizianagaram from 1962 to 1973. He also worked as principal of Government Music College at Vijayawada.

He translated the Brihaddeshi of Matanga Muni, Chaturdandi Prakasika of Pandit Venkatamakhi and Dattilam of Dattila Muni into the Telugu language and published it. He also translated some of the music theory books but these are unpublished.

He died of cardiac arrest at his residence in Visakhapatnam on 24 July 2000 at the age of 76 years, being survived by his wife, three sons and two daughters.

== Honours ==
He was the recipient of Andhra Pradesh Sangita Nataka Academy award and Sangita Kalaprapoorna award from Andhra University.

He was a member of the advisory board of the Madras Music Academy.
