= Dwaram Venkataswamy Naidu =

Carnatic violinist (1893–1964)

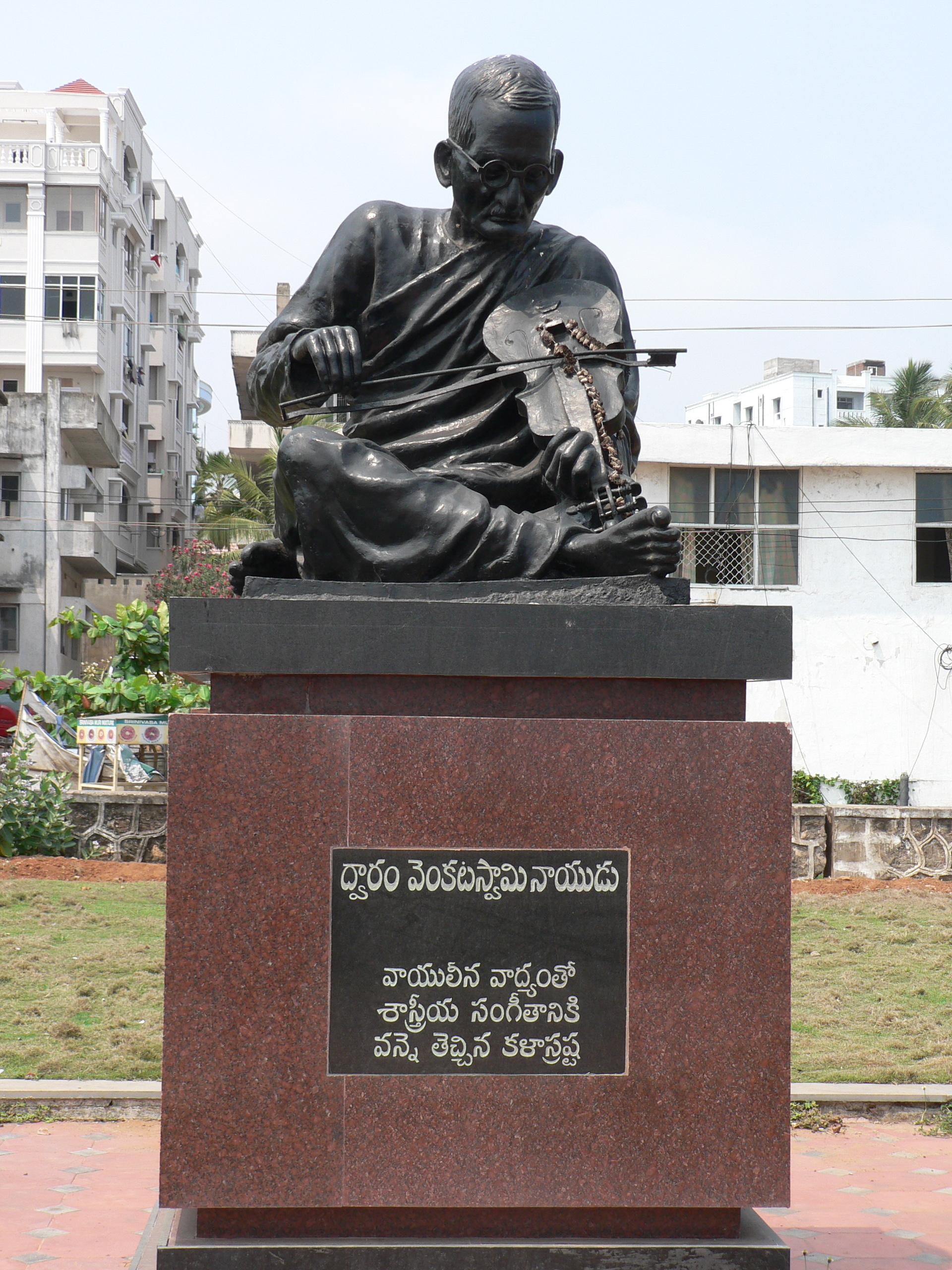
- Dwaram Venkataswamy Naidu statue at RK Beach, Visakhapatnam

Background information
- Born: 8 November 1893; Bangalore, India
- Origin: Andhra Pradesh, India
- Died: 25 November 1964 (aged 71)
- Genre: Carnatic Classical Music
- Occupation: Violinist
- Instrument: Violin

Dwaram Venkataswamy Naidu (8 November 1893 – 25 November 1964) was an Indian violinist in the Carnatic classical tradition. Known for his refined bowing technique and expressive playing, Naidu was one of the most celebrated violinists of the 20th century in Carnatic music. He was the recipient of several awards, including the Sangeet Natak Akademi Award in 1953 and the Padma Shri in 1957. Despite being partially blind, Naidu achieved international recognition and influenced many students and musicians during his career. Several members of his family are also notable Carnatic violinists.

== Early life ==
Dwaram Venkataswamy Naidu was born on November 8, 1893, in Bangalore, on Deepavali, to Venkata Rayudu, a commissioned officer in the army. His family had a military background, and both his grandfather and father played the violin as a hobby. Following his father's retirement, the family settled in their native village, Kasimkota, near Anakapalli. As a child, Naidu showed an early interest in music, experimenting with his elder brother Venkata Krishnayya's violin. Due to impaired vision, Naidu was unable to continue schooling, and at the age of six, he began formal violin training under his brother. He later studied under the guidance of Sangameswara Sastry.

== Career ==
At the age of 25, Naidu was appointed as a professor of violin at Maharaja's Music College in Vizianagaram in 1919, after impressing the college management during his admission test as a student. In 1936, he succeeded Adibhatla as the principal of the college.

Naidu is known for popularizing the violin as a solo instrument in Carnatic music. His first solo concert was in Vellore in 1938. He developed a distinct playing style that combined soft bowing with precise finger techniques.

He was one of the leading Carnatic music violinists of his era, alongside contemporaries like Kumbakonam Rajamanickam Pillai, T. Chowdiah, and Papa Venkataramaiah. Yehudi Menuhin, an internationally renowned violinist, was greatly impressed by Naidu’s performance in India. Naidu was also a teacher to prominent musicians like playback singer Ghantasala and violinist T. M. Patnaik.

In 1952, Naidu performed at the National Physical Laboratory in New Delhi to raise funds for the Blind Relief Association.

== Awards and honours ==
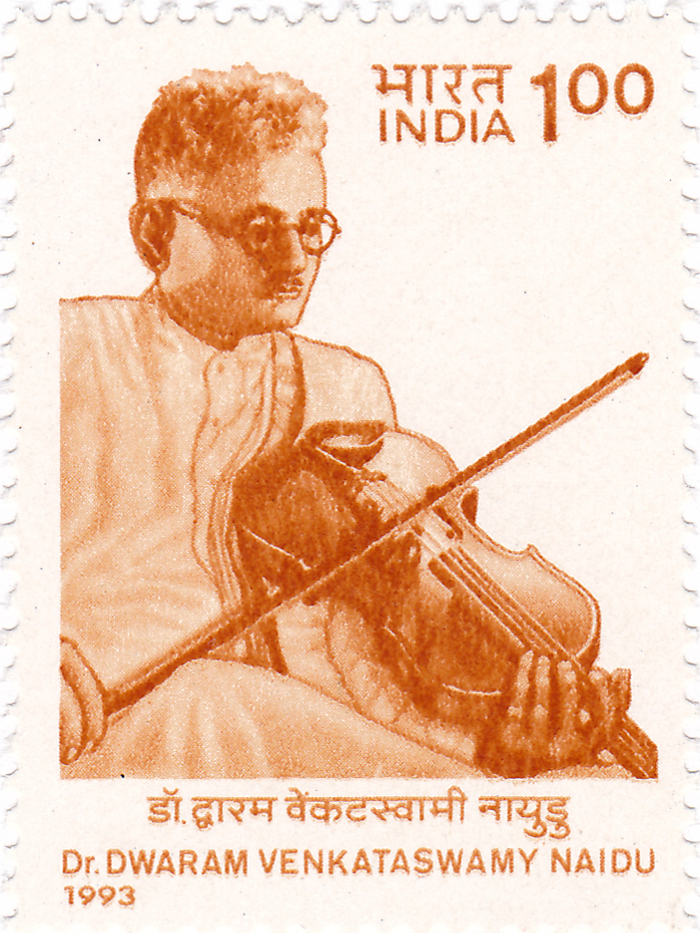
Naidu on a 1993 stamp of India

- In 1941, Naidu was awarded the Sangeetha Kalanidhi title by the Madras Music Academy.
- He received the Sangeetha Kalasikhamani from the Indian Fine Arts Society in 1941.
- Andhra University conferred upon him the title of Kala Prapoorna in 1950.
- In 1953, he received the Sangeet Natak Akademi Award for Fine Arts.
- The Padma Shri Award was conferred upon him in 1957.
- In 1993, the India Post issued a commemorative stamp in his honour.
- The Raja-Lakshmi Award for 1992 was awarded to the Dwaram Venkataswamy Naidu Memorial Trust by the Sri Raja-Lakshmi Foundation.

Statues of Naidu have been erected in Visakhapatnam and Chennai in recognition of his contributions to Indian classical music.

== Family ==
Dwaram Venkataswamy Naidu was married to Venkata Jaggayyamma. Their daughter, Dwaram Mangatayaru, was also a violinist, known for her violin duets with her father. Their son, Dwaram Bhavanarayana Rao, was a noted musicologist. His grandson, Dwaram Durga Prasad Rao, is a Carnatic violinist and recipient of the Sangeet Natak Akademi Award in 2014. Another of Naidu’s granddaughters, Dwaram Lakshmi, is a vocalist and currently serves as a professor at Padmavathi Mahila University. Justice Meenakumari, also his granddaughter, served as the Chief Justice of the Meghalaya High Court.

Renowned Kuchipudi dancer Sobha Naidu is a relative of Dwaram Venkataswamy Naidu.
