= Chanchal Kumar Majumdar =

Indian physicist (1938–2000)

- Majumdar giving a lecture
- Born: 11 August 1938; Calcutta, Bengal, British India
- Died: 20 June 2000 (aged 61); Kolkata, West Bengal, India
- Education: CMS St. John's High School, Krishnanagar; Presidency College; Rajabazar Science College; University of Calcutta; University of California, San Diego; Carnegie Mellon University; University of Manchester
- Known for: Majumdar–Ghosh model; Kohn-Majumdar theorem
- Awards: 1976 Shanti Swarup Bhatnagar Prize; 1978 Asiatic Society M. N. Saha Medal; 1979 IPA P. A. Pandya Award; 1983 UGC M. N. Saha Award; 1989 INSA S. N. Bose Medal; 1997 ISCA Satyendranath Bose Birth Centenary Award
- Scientific career
- Fields: Condensed matter physics
- Workplaces: Tata Institute of Fundamental Research; University of Calcutta; IACS; S.N. Bose National Centre; Indian Statistical Institute
- Doctoral advisor: Walter Kohn; Maria Goeppert-Mayer
- Doctoral students: Dipan Ghosh

Chanchal Kumar Majumdar (Bengali: [Cañcāla kumāra majumadāra]) (11 August 1938 – 20 June 2000) was an Indian condensed matter physicist and the founder director of S.N. Bose National Centre for Basic Sciences. Known for his research in quantum mechanics, Majumdar was an elected fellow of all the three major Indian science academies – the Indian National Science Academy, the National Academy of Sciences, India, and the Indian Academy of Sciences – as well a member of the New York Academy of Sciences and the American Physical Society.

Majumdar was the mentor of Dipan Ghosh with whom he co-developed the Majumdar–Ghosh model, an extension of the Heisenberg model which improved upon the latter, and was a protege of Walter Kohn and Maria Goeppert-Mayer, both Nobel laureates. The Council of Scientific and Industrial Research, the apex agency of the Government of India for scientific research, awarded him the Shanti Swarup Bhatnagar Prize for Science and Technology, one of the highest Indian science awards, for his contributions to Physical Sciences in 1976.

== Biography ==
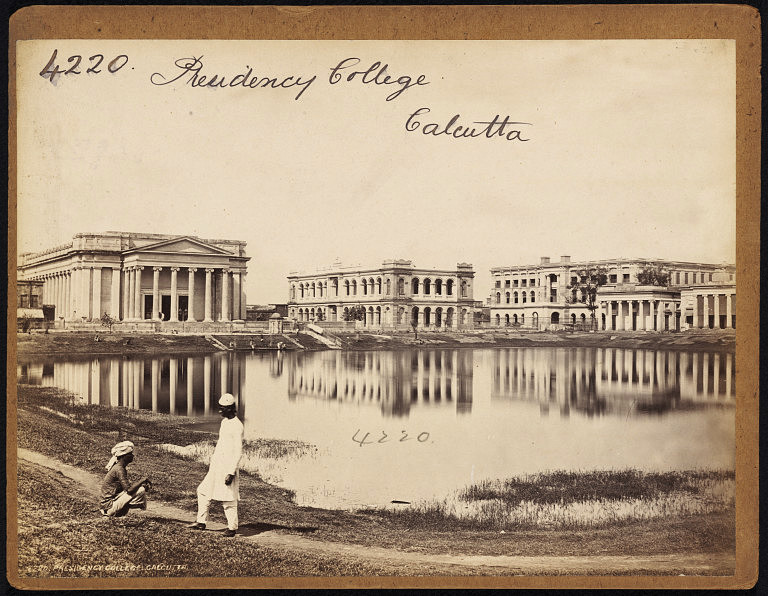
Presidency College, a Francis Frith image

C. K. Majumdar was born on 11 August 1938 in Calcutta in the Bengal Presidency of British India to Sita and Nirmal Kanti Majumdar, a political science professor, as one of their three sons. He and his brothers, Ujjal and Mukul, did well in their studies. He did his schooling at C.M.S St. John's High School in Krishnanagar and completed his early college education in Calcutta at Presidency College and the Rajabazar Science College, University of Calcutta.

After undertaking postgraduate research at the Saha Institute of Nuclear Physics during 1960–61, he enrolled at the University of California, San Diego and worked at the laboratory of Walter Kohn, who would go on to receive a Nobel Prize in Chemistry in 1998; Kohn was his thesis supervisor and their relationship lasted Majumdar's lifetime. Majumdar's research on the effect of interactions on positron annihilation in solids guided by Maria Goeppert-Mayer, who had won the Nobel Prize for Physics in 1963, earned him a PhD in 1965, and he did his post-doctoral work at Carnegie Mellon University (then known as Carnegie Institute of Technology) while continuing his work with Kohn for a while.

On his return to India in 1966, Majumdar joined the Tata Institute of Fundamental Research as an associate professor, where he stayed until his move to University of Calcutta in 1975. In between, he had a short stint at the University of Manchester in 1969–70, working alongside Sam Edwards.

At Calcutta University, Majumdar served as the Palit Professor of Physics at the University College of Science, Technology & Agriculture, and as the head of the department of magnetism and solid state physics of the Indian Association for the Cultivation of Science (IACS), carrying out his research at the Palit Laboratory of IACS and at the Variable Energy Cyclotron Centre. When the Department of Science and Technology established the S.N. Bose National Centre for Basic Sciences (SNBNCBS), an autonomous institute for basic research in mathematics, Majumdar was appointed as its first director in 1987. Following a decade of service at SNBNCBS, he retired from official service in 1999.

After retirement from regular service, Majumdar served as a senior scientist of the Indian National Science Academy at the Indian Statistical Institute, but his stint there was short-lived. He succumbed to a heart attack on 20 June 2000 in Kolkata, aged 61. He was survived by his wife, Utpala Ghosh, whom he had married soon after his return from the US in 1968, and their two children, Ruchira and Rupak.

== Legacy ==
An electrostatic analogue for a magnetic moment - Majumdar developed methods for measuring magnetic moments

A major turning point in Majumdar's career came during his doctoral work with Walter Kohn in the early 1960s. The Austrian-born American scientist had already been known in the scientific world for his development of the Luttinger–Kohn model (he would later win the 1998 Nobel Prize for chemistry), and his association with Majumdar resulted in the development of the Kohn-Majumdar theorem, which explained the continuity in a Fermi gas in relation to its bound and unbound states. They described the theorem in an article, Continuity between Bound and Unbound States in a Fermi Gas, published in Physical Review in 1965.

Later, during his days at TIFR, Majumdar guided Dipan Ghosh on Magnetic Hamiltonians for the latter's doctoral studies. Together they developed the Majumdar–Ghosh model, an extension of the Heisenberg model, which serves as a stepping stone to a broader understanding of complex spin models. The model is detailed in their article On Next-Nearest-Neighbor Interaction in Linear Chain, I, published in the Journal of Mathematical Physics in 1969. A year later, Majumdar worked on non-Debye stress relaxation of glassy systems along with Samuel Edwards, which also resulted in the publication of a notable article. Subsequently, he developed methods for calculating effective magnetic moment and physical quantities such as specific heat of finite Heisenberg chains; his work proved that violation of the rules related to non-degeneracy and avoided crossing existed.

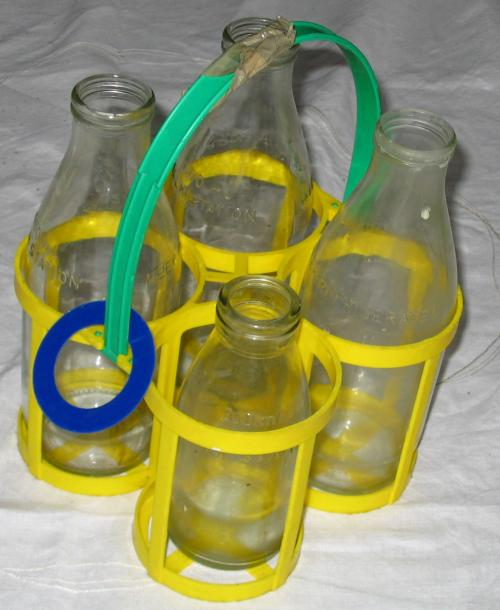
Soda lime glass bottles

Majumdar used scattering theory techniques to study bound magnon states, and his findings have since been experimentally verified. He modified the work of Michael R. Douglas and Sam Edwards on soda-lime glass and proposed a simpler explanation for its time-dependent stress relaxation and a formula to assess long time scales with regard to its order of magnitude. Some of his other achievements include the calculation of critical isotherm of Lennard-Jones gas, the Mössbauer effect determination of the Fe(II) and Fe(III) ratio, the determination of critical parameters of gas-liquid phase transition, the Ising model of ferromagnetism, and the development of a theoretical method for measuring the Fermi momentum of metals.

His studies have been documented by way of a number of articles (Note: Please see Selected bibliography section) and the article repository of the Indian Academy of Sciences has listed 45 of them. Majumdar also published two books, Annihilation of Positrons in Metals and S N Bose: The Man and His Work, and contributed chapters to books published by others.

On the academic front, Majumdar was instrumental in modernising the physics laboratories at Calcutta University. He was associated with a number of national and international agencies; he was a member of the Indian National Commission for Cooperation with UNESCO and the Indo-US Subcommission in Physics. He sat on the Physics panel of the University Grants Commission as well as the commission on higher education in West Bengal. He served as a member of the advisory committees on Physics of the Department of Science and Technology and the Council of Scientific and Industrial Research. He was the editor of the Indian Journal of Physics and was a member of the editorial board of the Pramana journal. He was associated with the conference on Observational Evidence for Black Holes in the Universe held in Kolkata in 1998 as a member of its scientific advisory committee. He was the president of the Indian Physical Society (1988–90) and the Indian Centre for Space Physics (1999–2000), and served as an executive council member of the Raman Centre for Applied and Interdisciplinary Sciences.

== Controversy ==
Towards the end of his career at S. N. Bose Centre, he faced allegations of misappropriation of funds. His mentor, Walter Kohn, later argued that the allegations stemmed from Majumdar's troubled relationship with trade unions under the influence of the Communist Party of India when the state was run by a Left Front government led by Jyoti Basu.

== Awards and honours ==
The Council of Scientific and Industrial Research awarded Majumdar the Shanti Swarup Bhatnagar Prize, one of the highest Indian science awards, in 1976. The same year, he was elected a Fellow of the Indian Academy of Sciences. He received the M. N. Saha Medal of the Asiatic Society in 1978 and was selected as a National Lecturer by University Grants Commission (UGC) the same year; the P. A. Pandya Award of the Indian Physics Association reached him a year later. In 1982, the Indian National Science Academy (INSA) elected him as a Fellow, and in 1983 the UGC honoured him again with the Meghnad Saha Award for Research in Theoretical Sciences. He received another honour from INSA by way of the Satyendranath Bose Medal in 1989. He became an elected fellow of the American Physical Society and delivered the Santanu Ghosh Memorial Lecture of the Indian Science News Association, Calcutta, both honours coming in 1991. The Indian Science Congress Association awarded him the Satyendranath Bose Birth Centenary Award in 1997. He was also a fellow of the National Academy of Sciences, India, Indian Physical Society and the New York Academy of Sciences.

The Indian Association for the Cultivation of Science has instituted an annual oration, C. K. Majumdar Memorial Lecture, in his honour; the inaugural lecture was delivered by Walter Kohn. Past speakers of the lecture include notable names such as Michael Berry, David Logan, Peter Littlewood, Narasimhaiengar Mukunda, Jainendra K. Jain, and Daniel I. Khomskii. An issue of Physics Letters B in 2000, the year of his death, was published as a festschrift on him.

To commemorate his 60th birthday, an international conference on statistical physics, Statphys – Calcutta III, was held at S. N. Bose Centre in January 1999. A year after his death, the Indian Statistical Institute organised a Workshop on Strongly Correlated Electron Systems to honour his memory.

== Selected bibliography ==
=== Books ===
- Chanchal Kumar Majumdar (1965). Annihilation of Positrons in Metals. Physics)--University of California, San Diego.
- Chanchal Kumar Majumdar; Santimay Chatterjee; S. N. Bose National Centre for Basic Sciences (1994). S N Bose: The Man and His Work. S N Bose National Centre for Basic Sciences.

=== Chapters ===
- Positron Annihilation Conference (1967). Positron Annihilation. Academic Press.
- Proceedings of the Nuclear Physics and Solid State Physics Symposium. Department of Atomic Energy, Government of India. 1968.
- India. Dept. of Atomic Energy (1968). Proceedings of the Nuclear Physics and Solid State Physics Symposium: Solid state physics.
- R. Pratap; Jitendra C. Parikh (1975). The General Many Body Problem: Proceedings of the Conference Held in Ahmedabad. Hindustan Publishing Corporation (India).
- Bhatnagar Laureates, 1958–91. Human Resource Development Group, Council of Scientific & Industrial Research. 1992.
- Science & Culture. Indian Science News Association. 2000.
- A.T. Steward (2 December 2012). Positron Annihilation: Proceedings of the Conference held at Wayne State University on July 27–29,1965. Elsevier Science. p. 300. ISBN 978-0-323-14982-2.
- Asoke Mitra (2 December 2012). Few body dynamics. Elsevier. p. 386. ISBN 978-0-444-60109-4.

=== Articles ===
- W. Kohn, C. Majumdar (1965). "Continuity between Bound and Unbound States in a Fermi Gas". Physical Review. 138 (6A): A1617–A1620. Bibcode:1965PhRv..138.1617K. doi:10.1103/PhysRev.138.A1617.
- Chanchal K. Majumdar (1966). "Continuity of Bound and Unbound States in a Fermi Gas: A Soluble Example". Journal of Mathematical Physics. 7 (682): 682–690. Bibcode:1966JMP.....7..682M. doi:10.1063/1.1704982.
- Chanchal K. Majumdar, Dipan K. Ghosh (1969). "On Next-Nearest-Neighbor Interaction in Linear Chain. I". Journal of Mathematical Physics. 10 (1388): 1388–1398. Bibcode:1969JMP....10.1388M. doi:10.1063/1.1664978.
- Chanchal K. Majumdar, Dipan K. Ghosh (1969). "On Next-Nearest-Neighbor Interaction in Linear Chain. II". Journal of Mathematical Physics. 10 (1399): 1399–1402. Bibcode:1969JMP....10.1399M. doi:10.1063/1.1664979.
- Chanchal K. Majumdar (1969). "Problem of Two Spin Deviations in a Linear Chain with Next-Nearest-Neighbor Interactions". Journal of Mathematical Physics. 10 (177): 177–180. Bibcode:1969JMP....10..177M. doi:10.1063/1.1664749.
- Chanchal K. Majumdar (1972). "Solution of Faddeev Equations for a One-Dimensional System". Journal of Mathematical Physics. 13 (705): 705–708. Bibcode:1972JMP....13..705M. doi:10.1063/1.1666038.
- Chanchal K. Majumdar, I. Rama Rao (1976). "Critical parameters of a Lennard-Jones gas". Physical Review A. 14 (1542): 1542–1546. Bibcode:1976PhRvA..14.1542M. doi:10.1103/PhysRevA.14.1542.
- S. K. Mukhopadhyay, Chanchal K. Majumdar (1976). "Solutions of the three magnon bound state equation. II". Journal of Mathematical Physics. 17 (478): 478–479. Bibcode:1976JMP....17..478M. doi:10.1063/1.522924.
- Chanchal K. Majumdar, Indrani Bose (1978). "Solutions of the three-magnon bound state equation. III. The physical eigenstate". Journal of Mathematical Physics. 18 (2187): 2187–2192. Bibcode:1978JMP....19.2187M. doi:10.1063/1.523551.
- Chanchal K. Majumdar (1982). "The three magnon bound-state equation in one dimension". Journal of Mathematical Physics. 23 (71): 71–73. Bibcode:1982JMP....23...71M. doi:10.1063/1.525208.

== See also ==
- Fermi gas
- Faddeev equations
- Satyendra Nath Bose
- Indrani Bose
