= Canadian Commission for UNESCO =

The Canadian Commission for UNESCO (CCUNESCO) serves as a bridge between Canadians and the vital work of UNESCO - the United Nations Educational, Scientific and Cultural Organization. Through its networks and partners, CCUNESCO promote's UNESCO's values, priorities and programs in Canada and brings the voices of Canadian experts to the international stage. Its activities are guided by the United Nations' 2030 Agenda for Sustainable Development and other UNESCO priorities. CCUNESCO operates under the Canada Council for the Arts.

UNESCO is the only UN agency to have a system of National Commissions. As part of this international network of National Commissions, the Canadian Commission for UNESCO is in a unique situation to effectively contribute to Canada's positions on UNESCO issues.

== Status and function ==
The Canadian Commission for UNESCO was established by Order in Council on 14 June 1957, in conformity with the Constitution of UNESCO and pursuant to the Canada Council Act. It operates under the general authority of the Canada Council for the Arts, which provides its Secretariat. The Commission's role is to involve government departments and agencies, institutions, organizations and individuals working for the advancement of UNESCO's mandated fields of education, science, culture, communication and information, in its activities.

== Structure ==
The Commission's arm's length relationship to government and its broadly based and diverse membership make it unique among National Commissions. The Commission has an extensive network of members across Canada which includes government and non-governmental organizations, institutions and individual members. Its Executive Committee, which includes representatives from both government and civil society, sets out and approves the general policy and programme directions of the Commission. Through these connections, the Commission coordinates UNESCO programme activities in Canada, consults Canadians and provides advice to the Canadian Government on UNESCO matters.

== UNESCO presence in Canada ==
- In Canada, the UNESCO Schools Network is active in most provinces and territories and includes over 130 schools that support students to learn and reflect on global challenges such as peace, climate action, human rights, cultural diversity, and sustainable development, while contributing to positive change in their communities
- 19 UNESCO Biosphere Reserves work to conserve biodiversity and promote sustainable development by involving local communities
- 22 World Heritage Sites encourage the identification, protection and preservation of cultural and natural heritage considered to be of outstanding value to humanity
- 5 UNESCO Global Geoparks in Canada offer countless opportunities for exploring, learning about, showcasing, and preserving unique natural heritage. They include sites of geological, archeological, wildlife, environmental, historical, folkloric, and cultural interest
- 40 UNESCO Chairs in universities and post-secondary institutions promote international cooperation for exchange of knowledge and information sharing
- 12 archival collections are listed on the International Registry of the Memory of the World administrated by UNESCO and 34 on the Canada Memory of the World Register administrated by CCUNESCO
- 3 post-secondary education institutions, one in Alberta, one in Quebec and one in Ontario, are designated UNESCO-UNEVOC Centres for technical and vocational education and training
- 4 members of the Creative Cities Network, Montreal (Creative City of Design), Quebec City (Creative City of Literature), Toronto (Creative City of Media Arts), and London (Creative City of Music)
- 121 signatory municipalities of the Canadian Coalition of Inclusive Municipalities, are located across Canada, advancing initiatives to improve their practices to promote social inclusion; establish policies to eradicate all forms of racism and discrimination; and promote human rights and diversity

== History (1945-2012) ==
- 1945 The Constitution of UNESCO is signed in London, England on 16 November 1945, and comes into force on 4 November 1946 after ratification by 20 countries. Canada is one of the founding members. Vincent Massey, High Commissioner for Canada to the UK, leads the Canadian Delegation at the historic founding conference in London.
- 1946 Victor Doré, Canada's Ambassador to Belgium and Luxembourg, is elected the first President of UNESCO's Executive Board.
- 1951 The Report of the Royal Commission on National Development in the Arts, Letters and Sciences Massey-Lévesque Report recommends the establishment of the Canada Council and of the Canadian Commission for UNESCO. The Right Honourable Vincent Massey, is named Chairman of the Commission.
- 1957 The Canada Council Act is passed by Parliament. It provides for the creation of the Canadian Commission for UNESCO, operating under the general authority of the Canada Council.
- 1959 UNESCO's Director-General Vittorini Veronese and the Prime Minister of Canada, John G. Diefenbaker, attend the Canadian Commission for UNESCO's first Annual General Meeting in Ottawa.
- 1968 UNESCO organizes the first conference on sustainable development, leading to the creation of UNESCO's Man and the Biosphere (MAB) Programme. Canada's first biosphere reserve, Mont Saint-Hilaire (Québec), is designated in 1978.
- 1972 The Convention concerning the Protection of the World Cultural and Natural Heritage is adopted by UNESCO. The first sites are inscribed on the World Heritage List in 1978, including Canadian sites L'Anse aux Meadows National Historic Site (Newfoundland and Labrador) and Nahanni National Park (Northwest Territories).
- 1978 Canada is the first importer/exporter country of cultural property to sign the 1970 Convention on the Means of Prohibiting and Preventing the Illicit Import, Export and Transfer of Ownership of Cultural Property.
- 1980 UNESCO adopts the Recommendation concerning the Status of the Artist. Paul Siren, later President of the Canadian Conference of the Arts, chairs the Joint Committee of Experts.
- 1991 Marie Bernard-Meunier, Canada's Ambassador and Permanent Delegate to UNESCO, is the first woman to be elected Chairperson of UNESCO's Executive Board.
- 1999 Michel Agnaïeff is Chair of the Task Force on "UNESCO in the 21st Century" for UNESCO's Executive Board. From 1998-2002 Mr. Agnaïeff is President of the Canadian Commission for UNESCO.
- 2001 The Canadian Commission for UNESCO becomes coordinator of National Commissions of the Europe Region until 2005.
- 2002 Michèle Stanton-Jean is elected President of the International Bioethics Committee (IBC) whose work leads to the 2005 Universal Declaration on Bioethics and Human Rights.From 2006-2010, Ms. Stanton-Jean is President of the Canadian Commission for UNESCO.
- 2005 At the 33rd UNESCO General Conference, Member States adopt the Convention on the Protection and Promotion of the Diversity of Cultural Expressions, the International Convention against Doping in Sport and the Universal Declaration on Bioethics and Human Rights. Canada plays a leading role in the development of each of these standard-setting instruments and is the first country to accept the Convention on the Protection and Promotion of the Diversity of Cultural Expressions. That same year Canada accepts the International Convention against Doping in Sport.
- 2006 The Agreement between the Government of Canada and the Government of Québec concerning the United Nations Educational, Scientific and Cultural Organization (UNESCO) is signed. Under the terms of the Agreement, the Executive Committee of the Commission now includes a representative of the Government of Québec. Michel Audet is appointed as first Representative of the Government of Québec in the Canadian Permanent Delegation to UNESCO.
- 2008 Christina Cameron is Chairperson of the World Heritage Committee which holds its 32nd Session in Québec City in July 2008. The Canadian Commission organizes the Session's Youth Component. In 2010, Ms. Cameron is named Vice-President of the Commission.
- 2011 Irina Bokova, first woman Director-General of UNESCO, gives the keynote address at the Canadian Commission's 51st Annual General Meeting in Ottawa. Michèle Stanton-Jean, Past President of the Commission, is named Representative of Québec to the Permanent Delegation of Canada to UNESCO.
- 2012 The Commission initiates consultations on its future directions to ensure its activities continue to respond to the needs of Canadians.

== See also ==
- National Commissions for UNESCO
  - Australian National Commission for UNESCO
  - German Commission for UNESCO
  - Indian National Commission for Cooperation with UNESCO
