= J1 J2 model =

The J1–J2 model is a quantum spin model like the Heisenberg model but also includes a term for the interaction between next-nearest neighbor spins.

== Hamiltonian ==
In this model, the term $J_1$ represents the usual nearest-neighbor interaction as seen in the Heisenberg model, and $J_2$ represents the exchange interaction to the next nearest-neighbor.

$$\hat H = J_1 \sum_{\langle ij \rangle}\vec S_i \cdot \vec S_j + J_2 \sum_{\langle\langle ij \rangle\rangle} \vec S_i \cdot \vec S_j$$

Where:

- $\vec{S}_i$ is the spin operator at lattice site $i$
- $\langle i, j \rangle$ is the list of nearest neighbors
- $\langle\langle i,j\rangle\rangle$ is the list of next-nearest neighbors

== Geometric Frustration ==
In the study of magnetic systems, the possibility of geometric frustration arises when either the geometry of the lattice model or competing interactions prevent the spin from adopting a simple ordered arrangement which minimizes all bond energies simultaneously. When both $J_1 > 0$ and $J_2 > 0$ the two interactions are frustrated. The ground state of the $J_1$ term alone is the Néel State which is a checkerboard of opposing spins while the $J_2$ term alone favors a Collinear Striped State in which rows are ferromagnetic along one direction and antiferromagnetically aligned along the other. The competition between these orders drives the physics of the model.

== Ground State Phase Diagram ==
=== Classical Limit ===
In the classical limit (where quantum fluctuations are negligible), the ground state undergoes a first-order phase transition at the critical ratio $J_2/J_1 = 0.5$. For $J_2/J_1 < 0.5$, the Néel state is stable; for $J_2/J_1 > 0.5$, the striped collinear state is stable.

=== Quantum Case: S = 1/2 ===
For quantum spins, particularly $S = 1/2$, quantum fluctuations alter the phase diagram significantly. The following phases have been established:

- Néel phase ($0 \lesssim J_2/J_1 \lesssim 0.4$): Long-range antiferromagnetic order similar to the Heisenberg model, though with reduced staggered magnetization due to quantum fluctuations.
- Quantum paramagnetic / spin liquid phase ($0.4 \lesssim J_2/J_1 \lesssim 0.6$): An intermediate region without conventional magnetic long-range order. This is a leading candidate for a quantum spin liquid state, where spins remain dynamically disordered even at zero temperature.
- Collinear striped phase ($J_2/J_1 \gtrsim 0.6$): Magnetic order returns, but with the collinear stripe pattern.

The transition from Néel phase to spin liquid phase is generally believed to be continuous (second-order), while the transition into collinear phase is first-order.

== See also ==
- Spin model
- Heisenberg model (quantum)
- Hubbard model
- t-J model
- Majumdar–Ghosh model
