= Andrée Paradis =

Canadian art critic, radio host (1919–1986)

- Born: 26 May 1919; Montreal, Quebec
- Died: 27 August 1986 (aged 67); Montreal Quebec
- Occupations: art critic, editor, radio host, television host
- Years active: 1954-1986
- Notable work: Vie des Arts

Andrée Paradis (26 May 1919 — 27 August 1986) was a Canadian arts critic, television host, and radio personality. She was a director and editor-in-chief of the art magazine Vie des Arts from 1964 until her death.

== Early life and education ==
Paradis was born in Montreal, Quebec. She attended college in Ottawa, later attending the College de France and the Sorbonne in 1952–1953.

== Career ==
From 1954 to 1965 Paradis hosted television cultural programmes Rêves et Réalité, Réflexion Faite, and Le Quotidien Magique. As a radio host she hosted the programme Arc-en-ciel from 1959 to 1963. She presided over the International Association of Art Critics (1977–1980), and served on the Canadian branch of the organization from 1983 until 1986. She later taught art history at the University du Quebec a Trois Rivières.

Paradis was involved in shaping Canadian cultural policy, serving as a founding member of the Canada Council for the Arts and its Arts Advisory Committee and was a founding vice-president of the Canadian Commission for UNESCO from 1960 to 1962. She served on the Quebec Cultural Property Commission (1972–1977) and the Canadian Cultural Property Export Review Board (1977–1982). At the municipal level she served as vice-president of the Arts Council of the Montreal Metropolitan Area (1971–1975). She was Commissioner on the Commission of Inquiry on Arts Education in Quebec (the Rioux Commission) from 1966 to 1968. She later served as a member of the Council of Universities from 1974 to 1978.

At the international level, Paradis served as vice-president of the International Association of Arts Critics from 1977 to 1980 and again from 1983 to 1986. She also served as president of the National Arts Centre from 1965 to 1970.

== Editorial work ==
Paradis was a founding member of the magazine Vie des arts, a contemporary art magazine launched in 1956. Between 1964 and 1986 she served as the magazine's director and editor-in-chief. In 1988, the Board of Directors of the magazine created the Andrée-Paradis Prize intended to support a young art critic. Recipients of the prize include Jean-Émile Verdier, Andrée Martin, Suzanne LeBlanc and Veronique Lefebvre.

== Awards ==
- Canada Centennial Medal (1967)
- Officer of the Order of Canada (1969)
