= Barry Ramachandra Rao =

Indian space physicist

- Born: 21 November 1922; Yalamanchili, Visakhapatnam, Andhra Pradesh, India
- Died: 24 September 2005 (aged 82); Visakhapatnam, Andhra Pradesh, India
- Education: Andhra University
- Known for: Studies on radio physics
- Awards: 1944 AU Sripathi Medal; 1945 AU Metcalf Medal; 1965 Shanti Swarup Bhatnagar Prize
- Scientific career
- Fields: Space physics
- Workplaces: CSIRO; UGC; National Fisheries Advisory Board
- Doctoral advisor: Suri Bhagavantam; David Forbes Martyn

Barry Ramachandra Rao (21 November 1922 – 24 September 2005) was an Indian space physicist and the vice chairman of the University Grants Commission of India. Known for his pioneering research in radio physics, Rao was a Member of Parliament of the Rajya Sabha and an elected fellow of all the three major Indian science academies viz. Indian Academy of Sciences, Indian National Science Academy and National Academy of Sciences, India. The Council of Scientific and Industrial Research, the apex agency of the Government of India for scientific research, awarded him the Shanti Swarup Bhatnagar Prize for Science and Technology, one of the highest Indian science awards for his contributions to Physical Sciences in 1965. (Note: Long link – please select award year to see details)

== Biography ==
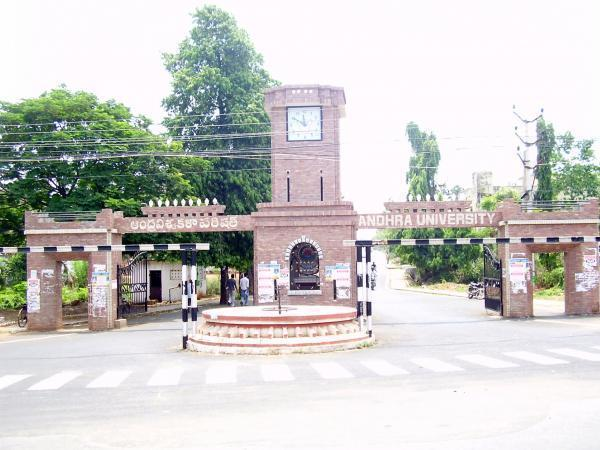
Entrance to Andhra University

B. Ramachandra Rao was born on 21 November 1922 at Yalamanchili, a small village in Visakhapatnam district of the undivided Andhra Pradesh in British India in a fisherman's family of limited financial means. After early schooling at local institutions, he did his intermediate course at Visakhapatnam before joining Andhra University for his graduate studies. It was during this time, he had the opportunity to train under Suri Bhagavantam, a known physicist, who would later go on to become the vice chancellor of Osmania University. After completing the degree of BSc (hons) in 1944 winning Sripathi Medal for standing first in the university, he obtained the degree of MSc in 1945, again with a first rank which earned him the Metcalf Medal. Subsequently, he joined Andhra University as a lecturer and simultaneously did his doctoral studies on diffraction of light by high frequency ultrasonic waves under the guidance of Bhagavantam, to secure the degree of Doctor of Science in 1949.

On receiving a Commonwealth Senior Research Fellowship, Rao moved to Australia to do his post-doctoral work with David Forbes Martyn, a T. K. Sidey Medal recipient, and a Fellow of the Royal Society at his laboratory at Commonwealth Scientific and Industrial Research Organisation (CSIRO). At Martyn's laboratory, he worked on experimental space physics and after returning to India, he resumed his career at Andhra University where spent the rest of his academic career till his superannuation as a professor and head of the department of physics. In 1976, the Government of India appointed him as the vice chairman of the University Grants Commission and he held the post for two terms until 1982 when he was elected to the Rajya Sabha. He completed one full term as a member of parliament (1982–88) and later served as the part-time chair of the National Fisheries Advisory Board in 1989.

Rao died on 24 September 2005, at the age of 82, survived by his wife and siblings.

== Legacy ==
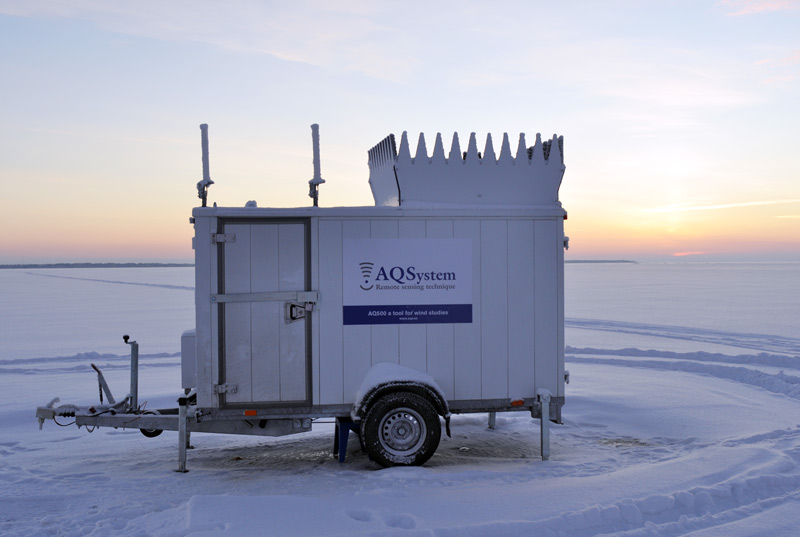
AQ500 SoDAR used in wind energy development and wind condition monitoring

One of the principal contributions of Rao in the academic field was the establishment of a laboratory for Ionosphere and Space Research (ISRL) at the Waltair campus of Andhra University which would evolve into an advanced space science centre, and it was here, he hosted a number of researchers. He was also instrumental in introducing computer at the university. He maintained his interest in ultrasonics which he had worked on during his doctoral studies and his initial work at ISRL led to the discovery that diffraction patterns followed Bragg's Law in high frequency regions. For furthering their research, the team led by him developed novel methodologies for measuring ultrasonic velocities in liquids and solids with high precision and developed purpose-built instruments such as transmitters, receivers and oscillographs for pulse measurement, seismic sounders and satellite signal recorders. He designed a multi-frequency HF phase path radar which was the first equipment of its kind that used spaced-receiver configuration.

The other equipment developed by his team included an HF phase path sounder which was a first time development, as well as an ionospheric drift recorder, a meteor radar and a SOnic Detection And Ranging system (SODAR). He and his colleagues published seven articles detailing the body of their work in ultrasonics and six of them appeared in Nature. This pioneering research on ionospheric plasma contributed to the development of HF Doppler radar, meteor radar and SODAR systems presently in use. He also carried out studies on Ionospheric dynamo region and on the horizontal winds over a sunspot cycle. His studies have been documented by way of a number of articles (Note: Please see Selected bibliography section) of which many have been listed by the article repository of the Indian Academy of Sciences. He also edited three books, Physics of the solid state : commemoration volume to Professor S. Bhagavantam, and Bhagavantam Volume: Volume in Honour of Prof. S. Bhagavantam on the Occasion of the 60th Birthday, 14.04.1969 both festschrifts on his mentor, as well as Science, Technology and Education for Prosperity, and his work has drawn citations in books published by others.

Rao, who is reported to have introduced many educational plans during his tenure as the vice-chair of the University Grants Commission of India, presided the Indian Science Congress on Man and the ocean – resource and development of 1983 held in Tirupati. He served as the president of the National Academy of Sciences, India and the Acoustical Society of India during 1981–82. He was a member of the governing body of the Council of Scientific and Industrial Research during 1977–89 and sat in the science and engineering council of the Department of Science and Technology from 1977 to 1981. He chaired the Indian National Committee for International Union of Radio Science (INCURSI) and was a member of the committees of the International Union of Pure and Applied Physics for India and Tropospheric scatter communications networks. He also served as an honorary consultant to Defence Research and Development Organization.

== Awards and honors ==
Rao received of the Sripathi Medal and Metcalf Medal of Andhra University during his college days; the university would honor him again with a doctorate (honoris causa) in 1970. The Council of Scientific and Industrial Research awarded him the Shanti Swarup Bhatnagar Prize, one of the highest Indian science awards in 1965. The Indian National Science Academy elected him as a fellow in 1969 and he became a fellow of the Indian Academy of Sciences and the National Academy of Sciences, India in 1974 and 1978 respectively. He was also a fellow of the Andhra Pradesh Academy of Sciences, Astronomical Society of India and Indian Physics Association and Acoustical Society of India. The award orations delivered by him included Professor Suri Bhagavantam oration to commemorate his 60th birthday in 1977, Sir C. V. Raman Endowment oration of Madurai Kamaraj University in 1981 and G. P. Chatterjee Fellowship oration of Bengal Engineering College in 1982.

== Selected bibliography ==
=== Books ===
- S Bhagavantam; S Balakrishna; Mada Krishnamurthi; B Ramachandra Rao (1969). Physics of the solid state : commemoration volume to Professor S. Bhagavantam. Academic Press. p. 9780120766505. ISBN 9780120766505.
- S. Bhagavantam, S. Balakrishna, M. Krishnamurthy, B. Ramachandra Rao (1969). Bhagavantam Volume: Volume in Honour of Prof. S. Bhagavantam on the Occasion of the 60th Birthday, 14.04.1969. Bangalore Printing & Pub Co. ASIN B001A9A2M6.
- S Bhagavantam, B Ramachandra Rao, S Balakrishna (1979). Science, Technology & Education for Prosperity. Unknown Binding. p. 216. ASIN B005W7VPBY.

=== Article ===
- S. Bhagavantham, B. Ramachandra Rao (1947). "Diffraction of light by high-frequency ultrasonic waves". Nature. 159 (4034): 267. Bibcode:1947Natur.159..267B. doi:10.1038/159267a0. PMID 20287528.
- B Ramachandra Rao (1950). "A new ultrasonic method for determining elastic constants". Current Science. 19 (5): 148–149. PMID 15427340.
- P R K L Padmini; B Ramachandra Rao (1961). "Study of Temperature Variation of Ultrasonic Velocity and Adiabatic Compressibility in Some Liquids–Part I". Journal of the Physical Society of Japan. 16 (9): 1770–1776. Bibcode:1961JPSJ...16.1770P. doi:10.1143/JPSJ.16.1770.
- P R K L Padmini; B Ramachandra Rao (1962). "Study of Temperature Variation of Ultrasonic Velocity and Adiabatic Compressibility in Some Liquids–Part II". Journal of the Physical Society of Japan. 17 (11): 1792–1798. doi:10.1143/JPSJ.17.1792.
- M G Seshagiri Rao; B Ramachandra Rao (1964). "Temperature Variation of Acoustic Velocity in Aqueous Solutions of Electrolytes". Journal of the Physical Society of Japan. 19 (8): 1394–1401. Bibcode:1964JPSJ...19.1394R. doi:10.1143/JPSJ.19.1394.
- A S Mohana Rao; B Ramachandra Rao (1968). "Some studies on the ionospheric absorption at Waltair". Journal of Atmospheric and Terrestrial Physics. 30 (6): 1239–1244. Bibcode:1968JATP...30.1239M. doi:10.1016/S0021-9169(68)80012-1.
- Sastri, J. Hanumath; Rao, B. Ramachandra (1973). "The skewness of correlation functions in drift measurements". Journal of Atmospheric and Terrestrial Physics. 35 (3): 583–587. Bibcode:1973JATP...35..583S. doi:10.1016/0021-9169(73)90048-2.
