= India International =

India International can refer to:

- India International Centre
- India International Challenge
- India International Convention and Expo Centre
- India International Exchange
- India International Film Festival
- India International Friendship Society
- India International Science Festival
- India International Trade Fair
- Miss India International

== Education ==
- India International School in Japan
- India International School (Kuwait)
