= Rangappa =

Rangappa is a Kodava surname. Notable people with the surname include:

- Asha Rangappa (born 1974), American legal scholar
- K. S. Rangappa, Indian chemistry professor
