= K. C. Pandey =

Indian zoologist (1943–2019)

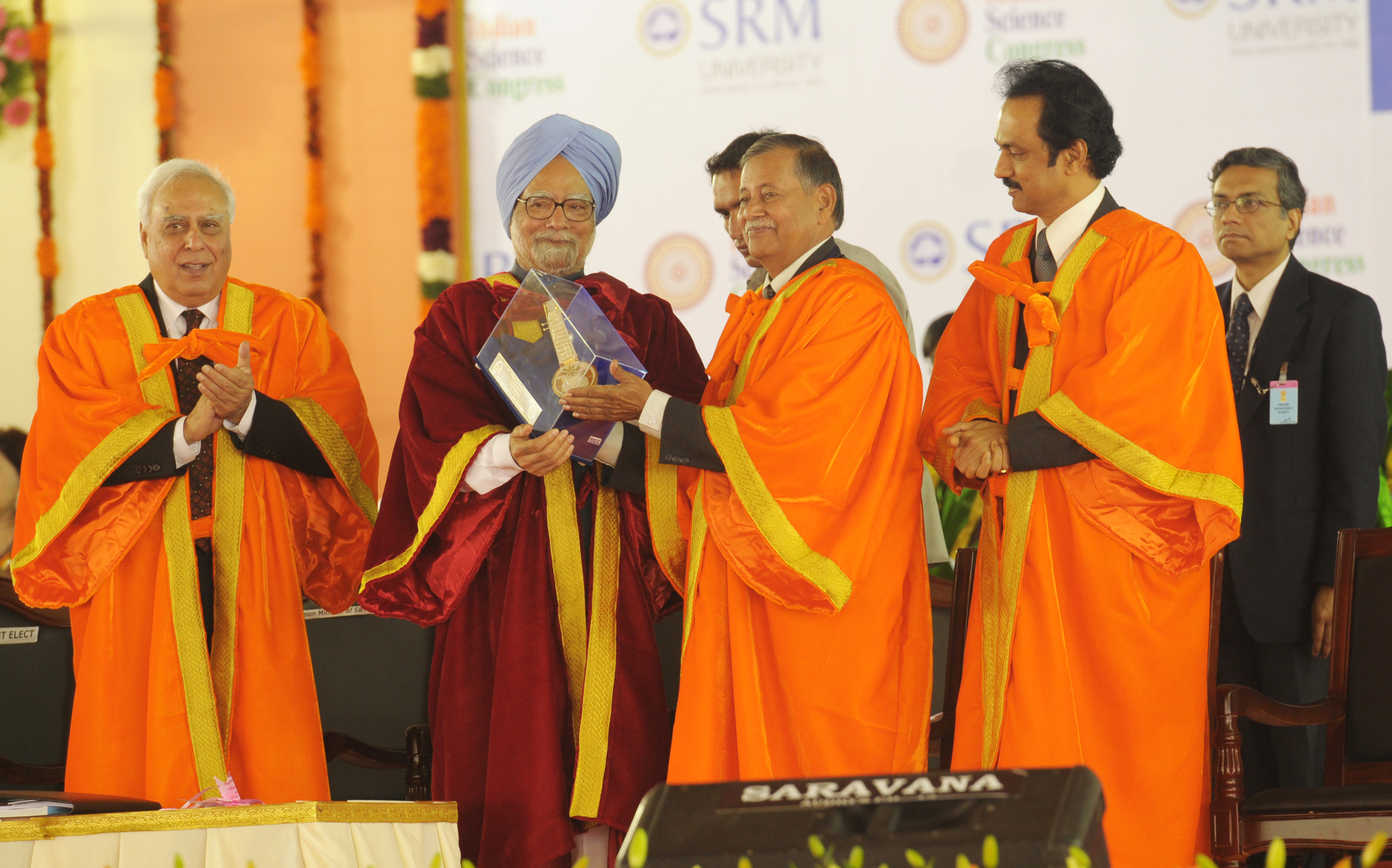
- Then Prime Minister of India, Dr. Manmohan Singh being presented a memento by the President of ISCA, Prof. K.C. Pandey, at the inauguration of the 98th Indian Science Congress, Chennai, on 3 January 2011
- Born: Keshav Chandra Pandey; 5 July 1943; Ballia, Uttar Pradesh India
- Died: 1 December 2019 (aged 76); Lucknow
- Education: Ph.D.; D.Sc.
- Alma mater: Lucknow University
- Known for: Helminthiasis; Trematoda; Cestoda; Nematodes; Acanthocephala; Monogenea
- Scientific career
- Fields: Zoology; Parasitology
- Institutions: Lucknow University; Chaudhary Charan Singh University

Keshav Chandra Pandey (5 July 1943 – 1 December 2019), popularly known as K. C. Pandey, was an Indian educationist and zoologist with 55 years research experience, a Fellow of the Zoological Society of India (F.ZSI), and a Fellow of the Helminthological Society of India (FHSI).

== Career ==
Pandey started his teaching career in 1967 at Zoology Department, Lucknow University. In 1980 he was selected as Professor and Head in the Department of Zoology, Meerut University (now CCS University, Meerut). He rejoined Lucknow University in 1990, and eventually became Dean of the Faculty of Science.

From 1994 to 1997 Pandey served as the Vice Chancellor of CCS University, Meerut, and, after his full term as Vice Chancellor, he rejoined Lucknow University in late 1997. His teaching experience spanned about 50 years, during which he supervised more than 50 Ph.D. and MPhil candidates. After his retirement from Lucknow University, he continued with research work and ISCA where he got elected as the 98th General President of the Indian Science Congress Association in 2010–11. It was inaugurated by Prime Minister Manmohan Singh. As a Life Member of ISCA, he held various positions before getting elected as the General President (2010–2011), including member of the Executive Council and Recorder (2001–2002) and Sectional President (2005–2006) of Animal, Veterinary and Fishery Sciences.

Pandey was also member of the Institute Body of AIIMS, New Delhi.

Pandey undertook advanced research on Fish parasitology and has authored or co-authored about 200 research papers. His work was on biodiversity of helminthes and parasites of vertebrates in general, and fish in particular. His work on new and known species of trematode, Cestode nematode, monogenea, and acanthocephalan, which cause mass mortalities.

As a researcher, he presented various research papers like one in International Symposium on Monogenea. His last book was released after his death.

In 2010, Pandey was selected as Emeritus Professor at the Department of Zoology, CCS University. He remained in this post until his death.

== Medals and awards ==
- BS Chauhan Gold Medal by Zoological Society of India (1980 )
- Bhalerao Gold Medal by Helminthological Society of India (1991)
- Indian Society of Life Sciences Gold Medal (1981)
- K.N. Bahl Memorial Gold Medal by Indian Society of Biosciences (1994–1995)
- Congress of Zoology Gold Medal by Zoological Society of India (2005)
- Sir Dorba Ji Tata Gold Medal by Zoological Society of India (1995–1997)
- E.P. Odum Gold Medal by International Society for Communication (2007)
- Sarswati Samman by Government of Uttar Pradesh (2010)
- Great World Earth Legend Award (2017)

== Selected bibliography ==
- K. C. Pandey (1988). Concepts of Indian Fisheries. Shree Publishing House. p. 146. ISBN 9788183294782
- K. C. Pandey (1996). Functional Morphology Of Wallago Attu (schneider). Shree Publishers & Distributors. p. 320. ISBN 8170711614, 9788170711612.
- K. C. Pandey (2018). Trematode Fauna of Freshwater Fishes of India. Zoological Survey of India. p. 388. ISBN 9788181715098
- K. C. Pandey (2020). Textbook of ICHTHYOLOGY. Daya Publishing House . p. 554. ISBN 9789389719413

== Selected research papers ==
- Ray, Shailendra; Pandey, K. C.; Agrawal, Nirupama (2015). "A new species of an interesting amphistome Pseudodiplodiscoides Murty, 1970 in Bellamya bengalensis Lamarck, 1882 from water bodies near district Barabanki, U.P." Journal of Parasitic Diseases. 39 (3): 536–538. doi:10.1007/s12639-013-0391-5. PMC 4554574. PMID 26345066.
- Tripathi, Amit; Agrawal, Nirupama; Pandey, Keshav C. (2007). "A Monogenoid from the Gills of Freshwater Garfish, Xenentodon cancila (Teleostei: Beloniformes: Belonidae) in India, with Proposal of Xenentocleidus n. G. (Monogenoidea: Dactylogyridae)". Comparative Parasitology. 74 (2): 260–263. doi:10.1654/4236.1. S2CID 85800301.
- Tripathi, Amit; Agrawal, Nirupama; Pandey, Keshav C. (2007). "The Status of Quadriacanthus Paperna, 1961 and Anacornuatus Dubey et al., 1991 (Monogenoidea: Dactylogyridae) with Redescription of Q. Kobiensis Ha Ky, 1968, new geographical records for Q. Bagrae Paperna, 1979 and Q. Clariadis Paperna, 1961 from India and a Note on Speciation in Monogenoidea". Parasitology International. 56 (1): 23–30. doi:10.1016/j.parint.2006.10.004. PMID 17234447.
- Kritsky, Delane C.; Pandey, K.C.; Agrawal, Nirupama; Abdullah, Shamall M.A. (2004). "Monogenoids from the gills of spiny eels (Teleostei: Mastacembelidae) in India and Iraq, proposal Of mastacembelocleidus gen. n., and status of the Indian species of Actinocleidus, Urocleidus and Haplocleidus (Monogenoidea: Dactylogyridae)". Folia Parasitologica. 51 (4): 291–298. doi:10.14411/fp.2004.036. PMID 15729940.
- Pandey, K.C.; Agrawal, Nirupama; Vishwakarma, Pushpa; Sharma, Jaya (2003). "Redescription of some Indian species of Thaparocleidus Jain, 1952 (Monogenea), with aspects of the developmental biology and mode of attachment of T. Pusillus (Gusev, 1976)". Systematic Parasitology. 54 (3): 207–221. doi:10.1023/A:1022633208319. PMID 12652072. S2CID 22304082.
- Pandey, K. C. (1971). "On a Rare Cercaria, Cercaria soparkari n.sp., (Transversotrematidae) from Lucknow, India". Journal of Helminthology. 45 (4): 321–326. doi:10.1017/S0022149X00000584. S2CID 85694464.
- Pandey, K. C.; Choudhry, Sangeeta (1989). "Inorganic elements in the adults of Ascaridia galli (Schrank, 1788)". Journal of Helminthology. 63 (1): 75–76. doi:10.1017/S0022149X00008762. PMID 2723388. S2CID 28149015.
