= C.M.S. St. John's High School =

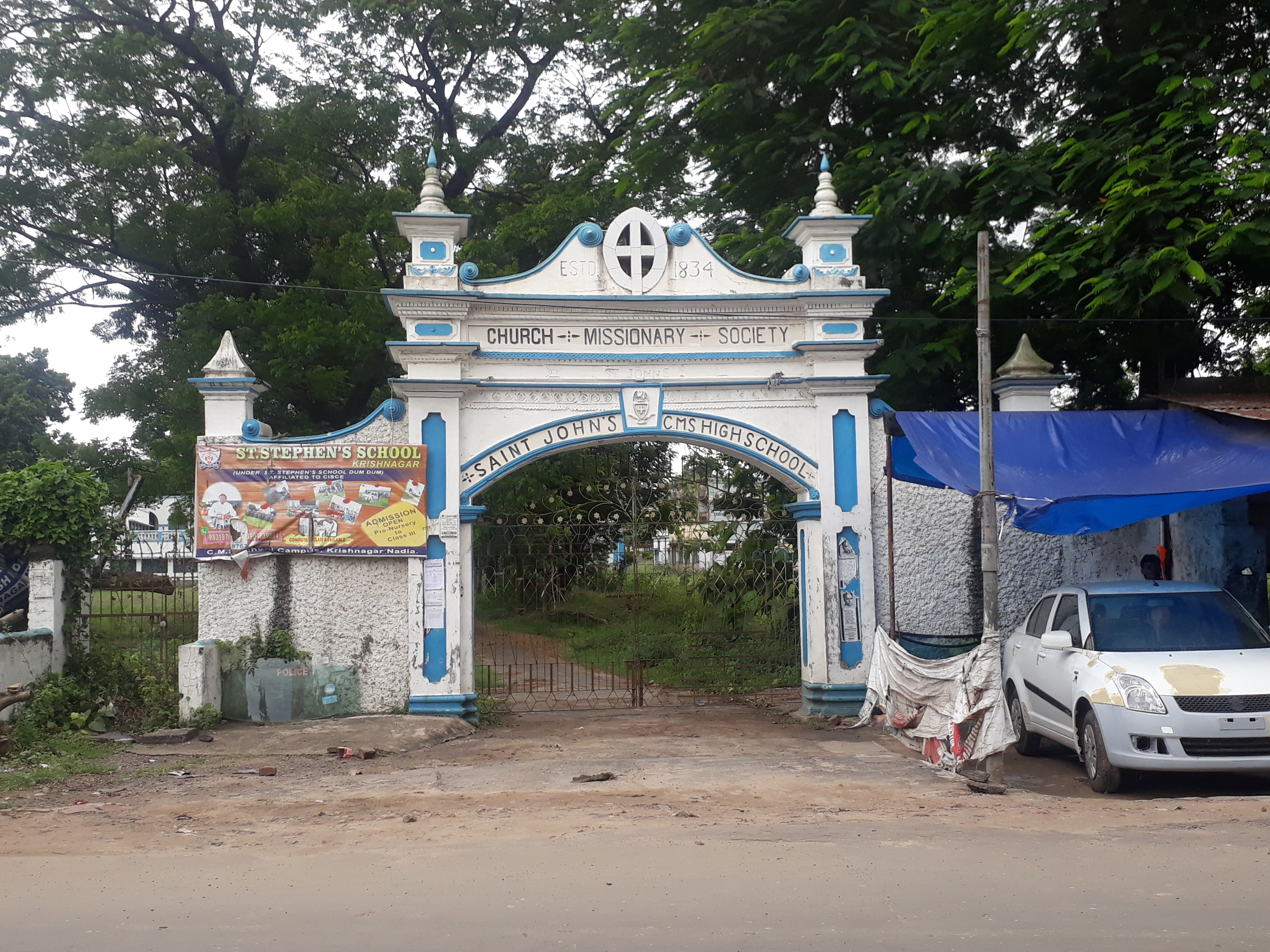
- Main entrance of C.M.S. St. John's School

Location
- Krishnanagar; West Bengal, 741101; India
- Coordinates: 23.4082045°N 88.4883113°E

Information
- Established: 1834; 192 years ago

C.M.S. St. John's High School is the oldest school in Nadia district and sixth oldest educational institution in the Indian state of West Bengal. It is situated in Krishnanagar, Nadia.

== History ==
In the 18th century, in order to spread English education and missionaries' works, the Church Missionary Society established some societies which were mostly controlled by the church. Such missionary work was started in Nadia in 1832 by the C.M.S. committee and C.M.S St. John's High School was established in 1834 by German Christian missionaries. Rev. W.Deerr and Rev. Blumhardt founded the school at Krishnagar town, before the Krishnagar municipality and Krishnagar Government College.

== Notable alumni ==
- Chanchal Kumar Majumdar
- Sourindra Mohan Sircar
- Soumitra Chatterjee

== See also ==
- Education in India
- List of schools in India
- Education in West Bengal
