= International Association of Art Critics =

The International Association of Art Critics (French: Association Internationale des Critiques d’Art, AICA) was founded in 1950 to revitalise critical discourse, which suffered under fascism during World War II. Affiliated with UNESCO AICA was admitted to the rank of non-governmental organization in 1951.
The main objectives of AICA are:

- to promote the critical disciplines in the field of visual arts
- to ensure their having sound methodological and ethical bases
- to protect the ethical and professional interests of art critics by defending the rights of all members equally
- to ensure permanent communication among its members by encouraging international meetings
- to facilitate and improve information and international exchanges in the field of visual arts
- to contribute to the reciprocal knowledge and closer understanding of differing cultures
- to provide collaboration with developing countries

During the 1973 General Assembly of the organisation in SFR Yugoslavia, which took place in Zagreb, Ljubljana, Belgrade and Dubrovnik, art critic Célestin Badibanga from Kinshasa called upon the organisation to "move beyond the Eurocentric tendencies in art".

== Organizational Background ==
International Association of Art Critics

- Acronym: AICA
- Type: NGO
- Field: International association and cultural institution
- Industry: other organizations operating on a voluntary membership basis
- Affiliation: Works in association with UNESCO
- Legal form: Registered association
- Founded: 1950
- Headquarters: Paris, France
- Geographical Area: International
- Website: https://aicainternational.news/
- AICA President: Małgorzata Kaźmierczak (2024–2026), flag Poland, President of the International Association of Art Critics. She is an art historian, independent curator, and critic, and was elected to lead AICA International.

== Former AICA Presidents ==
AICA has a long international history with many distinguished presidents. Some known former presidents include:

- Lisbeth Rebollo Gonçalves (2018-2023), flag Brazil, later Honorary President.
- Marek Bartelik (2011-2017), flag USA/Poland, later Honorary President.
- Yacouba Konaté (2008-2011), flag of the Ivory Coast, later Honorary President.
- Henry Meyric Hughes (2003-2007), flag UK, later Honorary President.
- Kim Levin (1996 to 2002), flag USA, later Honorary President.
- Jacques Leenhardt (1990-1996), flag France, later Honorary President.
- Andrée Paradis (1977-1980), director and editor-in-chief of the art magazine Vie des Arts

== International Structure ==
Support international dialogue among critics, curators, and scholars. Contribute to the documentation and understanding of contemporary art through AICA Members: Thousands of art critics across 80+ countries, organized into national sections. Scope: Visual art and modern art criticism worldwide. Membership: Generally open to professional art critics (writers, scholars, curators with a strong critical practice). Applications are typically handled through national AICA sections. Current Branches:

- AICA Argentina
- AICA Armenia
- AICA Austria
- AICA Belgium
- AICA Brazil
- AICA Canada
- AICA Catalonia (ACCA)
- AICA Costa Rica
- AICA Denmark
- AICA Dominican Republic
- AICA Finland
- AICA France
- AICA Germany
- AICA Greece
- AICA Hong Kong
- AICA Hungary
- AICA Ireland
- AICA Japan
- AICA Lithuania
- AICA Luxembourg
- AICA North Macedonia
- AICA Netherlands
- AICA Paraguay
- AICA Poland
- AICA Portugal
- AICA Slovakia
- AICA Spain
- AICA Spain (AECA)
- AICA South Korea
- AICA United Kingdom
- AICA United States
- AICA South Caribbean
- AICA Sweden
- AICA Switzerland
- AICA Taiwan
- AICA Turkey

== AICA Legacy ==
The legacy of the International Association of Art Critics (AICA) lies in its long-term impact on how modern and contemporary art is: discussed, evaluated, and protected worldwide. Intellectual & Cultural Legacy:

- Professionalization of art criticism: Since 1950, AICA has helped establish art criticism as a recognized, independent profession, not merely journalism or academic commentary.
- Global discourse: AICA created one of the earliest truly international platforms for art criticism, enabling dialogue between critics from Europe, the Americas, Africa, Asia, and the Middle East—often across political divides (including during the Cold War).
- Shaping contemporary art narratives: Through congresses, publications, and debates, AICA has influenced how movements such as abstraction, conceptual art, postcolonial art, feminist art, and new media art have been interpreted.

Ethical & Political Legacy:

- Defense of freedom of expression: In association with UNESCO, AICA has consistently defended critics and artists facing censorship, repression, or political pressure.
- Ethical standards: The organization promoted critical independence, resisting commercial, institutional, or state influence over criticism.
- Advocacy role: AICA has spoken out on issues of cultural policy, museum governance, and the social responsibility of art institutions.

Educational & Generational Legacy:

- Mentorship and emerging critics: Through awards, grants, and national sections, AICA has supported younger generations of critics, helping sustain critical writing in an era of shrinking media space.
- Archives and documentation: AICA congresses and proceedings form an important historical record of postwar and contemporary art debates.

Institutional Legacy: AICA helped legitimize the role of the critic within:

- Museums and biennials
- Universities and research institutions
- Cultural policy and international art organizations
- Many influential curators, historians, and theorists began or consolidated their careers through AICA networks.
- Ongoing Challenges (Part of the Legacy Too)
- Adapting criticism to digital platforms and social media
- Maintaining independence amid market-driven art systems
- Ensuring diversity beyond Euro-American perspectives

In short, AICA’s legacy is not tied to a single style or ideology, but to the idea that rigorous, independent, and globally connected art criticism matters—as a cultural, ethical, and democratic practice.
