= Maneklal Sankalchand Thacker =

Indian power engineer and academic

- Born: 3 December 1904; Bombay Presidency, British Raj
- Died: 16 December 1979 (aged 75); Ahmedabad, Gujarat, India
- Occupations: Power Engineer; Academic
- Years active: 1927–1996
- Known for: Power engineering
- Political party: Indian National Congress
- Parent(s): Sheth Sankalchand Dahyalal Thacker & Narmada Thacker
- Awards: Padma Bhushan

Maneklal Sankalchand Thacker (3 December 1904 – 16 December 1979) was an Indian power engineer, academic and the director general of the Council of Scientific and Industrial Research, the largest research and development organization in India. He served as a secretary at the Ministry of Scientific Research and Cultural Affairs (present-day Ministry of Culture) (1957–62) and sat in the Planning Commission of India as a member from 1962 to 1967. He was an elected fellow of the Indian Academy of Sciences and the Indian National Science Academy. The Government of India awarded him the third highest civilian honour of the Padma Bhushan, in 1955, for his contributions to literature and science education.

He was elected as the head of Freemasonry in India in January 1969 and continued until December 1974, after serving 2 consecutive terms as Most Worshipful The Grand Master of the Grand Lodge of India.

== Biography ==
M. S. Thacker was born in the Indian state of Gujarat on 3 December 1904 to a business tycoon of Ahmedabad Sankalchand Dahyalal Thacker and Narmada S. Thacker and did his early education at the state capital of Ahmedabad. Subsequently, he moved to the UK to continue his studies at the University of Bristol from where he graduated in engineering in 1927 to start his career as an engineer at the Electricity Department of Bristol Corporation, thus becoming the first Indian Indian to serve in that position. He served the corporation for four years and returned to India in 1931 to join Calcutta Electric Supply Corporation (CESC) where he served until May 1947. He was the first contracted officer of Indian origin at CESC and during his tenure there, he also continued his research activities as well as worked as a faculty member at two engineering colleges viz. Bengal Engineering College, Calcutta (now known as Indian Institute of Engineering Science and Technology, Shibpur and Banaras Hindu University Engineering College.

The Indian Institute of Science, Bangalore had started a department of power engineering by that time and Thacker joined the institution as a professor of the new department in 1947 and two years later, assumed the directorship of the department, a post he held until 1955 when he was appointed as the director general of the Council of Scientific and Industrial Research (CSIR), a government sponsored autonomous body and the largest research and development organization in the country. He headed the organization for seven years and in 1957, he was given the additional responsibility of a secretary at the Ministry of Scientific Research and Cultural Affairs. He held both the posts until 1962 and moved to a new position as a member of the Planning Commission of India for a five-year term, which ended in 1967. During this tenure, he chaired the UNESCO Advisory Committee on Research on Natural Sciences and presided the United Nations Conference on the Application of Science and Technology for the benefit of less developed areas, held in 1963.

Thacker was credited with efforts in putting applied science to use in power engineering. He was known to have consolidated the functioning of CSIR and contributed to the industrial development of India. He chaired the Governing Council of the Indian Institute of Technology, Delhi and was a member of the council of the Indian National Science Academy during 1954 to 1956. He presided the engineering and metallurgy section of the 1951 Indian Science Congress and was the general president of the 1958 session held in Chennai. He represented India in the standing committee of the British Commonwealth Scientific Conference and was a member of the governing councils of several science and educational organizations, Indian Council of Medical Research, National Book Trust, Birbal Sahni Institute of Palaeobotany, Indian Institute of Science, Administrative Staff College of India, and National Council of Applied Economic Research counting among them. He was the founder president of the Institute of Management and the Indian chapter of the Illuminating Engineering Society and served as the president of Institution of Engineers (India), Indian Institute of Metals and Energy Institute, besides serving as the vice president of Indian Association for the Cultivation of Science and the Indian National Science Academy. He also published a number of books including Science and Culture, Survey of literature on high voltage engineering and allied subjects, 1935-53 and Natural resources and their planned utilization.

== Family ==
Maneklal Thacker died on 16 December 1998, at the age of 94.

== Awards and honors ==
Thacker was an elected fellow of the Indian Academy of Sciences and the Indian National Science Academy. He received four honoris causa doctoral degrees; Doctor of Science from Mysore University and Banaras Hindu University, Doctor of Literature from Annamalai University and Doctor of Engineering from Roorkee University. The Government of India awarded him the civilian honor of the Padma Bhushan in 1955.

He was awarded the Grand Master's Order of Service to Masonry (OSM) on 30 November 1971 by the Grand Lodge of India.

== See also ==
- Council of Scientific and Industrial Research
- Planning Commission of India
