= John Simonsen =

English organic chemist

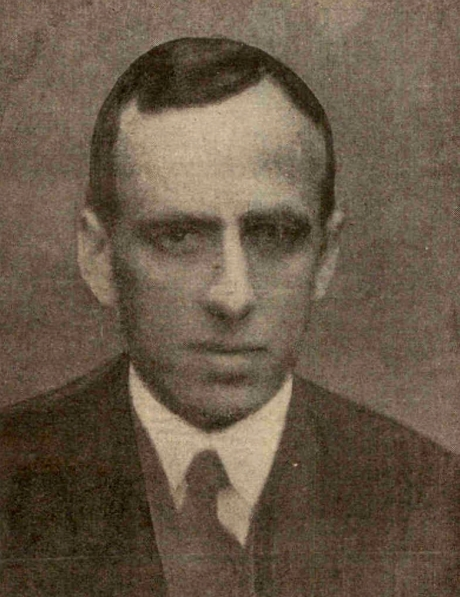

Sir John Lionel Simonsen (22 July 1884, in Levenshulme, Manchester – 20 February 1957, in London) was an English organic chemist who worked in India. He contributed to organic syntheses and studied the chemistry of many plant extracts. He was knighted in 1949.

== Life and work ==
Simonsen was born in Levenshulme, Manchester where their parents had settled from Denmark (his father Lionel Michael Simonsen was a merchant while his mother Sophie had several relatives in Copenhagen University), he went to a private school in Rusholme and then attended the Manchester Grammar School where he was influenced by the chemistry teacher Francis Jones. He took an interest in science after spending summers in Copenhagen where an uncle, Valdemar Henriques, taught physiology at the Landbrughy Skole. He then went to the University of Manchester, where he obtained his bachelor's degree with top grades in 1904, and a Ph.D. in 1909 as a student of William Henry Perkin Jr. In 1907 he became an assistant lecturer and demonstrator in Manchester. He joined Presidency College, Madras in 1910 and was a colleague of Charles Gibson. When Gibson went to England after World War I broke out, Simonsen stayed on in India, where he was an oil controller and advisor to the Indian Munitions Board. He was a founding member of the Indian Science Congress Association in 1914, serving as its secretary until 1926. From 1919 to 1925 he was chief chemist at the Forest Research Institute and College in Dehra Dun and from 1925 to 1928 professor at the Indian Institute of Science in Bangalore. In 1928 he returned to England, where he was first Gibson's colleague at Guy's Hospital in London. In 1930 he became a professor at the University of Wales in Bangor (Wales) where he remained until 1942. From 1943 to 1952 he was research director of the Colonial Products Research Council (later Tropical Products Research Council). In 1945 he became a member of the Agricultural Research Council.

Simonsen dealt with the chemistry of natural products, especially terpenes and sesquiterpenes. For example, he discovered 3-Carene in Indian turpentine. He often worked with A.E. Bradfield and A.R. Penfield, director of the Museum of Art and Sciences in Sydney, who provided him with interesting new natural products. He was primarily an experimenter and had little interest in theory. Ewart Jones was one of his doctoral students.

A visit with Robert Robinson to the Caribbean and the US in 1944 led to the establishment of the Microbiology Research Institute in Trinidad and the effective control of mosquitoes on the British Guiana coast, which significantly reduced child mortality. In 1946 he visited South and East Africa with Ian Heilbron.

In 1950 he received the Davy Medal. From 1932 he was a fellow of the Royal Society. In 1949 he was ennobled. In 1949 he received the Ernest Guenther Award from the American Chemical Society. He was an honorary doctorate in St. Andrews, Malaysia and Birmingham.

Simonsen married Jannet Dick, daughter of Robert Hendrie of Nairn in 1913. Jannet was a surgeon and worked for a while as a professor of pathology at Lady Hardinge College, New Delhi at the malaria research station in Simla. They had a daughter.

== Works ==
- John Shorter, Oxford Dictionary of National Biography, 2004
- Robert Robinson, Biographical Memoirs Fellows Royal Society 1960.
- Michael Freemantle: The Chemists War 1914–1918, Royal Society of Chemistry 2015, S. 222f
