= I. V. Subba Rao (scientist) =

Indian agricultural scientist (1934-2010)

- Born: 20 December 1934; Pasalapudi, Andhra Pradesh, India
- Died: 14 August 2010 (aged 75)
- Education: Andhra University; Indian Agricultural Research Institute
- Awards: Padmashri
- Scientific career
- Fields: Agriculture
- Workplaces: Acharya N. G. Ranga Agricultural University

The Vice President, Shri M. Venkaiah Naidu paying floral tributes to I.V. Subba Rao

Idupuganti Venkata Subba Rao (I. V. Subba Rao) M.Sc. Ph.D. (20 December 1934 – 14 August 2010) was an eminent Agricultural scientist.

He was born in Pasalapudi village near Tanuku in West Godavari district. His parents are Achanna and Munemma. He has done M.Sc. in agriculture from Andhra University and obtained his Ph.D. from Indian Agricultural Research Institute, New Delhi.

He was the director of research at the university before taking over as the Vice-Chancellor. He has served as vice chancellor of Acharya N. G. Ranga Agricultural University, Hyderabad for two terms and retired in 2003. The university became the first agricultural university in the country to organize Indian Science Congress. He was the General President of the 93rd Congress held in 2006.

He died of cancer on 14 August 2010 at the age of 75 years.

== Awards ==
- He was recipient of Padmashri in 2002 from Government of India for his distinguished services in Agriculture.
- Dr. Norman E. Borlaug Award in 2004.
- Ashutosh Mukherjee Memorial Award in 2007.
