= Indian Science Congress Association =

Science organisation in India

- Logo of ISCA
- Abbreviation: ISCA
- Founded: 1914; 112 years ago
- Founder: J. L. Simonsen; P. S. MacMahon
- Type: Professional organisation
- Location: 73, Lake East 6th Road, Kolkata, West Bengal, India
- Region served: India, Worldwide
- Members: 30,000
- Key people: General President: Arvind Kumar Saxena; General Secretary: Kumar Verma
- Website: sciencecongress.nic.in

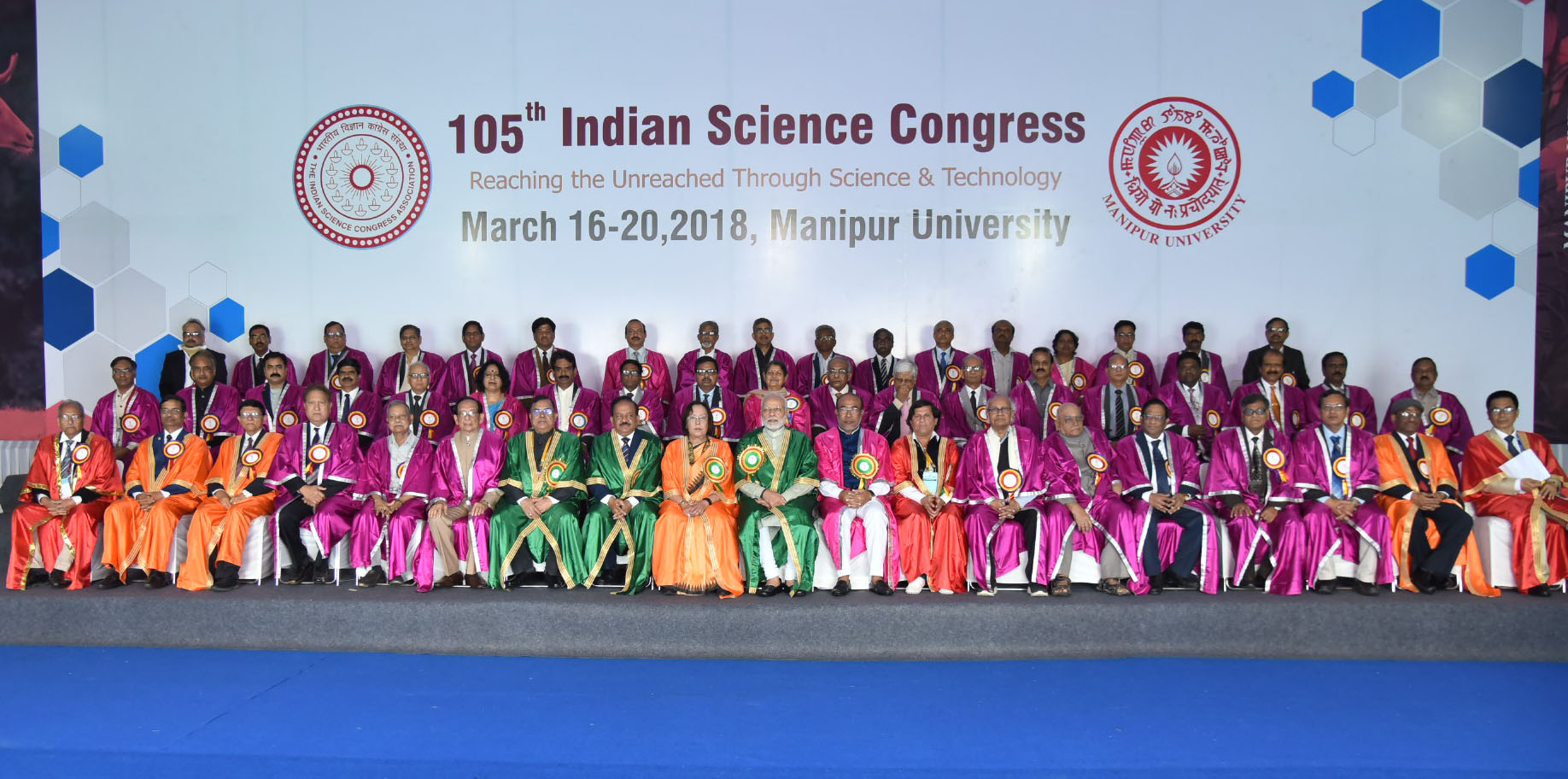
The Prime Minister, Shri Narendra Modi at the inauguration of the 105th session of Indian Science Congress, at Manipur University, in Imphal, Manipur

Indian Science Congress Association (ISCA) is a premier scientific organisation of India with headquarters at Kolkata, West Bengal. The association started in the year 1914 in Calcutta and it meets annually in the first week of January. It has a membership of more than 30,000 scientists.

The first Indian Science Congress was held in 1914 at the Asiatic Society in Calcutta. After attracting various speech-related controversies in recent years, the association established a policy that requires speakers at future conferences to be vetted and scrutinizes the content of their talks.

Several prominent Indian and foreign scientists, including Nobel laureates, attend and speak in the congress.

== Genesis ==
The Indian Science Congress Association (ISCA) owes its origin to the foresight and initiative of two British chemists, namely, Professor J. L. Simonsen and Professor P. S. MacMahon. It occurred to them that scientific research in India might be stimulated if an annual meeting of research workers somewhat on the lines of the British Association for the Advancement of Science could be arranged.

== Objectives ==
The Association was formed with the following objectives :

1. To advance and promote the cause of science in India;
2. To hold an annual congress at a suitable place in India;
3. To publish such proceedings, journals, transactions and other publications as may be considered desirable;
4. To secure and manage funds and endowments for the promotion of Science including the rights of disposing of or selling all or any portion of the properties of the Association;
5. To do and perform any or all other acts, matters and things as are conductive to, or incidental to, or necessary for, the above objects.

== Indian Science Congress sessions ==
=== First Congress ===
The first meeting of the congress was held from 15 to 17 January 1914 at the premises of the Asiatic Society, Calcutta. Ashutosh Mukherjee, the then Vice Chancellor of the University of Calcutta presided over the Congress. One hundred and five scientists from different parts of India and abroad attended it. Altogether 35 papers under 6 different sections, namely Botany, Chemistry, Ethnography, Geology, Physics and Zoology were presented.

=== Silver Jubilee ===
The Silver Jubilee Session of the Science Congress was held at Calcutta in 1938 under the presidency of Ernest Rutherford but due to his sudden death, James Jeans took the chair. It was at this Jubilee Session that the participation of foreign scientists in session of the Indian Science Congress was first initiated.

=== 34th Edition – Participation of foreign scientists ===
The 34th Annual Session of the Indian Science Congress was held at Delhi in 3–8 January 1947 with Pandit Jawaharlal Nehru as General president. Nehru's personal interest in the Science Congress continued and there was hardly any session which he did not attend. He immensely enriched the activities of the Congress by his sustained interest in the development of scientific atmosphere in the country, particularly among young generations. From 1947, his programme for inviting representatives from foreign societies and academies was included in the Science Congress. This trend still continues with the support of the Department of Science & Technology, Government of India.

=== Golden Jubilee ===
The Science Congress celebrated its Golden Jubilee in October 1963 at Delhi with Daulat Singh Kothari as General president. On this occasion two special publications were brought out:

1. A short History of the Indian Science Congress Association and
2. Fifty Years of Science in India (in 12 volumes, each volume containing reviews of particular branch of science)

=== Diamond Jubilee ===
The Diamond Jubilee Session of the Science Congress was held at Chandigarh in 3–9 January 1973, under the presidency of S. Bhagavantam. On this occasion two special publications were brought out:

1. A Decade (1963–72) Indian Science Congress Association (with life-sketches of General presidents) and
2. A Decade (1963–72) of Science in India(in section-wise).

=== 63rd edition – Introduction of focal theme ===
The year 1976 witnessed a significant departure in the trend of deliberations during the congress. It was being felt for sometime that such a gathering of scientists, covering a wide spectrum, ought to be concerned with national issues that have scientific and technological implications. In 1976, Dr. M. S. Swaminathan, the then General President of ISCA introduced the Focal Theme of national relevance which is now discussed in every section, committee and forum during the annual session. These apart, several plenary sessions are organised around various facets of the Focal Theme in which scientists and technologists as well as policy makers and administrators interact with one another. ISCA thus became a platform where members from different disciplines and from different walks of life could contribute to discussions on the Focal Theme.

=== 67th edition – Setting up of a task force ===
Another significant breakthrough was made in 1980 when the Department of Science & Technology, Government of India, set up a permanent Task Force involving representatives of ISCA and chiefs of different agencies and voluntary organizations chaired by Secretary, DST, as being responsible for following up various recommendations on the Focal Theme. Every year follow-up actions on recommendations made in the previous Science Congress are discussed at a General Session organized by DST during the Science Congress. Through this process, the Indian Science Congress Association has been contributing to the development of Science in general and National Science Policy, in particular.

=== Platinum Jubilee ===
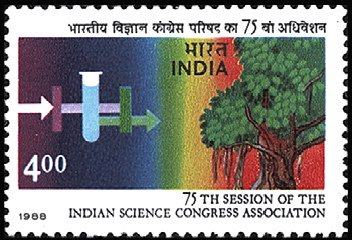
Indian postal stamp commemorating the 75th Session

The Indian Science Congress Association celebrated the seventy-fifth year of its inception, popularly called otherwise, Platinum Jubilee, in 1988, with C. N. R. Rao as General president. Keeping this in view, a special brochure, entitled "Indian Science Congress Association-Growth & Activities" was published so as to highlight the programmes of the Association over the years. The main programmes were:

1. Bringing out special publication on the occasion of the Platinum Jubilee
2. Presentation of Plaques to the General presidents of the Association
3. Establishment of Platinum Jubilee Lectures to be organised in each section during the annual session of the Science Congress and
4. Extension of the recent activities of the ISCA and its further diversification to generate scientific temper and popularise science

=== 98th edition ===
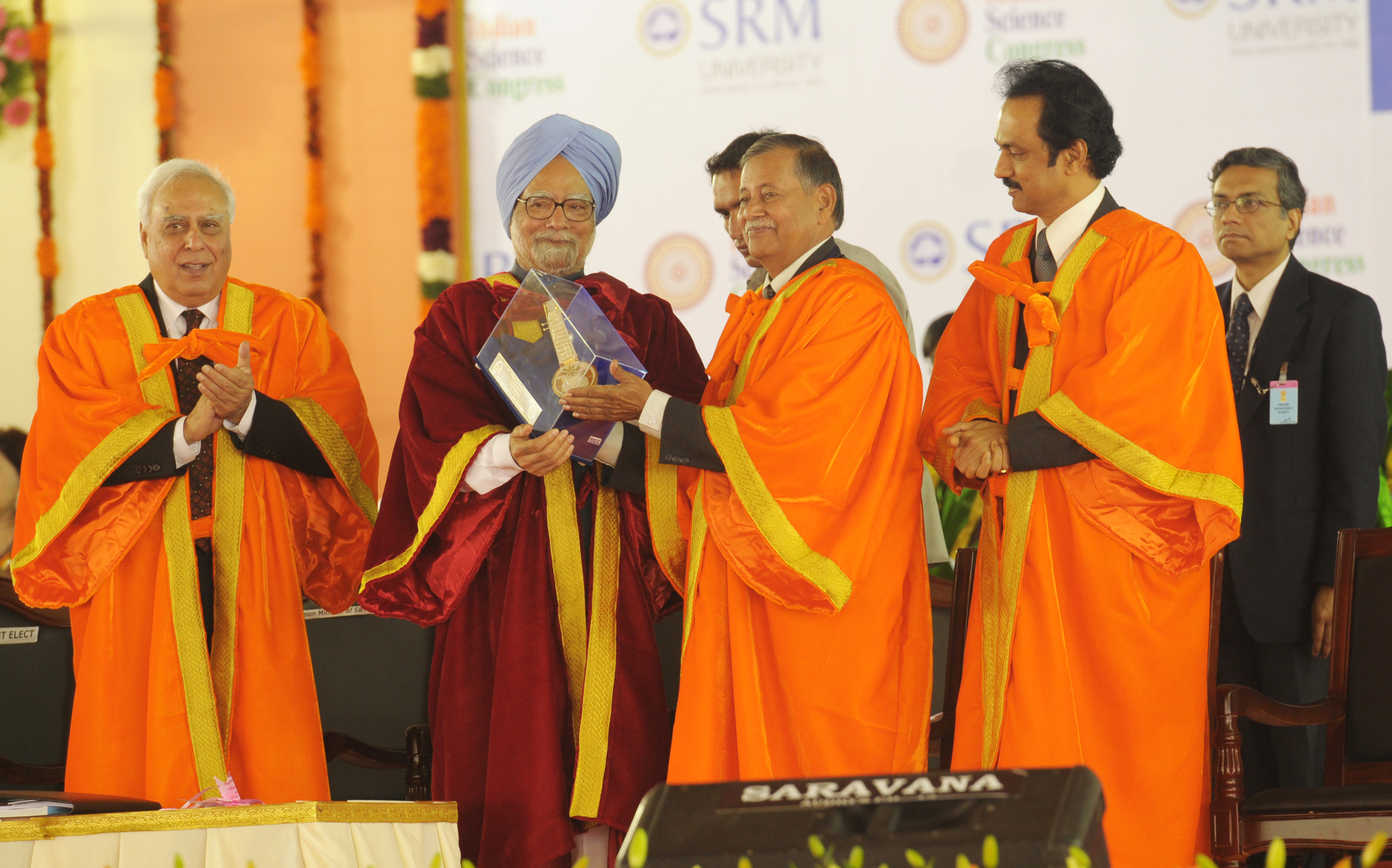
Prime Minister Manmohan Singh being presented a memento by the President of ISCA, Prof. K.C. Pandey, at the inauguration of the 98th Indian Science Congress, in Chennai on 3 January 2011

The five-day-long session, from 3 to 7 January 2011, at the Campus of SRM Institute of Science and Technology, Chennai was inaugurated by Prime Minister Manmohan Singh on 3 January 2011. The focal theme of this session was: "Quality education and excellence in scientific research in Indian universities". The prime minister said: "The Indian scientific community must apply its research findings and translate them into marketable products for the country to realize the true benefits of scientific progress. At the same time, he cautioned on "illiberal" uses of technology and cited use of nuclear weapons, applications of synthetic chemistry in agriculture and in poison gases and "perverse use" of genetics in Nazi Germany to drive home his point.

Nobel laureates Amartya Sen, Venkatraman Ramakrishnan, Ada Yonath, Thomas A. Steitz, Tim Hunt and Martin Chalfie delivered special lectures at the congress. Venkata Ramakrishnan inaugurated the parallel Children's Science Congress on Tuesday, 4 January 2011.

=== 99th edition ===
The five-day, 99th edition of the ISCA, from 3 to 7 January 2012 was hosted by KIIT University and National Institute of Science Education and Research (NISER) in Bhubaneswar, Orissa. It saw the participation of more than 15,000 delegates, which included 500 foreign scientists and 20 Nobel laureates. It was inaugurated by the incumbent Prime Minister of India, Manmohan Singh. On its sidelines, the first Women's Science Congress was inaugurated by Nirupama Rao, India's ambassador to United States of America and the Children's Science Congress was inaugurated by the former President of India, A. P. J. Abdul Kalam.

=== Centenary edition ===
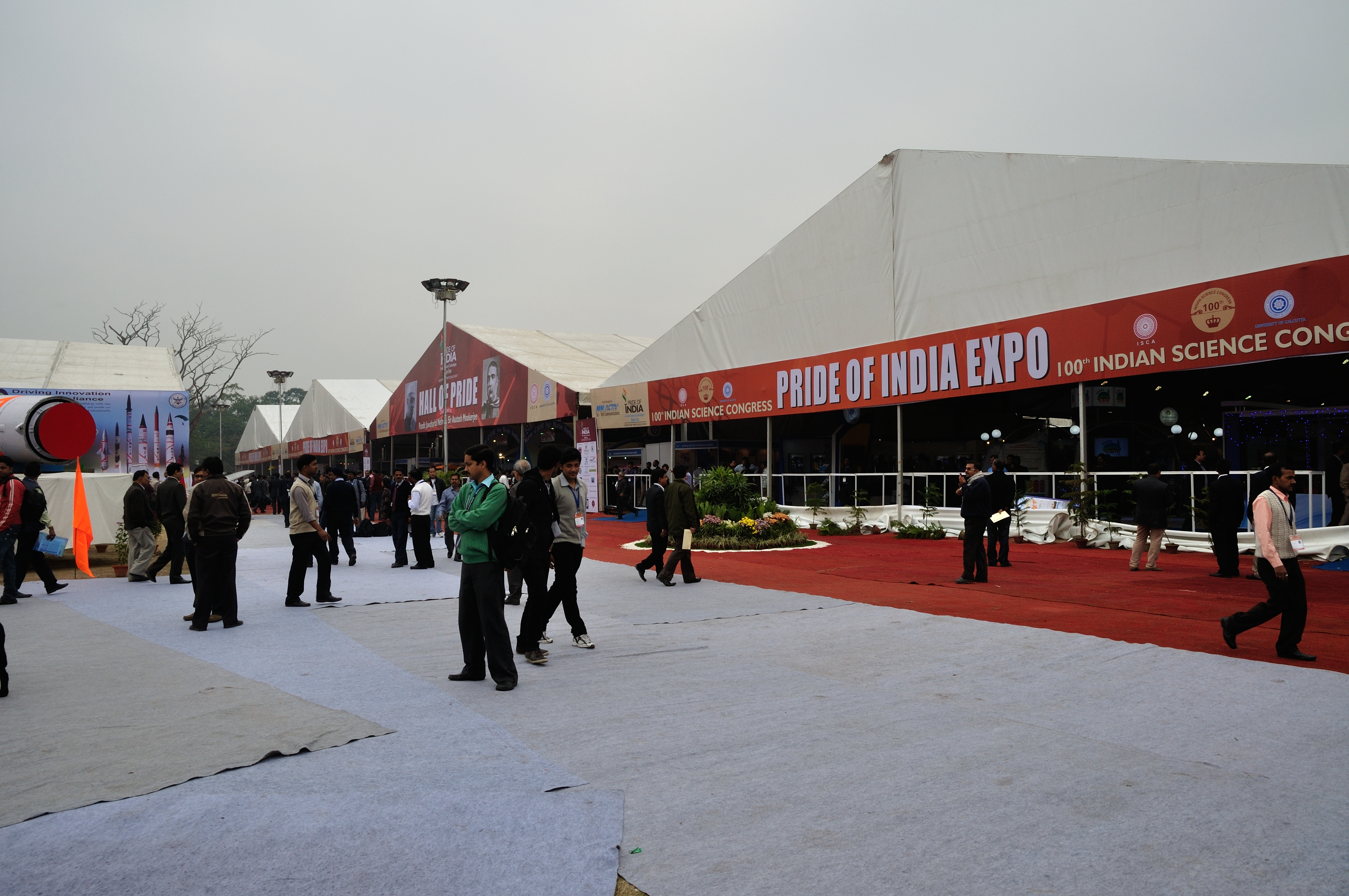
'Pride of India' an exhibition also organised as a part of the centenary edition in Kolkata.

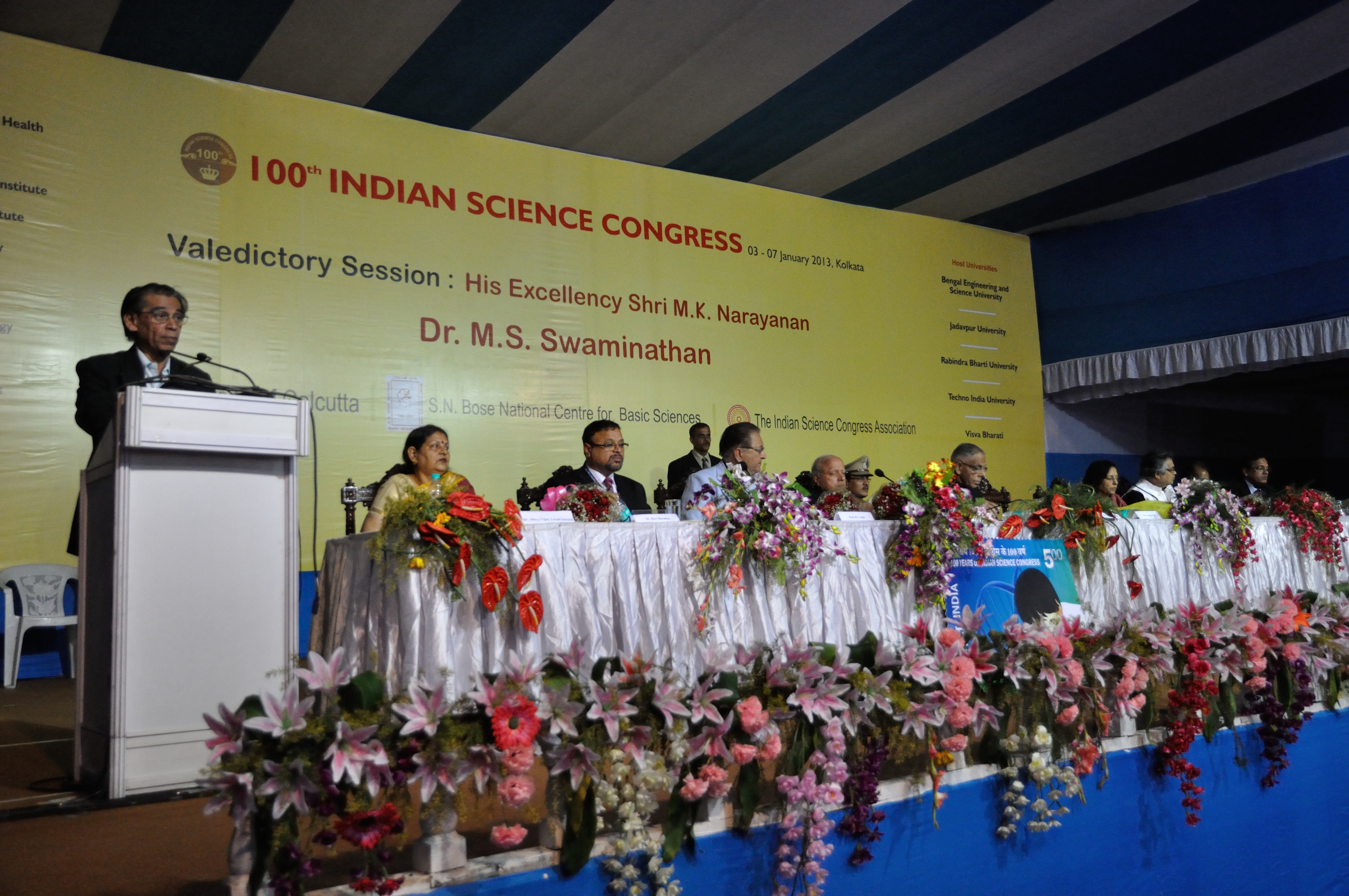
Valedictory Session of the 100th Indian Science Congress in Kolkata.

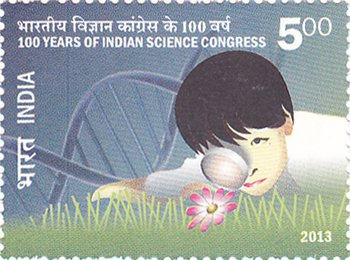
100 years of the organisation postal stamp

The 100th edition was hosted by the University of Calcutta which is in the city of Kolkata from 3 to 7 January 2013. The theme of the Centenary Congress was, "Science for shaping the future of India". It was inaugurated by the former President of India Pranab Mukherjee in the presence of the former Prime Minister of India Dr.Manmohan Singh and the incumbent Chief Minister of West Bengal Mamata Banerjee.

=== 101st edition ===
The 101st edition of Indian Science Congress was held in Jammu starting from 3 February 2014 to 8 February.

=== 102nd edition ===
The 102nd edition of Indian Science Congress was held in Mumbai from 3 January 2015 to 7 January 2015. It was inaugurated by Prime Minister Narendra Modi in Mumbai University. Studies and papers on Ancient Indian Vedas were presented in this Congress. Accomplishments of Ancient Indian Science in the fields of medicine, mathematics, surgery etc. were presented. There was also a session on India's successful Mars Orbiter Mission.

=== 104th edition ===
The 104th edition of Indian Science Congress was held in Tirupati in January (3rd to 7th) 2017. It was inaugurated by Prime Minister Narendra Modi in Sri Venkateswara University.

=== 106th edition ===
The 106th edition of Indian Science Congress was held in Punjab from 3–7 January 2019. It was inaugurated by Narendra Modi and hosted around 30,000 scientists, including six Nobel laureates. It became known for controversial talks purporting, among other claims, that Newton's and Einstein's theories of gravity were wrong, and that gravitational waves should be renamed to "Narendra Modi waves"; that the demon-king Ravana had 24 types of aircraft and a network of airports in modern-day Sri Lanka; that ancient Indians knew of in vitro fertilization; that Brahma invented dinosaurs; and that Lord Vishnu had heat-seeking missiles.

Kamala Thiagarajan alleged that under the Bharatiya Janata Party, several scientists took part to push the views and ideals of Rashtriya Swayamsevak Sangh, a right-wing Hindu nationalist organization, into the mainstream. After the 106th Congress and several similar incidents over the previous few years, the Indian Science Congress established a policy that requires speakers at future conferences to be vetted and scrutinizes the content of their talks.

== Sections, committees and forums of ISCA ==
From a modest beginning of only hundred and five members, ISCA has grown into a strong fraternity with more than ten thousand members as of 2012. Only thirty-five papers were presented at the first Congress, a number that has risen to nearly one thousand.

In 2000, there were sixteen sections: Agricultural Science; Anthropology & Archaeology; Biochemistry, Biophysics & Molecular Biology; Botany; Chemistry; Computer science; Earth system science; Engineering science; Material science; Mathematics; Medical & Veterinary sciences; Physics; Physiology; Psychology & Educational Science; Statistics; and Zoology, Entomology & Fisheries. There were also two committees: Home science and Science & Society. Finally, there were also six forums: Communication & Information sciences; Environmental science; Forensic science; Science education; Science for school students; and Women & science.

There are now fourteen sections, including Agriculture and Forestry sciences; Animal, Veterinary and Fishery sciences; Anthropological and Behavioral sciences (including Archaeology and Psychology & Educational sciences); Chemical science; Earth system science; Engineering science; Environmental science; Information and Communication science & technology (including Computer science); Material science; Mathematical science (including Statistics); Medical science (including Physiology); New Biology (including Biochemistry, Biophysics & Molecular Biology; and Biotechnology); Physical science; and Plant science.

== Interaction with foreign scientific academies/associations ==
After independence ISCA has been actively represented in various foreign scientific academies/associations, namely British Association for the Advancement of Science, American Association for the Advancement of Science, French Academy of Sciences, Bangladesh Academy of Sciences, Sri Lanka Association for the Advancement of Science, etc. with a view to have a first hand knowledge on topics of mutual interest.

== Conflict within the Indian science system ==
Corruption in India is a major problem and the science sector is no exception. ISCA has served as a platform to discuss the issues facing Indian scientists, with some calling for transparency, a meritocratic system, and an overhaul of the bureaucratic agencies that oversee science and technology. In her commentary on the centenary session of ISCA, Sumit Bhaduri stated, "[t]he challenges of turning Indian science into part of an innovation process are many. … Many competent Indian scientists aspire to be ineffectual administrators [due to administrative power and political patronage], rather than do the kind of science that makes a difference". Prime minister Manmohan Singh spoke at the 99th Indian Science Congress and commented on the state of the sciences in India, after an advisory council informed him there were problems with "the overall environment for innovation and creative work" and a 'warlike' approach was needed.

== Sessions of Indian Science Congress ==
Session	Year	Place	General President	Title/Theme
1st	1914	Kolkata	Ashutosh Mukherjee	About Science Congress
2nd	1915	Chennai	William Burney Bannerman	The importance of knowledge of biology of medical, sanitary and scientific men working in the tropics
3rd	1916	Lucknow	Sidney Gerald Burrard	The plains of northern India and their relationship to the Himalayan mountains
4th	1917	Bengaluru	Alfred Gibbs Bourne	On scientific research
5th	1918	Lahore	Gilbert T. Walker	On teaching of science
6th	1919	Mumbai	Leonard Rogers	Researches on cholera
7th	1920	Nagpur	Prafulla Chandra Roy	Dawn of science in modern India
8th	1921	Kolkata	Rajendranath Mookerjee	On science and industry
9th	1922	Chennai	Charles Stewart Middlemiss	Relativity
10th	1923	Lucknow	M. Visvesvaraya	Scientific institutions and scientists
11th	1924	Bengaluru	N. Annandale	Evolution convergent and divergent
12th	1925	Varanasi	M. O. Forster	On experimental training
13th	1926	Mumbai	Albert Howard	Agriculture and science
14th	1927	Lahore	J. C. Bose	Unity of life
15th	1928	Kolkata	J. L. Simonsen	On chemistry of natural products
16th	1929	Chennai	C. V. Raman	On Raman Effect
17th	1930	Allahabad	C. S. Christopher	The science and disease
18th	1931	Nagpur	R. B. Seymour Sewell	The problem of evolution experimental modification of bodily structure
19th	1932	Bengaluru	Shiv Ram Kashyap	Some aspects of the Alpine vegetation of the Himalaya and Tibet
20th	1933	Patna	Lewis L. Fermor	The place of geology in the life of a nation
21st	1934	Mumbai	Meghnad Saha	Fundamental cosmological problems
22nd	1935	Kolkata	J. H. Hutton	Anthropology and India
23rd	1936	Indore	U. N. Brahmachari	The Role of science in the recent progress of medicine
24th	1937	Hyderabad	T. S. Venkataraman	The Indian village – its past, present and future
25th	1938	Kolkata	James Jeans (Lord Rutherford of Nelson died prematurely)	Researches in India and in Great Britain
26th	1939	Lahore	J. C. Ghosh	On research in Chemistry in India
27th	1940	Chennai	Birbal Sahni	The Deccan Traps: an episode of the Tertiary era
28th	1941	Varanasi	Ardeshir Dalal	Science and industry
29th	1942	Vadodara	D. N. Wadia	The making of India
30th	1943	Kolkata	D. N. Wadia	Minerals' share in the war
31st	1944	Delhi	S. N. Bose	The Classical Determinism and the Quantum Theory
32nd	1945	Nagpur	Shanti Swarup Bhatnagar	Give science a chance
33rd	1946	Bengaluru	M. Afzal Hussain	The food problem of India
34th	1947	Delhi	Jawaharlal Nehru	Science in the service of the nation
35th	1948	Patna	Ram Nath Chopra	Rationalisation of medicine in India
36th	1949	Allahabad	K. S. Krishnan	
37th	1950	Pune	P. C. Mahalanobis	Role of Science in Statistics & Planning
38th	1951	Bengaluru	H. J. Bhabha	The present concept of the physical world
39th	1952	Kolkata	J. N. Mukherjee	Science and our problems
40th	1953	Lucknow	D. M. Bose	The living and the non-living
41st	1954	Hyderabad	S. L. Hora	Give scientists a chance
42nd	1955	Vadodara	S. K. Mitra	Science and progress
43rd	1956	Agra	M. S. Krishnan	Mineral resources and their problems
44th	1957	Kolkata	B. C. Roy	On science for human welfare and development of the country
45th	1958	Chennai	M. S. Thacker	Grammar of scientific development
46th	1959	Delhi	A. L. Mudaliar	Tribute to basic sciences
47th	1960	Mumbai	P. Parija	Impact of society on science
48th	1961	Roorkee	N. R. Dhar	Nitrogen problem
49th	1962	Cuttack	B. Mukherji	Impact of life sciences on man
50th	1963	Delhi	D. S. Kothari	Science and the universities
51st	1964	Kolkata	Humayun Kabir	Science and the state
52nd	1965	Kolkata	Humayun Kabir	
53rd	1966	Chandigarh	B. N. Prasad	Science in India
54th	1967	Hyderabad	T. R. Seshadri	Science and national welfare
55th	1968	Varanasi	Atma Ram	Science in India – some aspects
56th	1969	Mumbai	A. C. Joshi (A. C. Banerjee died prematurely)	A breathing spell:plant sciences in the service of man
57th	1970	Kharagpur	L. C. Verman	Standardization: a triple point
58th	1971	Bengaluru	B. P. Pal	Agricultural science and human welfare
59th	1972	Kolkata	W. D. West	Geology in the service of India
60th	1973	Chandigarh	S. Bhagavantam	Sixty years of science in India
61st	1974	Nagpur	R. S. Mishra	Mathematics – queen or handmaid
62nd	1975	Delhi	Asima Chatterjee (the first lady scientist to be elected as the General President)	Science and technology in India: present and future
63rd	1976	Visakhapatnam	M. S. Swaminathan	Science and integrated rural development
64th	1977	Bhubaneswar	H. N. Sethna	Survey, conservation and utilisation of resources
65th	1978	Ahmedabad	S. M. Sircar	Science, education and rural development
66th	1979	Hyderabad	R. C. Mehrotra	Science and technology in India during the coming decades
67th	1980	Jadavpur	A. K. Saha	Energy strategies for India
68th	1981	Varanasi	A. K. Sharma	Impact of development of science and technology on environment
69th	1982	Mysuru	M. G. K. Menon	Basic Research as an integral component of self-reliant base of science and technology
70th	1983	Tirupati	Barry Ramachandra Rao	Man and the ocean – resource and development
71st	1984	Ranchi	R. P. Bambah	Quality science in India – ends and means
72nd	1985	Lucknow	A. S. Paintal	High altitude studies
73rd	1986	Delhi	T. N. Khoshoo	Role of science and technology in environment management
74th	1987	Bengaluru	Archana Sharma	Resources and human well-being-inputs from science and technology
75th	1988	Pune	C. N. R. Rao	Frontiers in science and technology
76th	1989	Madurai	A. P. Mitra	Science and technology in India:technology missions
77th	1990	Kochi	Yash Pal	Science in society
78th	1991	Indore	D. K. Sinha	Coping with natural disaster: an integrated approach
79th	1992	Vadodara	Vasant Gowarikar	Science, population and development
80th	1993	Goa	S. Z. Qasim	Science and quality of life
81st	1994	Jaipur	P. N. Shrivastava	Science in India: excellence and accountability
82nd	1995	Kolkata	S. C. Pakrashi	Science, technology and industrial development of India
83rd	1996	Patiala	U. R. Rao	Science and technology for achieving food, economic and healthy security
84th	1997	Delhi	S. K. Joshi	Frontiers in science and engineering, and their relevance to national development
85th	1998	Hyderabad	P. Rama Rao	Science & Technology in Independent India : Retrospect and Prospect
86th	1999	Chennai	Manju Sharma	New bioscience: opportunities and challenges as we move into the next millennium
87th	2000	Pune	R. A. Mashelkar	Indian science and technology into the next millennium
88th	2001	Delhi	R. S. Paroda	Food, nutrition and environmental security
89th	2002	Lucknow	S. K. Katiyar	Health care, education and information technology
90th	2003	Bengaluru	K. Kasturirangan	Frontiers of science and cutting-edge technologies
91st	2004	Chandigarh	Asis Datta	Science and society in the twenty first century : quest for excellence
92nd	2005	Ahmedabad	N. K. Ganguly	Health technology as fulcrum of development for the nation
93rd	2006	Hyderabad	I. V. Subba Rao	Integrated rural development: science and technology
94th	2007	Annamalainagar (Annamalai University)	Harsh Gupta	Planet Earth
95th	2008	Visakhapatnam	Ramamurthi Rallapalli	Knowledge Based Society Using Environmentally Sustainable Science And Technology
96th	2009	Shillong	T. Ramasami	Science Education and Attraction of Talent for Excellence in Research
97th	2010	Thiruvananthapuram.	G. Madhavan Nair	Science & Technology of 21st Century – National Perspective
98th	2011	Chennai (SRM Institute of Science and Technology)	K. C. Pandey	Quality education and excellence in science research in Indian Universities.
99th	2012	Bhubaneshwar	Geetha Bali	Science And Technology for Inclusive Innovation- Role of Women
100th	2013	Kolkata	Prime Minister Manmohan Singh	Science for shaping the future of India
101st	2014	Jammu	Ranbir Chander Sobti	Innovations in Science & Technology for Inclusive Development
102nd	2015	Mumbai	Sarjerao Bhaurao Nimse	Science and Technology for Human Development
103rd	2016	Mysuru	Ashok Kumar Saxena	Science and Technology for Indigenous Development in India
104th	2017	Tirupati (Sri Venkateswara University)	D.Narayana Rao	Science & technology for national development
105th	2018	Imphal (Manipur University)	Dr. Achyuta Samanta	Reaching the unreached through science and technology
106th	2019	Jalandhar (Lovely Professional University)	Dr. Manoj Chakrabarti	FUTURE INDIA – Science and Technology
107th	2020	Bangaluru (UAS)	Prof. K. S. Rangappa	Focal Theme - Science & Technology : Rural Development
108th	2023	Nagpur (Rashtrasant Tukadoji Maharaj Nagpur University)	Dr. Vijay Laxmi Saxena	Focal Theme - Science and Technology for Sustainable Development with Women Empowerment

== See also ==
- Kerala Science Congress
- National Space Olympiad
- India International Science Festival
