= Sourindra Mohan Sircar =

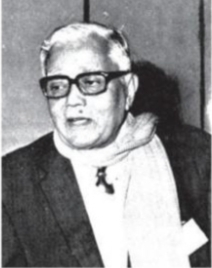
- Born: March 1, 1908; Paikpara village , Krishnaganj, Nadia, British India
- Died: February 21, 1978 (aged 69); Kolkata, West Bengal, India
- Education: University of Calcutta, Imperial College of Science and Technology, London
- Occupation: Botanist

Sourindra Mohan Sircar (1908-1978) was one of the greatest botanists of India, specializing in plant physiology and anatomy.

== Birth and early life ==
Sourindra Mohan Sircar was born in a Bengali Mahishya family of Paikpara village, Nadia district on March 1, 1908. His father was Gourkrishna Sircar and mother Kusumkamini Debi. Sourindra was the youngest of seven siblings. He studied in Krishnagar CMS School and Alamdanga High School. Then he obtained a bachelor of science in Botany from Presidency College and a masters in Botany from the University of Calcutta. He moved to UK to do his doctoral study.

== Career ==
Sircar worked with Professor F. G. Gregory at the Imperial College of Science and Technology (London), on the relationship between respiration and nitrogen metabolism in potato tuber. He returned to India and was professor of department of Botany at Calcutta University between 1937–45 and 1947–49. He then took over as Acting Head of the Department of Biology at Dacca University (1945–47) before a brief stay at the Central College of Agriculture at IARI, 1949-51 (then affiliated to Delhi University).

Sircar again returned to Calcutta in 1951 and later became the Head of the Botany Department of Calcutta University, 1960–65. Toward the later part of his career, he became the Director of the Bose Institute, 1967–75.

He founded the school of Plant Physiology, which has made significant contributions to plant science research and teaching in India.

Sircar was elected as a fellow of German Academy of Natural Scientists in 1974.

== General Presidents of ISCA ==
He was appointed the General President of Indian Science Congress Association from 1977 to 78, which is a professional body under the Ministry of Science and Technology. Before that he had been the general secretary of ISCA between 1973 and 1976.

== Work ==
He was one of the pioneers of plant physiological research in India. His work was centered around the indica cultivars f rice plants. The discoveries of germination and growth inhibitors, as also isolation of new gibberellins were remarkable contributions. His contributions on nutrition, lodging and the relationship between translocation, photosynthesis and yield of rice paved the way for understanding the lower yield potential of rice varieties. Double cropping of rice was his important contribution, which has found practical applications. The integration of physiological phenomena characterized his research activities.

Sircar and his students and assisted by his son P. K. Sircar, were among the first to embark on isolation and identification of plant growth substances (gibberellins and cytokinins) from plants growing in and around Calcutta, including mangrove plants. They managed to extract a novel gibberellin type from a mangrove plant, of the Sonneratia apetala species. His team investigated the basic and applied problems related to rice such as anatomical changes in the growing point accompanying a transition from the vegetative to the reproductive state, germination and viability of rice varieties, and their mineral nutrition, photoperiodism and vernalization.

His other interests included biochemical changes in rice and mungbean seed germination and their control mechanism.

In 1971, he published his book Plant Hormone Research in India, ICAR, New Delhi.
