= Dipan Ghosh =

Indian theoretical physicist

Dipan Kumar Ghosh
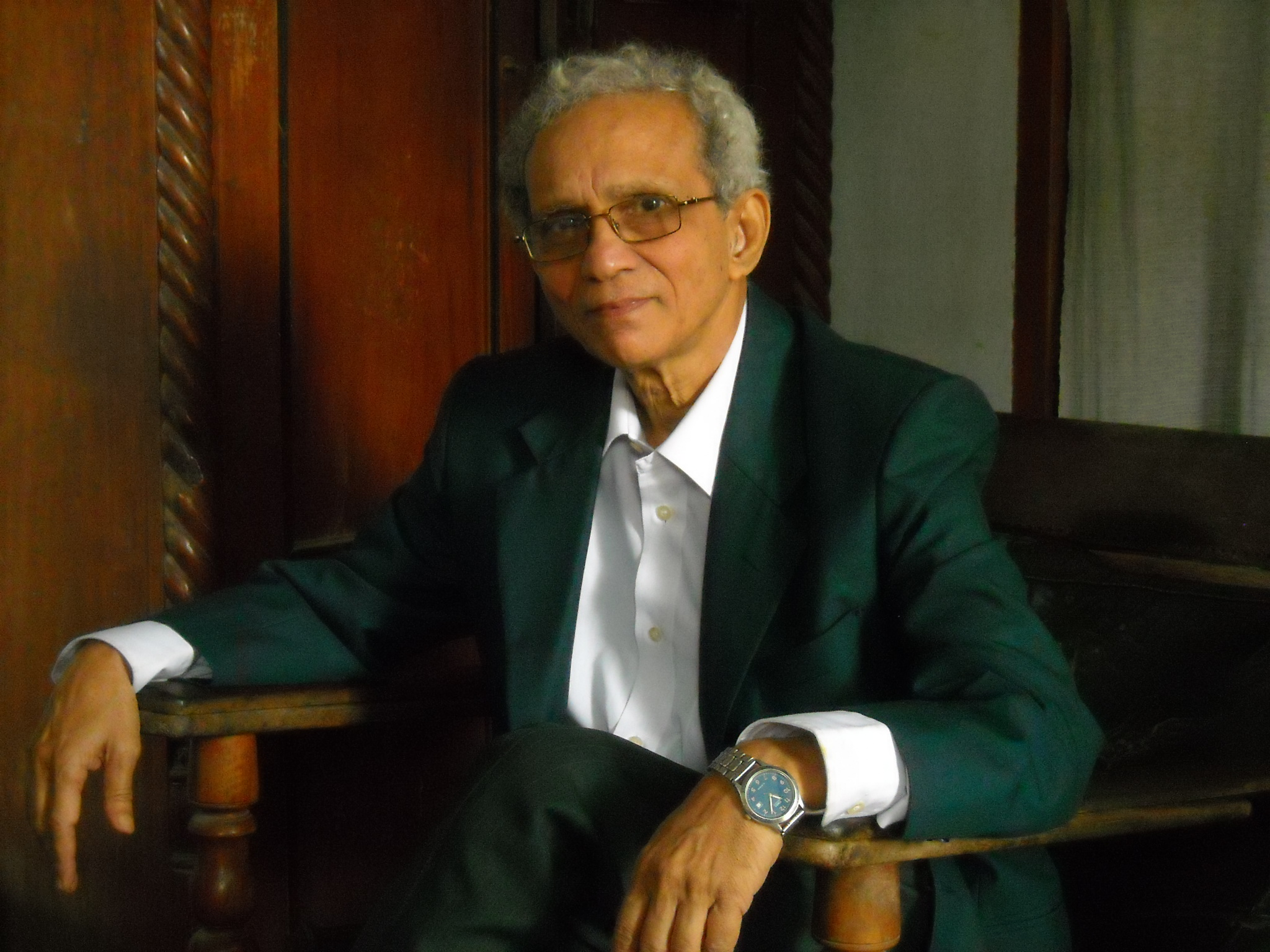
- Education: Tata Institute of Fundamental Research
- Known for: Majumdar–Ghosh model
- Scientific career
- Fields: Condensed matter theory
- Workplaces: Indian Institute of Technology, Bombay
- Doctoral advisor: Chanchal Kumar Majumdar

Dipan Ghosh is an Indian theoretical physicist, best known for his exact enumeration of the ground state of a Heisenberg antiferromagnet, known in literature as the Majumdar–Ghosh model, which he developed with Chanchal Kumar Majumdar.

== Education ==
Ghosh was awarded an M.Sc. in physics in 1966 from Ravenshaw College, Cuttack Utkal University, as that university's gold medalist. He would later receive his Ph.D. from the Tata Institute of Fundamental Research, Bombay, India in 1971 on the strength of his thesis, entitled "Study of Magnetic Hamiltonians", under Chanchal Kumar Majumdar. He did post-doctoral work at Bristol University with John Ziman from 1971 to 1972, and at Northwestern University with K. S. Singwi from 1972–73.

== Occupation ==
- He was the deputy director of the Indian Institute of Technology, Bombay from 2005 to 2006, and was the president of the Indian Physics Association from 2005 to 2007.
- He held appointments at the University of California, Santa Cruz and at Visva Bharati University, before joining IIT Bombay in 1974.
- He is currently Professor Emeritus at IIT Bombay.
