= Lal Chand Verman =

Indian physicist (1902–1979)

- Born: Lal Chand Ahuja; 3 September 1902; Amritsar, Punjab
- Died: 21 October 1979 (aged 77)
- Known for: industrial standardization
- Awards: Padma Shri; 1967

Academic background
- Education: University of Michigan; Cornell University

Academic work
- Notable works: Metric Change in India (1970); Standardization: A New Discipline (1973)

Lal Chand Verman (3 September 1902 – 21 October 1979) was an Indian physicist and a pioneer in industrial standardization. He served as the first Director-General of the Indian Standards Institution and was instrumental in establishing the framework for standardization in India.

== Early life and education ==
Lal Chand Verman was born on 3 September 1902 in Amritsar, Punjab. He earned a Bachelor of Science in Electrical Engineering with Honours from the University of Michigan in 1927. In 1926, he was elected as a member of the Tau Beta Pi, a scholastic engineering fraternity. He then attended Cornell University, where he conducted research on ionospheric phenomena and radio wave propagation, obtaining his Master of Science in 1928 and Ph.D. in 1930.

== Career ==
=== Early career ===
In 1931–1933, Verman served as a Research Fellow at the Indian Institute of Science, Bangalore. He then worked at the Shellac Research Institute in Teddington, Middlesex, from 1933 to 1935. In 1936, Verman was appointed Research Officer at the Industrial Intelligence and Research Bureau of the Indian Stores Department. With the establishment of the Board of Scientific and Industrial Research (BSIR) in 1940, which later evolved into the Council of Scientific and Industrial Research in 1942, the Research Bureau was integrated into the Board. In 1940, Verman was promoted to Assistant Director at BSIR. By 1944, he had become the Acting Director of the newly established National Physical Laboratory in Delhi.

=== Indian Standards Institution ===
On 3 September 1946, the Interim Government of India passed its first resolution establishing the Indian Standards Institution as the National Standards Body. One of its objectives was to recommend national standards for measurements. In June 1947, Verman was appointed Director of the Indian Standards Institution. He later became its Director-General, a role he held until 1966.

Verman undertook a comprehensive study of the issue and prepared a report advocating the adoption of the metric system, incorporating Indian nomenclature for basic units and fractions. His report, submitted before India's independence on 15 August 1947, was later published in the Indian Standards Bulletin in January 1949. Verman also prepared a report on decimalized coinage, aligning dimensions and weights with the metric system. Both reports were reviewed by the Engineering Division Council (EDC) of ISI, which recommended their adoption to the Government of India.

In May 1948, a special committee chaired by Jnan Chandra Ghosh, Director-General of Supplies and Disposals, was formed to evaluate the metric system's adoption. The committee included representatives from central ministries, state governments, scientific bodies, and industrial organizations.

Despite resistance from various stakeholders and concerns about costs and timing, Verman persisted in advocating for the metric system. In 1954, he presented his arguments to Pitamber Pant, then Private Secretary to the Chairman of the Planning Commission. The Planning Commission decided to undertake a comprehensive study, marking a significant step toward the metric system's eventual adoption.

=== Further contributions ===
Verman acted as an Honorary Adviser to the Government of India on standardization from 1951 to 1970. Verman was a founding member of the Institution of Electronics and Telecommunication Engineers (IETE). After retiring from ISI, Verman continued to contribute to the field of standardization. From 1966 to 1967, he served as Chief Adviser to the Director-General of the Institute of Standard and Industrial Research in Tehran, Iran. Subsequently, he worked as a Senior Regional Adviser on Industrial Standardization for the United Nations Economic and Social Commission for Asia and the Far East (EGAFE) in Bangkok from 1967 to 1970. He assisted several countries, including Afghanistan, Algeria, Iran, Indonesia, Philippines, Singapore, and Thailand, in developing their national standardization programs. He also worked as a Senior Consultant to ISI between 1966 and 1969 and later as an industrial consultant. From 1974 to 1975, he led the USAID Project Team for the study of National Standards System of South Korea.

=== Positions ===
- Vice-president of the International Standards Organisation (ISO) for two consecutive terms (1949–54).
- President of the Indian Science Congress (1969–1970).
- President of the Institution of Telecommunications Engineers for two consecutive terms (1960–1962).
- Fellow of Standards Engineers' Society (USA).
- Fellow of the Institution of Physics (India).
- Fellow of the Indian National Science Academy (1946).
- Fellow of the Institution of Engineers (India).
- Honorary member of the American Society for Testing Materials (1968).

== Publications ==
Verman authored over 150 scientific papers and several books on standardization and industrial research, such as:

- Metric Change in India (1970)
- Standardization: A New Discipline (1973)
- National Standardization in Developing Countries: Organization and Administration Manual (UNIDO, 1974)

He has about 20 patents in areas including automatic voltage regulators and plastics molding techniques.

== Awards ==
- K. L. Moudgill Prize by the Indian Standards Institution (1958).
- Leo B. Moore Prize by the Standards Engineers' Society, USA (1964).
- Sir Walter Puckey Prize by the Institution of Production Engineers, UK (1967).
- Padma Shri by the Government of India (1967).
- Standards Personality of the Month by the American National Standards Institute in 1966.

== Death ==
Verman died on 21 October 1979 after a brief illness. In his honor, the Institution of Electronics and Telecommunication Engineers (IETE) instituted the Lal C. Verman Award in 1983, recognizing excellence in standardization and quality control.
