= India International Science Festival =

India International Science Festival (IISF) is an initiative of the Ministry of Science and Technology and Ministry of Earth Science of the Government of India in association with India's Science movement Vijnana Bharati with Swadeshi spirit led by eminent scientists of India. This platform brings together students, the public, researchers, innovators and artists from around the globe to experience the joy of doing science for the well-being of people and humanity.

== Festival Celebration ==
The first IISF was celebrated in New Delhi in 2015. The festival theme of 2021 was "Celebrating Creativity in Science, Technology and Innovation for Prosperous India", which was held between 11 December 2021 and 13 December 2021 at Panaji, Goa, India.

== See also ==
- Indian Science Congress Association
- Ministry of Science and Technology (India)
