= Magnetic Thermodynamic Systems =

In thermodynamics and thermal physics, the theoretical formulation of magnetic systems entails expressing the behavior of the systems using the laws of thermodynamics. Common magnetic systems examined through the lens of thermodynamics are ferromagnets and paramagnets as well as the ferromagnet-to-paramagnet phase transition. It is also possible to derive thermodynamic quantities in a generalized form for an arbitrary magnetic system using the formulation of magnetic work.

Simplified thermodynamic models of magnetic systems include the Ising model, the mean field approximation, and the ferromagnet-to-paramagnet phase transition expressed using the Landau theory.

== Arbitrary magnetic systems ==
In order to incorporate magnetic systems into the first law of thermodynamics, it is necessary to formulate the concept of magnetic work. The magnetic contribution to the quasi-static work done by an arbitrary magnetic system is

$$W=-\frac{1}{4\pi}{\int_{V}{H\cdot\Delta BdV}}$$

where $H$ is the magnetic field and $B$ is the magnetic flux density. So the first law of thermodynamics in a reversible process can be expressed as

$$\Delta U={\int_{S}{T dS}}-{\int_{V}{PdV}}+\frac{1}{4\pi}{\int_{V}{H\cdot\Delta BdV}}$$

Accordingly the change during a quasi-static process in the Helmholtz free energy, $F$, and the Gibbs free energy, $G$, will be

$$\Delta F=-{\int_{T}SdT}-{\int_{V}PdV}+\frac{1}{4\pi}{\int_{V}{H\cdot\Delta BdV}}$$
$$\Delta G=-{\int_{T}SdT}+{\int_{P}VdP}-\frac{1}{4\pi}{\int_{V}{B\cdot\Delta HdV}}$$

== Paramagnetic systems ==
In a paramagnetic system, that is, a system in which the magnetization vanishes without the influence of an external magnetic field, assuming some simplifying assumptions (such as the sample system being ellipsoidal), one can derive a few compact thermodynamic relations. Assuming the external magnetic field is uniform and shares a common axis with the paramagnet, the extensive parameter characterizing the magnetic state is $I$, the magnetic dipole moment of the system. The fundamental thermodynamic relation describing the system will then be of the form $U=U(S,V,I,N)$. In the more general case where the paramagnet does not share an axis with the magnetic field, the extensive parameters characterizing the magnetic state will be $I_x,I_y,I_z$. In this case, the fundamental relation describing the system will be $U=U(S,V,I_x,I_y,I_z,N)$.

The intensive parameter corresponding to the magnetic moment $I$ is the external magnetic field acting on the paramagnet, $B_e$. The relation between them is:

$$B_e = \left(\frac{\partial U}{\partial I}\right)_{S,V,N}$$

where $S$ is the Entropy, $V$ is the Volume and $N$ is the number of particles in the system. Note that in this case, $U$ is the energy added to the system by the insertion of the paramagnet. The total energy in the space occupied by the system includes a component arising from the energy of a magnetic field in a vacuum. This component equals $U_{vacuum}=\frac{B_e^2 V}{2\mu_0}$, where $\mu_0$ is the permeability of free space, and isn't included as a part of $U$. The choice if to include $U_{vacuum}$ in $U$ is arbitrary but important; it may lead to confusion emanating from differing results.

The Euler relation for a paramagnetic system is then:
$$U=TS-PV+B_{e}I+\mu N$$

and the Gibbs-Duhem relation for such a system is:
$$SdT-VdP+IdB_{e}+Nd\mu =0$$

An experimental problem that distinguishes magnetic systems from other thermodynamical systems is that the magnetic moment can't be constrained. Typically in thermodynamic systems, all extensive quantities describing the system can be constrained to a specified value. Examples are volume and the number of particles, which can both be constrained by enclosing the system in a box. On the other hand, there is no experimental method that can directly hold the magnetic moment to a specified constant value. Nevertheless, this experimental concern does not affect the thermodynamic theory of magnetic systems.

== Ferromagnetic systems ==
Ferromagnetic systems are systems in which the magnetization doesn't vanish in the absence of an external magnetic field. Multiple thermodynamic models have been developed in order to model and explain the behavior of ferromagnets, including the Ising model. The Ising model can be solved analytically in one and two dimensions, numerically in higher dimensions, or using the mean-field approximation in any dimensionality. Additionally, the ferromagnet to paramagnet phase transition is a second-order phase transition and so can be modeled using the Landau theory of phase transitions.

== See also ==
- Magnetism
- Thermodynamic systems
- Thermo-magnetic motor
