= K. S. Rangappa =

Indian academic

K. S. Rangappa FRSC
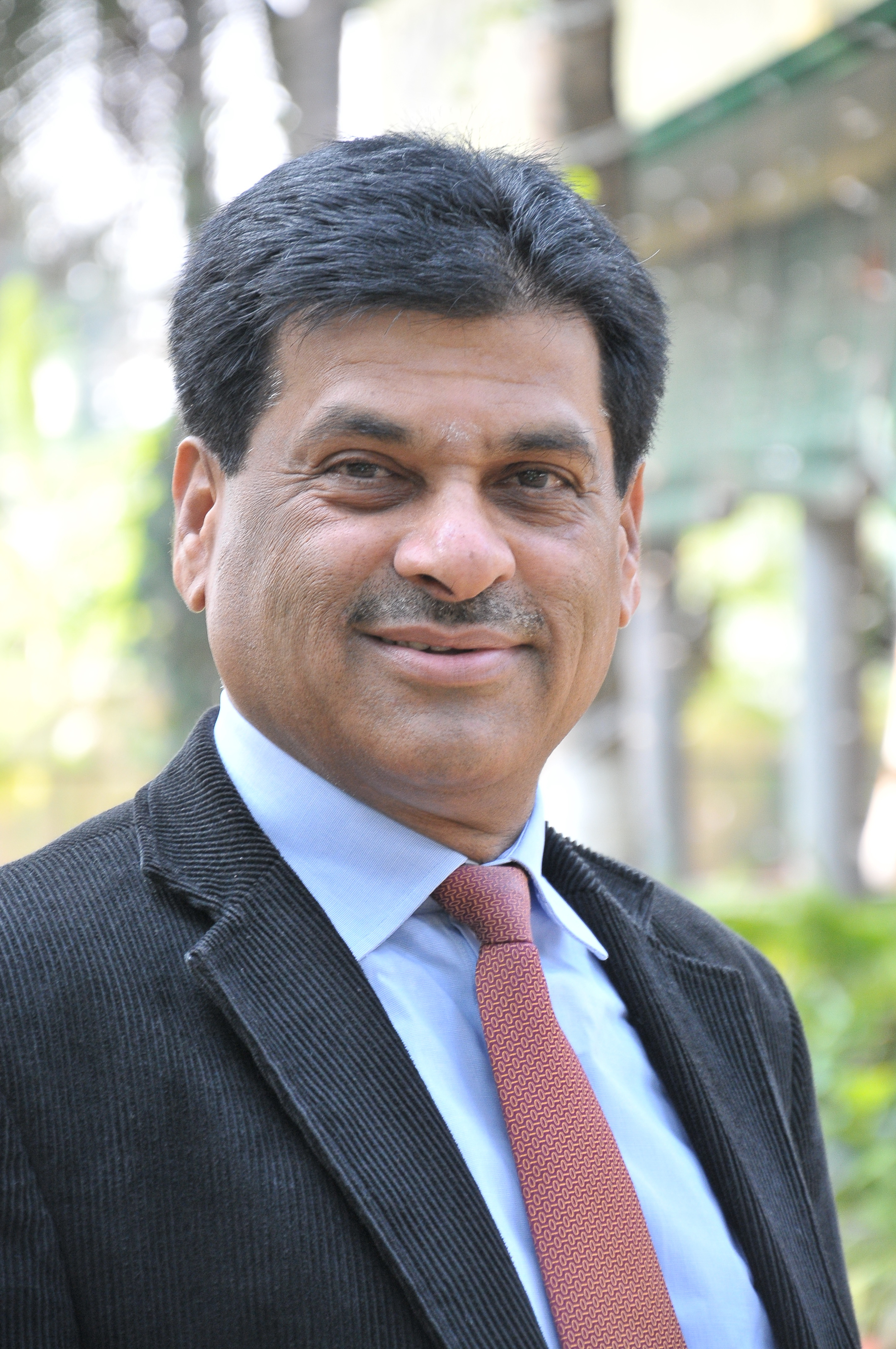
- Scientific career
- Fields: Chemistry
- Institutions: University of Mysore

Kanchugarakoppal S. Rangappa, known as K. S. Rangappa, is an Indian academic who served as the Vice Chancellor of both University of Mysore and Karnataka State Open University. Presently he is serving as General President, Indian Science Congress Association.

== Career ==
Rangappa served as Vice Chancellor of Karnataka State Open University from December 2009 to January 2013. He had also served as Vice Chancellor of University of Mysore from January 2013.

== Awards ==
Rangappa is the Fellow of Royal Society of Chemistry (London), Fellow of the National Academy of Sciences (India) and recipient of the Dr. Raja Ramanna Award for Scientists, and Chemical Research Society of India Bronze Medal. And he is also the recipient of a lifetime achievement award in the field of education at New Delhi in 2019.
