= Australian National Commission for UNESCO =

National commission for UNESCO of Australia

The Australian National Commission for UNESCO was established under Section 7 of the United Nations Educational, Scientific and Cultural Organization Act, 1947 (Cwlth) and is the Australian government organisation responsible for advising on the implementation of UNESCO policies and programmes in Australia and for advising on Australia's involvement with UNESCO. The Commission comprises a Secretariat and a total of seven (7) commissioners, along with two parliamentary representatives and a number of ex officio members. It is chaired by Kylie Walker, who is also CEO of Science & Technology Australia. It operates under the Charter of the Australian National Commission for UNESCO, a statutory instrument pursuant to Section 7 the above legislation. As peace education is fundamental to the mission of UNESCO, so too advising on the promotion and advancement of peace education in Australia is central to the role of the Australian National Commission for UNESCO.
