= Suri Bhagavantam =

Indian scientist (1909–1989)

- సూరి భగవంతం
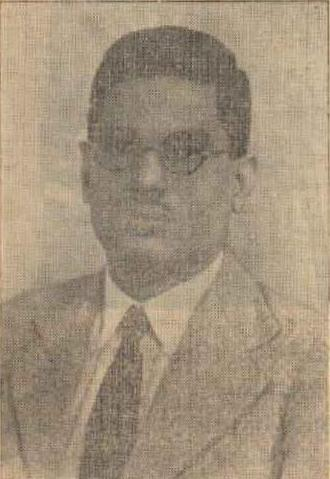
- Pro Suri Bhagavantam in 1941

2nd Director General of Defence research and development organisation
- In office 1961-1969
- Preceded by: Daulat Singh Kothari
- Succeeded by: Basanti Dulal Nag Chaudhuri

Personal details
- Born: 14 October 1909 Agiripalli, Madras Presidency, British Raj (now Andhra Pradesh, India)
- Died: 6 February 1989 (aged 79)

Academic background
- Education: Madras University

Suri Bhagavantam (Telugu: సూరి భగవంతం,; 14 October 1909 – 6 February 1989) was an Indian scientist and administrator. He was Vice chancellor of Osmania University and Director of Indian Institute of Science and Defence Research and Development Organisation.

== Early life ==
Bhagavantam was born in Agiripalli, a village in Andhra Pradesh. After primary education in Gudivada, he obtained a Bachelor of Science degree in physics from Nizam College, Hyderabad, under Madras University. Impressed by the discoveries of C. V. Raman, he relocated to Calcutta and joined him in 1928. After the Nobel Prize-winning discovery, Raman chose Bhagavantam as his collaborator to further his research work. He earned his master's degree in science from Madras University during this period.

When Raman joined the Indian Institute of Science as its director in 1933, he recommended Bhagavantam to join Andhra University, Waltair as lecturer in physics. During that period, he became a popular lecturer and rose to become a professor and head of the department in 1938 and Principal of University College in 1941. The university conferred on him the D.Sc. degree (honoris causa). He wrote the well known book titled The Theory of Groups and its Physical Applications along with Venkata Rayudu. This book was published in three editions and was translated into Russian. It is often said that a whole generation of spectroscopists are brought up on this book. The other book he wrote here is titled Scattering of Light and Raman Effect.

After Indian independence, he joined as scientific adviser to the Indian High Commission in London under V. K. Krishna Menon between 1948 and 1949. He travelled to many European countries and delivered scientific lectures.

He returned to India in 1949 and joined Osmania University as head of the Physics Department. During this period, there was a spurt in research activity and more than 12 Ph.D. students got their doctorates. He was chosen as vice chancellor in 1952.

In 1957, he became the Director of the Indian Institute of Science in Bangalore and served in that position for five years. He was appointed as the scientific adviser to the Government of India under the Ministry of Defence headed by Krishna Menon.

He joined as Director of the Defence Research and Development Organisation (DRDO) in 1962 after the Indo-Chinese War when Y B Chavan was the Defence Minister. He retired from the service in 1969.

His birth centenary celebrations were held at Osmania University in 2009.

== Positions held ==
- Principal of University College, Andhra University.
- Vice Chancellor, Osmania University in 1952.
- He was Director of Indian Institute of Science between 1957 and 1962.
- He was Director of Defence Research and Development Organisation in 1962
- He was president of the Current Science Association between 1970 and 1976.
