= Indian National Commission for Cooperation with UNESCO =

Indian National Commission for Cooperation with UNESCO is a governmental body formed by the Government of India which functions under the Department of Secondary and Higher Education in the Ministry of Human Resource Development. The objective of the commission is to advise the Government in matters relating to the United Nations Educational, Scientific and Cultural Organization (UNESCO).

== History ==
National Commissions for UNESCO are national organizations which are part of UNESCO and which are the only such bodies in the whole UN system. They were established under Article VII of the Constitution of the UNESCO by UNESCO member countries on a permanent basis and are associated with the government bodies of the member countries. Currently, there are 198 such National Commissions.

The Indian National Commission for Cooperation with UNESCO was established in 1951, when the constitution was approved. The establishment of the Commission followed two years (since 1949) of work of the interim National Commission. The Commission acts as a liaison between the Government of India and UNESCO.

== Structure of the commission ==
The National Commission consists of general assembly, secretariat (not to be confused with the organs of the United Nations), and five sub-commissions such as Education, Communications, Culture, Natural Sciences, and Social Sciences. The President of the commission is the Minister of Human Resource Development, and the Secretary General of the commission is the Secretary of the Department of Higher Education.
