= List of Charans =

Notable members of the Charan community

This is a list of notable people who belong to the Hindu Charan caste.

== Historical figures ==
- Alhaji Barhath, 14th-century poet, Warrior and trader known for sheltering and raising Rao Chunda of Mandor
- Haridas Kesaria (d. March 1527), 16th-century Mewar chieftain, warrior and poet
- Kaviraja Bankidas Ashiya (1771—1833), prolific writer and Kaviraja of Marwar during Maharaja Man Singh of Marwar; author of Bankidas ri Khyat
- Narharidas Barhath (1591—1676), renowned 17th-century poet and author of vaishnavite text Avatara Charitra
- Mahatma Barhath Isardas Rohadiya, 16th-century Hindu saint-poet known for devotion works including Harirasa and Deviyana; associated with several miracles and worshipped in both Gujarat and Rajasthan
- Barhath Kripa Ram Khidiya (1743—1833), 18th-century Rajasthani poet and writer, known for his verses on ethics called Rajiya ra Soratha
- Brahmanand Swami (aka Barhath Ladudan Ashiya) (1772—1832), revered as a saint-poet of the Swaminarayan Sampraday and a close friend of Sahajanand (Swaminarayan); noted for his brilliance in building multiple temples of the sect including Swaminarayan Mandir, Vadtal and Swaminarayan Mandir, Junagadh; authored scriptures for the sect collectively called 'Brahmanand Kavya', a copy of which is preserved in the British Museum in London.
- Mahamahopadhyaya Kaviraja Muraridan Ashiya (1830—1914), Diwan, Council Member, Judge of the Appellate Court, Officer of the Civil Court, General Superintendent, and the Magistrate of the princely state of Marwar; a renowned scholar, known for his prominent works including Yaśavaṃta-Yaśo-Bhūṣaṇa and Tawarikh Marwar
- Dursa Arha (1535—1655), 16th-century warrior and poet; highly regarded poet of the time, part of various courts including the Mughal court; known as 'First Nationalist Poet Of India' or Rashtrakavi, praising Rana Pratap in the Mughal Court
- Suryamal Misran (1815—1868), Kaviraja of Bundi kingdom, historian, poet and scholar of multiple languages including Dingala, Sanskrit, Prakrit, Pingal, Apabhraṃśa; author of the voluminous text of history Vansha Bhaskara, heroic poetry including Vir Satsai, Balwant Vilas and Chhandomayukh; one of the first nationalist poets actively campaigned against East India Company
- Kaviraja Shyamaldas Dadhivadia (1836—1893), Indian historian and author of Vir Vinod; Kaviraja and Dewan of Kingdom of Mewar
- Swami Swarupadas (aka Shankardan Detha) (1801—1863), a Dadupanthi saint-poet, religious teacher, and reformer; the guru of the rulers of Ratlam, Sailana and Sitamau States as well as of Suryamal Misran
- The Ratnu family of Sikar formed one such bureaucratic lineage whose members were Diwans of Sikar, Idar, Kishengarh, and Jhalawad States. Ramnathji Ratnu of Kishengarh

== Freedom fighters ==
- Thakur Kesari Singh Barhath (1872—1941), Indian revolutionary leader, freedom fighter, poet, writer and educator from Rajasthan
- Kunwar Pratap Singh Barhath (1893—1918), Indian revolutionary & anti-British activist, accomplice in the Delhi conspiracy case
- Thakur Zorawar Singh Barhath (1883—1939), Indian revolutionary and independence activist; main accomplice in the Delhi conspiracy case

== Modern figures ==
=== Litterateurs ===
- Chandra Prakash Deval, Rajasthani writer, critic and translator
- Vijaydan Detha (1926—2013), Rajasthani poet, writer and folklorist; author of 14-volume folklore collection Baatan Ri Phulwari, recipient of Padma Shree (2007) and Sahitya Akademi Award (1974)
- Dula Bhaya Kag (1903—1977), saint-poet and writer, mainly known for his work on spiritual poetry relating to Hinduism including his collection called Kagvani; facilitated with Padma Shri (1962)
- Shakti Dan Kaviya, poet, historian and writer
- Sitaram Lalas, linguist and lexicographer; creator and compiler of Rajasthani Sabadakosh, consisting of more than 200,000 words of Rajasthani vocabulary
- Pingalshi Meghanand Gadhvi (1914—1998), Gujarati folklorist, poet, writer and singer; received the Sangeet Natak Akademi award in 1990 for his contribution to the preservation and promotion of Gujarat's folklore and folk music
- Bhikhudan Gadhvi (b. 1948), Indian folk singer and songwriter, known as a proponent of Dayro
- Dadudan Gadhvi (Kavi Dad) (1940–2021), Gujarati poet, writer and folk singer; recipient of the Gujarat Gaurav Award, Jhaverchand Meghani Award, and Padma Shri in 2021 for his contribution in literature and education
- Kirtidan Gadhvi, Indian singer, known as a proponent of Dayro

=== Professionals ===
- Suryadev Singh Bareth, Indian advocate, poet, and social worker from Alwar; recipient of Padma Shri (1971) for his contributions to progressive agriculture in the region during Green Revolution
- Narayan Bareth, veteran Indian journalist and political analyst; former State Information Commissioner of Rajasthan (2020—2022) and Professor of Journalism at University of Rajasthan (2016—2017) and Haridev Joshi University of Journalism and Mass Communication (2013—2016)
- C. D. Arha, retired 1968-batch IAS officer from the Andhra Pradesh cadre who served as India's Secretary in the Ministry of Mines and Special Secretary in the Ministry of Coal. He later served as the first State Chief Information Commissioner of Andhra Pradesh and was associated with the Indus Foundation

=== Politicians ===
- Isudan Gadhvi is an Indian politician and senior Aam Aadmi Party (AAP) leader from Gujarat. Gadhvi was the State President of the Aam Aadmi Party in Gujarat and a member of its National Executive. Formerly working as a media professional, he exposed a Rs 1.50 billion scam of illegal deforestation in Dang and Kaparada talukas of Gujarat, editor of VTV News, anchor of his news show Mahamanthan at VTV Gujarati. He was the party's Chief Ministerial candidate in the 2022 Gujarat Legislative Assembly election
- Kesri Singh Mundiyar, author and politician associated with Swatantra Party and later Bharatiya Janata Party; scholar of Dingal, Rajasthani, and English and known for his poetry and translation work
- C D Deval, politician, Congress leader and former IAS officer from Rajasthan. He has served as the Member of Rajasthan Legislative Assembly from the Raipur Constituency during 2003-08
- Onkar Singh Lakhawat, lawyer, politician, writer, and a senior BJP leader from Rajasthan.He is serving as the Chairman of Rajasthan Heritage Conservation and Promotion Authority.He is a former Member of Parliament in the Rajya Sabha(1997–2000).He was a Minister of State in the Second Raje ministry (2014-2019).He was also the Vice-President of the BJP in Rajasthan
- Surendra Singh Jadawat, former Chairman of Rajasthan Heritage Conservation and Promotion Authority. He was a Minister of State in the Third Ashok Gehlot ministry. He has also represented Chittorgarh Assembly constituency in the Rajasthan Legislative Assembly between 1998 and 2003 and 2008–2013. He is a member of All India Congress Committee.
- B. K. Gadhvi, also known as Bhairavdanji K Gadhvi (5 April 1937 – 18 September 2005), was a politician of Indian National Congress from Gujarat and a former member of Lok Sabha representing Banaskantha. He served as Union Minister of State for Finance during the Rajiv Gandhi ministry and President of Gujarat Pradesh Congress Committee (GPCC)
- Pushpdan Shambhudan Gadhavi, advocate, and BJP leader from Gujarat. He was a member of the 11th, 12th, 13th & 14th Lok Sabha of India representing the Kachchh (Lok Sabha constituency) of Gujarat.
- Mukesh Gadhvi, Member of Indian National Congress. He was a one-time Member of Parliament (MP) from Banaskantha and three-time Member of Legislative Assembly (MLA) from Danta. born in Jhanker Village Sirohi, Rajasthan.

== Film and media ==
- Sanjay Gadhvi (1965–2023), Indian film director and writer
- Pankaj Udhas (1951–2024), Indian ghazal and playback singer
- Hemu Gadhavi (1929–1965), Gujarati singer, songwriter, composer, playwright, and actor
- Aditya Gadhvi playback singer and lyricist from Gujarat. He has numerous chart-topping songs in various Indian languages
- Kushal Gadhavi Gujarati Folk Singer,Lok Sahityakar and Playback Singer
