= Ambadan Rohadiya =

Gujarati scholar and critic

- Born: 1 April 1959 (age 67); Rajkot
- Education: BA; MA; PhD; MPhil
- Alma mater: Saurashtra University
- Occupations: Scholar; Critic; Writer; professor
- Writing career
- Language: Gujarati; Dingal; Rajasthani; Hindi
- Notable works: Charani Sahtiya Vividha Sandarbhe Avagāhana; Sabhaparva Bhringipurana
- Notable awards: Gujarat Sahitya Akademi Award (2020); Kavishri Kag Bapu Lok Sahitya Award (2004)

Ambadan Rohadiya is an Indian writer, critic, academic, and scholar of Dingala, Gujarati, and Rajasthani and is considered as an authority in Charan literature as well as folk literature of Gujarat. His research works and publications of narrative charanic texts span around four decades. As an academic, Ambadan served as professor and HOD of Gujarati department at the Saurashtra University as well as presided as the Director of the Meghani Lok Sahitya Kendra which annually awards the Jhaverchand Meghani Award.

== Career ==
Ambadan started as a reader in Sahitya Bhawan at Saurashtra University where he completed his master's degree. He was a regular visitor at the Gujarati department which housed more than 12 thousand manuscripts of Gujarati and Charan literature. Early on, he came in contact with Ratudan Rohadiya and Kavi Dad who led the manuscript safeguarding and conservation effort resulting in the massive collection of manuscripts at the university. Through Ratudan, he took part in the research and editing of these manuscripts. He completed his PhD doctorate over the 16th century saint-poet Hardas Misan, author of Jalandhar Puran and Bhringi Puran among other texts. He also focused his research on other medieval poets including Mahatma Isardas, Asaji Rohadiya and Langidas Mahedu.

As a professor and HOD of Gujarati at Saurashtra University, Ambadan launched various certificate courses and seminars on Charan and Jain literature and his efforts to open a unique department of Charan literature and studies were successful. From 2004 onwards, he served as the head of this department. He was appointed director of the Jhaverchand Meghani Lok Shahitya Kendra established in 2011. In 2015, Ambadan was invited to speak at North America Literary Convention by Gujarati Literary Academy held in New Jersey, US.

=== Positions held ===
| Position | Organization | Term |
|---|---|---|
| Director | Jhaverchand Meghani Folk Literature Centre | 2011—2021 |
| Member | University Granth Nirman Board | 2013—2018 |
| HOD | Gujarati, Saurashtra University | |
| Member | Advisory Board-Gujarati, Sahitya Akademi | 2013—2018 |
| President | Itihas Sankalan Samiti-Gujarat | 2020 onwards |
| Head | Gujarati Teachers Union | 2019 |
| HOD | Charan Sahitya Department, Saurashtra University | 2004 onwards |

=== Recognition ===
1. Kavi Kag Award (2004)
2. Pravasi Rajasthani Sahityakar Samman by Rajasthani Bhasha Sahitya and Sanskriti Akademi (2013)
3. Gujarat Sahitya Akademi Award – I – for Charani Sahtiya Vividha Sandarbhe (2020)
4. Gujarat Sahitya Akademi Award – II – for Sabhaparva
5. Gujarat Sahitya Akademi Award – III – for Bhringipurana
6. Facilitated at the Pramukh Swami Centenary Anniversary (2022)

== Published works ==
1. Cāraṇī Sāhitya Vimarśa (in Gujarati). Cāraṇī Sāhitya Saṃśodhana Saṃvardhana Kendra. (1992)
2. Kag Aai Mahatmya (in Gujarati). (1996)
3. Cāraṇī sāhitya sandarbha (in Gujarati). Praveen Prakashan. (1998)
4. Sāhityābhimukha (in Gujarati). Praveen Prakashan. (1999)
5. Mahātmā Haradāsajī Misaṇa kr̥ta Jālandharapurāṇa (in Gujarati). Praveen Prakashan. (1999)
6. Avagāhana (in Gujarati). (2000)
7. Asmitā ane anusandhāna (in Gujarati). Sāhityadhārā. (2001)
8. Sāhityane sīmāḍethī (in Gujarati). (2002)
9. Śabdopāsanā (in Gujarati). (2003)
10. Vāṇī to Amarata Vadāṃ. Māhitī Khātu. (2003)
11. Sanshaptaka (2004)
12. Haradāsa Misaṇa krit Bhr̥ṅgīpurāṇa (in Gujarati). Ḍiṅgala Sāhitya Śodha Saṃsthāna. (2005)
13. Gaḍhavī, Khetasiṃha Nāraṇajī. Cāraṇa Kavi Caritra (in Hindi). Sāhitya Saṃsthāna. ISBN 978-81-89495-50-3. (2006)
14. Sopāna (in Gujarati). (2007)
15. Charani Sahitya : Vibhinna Paripekshya (in Gujarati). (2008)
16. Cāraṇī Sāhitya: vāraso ane vaibhava (in Gujarati). (2008)
17. Cāraṇī Sāhitya: sarjana ane bhāvana (in Gujarati). (2008)
18. Cāraṇī Sāhitya: pūjā ane parīkshā (in Gujarati). (2008)
19. Bhr̥ṅgīpurāṇa (2010)
20. Śabdāyana (2011)
21. Ambadan Rohdiya, Nahar Singh Jasol. Jalandhar Puran (in Hindi). ISBN 978-9385593819 (2016)
22. Cāraṇī Sāhitya ane Lokasāhitya (in Gujarati). Vivekagrāma Prakāśana. ISBN 978-93-89070-88-0. (2020)
23. Charani Sahitya : Vividh Sandarbhe (in Gujarati). Divine Publications. ISBN 9789387908970 (2020)
24. Charani Sahitya : Samipe (in Gujarati). (2022)
25. Charani Sahitya : Manimala (in Gujarati). ISBN 9789394649163 (2023)

=== Co-author/editor ===
1. Asaji Rohadiya (1989)
2. Ratudan Rohadiya, Ambadan Rohadiya. Langidasa Mahedu krit Sata Smaraṇa (in Gujarati). (1990)
3. Ratudan Rohadiya, Ambadan Rohadiya. Sayaji Jhula krit Rukimani Harana (in Gujarati). Cāraṇī Sāhitya Saṃśodhana ane Samvardhana Kendra. (1992)
4. M Paṭel, Ambadan Rohadiya. Cāraṇa sarjaka paricaya Volume-1 (in Gujarati). (1995)
5. Haradasa Misana krit Sabhāparva (in Gujarati). (1998)
6. Balavanta Jānī, Ambādāna Rohaḍiyā, Pālaravabhā. Svarga bhūlāvuṃ Śāmaḷā (in Gujarati). (1998)
7. Harirasa 2005, 2019
8. Guna Ninda Stuti 2005, 2019
9. Hala Jhala ra Kundaliya 2005, 2019
10. Loksahitya −1 2006
11. Loksahitya −2 2007
12. Tulnatmak Sahitya 2007
13. Kutch Darshan 2008, 2019
14. Ambadan Rohadiya, Amrut Patel, Balvant Jani. Uttar Gujaratni Lokkathao: Svadhyaya ane Sarvekshan. Parshva Publication. 2008
15. ‘Vicharbharti’ Sahityakar Parichayank 2009
16. ‘Rajabhasha’ Charani Sahitya Visheshank 2012
17. Algarini Olakh 2019
