= Gadhavi (title) =

Charan title & surname

Gadhavi is an honorific title of the Charans of Gujarat. In earlier times, as some Charans were owners or governors of forts, i.e. Gadh, they came to be known as Gadhavi. It is synonymous with Charan and is used as a surname. It is also spelled as Gadhvi or Gadvi.

== Etymology ==
The word Gadhavi has been derived from semi-Prakrit and semi-Sanskrit words Gadha (fort) and Pati (master), i.e. keeper of a fort. Masters of fort were called Gadhapati which changed to Gadhavi through the Prakrit Gadha-vai.

== Notable people ==
- Isudan Gadhvi
- Jigardan Gadhavi
- Sanjay Gadhvi
- Kirtidan Gadhvi
- Bhikhudan Gadhvi
- Aditya Gadhvi
- Dadudan Gadhvi
- Mukesh Gadhvi
- B. K. Gadhvi
- Shambhudan Gadhvi
- Milind Gadhavi
- Pingalshi Brahmanand Gadhvi
- Hemu Gadhavi
- Pushpdan Shambhudan Gadhavi
- [ [Nayan bhikha gadhavi] ]
- [ [Vala aasha gadhavi] ]

== See also ==
- Barhath
- Kaviraja
