= Bhanwar Singh Samaur =

Indian writer (b. 1943)

Dr. Bhanwar Singh Samaur
- Born: 15 August 1943 (age 83); Bobasar, Churu (Bikaner State)
- Education: University of Rajasthan
- Occupations: Poet; Writer; professor
- Spouse: Kusum Kanwar
- Writing career
- Language: Dingal; Rajasthani; Hindi
- Notable works: Rajasthani Shakti Kavya Sanskriti ri Sanatan Deeth; Yugantarki Sanyasi; Prachin Rajasthani Kavya Sangrah Aauva ka Dharna
- Notable awards: Sahitya Akademi Award (2020); Kavi Kag Award (2020)

Bhanwar Singh Samaur (born 15 August 1943) is an Indian writer, poet, historian, and social worker from Rajasthan. Samaur is the recipient of the Sahitya Akademi Award 2020 (in Rajasthani language) for his work Sanskriti ri Sanatana Deeth. His career has spanned more than 50 years including works on history, literature, and poetry in Rajasthani as well as Hindi. Dr. Samaur is a retired Hindi Lecturer from Lohia Postgraduate College, Churu.

Samaur is considered an expert on Marwari (Rajasthani) language. His ongoing work is Rajasthani (Marwari)-English-Hindi Dictionary.

In February 2020, he was awarded the Kavi Shri Kag Bapu Lok Sahitya Award.

== Early life and education ==
Samaur was born on 15 August 1943 in Bobasar village in Churu, Rajasthan. His father was Ujeen Dan and grandfather was Chaturdan Samaur.

Samaur completed his Master of Arts in Hindi Literature from Rajasthan University.

== Career ==
Samaur taught as Lecturer in Hindi at Lohia Postgraduate College in Churu, Rajasthan. He also served as the Vice-Principal of Government Girls College, Ratangarh.

Samaur's Yugantarakari Sanyasi book was released by the Prime Minister of Mauritius Anerood Jugnauth in Mauritius.

Samaur is also a pioneer in social service, through Lokbharti Bhawan in Bobasar, started the library movement, social service camps so that no one should sleep hungry. The latter program was later accepted by the state government and expanded in Rajasthan. Samaur also helped in the establishment of libraries in around 50 villages of Gujarat.

Bhanwar Singh also chaired sessions during the Sahitya Akademi seminar in 2006.

== Rajasthan Sabadkosh Linguist Committee ==
Samaur is a member of Linguistic Experts Committee formed for the development of Rajasthani Sabadkosh Project, which aims to digitalise & expand the works Dr. Sitaram Lalas on Rajasthani language.

== Published works ==
- Samaura, Bhamvara Simha (1 January 1993). Yugantarakari Sannyasi (in Hindi). Prabhat Prakashan. ISBN 978-81-7315-059-3. (Devidan Ratnu)
- Sāmaura, Bhaṃvara Siṃha (1999). Rājasthānī śaktti kāvya (in Hindi). Sāhitya Akādemī. ISBN 978-81-260-0625-0. (राजस्थानी शक्ति काव्य)
- Sāmaura, Bhaṃvara Siṃha (2020). Āūvā kā dharanā (in Hindi). Rājasthānī Granthāgāra. ISBN 978-93-87297-92-0. (आऊवा का धरना)
- Sāmaura, Bhaṃvara Siṃha (1995). Śaṅkaradāna Sāmaura (in Hindi). Sāhitya Akādemī. ISBN 978-81-7201-867-2. (शंकरदान सामौर)
- Samskrti ri sanatana ditha: nibandha sangraha. Vikasa Prakasana. 2020. ISBN 978-93-80917-33-7. (संस्कृति री सनातन दीठ)
- Sāmaura, Bhaṃvara Siṃha (2009). Hamāre sāhitya nirmātā, Rāvata Sārasvata (in Hindi). Ekatā Prakāśana.
- Sāmaura, Bhaṃvara Siṃha (2002). Cūrū Maṇḍala ke yaśasvī cāraṇa (in Hindi). Loka Bhāratī Bhavana. (चूरू मंडल के यशस्वी चारण)
- Sāmaura, Bhaṃvara Siṃha (2001). Śekhāvāṭī ke yaśasvī cāraṇa (in Hindi). Loka Bhāratī Bhavana. (शेखावाटी के यशस्वी चारण)
- Cāraṇa baḍī amolaka cīja (in Hindi). Cāraṇa Sāhitya Śodha Saṃsthāna. 1989.
- Jīvana Kaviyā, Bhaṃvara Siṃha Sāmaura (1996). Maraṇa-tyūṃhāra (in Hindi). Rājasthānī Sāhitya Saṃsthāna. (मरण त्योहार)
- Sāmora, Bhaṃvarasiṃha (1987). Loka pūjya deviyām̐ (in Hindi). Cāraṇa Sāhitya Śodha Saṃsthāna. (लोक पुज्य देवियाँ)
- Prachin Rajasthani Kavya Sangrah (प्राचीन राजस्थानी काव्य संग्रह)
- Lok Niti Kavya (लोक नीति काव्य)

== Awards ==
- Sahitya Akademi Award 2020 (Rajasthani language)
- Kavi Shri Kag Bapu Lok Sahitya Award
- Rajasthani Culture Award from Rajasthani Language Literature Culture Academy Bikaner 2013
- Cultural Award from Rajasthan Cultural Council
- Kaviraj Sanvaldan Ashiya Award from Karni Seva Mandal
- Marudhara ra Moti Award
- Gold Medal by Hindi Sahitya Sansad
- Pandit Bharat Vyas Award by
- Samprati Sansthan Award
- Kanhaiyalal Sethia Mayad Bhasha Seva Samman
- Surajmal Mohta Literary Award

== Bibliography ==
- Meghwal, Bhaniram (2022). Bhaṃvara Siṃha Sāmaura Ke Gadya Sāhitya Kā Anuśīlana. HSRA Publications. ISBN 978-93-5506-246-8.
