= Gadhvi =

Gadhvi is a surname. Notable people with the surname include:

- Kirtidan Gadhvi (born 1975), Indian singer from Gujarat
- Sanjay Gadhvi (1965–2023), Indian writer and film director
- Aditya Gadhvi (born 1994), Indian singer and lyricist
- Isudan Gadhvi, Indian Politician
- Shambhudan Gadhvi, Geologist from Gujarat who discovered the Indus valley site of Dholavira
- Dadudan Gadhvi (1940–2021), Gujarati poet
- Mukesh Gadhvi, Indian politician
- Bhikhudan Gadhvi (born 1948), Indian folk singer
- B. K. Gadhvi (1937 – 2005), Indian politician
- Pingalshi Meghanand Gadhvi (1914–1998), Gujarati folklorist, singer and writer

== See also ==
- Charan
