= Suryamal Mishran Shikhar Award =

Literary honour awarded for special contribution to Rajasthani literature

- Award for contributions to Literature
- Sponsored by: Rajasthani Bhasha Sahitya and Sanskriti Akademi, Government of Rajasthan
- Reward: ₹71,000 (US$760)
- First award: 1985
- Final award: 2023

Highlights
- Total awarded: 25
- First winner: Shakti Dan Kaviya
- Most Recent winner: Madhu Acharya
- Website: artandculture.rajasthan.gov.in

Suryamal Mishran Shikhar Award is a literary honour granted by the Rajasthani Bhasha Sahitya and Sanskriti Akademi for special contribution to Rajasthani literature. It was established in the memory of the 19th century poet-historian Suryamal Misran.

== Recipients ==
The award consists of ₹71,000. Following is the list of recipients:

Year	Author	Title of the work	Genre	Amount	References
1985-86	Shakti Dan Kaviya	Sanskriti ri Souram	Essay	11,000	
1986-87	Kanhaiya Lal Sethia	Sabad	Poetry	11,000	
1987-88	Narayan Singh Shivakar, Nokha	Durgadas Satsai	Poetry	11,000	
1988-89	Bhagwatiprasad Choudhary	Tulsi Channan	Poetry	11,000	
1990-91	Kalyan Singh Rajawat	Kun Kun Nain Bilmasi	Poetry	11,000	
1991-92	Annaram Sudama	Achook Ilaaj	Story	11,000	
1992-93	Jyotipunj	Bol Dungri Dhab Dhabuk	Poetry	11,000	
1993-94	Dr. Narsingh Rajpurohit	Adhura Supna	Story	11,000	
1994-95	Kishore Kalpanakant	Kukh Padyai ri Peed	Poetry	15,000	
1995-96	Dr. Nemnarayan Joshi	Oloon ri Akhiyatan	Sketch	21,000	
1996-97	Badridan Gaden	Antas Alok	Poetry	21,000	
1997-98	Arjun Deo Charan	Dharam Juddha	Drama	21,000	
1998-99	Satyen Joshi	Fer Ugaila Suraj	Poetry	21,000	
1999-2000	Srilal Nathmal Joshi	Maindhi, Kaneer ar Gulab	Story	21,000	
2000-2001	Suryashankar Pareek	Suraj Kade Visunjai Koni	Essay	21,000	
2001-02	Dr. Govind Singh Rathod	Ganva Me Ganv Suhavno	Story	21,000	
2002-03	Dr. Kundan Mali	Sagar Pankhi	Poetry	21,000	
2003-04	Malchand Tiwari	Celebration	Story	21,000	
2004-05	Chandra Prakash Deval	Udeek Purana	Poetry	21,000	
2005-06	Dr. Venkat Sharma	Kavya Shastra: Bhartiya Deeth	Essay	21,000	
2006-07	Mangat Badal	Dashmesh	Poetry	21,000	
2011-12	Shivraj Changani	Ikkad Bikkad	Poetry	31,000	
2012-13	Aidan Singh Bhati	Aankh Hiye ra Harial Sapna	Poetry	71,000	
2013-14	Nand Bharadwaj	Badalti Sargam	Story Collection	71,000	
2022-23	Madhu Acharya 'Ashawadi'	Peed Adi Pal Bandh	Poetry	71,000	
