= Music of Gujarat =

Gujarat, a western state of India, is known for music traditions of both folk and classical music.

== Folk music ==
Gujarati folk music consists of a wide variety. Bhajan, a devotional song type, is categorized by theme of poetry/lyrics and by musical compositions such as Prabhatiya, Garba, etc. The Barot, Charan and Gadhvi communities have preserved and enriched the folk tradition of storytelling with or without music. This includes the forms of Doha, Sorathaa, Chhand, etc.

The songs and music accompanying traditional dance forms such as Garba, Dandiya Raas, Padhar, Dangi and Tippani are unique in nature.

Dayro and Lokvarta are music performances where people gather to listen performer who delivers religious as well as social message through it. Marasiyas are an elegiac form of music originated from Marsiya. Fattanna or Lagna-geets are a light form of song and music played during marriages.

Bhavai and Akhyana are folk musical theatre performed in Gujarat.

== Exponents ==
Classical musicians and composers include Faiyaz Khan and Pandit Omkarnath Thakur along with a tradition of Haveli Sangeet.

Gujarati Folk music performers include Kinjal Dave, Kirtidan Gadhvi, Geeta Rabari, Jignesh Kaviraj, Arvind Barot, Vaishali Harin Gohil, Hemant Chauhan, Bhikhudan Gadhvi, Diwaliben Bhil, Hemu Gadhavi, Harshida Raval, Praful Dave and Aishwarya Majmudar.
