= Kavi Kag Award =

Literary honour in Gujarat, India

- Award for contributions to Literature
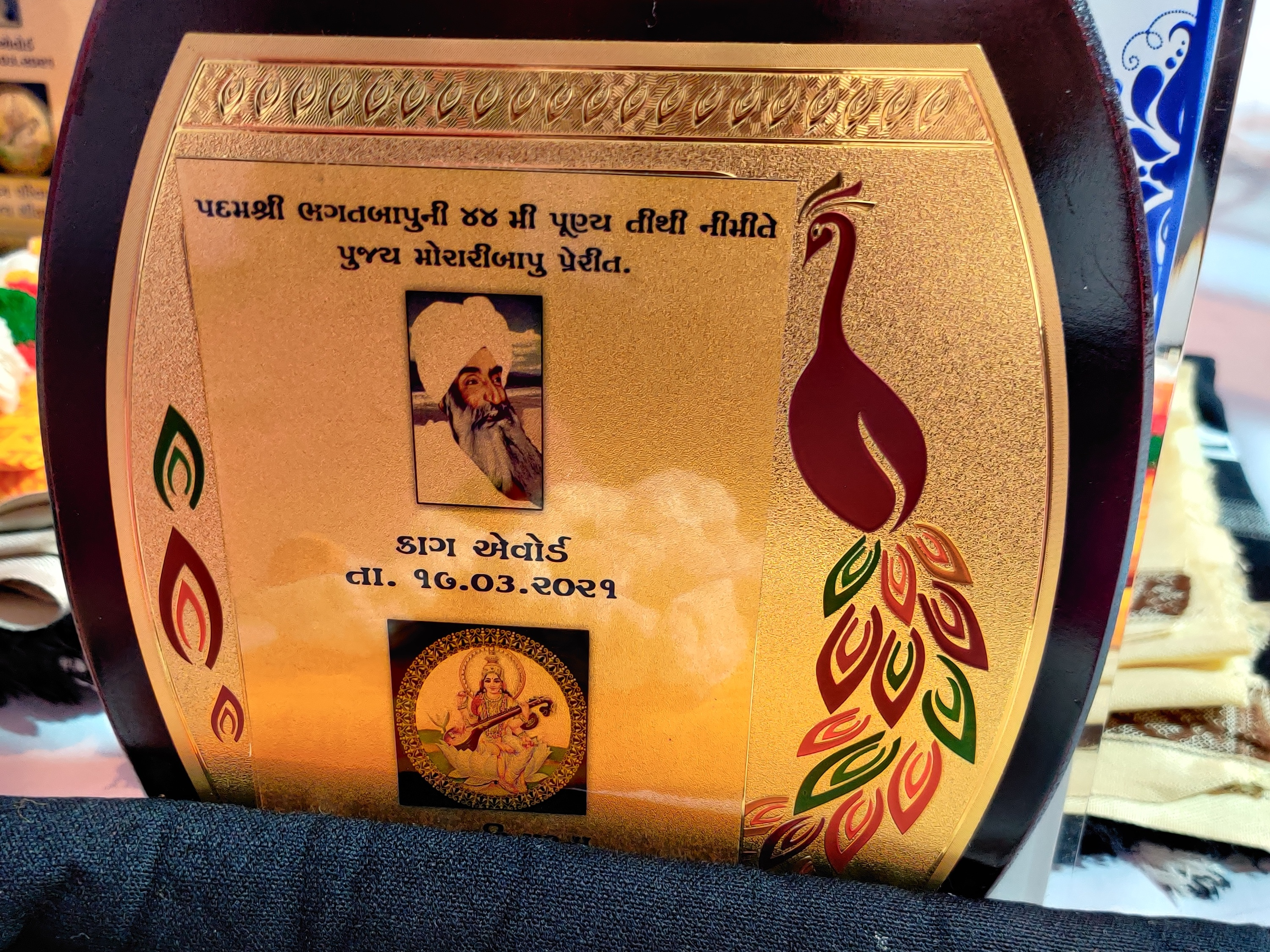
- Awarded for: Presented for the contribution to Gujarati-folk and Charan literature
- Reward: ₹51,000 (US$540) each
- First award: 2002

Highlights
- Total: 110+
- Website: kagsahitya.org

Kavi Kag Award (Gujarati: કવિ કાગ ઍવોર્ડ) is an annual award named after the Gujarati poet Dula Bhaya Kag, given to folk artists, writers, scholars and institutions for contributions to Gujarati folk as well as Charan literature. It was instituted in 2002 with the inspiration and blessings of Morari Bapu. The award is presented every year on the death anniversary of Dula Bhaya Kag, on Kag Chauth (Fagan Sud Chauth), at Kagdham (Majadar), Amreli.

Five awards are given to folk artists and writers of Gujarati, and one award is given to a Rajasthani scholar for research in the field of literature. The recipients are honored with an incentive of Rs 51000/-, mementos, and shawls.

== Recipients ==
Year	Recipients	Notes
2002	1. Pingalshibhai Patabhai; 2. Merubha Gadhavi; 3. Hemubhai Gadhavi; 4. Kanjibhai Barot	
2003	1. Narayanadan Balia; 2. Jethsurbhai Dev; 3. Jayamalbhai Parmar; 4. Kanubhai Barot	
2004	1. Lakhabhai Gadhavi; 2. Amardasji Kharwala; 3. Kavi Dad; 4. Ambadan Rohadiya	
2005	1. Khetsinh Misan; 2. Babubhai Ranpara; 3. Punjat Rabari; 4. Darbar Shri Punjwala	
2006	1. Shambhudanji Gadhavi; 2. Labhubhai Bhansalia; 3. Amarnath Nathji; 4. Karshanbhai Padhiar	
2007	1. Vivaram Hariani; 2. Ratudan Rohadiya; 3. Pranlal Vyas; 4. Takhtdan Rohadia	
2008	1. Apabhai Kalabhai Gadhavi; 2. Niranjan Rajyaguru; 3. Jitidan Gadhavi; 4. Kavi Pal	
2009	1. Bachubhai Gadhavi; 2. Sarojben Gundani; 3. Ishwardan Gadhavi; 4. Kanubhai Jani	
2010	1. Gigubhai Leela; 2. Bhikhudan Gadhavi; 3. Maheshdan Misan; 4. Dolatbhai Bhatt	
2011	1. Harisinh Mojdan Mahedu; 2. Husu Yagnik; 3. Vijaydan Detha (Rajasthan); 4. Bapalbhai Gadhavi; 5. Divaliben Bhil	
2012	1. Upendra Trivedi; 2. Shivdan Gadhavi; 3. Harsur Gadhavi; 4. Praful Dave; 5. Chandra Prakash Deval (Rajasthan)	
2013	1. Ratikumar Vyas; 2. Abhesinh Rathore; 3. Narottam Palan; 4. Laxmanbhai P. Gadhavi; 5. Shaktidan Kaviya (Rajasthan)	
2014	1. Dulerai Kalani; 2. Palu Bhagat; 3. Pushpaben Chaya; 4. Joravarsinh Jadav; 5. Onkar Singh Lakhawat (Rajasthan)	
2015	1. Mavdanji Ratnu; 2. Prabhudan Suru; 3. Bihari Gadhavi; 4. Ramanik Maru; 5. Sohandan Charan	
2016	1. Ranchodada Joshi; 2. Arvind Barot; 3. Kavi Aal; 4. Govardhan Sharma; 5. Arjun Deo Charan	
2017	1. Tharya Bhagat; 2. Vasantadas Hariyani; 3. Mayabhai Ahir; 4. Meran Gadhavi; 5. Kalyan Singh Shekhawat	
2018	1. Bhudharji Joshi; 2. Govind Amara Gadhavi; 3. Hardanji Khadia; 4. Damayantiben Bardai; 5. Devkaran Singh Rathore (Rajasthan); 6. Jhaverchand Meghani Folklore Centre	
2019	1. Kavi Trapajkar; 2. Vasantbhai Gadhavi; 3. Kirtidan Gadhavi; 4. Raghuraj Singh Hada (Rajasthan); 5. Akashvani Center Rajkot	
2020	1. Narandanji Suru; 2. Ratilal Nathalal Dave; 3. Anubha Gadhavi; 4. Rajbha Gadhavi (Gir); 5. Bhanwar Singh Samaur (Rajasthan)	
2021	1. Gigabhai Barot (Doliya); 2. Manubhai Gadhavi (Mumbai); 3. Balwantbhai Jani (Rajkot); 4. Yogeshbhai Gadhavi (Boksha); 5. Kashiben Gohil (Bhavnagar); 6. Nahar Singh Jasol (Temawas, Rajasthan)	
2022	1. Meghraj Molubha Gadhvi (Mhadad); 2. Yashwant Lamba (Jambuda); 3. Indubahen Patel (Kota-Rajasthan); 4. Bhavnabehan Labadia and Sangeetabehan Labadia (Porbandar, Ahmedabad); 5. Mahendra Bhanawat (Scholar from Rajasthan)	
2023	1. Nagbhai Lakhabhai Khalel (Magarwada); 2. Hareshdan Suru; 3. Ishudan Gadhavi (Ratnu) (Himatnagar); 4. Nileshbhai Pandya (Rajkot); 5. Gajadan Charan (Nathusar-Rajasthan)	
2024	1. Late Shri Manubhai Jodhani; 2. Shri Devrajbhai Gadhvi; 3. Shri Rajulbhai Dave; 4. Shri Lakhanshibhai Gadhvi; 5. Shri Girdhardan Ratnu (Rajasthan)	
2025	1. Late Shri Bhailaalbhai Kavi; 2. Shri Aashanandbhai Gadhvi (Zarpara); 3. Shri Dhanrajbhai Gadhvi (Ahmedabad); 4. Shri Amudanbhai Gadhvi; 5. Shri Lakshmandan Kaviya (Rajasthan)	

== See also ==
- Dula Bhaya Kag
- Gujarati literature
