= Arjun Deo Charan =

Indian writer & theatre personality (born 1954)

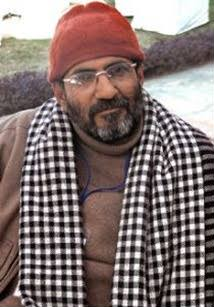
- Born: 10 May 1954 (age 72); Mathania, India
- Occupations: Playwright, theatre director Founder, Rammat Theatre Group
- Years active: 1974–present
- Children: Aashish Deo Charan
- Awards: Sangeet Natak Akademi Award in Playwright, 1992

Arjun Deo Charan (born 1954) is a Rajasthani poet, critic, playwright, theatre director and translator. A prominent figure in Indian theatre, he is among the country's top 10 theatre personalities.

== Early life ==
Charan was born on 10 May 1954 in the village of Mathania, Jodhpur. His father Renvat Dan Charan was a Rajasthani poet and socialist, who had won Sahitya Akademi Award for his work Uchhalo. Charan was Head of Department of Rajasthani Language in the Jai Narain Vyas University, Jodhpur. He was selected as Chairman of Rajasthan Sangeet Natak Akademi, Jodhpur on 26 November 2011 for three years.

The K. K. Birla Foundation has awarded the 21st Bihari Puraskar for 2011 to Arjun Deo Charan for his Rajasthani poetry collection Ghar Tau Ek Nam Hai Bhrosai Rau.

He has been awarded by Sahitya Akademi, Delhi for his book Dharam Judh in 1992. He also has been awarded by Rajasthan Sangeet Natak Akademi for his contribution to the Rajasthani language theatre in 1999.

Arjun Deo Charan is the founder of Rammat Theatre Group, Jodhpur, which is one of the prestigious theatre group of country. Charan's plays have been performed on several National and International theatre festivals including Bharat Rang Mahotsav.

Charan has performed his play in Karachi, Pakistan.

Charan's play Meh Raja The Parja was performed in 3rd Rajasthani Annual International Art Festival in Jaipur.

== Published works ==
- Charan, Arjun Dev. Virasat (in Hindi). Vani Prakashan.
- Charan, Arjun Deo. (2021). Pancham Veda (in Hindi). Gayatri Parakashan.
- Charan, Arjun Deo. (2022). Jagadamba (in Hindi). Gayatri Parakashan. ISBN 978-93-90721-54-2
- Charan, Arjun Dev (1 January 2003). Adhunik Punjabi Kavita (in Hindi). Sahitya Akademi Publications. ISBN 978-81-260-1404-0.
- Charan, Arjun Dev (1 January 2006). Dharmyuddh (in Hindi). Sāhitya Akādemī. ISBN 978-81-260-2255-7.
- Charan, Arjun Dev (1 January 2003). Satyaprakāśa Jośī (in Hindi). Sāhitya Akādemī. ISBN 978-81-260-1597-9.
- Cāraṇa, Arjunadeva (2002). Bagata rī bārakhaṛī (in Hindi). Kavi Prakāśana. ISBN 978-81-86436-33-2.
- Cāraṇa, Arjunadeva (1998). Rājasthānī kahāṇī, paramparā-vikāsa (in Hindi). Rājasthānī Sāhitya Saṃsthāna.

== Awards ==
- Rajasthani Sahitya Akademi – Award, 1980
- Sahitya Akademi, New Delhi Award, 1992.
- Suryamal Mishran Shikhar Award of Rajasthani Bhasa Sahitya Evam Sanskriti Akademi, 1997
- Rajasthan Sangeet Natak Akademi Award, 1999
- Maru-Parampara Samman, 2004.
- Bihari Puraskar, K.K Birla Foundation, 2011
- Sangeet Natak Akademi Award, New Delhi, 2012
- Kavi Kag Award, 2016
