= Shakti Dan Kaviya =

Indian poet, writer, and scholar (1940–2021)

- Born: 17 July 1940; Birai, Jodhpur State
- Died: 13 January 2021 (aged 80)
- Education: SKS College Jodhpur (BA); Jai Narain Vyas University (PhD)
- Occupations: Poet; Writer; professor
- Writing career
- Language: Dingal; Rajasthani; Hindi; Brajbhasha
- Notable works: Sanskriti ri Sauram Dingal ke Aitihasik Prabandh Kavya; Dharti Ghani Rupali Sapootan ri Dharti
- Notable awards: Sahitya Akademi Award(1993) Rajasthan Sahitya Akademi Award; Kavi Kag Award (2013) Braj Bhasha Akadami Puraskar

Shakti Dan Kaviya (17 July 1940 – 13 January 2021) was a poet, writer, critic, and scholar from Rajasthan, India. Kaviya had served as the department head of Hindi as well as Rajasthani section multiple times at Jai Narain Vyas University. He was considered an authority in Dingal (Rajasthani) literature as well as a great scholar of Hindi and Braj-Bhasha. Kaviya was also a Sahitya Akademi Award recipient for his work 'Dharti Ghani Rupali'

== Early life and family ==
Shakti Dan Kaviya was born on 17 July 1940 in Birai village of Jodhpur, Rajasthan. His father Govind Dan ji Kaviya was a scholar of Rajasthani (Dingal) and Braj literature.

His maternal uncle, Alseedan ji Ratnu was the Raj-Kavi (Poet-Laureate) of Jaisalmer state. In 1956, Shakti Dan was married to Leher Kanwar of Kharoda, Sindh. Kaviya has five sons:

- Virendra Kaviya
- Manjit Singh Kaviya
- Narpat Dan Kaviya
- Himmat Singh Kaviya
- Vasudev Kaviya

== Education ==
Kaviya's school education was completed in Balesar Government School and Mathania School. For the metric exam, he went to Chopasani school in Jodhpur. During his studies in Mathania School, he was a student under Padma-Shree Sita Ram Lalas, who went on to write the first dictionary of Rajasthani language, Rajasthani Sabadakos.

During his education in Jodhpur, Kaviya actively participated in social, literature, and debate events winning accolades for his performance. He took part in Rajasthani & Hindi poetry events as well as translation of English works into Rajasthani.

Even at this young age, Kaviya came in contact with important litterateurs and dignitaries. In 1951, when Kaviya was in fifth-standard, he started a correspondence with Shankar Dan Detha, Raj-Kavi (Poet-Laurette) of Limbdi(Kathiawar) State. In sixth standard of schooling, Kaviya published his composition dedicated to Hindu Goddess Karni Mata titled 'Shri Karni Yash Prakash' in Sadhna Press (Jodhpur). During his Bachelor of Arts studies in university, Kaviya translated the English poem Elegy by Thomas Grey into Rajasthani and wrote its meaning in Hindi. This Rajasthani rendering & the associated Hindi gist was published in the monthly Prerna magazine in its April edition in 1959.

Kaviya was the first student of SKS College (Jodhpur) whose poems and compositions were selected for regular broadcast in Akasvani (All India Radio) Jaipur. Later, he became an elected member of Akasvani Program Advisory Committee.

Kaviya was also active during India-China war of 1962 and his Dingal and Braj poems on the subject were regularly published.

In 1964, when Jai Narain Vyas University started publication of its Annual Magazine, Kaviya worked as Advisor of its Rajasthani section.

In 1969, Kaviya completed his PhD from Jodhpur University over his research thesis on Dingal ke Aitihasik Prabhandha Kavya.

== Career ==
Kaviya joined Jai Narain Vyas University Jodhpur as a lecturer and was a part of the institution for 40 years. For 17 years, he taught as part of Hindi department and for 20 years, he taught in Rajasthani Department.

Kaviya was a great scholar of literature. His works focused on Rajasthani, Dingal, Hindi, and Braj literature. Kaviya served thrice as the Head of Department of Rajasthani at Jai Narain Vyas University, Jodhpur.

In 1974–75, the Rajasthani language was recognized by Sahitya Akademi & Jai Narain Vyas University launched the first-ever Rajasthani classes at the graduate level. Despite the low count of three students, Shakti Dan Kaviya accepted the responsibility of teaching the first batch and persuaded students to join the course, ultimately increasing the number of students to 19. He is credited as the first lecturer in the institution's history to teach Dingal Literature unviversity wide. During his tenure as Department Head of Rajasthani, JNVU University became the first in the world to offer MPhil course in Rajasthani language.

In 1993, Kaviya was awarded Sahitya Akademi Award for Dharti Ghani Rupali, which was a Rajasthani translation of 20 poems of Tarun Poetry by Rameshwar Lal Khandelwal.

Kaviya excelled at Dingal poetry and promoted it. He gave an introductory recital performance of Dingal poetry at Jaipur Literature Festival and was called "great maestro of Rajasthani Dingal poetry".

== Academic usage of Kaviya's works ==
=== Rangbhini ===
For the academic session 1976–77, Rangbhini by Shakti Dan Kavia was added to the official textbook for the second year syllabus of Bachelor of Arts studies.

=== Lokhini ===
Lokhini by Shakti Dan Kavia, a collection of Rajasthani folk tales in Dingal language, was part of syllabus of M.A. Hindi for 2 academic sessions of 1964–65 and 1965–67. Later, it became a reference book for the subject.

=== Sanskriti ri Soram ===
In 1986, Kaviya received the first Suryamal Misran Shikhar Award for the essay compilation titled Sanskriti ri Soram. From 1993 to 2000, the work 'Sanskriti ri Soram' was part of official syllabus for the Rajasthani Optional paper in Maharshi Dayanand Saraswati University, Ajmer.

=== Dharti Ghani Rupali ===
Kaviya received the Sahitya Akademi Award in 1993 for his poetry work titled Dharti Ghani Rupali.

== Academic associations ==
Kaviya was an award decision panel member of multiple literature associations including K. K. Birla Foundation(New Delhi), Sahitya Akademi(New Delhi), and Lakhotiya Awards (New Delhi).

=== Sahitya Akademi ===
Due to his immense knowledge and contribution in Hindi, Rajasthani, and Braj literature, he had been a member of all three respective Sahitya Akademi(s) of Rajasthani, Hindi, and Brajbhasha.

== Italy tour and Trieste University ==
In 1987, Kaviya traveled to Italy for the International Literature Seminar as an expert on Dingal. The seminar lasted for 8 days where he brought attention to Dingal poetry. In Italy, Kaviya also gave a lecture on the 'Contribution of L.P. Tessitori in Rajasthani Literature'. At University of Trieste, Kaviya gave lectures on Dingal literature.

== Death ==
Kaviya died on 13 January 2021 at the age of 80. He had been unwell for the previous few days.

Scholars and littérateurs from all over Rajasthan paid their tributes including Aidan Singh Bhati, Gajadan Charan, Mohan Singh Ratnu, Minaxi Borana, Gajesingh Rajpurohit, Bhanwarlal Suthar, Sukhdev Rao, and Indra Dan Charan. Kaviya was equated with "Sun of Dingal language" at his passing due to his immense contribution for bringing Dingal language and literature to the next generation.

== Significance ==
Kaviya's research works have been translated & published in English, Italian, and Gujarati as well. He has been credited for voracious Dingal recitation in multiple documentaries and telefilms.

== Awards and achievements ==
- Rajasthan Sahitya Akademi, Udaipur: Rajasthani Padya Puraskar (1982)
- Rajasthani Graduates Association Mumbai Puraskar (1984)
- Bharatiya Bhasha Parishad Award (1985)
- Rajasthan Ratnakara, New Delhi: Mahendra Jajodiya Puraskar (1986)
- Suryamalla Mishran Shikhar Award (1986)
- Maharana Mewar Foundation: Maharana Kumbha Award (1993)
- Shri Dwarka Sevanidhi Trust, Jaipur: Rajasthani Puraskar (1993)
- Sahitya Akademi Award for Translation for Rajasthani (1993)
- Sahitya Samiti, Bisau: Rajasthani Sahitya Puraskar (1994)
- Ghanashyamadas Saraf Sahitya Puraskar, Mumbai (2003)
- Fulchand Banthiya Puraskar, Bikaner (2003)
- Lakhotiya Puraskar, New Delhi (2005)
- Kamala Goenka Rajasthani Sahitya Puraskar, Mumbai (2005)
- Kavi Shri Kag Bapu Lok Sahitya Award (2013)
- Mahakavi Prithviraj Rathore Award (2013)
- Rajasthan Braj Bhasha Academy Award

== Published works ==
=== Rajasthani-language ===
- Kaviyā, Śaktidāna (1984). Saṃskr̥ti rī Sorabha (in Hindi). Thaḷavaṭa Prakāśana.
- Sapootan ri Dharti सपूतां री धरती (काव्य-संग्रै)
- Kaviyā, Śaktidāna (2006). Dārū-dūshaṇa: Ḍiṅgaḷa śailī meṃ soraṭhābaddha kāvya (in Hindi). Ācārya Tulasī Rājasthānī Śodha Saṃsthāna.
- Padma Shri Dr. Laxmikumari Chundawat (Biography) पद्मश्री डॉ. लक्ष्मीकुमारी चूंडावत (जीवनवृत्त)
- Dhara Surangi Dhat धरा सुरंगी धाट (काव्य-संग्रै)
- Dhoran ri Dharohar धोरां री धरोहर (काव्य-संग्रै)
- Prastavana ri Peeljol प्रस्तावना री पीलजोत (राजस्थानी निबंध)
- Eligi अेलीजी (अनुवाद)
- Dharti Ghani Rupali धरती घणी रुपाळी (पद्यानुवाद)
- Kaviyā, Śaktidāna (2014). Roonkh rasayan: poetry. Thalavaṭa Prakāśana.
- Sambodh Satsai संबोध सतसई
- Kaviyā, Śaktidāna (2014). Sonagira Sākau: Ḍiṅgala śailī meṃ aitihāsika kāvya (in Hindi). Thalavaṭa Prakāśana.
- Geet Gunmal गीत गुणमाल
- Durga Satsi दुर्गा सातसी

=== Hindi-language ===
- Vārhaspatya, K., Kaviyā, Ś. (1979). Karaṇī Caritra. India: Śrī Karaṇī Sāhitya Saṃsthāna.
- Kaviyā, Śaktidāna (1984). Rājasthānī sāhitya kā anuśīlana (in Hindi). Thaḷavaṭa Prakāśana.
- Śrī Yaśakaraṇa Khiṛiyā: vyaktitva-kr̥titva-sr̥jana prakriyā aru Braja-racanā mādhurī saṅkalana (in Hindi). Rājasthāna Brajabhāshā Akādamī. 1992.
- Kaviyā, Śaktidāna (1997). Diṅgala ke aitihāsika prabandhakāvya, (Samvat 1700 se 2000 Vi.) (in Hindi). Scientific Publishers. ISBN 978-81-7233-151-1.
- Kaviyā, Śaktidāna (2004). Rājasthānī kāvya meṃ sāṃskr̥tika gaurava (in Hindi). Mahārājā Mānasiṃha Pustaka Prakāśa.

=== Editorship of historical works ===
Sources

- Bārahaṭha, Kṛpārāma (1989). Rājiyā rā Soraṭhā. Rājasthānī Granthāgāra.
- Ūmaradāna (1991). Umāradāna-Granthāvalī: janakavi Ūmaradāna kī jīvanī aura kāvya-kr̥tiyām̐ (in Hindi). Rājasthānī Granthāgāra.
- Kaviyā, Śaktidāna (1966). Kāvya-Kusuma: Rājasthānī kaviyoṃ ke piṅgala-kāvya kī eka jhalaka (in Hindi). Lakshmī Pustaka Bhaṇḍāra.
- Kaviyā, Śaktidāna, and Cimanajī. Sōḍhāyaṇa: kavi kī anya racanāoṃ evaṃ vistr̥ta bhūmikā sahita. India, Sañcālaka, Rājasthāna Prācyavidyā Pratishṭhāna, 1966.
- Kaviyā, Śaktidāna (1964). Lākhīṇī (in Hindi). Thalavaṭa Prakāśana.
- Rangbhini (1965) रंगभीनी (संपादन-1965 ई.)
- Darji Mayaram ri Vaat दरजी मयाराम री वात
- Bāṅkidāsa, and Kaviyā, Śaktidāna. Kavi Mata Maṇḍaṇa: vistr̥ta jīvanī aura anya ajñāta racanāoṃ sahita. India, Jaina Brādarsa, 1983.
- Ful Saru Pankhadi (1965) फूल सारू पांखड़ी (विविधा)
- Kaviyā, Ś., Devaṛā, H. (1993). Bhagatī rī Bhāgīrathī. India: Rupama Sāhitya Saṃsthāna.
- Kavia, Shakti Dan (2000). Rajasthani Dooha Sangraha. Sahitya Akademi Publications. ISBN 978-81-260-0749-3.
- Kaviya; S.D (1 January 2010). Man-Prakas. Scientific Publishers. ISBN 978-81-7233-703-2.

== Published Research Papers ==
=== Rajasthani ===
1.	मातृभाषा में शिक्षण अर राजस्थानी	जेएनवी वि. वि. जोधपुर	1967
2.	राजस्थानी भाषा रै सवाल	ललकार	1967
3.	राजस्थानी भाषा री विशेषतावां	लाडेसर	1968
4.	लारला पच्चीस बरसां में डिंगळ काव्य	जाणकारी	1968
5.	चौमासै रौ चाव	जो. वि. वि. पत्रिका	1970
6.	करसां रौ करणधार : बलदेवराम मिर्धा	स्मारिका	1977
7.	डिंगळ कवि देवकरण इन्दोकली	चारण साहित्य	1977
8.	भक्तकवि अलूजी कविया	जागती जोत (नवम्बर)	1981
9.	भक्त कवि ईसरदासजी रा अज्ञात ग्रंथ	जागती जोत (मई)	1982
10.	पश्चिमी राजस्थान रा चारण संत कवि	चितारणी	1982
11.	राजस्थान रा तीज तिंवार	माणक (अप्रेल)	1982
12.	महात्मा ईसरदासजी	माणक (जून)	1982
13.	राज. में साहित्यकार सम्मान री परंपरा	माणक (फरवरी)	1983
14.	डिंगळ गीतां रौ सांस्कृतिक महत्व	जो. वि. वि. पत्रिका	1983
15.	राजस्थानी साहित्य में वीर रस	माणक (जनवरी)	1984
16.	सीतारामजी माटसाब : जूनी यादां	जागतीजोत (दिसम्बर)	1987
17.	जोधांणा रौ सपूत	कानसिंह परिहार अभि. ग्रंथ	1989
18.	सांस्कृतिक राजस्थान	माणक (अगस्त-सितम्बर)	1989
19.	राजस्थानी साहित्य में रांमकथा	माणक	1992
20.	प्रिथीराज राठौड़ अर डिंगळ गीत	वैचारिकी	1993
21.	राजस्थानी संस्कृति री ओळखांण	माहेश्वरी स्मारिका	1994
22.	बाला सतीमाता रूपकंवर	क्षत्रिय दर्शन	1995
23.	रंग-रंगीलै राजस्थान री संस्कृति	माणक (अप्रेल)	1997
24.	प्रेम अर प्रकृति रौ पारंगत कवि डॉ नारायणसिंह भाटी	जागती जोत (अप्रेल)	2004

=== Hindi ===
1.	सम्पत्ति का संप्रभुत्व	प्रेरणा	1959
2.	कविवर नाथूदानजी बारहठ	प्रेरणा	1959
3.	डिंगल में अफीमची आलोचना	प्रेरणा	1961
4.	आदर्श परम्परा के अवशेष	अभयदूत	1962
5.	गोविन्द विलास ग्रन्थ; एक विवेचन	प्रेरणा	1964
6.	महाकवि सूर्यमल्ल मिश्रण और निराला के वीरकाव्य का तुलनात्मक अध्ययन	जोधपुर विश्वविद्यालय पत्रिका	1958
7.	पी. एन. श्रीवास्तव के काव्य का मूल्यांकन	ललकार	1968
8.	भारतीय संस्कृति और डिंगल साहित्य	संस्कृति प्रवाह	1969
9.	मोतीसर जाति और उसका साहित्य	राजस्थान अनुशीलन	1970
10.	राजस्थान के जीवन और साहित्य का सौष्ठव	जेएनवी वि. वि. पत्रिका	1970
11.	राजस्थानी लोक साहित्य की विशेषताएं	चेतन प्रहरी	1970
12.	सूरज प्रकाश ग्रन्य; एक विवेचन	तरुण राजस्थान	1970
13.	विद्यार्थी और विद्रोह	तरुण-शक्ति	1973
14.	चारणों की कर्त्तव्यनिष्ठा और प्रतिष्ठा	चारण साहित्य (अंक-1)	1977
15.	डिंगल काव्य में गांधी वर्णन	चारण साहित्य (अंक-2)	1977
16.	राजस्थानी मर्सिया काव्य	चारण साहित्य (अंक-3)	1977
17.	राजस्थानी रामभक्ति-काव्य	चारण साहित्य (अंक-4)	1977
18.	डिंगल साहित्य में ऊर्जस्वी जीवन	कर्मठ राजस्थान	1981
19.	डिंगल शब्द की सही व्युत्पत्ति	कर्मठ राजस्थान	1981
20.	डिंगल काव्य में शोध एवं श्रृंगार का समन्वय	वरदा	1982
21.	मीरां की भक्ति साधना	वरदा	1985
22.	राजभाषा के लिए हिंदी ही क्यों?	जिंकवाणी (जनवरी)	1985
23.	रामनाथ कविया का एक पत्र	वरदा (अप्रेल-जून)	1985
24.	मारवाड़ के चारणों का ब्रजभाषा काव्य में योगदान	ब्रज अरु मारवाड़ (स्मारिका)	1986
25.	डिंगल काव्य में श्री करनी महिमा	श्री करणी षटशती	1987
26.	महाकवि दुरसा आढ़ा और उनकी अज्ञात भक्ति रचनाएं	विश्वंभरा (जनवरी-जून)	1987
27.	डिंगल भाषा में नाथ साहित्य	नाथवाणी (जु.-दिस. )	1988
28.	गौरीशंकर ओझा का एक ऐतिहासिक पत्र	वरदा (जुलाई-दिसम्बर)	1988
29.	डिंगल में संवाद काव्यों की परम्परा	वरदा (जुलाई-दिसम्बर)	1989
30.	मोडजी आशिया की अज्ञात रचनाएं	वरदा (अप्रेल-जून)	1990
31.	दुरसा आढ़ा संबंधी भ्रामक धारणाएं एवं उनका निराकरण	वरदा (अप्रेल-सितम्बर)	1991
32.	मारवाड़ के सपूत जगदीश सिंह गहलोत	राजस्थान इतिहास रत्नाकर	1991
33.	डिंगल काव्य में वीर दुर्गादास	मरु भारती (जुलाई)	1991
34.	महाराजा मानसिंह के राज्याश्रित कवियों का राजस्थानी काव्य को योगदान	स्मृति-ग्रंथ	1991
35.	चारण-क्षत्रिय संबंधों के छप्पय	राजपूत एकता (जुलाई)	2002
36.	मेहा वीठू रचित राय रूपग राणा उदैसिंहजी नूं	वरदा (अक्टूबर)	2002
37.	कुचामन ठिकाने की खूबियां	राजपूत एकता (फरवरी)	2003
38.	महाराजा मानसिंह की शरणागत वत्सलता	राजपूत एकता (जुलाई)	2004
39.	भक्तकवि ईसरदास बोगसा कृत सवैया	विश्वम्भरा (जुलाई)	2004
40.	स्मृतिशेष संत श्री हेतमरामजी महाराज	स्मारिका	2005
41.	डॉ. गंगासिंह के काव्य में सुभाषित एवं संवेदना	स्मारिका	2005
42.	महाकवि तरुण की काव्य साधना	तरुण का काव्य संसार	1994

=== Brajbhasha ===
1.	मारवाड़ के चारणन कौ ब्रजभाषा काव्य	ब्रजमंडल-स्मारिका	1986
2.	मरुभाषा कौ स्वातंत्र्योत्तर अज्ञात ब्रजभाषा काव्य	ब्रज शतदल	1991
3.	ब्रजभाषा कौ मानक रूप	ब्रज शतदल	1991
4.	जनचेतना के कवि : जसकरण खिड़िया	ब्रजभाषा साहित्यकार दरपन	1994
5.	काव्यमय पत्रन में ठा. जसकरण खिड़िया	ब्रजभाषा साहित्यकार दरपन	1994
6.	कवि ईसरदास का सर्वप्रथम ब्रजभाषा काव्य	ब्रज शतदल	1999
7.	मेड़तणी मीरां : विषपान के प्रमान	ब्रज शतदल (जनवरी)	2001
8.	दूध कौ रंग लाल हौ	ब्रज शतदल लघु नीतिकथा	2003
