= Dingal =

Ancient Indian language with literature in prose and poetry

- Old Western Rajasthani; Old Gujarati
- डिंगल • ḍiṁgala
- The word "Dingal" in Devanagari script
- Pronunciation: [ɖinɡələ]
- Native to: India; Pakistan
- Region: Rajasthan; Gujarat; Sindh; Malwa
- Era: 8th century CE; Developed into Rajasthani and Gujarati languages by 13th century CE
- Language family: Indo-European: Indo-Iranian; Indo-Aryan; Western; Dingal
- Early form: Apabhraṃśa
- Writing system: Devanagari; Mahajani

Language codes
- ISO 639-3: –

Dingal (Devnagari: डिंगल; IAST: ḍiṁgala; also spelled Dimgala), also known as Old Western Rajasthani, is an ancient Indian language written in Nagri script and having literature in prose as well as poetry. It is a language of very high tone and requires a specific style of speaking. Dingal was used in Rajasthan and adjoining areas including Gujarat, Kutch, Malwa, and Sindh. Most of Dingal literature is said to be composed by Charans. It was prominently used in composition of war poetry praising the martial exploits of Rajput and Charan war heroes.

Dingal is a New Indo-Aryan (NIA) poetic language or style. It is called by various names such as Maru-Bhasha, Marwari, and Old Western Rājasthāni. Dingal is also described as one of five "pre-modern Hindi literary dialects", listed together with Braj, Avadhi, Sadhu and Maithili. Dingal has also been called as the ancestor of Marwari and Gujarati.

== Origins and Antiquity of Dingal ==
The earliest reference of the term 'Dingal' is found in the 8th-century text Kuvalayamālā, composed by Udhyotana Sūrī. According to Dingal scholar Kaviya, Dingal came into existence by the 9th-century, derived from the Apabhramsa of Western Rajasthan, and became the literary language of the region and beyond.

The usage of the word "Dingal" is also found in "Uḍiṁgala Nāma Mālā" by the Jain poet Vācaka Kuśalābha and in "Nāga Damana" by the saint-poet Sāyājī Jhūlā, both written at the beginning of the 15th century.

According to Jhaverchand Meghani, Dingal, the Charan tongue, was developed from Apbhramsha and Prakrit. Meghani considered Dingal both as a language and poetic medium which "flowed freely between Rajasthan and Suarashtra and conformed to the contours of other phonetic tongues like Sindhi and Kutchi".

Uktiratnākara by Sādhu Sundara is not a bardic work, but a work on grammar in the form of an etymological glossary, and its chief importance lies in the fact that it throws a considerable light on the Old Mārwāri of the beginning of the seventeenth century A.D. I have shown elsewhere that the Dingaļa language of the Cāraṇas of Rajputana is ultimately but Old Mārwārī, or, to use a more comprehensive term, Old Western Rājasthāni. -L. P. Tessitori (1916)

== Vocabulary ==
An interesting feature of Dingal is that it preserves archaic words from the early medieval period which are not found anywhere else. Dingal distinguishes itself from other Northern Indo-Aryan languages since it contains older language forms and also incorporates novel grammatical and lexical constructs. Owing to its geographical origin at Western Rajasthan, Dingal vocabulary also shares words common with Sindhi, Persian, Punjabi, and Sanskrit.

Tessitori explains the archaic vocabulary of Dingal poets as follows: "The bards have been more conservative in the matter of lexicon than in the matter of grammar, and most of the poetical and archaic words which were used by them five hundred years ago, can still be used by the bards of the present day, though their meaning may be no longer intelligible to any of his hearers or readers, but the initiated. This fact of the preservation of archaic words in Ḍiṇgaḷa is easily explained by the existence of the poetical glossaries such as the Hamīranāmamālā and the Mānamañjarināmamālā, etc., and the large part they have been playing in the curriculum of the studies of the bards for the last three centuries or more. A great part of these obsolete words are borrowed from the vocabulary of the Sanskrit poetry, and it is chiefly to these that the extraordinary richness in synonyms of Ḍiṇgaḷa is ultimately due".

== Dingal and Maru Bhasha ==
Historically, the language of Western Rajasthan, was known as Dingal. The name Dingal was considered identical to Maru-Bhasha (otherwise called Marwari Bhasha, Marubhum Bhasha, etc.)

There are numerous historical examples of statements by Dingal writers which confirm the view that the spoken language of the region is also called Dingal. In Rukamaṇī Maṃgala or Haraji ro Vyanwalo, late 15th-century Akhyan Kavya text, composed by Padam Bhagat is in the spoken language. A couplet found in one of its manuscripts says:

'The language of my poem is Dingal. It does not know any metre or continuity. It consists of only divine contemplation'.

Charan saint Swarupdas in his Pandav Yashendu Chandrika, early 19th-century, says:

'My language is a mixed one. It contains Dingal, Braj, and Sanskrit, so that all may understand. I beg apology of greater poets for this.'

== Charans and Dingal ==
Although it is true that most of the Dingal literature was composed by the Charans, other castes also adopted it and made great contributions. In addition to the Charans, Dingal poetry is available in sufficient quantity by many poets of the Rajput, Pancholi (Kayastha), Motisar, Brahmin, Rawal, Jain, Muhata, and Bhat communities. Several Rajput kings wrote poems in Dingal, particularly Maharaja Man Singh Rathore (reign 1803-1843) of Marwar.

== Dingal Gīt ==
Dingal Gīt is a unique feature of Dingal and is considered to be an invention of Charans. There is an important distinction to be made about Dingal Gits. The notion that these songs were sung is misleading. Dingal Gīts were recited by Charans in a way similar to Vedic hymns. It is a unique feature of Rajasthani poetry. As doha is the most popular metre of Apabhramsa, so is Gīt for Rajasthani.

Gīts are of 120 types. Usually, In the Dingal texts of prosody, there have been 70-90 types of Gīts in usage. A Git is like a small poem. Its not to be sung but recited in "high-pitched tones in a peculiar style".

Thousands of such Gīts have been written in commemoration of historical deeds. Many of them are contemporary in relation to the historical incident and as such are known as "Sākh rī Kavitā" or the poetry of testimony.

=== Rules for composition ===
There are prosodical rules for the composition of a Gīt. They are:-

1. Jathā: a special system of poetic composition; there are 18 types of Jathā
2. Vaiṇsagāī: alliteration; it is rigidly followed; there are many types of Vaiṇsagāī
3. Ukti: a statement, the basis being the speaker, the listener and the object

Moreover, a composition has to avoid the dosas (flaws), which are peculiar to the Cāraṇ prosody and are of 11 types.

Additionally, there are 22 types of chappay, 12 types of nīsāṇī, and 23 types of dohā.

== Dictionaries of Dingal ==
These are several historical dictionaries of the Dingal language:

=== Hamir Nam-Mala by Hamir Dan Ratnu ===
Hamir Nam-Mala was written in 1774 by Hamir Dan Ratnu. Originally a resident Ghadoi village of Marwar, Hamir Dan lived in Bhuj city of Kutch for most of his life. He was a great scholar of his time and had authored several other texts including Lakhpat Pingal and Bhagvat Darpan. Hamir Nam-Mala is one of the most well known among the dictionaries of Dingal. It is also known as Harijas Nam-Mala owing to the significant presence of verses dedicated to Vishnu (i.e. Hari).

=== Dingala Kosa by Murari Dan Misran ===
Murari Dan Misran, son of Suryamall Misran and Kaviraja of Bundi State, compiled one of the dictionaries of Dingal vocabulary, called Dingala Kosa. It is the largest & most important among the dictionaries of Dingal language. He began to write from the month of Chaitra of the Vikram Samvat 1943 (1886 AD).

=== Dingal Nam-Mala by Kushal Labh ===
Dingal Nam-Mala, or Udingal Nam-Mala, is the oldest available dictionary of Dingal language. It was authored by a court-poet of Jaisalmer, Kusha Labh Jain, in 1618. The then ruler of Jaisalmer, Har Raj is also a co-author of this work.

=== Nagraj Dingal Kosa by Nagraj Pingal ===
Nagraj Dingal Kosa by Nagraj Pingal was written in 1821. Its manuscript was found in the personal collection of Panramji Motisar of Judiya village in Marwar.

=== Avdhan-Mala by Udairam Barhath ===
Avdhan-Mala was written by Udairam Barhath. He was a contemporary of Maharaja Man Singh of Marwar. Born in Thabukda village of Marwar, he lived in Bhuj city in Kutch and was a great scholar of his time. Avdhan-Mala is found amongst his other work called Kavi-Kula-Bodh.

=== Anekarthi Kosa by Udairam Barhath ===
Anekarthi Kosa is another text by Udairam Barhath which is collection of synonyms of Dingal words. Its part of Kavi-Kula-Bodh. It also sometimes includes Sanskrit words as synonyms. The whole text is written using Dohas making it easier for memorization.

=== Ekakshari Nam-Mala by Udairam Barhath ===
Another dictionary of Dingal by Udairam Barhath, part of his larger work Kavi-Kula-Bodh. Udairam has included many Sanskrit as well as words from common language aside from Dingal words.

=== Ekakshari Nam-Mala by Virbhan Ratnu ===
Ekakshari Nam-Mala is authored by Virbhan Ratnu, a resident of Marwar from the village of Ghadoi. Virbhan was a contemporary of Abhai Singh of Marwar. The text was written in 16th century.

=== Nam-Mala ===
Another dictionary of Dingal language, though its author and dating is not known. Its thought to be written in early 18th century.

=== Modern Dictionaries ===
Some modern dictionaries of the Dingal language were created by:-

1. Sir Sukhdeo Prasad Kak: Prime Minister of Jodhpur and a scholar authored a Dingal Kosa consisting of more than 60,000 words.
2. Padma Shri Sitaram Lalas: Renowned linguist and grammarian of Rajasthani authored Rajasthani Sabad Kosa, largest of all Rajasthani dictionaries with more than 2 lakh words.

== Dingal poetry ==
Dingal Poetry incorporates heroic writing on the heroes of Rajasthan, such as Prithviraj Chauhan and Prince Khoman of Mewar. It is an admixture of inter-regional languages. In Rajasthan such languages formed Pingal language (see below).

=== Thakur Nathu Singh Mahiyariya ===
He was born in a Charan family in princely state of Mewar. He wrote many books such as Veer Satsai, Hari Rani Shatak etc.

=== Babu Ramnarayan Dugar ===
Born in 1857 A.D. in an Oswal family, Babu Ramnarayan Dugar was a prominent authority on Pingal language and was a close associate of Kaviraj Shyamaldasji, the author or Vir Vinod, the official history of rulers of Mewar. In later days he was associated with M.M. Ojha. His most prominent work is Hindi translation of Nainsi ri Khyat from Dingal language to Hindi.

== Ingal ==
Ingal is an ancient Indian language, a form of Prakrit popular in Sindh and nearby areas.

== Pingal ==
Pingal is an ancient and now extinct Indian language, it was a form of Prakrit popular in Rajasthan and nearby areas. In contrast to Dingal, which was primarily a language of warlike tone, Pingal was a "language of love" and softspoken.

== See also ==
- Charan
