= Hasu Yajnik =

Gujarati novelist from India (1938–2020)

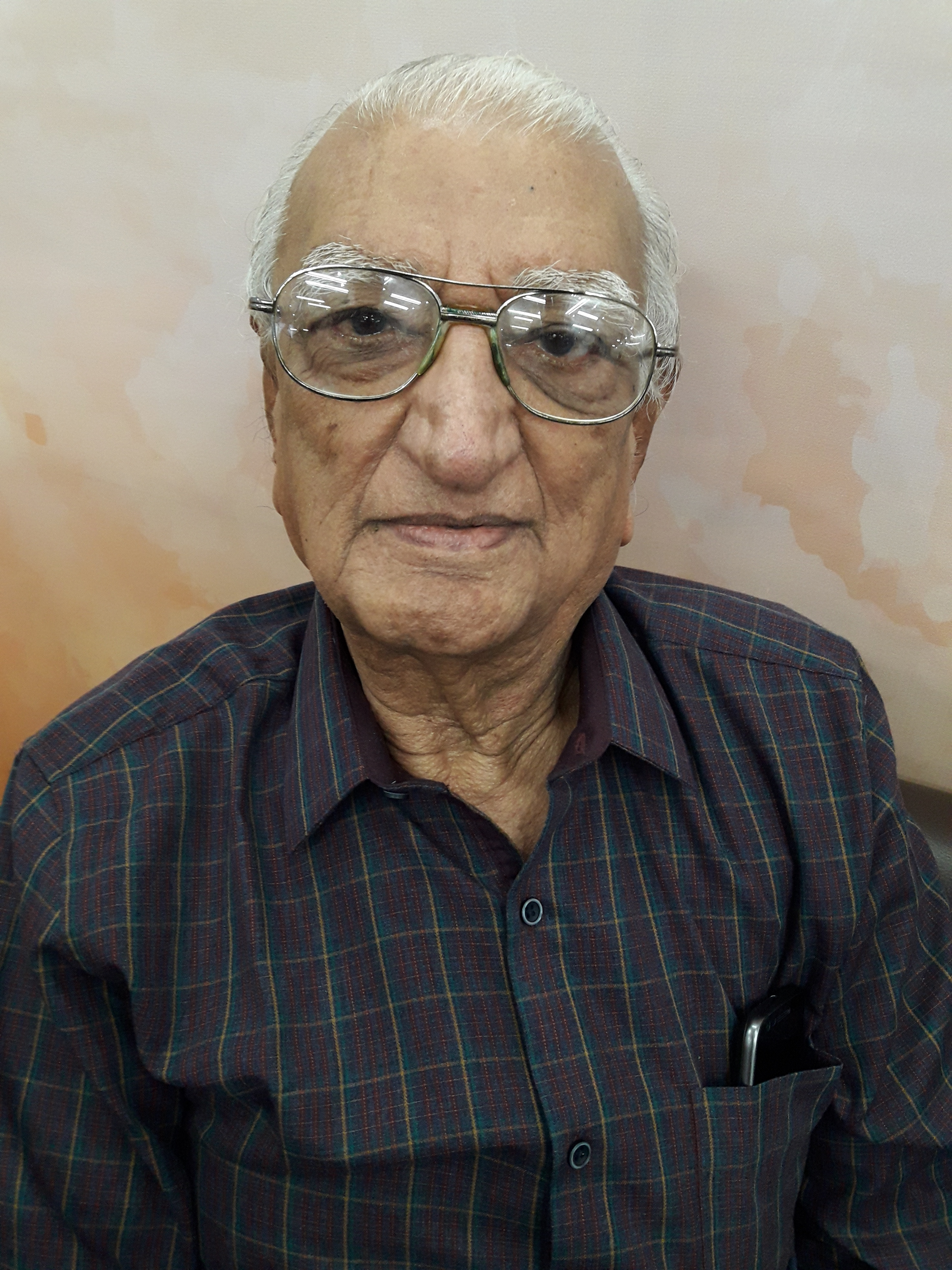
- Hasu Yajnik in November 2018 at Amdavad National Book Fair
- Born: Hasmukhray Vrajlal Yajnik; 12 February 1938; Rajkot, Rajkot State, British India
- Died: 10 December 2020 (aged 82); Ahmedabad, Gujarat, India
- Education: MA, PhD
- Alma mater: Dharmendrasinhji College, Rajkot
- Occupations: Novelist, short story writer, critic, editor, folklorist, children's writer
- Spouse: Hasumati (m. 1964)
- Children: Yuva Aiyer; Nayan Yajnik
- Writing career
- Pen name: Upamanyu, Pushpadhanva, B. Kashyap, Vajranandan Jani and Shridhar
- Language: Gujarati

Hasmukhray Vrajlal Yajnik (12 February 1938 – 10 December 2020), better known as Hasu Yajnik, also spelled Hasu Yagnik was an Indian Gujarati language novelist, short story writer, critic, editor, folklorist and children's writer. Born and educated in Rajkot, he served as a professor of Gujarati in various government colleges in Gujarat. He had written twenty novels, three short story collections, two jail stories, four medieval story collections, criticism of four medieval works, and edited twelve folk works and six works of children's literature.

== Biography ==
Yagnik was born on 12 February 1938 in Rajkot (now in Gujarat) to Vrajlal Yajnik and Pushpaben (Prasannaben). He was their eighth child. His father was clerk in British Agency in Rajkot while his grandfather Govindalal was a survey officer in Palitana State. He was raised by his grandfather and was heavily influenced by him. He completed his primary and secondary school education from Rajkot. Frem 1950 to 1954, he studied in Dhrangadhra. He completed BA in 1960 and MA in Gujarati-Sanskrit in 1962 from Dharmendrasinhji Arts College in Rajkot. He received PhD for his thesis on Madhyakalin Gujarati Kamkatha in 1972.

After MA, he joined M. P. Shah College in Surendranagar as a professor of Gujarati in 1963. He moved to M. N. College in Visnagar in 1964 and later joined Gujarat College in Ahmedabad in 1965 and served there till 1973. He also served as a professor with DKB College in Jamnagar from 1965 to 1979. He then moved to M. P. Shah College in Surendranagar in 1979 to 1982. He served as the registrar of the Gujarat Sahitya Akademi, Gandhinagar from 1982 to 1996 and retired. He was a founder and managing trustee of the Meghani Lokvidya Sanshodhan Bhavan, Ahmedabad from 1996 to 2005.

He died on 10 December 2020 in Ahmedabad due to COVID-19.

== Works ==
Yajnik had written under various pen names: Upamanyu, Pushpadhanva, B. Kashyap, Vajranandan Jani and Shridhar. He had written twenty novels, three short story collections, two jail stories, four medieval stories, criticism of four medieval works, edited twelve folk works and six works of children's literature. His first short story "Lapsi" was published in 1954.

His populist novels with simple themes and language include Dagdha (1968), Highway Par Ek Rat (1981), Biji Savarno Sooraj (1982), Sol Pachhi (1986), Neera Kausani (1987). Diwal Pachhalni Duniya is a collection of 28 semi-fictionalised true stories. Mandani Maya (1985), Ek Jubanimanthi (1985) and Pachhitna Paththaro (1985) are his short story collections.

Madhyakalin Gujarati Premkatha (1974), Madhyakalin Kathasahitya (1987), Shamal (1978, on Shamal Bhatt) and Sanskrit Kathasahitya (1997) are his research works. Kamkatha (1987) includes stories of Gujarati females from medieval Sanskrit Prakrit works while Kamkatha:Suda Bahontari (1987) has stories of female characters.

Futati Pankhono Pahelo Fafadat (1972) is co-edited by him. Gujarati Lokkathao (1996), Saurabh Vratkathao (1996), Saurabh Navrat Garba (1996), Saurabh Lagnageet Sangrah (1999), Saurabh Padabhajanavali (1999), Lagnollas (2001) are folk literature collections edited by him.

He had notated traditional devotional songs edited by Harivallabh Bhayani in Hari Ven Vay Chhe Re Ho Vanma (1988). He has also notated Gokulma Tahukya Mor (1989) and Jharmar Meh Jhabooke Veej (1989).

He had also written some works on music: Violin-vadan (1992), Ragdarshan (1993), Harmonium-vadan (1997), Bansari-vadan (1998). His Krishnacharit and Ramkatha are translated in Marathi, Odia and Hindi.

== Awards ==
Yajnik had received a silver medal from Dharmendrasinhji College for his short stories in 1954. His Diwal Pachhalni Duniya received a prize from the Gujarati Sahitya Parishad. He also received an award from the Skylark, London (1994) and a fellowship from the Gujarati Sahitya Academy, London (1997). He was the recipient of Kavi Kag Award in 2011. He also received the first prize from the Gujarat Sahitya Akademi for his work Gujaratni Lokvidya.

== Personal life ==
Yajnik married Hasumati Vanravandas Dave in 1964. Their daughter Yuva Aiyer was born in the same year. Nayan Yajnik is their son.

== See also ==
- List of Gujarati-language writers
