= Motisar (caste) =

Community in Rajasthan and Gujarat

Motisar is an Indian community from Rajasthan and Gujarat known for composing folk-poetry. They were patronised by the Charans.

== Origin ==
Motisars claim they were originally Rajputs of Jhala, Khichi, Parihar and other clans, who became devotees and worshippers of Avad Mata. The goddess Avad granted these devotees the divine gift of poetry.

== History ==
Motisars functioned as one of the genealogist castes for the Charans. They also composed poems and praised them.

In the past, Motisars would leave their homes after Dussehra and visit the villages of Charans who patronised them. They received gifts and returned home after four to six months.

== See also ==
- Rawal
