= Onkar Singh Lakhawat =

Member of Parliament, Rajya Sabha (b. 1949)

Chairman of Rajasthan Heritage Conservation and Promotion Authority (RHCPA) Government of Rajasthan
- Incumbent
- Assumed office February 2024
- Chief Minister: Bhajanlal Sharma
- Preceded by: Surendra Singh Jadawat
- In office 2014-2019
- Chief Minister: Vasundhara Raje
- Succeeded by: Surendra Singh Jadawat
- In office 2007-2008
- Chief Minister: Vasundhara Raje

Minister of State
- In office 2014-2019

Member of Parliament, Rajya Sabha
- In office 1997-2000
- Preceded by: Mahesh Chandra Sharma
- Succeeded by: Santosh Bagrodia
- Constituency: Rajasthan

Personal details
- Born: 1 April 1949 (age 77) Tehla, Nagaur, Rajasthan
- Party: Bharatiya Janata Party
- Children: 3
- Education: Bachelor of Arts; Bachelor of Legislative Law
- Occupation: Advocate; Politician; Writer
- Known for: Rajasthan Heritage Conservation and Development
- Awards: Kavi Kag Award (2014)
- Website: Onkar Singh Lakhawat on X

Onkar Singh Lakhawat
- Writing career
- Notable works: Naharidas Barhath; Hinglaj Shaktipeeth; Bol Sansad Bol-Yug Charan Bankar Bol

Onkar Singh Lakhawat (born 1 April 1949) is an Indian lawyer, politician, writer, and a senior BJP leader from Rajasthan. He is serving as the Chairman of Rajasthan Heritage Conservation and Promotion Authority. He is a former Member of Parliament in the Rajya Sabha (1997–2000). He was a Minister of State in the Second Raje ministry (2014–2019). He was also the vice-president of the BJP in Rajasthan.

== Early life and family ==
Onkar Singh Lakhawat was born 1 April 1949 in Tehla village in Nagaur, Rajasthan. His parents were Shri Ash Karanji (father) and mother Shri Ratan Kanwar (mother). Onkar Singh is married and has 1 son and 2 daughters. He was married on 1 July 1964.

== Education ==
Onkar Singh Lakhawat has done graduation in Bachelor of Arts(B.A.) as well as obtained a degree in Bachelor of Legislative Law(LL.B.).

== Political career ==
Lakhawat came in contact with Rashtriya Swayamsevak Sangh in his early years during his graduation in Deedwana. It continued in Ajmer where he was pursuing his degree in law. He also worked for some time in Janata Party. When BJP was established in 1980, Onkar Singh Lakhawat was appointed as the first General Secretary of BJP in Ajmer. Onkar Singh attended the Delhi conference of BJP's formation. He was later appointed as State President of BJYM.

Onkar Singh Lakhawat has held various positions in the government of Rajasthan, including UIT Chairman of Ajmer (1994–1997), Member of Parliament in Rajya Sabha (1997–2000), Chairman of Rajasthan Heritage Protection and Promotion Authority (2007-2008) (2014–2019), Minister of State (2015), and member of the Disciplinary Committee of BJP Rajasthan (2020). He also planned tours of Prime Minister Narendra Modi during Lok Sabha elections in 2019 and was a panelist in TV debates. In June 2020, BJP fielded him for the election of 3 vacant seats of Rajya Sabha.

== Positions held ==
Position	Organization	Term
General Secretary	Bhartiya Janata Party Ajmer	1980
State President	BJYM	
Chairman	Urban Improvement Trust	1994-1997
Member of Parliament	Rajya Sabha	16 October 1997 – 2 April 2000
Vice President	Bhartiya Janata Party Rajasthan	2005
Chairman	Rajasthan Heritage Conservation and Promotion Authority	(2007–2008) (2014–2019)
Minister of State	Government of Rajasthan	2015
Member	Disciplinary Committee BJP	2020

== Monuments and panoramas ==
Onkar Singh Lakhawat, in his long career, is known for spearheading the construction of monuments and panoramas dedicated to local heroes & folk deities of Rajasthan. Till now, he has presided over the building of more than 75 such panoramas and monuments.

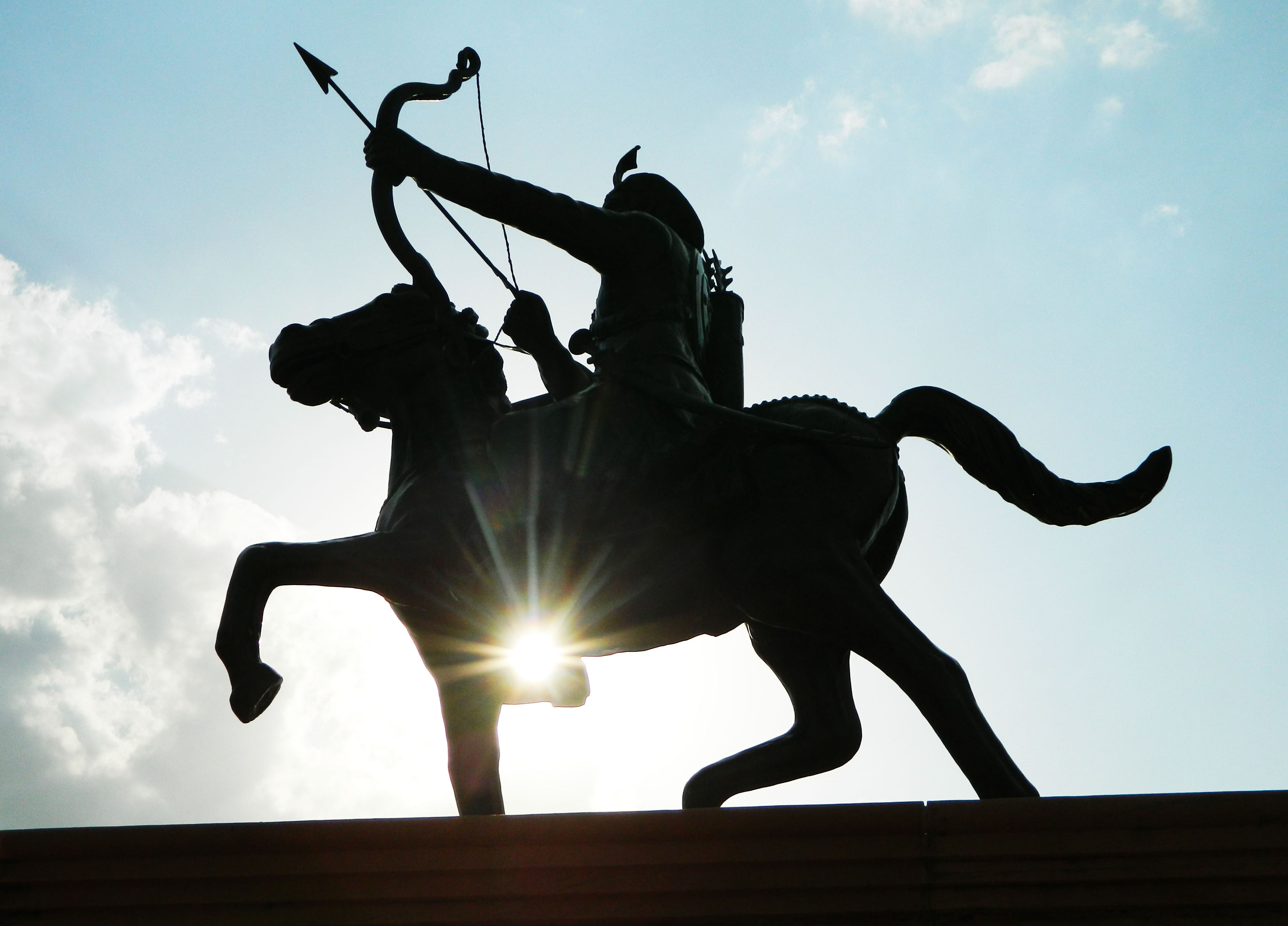
Prithviraj Chauhan Memorial, Ajmer

=== Pritviraj Chauhan Memorial Park, Ajmer 1996 ===
After his appointment as Ajmer UIT Chairman, Onkar Singh took the decision to build a monument dedicated to Prithviraj Chauhan.

Onkar Singh Lakhawat, Chairman of the Urban Improvement Trust (Ajmer), established a memorial park in Ajmer to commemorate Prithiviraj Chauhan. The opening ceremony, attended by prominent political figures including the then national president of BJP, L K Advani, was held on 1996-01-25. The park is located at a prominent location on a tall hill leading to Taragarh fort, providing a panoramic view of the city. It covers an area of approximately 3 acres. The centerpiece is a bronze statue of Prithviraj seated on a horse, which is approximately life-sized but elevated on an 11.6 foot-high stone plinth.

=== Daher Sen Statue ===
Lakhawat also built a panorama dedicated to Raja Daher Sen, an old ruler of Sindh.

Since 2018, Onkar Singh Lakhawat, as the chairman of Rajasthan Heritage Preservation and Promotion Authority, oversaw the construction of around 50 statues of various local heroes, freedom fighters, and folk deities of Rajasthan.

In May 2018, Vasundhara Raje, then the Chief Minister of Rajasthan, met with Onkar Singh Lakhawat, Chairman of Rajasthan Heritage Protection and Promotion Authority and directed to speed up the pace for the installation of panoramas of great saints and heroes of various communities of Rajasthan. Onkar Singh assured the chied minister regarding installation of panoramas. Onkar Singh said:

"The government is committed to restoring the memory of all revered persons from the state. There have been many who have not got their justified space in History and our effort is to correct that."

=== Tejaji Panorama ===
Tejaji is a folk deity worshipped widely in Rajasthan by communities like Jats, and the Rajasthan Heritage Protection and Promotion Authority has built a panorama of Tejaji at Kharnal Village in Nagour district. Kharnal is the birthplace of Tejaji and the devotees go there to offer prayers.

=== Ramdevji Panorama ===
Worshipped primarily by the Scheduled Caste community, the Rajasthan Heritage Protection and Promotion Authority built a panorama of Ramdev ji, also known as Ramdev Baba, in Ramdevra Village of Jaisalmer District. Ramdev Baba has a huge following among the ST/SC community.

=== Pabuji Statue and Panorama ===
Similarly, with the camel-herding communities like Raika and Rebari, which worship Pabuji Rathore. The folk-deity's statue and panorama have been placed in Jodhpur's Kolu Village. Pabuji is also popular among people from the Schedule Caste.

=== Amar Singh Rathore Panorama ===
A panorama of Mughal-era ruler Amar Singh Rathore, who had defied the might of Shah Jahan at the royal court in Agra, has been placed in Nagaur. Amar Singh Rathore is seen as an icon of bravery and freedom by the Rajputs, a major caste in Rajasthan. Every year, the Rajput community celebrates his birth day in Nagour.

=== Hasan Khan Mewati Panorama ===
In Alwar, the Rajasthan Heritage Protection and Promotion Authority has erected panoramas of Hasan Khan Mewati, a freedom fighter from the Meo community.

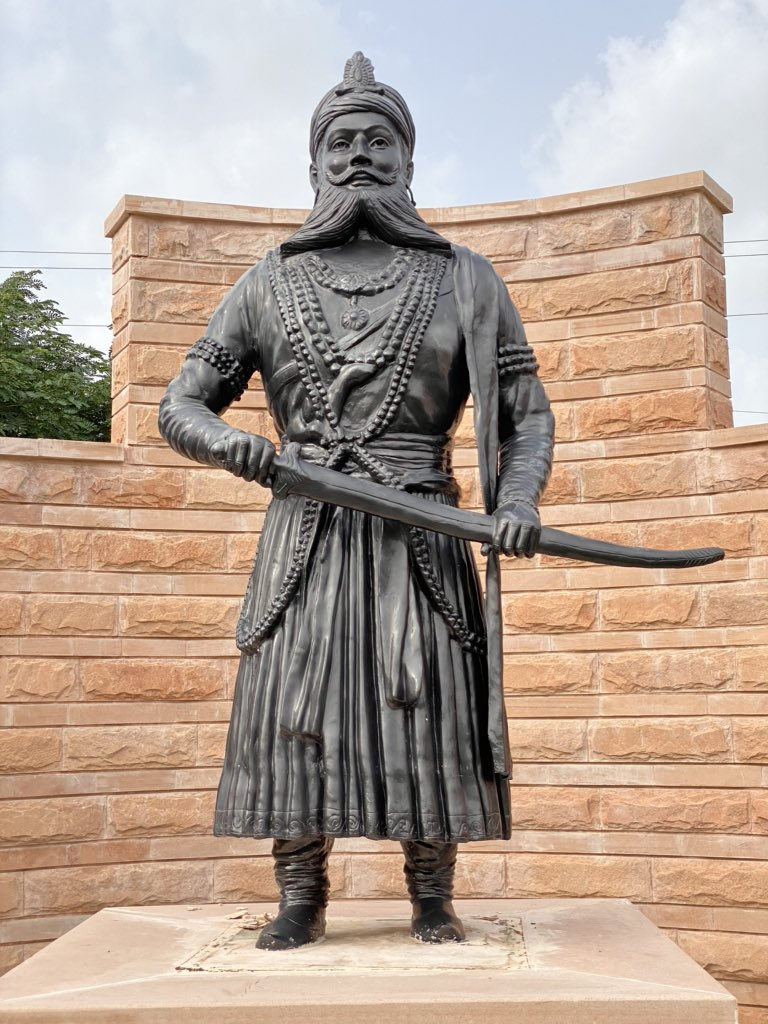
Kushal Singh of Auwa

=== Thakur Kushal Singh and Sugali Mata ===
Catering to local sentiment, a replica of the ancient statue of Sugali Mata, the goddess with 54 arms, the protector or Auwa fort was also installed. The original statue was damaged by the British and presently is lying in the Pali Museum. Further a statue of Thakur Kushal Singh, who had led the revolt, was also unveiled. Onkar Singh Lakhawat said:

"There has been gross disregard of national heroes and it needs to be set right. Their contribution cannot be ignored by terming them feudal or royal."

Other panoramas include those of legendary saints such as Meera Bai, Sant Ravidas and Sant Bhagat Peepa. Regarding the allegations of the Congress opposition on BJP using the paronamas as caste symbols for vote bank politics, Onkar Singh Lakhawat refuted these allegations, saying that

"the BJP is only trying to pay tribute to the unsung heroes through the panoramas."

== Controversies ==
In February 2016, Onkar Singh inaugurated an exhibition on Mahatma Gandhi held at Albert Hall Museum in Jaipur.

=== Gorakh-dhandha word ===
Lakhawat criticised the usage of the word 'Gorakh-Dhandha'(Gorakh-business) for indicating illegal activities. He explained that the it hurts the feelings of the devotees Hindu saint Gorakhnath, who is worshipped by millions of devotees all over India. In 2018, BJP in its election manifesto, promised to censor the usage of the word 'Gorakh-dhandha'.

=== Ram Mandir statement ===
In October 2018, Onkar Singh Lakhawat made a statement replying to the comment on the Ram Mandir by the Congress leader Shashi Tharoor that it is offensive to the Hindus that hundreds of years of struggle to reclaim the Ram Temple land is trivialised as Tharoor termed that "Good Hindus" won't accept any temple built after levelling others' religious site. Lakhawat told reporters that the Congress Party members are making contradictory statements over Ram Mandir while "temple tourism" is being done by top Congress leaders.

=== CAA Bill ===
During December 2019, Onkar Singh Lakhawat was vocal regarding anti-CAA protests by the opposition parties in India. He targeted Congress, saying that the Congress wanted to make a vote bank out of the illegal immigrants from Bangladesh, Afghanistan, and Pakistan. He further remarked that even though Congress is protesting against Citizenship Amendment Bill, it hasn't yet clarified its stance regarding the citizenship of illegal foreign nationals living in India.

== Authorship ==
He is author of the following books on culture and history of Rajasthan:-

- Lakhawat, Onkar Singh (2003). Bārahaṭha Naraharidāsa (in Hindi). Sahitya Akademi. ISBN 978-81-260-1613-6.
- Lakhawat, Onkar Singh (2011). Hiṅgalāja śaktipīṭha (in Hindi). Tīrtha Palace Prakāśana. ISBN 978-81-920932-0-8.
- Lakhawat, Onkar Singh (2011). Bola Sāṃsada Bola: Yuga Cāraṇa Banakara Bola (in Hindi). Tīrtha Palace Prakāśana. ISBN 978-81-920932-1-5.
- Lakhawat, Onkar Singh (2012). Samsara ka siramaura Sindha aura Maharaja Dahara Sena (in Hindi). Tīrtha Palace Prakāśana. ISBN 978-81-920932-3-9.
- Lakhawat, Onkar Singh (2012). Svātaṃtrya Rājasūya Yajña meṃ Bārahaṭha Parivāra kī mahāna āhūti (in Hindi). ISBN 978-81-920932-5-3.
- Lakhawat, Onkar Singh (2012). Rājala Akabara kā Navaroja Diyo Chuḍaāya (in Hindi). Tīrtha Pailesa Prakāśana. ISBN 978-81-920932-2-2.
- Jay Awad Aashapura
- Swatantrya Veer Govind Guru aur Vanvasiyon ka Balidan

== Awards ==
- Kavi Kag Award, 2014
