= Gujarati Literary Academy =

- Predecessor: Gujrati Sahitya Mandal
- Formation: February 12, 1977; 49 years ago
- Type: NGO
- Headquarters: London
- President: Vipool Kalyani
- Website: http://glauk.org

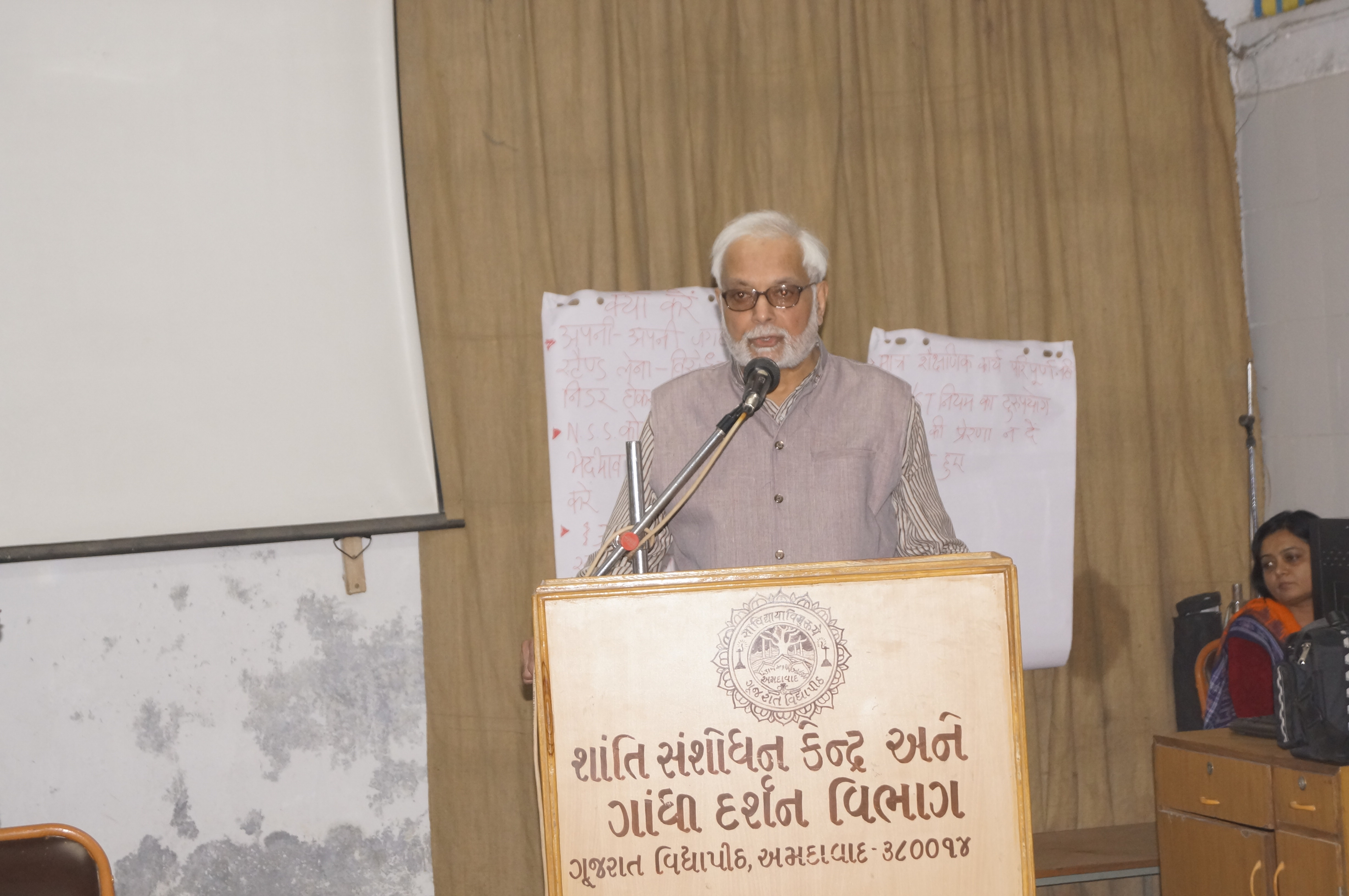
Vipool Kalyani, the incumbent president

The Gujarati Literary Academy (GLA), previously Gujarati Sahitya Mandal, is a charity based and registered in the UK and a membership organisation, open to all, whose stated aim is "to promote the study, use and enjoyment of Gujarati Literature and language by the diaspora Gujarati writers and poets from all over the world, without attaching any significance to caste, religion, sects or perceived national differences". It is also otherwise known as the Gujarati Sahitya Academy, not to be confused with the Gujarat State government's Gujarat Sahitya Academy in India.

The academy was founded in London on 12 February 1977, by winding up the then successful group ‘Gujrati Sahitya Mandal’, which was run by Dahyabhai Patel as president and Yogesh Patel as its secretary, to forge ahead with even greater ambitions, including the project of delivery of Gujarati language and literature courses outside India. Its first president was late Kavi Dahyabhai Patel. Since Vipool Kalyani took the reins as its secretary general, the academy moved forward with great vision and activities.{{Fact}} Its current president is Vipool Kalyani, who is one of the founding members of the organisation and is a renowned journalist who has been editing 'Opinion', a Gujarati journal. Mrs. Bhadra Vadgama is its secretary general, who is also a translator of Gujrati literary works and a librarian of repute.

The GLA publishes irregularly its journal Ashmita, and some anthologies from time to time. It has also published Gujarati Language text books for its courses and examinations. The GLA examination programme was recognized by the Gujarat State Government, and the decree was signed by the then Gujarat Minister of Education, Mr Karshandas Soneri.

The GLA has organized countless events over the years. The speakers have included hundreds of well known literary names in the Gujarati literature, including Umashankar Joshi, Darshak, Niranjan Bhagat, Raghuvir Chowdhury, Yashwant Shukla, Chief minister of Gujarat Late Chimanbhai Patel, and many more. A former UK Education Minister Rhodes Boyson, Keith Vaz MP, Lord Desai, Lord Dholakia, Lord Parekh, and many others also have spoken from its platform.

The society also organises several competitions, including its short story competition for the diaspora Gujarati writers.

== Past presidents ==
- Late Kavi Dahyabhai Patel
- Balwant Nayak
- Yogesh Patel
- Popatlal Jariwala
- Vallabh Nadha
- Bhadra Vadgama
- Dr. Anil Kagalwala

== See also ==
- Manipuri Sahitya Parishad
- Sahitya Akademi
