= Bhikhudan Gadhvi =

Indian folk singer (born 1948)

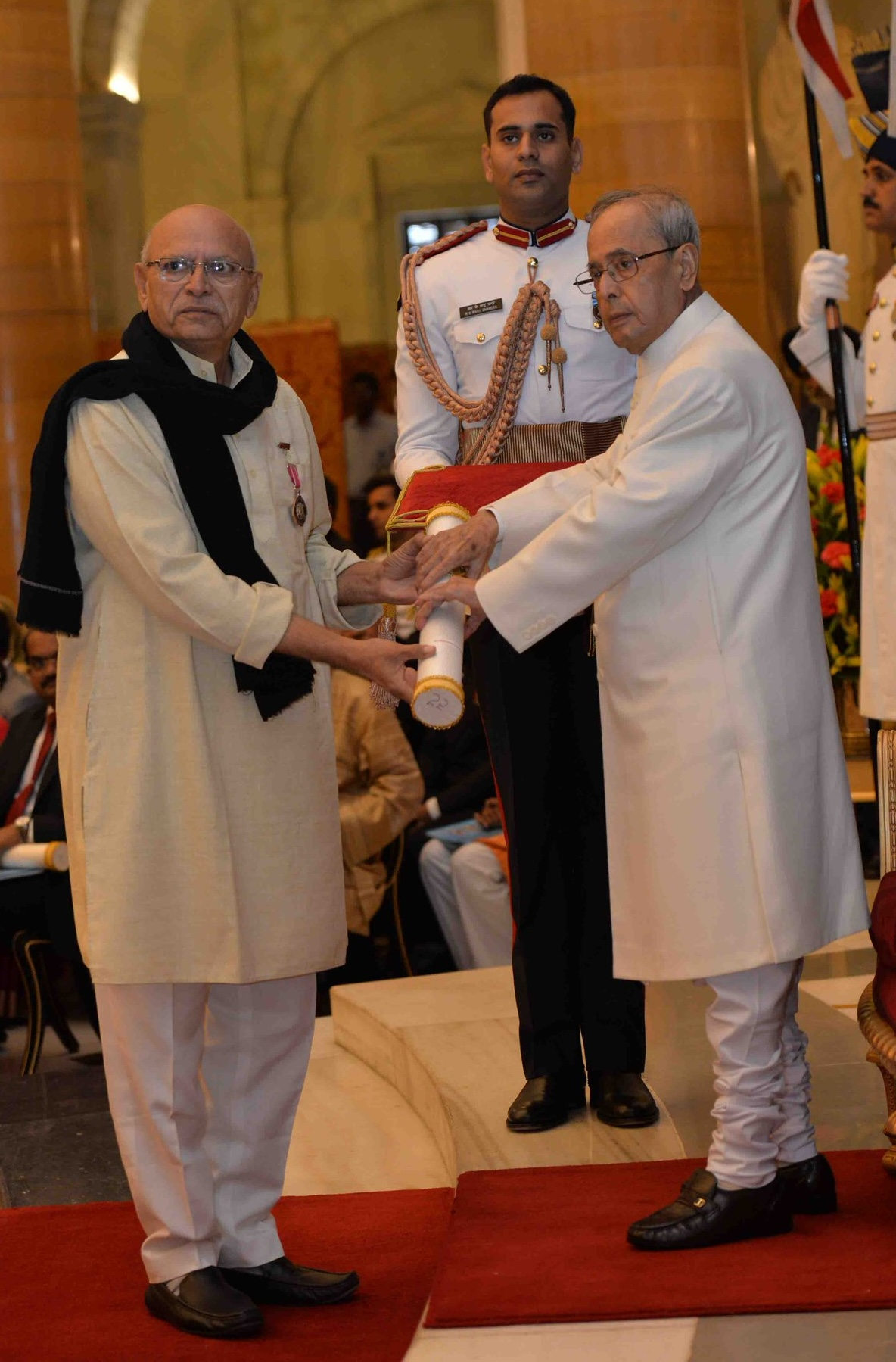
- Born: 19 September 1948 (age 78); Gujarat, India
- Occupations: Folk singer Song writer
- Known for: Gujarati folk music
- Spouse: Gajraba
- Children: Three daughters (Anjana, Meena, Hiral) and one son (Bharat)
- Awards: Padma Shri; Sangeet Natak Akademi Award; Gujarat Gaurav Award; Shri Dula Bhaya Kag Award

Bhikhudan Govindbhai Gadhvi (born 1948) is an Indian folk singer and songwriter, known as a proponent of Dayro, a narrative singing tradition of Gujarat. He is a recipient of the Gujarat Gaurav Award of the Government of Gujarat and the Sangeet Natak Akademi Award. The Government of India awarded him the fourth highest civilian honour of the Padma Shri, in 2016, for his contributions to folk music.

== Biography ==
Bhikhudan Gadhvi was born on 19 September 1948 in Khijdad, a village in Porbandar district of the Indian state of Gujarat. He started singing at the age of ten and after completing his secondary school education, he made his debut as a singer at the age of 20. Reading the works of Jhaverchand Meghani and Dula Bhaya Kag early in his life is reported to have inspired Gadhvi to take up song writing and he focused on Dayro tradition, a folk music tradition of Gujarat where the performer sings narrative stories. He has since performed in many countries such as the US, UK and Indonesia and has over 350 audio albums to credit which include popular tracks like Bhadanu Makan and Khandaninu Khamir.

Gadhvi received the Gujarat Gaurav Award of the Government of Gujarat before the Sangeet Natak Akademi awarded him the Akademi Puraskar in 2009. The Government of India included him the Republic Day honors list for the civilian honor of the Padma Shri in 2016. He is also a recipient of the Shri Dula Bhaya Kag Award in 2009. He is married to Gajraba, and they have three daughters, Anjana, Meena, Hiral, and a son, Bharatbhai. The family lives in Junagadh in Gujarat.

== Selected discography ==
- Bhikhudan Gadhvi, Hamir Gadhvi, Hemant Chauhan, Rohit P. Rathod, Prabhat Barot, Muldas Rathod. Bhikhudan Gandhvi Sankriti (MP3 CD). T Series. ASIN B00IZZ09VW.
- Bhikhudan Gadhvi (2007). Sheth Sagalsha-Lokvarta (Audio CD). T Series. ASIN B001PEU54G.
- Bhikhudan Gadhvi, Kanji Bhuta Barot, Magan Vada, Rohit P. Rathod, Nanji Bhai Makwana, Popatgiri Bapu (2014). Katha Bhakti Ras (MP3 CD). T Series. ASIN B00KQHIQSU.

== See also ==
- Music of Gujarat
- Charan
- Jhaverchand Meghani
- Dula Bhaya Kag
