= Chandra Prakash Deval =

Indian writer and translator (born 1949)

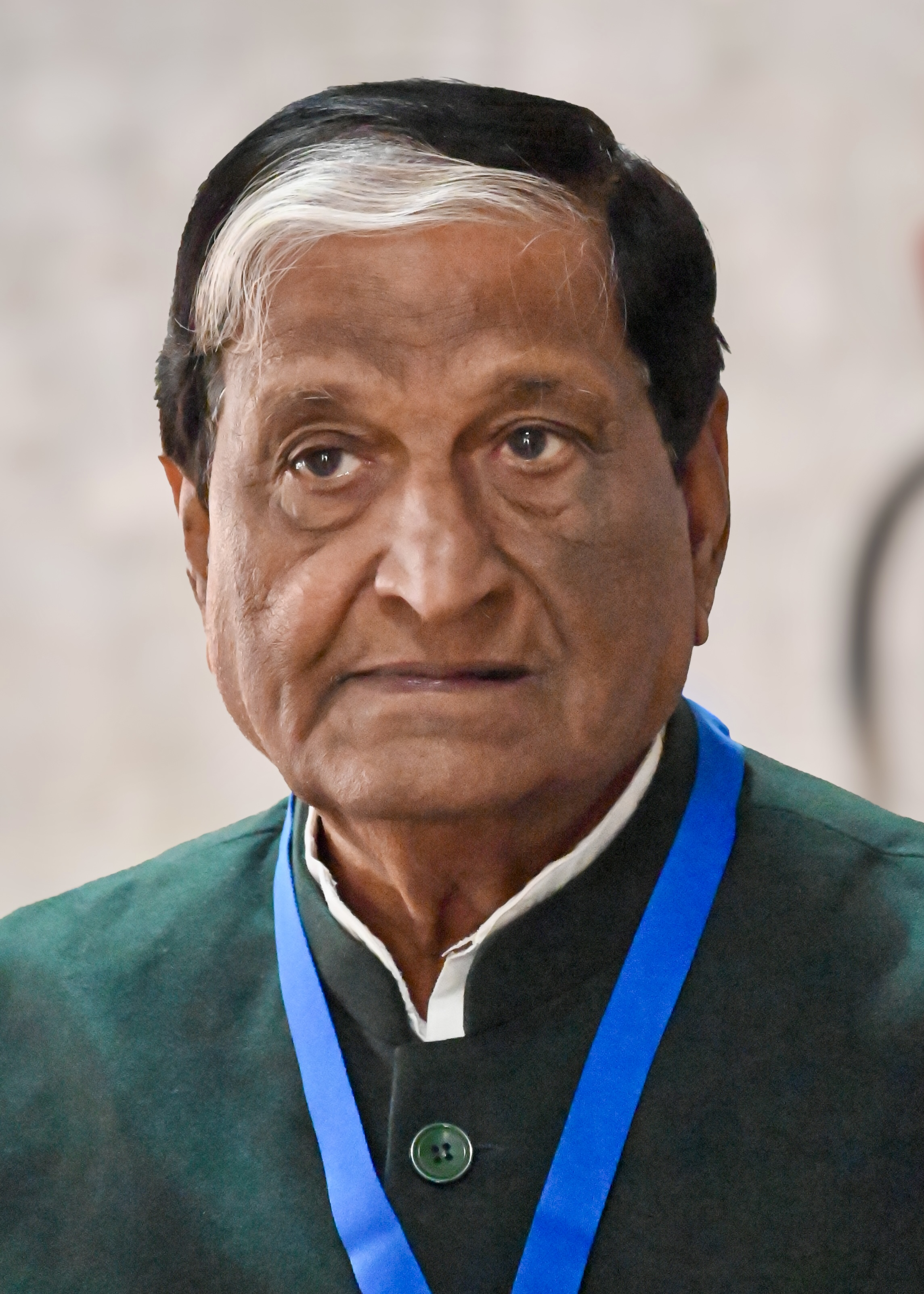
Chandar Prakash Deval in 2025

Chandra Prakash Deval is a Rajasthani poet and translator. He is also the convener of Rajasthani Advisory Council of Sahitya Akademi.

== Translations ==
He has translated Bengali, Oriya, Gujarati, Hindi and Punjabi poems and books into Rajasthani. He has also translated Russian novelist Fyodor Dostoyevsky’s "Crime and Punishment" and Samuel Beckett’s play "Waiting for Godot".

Some of his poems are: "Pachhatava", "Mrityu Kisi ko Darati Nahin", "Mrityu se Mat Bhago" and "Vipathaga".

== Awards ==
He has received Padma Shri in 2011 which happens to be the fourth highest civil honour given by the government of India. He has been awarded by Sahitya Akademi, Delhi for his poetry "Paagi" in 1979. He also has been awarded by Matrishri Kamal Goenka Rajasthani Literature award in 2009 for his poetry "Jhuravo" and his service to the Rajasthani literature. He has been conferred with the prestigious 23rd Bihari Puraskar for his poetic work 'Hirna ! Maun Saadh Van Charna' in the year 2013. For his literary contributions, Deval was awarded the 2019 Kavi Kag Award. He was also a recipient of Suryamal Mishran Shikhar Award (2004–05) for his work 'Udeek Puran'.
