= University Granth Nirman Board =

Indian book publishing firm in Gujarat

- યુનિવર્સિટી ગ્રંથનિર્માણ બોર્ડ
- Official logo of UGNB

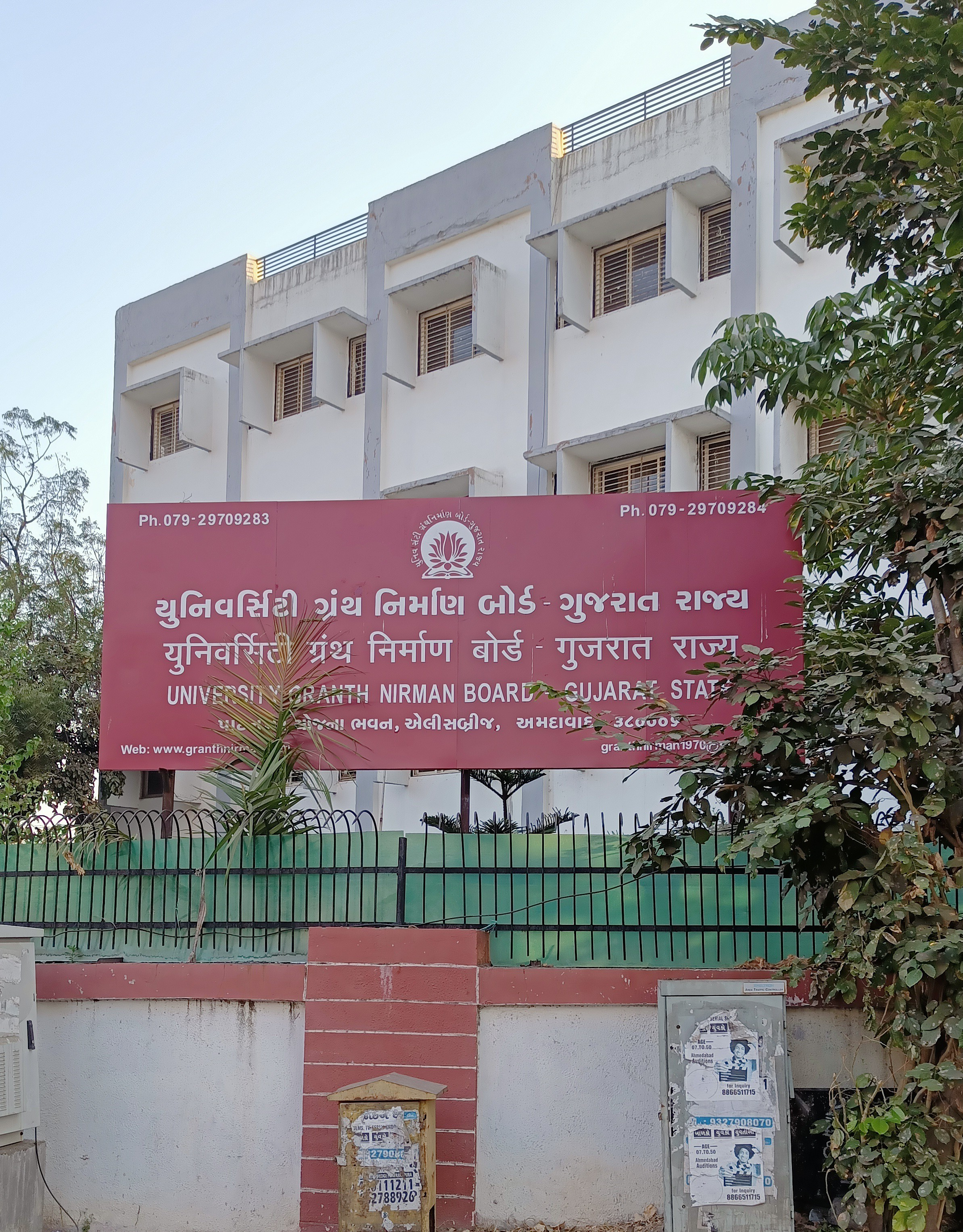
- Building of the University Granth Nirman Board
- Abbreviation: UGNB
- Formation: 1970
- Founder: Government of India
- Type: Break-even
- Legal status: Foundation
- Purpose: Publication of reference books
- Location: Ahmedabad, Gujarat, India
- Coordinates: 23.0205°N 72.5610°E
- Fields: Education
- Official language: Gujarati
- Owner: Government of Gujarat
- Chairperson: Jitu Vaghani
- Vice Chairperson: Nagarajan M.
- Funding: Government of Gujarat
- Website: Official website

The University Granth Nirman Board (UGNB), also known as the Gujarat State University Granth Nirman Board (GSUGNB), is a book-publishing firm in Ahmedabad, Gujarat, which publishes reference works at a break-even prices.

In 2016, the organization was accused of corruption by the National Students' Union of India.

== Organisation ==
The education minister of Gujarat is the chair-person of UGNB. The general body includes vice chancellors of all state universities, directors of various government departments, seven nominated members who are educationalists associated with higher education and three members from the book publishing and selling industry.

== History ==
When a national scheme to promote regional languages and introduce them as a medium of education and research at University level was introduced, the Government of India established the Granth Nirman Board in every state. Accordingly, University Granth Nirman Board was established in 1970 at Ahmedabad, Gujarat. Initially, the Government of India granted it funds to publish book but since 1976, the Government of Gujarat bears its administrative costs.

== Publications ==
The Board publishes reference books for courses in various fields which are taught at university level in the state. These reference books are prepared by the experts in the relevant fields. As these books are published for students, they are kept inexpensive.

The UGNB publishes books in Gujarati at a break-even prices for university and college students. By 2015, it has published over 1485 books in the humanities, social sciences, basic sciences, applied sciences, law, education, agriculture, animal husbandry and veterinary sciences, journalism, commerce and management, as well as dictionaries.

In 2011, UGNB published trilingual terminological dictionaries in 33 subjects. In 2014, it published an illustrated "coffee-table" version of Meghadūta, a lyric poem by Kālidāsa, with translations in five Indian languages: Sanskrit, Hindi, Gujarati, English and Marathi.

== Controversies ==
The Indian National Congress (INC) protested and asked for recall of Gujarat ni Rajkiya Gatha (The political history of Gujarat) published by the Board. The INC cited inaccuracies in the book for the reason. The National Students' Union of India (NSUI) accused the Board of corruption in purchase of a car and using funds for activities other than publishing. The Board had denied the accusations.
