= Mathania, Jodhpur =

Mathania Marwar Mathania
- Village
- Location within Rajasthan
- Coordinates: 26.5307629°N 72.9785353°E
- Country: India
- State: Rajasthan
- District: Jodhpur District

Government
  - Sarpanch: Om Prakash Solanki
  - up-Sarpanch: Jetha Ram Halu

Marwar Mathania is a village in Jodhpur district of Rajasthan, India.

Mathania is popular for its red chillies.

== Transportation ==
Mathania is connected to the city of Jodhpur via the Jodhpur-Phalodi state highway and other public transportation services, such as the train service constructed during British rule. Jodhpur Junction railway station is 38 km to the south and Osiyan Railway Station.

Mathania is 38 km away from Jodhpur Airport.

== Infrastructure ==
The village is divided into several neighbourhoods: Chopasani Charanan; Tinwari; Ummed nagar; Rampura; Kotra; Rajasthani; Bhaiser and Jud. The village has several government offices, such as: a Nagar Palika; a patwar bhawan; a post office; a police station; an electric board and the BSNL telephone exchange. Mathania also has a hospital, the 'Government satellite Hospital' and a clinic, the 'Government Ayurveda Dispensary'. Karni Mata Temple
