= Jhaverchand Meghani Award =

Literary honour in India

- Awarded for: Contributions in the field of Gujarati Folk literature
- Location: Rajkot
- Presented by: Jhaverchand Meghani Lok Sahitya Kendra (Jhaverchand Meghani Folk Literature Center), Saurastra University,
- First award: 2012
- Final award: 2018
- Currently held by: Jayanand Joshi

Jhaverchand Meghani Award (Gujarati: ઝવેરચંદ મેઘાણી પુરસ્કાર) or Jhaverchand Meghani Folklore Award (Gujarati: ઝવેરચંદ મેઘાણી લોકસાહિત્ય પુરસ્કાર) is a literary award which is given for notable contribution to the Gujarati folk literature. Named after Gujarati author Jhaverchand Meghani, the award was established by Jhaverchand Meghani Lok Sahitya Kendra (Jhaverchand Meghani Folk Literature Center), Saurastra University, Rajkot.

The winner of the award is given cash prize of ₹ 100,000 and citation.

== Awardees ==
From 2012, this award is given to prominent contributors in the field of Gujarati Folk Literature.

Year	Winner
2012	Bhagwandas Patel
2013	Hasu Yajnik
2014	Shantibhai Acharya
2015	Joravarsinh Jadav
2016	Shivadan Gadhavi
2017	Balwant Jani
2018	Jayanand Joshi
