= Pingalshi Meghanand Gadhvi =

Gujarati folklorist, singer and writer (1914–1998)

- Born: Pingalshi Meghanand Gadhvi; 27 July 1914; Chhatrava, British India (now in Porbandar district, Gujarat, India)
- Died: 31 May 1998 (aged 83); Jamnagar, Gujarat, India
- Occupations: Folklorist; Singer; Writer; Scholar
- Writing career
- Language: Gujarati
- Genre: Charan literature
- Subjects: Gujarati literature
- Notable awards: Sangeet Natak Akademi award (1990)

Pingalshi Meghanand Gadhvi (27 July 1914 – 31 May 1998) was a Gujarati folklorist, writer, singer and proponent of Charan literature from Saurashtra. Throughout his lengthy career, Gadhavi made significant contributions to the preservation and promotion of Gujarat's folklore and folk music as both a performer and scholar.

== Biography ==
Pingalshi was born on 27 July 1914 in Chhatrava village near Junagadh, Gujarat, British India. Under the tutelage of his father, Meghanand Gadhavi, and elder brother, Merubha Gadhavi, Pingalashi Gadhavi received an initiation in folklore and singing. Throughout his lengthy career, Pingalashi made significant contributions to the preservation and promotion of Gujarat's folklore and folk music as both a performer and scholar. He conducted meticulous research, mentored students, and delivered captivating performances.

He wrote folk literature in various genres and was featured regularly on Gujarati television channels and radio shows. He died on 31 May 1998 in Jamnagar in Gujarat.

=== Positions held ===
Position	Organization	Term
Principal	Folklore Institute, Junagadh	1955—1966
Member	Gujarat State Cultural Programme Certification Board	
Member	Gujarat State Folklore Committee, Ahmedabad	
Member	Folklore Advisory Committee	
Member	Gujarat Sahitya Academy	

== Works ==
Gadhavi dedicated himself to gathering and publishing an extensive collection of folk tales, folk songs, and plays, which have been compiled into approximately 20 volumes. He authored Khamirvanta Manavi (1972), Chanda darshan (1991), Venudada (1978), Gandhikula (1969, about the ancestors of Mahatma Gandhi and some songs), Khamirvanti Kathao (1996), Bhavni Bhet (1998), Baharvatiyo Bhupat (1978), Mrutyuno Malkat (1996, short stories). Saurashtra: Satyam Shivam Sundaram (2000) was published by his son Laxman in his honour.

=== Poetry ===
- Pingal Kavya, 1952
- Sarhadno Sangram, 1962
- Gita Dohavali, 1969
- Arudh, 1973
- Chhanda Shatak

=== Folk literature ===
- Jivatar-na Jokh, 1964;
- Pragvad-na Pankhi, 1965;
- Yug Avtar,
- Jivan Zalak;
- Dhundhimal

=== Novel ===
- Nam Rahanta Thakkara, 1980

== Recognition ==
1. Sangeet Natak Akademi Award in 1990 for his contribution to the Gujarati folk music.
2. Gujarat State Gaurav Puraskar (1969)
3. Gaurav Purskar by Gujarat Sangeet Nritya Natya Akademi (1978)
4. Title of 'Charani Sahitya Vidvan' from Saurashtra University (1969)

== See also ==
- List of Gujarati-language writers
