= Kaviraj =

Honorific title for poets

Kaviraj (or Rajkavi, Kaviraja) is a title of honor, which was given to poets and litterateurs attached to royal courts in medieval India. Eminent Charans who were inducted into the royal courts due to their literary merit as royal poets and historians were given the rank of Kaviraja (King of Poets). Such Charans assumed positions of great influence in the medieval polity. Few well known people are Kaviraja Shyamaldas, Kaviraja Bankidas, etc. The descendants of such persons also started using the surname Kaviraj.

The surname is usually found in people of Gujarat, Rajasthan, etc. One of the community where this surname is often found is Charan, who were the state poets and historians in the Rajput kingdoms of these regions.

== Notable people ==
- Kaviraja Bankidas Ashiya
- Krishnadasa Kaviraja
- Kaviraj Shyamaldas
- Kaviraja Muraridan
- Kaviraj Rookny
- Kaviraj Sukon

== See also ==
- Barhath
- Gadhavi
- Rashtrakavi (disambiguation)
- Yug Charan
- Poet Laurette
- Kabiraj
