= Dula Bhaya Kag =

Indian poet, songwriter, artist (1903–1977)

- Kavi Kag
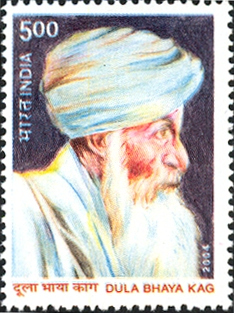
- Born: 25 November 1903; Sodvadari, Mahuva, Gujarat, India
- Died: 22 February 1977 (aged 73)
- Education: Till class 5th.
- Occupations: Farmer, writer
- Children: Rambhai Dulabhai Kag
- Writing career
- Pen name: Kag
- Language: Gujarati
- Subjects: Hinduism, Spiritualism, Gandhism
- Notable works: Kagvani (Bhag 1-8), GuruMahima, Chandrabavni, Vinoba-Baavni, Sorath-Baavni
- Notable awards: Padma Shri Award (1962)
- Literary movement: Education, Bhudan
- Website: www.kagsahitya.org

Dula Bhaya Kag (25 November 1903 – 22 February 1977) or Kag Bapu was an Indian poet, songwriter, writer, and artist born in 1903 in Sodvadari village, a village in the Saurashtra region, near Mahuva in the Indian state of Gujarat. He is mainly known for his work on spiritual poetry relating to Hinduism. He was facilitated with Padma Shri award in the year 1962.

== Early life ==
He was born in 1903 at Sodvadari, a village of his Maternal Parents. "He was very shy in his childhood" told by his relative. Kag received a 5th-grade education before leaving to tend his family's cattle and farm. Eventually, he became involved in the nationalist movement, and later after the formation of Saurashtra State, donated 650 bigha of his land to Vinoba Bhave's Bhoodan Movement.

== Career ==
Kag is known for publishing Kagvani, an eight-volume work consisting of devotional songs (episodes from the Ramayana and the Mahabharata), as well as songs based on Gandhian philosophy and the Bhoodan movement. He wrote eulogies for Mahatma Gandhi and Bhave. He also wrote many poems on Sonal Aai and Yogiji Maharaj the 4th spiritual successor of Bhagwan Swaminarayan in BAPS Swaminarayan Sanstha. He was also known as Bhagat Bapu and Kag Bapu.

As a result of his literary and political contributions to India, the country awarded him the Padma Shri award in 1962.

== Death and legacy ==
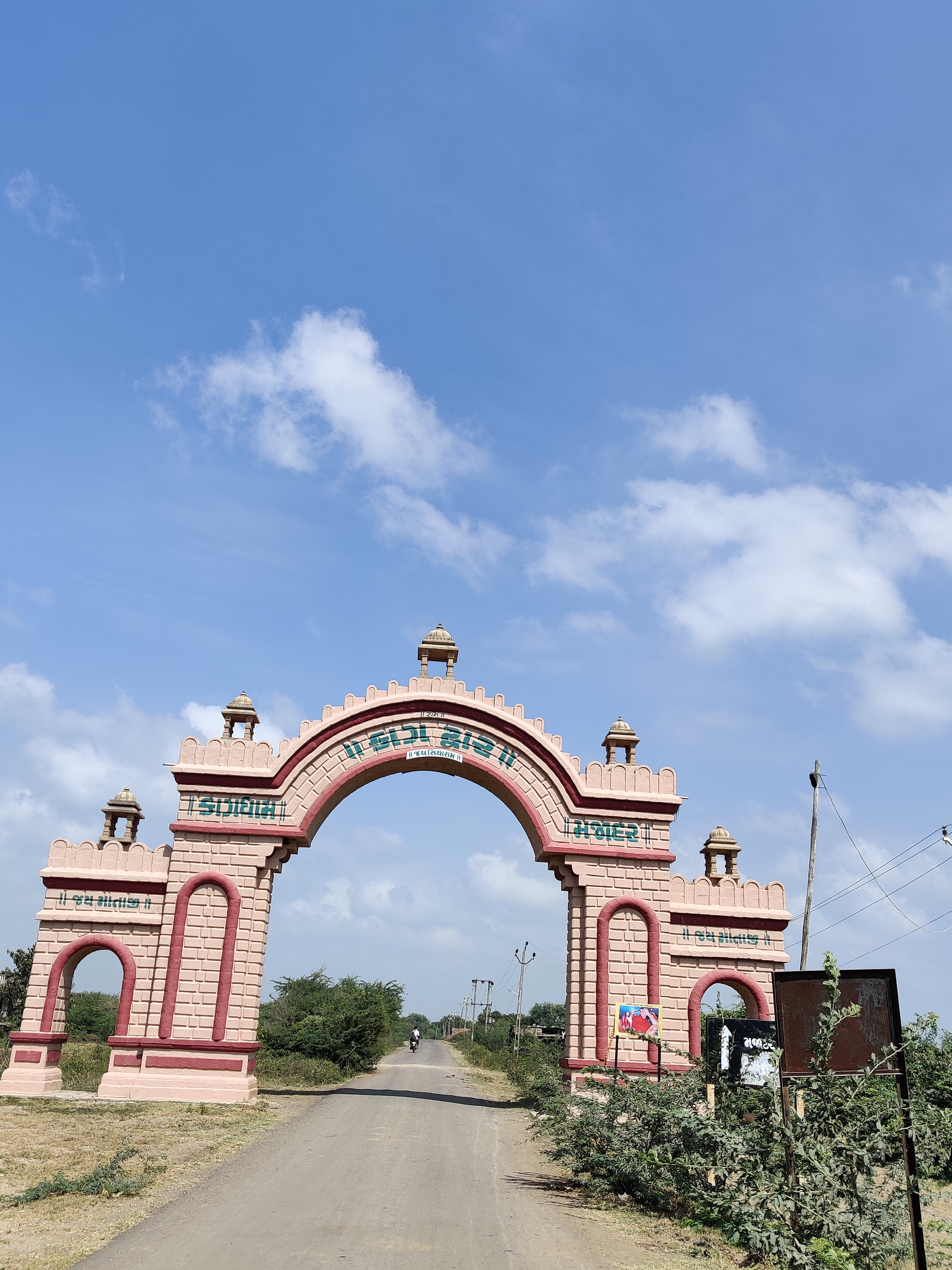
KagDwar, Kagdham

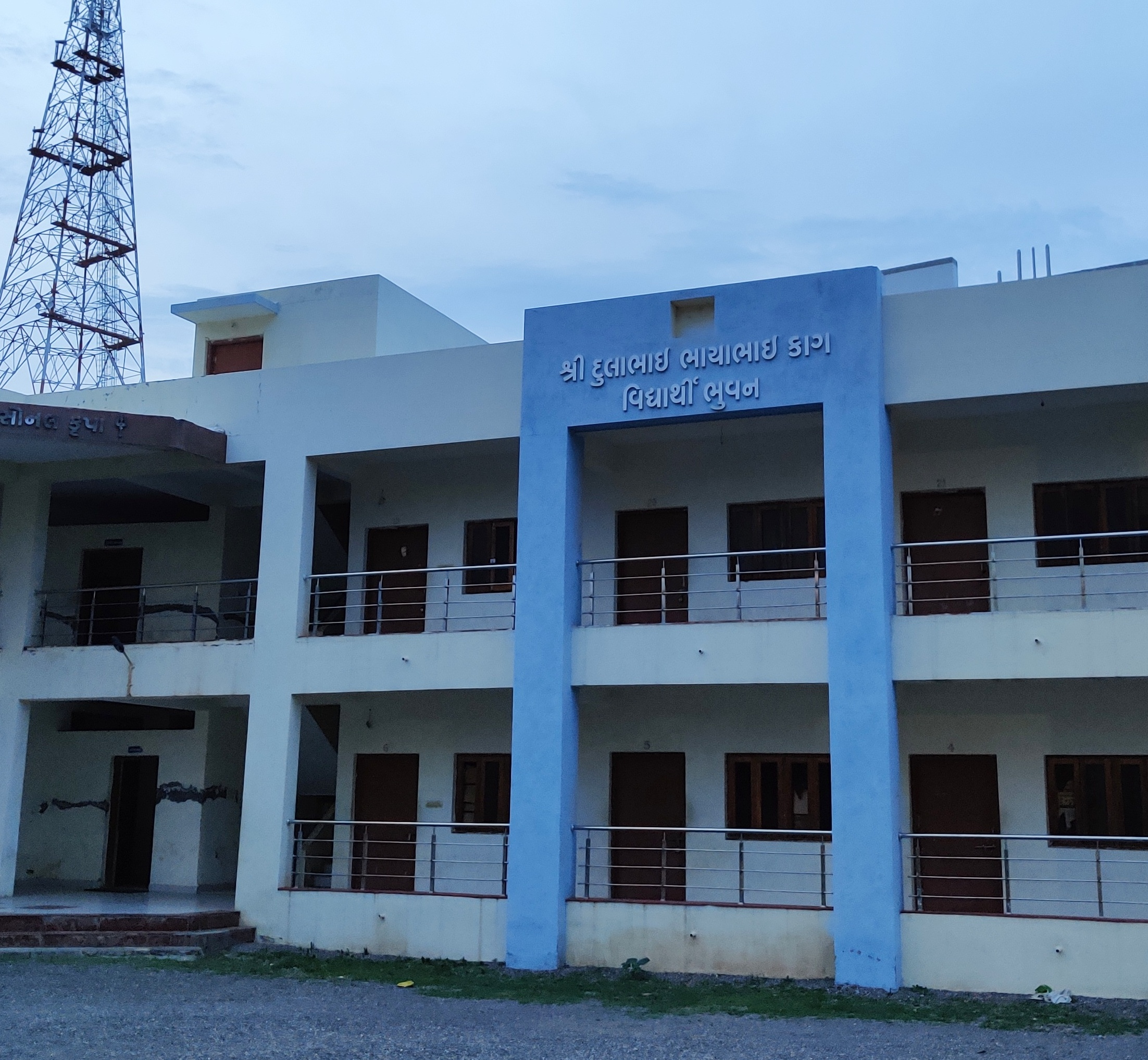
Boarding created in remembrance of Kavi Kag

Kag died on 22 February 1977, at the age of 74. Despite his limited education, his poems are used from primary education to master's programs. Union Home Ministry has changed the name of Majadar village in Gujarat as Kagdham in memory of poet Kag. On 25 November 2004, the Department of Posts released a commemorative stamp from Ahmedabad in denominations of ₹5 to mark his 102nd anniversary. Every year "Kavi Kag Award" is given to five eminent scholars in the field of literature.

== See also ==
- Kavi Kag Award
