= Kavi Daad =

Gujarati poet (1940–2021)

Dadudan Pratapdan Gadhvi, (11 September 1940 – 26 April 2021) also known as Kavi Dad, was a Gujarati poet and folk singer from Gujarat, India. He was awarded the Padma Shri in 2021.

== Biography ==
Gadhvi was born in 1940 at Ishwariya (Gir) (now in Veraval Taluka of Gujarat, India). His father's name was Pratapdan Gadhvi. He was the Rajkavi and Advisor to Navab of Junagadh. He was granted two tehsils Sapar and Ishwariya by Nawab of Junagadh. His mother's name was Karniba Gadhvi. He had studied till fourth grade. He was a native of Ishwaria village near Gir. He lived in Junagadh. He had written songs for 15 Gujarati films. His complete works are collected in Terva (2015) and Lachhanayan (2015). His other works are Terva (four volumes), Chittaharnu Geet, Shri Krishna Chhandavali and Ramnam Barakshari. His popular songs include a marriage song "Kalaja Kero Katko Maro Ganththi Chhuti Gayo", "Kailas Ke Niwasi", "Thakorji Nathi Thavu Ghadvaiya Mare" and "Hiran Halkali". He wrote book "Bengal Bavani" during Bangladesh Liberation war and donated all the earnings from the book to "Bangladesh Refugee Fund".

Keshubhai Patel former CM of Gujarat started a government scheme "Kunwarbai nu mameru" (a scheme that helps bride's parents financially for wedding) inspired by his poem "Kalja Kero Katko".

His poem,

Bapu Gandhi tamare barane betho, Aatlu aaj tu batav, Aa desh ma kedi have raam raj aave, Daad ke azadi fare ughadi, Ane sharme mukhda chupave, Jaja dhani ni dhaniyani ne prabhu tu lugda perave.

— Kavi Dad

was banned from reciting or reading as it questioned then situation in India during Emergency.

Swami Anand heard his poem "Ghadvaiya Mare thakorji nathi thavu" and thought of him being a Saint from medieval era, later on knowing he was poet from modern era. Kavi Dad was given name "Saint Poet Kavi Dad bapu".

He died on 26 April 2021. Prime Minister of India Narendra Modi mourned his demise.

== Recognition ==
Gadhvi had received the Gujarat Gaurav Award as well as the Jhaverchand Meghani Award. He was awarded the Padma Shri in 2021 for his contribution in literature and education. He was the recipient of Kavi Kag Award in 2004.

A Government Commerce and Arts college in Padadhari, Rajkot, Gujarat was given his name.

== See also ==
- List of Gujarati-language writers
