= Saurashtra University =

University in Gujarat, India

- Type: Public
- Established: 1967
- Affiliations: UGC
- Chancellor: Governor of Gujarat
- Vice-Chancellor: Dr. Nitin Pethani
- Location: Rajkot, Gujarat, India
- Campus: Urban
- Website: http://www.saurashtrauniversity.edu/

The Saurashtra University is one of the significant universities in Gujarat state in India. This university was established on 23 May 1967, in Rajkot city, and the administrative headquarters are at Rajkot. Presently, 272 colleges in Amreli, Jamnagar, Junagadh, Porbandar, Rajkot and Surendranagar districts are affiliated with the Saurashtra University.
