= Sitaram Lalas =

Rajasthani linguist and lexicographer (1912 – 1986)

- Born: 29 December 1908; Nairwa, Jodhpur State, British India (now in Rajasthan, India)
- Died: 29 December 1986 (aged 78); Jodhpur, Rajasthan, India
- Occupations: Linguist; Grammarian
- Awards: Padma Shri

Sitaram Lalas (29 December 1908 – 29 December 1986) (known as Sita Ramji maadsaab) was a linguist and lexicographer of India.

He produced the first dictionary of the Rajasthani language, titled Rajasthani Shabd (Sabada) Kosh and Rajasthani Hindi Brihad Kosha.

== Biography ==
Sitaram Lalas was a lexicographer and linguist of India. He was born on 29 December 1909 in a Charan family. He prepared Rajasthani dictionary during the period 1932–1978. This dictionary is divided into four sections. He also composed a large Rajasthani-Hindi dictionary. He was a native of Jodhpur. Encyclopedia of Britannica addressed Sitaram Lalas as the torchbearer of Rajasthani language. Sitaram Lalas devoted 40 years to compiling this masterful work and was awarded the Padma Shri in 1977 for his contribution. He was also awarded an honorary doctorate by Jai Narayan Vyas University (Jodhpur University). Apart from being remembered as a great teacher, Sitaram Lalas was also known for his excellent knowledge of Ayurveda. After completing formal schooling at the age of 16, Sitaramji Panna came to Jodhpur city on the advice of Ramji Maharaj and started living in Charan Hostel. The expenses of his education were borne by an elderly businessman of Sarwari village. Gulab Chand Chudamani, the hostel manager, was kind enough to get him admission in Rajmahal School, from where he passed his special eighth class with excellence and double promotion from Marwar Central Board. In 1928, he became a teacher at Chainpura School (Mandore, Jodhpur), continuing his studies. He received Sanskrit and grammar education from Pandit Bhagwati Lalji Shastri and visually impaired scholar Pandit Somendra. In 1930, he was appointed to the Vidyashala for school teacher training. After training, he was posted to Bagad School, Jodhpur in 1931. During this period, he came in contact with Shri Kesari Singh Barhath, a freedom fighter, and his brother Kishore Singh Brahaspatya, whom he supported with enthusiasm. Sitaram Lalas came in contact with Rajasthani poet Amritlalji Mathur. Through him he came in contact with Pandit Hari Narayanji Purohit, Library Superintendent of Jaipur State. With the inspiration of Hari Narayanji Purohit, he started work related to Rajasthani literature and history for Nagari Pracharini Sabha, Banaras. In 1931, he edited the book 'Virad Shrigar' which was an abridged version of the book 'Suraj Prakash'. The book is in poetic form and throws light on the victorious achievements of Maharaja Abhay Singh of Marwar in the war against Sarbuland Khan of Gujarat.

== Works ==
- Rajasthani Shabd (Sabada) Kosh
- Rajasthani Hindi Brihad Kosha
- Rajasthani Vyakaran Evam Sahitya Ka Itihas (History of Literature and Rajasthani Grammar)

== Creation of dictionary of modern Rajasthani language ==
Priest Hari Narayanji gave an old Rajasthani dictionary "Naam Mala" to Sitaram. After studying it, Sitaram said in his letter to Hari Narayanji on 4 April 1932 – "The dictionary is not useful in modern times." Purohitji took the comment seriously and reprimanded young Sitaram. In his letter, Purohitji asked Sitaram to first compile a dictionary and then criticize it. This harsh advice from the old man pierced Sitaram's heart and proved to be a turning point in the creation of the dictionary of modern Rajasthani language.

In 1962, the first part of the dictionary was published. The work was appreciated everywhere. Scholars have called it a revolutionary work. The editing work of poet Karnidan's 'Suraj Prakash', which was started long ago, was given practical shape and its three volumes were published in 1960, 61 and 63 respectively. This book contains the war achievements of Abhay Singh, the victorious Maharaja of Jodhpur against Sarbuland Khan of Ahmedabad. The book was published by Rajasthan Oriental Research Institute, Government of Rajasthan, Jodhpur. Apart from all the works, he edited the work 'Gajgun Rupak Bandh' written by Gadan Keshav Das, which was published by Rajasthan Oriental Research Institute in 1967. This book chronicles the war achievements of the victorious Maharaja Gajsingh rulers of Marwar in the war against the rebel Khurram.

After completing the work of a comprehensive dictionary, Sitaram Lalas started the work of Abridged Rajasthani Dictionary (Rajasthani-Hindi Sankalp Shabd Kosh), which was published by Rajasthan Oriental Research Institute, Jodhpur in two volumes in 1986 and 1987, which contained about two lakh words. He prepared a new Rajasthani grammar published by the Academy of Rajasthani Language, Literature and Culture, Bikaner in 2003.

== Awards ==
- In 1967, Rajasthan Sahitya Akademi Sangam Udaipur honored him with 'Sahityakar Samman' and nominated him a member of Saraswati Sabha.
- In 1973, he was honored with the title of 'Manishi' by Rajasthan Sahitya Akademi Sangam, Udaipur. This was the highest award given by the Academy.
- Awarded the honorary degree of Doctor of Literature Doctor of Letters by Jai Narayan Vyas University in 1976.
- In recognition of his contribution to Rajasthani language and literature, the President of India awarded him the Padma Shri, the fourth highest civilian award in the Republic of India, in 1977.
- In 1981, he was awarded the title of 'Rajasthan Ra Ratan' (Gem of Rajasthan) by the Rajasthani Bhasha Pracharini Sabha.
- In 1986, he was awarded the Highest Language Award by the Academy of Rajasthani Language, Literature and Culture, Bikaner.
- Sitaram Lalas died on 29 December 1986 at the age of 78. In July 1987, the Jodhpur Municipal Corporation named the road near his residence in Shastri Nagar as "Dr. Sitaram Lalas Marg".
- On the occasion of the centenary celebrations of Sitaram Lala in 2008, the Jodhpur administration installed a statue of Sitaram Lala at Gaurav Path, Jodhpur.
- On the occasion of Sitaram Lala memorial ceremony on 29 December 2009, the proposal to issue a commemorative postage stamp on Sitaram Lala was unanimously accepted under the chairmanship of the Minister of State for Panchayati Raj, Government of Rajasthan.
- Encyclopædia Britannica addressed Sitaram Lalas as the torch bearer of Rajasthani language.
