= Kirtidan Gadhvi =

Indian singer from Gujarat (born 1975)

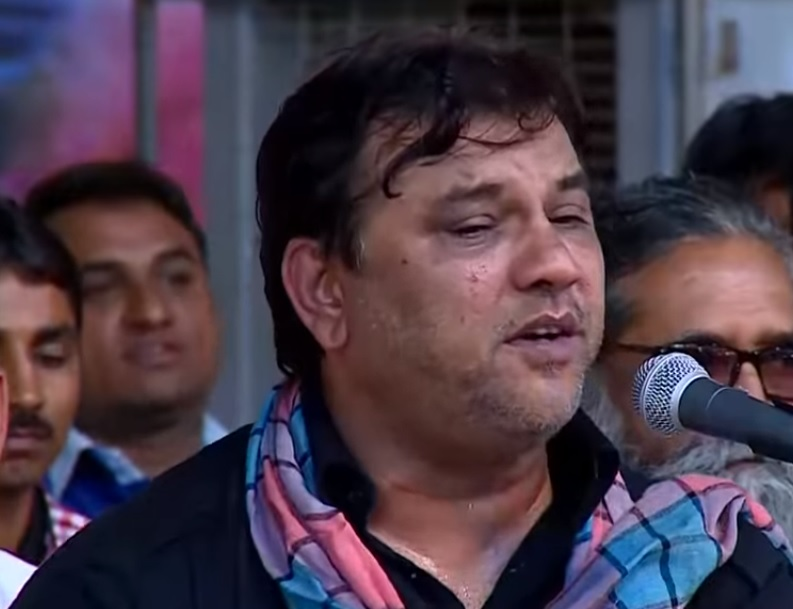

Background information
- Born: 23 February 1975 (age 51)
- Origin: Gujarat, india
- Occupations: Singer, lok gayak
- Instruments: Vocals, harmonium
- Years active: 12
- Website: www.kirtidan.com

Kirtidan Gadhvi is an Indian singer from Gujarat.

== Early life ==
Gadhvi was born and raised in Valvod, Anand district, known as Madhya Gujarat. Kirtidan received his BPA and a MPA in music from the Faculty of Performing Arts, M. S. University, Vadodara under B. I. Mahant and Rajesh Kelkar.

== Career ==
He debuted at a cow protection rally in Jamnagar, Gujarat, in 2005 that raised Rs 45 million. He sang the song "Laadki" on the TV show MTV Coke Studio along with Sachin–Jigar, Tanishka, and Rekha Bhardwaj in April 2015.

He is known for the dayras, folk songs and classical nuances.

He moved to Bhavnagar and became a music teacher at the Bhavnagar University. "Laadki", "Nagar Me Jogi Aaya" and "Gori Radha Ne Kaalo Kaan" are among his most popular songs. Currently he is living in Rajkot for his travelling convenience of his musical events throughout the area.

He was awarded "World Amazing Talent" Award in US and became the brand ambassador of World Talent Organization, USA.

He was the recipient of Kavi Kag Award-2019 presented by Murari Bapu.

== Events ==
Date	Event name	Type	Location
22 September 2025 to 1 October 2025	Norta Nagari	Garba Event	Ahmedabad
