= Rajasthani literature =

Literature written in the Rajasthani language

Rajasthani literature is a tradition in Indian literature dating to the 2nd millennium, which includes literature written in the Rajasthani language. An early form of Rajasthani started developing in the 11th century from Saurseni Prakrit as Maru-Gurjar or Gurjar Apabhramsa. Early Rajasthani literature was usually written by Charans. Earlier Rajasthani was known as Charani or Dingal, which was close to Gujarati. Medieval Rajasthani literature was mostly heroic poetry mentioning the great kings and fighters of Rajasthan. Rabindra Nath Tagore, a Bengali polymath, once said, "The heroic sentiment which is the essence of every song and couplet of a Rajasthani is peculiar emotion of its own of which, however, the whole country may be proud". It is generally agreed that modern Rajasthani literature began with the works of Suryamal Misran, including the Vansa Bhaskara and the Vir Satsai. The Vansa Bhaskara contains accounts of the Rajput princes who ruled in what was then Rajputana (at present the state of Rajasthan), during the lifetime of the poet (1872–1952). The Vir Satsai is a collection of hundreds of couplets.

== History ==
The first mention of Rajasthani literature was in Jain muni Udyotan Suri's (778 AD) novel Kuvalaya-mālā, where the language is referred to as "Marubhasha".

The roots of Rajasthani literature can be found in both the 11th and 12th centuries when Maru-Gurjari began to develop as a language.

== Rajasthani Literature Evolution ==
- Early Period (1050-1450 AD):
  - Foundational phase with the emergence of Maru-Gurjari as a language.
  - Development and initial shaping of Rajasthani literature.
- Medieval Period (1450-1850 AD)
  - Further maturation of Rajasthani language and literature.
  - Flourishing creativity and expression during this era.
- Modern Period (1850-)
  - Evolution into the modern era with contemporary influences.
  - Continuation and adaptation of Rajasthani literature to changing times.

== Classification ==
The entire Rajasthani literature can be divided into five main parts.

=== Charan literature ===
Charans have produced many outstanding poets, historians, warriors, loyal courtiers and scholars in various fields. Charan literature is available from the 8th-10th century. Numerous Dingal-Gita, duhas, composite works, historical writings, and many other verses and prose works are part of the Charan literature. There has been a continuous flow of their writings during the last six centuries. Among the historians, Suryamal Misran, Kaviraja Bankidas, Kaviraja Dayaldas and Kaviraja Shyamaldas were the stalwarts of this field. The writers of the Charan genre demonstrated their talent by writing in multiple rasa, including vira, sringara and bhakti at the same time. The heroic poetry of Charan literature inspired the warriors to fight till death for the honor of their land, religion, women and the oppressed.

Charan poets in their literature used Dingala (old Rajasthani), Sanskrit, Pingala (Brajbhasha influenced by Dingala), Apabhraṃśa, Rajasthani (Marwari, Mewari, etc.) and Gujarati along with languages like Urdu-Persian etc. Apart from the Charans, their dogmatic approach was followed by other contemporary poets, such as Bhats, Brahmin, Dhadhi, Sevag (Maga-Brahmin), Rajput, Motisar, Raval, Pancholi (Kayastha), Jains and others, and made important contributions in Charan literature. It is a very vibrant and powerful literature, and hence it played a very important role in shaping and molding the destiny of western-India and its heroes.

Classification of Charan literature
Subject wise (Jhaverchand Meghani) Source:			Text style Source:		
1	Stavana	eulogy of gods	1	khyat	Historical texts of Rajasthani literature covering the history of battles, sacrifices, valor and acts of bravery in Medieval India. Example - Muhanot Nainasi ri Khyat, Bankidas ri khyat, Dayaldas ri khyat, Mundiyar ri khyat etc.
2	Viradavalo	Praise of war heroes, saints and patrons	2	Vanshavali	In this category of works, the genealogies of dynasties are written with detailed description, like the genealogy of Rathores, genealogy of Rajputs etc.
3	Varanno	war description	3	Davavait	It is a Rajasthani artistic writing style consisting of Urdu-Persian vocabulary, expressed in the form of couplets praising someone.
4	Upalambho	Criticism/condemnation of those kings who misuse their power and their wrongdoings.	4	Varta or Vaat	Vata means narrative or story. There is immense literary literature on historical, mythological, romantic and imaginary stories in Rajasthan and Gujarat.
5	Thekari	condemnation of betrayel	5	Raso	Poetic texts in which along with details of war campaigns and heroic acts of the rulers, details of their dynasty are also found. Bisaldev Raso, Prithviraj Raso etc. are the main Raso texts.
6	Marsiya	A poem composed to express condolence after the death of warriors, protectors, friends or a king, in which the activities and activities and character qualities of that person are described.	6	Veli	Incidents of bravery, history, scholarship, generosity, love, devotion etc. are mentioned. 'Veli Kisan Rukmani Ri' written by Prithviraj Rathore is a famous Veli text.
7	Love Stories		7	Vigata	This is also the style of writing historical books. 'Marwar Ra Pargana Ri Vigat' is the main composition of this style.
8	Description of natural beauty, description of seasons, description of festivals		8	Prakash	The works that shed light on the achievements or events of a particular dynasty or individual are called 'Prakash'. Suraj Prakash, Pabu Prakash, Uday Prakash etc. are their main examples.
9	Description of weapon		9	Vachanika	It is a rhyming prose-verse composition, which gives rhyming rhymes. In Rajasthani literature, "Achaldas Khichi Ri Vachanika" and "Rathore Ratan Singh Mahesdasot Ri Vachanika" are prominent. Vachanika is mainly written in Apabhramsh mixed Rajasthani.
10	Praise of lion, horse, camel and cattle		10	Hakikat	
11	Instructive and practical proverbs related to "cleverness"		11	Khat	
12	Ancient epics		12	Patta	
13	Description of the suffering of the people at the time of famine and bad times		13	Parwana	

=== Jain literature ===
The literature written in large quantities by followers of Jain religion like Jain Acharyas, Munis, Yatis and Shravakas and litterateurs influenced by Jainism is called Jain literature. This literature is collected in large quantities in the libraries of various ancient temples. This literature is religious literature which is available in both prose and poetry.

=== Brahmin literature ===
Brahmin literature is available in relatively less quantity in Rajasthani literature. Major books like Kanhadde Prabandha, Hammirayan, Bisaldev Raso, Ranmal Chhand etc. are the books of this category.

=== Saint Literature ===
In the medieval period, in the stream of Bhakti movement, in the calm and mild climate of Rajasthan, many Nirguni and Saguni saints and mahatmas emerged on this land. The generous saints have written vast literature in the local language in devotion to God and for the welfare of the common people. Saint literature is mostly in verse.

=== Folk literature ===
In Rajasthani literature, there is also a vast amount of literature written in the popular folk style by the common people. This literature exists in the form of folk ballads, folk dramas, love stories, proverbs, riddles and folk songs.

== Major works ==
Brief introduction of major works

1. Prithviraj Raso (Chandbardai): It describes the life character and wars of the last Chauhan emperor of Ajmer – Prithviraj Chauhan. This is an epic of Veer Rasa written in Pingal. It is believed that Chand Bardai was the court poet and friend of Prithviraj Chauhan.

2. Khuman Raso (Dalpat Vijay): This book in Pingal language describes the rulers of Mewar from Bappa Rawal to Maharaja Raj Singh.

3. Virud Chhathari, Kirtar Bavanau (Poet Dursa Aadha): Virud Chhathari is the bravery saga of Maharana Pratap and in Kirtar Bavanau, the social and economic situation of that time has been described. Dursa Aadha was the court poet of Akbar. His bronze statue is present in the Achaleshwar temple of Achalgarh.

4. Bikaner Ra Rathoda Ri Khyat (Dayaldas Sindhayach): This two-part book describes the events from the beginning of the Rathores of Jodhpur and Bikaner till the coronation of Maharaja Sardar Singh of Bikaner.

5. Sagat Raso (Girdhar Asiya): This Dingal text describes Maharana Pratap's younger brother Shaktisingh. This is a poetic arrangement of 943 verses. Its name is also found in some books as Sagatsingh Raso.

6. Hammir Raso (Jodhraj): This poetic book contains a detailed description of the genealogy of Ranthambore ruler Rana Chauhan, his war with Alauddin Khilji and his bravery.

7. Vijay (Jayanak): This poetic text in Sanskrit language describes the lineage of Prithviraj Chauhan and his achievements. It contains authentic information about the development and environment of Ajmer.

8. Ajitodaya Mahakavyam (Jagjivan Bhatt): Contains a detailed description of Mughal relations. It is in Sanskrit language.

9. Dhola Maru Ra Duha (Poet Kallol): This book, full of the beauty of Dingal language, contains the love story of Dhola and Marvani.

10. Gajgunrupak (Keshavdas Gadan): It describes the state glory, pilgrimage and wars of Maharaja Gajraj Singh of Jodhpur. Gadan was the favorite poet of Jodhpur Maharaja Gajraj Singh.

11. Surajaprakasa (Karnidan Kaviya): It describes the events from the beginning of the Rathore dynasty of Jodhpur till the time of Maharaja Abhay Singh. There is also a description of the war between Abhay Singh and Gujarat's Subedar Sarbuland Khan and the victory of Abhay Singh.

12. Ekalinga Mahatmya (Kanha Vyas): It provides information about the genealogy of Guhil rulers and the political and social organization of Mewar.

13. Muta Nainsi Ri Khyat and Marwar Ra Pargana Ri Vigat (Muhnot Nainsi): This work of Nainsi, the Diwan of Jodhpur Maharaja Jaswant Singh I, contains the history of various states of Rajasthan as well as the history of the nearby princely states (Gujarat, Kathiawar, Baghelkhand, etc.). Nainsi has also been called 'Abul Fazal' of Rajputana. 'Marwar Ra Pargana Ri Vigat' can be called 'Gazetteer of Rajasthan'.

14. Padmavat (Malik Mohammad Jayasi): Composed around 1543 AD, this epic describes the desire of Alauddin Khilji and Mewar ruler Rawal Ratan Singh to obtain Queen Padmini.

15. Vijaypal Raso (Nall Singh Bhat): This heroic and romantic book in Pingal language describes the battle of Digvijay and Pang of Yaduvanshi king Vijaypal of Vijaygarh (Karauli). Nallasingh was a Bhat of Sirohiya branch and he was a dependent poet of Yayuvanshi king Vijaypal of Vijaygarh.

16. Nagar Samuchaya (Bhakt Nagaridas): This book is a collection of various compositions of King Sawantsingh (Nagridas) of Kishangarh. Sawantsingh had composed romantic compositions on the love story of Radha Krishna.

17. Hammir Mahakavya (Nayanchandra Suri): In this Sanskrit language text, Jain sage Nayanchandra Suri describes the Chauhan rulers of Ranthambore.

18. Veli Kisan Rukmani Ri (Prithviraj Rathore): Poet Prithviraj, one of Akbar's Navratnas, was the younger brother of Bikaner ruler Raisingh and used to write literature under the name 'Pithal'. In this book he has described the story of the marriage of Shri Krishna and Rukmini. Dursa Adha called this book the 'fifth Veda' and '19th Purana'.

19. Kanhadde Prabandha (Padmanabha): Padmanabha was the court poet of Jalore ruler Akhairaj. In this book, he describes the war between the brave ruler of Jalore, Kanhadade and Alauddin Khilji and the love affair of Firozha, daughter of Kanhadade's son Veermade Alauddin.

20. Rajrupak (Veerbhan): This Dingal book describes the war (1787 AD) between Jodhpur Maharaja Abhay Singh and Gujarat's Subedar Sarbuland Khan.

21. Bihari Satsai (Mahakavi Bihari): Poet Bihari, born in Madhya Pradesh, was the court poet of Jaipur King Mirza Raja Jai Singh. This famous book of his, written in Braj language, is an excellent work of Shringaar Rasa.

22. Bankidas Ri Khyat (Bankidas Asiya) (1838-90 AD): This Khyat, written by Bankidas, the poetry guru of Raja Mansingh of Jodhpur, is a source to know the history of Rajasthan. The collection of his books is published in the name of ‘Bankidas Granthawali’. His other books are Manjasomandal and Datar Bavani.

23. Kuvalmayala (Udyotan Suri): This Prakrit text was composed by Udyotan Suri while living in Jalore around 778 AD, which presents a good glimpse of the cultural life of the then Rajasthan.

24. Brajnidhi Granthawali: This is a compilation of poetic texts written by Maharaja Pratap Singh of Jaipur.

25. Hammid Hatha: Written by Chandrashekhar, a poet dependent on Bundi Shasan Rao Surjan.

26. Ancient Lipimala, History of Rajputana (Pt. Gaurishankar Hirachandra Ojha): Pt. Gaurishankar Hirachandra Ojha was the founder of Indian historical literature, who first made his name by writing the scripture of Indian script in Hindi. Got it written in the book. He has also written the history of the native states of Rajasthan. He was born in the princely state of Sirohi in 1863 AD.

27. Vachaniya Rathore Ratan Singh Mahe Sadasot Ri (Jagga Khidiya): In this Dingle book, Rathore Ratan Singh is fighting in the battle of Dharamat (Ujjain, Madhya Pradesh) between the Mughal army led by Jodhpur Maharaja Jaswant Singh and the combined army of Shah Jahan's rebellious sons Aurangzeb and Murad. There is a description of the brave war and sacrifice of.

28. Bisaldev Rasau (Narapati Nalh): It describes the love story of Chauhan ruler of Ajmer Bisaldev (Vigrahara IV) and his queen Rajmati.

29. Ranmal Chhand (Shridhar Vyas): These describe the war between Subedar Zafar Khan of Patan and Rathore king Ranmal of Idar (Samvarta 1454). Durga Saptashati is his other creation. Sridhar Vyas was a contemporary of Raja Ranmal.

30. Achaldas Kheechi Ri Vachanika (Shivdas Gadan): This Dingal book, written between 1430 and 1435, describes the war (1423 AD) between Sultan Houshangshah of Mandu and Achaldas Khedi, the ruler of Gagraun (1423 AD) and brief information about the Khedi rulers. Has been given.

31. Rao Jaitsi Row Chand (Beethu Sujaji): This book in Dingal language describes the war between Badhar's son Kamran and Bikaner King Rao Jaitsi.

32. Rukmani Haran, Nagadaman (Sayaji Jhula): These Dingal texts were composed by poet Sayaji, a protege of Eden Nerash Rao Kalyanmal.

33. Vansh Bhaskar (Suryamall Mixture) (1815-1868 AD) - The work of completing Vansh Bhaskar was done by his adopted son Muraridan. His other books are - Balwant Vilas, Veer Satsai and Chhand-Mayukh Ummed Singh Charitra, Buddha Singh Charitra.

34. Veervinod (Kaviraj Shyamaldas): Born in 1836 AD in Mewar (present day Bhilwara) and written in five volumes by Kaviraj Shyamaldas, a protege of Maharana Sajjan, Kaviraj was given the title of 'Saffron-e-Hind' by the British government on this book. Went. In this book, there is a detailed history of Menwar and also the history of other related princely states. Mewar Maharana Sajjan Singh had honored Shyamaldas with the title of 'Kaviraj' and in 1888 with the title of 'Mahamopadhyay'.

35. Aavni Ra Chungtya (Kesari Singh Barhat): Through these couplets, poet Kesari Singh Barhat had stopped the proud Maharaja Fateh Singh of Mewar from going to Delhi in 1903 AD. He was the state poet of Mewar.

36. Kesar-Vilas (Shivchandra Bhartia): The first play of modern Rajasthan (1900 AD). The first novel of modern Rajasthan, Kanak-Sundari (1903 AD), was also written by Shivchandra Bhartia. Vishrant Pravas (1904 AD), considered the first Rajasthani story, was written by him.

== Modern literature ==
- Abdul Vaheed `Kamal'
- Arjun Deo Charan
- Bavji Chatur Singhji
- Chandra Prakash Deval
- Dushyant
- Gajanan Verma (1926)
- Gordhan Singh Shekhawat (1943)
- Harish Bhadani
- Ishardas Barath
- Kanhaiya Lal Dugar
- Kanhaiyalal Sethia
- Karnidan Charan
- Kiran Nahta
- Kripa Ram Puniya
- Krishan Vrihaspati
- Lakshmi Kumari Chundawat
- Madan Saini
- madhav nagda
- Mahender Singh Shekhawat
- Major Ratan Jangid
- Malchand Tiwari
- Manohar shambhu Singh (1929)
- Manohar Sharma (1915)
- Manoj Kumar Swami
- Manuj Depawat
- Meharchand Dhamu
- Mohan Alok
- Muralidhar Vyas (1898–1983)
- Nand Bhardwaj
- Nanuram Sanskrita
- Narayan Singh Bhati
- Neeraj Daiya
- Om Purohit “Kagad”
- Pramod Kumar Sharma
- Prem Ji Prem
- Rameshwar Dayal Shrimali (1938)
- Ramniwas sharma (1931)
- Ramsawaroop Kisan
- Renwatdan Charan
- Sanwar Daiya(1948–1992)
- Satya Narayan Soni
- Shakidan Kaviya
- Shanti Bhardwaj “Rakesh”
- Sobhagya Singh Shekhawat (1924)

Girdhar Dan Ratnoo Dasori

- Sumer Singh Shekhawat (1935)
- Suryamal Misran
- Swami Narottamdas (1905–1981)
- Tej Singh Jodha
- Udairaj Ujval (1885–1967)
- Upendra 'Anu'
- Vijaydan Detha
- Sandeep Sharma
- Vinod Swami
- Yadvender Sharma “Chander”
- Zahoor Khan Mehar

Gajadan Charan Shaktisut 

- Tejas Mungeriya

== Medieval literature ==
=== Prominent figures ===
- Chand Bardai (1148–1191), author of Prithviraj Raso
- Shridhar Vyas (14th–15th century)
- Adho Duraso (1538–1651): Virud Chihattari, Doha Solanki Viramdevji ra, Jhulana Rav Surtan ra, Marsiya Rav Surtan ra, Jhulana Raja Mansingh Macchvaha ra, Jhulana Ravat Megha ra, Git Raji sri Rohitasji ra, Jhulana Rav Amarsingh Gajsinghota ra, Kirta Bhavani, Mataji ra Chhand, Sri Kumar Ajjaji na Bhuchar Mori ni Gajagat
- Muhnot Nainsi (1610–1670), Diwan of Raja Jaswant Singh of Jodhpur: Muhanot Nainasi ri khyata, Marawada ra Paraganan ri Vigata
- Dariyavji (1676–1758)
- Bankidas Asiya (1771–1833): Kaviraja Bankidas Ashiya was a Rajasthani poet, warrior and scholar.
- Kripa Ram Barath
- Narharidas Barahath, Avtar Charita
- Sūdan
- Swarupadas (1801–1863): Pandava Yashendu Chandrika, Rasa Ratnakar, Varnartha Manjari, Vritti Bodh, Hrinayananjan, Tarka Prabandha, Drishtanta Dipika, Sadharanopadesha, Sukshimopadesha, Aviek Paddhati, Pakhand Kandan, Chijjada Bodhpatrika
- Thakur Kesari Singh Barahath (Shahpura) (1871–1941): "Chetavani Ra Chungatya"

== See also ==
- Khyat
- Dhola Maru
- Prithviraj Raso
- Bhavai
- Braj literature
- Rajasthani people
- List of winners of Sahitya Akademi Awards for writing in Rajasthani language
- List of Rajasthani poets

== Bibliography ==
Primary Sources

- Padmanābha; Bhatnagar, V. S. (1991). Kanhadade Prabandha: India's greatest patriotic saga of medieval times : Padmanābha's epic account of Kānhaḍade. New Delhi: Voice of India.
