= Brohi =

Brohi may be:

- Sindhi spelling of Brahvi (disambiguation)
- Brohi Charan, a community in Pakistan

As a surname

- A. K. Brohi, Pakistani politician
- Haleem Brohi, Pakistani author and journalist
- Imran Brohi, Pakistani cricketer
- Khalida Brohi, Pakistani activist
