= Ratnu =

Charan clan

Ratnoo
- Ratnoo, Ratnu, Ratanu

Profile
- Country: India
- Thar Desert: Rajasthan, Gujarat
- District: Jaisalmer(Clan was originated in Jaisalmer and people of clan with time migrated to different regions/districts), Jodhpur, Bikaner, Nagaur, Sikar, Jaipur, Jhalawar, Idar, Kishangarh (Ajmer), Alwar, Kutch, Ahmedabad, Palanpur, Gandhidham, Bhuj
- Ancestry: Charan
- Ethnicity: Rajasthani, Gujarati
- Founder: Ratanji
- Ratnoo no longer has a chief, and is an armigerous clan
- Historic seat: Sirwa-Chincha-Sandha, Jaisalmer, Rajasthan
Clan branches
Chincha, Ayachi (Gujarat), Nala
Titles
Barhath Thakur Kaviraja

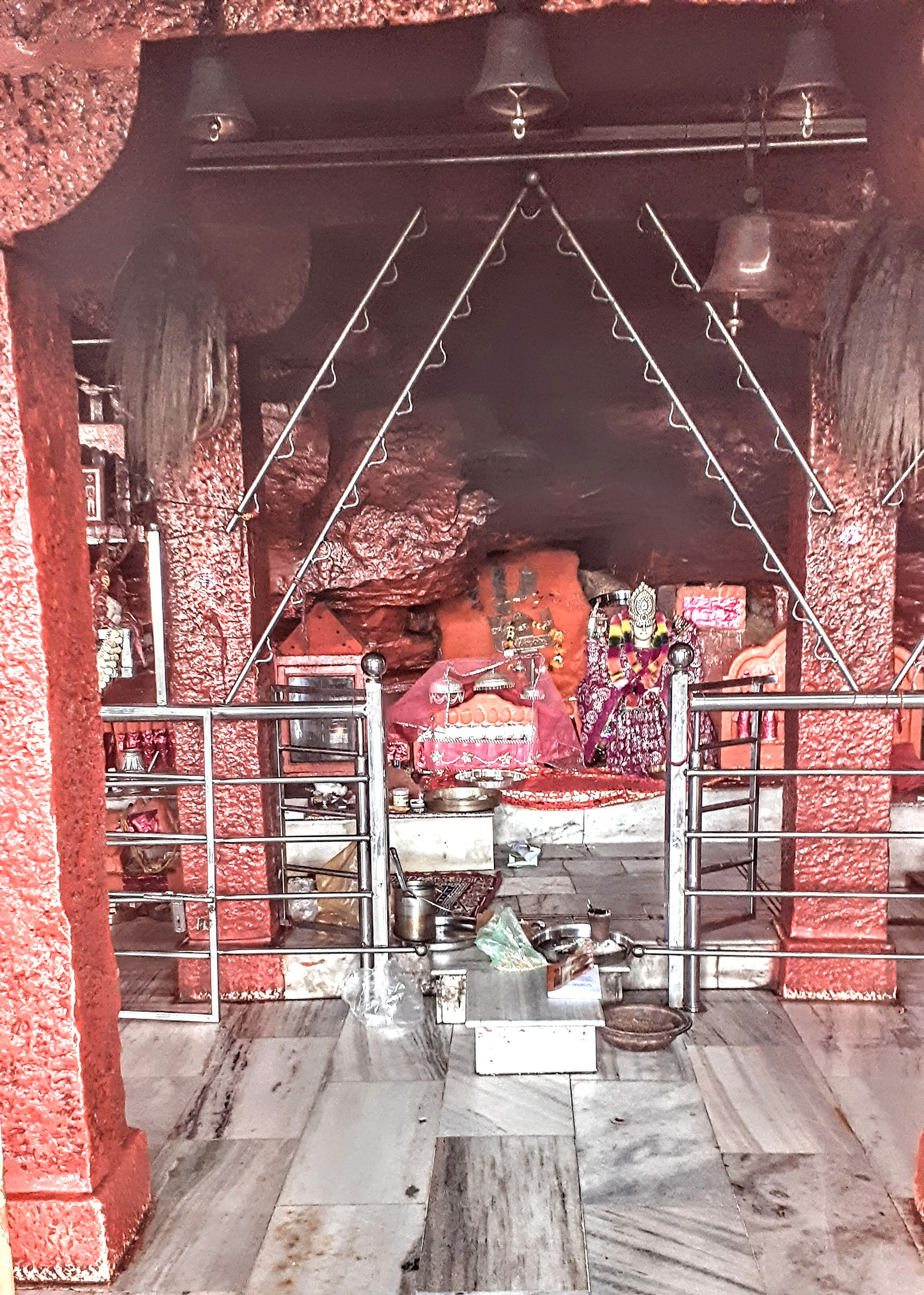
Shri Temdarai Temple (Incarnation of Shri Dugrachiyarai Mata Kuldevi of Ratnoo Clan), Jaisalmer, Rajasthan, India

Ratnu (IAST: Ratanūṃ; Devnagari: रतनूं), also spelt as Ratanu or Ratnoo, is a major clan of the Charanas in Rajasthan, India.

== Origin ==
The origin of the Ratnu Charanas is considered to be in the same time period as that of Sindhaych Charanas, around 8th to 9th century CE. They are the descendants of Ratanji Charan who once saved Rawal Devraj's life, a Bhati chieftain who later founded Derawar. After founding Derawar, Rawal Devraj called upon his childhood friend Ratanji and honored him with the position of Prolpat-Patvi of the Bhati dynasty. Subsequently, Ratnu Charanas held this position in the kingdoms of Jaisalmer and Pugal.

== History ==
Ratnus played an important role in the administration and polity of the region and held extensive sasan jagirs throughout Rajasthan. Many were influential poets, writers, and historians. The Ratnu family of Sikar formed one such bureaucratic lineage whose members were Diwans (Prime Minister) of the princely states of Sikar, Idar, Kishengarh, and Jhalawad.

== Notable people ==
- Thakur Akshay Singh Ratnu
- Dr. Omendra Singh Ratnu well-known author. He gained widespread recognition for his historical books, most notably Maharanas: A Thousand Year War for Dharma.
