= Brohi Charan =

Traditional priests of Hinglaj shrines

Brohi Charan (also called Brahui Charan; IAST: Brohi Cāraṇa; IPA: broːɦiː cɑːrəɳə; Sindhi: بروهي چارڻَ) are a Brahui, Sindhi speaking ethno-linguistic group residing in the Sindh and Balochistan provinces of Pakistan. Brohi Charans are the traditional priests of the Hinglaj shrines in Balochistan and Thatta.

== Origins ==
Historically, Charans lived around the Sindh-Balochistan region prior to the medieval age. From the 7-8th century onwards, the Charan population began eastern migration in waves towards the neighboring Rajasthan & Kutch regions.

Some of the Charan clans who lived in this region included Mishran, Tumbel, and Brohi. In time, the remaining Charan population of these clans converted to Islam. Over time, the remnant Charan community converted to Islam and this region of Hinglaj formed part of the Balochistan province of Pakistan after independence.

== Hinglaj tradition ==
The Brohi Charan community was historically associated with the worship and caretaking of the Hinglaj shrine. Charans are historically known as the primary worshippers of the goddess Hinglaj. Hinglaj is considered as a 'Mahashakti' born among the Charan community in present-day Nagar Thatta in Sindh.

Some scholars like Samaur give the origin of Hinglaj as belonging to the Gaurviya lineage of Charans of Sindh. Samaur believes that the origin of Goddess Hinglaj lies in the "gaur'viyā cāraṇ" branch from Thatta, a city in Southern Sindh. This connection to Thatta led to the belief among the sanyasis (ascetics) of the Charan community and the Udasi sect that the temple of Hinglaj in Thatta, Sindh is as important as the main shrine of Hinglaj in Las Bela, Balochistan.

Other scholars find the origin of Hinglaj in the Tumbel clan of the Charan community. Some base their account on the writings of P. P. Payaka, published in Cāraṇ-Baṃdhī magazine in 1955. Based on the article by P. P. Payaka, Westphal and Westphal-Hellbusch give the following account:

"Hala in Sindh was called Kohala in the former times, and the Goddess Hinglaj was once the queen of the Kohala or Kohana area. In this account, Hinglaj is portrayed as a Charani and the leader of the Tumbel Charan, whom she guided from Sindh to the Makran. P. P. Payaka also mentions that she remained a virgin all her life and was well versed in the religious texts." (Westphal and Westphal-Hellbusch 1974, 315).

== Worship ritual of Brohi Charans ==
In Balochistan, a certain local Muslim tribe primarily worships Hinglaj known as Brohi. The right to worship is exclusively assigned to kanyas(prebuscent girls) of Juman khamp(branch) of Bachol branch of Brohi tribe. These Brohi tribesmen are considered to be Muslim converts from Charans. They claim they are the 'Charan Musalmans'.

According to "Gorakh Nath Aur Unka Yug" by Ranghe Raghav, a Muslim community worshipped Hinglaj as 'Bibi Nani'.

The Brohi Charans who were historically in charge of the Hinglaj Mata temple at Balochistan were called "Malangs".

== Chamgali Maai or Chamgali Mata ==
Among Brohi Charans, Hinglaj is popularly referred to as 'Chole Wali Mai' or 'Nani'. The Muslim devotees call the pilgrimage of Hinglaj as 'Nani ka Hajj'. Both at the Hinglaj Temple at Lasbela, Balochistan, and the Hinglaj Temple at Thatta, Sindh, the ritual worship of Hinglaj was done by Brohi priests of Juman khamp.

The right of worshipping Hinglaj Devi is given to a Brahmacharini Kanya(a virgin girl) of Juman khamp of the Brohi tribe. This girl is called 'Changli Maai' and is considered an image of Hinglaj herself.

The chosen priestess Chamgali Maai is also sometimes referred to as Kottari.

The ritual of pilgrims entering and leaving the cave shrine of Hinglaj through its narrow ways inside the cave signifies re-birth. Upon emerging from the cave, pilgrims are considered to be "twice-born", without any sin. The pilgrims receive new clothes and consecrated food from the Chamgali Maai, the priestess from Baluchi Brohi-Charan lineage, as she is considered to be a full incarnation of Hinglaj.

As the current Chamgali Mai reaches adolescence, she selects the next prebuscent girl from her Brohi clan by placing her hand on the head of the chosen girl. And thus, a new Chamgali Mai receives the right to worship Hinglaj and be her representative.
