= Sasan (land grant) =

Tax-free land grant in medieval India

Sasan (Dingal for 'self-ruled'; IAST: Sāṃsaṇa) was a tax-free land grant given in the form of either partial or whole villages to the Charanas by rulers in medieval India. These grants were given in perpetuity and enjoyed superior rights compared to other land tenures.These land grants (often referred to as Sasan) were awarded for their diverse roles as poets, litterateurs, and warriors. Due to their status as landholders, Charan sirdars were formally recognized as Jagirdars and were entitled to use the title Thakur. In certain regions, such as Marwar, prominent Charan families held such significant status that they were effectively regarded as Darbars.

== History ==
The concept of Sasan refers to villages given to Charanas as a gift or reward by the state, exempt from revenue obligations. Charanas as a people commanded great respectability and influence in Rajputana, given high positions and honors in the royal courts and being considered a form of landed nobility. They were granted permanent tax-free land and enjoyed hereditary jagir, or sasan rights. These jagirs were granted to Charanas in recognition of their commendable services in administration, historiography, military, and literary merit. They were responsible for preserving socially authenticated memory and were supported accordingly. British accounts listed them among the "leading men of the [Rajput] State". They were held in high esteem and treated as sacrosanct and inviolable, being referred to as the Devīputra and classed together with "the cow and the Brahman".

The Charanas had a close relationship with the rulers and acted as mediators in political affairs. They were also responsible for writing the histories of royal and cadet lines, affirming the status of the Rajput ruler by celebrating his valor and rank among his clan and other Charanas. They were rewarded with gifts of wealth, cattle, and revenue-free land grants called sasan grants, among other ceremonial gifts. These grants were in the form of land free of obligations, and grant holders were entitled to collect land revenue and other cesses in their territories.

The British agent Archibald Adams, in his history of Rajputana states, noted that the Charanas were "a sacred race, holding large religious grants of land". In the kingdom of Marwar, c. 1880, the Charanas controlled over 350 tax-free estates, estimated to be worth over 400,000 rupees in total revenue assessment.

=== Features ===
Charanas received feudal holdings in recognition of their services to the kings or state. These holdings differed from the usual jagir tenures in several ways:

- Non-taxable:— Charanas did not have to pay any tax or rent on their jagir lands. All income from the Sasan territory remained with the Charanas. Sometimes, few Charana fief-holders did choose to pay a share of their income to the State, though they were under no such obligation.
- Jurisdiction:— There was no outside interference in the matters of administration and governance in the Sasan lands of Charanas. Within Sasan territories, the Raja (king) had no jurisdiction over inhabitants, and all the disputes were resolved under Charana jurisdiction. (Note: For centuries, it was an established principle that no Kshatriya could trespass or interfere in the lands of the Charanas, the "Sasana" estates.)
- Inalienable & Inheritable:— These lands were given to the Charana awardee and their descendants in perpetuity. However, in later periods, when the lineage of the original grantee ended, the fief was generally resumed by the state.

Furthermore, the grantee had the right to mortgage, gift, transfer and sometimes even sell their right of revenue from the estate to others. For example, Nainsi's Vigat records that Kisna, a Charana, sold a portion of his village to Kachara, a Brahman, which had previously been mortgaged to the same person. In later period, restrictions were placed on selling or gifting sasan lands, although mortgaging was still permitted.

=== Grant Records ===
The granting of these Sasan estates was recorded both orally as well as engraved on copper-plates known as tamrapatra, which could withstand the vagaries of time. These tamrapatras typically included the purpose of the grant as well as the names of the grantor and grantee. All the sanads and parwanās for these grants were maintained in the office of the diwan, and used the ancient phrase that the grant should continue "till the moon and sun endure".

== Composition ==
The term "Sasan" became a comprehensive term used to denote all land grants of a tax-free or religious nature, thus covering all grants made to charanas, sadhus, nath jogis, brahmins, bhats, yatis and temples. Terms such as dharmada, punyarth bhom, muafi, punya, and udik-inam, which signified religious nature of the grant, were synonym with Sasan.

Official documents from the royal courts provide details about the composition of various land grants enjoyed by jagirdars. For example, in 1614, the Kingdom of Bikaner had 175 villages as tax-free or Sasan estates. Of these, 111 villages were held by the Charanas while the rest 64 were given to Brahmins. In the Kingdom of Mewar, out of total 13.5 parts division of land, 7 parts belonged to jagirdars and bhomiya, 3 parts belonged to the Sasan, and 3.5 parts belonged to the state's Khalsa. Nainsi recorded the distribution of villages under the Sasan category in Marwar ra Paragana ri Vigat.

Sasan Villages of Marwar in 1891
(out of 621 sasan villages)
Mardumshumari Rajmarwar
1. Muslim (1.00%)
2. Nakarchi (0.00%)
3. Nath (3.00%)
4. Temple (2.00%)
5. Unknown (6.00%)
6. Ascetics (incl. sadhus and Gosains) (2.00%)
7. Bhat (2.00%)
8. Bhopa (1.00%)
9. Brahmin (all sects) (30.0%)
10. Charana (53.0%)

Composition of Sasan villages in Marwar during 17th century Marwar ra Paragana ri Vigat
S. No.	Pargana (Administrative Units)	Charanas	Brahmans	Bhat	Miscellaneous
1.	Jodhpur	75	62	01	08
2.	Sojat	17	15	-	-
3.	Jaitaran	8.5	08.5	-	01
4.	Phalodi	01	04	-	04
5.	Merta	27	15.2	01	04
6.	Siwana	13	17	-	-
7.	Pokaran	11	04	-	-
8.	Sachore	09	-	-	02
9.	Jalore	12	01	02	07
	Total	173.5	127	04	26
	Percentage of total Sasan villages	52.3 %	38.4 %	1.2 %	7.9 %

== Comparison ==
Comparing Sasan grants with the contemporary Mughal madad-i ma'ash grants, the following observations can be made:—

- Both types of grants aimed to serve the same purpose of religious charity. While the madad-i ma'ash grants were mainly given to town residents, the sāsan-grantees seem to have been rural residents.
- Both grants had a proportion of total income to total revenue that was about equal. The revenue of madad-i ma'ash grants did not rise above 5.84% of the total jama' in Akbar's time, while the revenue of Sasan grants in Marwar did not exceed 5.09% of the total except in Sojat.
- Sasan grants suggest a possibility of a class with certain zamindari rights emerging, while madad-i ma'ash lands do not indicate a strong tendency of this nature, except in Aurangzeb's time when such grants were made hereditary in 1690.

== Adalat Khat Darshan ==
The concept of Khat Darshan refers to six communities with socio-religious character, including Charana, Brahmin, Mahant, Nath, Yati, and Jogi (ascetics). In Mewar, jagirdars who were beneficiaries of the Sasan grants were known as Khat Darshan.

The Charanas used to rely on the practice of Chandi or Traga (ritual self-mutilation leading to suicide) for securing justice and fulfillment of their demands. However, changes in the socio-legal system brought by the British Raj compelled them to turn to cultivation. This led to illegal grabbing of land among siblings, with disputes invariably involving litigation with their partners due to their custom of inheritance, which required equal division of property (charania-bant). This marked a shift towards the acceptance of colonial laws as they had previously considered themselves above the law. Land disputes among the Charanas were so numerous that a separate court, the 'Adalat Khat Darshan', was established for their settlement. This 'Adalat Khat Darshan' court was established in 1839 in Jodhpur (Marwar), with elite Charanas in-charge, to settle disputes involving Charanas, Brahmans, and Purohits. Through this court, they sought to redress disputes over land use, water infrastructure, and other agro-social grievances.

== See also ==
- Jagir
- Dhandhaniya Sasan
- Brahmadeya

== Bibliography ==
- Bhadani, B. L. (1999). Peasants, Artisans and Entrepreneurs – Economy of Marwar in the Seventeenth Century. Rawat Publications. ISBN 9788170335047.
- Cannon, Brian T. (2023-03-28). "An Enduring Prestige: Land Grants in a Princely State Census". Journal of the Economic and Social History of the Orient. 66 (3–4): 422–461. doi:10.1163/15685209-12341599. ISSN 1568-5209.
