= Panchetiya =

- village
- Location in Rajasthan, India Panchetiya (India)
- Coordinates: 25°32′23.57″N 73°31′53.17″E
- Country: India
- State: Rajasthan
- District: Pali

Population (2001)
  - Total: 1,889

Languages
  - Official: Hindi
- Time zone: UTC+5:30 (IST)
- Telephone code: 02935
- ISO 3166 code: RJ-IN
- Vehicle registration: RJ-22
- Sex ratio: 0.940 ♂/♀

Panchetiya is a village located in Marwar Junction Tehsil of Pali district in Rajasthan state of India.

Rashtra Kavi Dursa Ji Arha (1538–1651), a famous Rajasthani scholar, warrior and administrator of the medieval era, was the ruler and he stayed in the Panchetiya village in his last days with his son Kishan Ji Arha. After him, the Arha Charans remained the heriditery Thakurs of this village.

== History ==
Panchetiya was one of the jagir villages under fiefdom of Dursa Ji Arha. Kaviraja Dursa Ji had married twice. From both wives he received four sons- Bharmal Ji, Jagmal Ji, Sadul Ji and Kisna Ji. When Dursa Ji was old, his eldest son disputed with him about the property, upon which Dursa Ji gave him a choice, he said - 'I am on one side and my property on the other, what will you choose?'. The eldest son Bharmal, who was born to his first wife, took possession of most of his feudal property in Marwar, while Kisna Ji (son from the younger wife) accepted the remaining property and lived with his father. So, Dursa Ji spent his old days peacefully in the village Panchetia (granted by Mewar Maharana) and died in 1855 AD.

== Demographics ==
Population of Panchetiya is 1,889 according to census 2001, where male population is 917, while female population is 972.
