= Dharanawas =

Village in Rajasthan, India

Dharanawas is a Jagir village of Varansurya-Charans in Nagaur district of Rajasthan, India. As of 2011, the population was 1,698, made up of 322 families.
