= Audichya Brahmin =

Brahmin community of Gujarat

Audichya Brahmins are a Hindu Brahmin sub-caste primarily of Kanyakubja Brahmin origin mainly from the Indian state of Gujarat. They are the most numerous Brahmin community in Gujarat. A minority of them reside in the Indian state of Rajasthan.

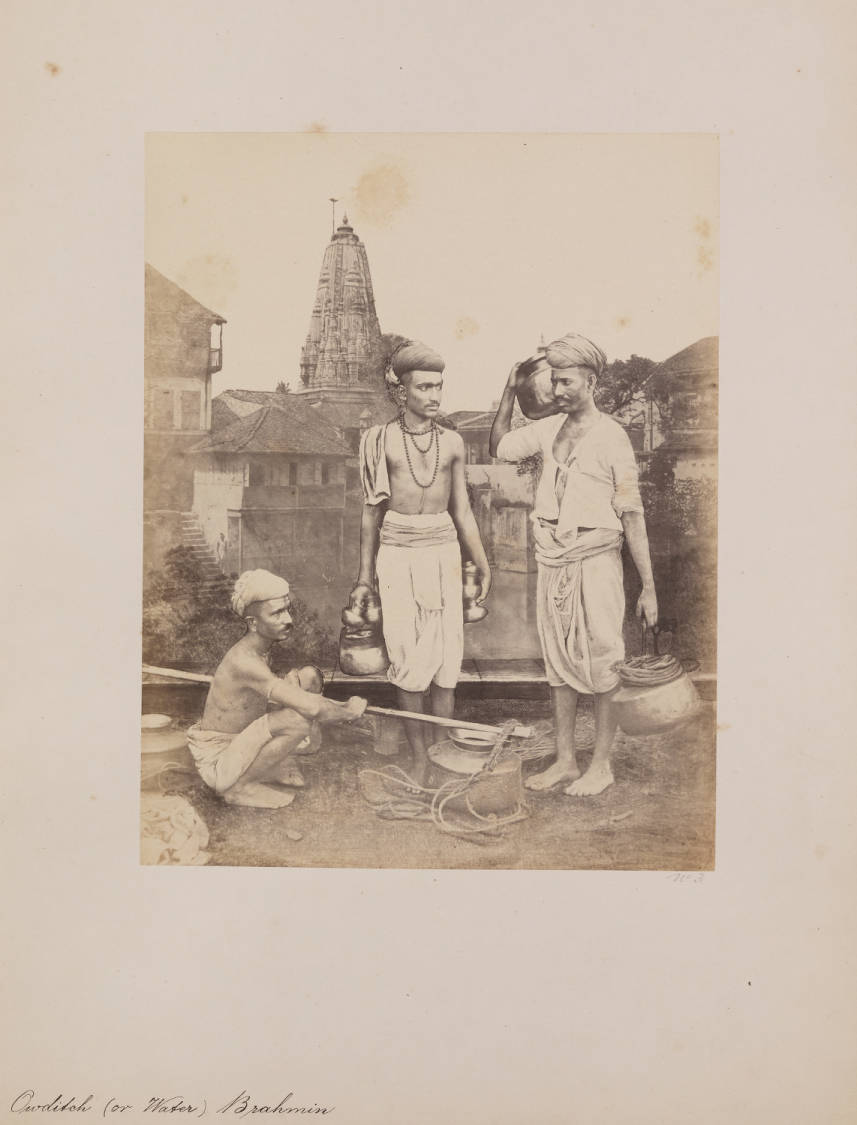
1860s photograph of Owditch Brahmins in Gujarat

According to tradition, the Audichya Brahmins descend from over a thousand North Indian Brahmin families who were invited by Solanki kings in the 10th century to Gujarat to serve as priests of the Rudra Mahālaya Temple. The king Mularaja who conquered Gujarat and Saurashtra, had invited the Northern Brahmins. These Brahmanas were called as Audichyas. Audichyas are primarily Kanyakubja Brahmins. Georg Bühler also refers to Mülaraja of Kanyakubja, who conquered Gujarat, Mülaraja and his successors settled in Gujarat numerous colonies of Brahmins, who down to the present day, are called Audichya.

== Classification ==
The caste is divided into two endogamous groups, the Sahasra and the Tolakia. In a census in 1883, the sahasra were numerically a much bigger community than the Tolakia. The sahasra are further subdivided into the Zalawadi, Sihora and Sidhpora groups. The community is at times also differentiated by their geographical location they came from, for example, Marwadi audichya, Kutch audichya or Wagadia audichya. Other differentiation is by the caste that retains them as purohit (family priest) for rituals, for example Darji-gor, Mochi-gor, Kanbi-gor, Koli-gor, Charan- gor, Raj-gor in Saurashtra and northern Gujarat. The Parajia sub-group of Audichya Brahmins worked as hereditory purohitas of Charanas around Junagarh.

== Society and culture ==
In the past, since the Sidhpora sub-caste was considered higher in social ranking, other audichya groups considered it a point of honor to offer their daughters in marriage to Sidhpora men. In the past this custom led to polygamy amongst the Sidhpora group. During the British colonial rule, the caste was one of the first Gujarati community to take up western education. The community along with the Bhatia also were the first to form a caste association. The caste association's aim was mutual help and support for members in the cities and to promote education.

In the 19th century, most Audichya Brahmins were priests who lived on alms.

The Audichya Brahmins founded first caste reform organisations in Ahmedabad. In Ahmedabad in 1873, those Sahasra Audichya Brahmins who had received western education founded the Audichya Hitechu Sabha. The Sabha tried to get rid of several caste customs including dowry, child marriage, polygamy, obscene songs at weddings, and heavy expenses at marriage and death. They also supported women's and children's education. These attempts were generally successful and the Sabha spread to other Gujarati cities and Bombay. In 1876, the Tolakiya Audichyas founded the Audichya Tolakiya Subhecchak Sabha with similar goals.

== Notable people ==
- Dayananda Saraswati (1824–1883), Indian philosopher, socio-religious reformer and founder of the Arya Samaj
- Dhirubhai Thaker (27 June 1918 – 22 January 2014), Gujarati writer and creator of the Gujarati Vishwakosh
