= Narayan Singh Bhati =

Narayan Singh Bhati (1930 – 18 April 1994) was a writer in Rajasthani language.

== Works ==
He was the founder and director of Rajasthani Research Institute based at Chopasani Jodhpur since 1955 until 1993. He was deeply involved in preservation of old Rajasthani literature.

== Awards ==
He was awarded by Sahitya Akademi, Delhi for his poetry Barsan Ra Degoda Dungar Langhiyan in 1981. He was also awarded by the Rajasthan Sahitya Akademi's Prithviraj Prize. He received the Padma Shri in the year 2010.
