= Thakur Akshay Singh Ratnu =

Indian writer

Sahityabhushana Thakur Akshay Singh Ratnu
- Born: 24 December 1910; Jaipur State
- Died: 1 July 1995 (aged 84); Jaipur
- Occupations: Poet; Writer
- Relatives: Thakur Jhujhar Singh Ratnu(father)
- Writing career
- Language: Dingal; Rajasthani; Brajbhasha; Hindi
- Notable works: Akshaya Kesari, Pratap Charitra Akshay Bharat Darshan Akshay Jan Smriti

Thakur Akshay Singh Ratnu (24 December 1910 – 1 July 1995) was a Rajasthani, Brajbhasha and Hindi poet from Rajasthan. His penned poems criticising the British policies of divide & rule. He is considered as one of the modern traditionalist poets. He was a scholar of Hindi, Rajasthani, Dingal(Old Rajasthani), Urdu, Sanskrit and Prakrit. He has been awarded with epithets of 'Sahitya Bhushan', 'Sahitya Ratna', and 'Kavi Ratna'.

== Early life and family ==
Thakur Akshay Singh Ratnu was born on 24 December 1910 in a Charan family of Kali Pahari-Hanphawat village in Jaipur. His father was Thakur Jhujhar Singh Ratnu of Charanwas village in Nagaur, Rajasthan. His grandfather Thakur Jawahar Dan was well to do and affluent, his Hundi (credit instrument) used to operate from Kuchaman. His mother died while he was young. Akshay Singh was subsequently sent to Alwar where he was raised by his aunt. Thakur Akshay Singh has four sons and one daughter.

== Education ==
Thakur Akshay Singh completed his education in Alwar under his guru Girdharilal Bhatt Tailang. He learned Kaumudi, Raghuvansh, Kuvalyananda, Chandralak, and Amarkosh. He became a scholar of Hindi, Dingal, Sanskrit, Urdu, Rajasthani, Brajbhasha, and Prakrit.

== Career ==
Akshay Singh began his career as a civil servant in the erstwhile princely state of Alwar. He was on good terms with the ruler Sawai Jaisingh. After Independence, Akshay Singh moved to Jaipur and served as Chief Reader in the Matsya Sangh, Sanyukt Rajasthan, and Jaipur Secretariat, finally retiring in 1968.

Alwar State was one of the first to declare Hindi as the official state language. Akshay Singh served as the Principal of the Hindi Training Center established to promote & teach Hindi.

== Poet ==
Thakur Akshay Singh began composing poems at an early age. At the age of 6, he presented a poem to the Maharaja of Bikaner, Ganga Singh congratulating him on his Gang Nahar project to bring the river waters to the farmers in Ganganagar.

In 1939, Akshay Singh criticized the role of British Government for their divide & rule policy when they incited the Meo community of Alwar & surrounding regions which led to riots and the Maharaja of Alwar was banished to Abu & later to Bombay by the British Government. Akshay Singh penned a poem ‘Alwar me Ulatfer’ outlining the role of British. Akshay Singh also travelled to meet Maharaja Jai Singh who called on him during his banishment. He stayed with the ruler for 15 days at his request.

Akshay Singh criticized the move of removing Charans from the Walterkrit Charan Rajput Hitkarini Sabha.

He was given epithet of ‘Braj-Ratan’ by the Brajbhasha Akademi. The academy published a monograph on Thakur Akshay Singh Ratnu for his contribution in Brajbhasha literature.

Akshay Singh has also written on the themes of sacrifice of Jauhars of Chittor as well as Gandhian philoshphy.

== Social service ==
Akshay Singh led the efforts for the renovation of Karni Mata Temple in Mathura, originally built in the 16th century by Lakhaji Barhath. In Alwar, Thakur Akshay Singh constructed a Charan Boarding House(Chatravas) as well as Gujki Bhavan and Thabhawali Bhavan. In 1949, Akshay Singh moved to Jaipur and made efforts for the construction of a Charan Boarding House. He collected donations for the cause and was aided by Gulabdanji Hampavat(Kot) and Shishdanji Palawat(Kishanpura). The boarding was inaugurated by the Revenue Secretary Hetudan Ujjwal.

=== Quote ===
“अपनी भाषा अपना वेश, अपनी संस्कृति अपना देश, स्वतंत्रता का यह ही सार, सादा जीवन उच्च विचार।”

"Our language our dress, our culture our country, this is the essence of freedom, simple life and dignified thoughts."

== Works ==
Sources:

1. Akshaya kesarī, pratāpa caritra By Akshayasiṃha Ratnū · 1989
2. Akshay Bharat Darshan
3. Akshay Jan Smriti
4. Walterkrit Charan Rajput Sabha ke naye rulings par do shabd
5. Brajbhasha verse translation of the tenth skanda of Shrimad Bhagavad
6. Alwar Mein Ulatfer (Khand Poetry)
7. Akshay Tej Niti Samuchhay
8. Dasori Darshan
9. Rajasthan Vandana
10. Bhisam Grisam
11. Doha chhand aur uske vibbhin bhed
12. Anyokti Gulab Ikkisi
13. Farishte varo hazaro
14. Basant Varnan
15. Kashmir Vijay
16. Chittor ke teen Shake
17. Pat Parivartan
18. Jaipur ri Jhamal
