= Khyat =

Collection of events or continuous history

Khyat (IAST: Khyāta) is a form of bardic historical prose that was prevalent in the western Indian states of Rajasthan and Gujarat. It is a collection of events or continuous history. Khyats generally contained histories of a ruling dynasty or a person. In the former states that now constitute Rajasthan, Khyatas were written by the Charans under the patronage of rulers who wished to perpetuate their exploits. These accounts contained histories of battles, sacrifices, valour, and chivalry, values that came to be associated with Rajputs. Khyatas are often known by the name of their authors; e.g., Bankidās-ri-Khyāt (Khyat by Kaviraja Bankidas). Nainsi-ri-Khyat written by Nainsi is considered to be the most prominent of khyats.

== Types of khyats ==
Khyatas can be categorised into 2 types:

1. Khyatas which contains a contiguous or continuous history, such as the Dayāldās ri Khyāt.
2. Khyatas which contains a collection of different 'vatas', like the Nainsi ri Khyat.

Khyat and vat/bat were recited in Charan-Rajput gatherings and were meant to convey the magnificence of both the Rajputs and the composers that were the Charans. Khyatas were primarily oral accounts that were textualised by the seventeenth century.

== List of khyats ==
- Nainsi-ri-Khyat
- Bankidas-ri-Khyat
- Dayāldās-ri-Khyāt
