= Dursa Arha =

16th-century warrior and Rajasthani poet

Rashtrakavi Dursa Arha
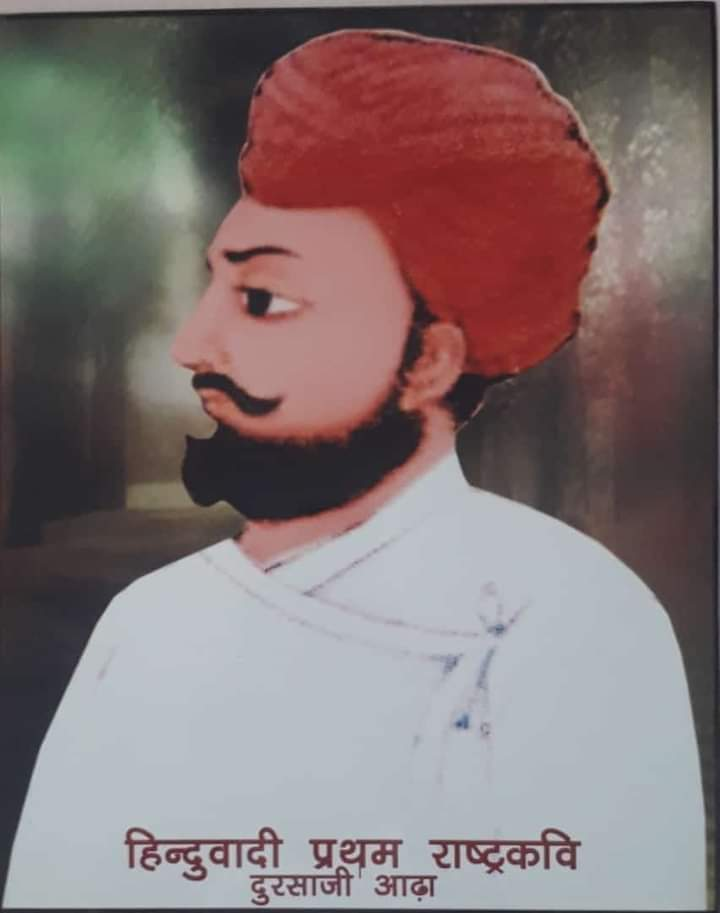
- Born: c. 1535; Pali
- Died: 1655; Panchetiya
- Occupation: Poet Warrior Advisor
- Notable work: Virud Chihattari; Mirta Bhavani
- Children: 4
- Father: Mehaji Arha

Dursa Arha (c. 1535–1655 AD) was a 16th-century warrior and Rajasthani (Dingal) poet from India. He earned the epithet of the 'First Nationalist Poet Of India' or Rashtrakavi because of his nationalist stance in his bold Dingal poems commending Maharana Pratap of Mewar in his struggle against the Mughal Empire. He is one of the most highly regarded poets of the time, who was also a valuable and respectable part of the Mughal court. He was a renowned litterateur, historian, war general, consultant, administrator, feudal lord, and magistrate. He had close relations with the rulers of many erstwhile kingdoms. On the basis of wealth, fame, and honor Dursa Arha acquired in his lifetime and his contribution to medieval Indian history and literature, the historians and litterateurs consider him as one of the greatest poets. Dursa Arha attained heights of opulence and grandeur reached by no other poet in history.

Delhi Sahitya Akademi includes him in the list of 'The Makers of Indian Literature' along with the Indian literary stalwarts of all time.

He wrote poems in praise of Maharana Pratap, and when news of Pratap's passing reached the Mughal court, fearlessly recited a verse eulogizing Pratap in Akbar's presence.

Some 4 generations past Dursa Arha, the native village of the Sisodia rulers called Sisauda (Sisoda) was granted to the descendants of Dursa Arha, who reside there till date.

== Early life ==
Dursa Arha was born in 1535 AD (V.S. 1592 Magha Sudi Chavdas) in Dhundla village near Sojat Pargana (Pali) of Marwar state. His father Mehaji Arha was a great devotee of Hinglaj Mata and made pilgrimages to Hinglaj Shaktipeeth in Balochistan thrice. His ancestors came from the village of Asadha, located in the Jalore district near Sanchore, and from this connection came Dursa's last name. Dursa Arha, paternally, was born in the lineage of Gautam, while his mother Dhani Bai (of Bogsa lineage of Charans) was the sister of the Govind Bogsa. When Dursa was six years old, his devout father Mehaji Arha went on pilgrimage to Hinglaj again and this time he took sanyasa. Therefore, in order to run a house in the absence of the father, he had to work as a child laborer on a farmer's farm.

== Hardships ==
In the village of Dhundla of Marwar state, a boy working on a farm was irrigating in a pediatric crop, but due to the breaking of the raw drain of sand being used for irrigation from that boy, the water on both sides started draining. The angry farmer, crossing all the limits of cruelty, forced the young boy into the broken drain and put soil on him, to stop the spread of water to irrigate his crop.

At the time, the feudal Thakur Pratap Singh of an estate named Bagdi, had come to the well located in the farmer's farm to feed his horses, when his eyes fell on the boy buried in the soil of the field, he was shocked. After finding out that the boy was a Charan, he took the boy along with him to Sojat and arranged for his proper education and initiation. Over the years, the child became an able administrator, warrior, and a brilliant poet and scholar. The same child became renowned as Maha Kavi Dursaji Arha.

== Career ==
After Dursa Ji finished his education and training, he had not only become a great poet, his sword was also as brave as his pen. In view of his intelligence, Thakur Pratap Singh of Bagdi, appointed him his Principal Advisor and Military General. Dursa Ji was awarded the fiefdom of two villages named Dhundla and Nathalkudi as an award.

== Dursa Arha and the Sirohi Kingdom ==
In 1583 AD, Mughal Emperor Akbar sent an army in favor of Jagmal Sisodia (Mewar) against Rao Surtan Singh Deora of Sirohi state, the Marwar state army also marched against Surtan Singh in favor of Jagmal. In that army from Marwar, Bagdi Thakur Pratap Singh and Dursa Arha also took part in the war. The two armies fought at a place called Datani near Abu, in which Pratap Singh died and Dursa Arha was severely wounded. In the evening, Maharao Surtan Singh was taking care of his wounded soldiers, including his feudal lords, when he found Dursa Arha and was about to give him the milk of poppy (to end his life in a painless way). The injured Dursa, managed to introduce himself, said that he is a Charan, and as proof, he immediately composed a couplet in praise of the warrior Samra Deora, who died heroically fighting in that war.

The Maharao was extremely pleased to hear the verse and upon discovering the Charan identity; brought him along in his own doli (palanquin) and got him treated for his wounds. Rao Surtan Singh, pleased with the talent of Dursa, asked him stay with him and offered the position of Prolpat (Keeper of the Fort) of his fort. Dursa Ji accepted and he was awarded the jagir of 4 villages named Peshua, Jhankar, Ound, and Sal. After that Dursa Ji stayed in Sirohi.

Mahakavi Dursa understood the political motives of the then Mughal rulers and never failed to convey his thoughts through his poems. In Rajasthan, when he reached Mewar, Maharana Amar Singh himself gave a grand welcome to Dursa and received him at the Badi Pol.

Dursa Arha participated as one of the leaders in the Dharna of Auwa protest by Charans in 1586 AD, against Mota Raja Udai Singh of Marwar.

== Fiefdoms under the rule of Dursa Arha ==
Und (उंड), Dhundla, Natal Kudi, Panchetiya, Jaswantpura, Godavas, Hingola Khurd, Lungia, Peshua, Jhankhar, sal, Dagla, Varal, Sheruwa, Peruwa, Raipuria, Dutharia, Kangdi, Tasol. Apart from these, Raja Rai Singh of Bikaner awarded four villages as fief, which is confirmed by the history of Bikaner.

== Buildings and Monuments ==
Constructions commissioned in respective feudal holdings:-

=== Peshua ===
1. Dursalav Peshua (Pond)

2. Baleshwari Mata Mandir (Temple)

3. Kanako De Sati Smarak (Memorial)

4. Peshua Ka Shashan Thada

=== Jhankhar ===
1. Futela Talav (Pond)
2. Jhankar Ka Thada

=== Panchetiya ===
1. Kisnalav Pachetiya (Pond)

2. Shiva Mandir (Temple)

3. Dursashyam Mandir (Temple)

4. Kalia Mahal (Palace)

5. Dholiya Mahal (Palace)

=== Hingola Khurd ===
1. Higonla Mahal (Palace)
2. Higola Ka Talav (Pond)

=== Raipuria ===
1. The construction of Bawdi (Stepwell)

This stepwell was constructed in the Raipura village in the princely state of Mewar, from where the water reached Panchetia (Marwar), because, after the Auwa Dharna by Charans, Dursa-ji had abandoned the water of Marwar.

== Awards by Kings in honor of Dursa Arha ==
Lakh Pasav or Crore Pasav were state honors conferred upon the eminent Charans in the medieval period. When great Charans visited the court of a Rajput ruler, they were honored by the kings in a state honor which included elephants or palanquins and horses.

Crore Pasav Awards:

- 1 crore pasav by Rai Singh Ji Bikaner
- 1 crore pasav by Rao Suratan Singh Sirohi
- 1 crore pasav by Man Singh Amer
- 1 crore pasav by Maharana Amar Singh Mewar
- 1 crore pasav by Maharaja Gaj Singh Marwar
- 1 crore pasav by Jam Satti
- 3 crore pasav by the Mughal Emperor Akbar (not used for personal things but spent in the welfare of the people i.e. spent in the construction of Talaab (Ponds), Bawdi (Stepwells), Kuwa (Wells), etc.)

== Death and legacy ==
Dursa was subjected to a childhood of acute poverty but demonstrated a talent for poetry and administration that brought him great wealth and respect. He took part in many royal courts, including those of Bikaner, Jodhpur, and Sirohi. He also enjoyed a good relationship with Akbar, the Mughal emperor.

Dursa Arha had 2 wives and had 4 sons from them, namely, Bharmal, Jagmal, Sadul, Kamji and Kisnaji. He also additionally had an issue from a paswan (concubine) he kept.

He spent his last days in his son Kisnaji's house at Panchetiya village, where he died in 1655.

On his death, along with his two wives, one paswan and two concubines committed sati.

== Works ==
The poems written by Dursa Arha mostly relate the heroism and manliness of the rulers of that time but also chronicle many mundane matters. He treated the achievements of his subjects as individuals even when they were constantly at odds with each other, as in the case of his writings about Akbar and Maharana Pratap. He expressed his deep faith in the Hindu religion, appreciated the bravery of Hindu heroes and wrote of the injustice of the Mughals. However, literary analysis of the Virud Chihattari poem associated with him, including the extremely harsh words used to describe Akbar, suggests that work and also the smaller Gajagata were at least not all of his own writing.

His major works are:

- Virud Chihattari (in honour of Maharana Pratap)
- Doha Solanki Viramdevji ra
- Jhulana Rav Surtan ra
- Marsiya Rav Surtan ra
- Jhulana Raja Mansingh Macchvaha ra
- Jhulana Ravat Megha ra
- Git Raji sri Rohitasji ra
- Jhulana Rav Amarsingh Gajsinghota (heroic poetry of Rao Amarsingh of Nagaur)
- Kirta Bhavani
- Mataji ra Chhand
- Sri Kumar Ajjaji na Bhuchar Mori ni Gajagat
