= Dhandhaniya Sasan =

- Location in Rajasthan, India Dhandhaniya Sasan (India)
- Coordinates: 26°18′34.4″N 72°33′54.1″E
- Country: India
- State: Rajasthan
- District: Jodhpur
- Tehsil: Balesar
- Elevation: 273 m (896 ft)

Population (2001)
  - Total: 901

Languages
  - Official: Hindi
- Time zone: UTC+5:30 (IST)
- PIN: 342001
- ISO 3166 code: RJ-IN

Dhandhaniya Sasan is a village in Balesar, Jodhpur district, Rajasthan, India.

== History ==
The ancient name of Dhandhaniya village was Ratnakar. This village was given as Jagir to the Charans by Inda (Pratihar) Rajputs. The main ancestors of this village were Depoji Lalas, Ratanji Lalas, Junjhar Daan, Bhopdan Lalas. The family goddess of the charans here is "Shri Dugaya Mata". People of Lalas Gotra worship "Sheni Mata". Here Dhandhaniya and Dhandhaniya Barda were one and the same village. Dhandhaniya Barda village was given in dowry to the charans of Varnasur caste.
