= Nainsi ri Khyat =

17th-century Marwari & Dingal text chronicaling the history of Marwar

- Author: Muhnot Nainsi
- Language: Rajasthani
- Publication place: India

Nainsi ri Khyat (or 'Khyat of Nainsi') is a late 17th-century Marwari & Dingal text chronicling the history of Marwar. Its author Muhnot Nainsi, an official of Marwar State, based the Khyat (or chronicle) on the Charan accounts and the traditional Rajasthani Vat(or bat) as well as local administrative records. Nainsi-ri-Khyat is considered to be the most prominent of khyats. The Khyat contains a collection of bats as well as kavitts, dohas, and vanshavallis (genealogies).

The Khyat includes a comprehensive account of the genealogies and histories of the various ruling dynasties in the regions of Rajasthan and Gujarat including Marwar, Mewar, Jaisalmer, Sirohi, Amer, Dhundhar, Kutch, Gujarat, Tharparkar, and Saurashtra. The histories of the Chauhans, Rathores, Kachhwahas and Bhatis are dealt with in great detail. The Khyat extensively mentions the battles fought and men who died fighting; along with the names of forts, towns, hills and rivers.

The present day Nainsi ri Khyat is based on the 1843 version by Panna Vithu, who rediscovered the lost text and updated it with the information & events of the 18th & 19th century.

== Author ==
Muhnot Nainsi, the author of this Khyat, was however not a Charan, but an Oswal mutsaddi in the court of Jaswant Singh of Marwar. Early in his professional career, Nainsi was appointed successively as the hakim (administrative head) of various parganas in Marwar. He remained the Diwan of Marwar from 1658 till he lost favour with Jaswant Singh in 1666 following which he was imprisoned.

After the death of Muhnot Nainsi, his son Karamsi left the service of Maharaja Jaswant Singh and he, along with his family, joined the service under Rao Raisingh in Nagaur. Raisingh died suddenly on May 29, 1676, after being ill for two-three days in Solapur village. On Raisingh's sudden death, his officers asked vaidya (physician) the reason for his death. The physician, from Gujarat, replied in Gujarati that 'Karmano Dosh Hai' implying that it is fault of Karma (destiny). But the chieftains of Raisingh interpreted that Karamsi (son of Nainsi) had poisoned their master. Due to this, Karamsi was executed and orders were sent Nagaur to kill rest of his family. Thus, most of Nainsi's family was killed and only 2 young sons of Karamsi were able to escape to Bikaner with the help of servants.

== Rediscovery ==
The credit for the rediscovery and revival as well as systematic re-organization of Nainsi ri Khyat goes to Panna Vithu. Vithu Panna was a 19th-century Dingal poet and scholar from Bikaner who rediscovered the text and prepared a copy in 1843.

After the murder of Muhnot Nainsi and his entire family, his entire property and belongings were captured by Indra Singh. Since then, the manuscript changed many hands. It is said there were copies made of the original text but none have survived. Many of the Vats in Nainsi ri Khyat were added into the Rajasthani Vat literature collection when it was being prepared in the latter half of the 18th century. Therefore, some portions of Nainsi ri Khyat, were circulated and its popularity had spread in the region including Bikaner. Though uncertain of when and how, Nainsi ri Khyat somehow reached Bikaner.

In Bikaner, Panna Vithu found the Khyat and prepared its copy in 1843, while also adding his own contributions wherever he felt necessary. Due to these additions, there are mentions of events or lists related to rulers, chieftains etc. even after 1666 AD at some places. Thus, whatever systematic form this khyat gets today is the result of Panna Vithu's reorganisation of the text. And all historical copies of the Khyat available today are the copies of Panna Vithu's version.

== Sources ==
This khyat depends upon the Charan accounts in order to put together a comprehensive history of the Rajput clans. At places, Nainsi acknowledges the individual Charans who authored these compositions and elsewhere refers to the anonymous source as '..aa bat suni hai' (this has been heard).

== Period of authorship ==
The Khyat was compiled from 1650 through 1665 during which period Nainsi served as the Dewan of Marwar.

== Events chronicled in the Khyat ==
The book opens with a description of the jagirs held by Maharaja Jaswant Singh in 1664 A.D. Then the history of Marwar is narrated from beginning, with the Pratihar rule in Mandore and the arrival of Rao Siha Setramot whose descendants laid the foundation of the Rathore kingdom. The earliest date mentioned is the year 1427 of the Vikram era. The dated history begins with the accession of Rao Jodha (1453 AD).

The first 20 reigns of the Marwar rulers covering a period of 260 years are very briefly dealt with, with comparatively few pages being devoted to them. However, the five reigns from Rao Maldeo (1532 AD) to Raja Sur Singh (died 1619) occupies a larger portion of the khyat while the last two reigns-a period of 45 years-occupies the largest part.

After the history, a description of the various villages of the Marwar State is given, arranged by respective parganas. It starts with a historical introduction of each Pargana, then the average revenue of every village in the pargana compared with the actual income for the years 1716, 1717, and 1718, of the Vikram era.

In the description of battles, a list of the killed and the wounded is provided, while the names of others that took part in the battles are also sometimes mentioned. The Khyat traces the origins of various Rajput clans to celestial sources as well as older Kshatriya clans like Gahadwalas of Kannauj. It contains the genealogies of various Rajput groups including Rathore, Sisodiya, Bhati, Jadeja, Chauhan, Gohil, Solanki, Sodha, and Kachhwaha.

== List of khyats & vats in the text ==
1. Sisodiyāṃ rī khyāta
2. Būṃdī rā dhaṇiyāṃ rī khyāta
3. Vāgaḍaḍiyā cahūvāṃṇā rī pīḍhī
4. Vāta dahiyāṃ rī
5. Būṃdelāṃ rī vāta
6. Vāratā gaḍhabaṃdhava rā dhaṇiyāṃ rī
7. Bāta sīrohī rā dhaṇiyāṃ rī
8. Bhāyalāṃ rajapūtāṃ rī khyāta
9. Vāta cahuvāṃṇāṃ sonagarāṃ rī
10. Vāta sācora rī, boḍaāṃ rī, khociyāṃ rī
11. Bāta aṁahalavāḍaā pāṭanrī
12. Vāta solaṃkiyāṃ pāṭaṇa āyāṃ rī
13. Vāta rudramālo prāsāda siddharāva karāyo tiṇa rī
14. Vāta solaṃkiyāṃ khairāāṃ rī, desūrī rā dhaṇiyāṃ rī
15. Kachavāhāṃ rī khyāta
16. Vāta gohilāṃ kheḍarā dhaṇiyāṃ rī
17. Paṃvārāṃ rī utapata, Vāta paṃvārāṃ rī
18. Aāṃkhalā jāgalavā, rāyasī mahipālota
19. Soḍhāṃrī khyāta Vāta pārakara soḍhāṃ rī
