= Khalida Brohi =

Pakistani activist

- خالدہ بروہی
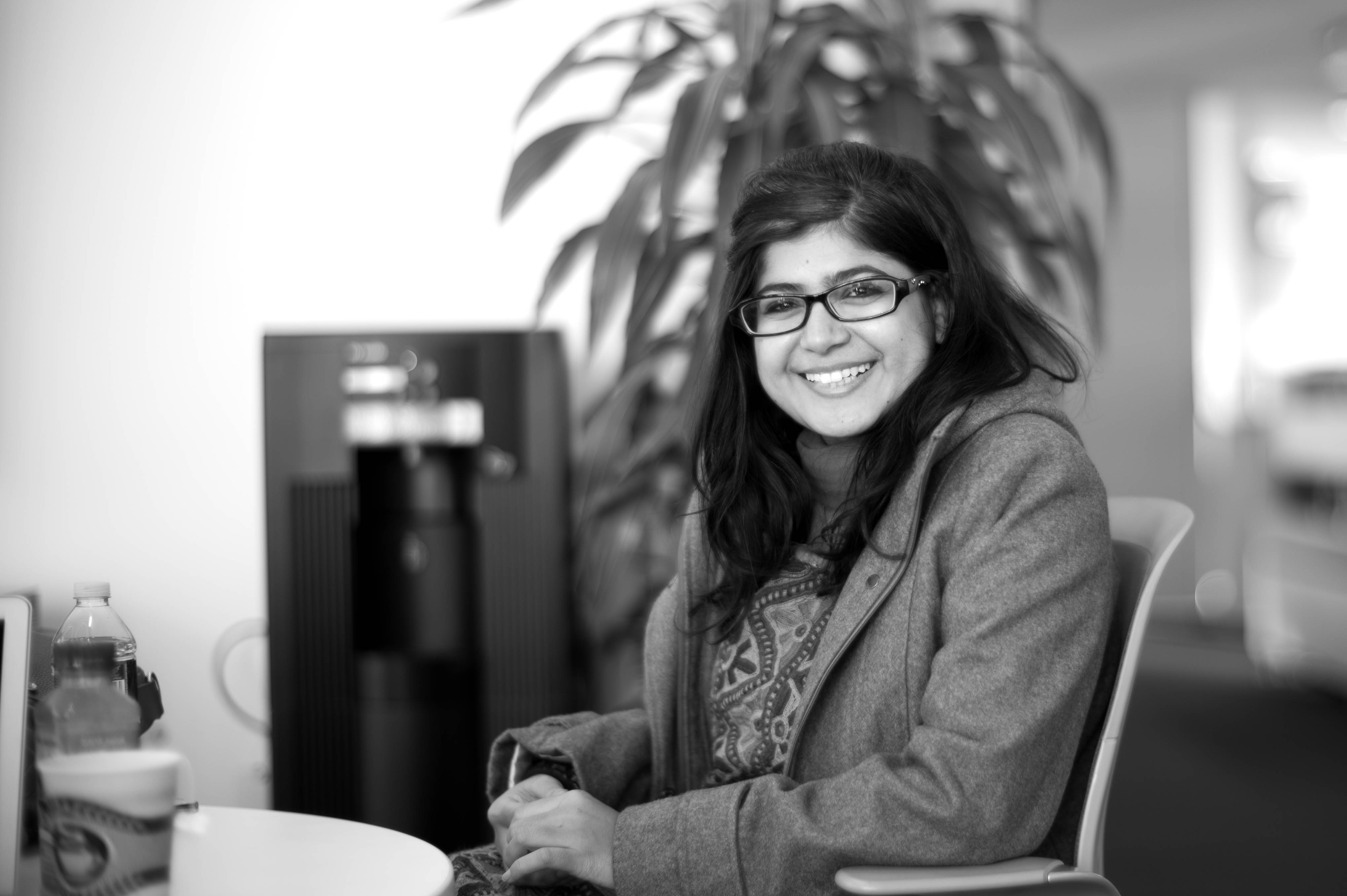
- Born: Khalida Brohi; Hyderabad, Sindh, Pakistan
- Citizenship: Pakistani
- Education: Karachi University
- Occupations: Social Entrepreneur, Women's Rights Activist
- Years active: 2005–present
- Known for: Sughar Foundation + The Chai Spot
- Website: Official website

Khalida Brohi is a Pakistani activist for women's rights and a social entrepreneur. She is a member of the Brahui indigenous tribe of Balochistan, and now has been settled in United States after her marriage.

== Biography ==
=== Childhood ===
Khalida Brohi grew up in a small village in the province of Balochistan, Pakistan. Her parents had been married in a practice known as an exchange marriage, or watta satta. Her mother was 9 years old at the time, her father was 13. Brohi, the second oldest, was born two years later. She became the first girl in her village to go to school, and the first in her tribe to be educated. Brohi grew up in poverty, but her parents were keen to give their children opportunities they never had. When Brohi was very young, her parents moved them from the mud home which they enjoyed with extended family in Kotri to the city of Hyderabad in Sindh province in order to seek better opportunities. There they lived in a slum community, where her father worked a number of jobs, including as a part-time journalist, in order to earn the equivalent of just $6 per month. In Hyderabad, Brohi and her brother were sent to school with the little money that their father earned. The family grew and moved many more times, eventually landing in the slums of Karachi where Brohi continued her education. She had planned to study medicine and become the first doctor in her tribe, already an unusual path for girls, when an event changed everything. Her good friend and cousin were killed in the name of honor for falling in love with a boy who was not her betrothed.

=== Early Activism ===
Brohi was 16 when she decided to leave school and pursue justice for her cousin and all women and girls who become victims of honor killings. Her cousin had been murdered because she wanted to marry a person she loved instead of someone her family chose. Brohi began her activism by writing poetry about the experience and reading it at any event that would allow her to speak.

==== WAKE UP Campaign Against Honor Killings ====
Brohi was soon discovered by organizations fighting for women's rights and was invited to participate in conferences and workshops focused on ending honor killings and domestic violence. In 2008, she joined WAKE UP, an international organization committed to ending domestic violence. Using Facebook, Brohi organized WAKE UP rallies to pressure the national government of Pakistan to close the loopholes in the law that allow honor killings and domestic abuse. Her Facebook campaign garnered thousands of international followers and led to numerous demonstrations. It generally succeeded in raising awareness about the issue of honor killings both at home and abroad. In 2006 the Society Act broadened protections for women.

==== Youth and Gender Development Program ====
Despite the success of the WAKE UP campaign, Brohi realized that the awareness she was creating in Karachi and globally was not reaching the women and communities who were suffering from domestic violence and the custom of honor killings. In response, Brohi launched the Youth and Gender Development Program (YGDP). This initiative began as a weekly gathering of young women to discuss economic opportunities in their communities. However, with the backing of the UNHRC, it quickly expanded into skills-training programs for both women and men that taught computer and cottage industry manufacturing skills, while simultaneously educating participants about women's rights under the law and in Islam. The success of the program inspired Brohi to expand the idea and create an organization with a broader reach, leading to the founding of Sughar in 2009.

==== Sughar ====
Brohi recalls that in response, her father told her, "don't cry, strategize." Instead of openly protesting, she created the Sughar Empowerment Society, which is a non-profit organization which helps women in Pakistan learn skills related to "economic and personal growth." Sughar means "skilled, confident woman" in Urdu. The Sughar Empowerment Society provides women in the villages of Pakistan with income from their work, and the ability to "challenge negative cultural beliefs with education and information about women's rights." The group allows Brohi to change cultural perceptions from within, instead of openly protesting. By 2013, there were 23 centers, serving 800 women who learn about "gender equality, preventing domestic violence, girls' education and women's rights," all while they are creating work to be sold. The type of work the women create is traditional embroidery which is then sold to the fashion industry. Brohi would like to include a million women in Sughar within the next ten years, she said in 2013.

While Brohi has been praised for her activism both inside and outside of Pakistan, she has also been threatened with violence for her work, including being shot at and bombed.

=== Social Entrepreneurship ===
One of the Sughar's initiatives was to create a tribal fashion brand which it called, Nomads, and featured products made by the Sughar women. Nomads debuted with an internationally acclaimed fashion show in 2012.

In 2015, Brohi married David Barron, an American convert to Islam, in a rare love marriage because of their different cultural and social backgrounds. Together the couple founded The Chai Spot in Sedona, Arizona, a peace-building social enterprise focused on promoting Pakistani arts and hospitality, while at the same time providing uplifting opportunities for women and youth in Pakistan. In 2018, Khalida and David opened their second Chai Spot in Manhattan.

== Awards, honors and works ==
- Forbes 30 Under 30 Asia: Social Entrepreneurs, 2016
- The Buffett Institute's Emerging Global Leader Award at Northwestern University, 2016
- MIT Media Lab Director's Fellow, 2014
- Martin Luther King Angel Award by The King Center, 2014
- Women of Excellence Award by Ladies Fund Pakistan 2014
- Forbes 30 Under 30: Social Entrepreneurs 2014
- Newsweek 25 Under 25
- Young Women in Business Award by Women Development Department Government of Sindh, Pakistan 2012
- Azm-e-Alishan (Magnificent Goal) Award by TV-ONE Channel Pakistan 2012
- Young Champion Award by National University of Singapore 2010
- Unseasonable Fellowship Award at The Unreasonable Institute 2010
- Fellowship Award at Paragon100 Foundation for Young Social Entrepreneurs
- YouthActionNet® Young Social Entrepreneur Fellowship Award 2008
- Ashoka Staples Young Social Entrepreneur Competition Finalist 2008

Her work with Sughar was noticed by Forbes, where she was recognized as part of Forbes 30 under 30 in 2014. In 2014, she became part of the second cohort of fellows with the MIT Media Lab, at the Massachusetts Institute of Technology. Brohi was also the subject of a documentary by Sharmeen Obaid-Chinoy, Seeds of Change, which was set to release in 2014. In October 2014, she gave a TED talk at TEDGlobal 2014 where she discusses her activism against honor killings.
