= Bavji Chatur Singhji =

Indian yogi and poet (1880–1929)

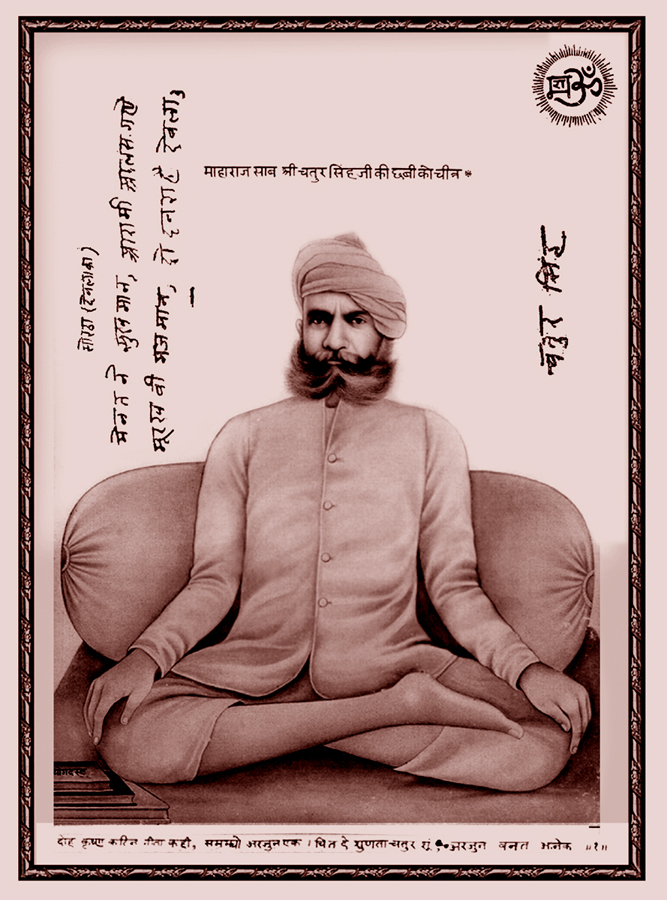
- Maharaj Chatur Singhji
- Born: 9 February 1880; Karjali Haveli, Udaipur, Rajasthan, India
- Died: 1 July 1929 (aged 49)
- Title: Sant-Kavi
- Spouse: Laad Kunwar
- Parents: Maharaj Surat Singh (father); Rani Krishna Kunwar (mother)

Lok-Priya Sant-Kavi Maharaj Chatur Singhji, also known as Bavji Chatur Singhji, (February 9, 1880 – July 1, 1929) was a renowned saint-poet of Rajputana (now Rajasthan, India) recognized as an adept yogi and commemorated as the Patanjali and Valmiki of Rajasthan.

== Beginning as a Saint ==
Bavji lived during the reign of Maharana Fateh Singh (Reign 1884–1930, the 73rd Maharana) who was his uncle. The untimely demise of his wife in the year 1907 and then the adult issueless daughter one year after her marriage drove him further towards spiritual pursuits. He shifted from the Karjali Haveli in Udaipur to Telion-ki-Sarai, where the present-day BN College is located, and then to a modest cottage (KOTRI) on HAWA MAGRI (airy hill) at Sukher (N24° 38' 29" : E073° 43' 08", elevation 613m), a village of Karjali jagir, 10-km north of Udaipur, now on National Highway # 8. Thereafter he moved to a similar modest setup at the other Karjali thikana village Nauwa (N24° 41' 29" : E073° 48' 11", elevation 584 m), 22 km east of Udaipur, because it is widely believed that Singhi HRISHI and other Puranic saints had their Ashram (hermitage at N24° 42' 08" : E073° 45' 55", elevation 701m ) in this serene valley within the geologically significant Aravalli hills. Bavji also wrote several letters to his friends, relatives, and associates, which are also highly enlightening, some of these have been published by the recipients. He also published his thoughts in magazines and newspapers.

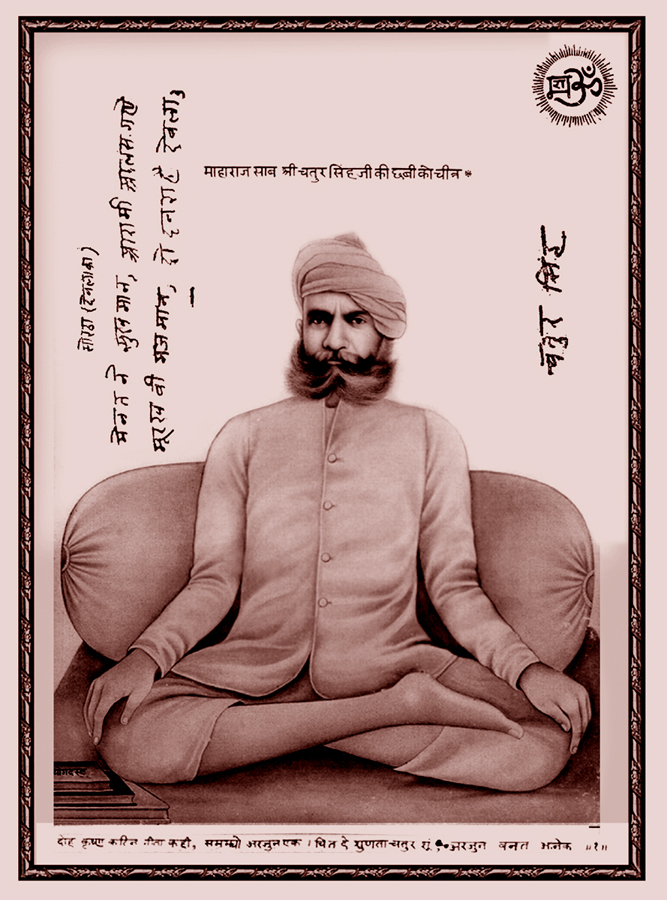
1. A hand-drawn portrait of Bavji, by the renowned Chittara (artist) Panna Lal, dressed in typical coarse hand-spun cloth (REJA) and his typical headdress (PHENTA), seated in YOGASAN MUDRA (c. 1925)

A photograph of Bavji wearing an overcoat (c.1915).

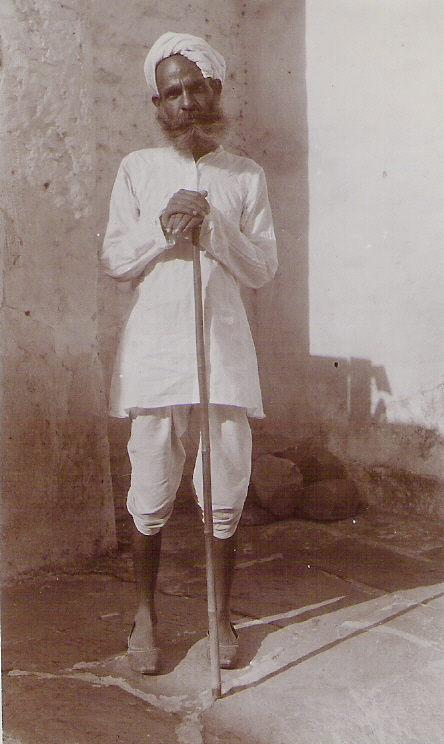
A photograph of Bavji in his daily simple dress (c.1927).

The earliest photographer of Udaipur, Madan Lal took this family portrait in the year AD 1888 of Maharaj Surat Singhji of Karjali (Center) with his four sons L-R, Kr. Tej Singh, followed by the eldest son Kr. Himmet Singh and second son Kr. Laxman Singh followed by young Bavji.

A photograph of Bavji Chatur Singhji, left, with his Guru Thakur Gumaan Singhji (c. 1913)

A photograph of Bavji Chatur Singhji holding his grand nephew Bhanwar Man Singh, the second son of Kr. Jagat Singh of Karjali (c.1927)

Handwriting and signature of Bavji Chatur Singhji.

7

8

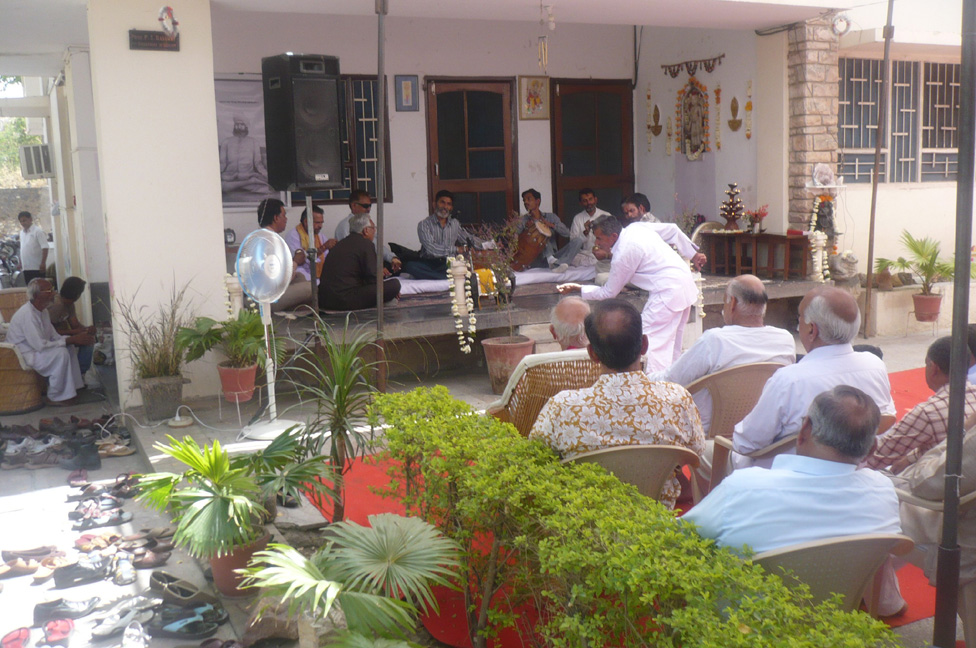
9

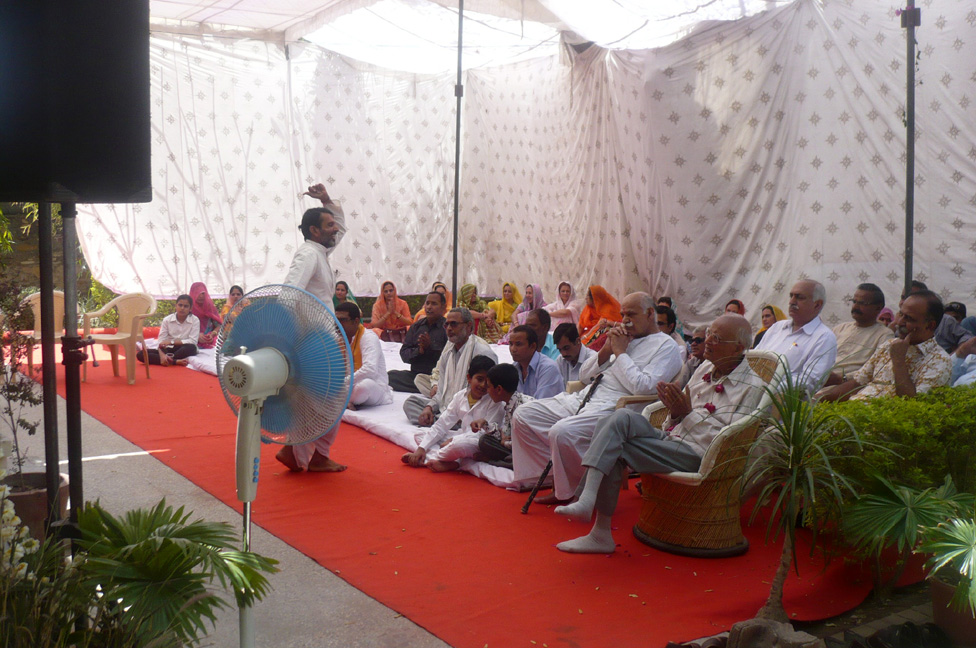
10
