= Kaviraja Bankidas Ashiya =

Indian poet and historian (1771–1833)

Shri Kaviraja Bankidas Asiya
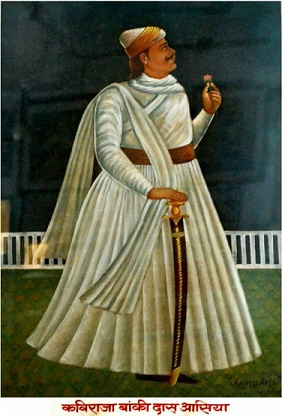
- Kaviraja Bankidas Asiya, Rajkavi of Marwar
- Born: 1771; Bhandiyawas, Barmer, Rajasthan
- Died: 1833 (aged 61–62); Jodhpur
- Known for: Rajasthani Literature and History
- Notable work: Bankidas Ri Khyat; Bankidas Granthavali
- Website: https://www.charans.org/bankidas-asia/

Kaviraja Bankidas Ashiya (1771–1833) was a Rajasthani poet, warrior and scholar. He was born in 1771 (1828 Vikram Samvat) in a Charan family of Ashiya lineage in what is now the Indian state of Rajasthan.

He composed between 1803 and 1833. He wrote several religious poems, didactic poems and also on the then situation of the society.

== Introduction ==
Kaviraja Bankidas Asiya was born in the village of Bhandiawas of Pachpadra Pargana in Jodhpur state (also known as the Kingdom of Marwar) to Fateh Sinhji Ashiya. He is considered the best poet of the Rajasthani (Dingal) language of his time. Bankidas was the Raj-Kavi of Marwar (Jodhpur) kingdom during the rule of Man Singh of Jodhpur.

He authored 26 books, of which "Bankidas Ri Khyat" is considered his most prominent work. This book was written in a style that was different from the prevalent writing tradition. It is a collection of 2000 commentaries written on the events related to the history of Rajasthan.

Bankidas was considered an Aśu-Kavi, an extempore poet who could compose poetry off-hand (i.e. without preparation). Bankidas is also known as a chronicler of history and a knowledgeable scholar of Sanskrit, Dingal, Prakrit, Persian, and Braj Bhasa.

== Career ==
Bankidas wrote most of his poetry at the court of the ruler Man Singh of Jodhpur (1803–1843), where he was awarded the title Kaviraja (King-Poet). According to the tradition, Bankidas was the poet-mentor of Man Singh, who also wrote poetry. Bankidas lost favour in Man Singh's eyes when he backed Man Singh's son Chatra Singh in his quest of the throne and got himself exiled and stripped of his land-grant. But, eventually Man Singh forgave Bankidas and reinstated his jagir(feudal holdings) “since he was a Charan”.

Kaviraja Bankidas was accorded considerable fame during his lifetime and by subsequent generations of poets and historians. Thus, much of Bankidas's work and data about his life have been well-researched, in particular through the compilation of his religious poetry, eulogies, and historical prose-chronicles intermixed with poetry published under the title Baṃkidāsa Graṃthavalī, which continues to be an important source for the writing of Rajasthani history.

=== Concern For The Society ===
Kaviraja Bankidas was moved by the poverty and misery of the people of Thali (a tract in North-West Rajasthan) and contrasted it to the cool comforts enjoyed by the ruling elite living in the Puras. He also took note of the prosperity of Jat peasant proprietors and the unfair trade practices of the vaniks (traders).

== Anti-Colonial Stance ==
Kaviraja Bankidas is considered as one of the last great, traditional poets of the Dingal tradition and one of the first “modern” poets who voiced nationalist sentiments, while employing medieval martial ideals to express anti-British sentiments.

Bankidas witnessed the waning of Mughal dominion and the advance of the British East India Company’s military and political ambitions aimed at administrating large parts of Rajputana.

52 years before the mutiny of 1857 i.e. 1805 AD, Kaviraja wrote 'Chetavani Ro Geet' (Song of the Warning) and called upon the kings of Rajasthan to avoid the mischief of the English. Although he was the Kaviraja of Jodhpur, he praised the courage and valor of the Jat rulers of Bharatpur.

Kaviraja Bankidas referred to Kilkatta (Kolkata), Kanpur, Lahore, Madras(Chennai), Mamoi (Mumbai), and Trambak while highlighting the expansionist policy of the Company. Around 1804, In the context of celebrating the anti-British posture adopted by Man Singh of Jodhpur for giving shelter to Madhu Raj Bhonsle of Nagpur, he criticized Maharaja Ranjit Singh of Punjab, who had earlier refused to do so. He felt that this cowardly act of Ranjit Singh had tarnished the name of the Sikh gurus. He was also aware of the defeat of Tipu Sultan and described it sympathetically as the ruin of the exalted family of Ali Mansur.

In 1805, Kaviraja Bankidas in one of his very popular poem “Aayo Angrez Mulk Re Upar” called upon Hindus and Muslims both worth being called a man to demonstrate bravery against the British.

== Works ==
His composed poems are:

- Moha Mardana: a didactic poem
- Anyokti Panchasika: an allegorical poem on morality
- Krupana Darpana: ridiculing the misers
- Mavadiya Mijaja: criticizing the effeminate persons
- Chugala Mikha Chapetika: poem against sycophants
- Vaisa Varta: poem condemning the prostitution
- Vidura Battisi: on problems of illegitimate of maid-servants and servants
- Duha Ayasaji Maharaja Devanatha Ra: On spiritual teacher of Maharaja Mansingh of Jodhpur
- Jhamala Thakuran Rupsinghji Ra: on Rup singh, the son of Arjun Singh Udawata
- Santosa Bavani: praising virtues of men and condemning their vices
- Dhavala Pachchisi: On heroism, treating the bull as the symbol of hero
- Niti Manjari: a poem on ethics
- Gangalahari
