= Tumbel =

Charan clan

Tumbel is a clan and division of the Charanas of Gujarat, Sindh, and Balochistan. Historically, they were known for their military services in the kingdoms of Kutch and Nawanagar.

== History ==
=== Origin ===
The most common myths present the Charan as creations of Parvati and Shiva. For the Tumbel, it is said that a Naga maiden Avari or Avad (distinct from 8th century goddess Avad) agreed to marry the Charana on the condition that he would never speak to her. The Charana broke their vow when Avad became pregnant with their fourth son. She released the half-formed child from her womb, placing it in a bowl/shell (tumba), and casting it into the sea. As the child was born unfinished, the lineage descended from it is considered only half a Para (marriage groups among the Kachchela Charanas). And since the boy was discovered in a tumba (shell), the lineage was called Tumbel.

The shell was found along the coast of Makran by a Samma chief, sometimes called Jam Lakhiar, on a pilgrimage to Hinglaj. Considering the child to be a blessing by the goddess, the Samma decides to raise him as his son. As per tradition, it was only during the marriage negotiations that the goddess disclosed to the Samma that Tumbel was a Charana, and that a Charana girl had to be found for him.

=== Migrations ===
The Tumbel Charanas consider the goddess Hinglaj as an ancestral figure predating the 9th century. In the Hala Hills, Hinglaj, referred to as the Kohana-Rani, resided alongside the Tumbel. She inspired this group to serve as missionaries of the divine mother and personally led them to Bela, located in modern-day Baluchistan.

By the 15–16th century, the Tumbel left Sindh and started migrating to Kutch after the Samma rulers converted to Islam. They arrived in Kutch where Jadeja, a sub-branch of the Samma, had established their rule. Aligning with the deposed Jadeja ruler, Jam Rawal, they formed the bulk of his forces and marched southwards in Saurashtra conquering land leading to the formation of Nawanagar State. Abul Fazl mentions the Tumbel as a ruling tribe in the districts of Saurashtra in his text of history, Ain-i-Akbari.

=== Clans ===
The Tumbel affix the title of Jam in their names. The clans common among the Tumbel are the following : 1) Alsura, 2) Barot, 3) Bati, 4) Bhan or Luna, 5) Buchar, 6) Gagia, 7) Ghilva, 8) Gogar, 9) Gungad, 10) Jivia, 11) Karia, 12) Kesaria, 13) Mundhuda, 14) Nandhan, 15) Sagar, 16) Sakhara, 17) Sikhadia, 18) Vanaria, 19) Varia.

== Notable people ==
- Kavi Kag (Dula Bhaya Kag) (1903–1977), saint-poet and writer, mainly known for his work on spiritual poetry relating to Hinduism including his collection called Kagvani; facilitated with Padma Shri (1962)
- Aai Sonal Mata, religious leader and social reformer from Gujarat
- Isudan Gadhvi (Jam Isudan Kheraj) (b. 1982), Indian politician, former media journalist, TV news anchor, and senior Aam Aadmi Party leader from Gujarat
