= Muhnot Nainsi =

17th-century historian and Dewan of Marwar

- Born: 1610; Jodhpur State
- Died: 1670 (aged 59–60); Jodhpur
- Occupations: Writer; Historian
- Writing career
- Language: Dingal; Rajasthani
- Notable works: Nainsi ri Khyat; Marwar Re Paragana Ri Vigat

Muhnot Nainsi (1610–1670) was a medieval historian and Dewan of Rathore ruler Jaswant Singh of Marwar. He is known for his studies of the region now encompassed by the state of Rajasthan in India. He was son of Jaimal Muhnot, who was Senior Office holder under reign of Sur Singh and Gaj Singh Early in his professional career, Nainsi was appointed successively as the hakim (administrative head) of various parganas in Marwar. The extensive, first-hand knowledge he collected of the region informed his later writings. In 1658, he was appointed dewan of Marwar, in which position he served until 1666. The literary works he is most known for are Marwar Ra Pargana Ri Vigat and Nainsi Ri Khyat.

== Early life ==
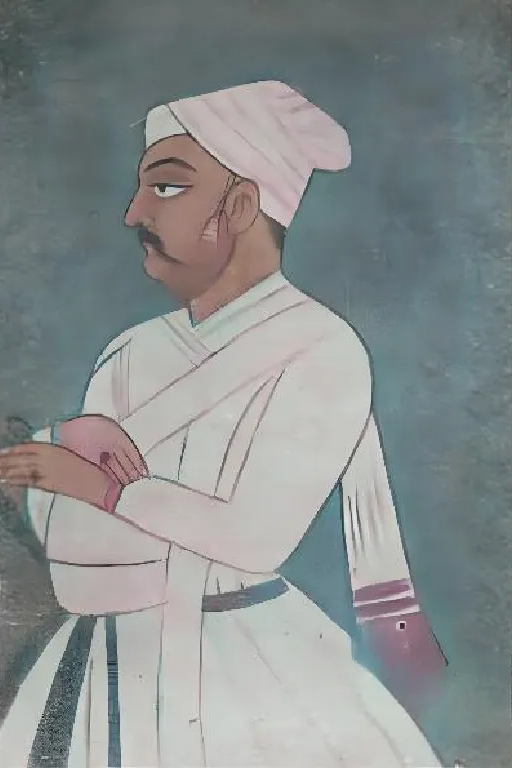

Muhnot Nainsi Jaimilota was born 1611 in the Oswal Jain community. He was the eldest among his 5 brothers. His father was Jaimal Muhnot, a civil servant.

== Nainsi ri Khyat ==
Khyat written by him, is famously known as Nainsi ri Khyat. Gaurishankar Ojha wrote praising it that if this material had become available to Colonel Tod, his 'Rajasthan' would have been of some other way. This book was edited in two parts (Hindi translation) by Ramnarayan Dugad and published in 1982 by Kashi Nagari Pracharini Sabha. In the original Rajasthani, this book was edited by Badri Prasad Sakaria and published in four parts from Rajasthan Oriental Vidya Pratishthan Jodhpur till 1967. In this repute, Nainasi has written the history of the dynasties of almost all the princely states of Rajasthan. In it, the history of Sisodia, Rathores and Bhatis is written in greater detail. By giving the lineage of the first dynasty, later achievements of each ruler have been taken under the title 'Baat' like 'Baat Rao Jodha Ri' etc. Muhnot was alive till Vikram Samvat 1727, so only mention of events up to the early 18th century in Khyat. In this, the genealogy and culture up to the 13th century cannot be said to be so authentic, but the events and events after that are considered reliable. Nainasi has also given the names of the people with whose help he compiled the material. Khyat's language is Takshali Rajasthani.

== Marwar ra Pargana ri Vigat ==
Another notable text by Nainsi is Marwar ra Pargana ri Vigat (An Account of the Districts of Marwar), which describes in detail the seven parganas under Maharaja Jaswant Singh (I), a gazetteer of Marwar. In which the history of each pargana is given at the beginning and then by summarising the different income etc. of the villages of Khalsa and Jagir, its line with the geographical location of each village under the pargana, income of five years and yield of the village Specific things etc. are also mentioned. It also mentions the population of villages and the means of drinking water, well and type of agricultural land. Dr. Narayan Singh Bhati, first edited this book in three parts (19–4) with a detailed role and published it from Rajasthani Oriental Research Institute, Jodhpur.
