= Charan =

Caste in South Asia

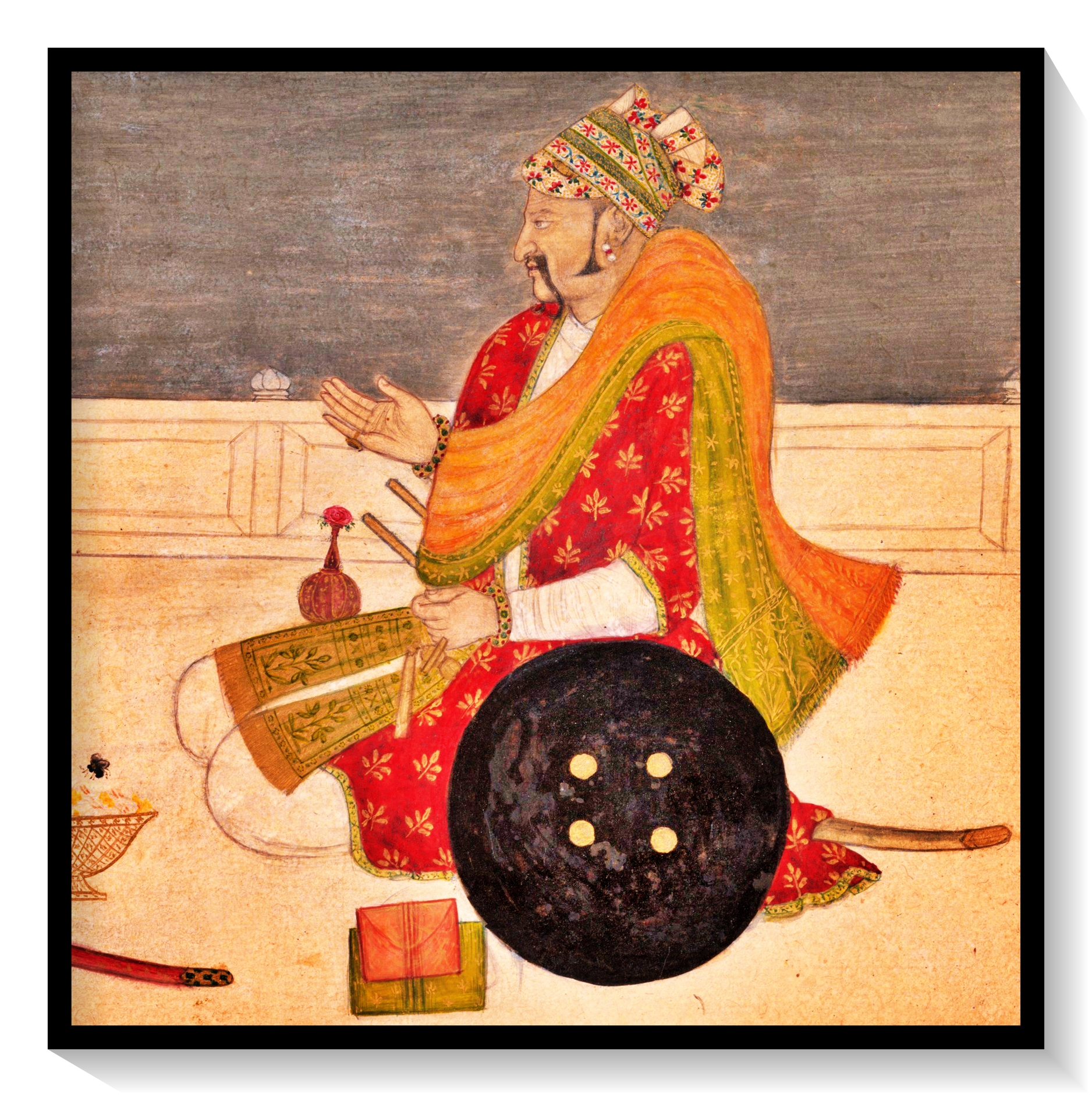
- Painting depicting Charan Gordhan Singh in Bikaner kingdom, 1725 CE (Metropolitan Museum of Art)
- Religions: Hinduism
- Languages: Rajasthani • Marwari • Mewari • Gujarati • Sindhi • Marathi
- Country: India • Pakistan
- Region: Rajasthan • Haryana • Gujarat • Madhya Pradesh • Maharashtra • Sindh • Balochistan

Charan (IAST: Cāraṇ; Sanskrit: चारण; Gujarati: ચારણ; Sindhi: چارڻ; IPA: cɑːrəɳə) is a caste natively residing in the Rajasthan and Gujarat states of India, as well as the Sindh and Balochistan provinces of Pakistan. Historically, Charans have been engaged in diverse occupations like bards, poets, historians, pastoralists, agriculturalists and also administrators, jagirdars and warriors and some even as traders.

== Historical roles and occupations ==
=== Poets and historians ===
Rajasthani and Gujarati literature from the early and medieval period, up to the 19th century, has been mainly composed by Charans. The relationship between Charans and Rajputs is deeprooted in history. As Charans used to partake in battles alongside Rajputs, they were witnesses not only to battles but also to many other occasions and episodes forming part of the contemporary Rajput life. The poems composed about such wars and incidents had two qualities: basic historical truth and vivid, realistic and pictorial descriptions, particularly of heroes, heroic deeds and battles.

The Chāran poetry is mostly descriptive in style and can be categorized in two forms: narrative and stray. The narrative form of Charan poetry goes by various names viz., Rās, Rāsau, Rūpak, Prakās, Chhand, Vilās, Prabandh, Āyan, Sanvād, etc. These poems are also named after metres such as, Kavitt, Kundaliyā, Jhūlaņā, Nīsāṇī, Jhamāl and Veli etc. Poems of stray form also use a variety of such metres. Written in Dingal, the various sources, known as bata (vata), khyata, vigata, pidhiavali, and vamsavali, form the most important body of primary data for the study of the medieval period. They also functioned as oral repositories of ruling dynasties.

Although, for Charans, poetic composition and recitation was only a hereditary 'pastime', subordinate to the primary income producing occupations of military service, agriculture, and horse and cattle trading. Ambitious and talented boys, however, pursued traditional education from other learned Charans for comprehensive guidance. When accepted by them as students, they would receive training in the basics of poetic composition and narration as well as the specialized languages by precept and example, with emphasis on memorization and oral recitation. Students would in turn recite the compositions, constantly improving their style. Knowledge of languages such as Dingal, Sanskrit, Urdu, and Persian was also acquired with the aid of specialized masters. Thus, the subjects studied included not only history and literature, but also religion, music, and astrology.

Renowned Charan poets of the time were part of the royal courts, attaining the rank of Kaviraja or "court-laureate" and assuming positions of great influence. Such learned Charans were exceptionally honoured by the rulers. The rulers bestowed awards whose value amounted to lakh (a hundred thousand) or krore (ten million), hence these were termed as Lakh Pasav or Krore Pasav. These awards consisted of sasan lands, horses, elephants, and ornaments.

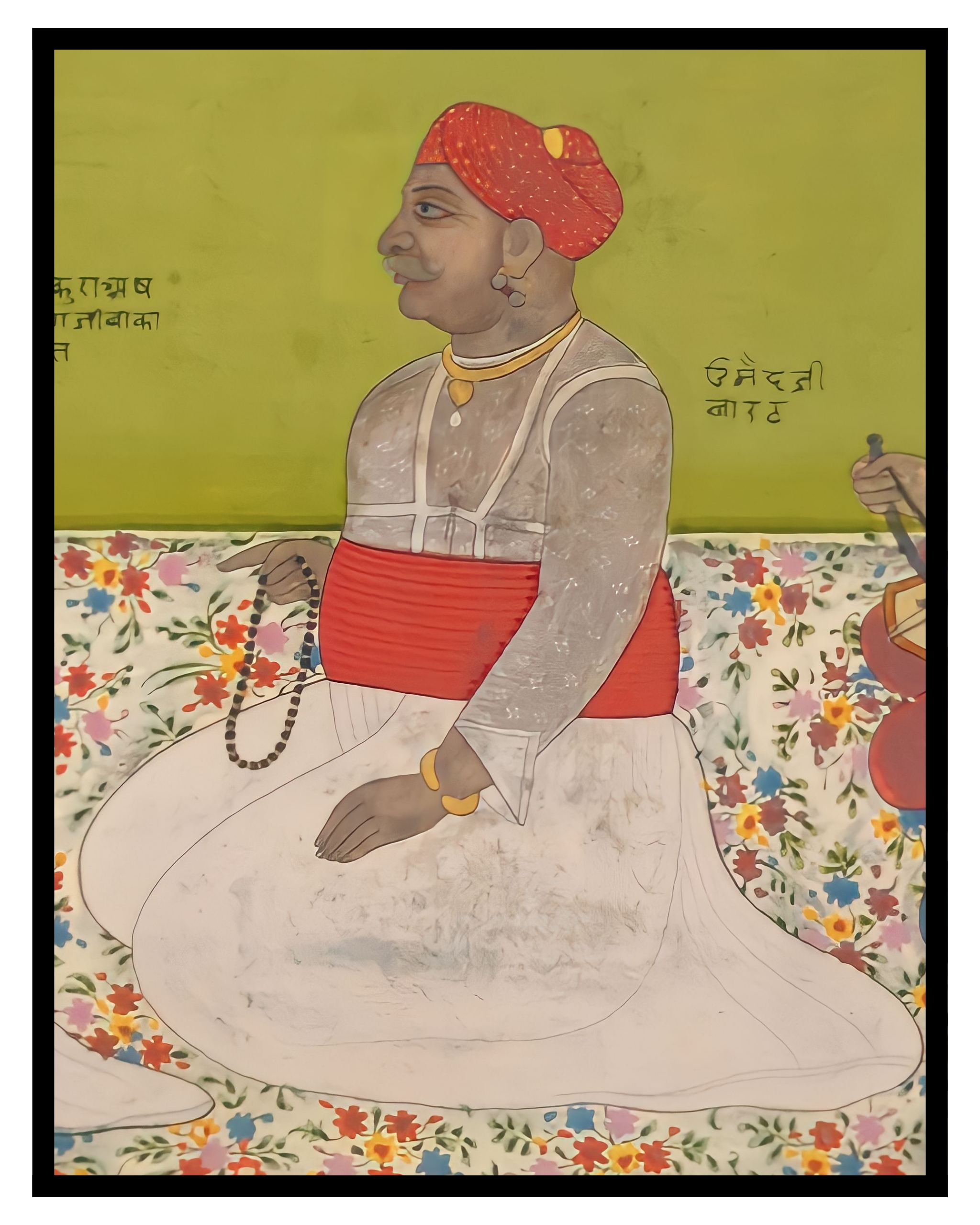
Ummeda Rāma Bāreṭha of Mahund, Alwar State (1810 CE)

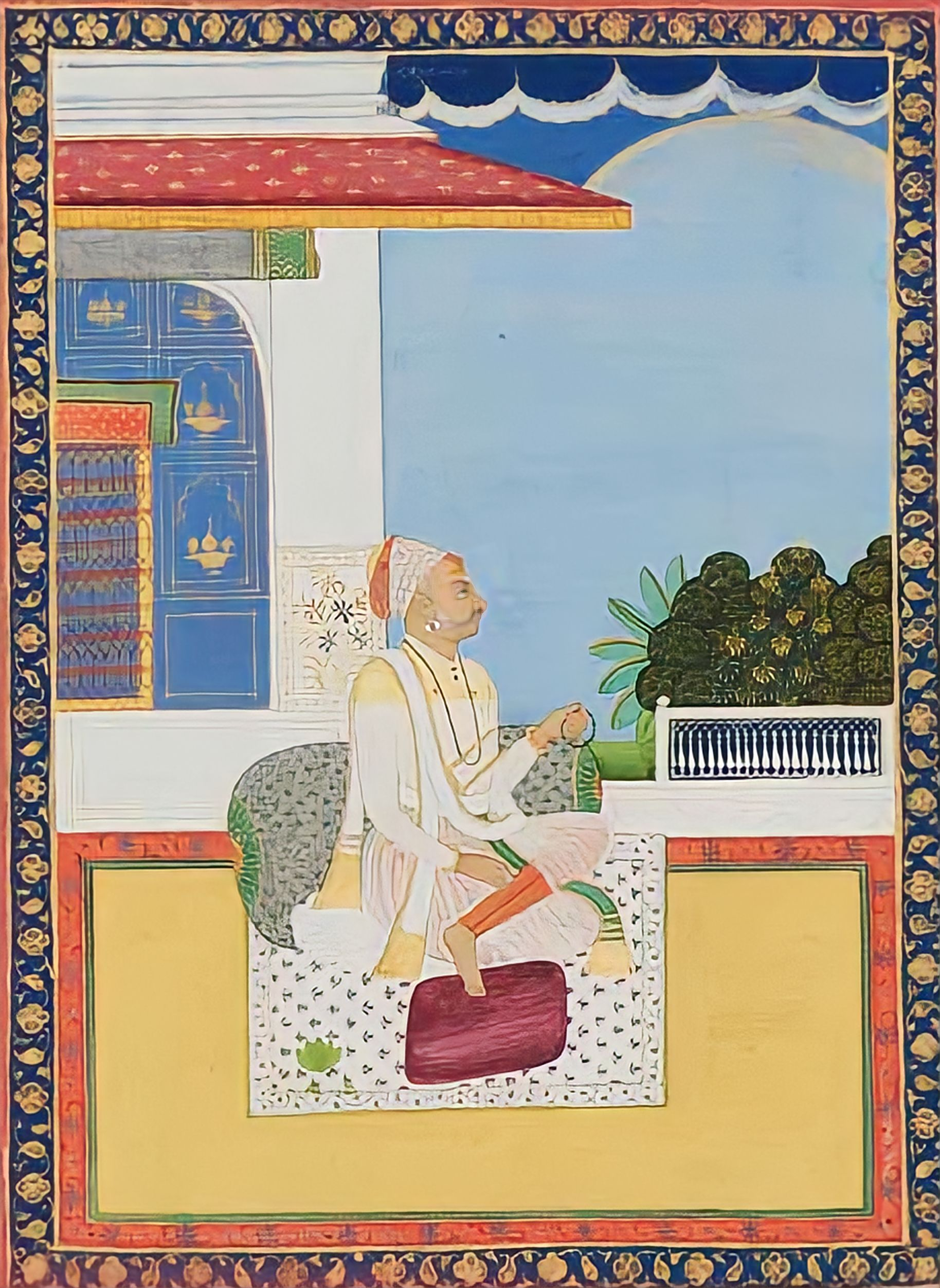
Portrait of Iśvaradāsa Bārahaṭha of Marwar (1830 CE)

=== Administrators ===
As per their administrative and ritual positions, Charans were integral to numerous indigenous courts in the region including Rajputana, Saurashtra, Malwa, Kutch, Sindh, and Gujarat. They served various administrative and diplomatic functions, sometimes as leading state dignitaries.

By nineteenth century, these formed major and minor bureaucratic lineages which played a significant role in the power struggle and the policy formation in the princely states. Recruitment to positions in the political bureaucracy in the nineteenth century states of Rajputana was based on the community and the recognized and established lineages. Charan as an indigenous community with traditions of literacy and service contributed significantly in the senior crown appointments. Persons belonging to such an administrative class, as a result of state service, were also granted jagirs and court honours. During the medieval period, Charans along with Rajputs and Baniyas dominated the administration in princely states. Charans enjoyed intimate relations with the rulers who placed high confidence in them; consequently, they came to play the role of mediators in most of the political matters in the medieval kingdoms prior to British rule.

Some of the prominent Charan administrators holding positions such as of Diwan (Prime Minister) in 19th and 20th century were Kaviraja Shyamaldas of Mewar, Kaviraja Muraridan of Marwar, and Ramnathji Ratnu of Kishengarh. The Ratnu family of Sikar formed one such bureaucratic lineage whose members were Diwans of Sikar, Idar, Kishengarh, and Jhalawad.

=== Warriors and military role ===
Charans were an integral part of the military, administrative, political and social system of the medieval kingdoms. Similar to the Rajputs, with whom they were often associated, Charans would consume meat, alcohol, and participate in martial activities. They were known for their loyalty and were respected by the rulers for their skills in chivalry and sacrifice on the battlefield.

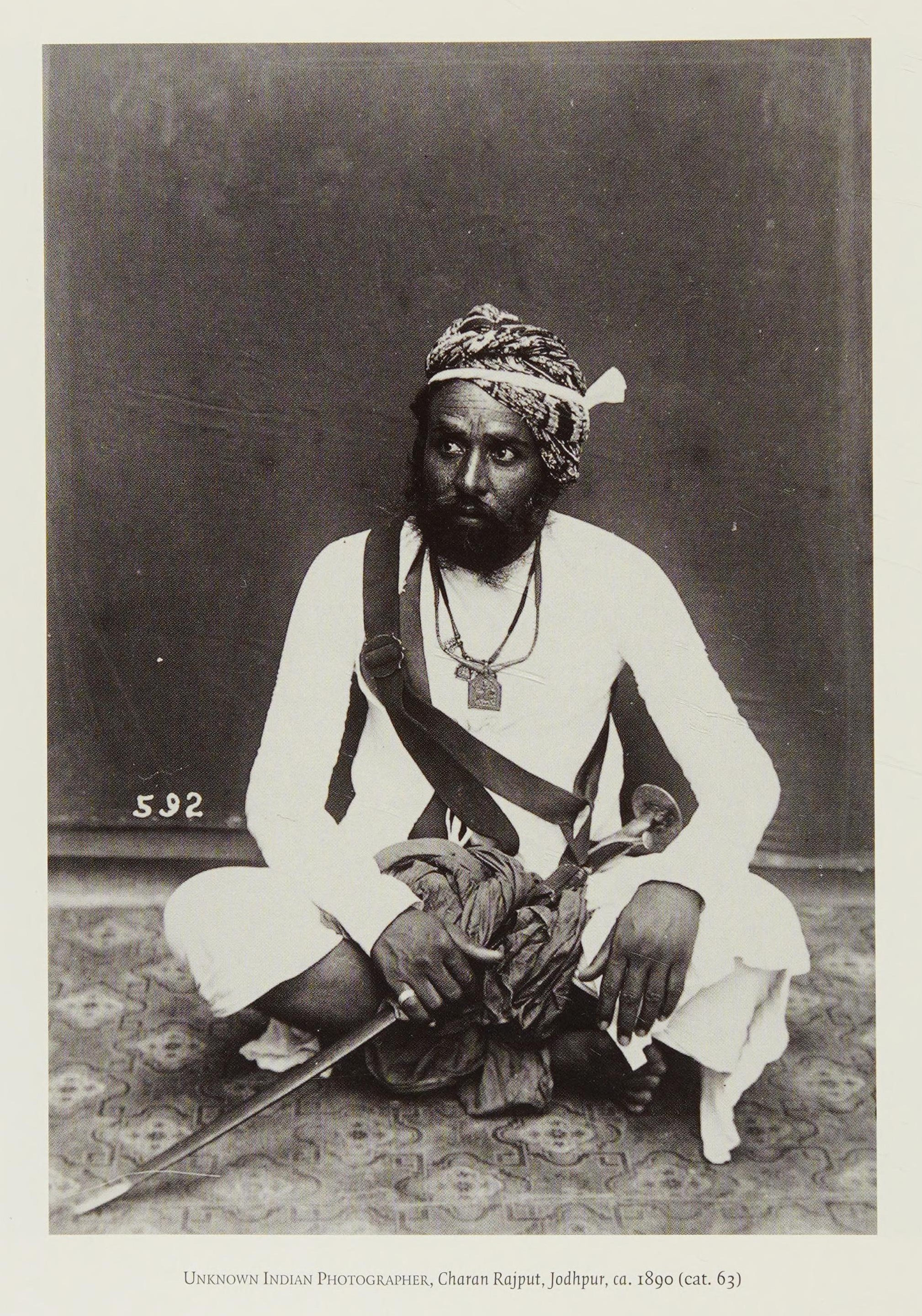
Charan man in Jodhpur State, photographed for the 1891 Census Report

Numerous Charans have fought in the battles of Mewar. The roll of honour during the reigns of various rulers such as Sanga and Pratap contains the names of prominent Charans. Karamsi Ashiya fought in the Battle of Maholi in favour of Udai Singh II against Banvir. In the Battle of Haldighati, many of them fought for Mewar including Charans of Sonyana led by Jaisaji and Keshavji Sauda, as well as Ramaji and Kanhaji Sandu, Govardhan and Abhaychand Boksha, Ramdas Dharmawat, etc.

In the Khilji's invasion of Jalore in 1311 CE, Sahaj Pal Gadan died fighting valiantly alongside Kanhadadeva against Alauddin Khilji. Kanhaji Arha slained Sanga, the Raja of Amber and founder of Sanganer, thus avenging the death of his friend Karamchand Naruka. Hapaji Barhath of Marwar fought for the Mughals in the Battle of Ahmedabad, leading an army of one hundred elephants under his command. Narupal Kavia was a commander in Man Singh's forces during the Mughal conquest of Orissa. During an ambush by Sultan Qatlu Khan's large army, he, Bika Rathor, and Mahesh Das made a last stand and sacrificed their lives while the rest of the imperial force fled.

In the Gujarat region, Charans served in the army in large numbers. The Tumbel clan was especially prominent, with many of its members serving in the army of Jam Raval, the founder of Jamnagar State. Throughout history, the Jadeja rulers of Saurashtra sent troops under the leadership of Charans to fight on various occasions.

In the famous Battle of Dharmat in 1658 CE, four renowned warriors - Khidiya Jagmal Dharmawat, Barhath Jasraj Venidasot, Bhimajal Misran, and Dharmaji Charan - valiantly fought on the side of Maharaja Jaswant Singh and Ratan Singh Rathore and perished. When Durgadas planned the rescue of Ajit Singh, the Battle of Delhi saw Charan Samdan and Mishan Ratan become martyrs for their homeland in their fight against the Mughals. Charan Jogidas, Mishan Bharmal, Sarau, Asal Dhanu and Vithu Kanau were the chosen warriors who escorted Prince Akbar to Sambhaji's court.

Chandidas Charan of Alwar faced off against Nawab Najaf Khan at Thana Gazi for a month halting his march to a standstill until Chandidas was called back to Alwar by Pratap Singh. Bhupati Ram Charan was the General of the Hada army of Kota who made a strong stand in the Battle of Rajamahal. Similarly, Kaviraja Bhairav Dan was the Commandant of the Army of Bikaner State in 19th-century.

At many places in Gujarat, Charans had revolted against the British during the mutiny of 1857. Kandas, the Charan Panchmahal chief, was a trusted ally of the Baroda Resident who sought Kandas' help to gain Charan support for the British. However, Kandas raised Bahadur Shah Zafar's banner, gathering Koli chiefs and retired sepoys from Panchmahal to come to mutineers' aid.

=== Arbitrators and diplomats ===
Charans fulfilled the crucial role of diplomats, guarantors, and arbitrators in political negotiations and financial transactions. No treaties between kings after a war or contracts between patrons and clients were considered valid without a Chāran acting as a guarantor. Since the Charans were deemed sacrosanct and causing them harm was considered a sin, they were chosen as sureties whenever a legal guarantee was required. Therefore, important pacts, engagements, transfers, recovery of debts, transactions, and even the signing of treaties were always presided by a Charan. Records indicate, they also served as sureties for the collection of land revenue from the sixteenth century down to 1816.

In the cases when these contracts were not honoured or when the Charans themselves were subjected to an injustice, they would wound, even immolate, or mutilate themselves, thus casting curse of the death of a Charan on the offender. The mark of the dagger, signifying the threat of self-sacrifice, served as their signature.

Moreover, they were the traditional arbitrators of conflicts between the various Rajput clans or branches. Rajput clans would send their families and children to the homes of Charans for safeguarding during times of violence. The role of messengers and mediators was taken over by Charans in negotiations between hostile or warring groups. They acted as emissaries in times of war. Even the British called upon the Charans to mediate the Saurashtra peace agreements of the early nineteenth century.

The British colonial intervention in the administration of the princely states, in time, brought decline in these functions of the Charans. However, well into the colonial period, Charans continued to perform this long-standing functions of theirs, to serve as witnesses or guarantors in commercial transactions and financial contracts. Prior to the Charans revolting during the Indian Rebellion of 1857, they were part of the `loyal’ Central Gujrat British network, acting as mediators between princes and the people, or princes and the British.

=== Traders and merchants ===
They took advantage of their sacred position by assuming the occupation of carriers and traders as they were exempted from the payment of customs duties in Rajputana and the adjacent regions of Malwa and Gujarat in the pre-colonial period.

Exercising their privilege to transport goods between various states with impunity and utilising the large wealth of cattle as pack animals, Charans were able to establish a "virtual monopoly of trade in North-Western India". Many Charans are said to have become wealthy merchants and money-lenders. Their caravans were considered to be insured against bandits. In Rajasthan, the Kachhela Charans excelled as merchants.

Utilizing their favourable position since they had "exemption from perpetual and harassing imposts...they gradually became chief carriers and traders". In Mallani, Charans were described as "large traders" possessing great privileges as a sacred race being exempted from local dues throughout Marwar.

Charan traders took large caravans of bullocks north to Marwar and Hindustan, and east to Malwa through Gujarat. They traded in various commodities including ivory, coconuts, alum, and dry dates which they take from Kutch while bringing back corn and tobacco from Marwar and Hindustan. Ivory, brought from Africa to Mandvi in Gujarat, was bought by Charan traders in return for grain and coarse cloth. From there, they transported ivory to be sold in Marwar.

By late seventeenth and eighteenth centuries, they emerged as major suppliers of goods and weaponry to the warring armies of Mughal, Rajput, and other factions. They sold their goods in the markets ranging from Punjab to Maharashtra.

The Salt-Trade in Marwar involved thousands of people and pack animals like oxen and camels. Charans along with Pushkarna Brahmins and Bhils were engaged in salt-trade and exempted from the payment of custom duties. Kachhela Charans from Sindhari used to collect salt from Talwara and sell in other parts of Marwar. Charans were seen as, “great traders...who...paid no dues and in troubled times when plunder was rife...although trading with thousands of rupees worth of property were never molested”.

The Charan traders made their encampments as fortified settlements whenever a long hault was required, either due to the long journey or as safeguard against lawless bandits and periodical rains. Sometimes, these fortified settlements evolved as forts such as those of Bhainsrorgarh. Some of the Charan merchants were the privileged carriers of the Rajawaras (kingdoms) and thus had direct communication with the royal household. Their caravans also consisted of armies to safeguard their goods and encampments. Documents of princely states like Kota records the names of several Charans as the affluent merchants of the region with their huge caravans trading with markets in western India.

The establishment of British hegemony in northwestern India and subsequent colonial intervention on trade practices such as monopoly on salt and introduction of railways affected overall trading patterns leading to irreversible decline of communities in transportation business including Charans, Lohanas, and Banjaras. As a result, some of them settled as traders and money-lenders while others took to agriculture.

James Tod in the eighteenth century commented on the Kachhela Charans in Mewar who were traders by profession:

It was a novel and interesting scene: the manly persons of the Charans, clad in the flowing white robe, with the high loose folded turban inclined on one side, from which the mala, or chaplet, was gracefully suspended; the Naiks, or leaders, with their massive necklaces of gold, with the image of the pitresvaras (the ancestors) depending therefrom, gave the whole an air of opulence and dignity.

=== Protectors of mercantile trade ===
The Charans held the reputation of defending the merchandise entrusted to their charge through sword and shield if necessary; or else, if outnumbered, by threatening to take, or even taking, their own life.

Charans were described as "greatest carriers of goods" for delivery in important centres of Malpura, Pali, Sojat, Ajmer, and Bhilwara by acting as escorts(bailers). Throughout Rajasthan, Gujarat, and Malwa (Madhya Pradesh), Charans acted as escorts and protectors of mercantile trade throughout the journey. The route of the caravans was through Suigam(Gujarat), Sanchor, Bhinmal, Jalor to Pali. The inviolability of a Charan along with their knowledge of the trade routes distinguished them as ideal caravan escorts. Caravans of horses, camels and pack oxen carrying various commodities passed through desolate stretches of desert and forested hills which were always under threat of bandits and dacoits. Charans acted as the protectors and escorts. As caravan protectors, "sacred Charans" thwarted the attempts of bandits.

If not strong enough to defend their convoy with sword and shield, they would threaten to kill themselves. Given the position of Charans in the socio-cultural system of the time, the wilful killing of a Charan was equivalent to equally abominable crime of killing a Brahmin. As such, if a Charan did commit suicide over any transgression of the caravans under his guardianship, the marauder-robbers responsible for the suicide were deemed to have "earned the sin of a Charan's death, with all its post-life connotations of hell-fire and damnation." Thus, under the safety of Charans, commodities were transported from one region to another.

=== Horse trade ===
Horse trade was one of the prominent occupations of Charans. Some Charan sub-groups like Kachhela Charans(from Kutch and Sindh) and Sorathia Charans(from Kathiawar) were historically engaged in horse breeding and trading. The common connection of horses also led to bonds between Charans and the Kathi tribe. Some Kuchela Charans settled around Mallani (Barmer, Rajasthan) in western Rajasthan which was notable for its horse-breeding. Marwari horses from this area came to be known as Mallani horses. By the 18th century, most of the horse trade business in the Bikaner kingdom was controlled by Charans, besides Afghans. Charan horse dealers were considered to be very well networked. In another example of the clout of horse-trading Charans, a Charan from the Kachhela subgroup arrived at the court of Marwar ruler, Maharaja Takhat Singh, under the auspices of the sect leader of Nath Sampradaya, and marketed his horses, with 10 horses being directly purchased by the ruler himself.

== Social structure ==
Members of the caste are considered to be divine by a large section of society. Women of the caste are adored as mother goddesses by other major communities of this region including, Khatris and Rajputs. For centuries, Charans were known for their reputation of preferring to die rather than break a promise. Charan society is based on written genealogy. A Charan will consider all the other Charans as equal even if they do not know each other and have radically different economic or geographic status. Charan men are also known as the sacrosanct guides of camel and pack oxen and caravans through Thar desert and as traders in horses, wool and salts, suppliers of food and weaponry to armies.

Anil Chandra Banerjee, a professor of history, has said that

In them we have a combination of the traditional characteristics of the Brahmin and the Kshatriyas. Like the Brahmins, they adopted literary pursuits and accepted gifts. Like the Rajput, they worshipped Shakti and engaged in military activities. They stood at the front gate of the fort to receive the first blow of the sword.

Banerjee's opinion is shared by another historian, G. N. Sharma, who said that

Charans exercise great respectability and influence in Rajasthan. The speciality of the caste is that it combines in its character the characteristics of Rajputs and Brahmans in an adequate manner.

=== Clans and divisions ===
Based on regions inhabited and associated culture, there are multiple endogamous sections among the Charans such as Maru (Rajasthan and Sindh), Kachhela (Kutch), Sorathia (Saurashtra), Parajia etc. Clans among Maru-Charans are Roharia, Detha, Ratnu, Ashiya, Mehru, Kiniya, Sauda, Arha, Dadhivadia, etc. Kachhelas are divided into 7 main exogamous clans: Nara, Chorada, Chunva, Avsura, Maru, Bati, and Tumbel. There are a total of 23 main clans, termed as visotar (20+3), each of which has multiple sub-clans and lineages.

1. Āsaṇiā
2. Avasurā
3. Bhāṃcaḷiā
4. Bāṭī
5. Chorāḍā
6. Chuṃvā
7. Guḍhāyacha
8. Gāṃgaṇiā
9. Jākhaḷā
10. Kesariā
11. Lādīta
12. Mhādā
13. Mārū
14. Mīsaṇa
15. Naiyā
16. Narā
17. Phunaḍā
18. Ratanūṃ
19. Rohaḍiā
20. Tuṃbela
21. Vāchā
22. Ṭhākarīā
23. Ṭāpariā

== History ==
=== Etymology ===
The word chāraṇa is believed to originate from the Sanskrit root cāra signifying 'motion'. This derivation relates to the Charanas as being the literary persons, as poets and agents of devotion (bhakti) to the gods. As a root, cara may also imply their pastoral adaptation. As such, chāraṇa has been used to denote 'wanderer', 'eulogist of the gods', 'offspring of the goddess', etc. The meanings attributed to the name chāraṇa also reflect the various identities ascribed to the Charanas.

=== Mythological Origins ===
The Charana beliefs of origin vary in details but are similar in major aspects on being a ganas of Shiva. The ancestor of the Charanas is represented as the creation of Shiva and Shakti (sometimes Sati, Parvati) to shepherd the celestial bull, Nandi. According to an origin legend, Shiva created the Charana who had to tend to four animals of incompatible kinds, namely a lion, a serpent, a cow and a goat. The lion attacked the cow and the serpent attacked the lion, but the Charana sacrificed flesh of his arm to pacify them and was thus able to keep them all safe. The legend is understood allegorically, with the lion representing violence and Nandi, the bull of Shiva, symbolizing justice. So the Charana, being the guardian, will not allow force to triumph over justice.

As a progression of the legend, the Charana marries the Nāga maiden, Āvaḍ (or Āveri), the daughter of Śeṣa Nāga, the chief of the Nāgas. From her, he gets two sons and a daughter. So, the divine Charanas are married to Nāga maidens, and Narā, either son or descendent of the first Charana descends to earth to become ancestor of the mortal Charanas.

Other major narratives allude to their historical function as royal poets and historians. The Charanas were originally divine beings ranking with the Gandharvas and Vidyadharas. In time, like certain other divine classes, the Charanas settled on earth, and became the bards of kings. Multiple accounts describe the Charanas' transformation from celestial to human beings. These accounts concur that the divine predecessors of the Charanas resided in the Sumeru mountains alongside celestial beings. Due to overpopulation, the Charanas relocated to Earth, establishing their initial human abode in the Himalayas.

Renowned 19th-century scholar, Suryamall in his text of history, Vaṃśa Bhāskara, details another narrative in which Āryamitra, last of the Sūtas and descendent of sage Lomaharshana, does a penance in Himalayas to please Lord Shiva and is rewarded by the epithet of the 'Chāraṇa' after he shepherds the celestial bull, Nandi. As a boon, Lord Shiva marries him with the Nāga maiden, Āvaḍ (Āvari), daughter of Vāsuki.

The maternal ancestry of the Charanas from the Nāgas also factored into historical relationships with other communities. In regions of Gujarat, Charanas traditionally referred to the persons of Rajput, Ahir and Kathi communities as māmā (MoBr) and were in-turn called as bhāṇej (SiSo). This was ascribed to the Charana belief of these communities emerging from the Nāgas, i.e., the Ahirs are said to be descended from Ahi-nāga and Kathis from Karkotaka.

As illustrated by the various narratives, the Charanas placed exalted importance on themselves and their origin.

=== Emergence in Rajput polity ===
Charanas played a crucial role in Rajput society, occupying a position equivalent to Brahmins. As the Rajputs emerged as principal rulers of the region, they needed a value system and moral guidance that aligned with their warrior lifestyle. Charanas fulfilled this role, serving as historians, literary figures, and genealogists. They composed prose and poetry, including the famous khyātas and batās. Charanas enjoyed the freedom to express themselves and were considered immune from punishment, even when criticizing rulers. Considered avadhya, to harm or kill a Charan was considered a sin. They validated the ancestry of Rajput rulers and connected them with legendary Indian rulers of Hindu mythology, legitimizing their authority. In return for their services, Charanas received sasan or rent-free jagirs.

The emergence of Charanas as a distinct caste mirrored the change in society, where Brahmins took a back seat. Rajputs, being a military people, required a different value system and religious practices and a 'new class of pandits' to legitimize their military actions and to encourage and inspire them for such activities. The conventional notions of salvation were replaced by the pursuit of a heroic death on the battlefield. The Rajputs did not adhere to Brahminical norms, astrology, or literature, seeking a different type of education for their progeny.

As the Rajputs formed a caste, they needed a caste to fulfill the roles Brahmins played under the Kshatriyas. Charanas took on these functions, developing a code of conduct known as rajputī or 'Rajput Dharma'. They were teachers, exponents of religion, and moral guides for the ruling class. Their teachings were captured in the verses of Charan literature, emphasizing principles such as valor, loyalty, warfare, and charity.

In contemporary polity, Charanas held precedence over all other castes inclusive of the Brahmin in the customary law of the land. They were invited to the residences of Rajput chiefs and played a vital role in educating the younger generation about heroic values and traditions. Charanas were honored with high positions in the court, and the chief offered them the first palm of opium as a mark of respect. Rajputs prioritized castes that accompanied them in battle, and Charanas fulfilled this role, fighting alongside and making sacrifices.

In conclusion, Charanas became the upholders of rajputi or rajput code of conduct, occupying a position in Rajput society similar to that of Brahmins under the Kshatriyas. Their importance and influence were rooted in their pivotal role in shaping the values, educating the youth, and supporting the military and political system of the Rajputs.

== Culture and ethos ==
Charans mainly worship various forms of Shakti and incarnations of Hinglaj. They greet one another with 'Jai Mataji Ki' (Victory to the Mother Goddess). The women observed social customs such as purdah (women seclusion) and widow remarriage was forbidden. Before Indian independence in 1947, a sacrifice of a male buffalo constituted a major part of the celebration of Navratri. Such celebrations quite often used to be presided over by Charan women.

=== Patronized groups ===
There are seven categories of people who are historically patronized by the Charans:—

1. Kulguru Brahmins: The kulguru Brahmins of the Charans come from Ujjain and travel from village to village and register the names of their hosts after receiving donations.
2. Purohits: Brahmins of various castes (Gurjar Gaur, Dahima, Audichya, Sanadhya, Rajguru etc) serve as priests who also tie rakhi (rakshasutra) to the Charans.
3. Rawals: The Rawal Brahmins record their genealogy and also present various swang (forms of dance).
4. Motisars: Motisars compose poems in honor of Charans.
5. Bhats (Ravaji): They are professional genealogists of the Charans. They also receive neg (gifts) on marriages. The genealogists of both the Charans and the Rathores of Marwar are from the 'Chandisa' sept of Bhats.
6. 3 types of Dholis:
  1. Dhola
  2. Birampota
  3. Goyandpota
7. Manganiyars: Hereditary professional folk-musicians.

==== Opium usage ====
Charans used to enjoy consumption of opium (also known as Afeem or Amal in regional languages), practices which are also popular among the Rajputs of this region. The usage of opium by Charans was considered necessary for important ceremonies & social gatherings. At weddings, the bride and the bridegroom would take opium together in the presence of their kinsmen. Other occasions where it was suitable to take opium were betrothals, weddings, the birth of a male child, parting of the beard, reconciliations, at visit of a son-in law, after a death, and on festivals such as 'Akhatij'. In Saurashtra, during British rule, it was found that around a half of the total opium consumers were from Charan and Rajput communities.

== Contributions to Indian literature ==
A whole genre of literature is known as Charan literature. The Dingal language and literature exist largely due to this caste. Zaverchand Meghani divides Charani sahitya (literature) into thirteen subgenres:

- Songs in praise of gods and goddesses (stavan)
- Songs in praise of heroes, saints and patrons (birdavalo)
- Descriptions of war (varanno)
- Rebukes of wavering great kings and men who use their power for evil (upalambho)
- Mockery of a standing treachery of heroism (thekadi)
- Love stories
- Laments for dead warriors, patrons and friends (marasiya or vilap kavya)
- Praise of natural beauty, seasonal beauty and festivals
- Descriptions of weapons
- Songs in praise of lions, horses, camels, and buffalo
- Sayings about didactic and practical cleverness
- Ancient epics
- Songs describing the anguish of people in times of famine and adversity

Other classifications of Charani sahitya are Khyatas (chronicles), Vartas and Vatas (stories), Raso (martial epics), Veli - Veli Krishan Rukman ri, Doha-Chhand (verses).

== See also ==
- List of Charans
- Gadhavi
- Barhath
- Kaviraja

== Bibliography ==
- Kamphorst, Janet (2008). In Praise of Death: History and Poetry in Medieval Marwar. Leiden University Press. ISBN 978-90-8728-044-4.
- Kothiyal, Tanuja (2016). Nomadic Narratives: A History of Mobility and Identity in the Great Indian Desert (illustrated, reprint ed.). Delhi, India: Cambridge University Press. ISBN 978-1107080317. LCCN 2015014741. OCLC 1003137945.
