= List of people from Rajasthan =

This is a list of notable people from Rajasthan, a state in India. The criteria of this list includes those who were born in the state of Rajasthan and that part of the former Rajputana that now is part of the modern state of Rajasthan.

== Award winners from Rajasthan ==
- Padma Vibhushan
  - Naresh Chandra, 2007
  - Ram Narayan, 2005
  - Man Mohan Sharma, 2001
  - Kalu Lal Shrimali, 1976
  - Nagendra Singh, 1973
  - Daulat Singh Kothari, 1973
  - Mohan Sinha Mehta, 1969
  - Manikya Lal Varma, 1965
  - Ghanshyam Das Birla, 1957
- Padma Bhushan
  - Komal Kothari, 2006
  - Jasdev Singh, 2008
  - Vijay Shankar Vyas, 2006
  - Durga Lal, 2003
  - Jagat Singh Mehta, 2002
  - Ram Narain Agarwal, 2000
  - L. M. Singhvi, 1998
  - Narayan Singh Manaklao, 1991
  - M.V.Mathur, 1989
  - Natwar Singh, 1984
  - Jhabar Mal Sharma, 1982
  - Bhogilal Pandya, 1976
  - Ratan Shastri, 1975
  - Narayandas Malkani, 1973
  - Lt Gen Sagat Singh, 1972
  - Gokulbhai Bhatt, 1971
  - Prabhu Lal Bhatnagar, 1968
  - Manikya Lal Varma, 1965
  - Daulat Singh Kothari, 1962
  - Rao Raja Hanut Singh, 1958
- Padma Shri
  - Lakha Khan, 2021
  - Jasdev Singh, 1985
  - Chandra Prakash Deval, 2011
  - Krishna Poonia, 2011
  - Arjun Prajapati, 2010
  - Vijaydan Detha, 2007
  - Rajyavardhan Singh Rathore, 2005
  - Veer Singh Mehta, 2005
  - Kanhaiyalal Sethia, 2004
  - Vishwa Mohan Bhatt, 2002
  - Mohammed Tayab Khan, craftmanship, 2001
  - Vaidya Suresh Chaturvedi, 2000
  - Kailash Sankhala, The Tiger Man Of India, 1992
  - Sriram Singh Shekhawat, in 1992
  - Kudrat Singh, 1988
  - Hisam-ud-din Usta, 1986, arts
  - Mag Raj Jain, 1989, social work
  - Lashmi Kumari Chundawat, 1984
  - Purushottam Das, 1984, Arts
  - Ram Gopal Vijayvargiya, 1984, painting
  - Dafadar Raghubir Singh (Equestrian), 1983
  - Allah Jilai Bai, 1982
  - Shree Lal Joshi
  - Raghubir Singh, 1983
  - P. K . Sethi
  - Sita Ram Lalas, 1977, literature
  - Kripal Singh Shekhawat, 1974
  - Vijay Singh, 1972, civil service
  - Khailshanker Durlabhji, 1971, trade and industry
  - Yudhvir Singh, 1971, social work
  - Ratna Fabri, 1970, arts
  - Devi Lal Samar, 1968, arts
  - Sis Ram Ola, for social work in 1968
  - Kanwar Sain, 1956
  - Ratan Shastri, 1955
  - Sudhir Tailang
- Magsaysay Award
  - Rajendra Singh
  - P. K . Sethi
- Lalit Kala Akademi Fellowship
  - Ram Gopal Vijayvargiya
- Rashtrapati Award
  - Kala Nath Shastry, 1998

== Gallantry honors ==
————————————————

=== Param Vir Chakra ===
- CHM Piru Singh Shekhawat (Jhunjhunu)
- Major Shaitan Singh Bhati of Banasar (Jodhpur) (13th Kumaon)

=== Maha Vir Chakra ===
- Brigadier Sawai Maharaja Bhawani Singh of Jaipur (9th Parachute, Special Forces) (President's Bodyguards)
- Colonel Thakur Kishan Singh Rathore of Ghadsisar (Bikaner) (1st Rajput)
- Naik Digendra Kumar SM from Neem Ka Thana (Sikar) (2nd Rajput)
- Lt. Genenral Thakur Hanut Singh PVSM of Jasol (17 Poona Horse)

=== Ashoka Chakra ===
- Defedar Sultan Singh Rathore (Mamdola-Didwana)
- 2nd Lt. Puneet Nath Dutt, Jaipur

=== Kirti Chakra ===
- Captain Karni Singh Rathore (Later on Promoted to Colonel) Lakhau, Churu
- Havaldar Amar Singh Rathore (Ramdawas, Jodhpur)]
- Colonel Saurabh Singh Shekhawat (21 Para Commando, Special Forces)

=== Shaurya Chakra ===
- Colonel Saurabh Singh Shekhawat, 21 Para Commando (Special Forces) - Village: Dhani Daulat Singh, Alwar

=== Vir Chakra ===
- Squadron Leader Ajay Ahuja
- Naib Sub. Rampal Singh (Kotputli Jaipur), 9 Rajput, 1999

=== Sena Medal ===
- Colonel Saurabh Singh Shekhawat (21 Para Commando, Special Forces)
- Major Bhanu Pratap Singh (8 Rajputana Rifles / 43 Rashtriya Rifles)
- Colonel Digvijay Singh Bhati (6th Rajput)

=== Vishisht Seva Medal ===
- Major Surendra Poonia (Rajpura, Sikar)-Special Forces, President's Bodyguard, AMC, World Medical Games
- Colonel Saurabh Singh Shekhawat (21 Para Commando, Special Forces)

== Business and Industry ==
- Ajay Piramal
- Ghanshyam Das Birla
- Lakshmi Mittal
- Jamnalal Bajaj
- H S Ranka
- Chanda Kochhar
- Harakh Chand Nahata
- Motilal Oswal of Motilal Oswal securities
- Desh Bandhu Gupta of Lupin Laboratories
- Sankaet Pathak of Synapse Financial Technologies and Foundation robotics
- Rahul Yadav (born 1989) is an Indian entrepreneur best known for being the co-founder and former CEO of Indian real estate search portal Housing.com.
- Radhakishan Damani, is the founder and chairman of retail chain DMart. Damani is referred to as the "retail king" of India.

== Defence ==
- Abhey Singh
- Lt. Gen. K. Bhadur Singh (retd.)
- Lt Gen (Retd) Ajai Singh, PVSM, A VSM
- Lt Gen Sagat Singh from (Village Moda), Churu district the hero of 1971 Bangladesh War
- Lt. General Nathu Singh Rathore (Gumanpura, Dungarpur) - 1st Lt. General of Indian Army
- Colonel Saurabh Singh Shekhawat KC, SC, VSM, SM (21 Para Special Forces) Village: Dhani Daulat Singh, Alwar

== Judiciary and law ==
=== Chief Justice of Supreme Court of India ===
- Rajendra Mal Lodha, Chief Justice of India

=== Chief Justice of Rajasthan High Court ===
- Daulat Mal Bhandari
- Chand Mal Lodha

=== Chief Justice of Other High Courts ===
- Mohan Lall Shrimal
- Guman Mal Lodha
- Dalveer Bhandari

=== Judges of Rajasthan High Court ===
- Kan Singh Parihar
- Milap Chand Jain
- Rajendra Mal Lodha

=== Jurists ===
- L. M. Singhvi
- Dalveer Bhandari

== Eminent scholars ==
=== Scientists ===
- Brahmagupta
- Daulat Singh Kothari
- Rajendra Singh Paroda
- Rajpal Singh Yadav, Vector ecologist
- Laxman Singh Rathore, DG Meteorology
- DP Sharma, Computer and IT scientist
- Govardhan Mehta, Chemical scientist
- PK Sethi, Medical orthopedics

=== Medicine ===
- P. K. Sethi
- Veer Singh Mehta
- Hakim Syed Karam Husain, Unani practitioner
- Tirath Das Dogra, Former Director AIIMS, Vice Chancellor SGT University, Gurgaon.

== Historical figures ==
- Meerabai
- Panna Dhai
- Gora and Badal
- Hada Rani
- Bhamashah
- Rao Bika
- Rani Padmini
- Narharidas Barhath
- Adho Duraso OR Arha Dursa, Panchetiya, Pali
- Kaviraja Bankidas Ashiya
- Suryamal Misran
- Kaviraja Shyamaldas

== Journalism ==
- Karpoor Chand Kulish, founder of Rajasthan Patrika
- Ved Pratap Vaidik
- Pratap Bhanu Mehta

== Administration ==
- D.R. Mehta, ex chairman of SEBI,
- Gyan Prakash Pilania
- Kunwar Natwar Singh

== Literature ==
- Dursa Arha
- Kaviraja Bankidas Ashiya
- Narharidas Barhath
- Suryamal Misran
- Magha (poet)
- Sunderdas
- Lashmi Kumari Chundawat
- Kanhaiyalal Sethia
- Nand Kishore Acharya
- Acharya Rajendrasuri
- Abdul Vaheed `Kamal'
- Vijaydan Detha
- Bhatt Mathuranath Shastri (Sanskrit poet)
- Kala Nath Shastry (Sanskrit scholar)
- Hemant Shesh (Hindi poet)
- Mandan Mishra (Sanskrit scholar)
- Shyamaldas
- Vidyadhar Shastri
- Thakur Akshay Singh Ratnu
- Chandra Prakash Deval
- Rawat Saraswat (Rajasthani poet)

== Arts ==
- Suvigya Sharma
- Reshma
- Gulabo (Kalbelia dancer)

=== Music ===
- Ahmed and Mohammed Hussain
- Allah Jilai Bai
- Aminuddin Dagar
- Raj Kamal
- Ananya Birla
- Brij Bhushan Kabra
- Chatur Lal
- Ila Arun
- Jagjit Singh
- Mehdi Hassan
- Moinuddin Khan, sarangi player
- Nasir Moinuddin Dagar, Dhrupad vocalist
- Raja Hasan
- Sandeep Acharya
- Shreya Ghoshal
- Shail Hada
- Toshi Sabri
- Vishwa Mohan Bhatt
- Wasifuddin Dagar
- Zia Fariddudin Dagar
- Zia Mohiuddin Dagar
- Khemchand Prakash
- Brij Lal Verma
- Sultan Khan (Sarangi player and classical vocalist)
- Roop Kumar Rathod (Singer)
- Shravan Kumar (music composer-Nadeem Shravan)
- Bhanu Pratap Singh
- Malini Rajurkar
- Krishna Bhatt

=== Dance ===
- Puran Bhatt
- Manisha Gulyani

=== Painting ===
- B. G. Sharma
- Shree Lal Joshi
- Archibald Herman Muller

== Art craft and handicrafts ==
- Kripal Singh Shekhawat, blue pottery
- Badri Lal Chitrakar, Shilp Guru award
- Mohanlal Chaturbhuj Kumhar
- Vibhor Sogani, public artist noted for "Sprouts"
- Usha Rani Hooja
- Jagdish Lal Raj Soni
- Beni Ram Soni

== Film industry ==
- Arjun Deo Charan
- Bharat Vyas
- Tarachand Barjatya (producer)
- Mani Kaul (director)
- Hasrat Jaipuri
- Jagjit Singh (singer)
- Irrfan Khan
- Karmveer Choudhary
- Kirti Kulhari
- Asrani (actor)
- Mahipal
- K. C. Bokadia
- Sultan Khan (singer)
- Kovid Gupta (screenwriter, filmmaker)
- Smita Bansal (Balika Vadhu Fame)
- Sakshi Tanwar
- Ashish Sharma
- Ankit Bhardwaj
- Aasif Khan

== Others ==
- Raj Singh Dungarpur
- Hanuman Prasad Poddar
- Chanda Kochhar
- Bhanwari Devi, social worker
- Falahari Baba
- Sanjay Puri (architect), architect
- Nandini Gupta, beauty pageant titleholder

== Independence activists ==
- Ram Narayan Chaudhary
- Nathuram Mirdha
- Parsaram Maderna
- Ranmal Singh Dorwal
- Thakur Kesari Singh Barhath
- Kunwar Pratap Singh Barhath
- Thakur Zorawar Singh Barhath
- Rao Gopal Singh Kharwa
- Lothoo Nitharwal
- Sagarmal Gopa
- Bharat Pratap Singh
- Daulat Mal Bhandari
- Swami Keshwanand
- Har Lal Singh
- Vijay Singh Pathik
- Rao Tula Ram

== Religion ==
- Karni Mata
- Guru Jambheshwar
- Devnarayan
- Baba Ramdevji
- Bavaliya Baba
- Mata Rani BhatiyaniJasol
- Gogaji
- Pabuji
- Mahatma Isardas
- Jambhoji
- Dadu Dayal
- Brahmanand Swami
- Dhanna Bhagat
- Karmabai
- Mirabai
- Tejaji
- Acharya Rajendrasuri
- Acharya Mahaprajna
- Khetlaji
- Swarupadas
- Keshavrai

== Rulers ==
- Badan Singh, founder and first Maharaja of Bharatpur
- Suraj Mal, Maharaja of Bharatpur
- Maharawal Jaisal Singh, Founder of Jaisalmer
- Jawahar Singh, Maharaja of Bharatpur
- Ranjit Singh, Maharaja of Bharatpur
- Jaswant Singh, Maharaja of Bharatpur
- Rao Lunkaran Singh, Maharaja of Bikaner
- Ram Singh, Maharaja of Bharatpur
- Kishan Singh, Maharaja of Bharatpur
- Brijendra Singh, last ruling Maharaja of Bharatpur
- Rao Siha, Founder of Marwar
- Kirat Singh, founder and first Maharana of Dholpur
- Amar Singh Rathore, king of Nagaur
- Bappa Rawal, king of Mewar
- Durga Das Rathore
- General Maharaja Sir Ganga Singh, king of Bikaner
- Hammiradeva of Ranthambore- grandson of Prithvi Raj Chauhan
- Maharaja Anup Singh, King of Bikaner
- Hammir Singh, king of Mewar
- Jai Singh I, king of Jaipur
- Raja Karan Singh, King of Bikaner
- Jai Singh II, king of Jaipur
- Jaswant Singh, king of Jodhpur
- Kanhadadeva, king of Jalore
- Maharao Shardul Singh
- Maharana Pratap, king of Mewar
- Man Singh I, king of Jaipur
- Prithvi Raj Chauhan, king Ajmer
- Raja Nahar Khan, king of Mewat
- Rana Kumbha, king Mewar
- Rana Sanga, king of Mewar
- Rao Jodha, Founder of Jodhpur
- Rao Bika, Founder of Bikaner
- Rawal Mallinath
- Rao Shekhaji
- Udai Singh II, king of Mewar
- Raja Rai Singh, King of Bikaner
- Vigraharaja IV, King of Shakambhari
- Viramadeva, king of Jalore

== Politics ==
=== Rajya Sabha members ===
- List of Rajya Sabha members from Rajasthan

=== Ministers —Rajasthan Government ===
- List of ministers in Government of Rajasthan

=== Vice President of India ===
- Jagdeep Dhankar
- Bhairon Singh Shekhawat

=== Governors of other states ===
- Gulab Chand Kataria
- Hari Dev Joshi
- Mohan Lal Sukhadia
- Mohammed Usman Arif
- Sadiq Ali
- Nawal Kishore Sharma
- Sunder Singh Bhandari
- Kanwar Bahadur Singh
- Rajkumar Dhoot
- Ajai Singh
- Arvind Dave
- Banwari Lal Joshi
- Shiv Charan Mathur
- Govind Singh Gurjar
- Jagannath Pahadia
- Kamla Beniwal

=== Chief ministers ===
- Hiralal Shastri
- Jai Narayan Vyas
- Mohan Lal Sukhadia
- Barkatullah Khan
- Hari Dev Joshi
- Jagannath Pahadia
- Hira Lal Devpura
- Shiv Charan Mathur
- Ashok Gehlot
- Tika Ram Paliwal
- Bhairon Singh Shekhawat
- Bhajan Lal Sharma
- Vasundhara Raje

=== Ministers — central government ===
- Jaswant Singh, Former External Affairs, Defense & Finance Minister of India
- Kalyan Singh Kalvi, Energy Minister of India.
- Natwar Singh, Former External Affairs Minister of India
- Nathuram Mirdha
- Subhash Maharia
- Satish Chandra Agrawal
- Krishana Kumar Goyal
- Girija Vyas
- Rajesh Pilot
- Ram Niwas Mirdha
- Sis Ram Ola
- Nawal Kishore Sharma
- Mohammed Usman Arif
- Gajendra Singh Shekhawat
- Arjun Ram Meghwal
- Rajyavardhan Singh Rathore
- Bhupender Yadav
- Kailash Meghwal
- Jaskaur Meena
- Kalu Lal Shrimali
- Raj Bahadur
- Sachin Pilot, Minister of State in the Ministry of Communications and Technology
- Namo Narain Meena, Minister of State in the Ministry of Finance
- Kirori Lal Meena
- C.P. Joshi
- Sanwar Lal Jat

=== Speakers of Rajasthan Legislative Assembly ===
- Sumitra Singh, first women speaker of the Rajasthan Legislative Assembly
- Poonam Chand Vishnoi
- Parasram Maderna
- Hari Shankar Bhabhra
- Shanti Lal Chaplot
- Laxman Singh
- Kailash Chandra Meghwal

=== Others ===
- Gayatri Devi
- Rawal Umed Singh Rathore Barmer
- Mohar Singh Rathore
- Jawan Singh
- Daulat Mal Bhandari
- Chaudhari Kumbharam Arya
- Narendra Budania
- Motilal Vora Ex chief minister of Madhya Pradesh
- Devi Singh Bhati
- Mamta Sharma
- Bhawani Singh of Pokhran (b. 1911) member 1st Lok Sabha

== Award Winning Sports People ==
=== Khel Ratna Award Winners ===
- Rajyavardhan Singh Rathore

=== Arjuna Award Winners ===
Basketball

- Khushi Ram, in 1967
- Hanuman Singh, in 1975
- Radhey Shyam, in 1981
- Ajmer Singh, in 1982

Athletics

- Sriram Singh, in 1973
- Gopal Saini, in 1981
- Raj Kumar (athlete), in 1984
- Deena Ram, in 1990

Football

• Rajvi Magan Singh RPS of Dhingsari

Volleyball

- R K Purohit, in 1983
- Suresh Mishra, in 1979

Hockey

- Sunita Puri, in 1966
- Varsha Soni, in 1981

Archery

- Shyam Lal Meena, in 1989
- Limba Ram, in 1991

Cricket

- Salim Durani, in 1961
- Pankaj Singh, in 2007 – present

Swimming

- Manjari Bhargava, in 1974

=== Weightlifting ===
- Mehar Chand Bhaskar, in 1985

=== Squash ===
- Bhuvneshwari Kumari, in 1982

=== Shooting ===
- Colonel Dr Maharaja Karni Singh of Bikaner, in 1961
- Rajyashree Kumari of Bikaner, in 1968
- Bhuvaneshwari Kumari of Kota, in 1969
- Bhim Singh II of Kota, in 1971
- Rajyavardhan Singh Rathore, in 2003

=== Polo ===
- Col. Maharaj Prem Singh, in 1961
- Lt.Col Kishan Singh, in 1963
- Rao Raja Hanut Singh, in 1964

=== Equestrian ===
- Dafadar Raghubir Singh (Equestrian), in 1982
- Col.G. M. Khan, VSM (Equestrian), in 1984

=== Golf ===
- Lakshman Singh, in 1982

=== Paralympics ===
- Devendra Jhajharia
- Avani Lekhara
- Krishna Nagar
- Kumar Nitesh

=== Others ===
- Parthasarathy Sharma, Cricket
- Hanumant Singh, Cricket
- Vikram Solanki, Cricket
- Gajendra Singh Shaktawat, Cricket
- Gangotri Bhandari, Ladies hockey
- Abhijeet Gupta, Chess
- Krishna Poonia
- Bajranglal Takhar
- Hari Singh (athlete), marathon runner
- Surendra Poonia, Power-lifting

=== Dronacharya award winners ===
- Guru Hanuman, for wrestling
- Maha Singh Rao, for wrestling in 2006
- R. D. Singh, for Athletics in 2007

== List of members of the Constituent Assembly from Rajasthan as at 14 November 1949 ==
- V.T. Krishnamachari
- Heera Lal Shastri
- Raj Bahadur
- Manikya Lal Varma
- Lt. Col. Apji Dalel Singh
- Jai Narayan Vyas
- Mukat Behari Lal Bhargava
- Gokulbhai Bhatt

== Sports / Athletes ==
Cricket

- Salman Khan
- Mahipal Lomror
- Vinoo Mankad
- Syed Mushtaq Ali
- Kamlesh Nagarkoti
- B. B. Nimbalkar
- Rahul Chahar
- Deepak Chahar
- Ravi Bishnoi
- Khaleel Ahmed

== See also ==
- List of people by India state
