= Veerendra Raj Mehta =

Indian social worker

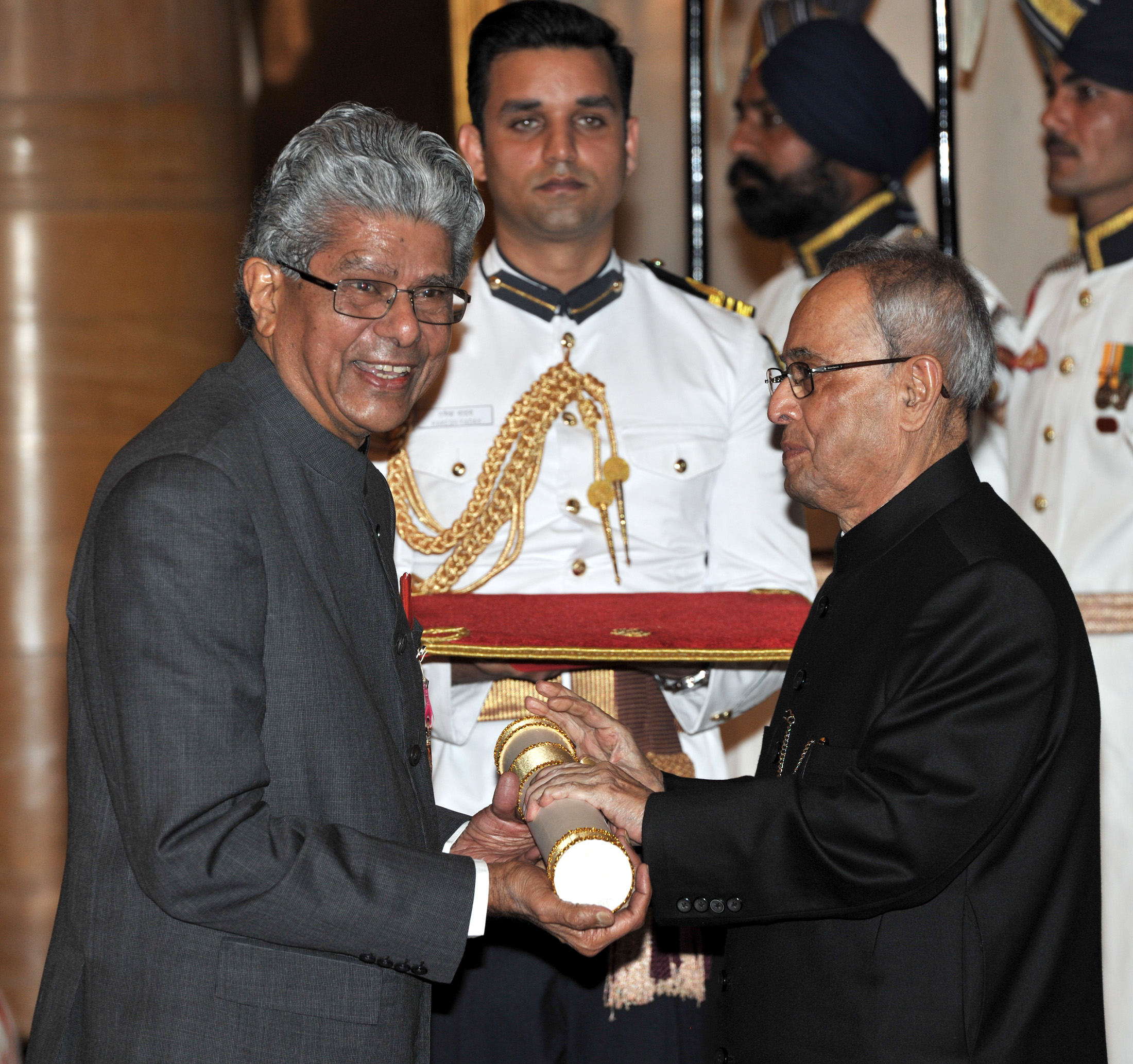
- President Pranab Mukherjee (right) presenting the Padma Shri Award to Mehta (left) in New Delhi on April 08, 2015
- Born: Jodhpur, India
- Died: 2023; Delhi
- Occupation: Social worker
- Known for: Jaipur foot
- Spouse: Vimla Mehta (Deceased)
- Children: Prof Shailendra Raj Mehta & Atty Sandhya Mehta
- Awards: Padma Shri

Veerendra Raj Mehta was an Indian social worker, a former Joint Secretary to the Government of India, a trustee of Sir Dorabji Tata Trust and a former Senior Specialist of the Asian Development Bank in Manila, Philippines and a Consultant at the World Bank and the African Development Bank. He was the elder brother of Devendra Raj Mehta, a 2008 winner of Padma Bhushan and the founder of Bhagwan Mahaveer Viklang Sahayata Samiti (BMVSS), Jaipur, the makers of renowned Jaipur foot, where Veerendra Raj Mehta was also an honorary executive President.

Mehta was credited with taking Jaipur Foot beyond the Indian boundaries, founded the Mahaveer Philippines Foundation Inc. (MPFI) and has established three centres of the prosthetic makers in Philippines. He has been honoured by the Philippines House of Representatives in 2010 and has been presented with the key to the city of Manila in 1993. He was honoured by the Government of India in 2015 with Padma Shri, the fourth highest Indian civilian award.––He has co-authored a book titled "Mother Teresa - Inspiring Incidents" with his wife Vimla Mehta, based on their close association of 15 years with Mother Teresa and her work in Manila, Philippines.

== See also ==
- Jaipur foot
- Sir Dorabji Tata Trust
- Asian Development Bank
- Devendra Raj Mehta
