= Ranka =

Ranka may refer to:

- Ranka (surname), a surname belonging to the Oswal community of Rajasthan, India
- Ranka (grape), another name for the wine grape Chasselas
  - Luglienga, another wine and table grape that is also known as Ranka
- Ranka (legend), a Chinese legend, also known as Rotten Axe Handle
- The strategy game of Go
- Ranka Lee, a character in the Japanese anime Macross Frontier
- Lingdum Monastery (also Ranka Monastery) at Ranka, in Sikkim, India
- Ranka Velimirović, film producer
- Ranka Kagurazaka, a character in Valkyrie Drive- Bhikkhuni
- Arpit Ranka, Indian actor
- H S Ranka, Indian industrialist
- Ranka Ōkami, a character from the Japanese anime and manga Seton Academy: Join the Pack!
