= Vaheed =

Vaheed is a surname. Notable people with the surname include:

- Abdul Vaheed "Kamal" (born 1983), American footballer
- M. A. Vaheed (born 1950), Indian politician
