= Suvigya Sharma =

Indian artist, painter, fashion designer (born 1983)

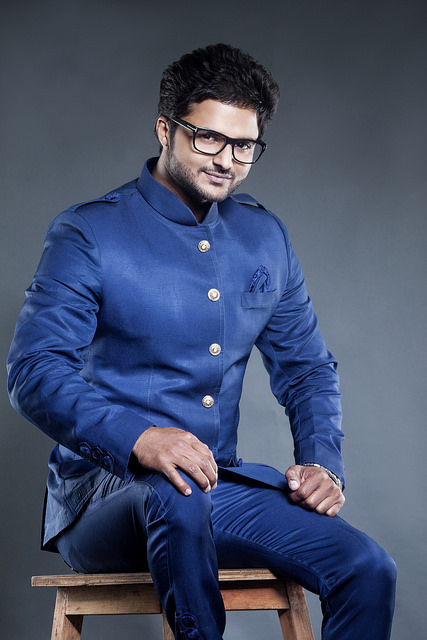
- Suvigya Sharma in 2015
- Born: 28 July 1983 (age 43); Jaipur, Rajasthan, India
- Education: Maharaja Sawai Mansingh School; Bharatiya Vidya Bhavan's Vidyashram, Jaipur; Bhawanipur Education Society College; Symbiosis International University
- Known for: Painting, Drawing, Fashion Designing
- Notable work: 4D Siddhivinayak Painting; 3D Pichwai painting of Shrinathji; Restoration of SAM
- Spouse: Charu Sharma
- Children: Abhigya
- Website: www.suvigyasharma.com

Suvigya Sharma (born 28 July 1983) is an Indian artist, painter, fashion designer, who does portrait miniatures and other miniature art, Tanjore painting, fresco work and portraits. He has worked in restoring frescoes at the City Palace, Jaipur, the jama masjid (congregational mosque) and the Singapore Art Museum.

In February, 2016, Suvigya Sharma his art work Timeless Miniature Art was showcased at Make in India event, with a live demonstration of miniature-painting techniques in Mumbai.

== Early life and education ==
Suvigya Sharma was born on 28 July 1983 in Jaipur of Indian state Rajasthan to R.K. Sharma, an artist. He did his schooling from Maharaja Sawai Mansingh School and Bharatiya Vidya Bhavan's Vidyashram. Later he graduated from Bhawanipur Education Society College, Kolkata. He also studied Foreign Trade & Export Management from Symbiosis International University, Pune. He started painting at the age of seven. He used to teach dance way back when he was a teenager, said in an interview with DNA.

== Career ==
Suvigya has worked on fresco in Jaipur and other places like Havelis in Udaipur and Kishangarh, [jama masjid (congregational mosque)'s gold leafing, a few section of Jaipur City Palace, Bungalows, Dargah, heritage properties in different part of India.

Some of his clients for whom he painted, includes L. N. Mittal, Sachin Tendulkar, Narendra Modi, Priyanka Chopra, Aditya Chopra, Rani Mukherji Sanjay Dutt, Manyata Dutt, Kangana Ranaut B. S. Yediyurappa, Virat Kohli, Justin Bieber and business families such as the Ambanis, the Birlas, the Burmans, the Singhanias, the Piramal, the Bajaj. Suvigya has also painted for PM Narendra Modi, Barack Obama, Hillary Clinton and Dalai Lama.

Sharma's works have been unveiled by figures such as film actress Kangana Ranaut, Madhoo, Rani Mukherji chef Vikas Khanna and cricketer Sachin Tendulkar. Several of Sharma's artworks incorporate 24 carat gold.

He has been exhibited in galleries and museums such as Academy of Fine Arts, Kolkata, Cymroza Art Gallery, Kamalnayan Bajaj Art Gallery, Chitrakoot Art Gallery, India Habitat Centre, Artisans Art Gallery He designed the cover page of chef Vikas Khanna's cookbook Utsav, which had its worth ₹35 Lakh ($51,590.00)., Gallery Navrathan and Vasantha Art Gallery.

On 4 October 2016, Suvigya gifted Sachin Tendulkar with a handmade memento -a custom-made gold-leaved and gold-embossed bat with a 24 carat gold handle at the opening of his show The Art of Royals, reportedly by Times of India.

On 10 May 2017, during The Purpose Tour concert in India, Suvigya Sharma commissioned a life-size oil on canvas portrait for Justin Bieber and presented it to him at St. Regis in Lower Parel, Mumbai. In May, 2017, he commissioned a lifelike portrait for prime minister Narendra Modi.

In 2021, Suvigya created a series of Non-Fungible Tokens (NFTs) featuring artworks focusing on wildlife. The collection includes depictions of the near-extinct polar bear and rhinoceros placed against highly detailed hyper-realistic 3D backgrounds.

=== Collaboration with Make in India ===
In February 2016, Sharma, was invited to showcase his work for Government of India's initiative Make in India, followed by a live demonstration of Miniature-painting technologies by him.

== Charity ==
In June 2016, Suvigya Sharma participated along with artists Uddhav Thackeray, Ajay De, Sudharak Olwe, Brinda Miller, Rajiv Menon in fund raiser art-exhibition for Nargis Dutt Cancer Foundation in Mumbai, which was organized by Priya Dutt.

== Exhibitions ==
Year	Event's name	Venue
2021	Enticing Pichwais	Kamalnayan Bajaj Art Gallery
2018	Illuminations	Kamalnayan Bajaj Art Gallery
2018	Reminiscence	Kamalnayan Bajaj Art Gallery
2016	The Art of Royals	Kamalnayan Bajaj Art Gallery
2016	Timeless Miniature Art	ArtDesh Gallery
2015	Forever Eternal 'Pichwai	Kamalnayan Bajaj Art Gallery, Nariman Point
2014	An Art Collectors Paradise	Cymroza Art Gallery, Breach Candy
2013	Illuminations	Kala Ghoda Arts Festival, Mumbai
2010	The Golden Era	Breach Candy
2009	Mythologies of India	Cymroza Art gallery, Mumbai
2007–2009	Open Palm Court	Chennai Art gallery & India Habitat Centre, Delhi
2007–2009	The Art of India	Chennai Art gallery & India Habitat Centre, Delhi

== Personal life ==
Suvigya's wife name is Charu, and the couple has a son named Abhigya.

== Recognition ==
In January, 2017, he was appointed as the Goodwill Ambassador of Rajasthan by Smile Foundation.

In September 2021, the International Delphic Council appointed Sharma as an Honorary Member of the Advisory Board Maharashtra with the aim of promoting art and culture. In 2023, he was inducted into the list of 'Prominent Rajasthanis' by the Government of Rajasthan.

== See also ==
- List of Indian artists
- List of people from Rajasthan
