= Jaipur foot =

Prosthetic limb

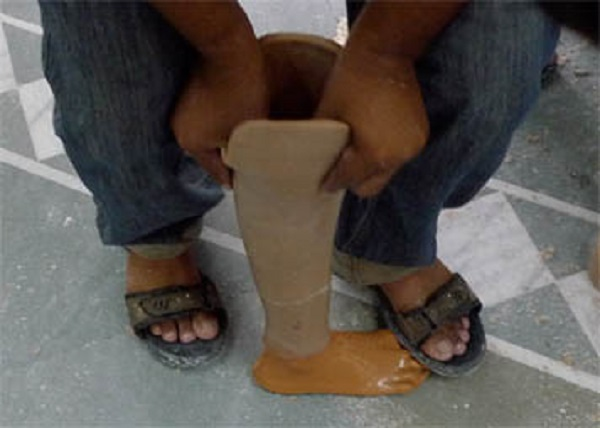
A Jaipur foot in production

The Jaipur foot, also known as the Jaipur leg, is a rubber-based prosthetic leg for people with below-knee amputations. Although inferior in many ways to the composite carbon fibre variants, its variable applicability and cost efficiency make it an acceptable choice for prosthesis. Ram Chandra Sharma and orthopedic surgeon P. K. Sethi designed and developed it in 1968.

The Jaipur foot consists of a rubber core, wooden block and vulcanised rubber coating. It is a soft multi axial artificial foot and provides enough dorsiflexion to permit an amputee to squat. Use of the Jaipur foot is limited to prosthetic users at the level of household and limited community ambulation, since it is unsuitable for high level activities and sports or if the user must transverse uneven terrain.

== History ==
The idea of the Jaipur foot was conceived by Ram Chander Sharma, a craftsman, and P. K. Sethi, who was then the head of the Department of Orthopedics at Sawai Man Singh Medical College in Jaipur. Existing prosthetic feet did not allow users to go barefoot, squat or sit crosslegged, or work in muddy fields, all of which were common in poorer areas of India. Sharma and Sethi set out to design a cheap foot that could work for this cultural context.

The Jaipur foot was named after Jaipur, India, where it was designed.

== Design ==
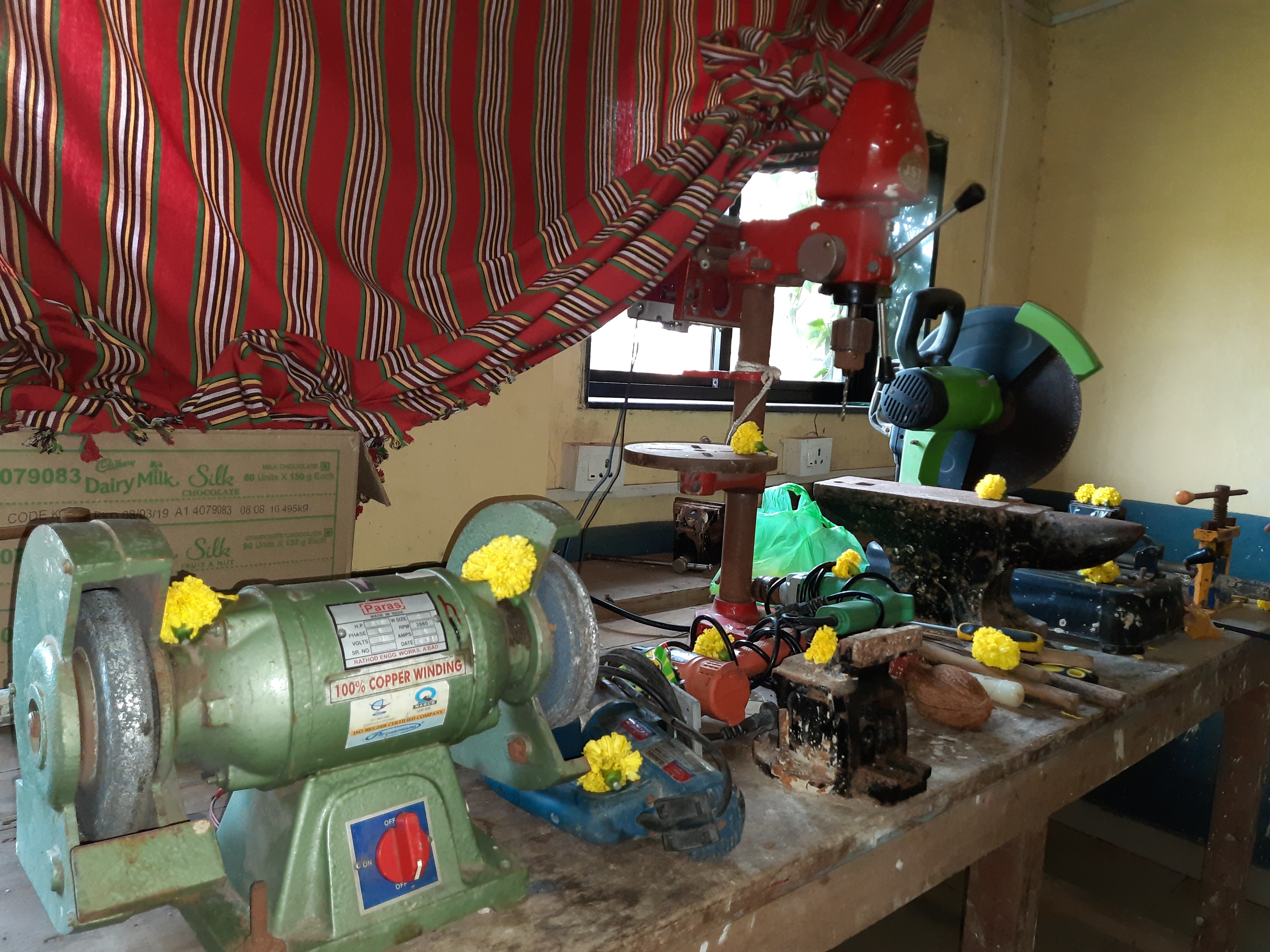
Machinery used for manufacturing a Jaipur foot

The Jaipur foot is composed of a wooden ankle and a rubber heel and forefoot section, all surrounded by a thin outer layer of tire cord, a rubber composite.

It is a modification of the Solid Ankle Cushioned Heel (SACH) foot, with the wooden ankle of the SACH foot replaced with a more flexible block of rubber, which allows the user to squat or sit cross-legged. In the original design, the expensive wooden shank of the SACH foot, used to attach the foot to the user's leg, is replaced with a cheaper aluminum shank. A later version is made of high-density polyethylene, which increases the durability and the convenience of use.

The original version was made primarily of rubber, while a later version is made of polyurethane, which is lighter. However, the Jaipur foot is still heavier than standard prosthetics.

The Jaipur foot has some advantages relative to conventional SACH feet, especially in the range of movements it offers. It is possible to move the ankle and foot thanks to the shorter keel and rubber ankle. The materials used at the foot-end are waterproof and somewhat mimic a real foot. These features help amputees using the foot assimilate more easily in a semi-urban or rural setup in the Indian subcontinent and other developing countries.

The Jaipur foot was never patented or otherwise standardized. As a result, there is significant variation in the quality of feet and their fitting. It has a typical lifespan of around 2–5 years.

== Distribution ==
In India, the Jaipur foot can be fitted for free by Bhagwan Mahaveer Viklang Sahayata Samiti (BMVSS), a charitable organization for amputees and other disabled people founded by Devendra Raj Mehta. The government of India supports BMVSS with financial aid to carry out the work done by the organization. It costs approximately $45 to make. BMVSS, in collaboration with a team at Stanford University, also developed the Jaipur knee - a versatile and budget-friendly prosthetic knee joint that mimics the natural joint's movements. Time listed the Jaipur Knee as one of the best inventions of 2009.

The Jaipur foot is commonly used in low-income countries and warzones as a low-cost alternative to conventional prosthetics. It was used during the war in Afghanistan to help treat land mine victims.

== In popular culture ==
Sudha Chandran, an Indian actress and dancer, lost her limb in an accident in 1982. She was fitted with the Jaipur foot and started dancing once again; her journey is the theme of the Telugu 1984 film Mayuri (Peahen), re-made into a 1986 Hindi film, Naache Mayuri (Peahen Dancing). Both the films starred Sudha as the lead.

== Awards ==
P. K. Sethi was awarded the Magsaysay Award for Community Leadership in 1981, and the Padma Shri by the Government of India in 1981. Dr. D R Mehta received the Rajasthan Ratna for his contribution to Jaipur foot in 2013 by Rajasthan Government.
