= Bhagwan Mahaveer Viklang Sahayata Samiti =

Non-profit organisation in Jaipur, India

Bhagwan Mahaveer Viklang Sahayata Samiti-BMVSS is a Jaipur-based non-profit organization, founded by D.R. Mehta in 1975. It is the world's largest organization for the disabled in terms of fitment of artificial limb, calipers etc., providing them with artificial limbs (including the Jaipur foot), calipers, crutches, ambulatory aids like wheel chairs, and other aids and appliances totally free of cost.

The main objective of BMVSS is the physical and socio-economic rehabilitation of the physically disabled, especially the resource-less, so they may lead a life of dignity and become productive members of the community It also conducts scientific and technical research in developing and improving aids and appliances for the physically challenged and also organizes workshops and seminars for dissemination of knowledge and expertise related to the manufacture of such products.

== Progress ==
Beginning with a very modest fitment of 59 artificial limbs in 1975, BMVSS is now fitting about 20,000 artificial limbs and about 30,000 Polio Calipers, and other aids and appliances every year in its centers and through mobile camps in India and abroad. The foreign countries that it has served include: Afghanistan, Bangladesh, Dominican Republic, Honduras, Nepal, Pakistan, Somalia, Tanzania, Sudan, etc.

== Awards ==
BMVSS received the National Award for the best institution working in the field of Rehabilitation of the Disabled in 1998 from the Indian Ministry of Social Justice and Empowerment. In the following years, it received awards including "Mahaveer Award" from Bhagwan Mahaveer Foundation for the philanthropic services and welfare of the Handicapped", the "Tech award for Innovation for the benefit of humanity, and "Dr PK Sethi Award Innovation Award."
