= Sonana Khetlaji =

Sonana Khetlaji Temple
- Location in Rajasthan, India Sonana Khetlaji (India)

Religion
- Affiliation: Hinduism
- District: Pali District
- Deity: Khetlaji (Lord Bhairav)
- Festival: Chaitra Sudi Prathama fair

Location
- Location: Sonana, Desuri tehsil, Pali district, Rajasthan, India
- State: Rajasthan
- Country: India

Architecture
- Established: Approximately 800 years ago

Sonana Khetlaji is a temple of God Khetlaji located in the village Sonana of Desuri tehsil of Pali district in Indian state of Rajasthan.

Khetlaji is a native folk deity for the people of different caste and creed in the Marwar region. The temple is surrounded by a beautiful Rose garden. The devotees offer their gratitude to the deity for marriage as well as childbirth. After the Aarti, devotees take part in the thanksgiving ceremony. "Churma" is the main Prasad offered to the deity which is distributed among the devotees after offering it to deity. It is believed that the prasad should be consumed within the campus of the temple and cannot be taken outside the temple. Devotees believe that attending the aarti is the biggest blessing.

Every year on Chaitra Sudi Prathama (according to Vikram Samvat), a large fair is organised for two days. Since this fair is organised after Holi festival, many Holi dancers attend in conventional and fancy dresses. More than one lakh devotees participate. The most devout come barefoot from their native places in order to receive the great blessing. They travel from 15 km to 200 km moving in groups (Sangh) for two to ten days barefoot.

There is even a cycle yatri coming from a long distance of 2500 km from Chennai, Coimbatore, Hosur (Tamil Nadu to Rajasthan) covering on cycle for a month (30 days) on the occasion of Mela.

== History ==
Shri Sonana Khetlaji temple was found approximately 800 years ago. The temple demonstrates the beautiful art of the ancient Rajput architecture.

Folk deity Shri Khetlaji is worshipped as Lord Bhairav who is considered as the fifth incarnation of Lord Shiva. Shree Khetlaji is also known as Shri Bhairav or Shri Kshetrapaal Ji. Sonana Khetlaji temple also has an idol of a snake which is believed to be one of the forms of Shree Ketlaji. This idol is a self - manifested. Shree Khetlaji came to Mandor from Kashi. Later, he visited Sonana. It is believed that Lord Bhairav used to protect the sages who were meditating in the Aravalli hill range. Lord Bhairav made his abode in one of the caves which were located at Sonana Khetlaji. Hence, it became his permanent abode and people started worshipping him at this place.

== Festivals and Fairs ==
Every year on Chaitra Sudi Prathama, a fair is held for two days in the honor of Shri Khetlaji. This fair is organized immediately after Holi. Thousands of devotees participate in this fair. The devotees visit the temple on barefoot in order to receive the great blessings.

However, the fair also features hundreds of Thoroughbred and trained 'Marwari' horses which perform different skills including movement to the rhythms of musical instruments.

== Access ==
By Road: Bus services are available from other major cities of Rajasthan. Desuri is the nearest bus stand.

By Train: The nearest railway station is Rani railway station.

By Air: The nearby airport is located at Udaipur.
