= Khetlaji =

Folk deity

- Other names: Shri Bhairav, Shri Kshetrapaal Ji
- Affiliation: Sri Bhairav (considered as the fifth incarnation of bhgwan Shiva)
- Abode: Caves in Aravalli hill range, Sonana Khetlaji
- Symbols: Snake idol believed to be a form of Shree Ketlaji
- Region: Rajasthan, India
- Temples: Sonana Khetlaji temple, Sewari, Sayala, Bherugadh Khetlaji Mandir
- Festivals: Two-day fair during May–June

Khetlaji (खेतलाजी) is a folk deity of India who is primarily venerated in Rajasthan. Folk deity Shri Khetlaji is worshipped as Lord Bhairav who is considered as the fifth incarnation of Lord Shiva. Shree Khetlaji is also known as Shri Bhairav or Shri Kshetrapaal Ji. Sonana Khetlaji temple also has an idol of a snake which is believed to be one of the forms of Shree Khetlaji. This idol is a self - manifested. Shree Khetlaji came to Mandor from Kashi. Later, he visited Sonana. It is believed that Lord Bhairav used to protect the sages who were meditating in the Aravalli hill range. Lord Bhairav made his abode in one of the caves which were located at Sonana village. Hence, it became his permanent abode and people started worshipping him at this place. One of the shrine is located in village Sonana in Pali district of Rajasthan.

The temple is the site of a two-day fair, held every year during May–June in honor of Khetlaji. The fair attracts a large number of devotees who congregate here during the fair to invoke the blessing of the deity. There are many shrines of Khetlaji like Sewari, Sayala and Bherugadh Khetlaji Mandir located at Lorwada in Banaskantha district of Gujarat.

== See also ==
- Sonana Khetlaji
