= Ram Gopal Vijayvargiya =

Indian painter (1905–2003)

- Born: 1905; Baler, Sawai Madhopur district, Rajasthan, India
- Died: 2003 (aged 97–98)
- Education: Maharaja School of Arts, Jaipur
- Known for: Painting
- Notable work: 'Vijayvargiya Picture Album' (1934), 'Meghdoot Chitravali' (1945), 'Behari Chitravali' (1945), 'Rajasthani paintings' (1952)
- Movement: Bengal School
- Awards: Padma Shri in Arts

Ram Gopal Vijayvargiya (1905–2003) was an Indian painter. He was also a poet and a writer.

== Life and career ==
He was born in 1905 at Baler Sawai Madhopur district in Rajasthan state in India. He learnt painting at the Maharaja School of Arts in Jaipur where the artist Asit Kumar Haldar was Principal. Later he went to Kolkata where he absorbed further influences from the Bengal School, especially the artist Shailendra Nath De whom he considered his guru

His first exhibition was held in 1928 at Fine Arts & Crafts Society, Calcutta and thereafter many in other major cities of India. His images are inspired by Indian legends and literary works. They frequently appeared as plates in literary magazines of the time such as Modern Review and Vishal Bharat, and later in Dharmyug

He was principal of Rajasthan Kala Mandir and Rajasthan School of Art from 1945 to 1966. He was vice president, Rajasthan Lalit Kala Akademi, 1958-60.

Publications on Vijayvargiya: 'Vijayvargiya Picture Album', 1934; 'Meghdoot Chitravali' 1945; 'Behari Chitravali', 1945; 'Rajasthani paintings', 1952; Monograph published by Lalit Kala Akademi, 1988; 'Roopankar' (biography), 1991 and volume II 'Paintings' 1995.

== Awards ==
- Maharaja Patiala, 1934
- Rajasthan Lalit Kala Akademi, 1958
- Padma Shri in 1984
- Fellow, Lalit Kala Akademi, New Delhi 1988
- Honour of ’Sahitya Vachaspati’ from Hindi Sahitya Sammelan, Prayag, 1998

== Books ==
On Art

Vijayvargiya, Ramgopal. 1953. Rajasthani Chitrakala. Jaipur: Vijayvargiya Kala Mandal.

Fiction

Vijayvargiya, Ramgopal. 1969. Mehndi Lage Haath aur Kajal Bhari Ankhen

Vijayvargiya, Ramgopal. 1998. Vasanti. Jaipur: Sahityagar.

Vijayvargiya, Ramgopal. 1998. Madhyam marg. Jaipur: Sahityagar.

Poetry

Vijayvargiya, Ramgopal. Nisarga Mañjarī. Jaipur: Padmaśrī Rāmagopal Vijayavargīya Memoriyal Ṭrusṭ, 2005
