= Sanjay Puri (architect) =

Indian architect

- Born: 1965 (age 60–61); Rajasthan, India
- Citizenship: Indian
- Education: Mayo College; Rachana Sansad Academy of Architecture, Mumbai
- Occupation: Architect
- Years active: 1988–present
- Organization(s): Sanjay Puri Architects (1992–present); Architect Hafeez Contractor (1983-1988)
- Spouse: Nina Puri
- Website: Official website

Sanjay Puri (born 1965) is an Indian architect. His work is characterised by climate-responsive design, incorporating elements such as courtyards, shading devices and perforated screens. He is the founder and principal architect of Sanjay Puri Architects, a Mumbai-based architectural firm.

Some of his notable projects include the Nokha Village Community Centre, Bombay Art Society building, Aatma Manthan Museum, the Rajasthan School, the Street student housing project at GLA University, Mirai House of Arches, Prestige University and Jabalpur's Hitkarni University.

== Early life ==
He completed his schooling at St. Xavier's High School, Mumbai. He attended Mayo College and later studied at the Rachana Sansad Academy of Architecture, Mumbai from where he graduated in 1988. Puri has stated in interviews that reading The Fountainhead (1943) influenced his decision to pursue architecture.

== Career ==
Puri worked with Hafeez Contractor during his studies and after graduation, initially as an associate and later as a senior associate. He established his architectural practice, Sanjay Puri Architects, in 1992 after receiving a commission to design Vasant Nagari township in Vasai, near Mumbai.

His early work included housing projects, followed by hospitality and commercial developments in the late 1990s, including the Mirador hotel in Mumbai and the R World entertainment centre in Ahmedabad. His project Terasa 153 in Montenegro won the award for Best Residential Building at the World Architecture Festival in 2012.

Puri gained recognition for designing the headquarters of the Bombay Art Society, a 128-year-old nonprofit contemporary art venue, completed in 2011. The building comprises gallery spaces and offices arranged within a concrete structure. The project received the Popular Choice Award at the Architizer A+Awards in 2014.

In 2013, at the MIPIM AR Future Projects Award, Puri's D Hotel project in India won in the leisure category, while his projects The Street and Sanskriti received commendations in the offices and tall buildings categories respectively.

Puri designed the Mumbai Sky Courts project in Mumbai, which received the MIPIM Architectural Review Future Project Award in 2014. The project is characterised by varied floor layouts and vertically arranged open spaces, creating differentiated residential units within a high-rise structure.

The Rajasthan School in Ras, Rajasthan, was designed by Puri as part of a township and was completed in 2020, with a low-rise layout incorporating open and semi-enclosed spaces to facilitate natural ventilation and daylight. In 2022, he completed the Mirai House of Arches in Bhilwara, Rajasthan. The project adopts a context-sensitive design approach in response to local climatic conditions. The project later received the 2023 Architizer A+Award Popular Winner in the Residential-Private House category and the 2023 Créateurs Design Award for Best Residential Project in Architecture.

In 2024, he completed the Nokha Village Community Centre in Rajasthan, a project intended to serve 144 villages in the Nokha district. The centre was developed as a public space for gatherings, learning and recreation. The building uses locally sourced materials and features a curvilinear form surrounding the site. It was named the World Building of the Year 2024 in a global poll conducted by World-Architects. In the same year, he also designed 'The Forest', a high-density mixed-use development in the Democratic Republic of the Congo inspired by African forest forms and incorporating climate-responsive design strategies.

In 2026, Puri designed an academic building for Prestige University in Indore, Madhya Pradesh, whose design was inspired by traditional Indian stepwells.

=== Other work ===
Puri has served as a juror at the World Architecture Festival and has also been on the jury for the Architectural Review Awards, the Dezeen Awards, the Plan Awards, and the Inde Awards. He is a member of the Royal Institute of British Architects, the Indian Institute of Architects, the Indian Institute of Interior Designers and the Society of American Registered Architects, and has served on the Government of India's Heritage Conservation Committee in New Delhi.

== Notable projects ==
Year	Project	Location	Notes	Source
2026	Prestige University	Indore, India	Institutional campus building, stepwell-inspired design	
2024	Aatma Manthan Museum	Nathdwara, India	Museum project, BLT Built Design Award (Interior Design of the Year)	
2024	Nokha Village Community Centre	Rajasthan, India	Community project serving multiple villages	
2022	Mirai House of Arches	Bhilwara, India	Residential project	
2020	The Rajasthan School	Nagaur, India	Educational project, climate-responsive design	
2018	The Street (GLA University)	Mathura, India	winner at World Architecture Festival (Housing category)	
2017	72 Screens	Jaipur, India	Office building, was recognised for facade and environmental design	
2016	Ishatvam 9	Ranchi, India	Residential building	
2015	Courtyard House	Rajasthan, India	Residential project based on courtyard typology	
2014	Sky Courts	Mumbai, India	Residential project, winner at MIPIM Architectural Review Future Project Awards	
2013	D Hotel	Lucknow, India	Winner (Leisure category) at MIPIM Architectural Review Future Project Awards	
2012	Terasa 153	Montenegro	Residential (future project), winner at World Architecture Festival	
2011	G.I. School	Mumbai, India	Institutional project	
2010	Cubes	Pune, India	Office project, received commendation at MIPIM Awards	

== Awards and recognition ==
Puri was included in the Hot 100 list by Architect and Interiors India in 2017, 2018, 2024 and 2025. His project Aatma Manthan Museum in Nathdwara, Rajasthan, received the BLT Built Design Award for Interior Design of the Year in 2024. Architectural Digest included his firm in the AD100 list in 2019, 2021, 2023 and 2025.

In 2013, Puri won the MIPIM AR Future Projects Award in the leisure category for D Hotel, and in 2014, his Sky Courts, Mumbai project received the same award.

In 2017, projects including 'Reservoir' in Rajasthan and 'The Village' in Alibag received International Architecture Awards from the Chicago Athenaeum Museum of Architecture and Design. He was included in the Forbes India list "The Bold Club: India’s Top 30 Architects" in 2018.

In 2021, a project by Puri received the Best Interior Project award at the LEAF Awards.

Sanjay Puri Architects received World Architecture Festival awards for Offices 63 in the Future Projects (Commercial) category in Barcelona in 2010, The Street as the winner of the Large Scale Housing category in Amsterdam in 2018, and Ras Houses as the winner of the Housing category in Lisbon in 2022. In 2023, the firm won the Completed Buildings: Production, Energy and Logistics category at the World Architecture Festival in Singapore for The Courtyard CCR Lab.

Sanjay Puri and members of his family are among the architectural practices examined in the book Architectural Inheritance and Evolution in India (2023) by Apurva Bose Dutta, published by Cambridge Scholars Publishing, which explores intergenerational architectural practices in India.

Puri's Mirai House of Arches was featured in 20×20: Twenty Architects × Twenty Iconic Homes of India (2024), a book by Gauri Kelkar published by Roli Books on contemporary Indian residential architecture.

== See also ==
- List of Indian architects
- List of World Architecture Festival winners
