= Sultan Singh Rathore =

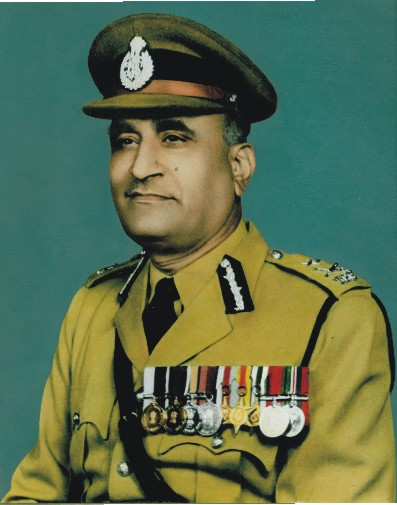

Chief of Rajasthan Police
- In office 7 November 1968 – 16 February 1974

Personal details
- Born: April 1, 1916 Chordiyan, Shergarh, Jodhpur district, Rajasthan
- Died: November 10, 1974 (aged 58)
- Spouse(s): Shrimati Ratan Kanwar (Ex-MLA, Shergarh)
- Children: Shri Prabhu Singh Rathore, Shrimati Chandrakanta Bhati
- Education: LL.B from Law College, Hindu University, Banaras
- Awards: Shaurya Chakra

Sultan Singh Rathore (1 April 1916 – 10 November 1974) was a former chief of Rajasthan Police. He served in that position from 7 November 1968 to 16 February 1974. He was awarded the prestigious Shaurya Chakra.

== Personal life ==
His father's name was Major Laxman Singh Rathore and his mother was Shrimati Mahtab Kanwar. He was born in the village of Chordiyan, tehsil Shergargh in the district of Jodhpur in Rajasthan. He was married to Shrimati Ratan Kanwar (Ex-MLA, Shergargh) and they had one son Shri Prabhu Singh Rathore, and one daughter, Shrimati Chandrakanta Bhati.

Sultan Singh Rathore completed high school from Chopasani School, Jodhpur, Bachelor of Arts from Jaswant College, Jodhpur and completed his LL.B from Law College, Hindu University, Banaras

== Career ==
1940–1948

Sultan Singh Rathore joined service as Sub-Inspector then in 1946 he became Hakim (1st class Magistrate of Jodhpur) and in 1948 he was promoted to major in the army.

1948–1952

He was Transfer to Indian Police Service in 1948 and was appointed as Superintendent of Police and his first posting was Jodhpur. He served as Superintendent of Police at Alwar, Jaipur and Bharatpur.

1952–1974

He was promoted to Deputy Inspector General of Police in 1952 and in 1963 he also served as DIGP Rajasthan Armed Constabulary at Jodhpur. In 1968 he was promoted to Inspector General of Police, Rajasthan; he remained on the post till 15 February 1974.

On 16 February 1974 he was appointed as Director Civil Defence & Commandant General, Home Guards, Rajasthan, and in the same year on 10 November 1974 he died due to heart failure.
