= Puran Bhatt =

Indian puppeteer

Puran Bhaat
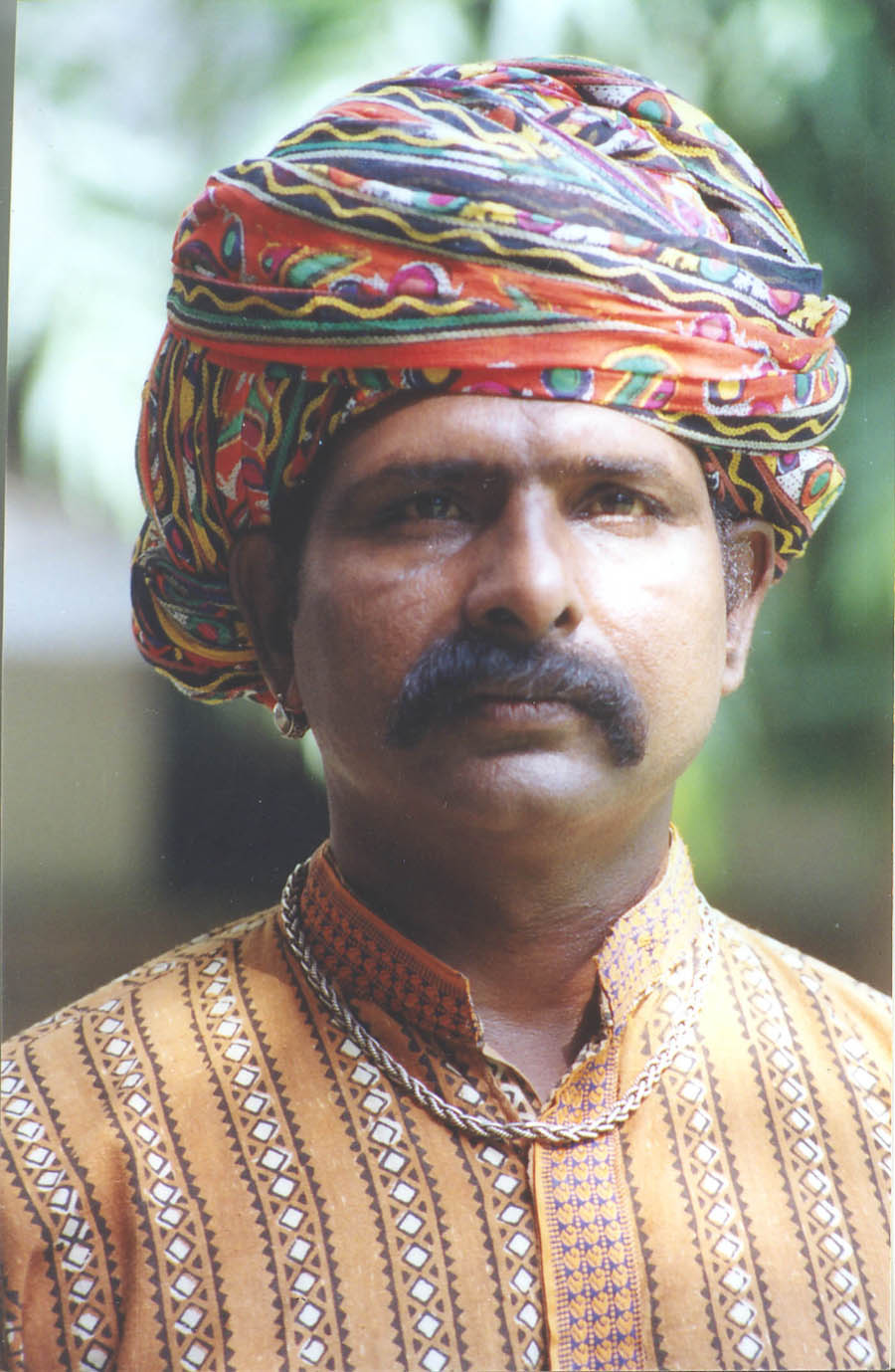
- A portrait of Shri Puran Bhaat who was presented with the Sangeet Natak Akademi Award for Puppetry - Rajasthan by the President Dr. A.P.J Abdul Kalam in New Delhi on 26 October 2004
- Born: Rajasthan, India
- Occupation: Puppeteer
- Notable work: Tomorrow We Disappear
- Awards: Sangeet Natak Akademi Award (2003)

Puran Bhaat is a puppeteer from India. Originally from Rajasthan, his group of puppeteer families settled in Delhi almost fifty years ago. They currently reside in the Kathputli Colony at Delhi, an artist community.

He was awarded the Sangeet Natak Akademi Award in 2003, given by the Sangeet Natak Akademi, India's National Academy of Music, Dance & Drama.

Bhaat was one of the primary subjects of the 2014 docudrama Tomorrow We Disappear, which revolves around the Kathputli Colony facing impending eviction in order to build high-rise housing on the outskirts of New Delhi.

== See also ==
- Kathputli (Puppet)
