= Falahari Baba =

Indian prisoner

- Born: Gautam Mishra
- Other name: Swami Kaushlendra Prapannachari Falahari Maharaj
- Occupations: Spiritual leader, preacher
- Children: 1
- Status: In Prison
- Criminal charges: Rape
- Penalty: Life imprisonment

Details
- Date apprehended: 23 September 2017

Falahari Baba, also known as Falahari Maharaj (born as Gautam Mishra), is a self-styled Indian godman, who has been convicted for raping a 21 year-old woman and sentenced to life imprisonment. He is listed in the second list of "fake spiritual leaders" released by Akhil Bharatiya Akhara Parishad, the apex body of Hindu sadhus.

== Life ==
His full name is Swami Kaushlendra Prapannachari Falahari Maharaj. He studied up to class XII and also holds an ITI certificate course from Allahabad. He left his home and came to Alwar, Rajasthan in the 1990s. Falahari is married and has a daughter.

He was dubbed "Falahari" (meaning fruit eater) because, he survived by only eating fruits, reportedly. He is reported to be 60 years old by The Times of India and 70 years old by The Free Press Journal, as of September 2017. He is associated with Ramanuja sampradaya.

He has been photographed with top political leaders and celebrities including prime minister Narendra Modi, home minister Rajnath Singh, the RSS chief Mohan Bhagwat, UP CM Yogi Adityanath and Rajasthan CM Vasundhara Raje Scindia.

He owns an Ashram in Alwar, called Venkatesh Divya Balaji Dham Ashram and also run Goshala in Alwar. In July, 2017, he had also attended to the Saint Sangam of BJP organized in Jaipur.

== Rape case and conviction ==
In September 2017, an FIR was lodged by the victim against Baba at Mahila police station of Bilaspur in Chhattisgarh. He was arrested on 23 September 2017, in Alwar. International Business Times reported, the victim said in the complaint that following the conviction of Gurmeet Ram Rahim Singh, she got courage and decided to report the matter to the police.

He was convicted and sentenced to life imprisonment by Additional District court of Alwar on 27 September 2018.

== See also ==
- Asaram
- Gurmeet Ram Rahim Singh
