= Veer Singh Mehta =

Indian neurosurgeon

- Born: December 5, 1949 (age 76); Rajasthan, India
- Education: SMS Medical College Jaipur, AIIMS
- Occupation: Neurosurgeon
- Known for: Surgery for brachial plexus injuries, Brainstem Surgery, Brachial Plexus Surgery, Aneurysms, Spinal Tumor Surgery
- Awards: Padma Shri (2005)

Veer Singh Mehta (born 5 December 1949 in Rajasthan, India), is an Indian neurosurgeon. He received his education and training at SMS Medical College Jaipur and later at AIIMS. Mehta is a pioneer in surgery for brachial plexus injuries in India and is an elected fellow of the National Academy of Medical Sciences. He was elected as the president of the Neurological Society and as the President of the South Asian Neurosurgeons. He is known for his work in the field of brain stem surgery, brachial plexus surgery, aneurysms and spinal tumor surgery. He is a well known brain tumor surgeon in India and has treated numerous Indian and International patient all across the globe for brain disorders. The Government of India awarded him Padma Shri in 2005. Noted neurosurgeon B. K. Misra was his junior at AIIMS Delhi.
