= Rajpal Singh Yadav =

Indian scientist

- Born: 1958 (age 67–68); Anandpur, Rajasthan, India
- Education: University of Rajasthan
- Occupation: Scientist
- Spouse: Ajnesh Yadav
- Scientific career
- Fields: Vector biology, Vector control, Malaria, Dengue, Chikungunya, Pesticide management
- Workplaces: World Health Organization; Indian Council of Medical Research

Rajpal Singh Yadav (born 1958) is an Indian scientist in the field of vector ecology and management. He joined the World Health Organization in 2009. He retired in 2023, as a Scientist at the Department of Control of Neglected Tropical Diseases, Geneva, Switzerland. He was a Co-Chair of the WHO Joint Action Group for the implementation of the Global Vector Control Response, (WHO HQ/NTD, Geneva). He was also Head of the WHO Pesticide Evaluation Scheme (WHOPES) for the evaluation of vector control products (Feb 2013 – Oct 2017). During this period he reviewed research protocols and generated a global evidence base for insecticide use and pesticide management. He was also a Focal person in, the WHO secretariat for the FAO/WHO Joint Programme on Pesticide Management. The work involved collaboration with other UN and international organizations, research institutions, programmes, industry, NGOs, and other stakeholders. He is the recipient of the 2016, Lifetime Achievement Award from the Indian Association of Entomologists. He has published more than 100 scientific articles in peer-reviewed journals.

== Early life and education ==
Rajpal Singh Yadav was born in Ahir(Yadav) family in Anandpur, Rajasthan, India to Sanskrit scholar Raghuvir Singh Yadav and Mota Devi.
He graduated with a bachelor's degree in Biology in 1977 from the University of Rajasthan, Jaipur, India. Later, from the same university, he received his M.Sc degree in Zoology in 1979 with a University gold medal and received his Ph.D. in science in 1984 in the field of insect toxicology, for which he received fellowships of the Council of Scientific and Industrial Research and Indian Council of Medical Research. In 1989, he finished a certificate course in tropical epidemiology at the College of Public Health, University of the Philippines, Manila. In 1999, he received the British Council Fellowship in health impact assessment of development projects at the Liverpool School of Tropical Medicine, Liverpool, UK.

== Career ==
After obtaining his Ph.D. in 1984, he joined as a lecturer for a short period in the postgraduate Department of Zoology, Government College Dungarpur, Rajasthan, India. From late 1984 till 2008, he served various positions at the National Institute of Malaria Research (NIMR, previously Malaria Research Center). In 2009, he joined as a scientist in vector ecology and management in the Department of Control of Neglected Tropical Diseases, World Health Organization, Geneva, Switzerland. He also managed several global assignments with the World Health Organization in 2001, 2002, 2004 and 2007. He was founder head of NIMR field centre in Rourkela which he headed from 1988 to 1995 and has served as Deputy Director (Senior Grade) and chief of NIMR field centre in Nadiad, Gujarat (1996-2008). He has over 28 years of experience in the field of vector bionomics and control, malariology and pesticide management. He contributed to WHO's normative functions of providing guidance on evaluation of new insecticides for use in public health.

== Contribution in Public Health ==
During his early career, Dr. Yadav and his team pioneered the integrated approaches for malaria control. Later, he made significant contribution in developing policies and strategies for malaria control in India and South East Asia. He was instrumental in training medical entomologists and public health workers. He organized workshops for intersectoral collaboration in public health and sanitation bringing together non-health and non-governmental sectors. Dr Yadav has led teams in controlling malaria, dengue and chikungunya outbreaks and participated in mitigating many public health emergencies owing to earthquakes and heavy rainfall. His work has taken him across the world including in forested and tribal areas of SE Asia and socio-politically disturbed areas of Africa.

Presently, he is working in a team of the department of control of neglected tropical diseases that manages the WHO Pesticide Evaluation Scheme (WHOPES).

For his outstanding contributions to the field of vector borne disease control, he was bestowed 'Best Scientist Award for Environmental Science 2011' by the National Academy of Vector Borne Diseases, India. Earlier on, he was honored by the Indian Medical Association for his role in malaria control in the Gujarat state.

== Publications ==
=== Selected Journals ===
- van den Berg; J. Hii; A. Soares; A. Mnzava; B. Ameneshewa; A.P. Dash; M. Ejov; S. H. Tan; G. Matthews; R. S. Yadav; M. Zaim (2011), "Status of pesticide management in the practice of vector control: a global survey in countries at risk of malaria or other major vector-borne diseases.", Malaria Journal, 10: 10–125, doi:10.1186/1475-2875-10-125, PMC 3117749, PMID 21569601
- Laneri, Karina; Bhadra, Anindya; Ionides, Edward L.; Bouma, Menno; Dhiman, Ramesh C.; Yadav, Rajpal S.; Pascual, Mercedes (2 September 2010). "Forcing versus feedback: epidemic malaria and monsoon rains in northwest India". PLOS Computational Biology. 6 (9) e1000898. Bibcode:2010PLSCB...6E0898L. doi:10.1371/journal.pcbi.1000898. ISSN 1553-7358. PMC 2932675. PMID 20824122.
- Yadav, R.S. & M. Zaim (2010), "WHO Pesticide Evaluation Scheme - 50 Years of contribution to global public health.", Plasmodium: 3–5
- Prajapati SK, Verma A, Adak T, Yadav RS, Kumar A, Eapen A, Das MK, Singh N, Sharma SK, Rizvi MA, Dash AP, Joshi H (2006), "Allelic dimorphism of Plasmodium vivax gam-1 in the Indian subcontinent.", Malaria Journal, 5: 5–90, doi:10.1186/1475-2875-5-90, PMC 1630701, PMID 17062127
- Srivastava HC, Kumar GP, Hassan A, Dabhi M, Pant CP, Yadav RS (2005), "Evaluation of possible health effects of pyrethroid insecticides, Bifenthrin 10% WP, and deltamethrin 25% WG, on spraymen exposed in a field trial in India.", Bulletin of Environmental Contamination and Toxicology, 75 (3): 75:413–420, Bibcode:2005BuECT..75..413S, doi:10.1007/s00128-005-0769-x, PMID 16385944, S2CID 35580169
- Yadav, Rajpal S.; Srivastava, H. C.; Adak, T.; Nanda, N.; Thapar, B. R.; Pant, C. S.; Zaim, Morteza; Subbarao, Sarala K. (January 2003). "House-scale evaluation of bifenthrin indoor residual spraying for malaria vector control in India". Journal of Medical Entomology. 40 (1): 58–63. doi:10.1603/0022-2585-40.1.58. ISSN 0022-2585. PMID 12597653. S2CID 15580968.
- Yadav R.S., T.R.R. Sampath & V.P. Sharma (2001), "Deltamethrin treated bednets for control of malaria transmitted by Anopheles culicifacies (Diptera: Culicidae) in India.", Journal of Medical Entomology, 38 (5): 613–622, doi:10.1603/0022-2585-38.5.613, PMID 11580032, S2CID 5650553
- Yadav R.S., V.P. Sharma & S.K. Chand (1997), "Mosquito breeding and resting in tree holes in a forest ecosystem in Orissa.", Indian Journal of Malariology, 34 (1): 8–16, PMID 9291669
- Yadav, R.S. & V.P. Sharma (1997), "Global experiences on insecticide treated mosquito nets and other materials for personal protection and control of vector-borne diseases.", Journal of Parasitic Diseases: 21:123–130
- Subbarao, Sarala K.; Nanda, Nutan; Vasantha, K.; Dua, V. K.; Malhotra, M. S.; Yadav, R. S.; Sharma, V. P. (1 January 1994). "Cytogenetic Evidence for Three Sibling Species in Anopheles fluviatilis (Diptera: Culicidae)". Annals of the Entomological Society of America. 87 (1): 116–121. doi:10.1093/aesa/87.1.116. ISSN 1938-2901.
- Ghosh, S. K.; Yadav, R. S.; Sharma, V. P. (December 1992). "Sensitivity status of Plasmodium falciparum to chloroquine, amodiaquine, quinine, mefloquine and sulfadoxine/pyrimethamine in a tribal population of District Sundargarh, Orissa". Indian Journal of Malariology. 29 (4): 211–218. ISSN 0367-8326. PMID 1291342.
- Yadav, R. S.; Sharma, R. C.; Bhatt, R. M.; Sharma, V. P. (June 1989). "Studies on the anopheline fauna of Kheda district and species specific breeding habitats". Indian Journal of Malariology. 26 (2): 65–74. ISSN 0367-8326. PMID 2792472.
- Yadav, R.S. & S. C. Saxena (1984), "Safety evaluation of microbial insecticide (Bacillus thuringiensis var. israelensis) on non-target animals.", Pestology, 8 (8): 37–40
- Yadav, R.S. & S. C. Saxena (1984), "Field evaluation of Bacillus thuringiensis israelensis against the larvae of Culex quinquefasciatus Say.", Pestology, 8 (7): 29–30
- Saxena, S.C. & R. S. Yadav (1983), "A new plant extract to suppress the population build up of Tribolium castaneum (Herbst).", In Proc. Ill International Working Conf. On Stored Product Entomology, Kansas, USA: 209–212
- Saxena, S.C. & R. S. Yadav (1983), "A new plant extract to suppress the population of yellow fever and dengue vector Aedes aegypti L. (Diptera: Culicidae).", Current Science, 52 (15): 713–715
- Saxena, S.C. & R. S. Yadav (1982), "New mosquito larvicides from indigenous plants Delonix regia and Oligochaeta ramosa.", Advances in Biosciences, 1 (1): 92–94
