= Vibhor Sogani =

Indian artist/product designer (born 1967/1968)

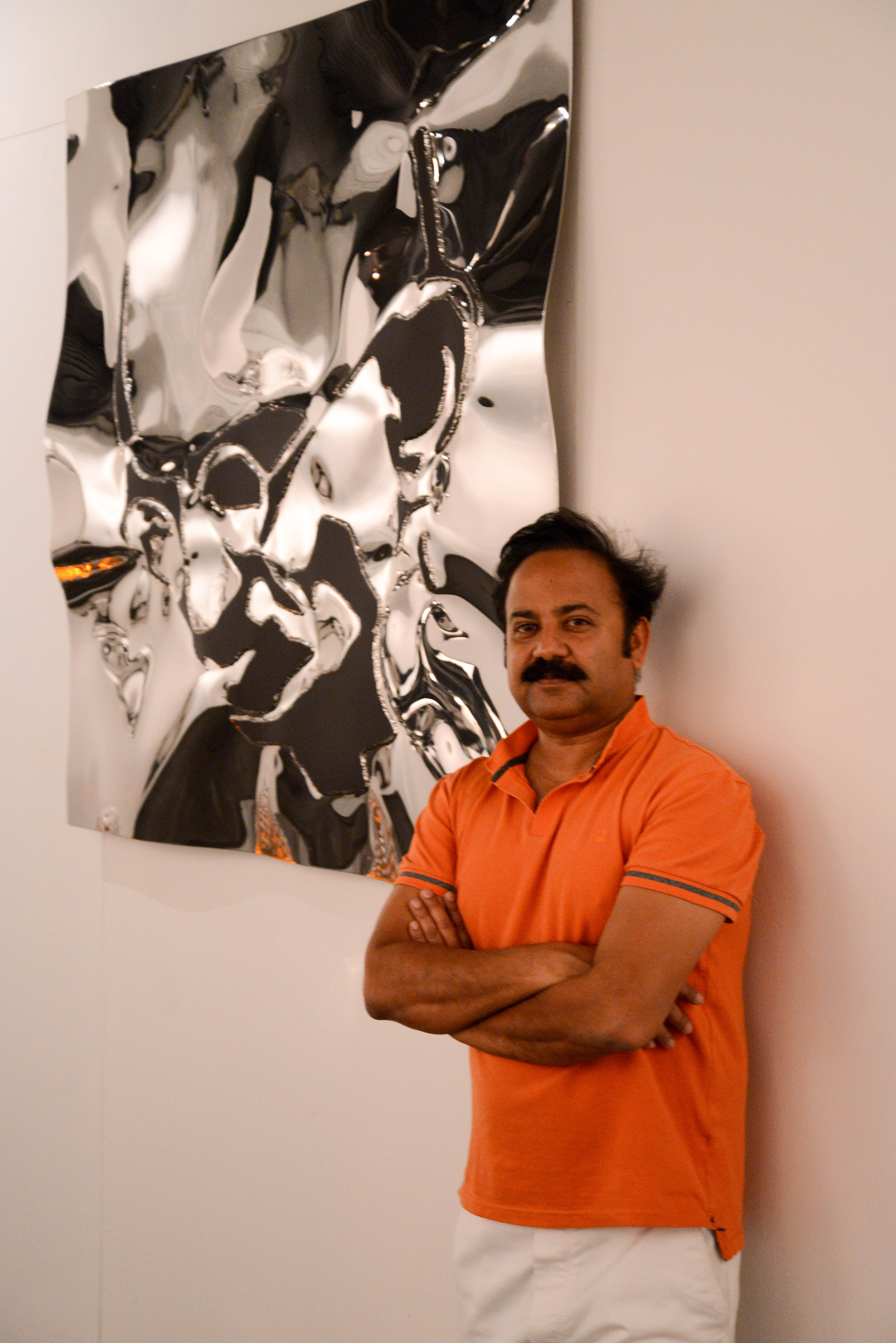
- Vibhor Sogani in 2017
- Born: 24 December 1967 (age 58); Jaipur, Rajasthan, India
- Education: National Institute of Design
- Occupations: Artist; product designer
- Years active: 1992–present
- Known for: Sprouts and Kalpavriksha
- Website: https://www.vibhorsogani.com

Vibhor Sogani (born 1967) is an Indian artist and designer known for his large-scale public art installations. His work, which spans various mediums, sits at the intersection of sculpture, spatial design, and public engagement, often reflecting themes of growth, transformation, and cultural heritage. One of Sogani’s most significant public art installations is Sprouts, located near the AIIMS flyover in New Delhi.

Born in Jaipur, Sogani has been living and working in the Delhi NCR region for over 25 years. He received the IIID Design Excellence Honours from the Indian Institute of Interior Designers in 2022 and the Lifetime Design Excellence Award from the World Design Organisation in 2025.

== Early life and education ==
Vibhor Sogani was born in Jaipur, Rajasthan, where he cultivated an early interest in art and design. He pursued formal education in Industrial Design at the National Institute of Design in Ahmedabad, completing his studies in 1992.

== Career ==
=== Vibhor Sogani Studio ===
In 1993, Vibhor Sogani founded his own design studio, which has been instrumental in shaping his career, providing a platform for Sogani to create both design and artistic works.

In the initial years, he engaged in a wide range of creative projects in the areas of exhibition, graphic, retail and product design, for some of the top global brands. Given his diverse interests, he also handled projects like developing India's first few Go‐ Karting tracks, upgradation of copper craft in Kashmir, designing & producing some of the prominent trophies for international sports matches & Government events.

Sogani was nominated by the Government of India as the member of the governing body to the Indian Design Council.

=== Signature brand of Lifestyle collection ===
In August 2002, Sogani launched his Signature Brand of Lifestyle Accessories under the label ‘Vibhor Sogani’, and had his first solo design show at the India Habitat Centre, New Delhi. He is one of the first Indian designers to launch a signature lifestyle accessory label which retailed through national and international boutiques.

SOGANI, a Signature brand of lights by Vibhor Sogani, launched in 2007, created a spark in the lighting industry. The Lights, bordering on Light installations, are an eclectic mix of Indian artisanal skills and technology. Sogani unveiled an exclusive high end bespoke collection at the Light + Building fair in Frankfurt, Germany in 2018.

=== Trophy Design ===
Sogani has designed several trophies over the years for national and international events, including: Prime Minister's Award for Excellence 2016, Nexa Excellence Trophy 2016, Prime Minister's award for Best Integrated Steel Plant, Elle Décor Design awards 2014, Samsung Cup (India- Pakistan Cricket Series in Pakistan −2004), Pepsi Cup (India –Pakistan Cricket Series 2005), The PHL Trophy (Premier Hockey League), The Hutch-Delhi Half Marathon, Allianz Cup (Pakistan vs. India Test Series 2006, ONGC-Nehru Football Cup (2007–08). and the 72 The League Trophy for the inaugural edition of the Professional Golf Tour of India’s franchise-based golf league in 2026.

=== Exhibition Design ===
Sogani ventured into Exhibition design with exhibits for DCM group, Lufthansa, Jet Airways, VIP industries, World Gold Council, Escorts Yamaha, Ford Motors and massive 2100 sq. metres DRDO (Defence Research and Development Organization) pavilions (at Defexpo 2002, 2004 and 2006) and in the process has claimed various awards.

== Public Art Installations and Notable Works (Selected) ==
=== Sprouts ===
‘Sprouts’, a 40 feet high site-specific public art installation, is spread over 6 acres of greens near the AIIMS hospital in the heart of Delhi.

‘From walled city to world city’ was the one-line brief given to Vibhor Sogani by Sheila Dixit, who was the Chief Minister of Delhi.

The installation symbolised a nascent nation, growing and ‘sprouting’ after 60 years of independence.

=== A’rise ===
Inspired by Airtel’s innovative spirit, A’rise is a 22-feet dynamic steel sculpture by Vibhor Sogani for the company’s national headquarters in Gurugram, India.

This installation is a homage to Airtel's process, progress, and pursuit of excellence.

=== Joy ===
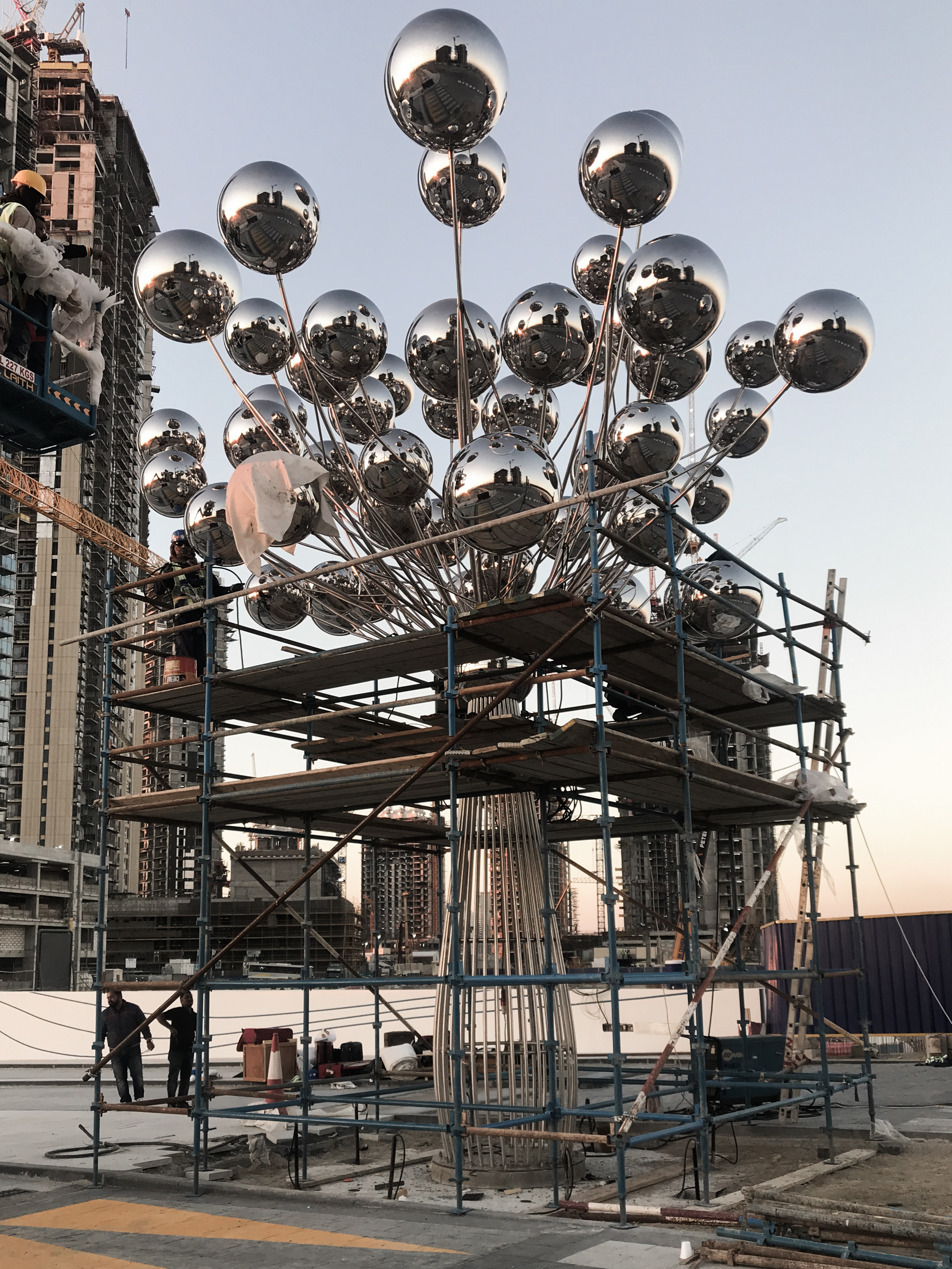
Installation of Joy at Dubai Creek Harbour in Dubai, United Arab Emirates

Joy is a 30-foot tall public art installation located in Dubai, United Arab Emirates. Created as part of an initiative by Art EMAAR, the installation is envisioned as a tribute to the beauty, joy, and purity found in life. The artwork takes the form of a bouquet of balloons, designed to reflect the ever-changing environment.

=== Kalpataru ===
In July 2024, on the occasion of the 46th World Heritage Committee Meeting, Project PARI (Public Art Project of India) was launched. Vibhor Sogani created the artwork, Kalpataru for this initiative. This work was accomplished with the support of the Ministry of Culture, Government of India and the National Gallery of Modern Art. The 20-foot tall light art installation is located at the prominent intersection of Tuglaq and APJ Abdul Kalam Road, New Delhi. This work embodies the sacred tree of ancient lore. A symbol of abundance, prosperity and fulfilment of desires.

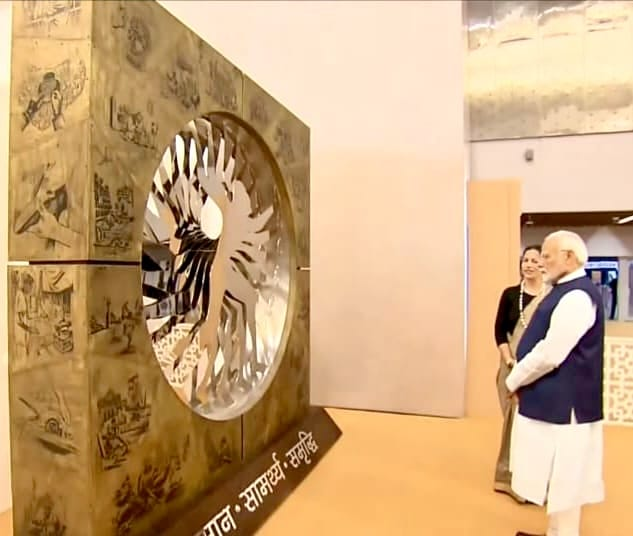
Prime Minister of India, Narendra Modi at the launch of PM Vishwakarma Scheme and Yashobhoomi, with Vibhor Sogani's art installation.

=== Art Installation for PM Vishwakarma ===
Vibhor Sogani was commissioned to create an Aesthetic Creative Centrepiece for Yashobhoomi, IICC, Dwarka at the occasion of the launch of PM Vishwakarma Scheme, under the directive of MSME, Government of India.The launch of the scheme and Yashobhoomi was inaugurated by the Prime Minister of India, Narendra Modi on 17 September 2024. This installation was crafted under the stewardship of the National Gallery of Modern Art.

=== Bodhi Tree ===
Bodhi Tree is a 65 ft tall light-art installation created by Sogani for the world's second largest cruise ship, Royal Caribbean's Utopia of the Seas.

=== Peepal ===
Peepal is a site-specific installation by Vibhor Sogani, located at Tijara Fort Palace in Rajasthan. The space housing this installation has been named "Vibhor Mahal". It is inspired by the ancient Hindu reverence for the inverted banyan tree which has its roots upwards and branches down and whose leaves are vedic hymns.

=== Kalpavriksha ===
"Kalpavriksha – The Wish Fulfilling Tree" in Ahmedabad is a sculpture that reflects on themes of aspiration and prosperity. "Kalpavriksha" stands 35 feet tall and is crafted from mirror-finished steel balls. Highlighting a residential development in Gujarat, India, it aims to make the 100-feet roundabout, where it is situated, a visual focal point for the community.

=== Mahatma ===
Mahatma, art installation was executed by Vibhor Sogani with support of the Ministry of Culture, Government of India and the National Gallery of Modern Art, for the PARI (Public Art Project of India) initiative. Located at the Satyagraha Marg and MG road intersection in New Delhi, this stainless steel-sculpture draws inspiration from the life and legacy of Mahatma Gandhi, the father of the nation. It reflects on Gandhi's unwavering commitment to truth and self-righteousness.

== Exhibitions (Selected) ==
=== Images Unwind, India Habitat Centre, 2002 (Solo) ===
Sogani’s first solo exhibition, Images Unwind, took place in 2002 at the Visual Arts Gallery at the India Habitat Centre. The show garnered significant attention and acclaim, ultimately being awarded the Best Applied Art Show of the Year.

=== Mahatma in Me, 2015, 2016, 2017 (Solo) ===
In 2015, Sogani exhibited ‘Mahatma in Me’, a set of stainless steel installations, at the Mahatma Mandir in Gandhinagar. The sculptures were created as a tribute to Mahatma Gandhi. This exhibition was inaugurated by Chief Minister Smt Anandiben Patel to mark the 100 years of Mahatma’s return.

In 2016, the works were exhibited in Australia for Gandhi Jayanti & International Day of Non-Violence by the United Nations and received international recognition.

In August 2017, the works were displayed at the National Gallery of Zimbabwe, Harare. The exhibition was supported by the Government of India and the ICCR. It was a celebration of the 70th year of Indian independence and the Festival ‘India in the Sun Shine City’.

In December 2017, the works travelled to the National Museum, Dar es Salaam, Tanzania. The exhibition was supported by ICCR and the High Commission of India in Tanzania.

=== Chitrakavyam Ramayanam, 2024 ===
Sogani exhibited his works ‘Divine Walk’ and ‘Shankh Naad 'at the Chitrakavyam Ramayanam, an exhibition at the National Gallery of Modern Art, Mumbai and Delhi. The exhibition features artistic interpretations of the Ramayana.

=== Nebula, Dubai Design Week 2020 ===
Nebula utilises a multitude of mirror-finished stainless-steel spheres to create a large, suspended sculpture. The reflective nature of polished steel creates a dynamic interplay with the surrounding environment. Each individual sphere reflects a single perspective, a fragment of the whole. However, when viewed collectively, the reflections present a more unified image – a representation of the multifaceted nature of human identity. For this exhibit, Sogani collaborated with Wilson Associates and Studio Mark Lighting Consultants for Dubai Design Week 2020, D3, UAE.

=== Amsterdam Light Festival, Amsterdam (2023–25) ===
Pool of Dreams was created for the 12th edition of the Amsterdam Light Festival, held from 30 November 2023, to 21 January 2024. Among the 24 selected artists from eight countries, Sogani was the only Indian participant. It is, now, in the permanent portfolio of Light Art Collection, Amsterdam. Deepam,(2024–25) was commissioned as part of the city’s 750th anniversary celebrations, which commenced on 27 October 2024 and continued until 27 October 2025. Inspired by traditional oil lamps associated with the Indian festival of Diwali, the handcrafted brass installation featured floating lantern-like forms symbolising light, hope, and renewal.

=== God & I, 2008 (Solo) ===
In 2008, Vibhor Sogani presented his solo art exhibition, God & I, in New Delhi. Curated by Dr. Alka Pande, the exhibition was hosted at The Stainless Gallery.

=== Earth & Upon, 2014 (Solo) ===
In 2014, Sogani presented his solo art exhibition, Earth & Upon at the India Habitat Centre for Indian Society of Landscape Architects (ISOLA).

=== Light First, 2018 ===
An exhibition titled 'Light First' was held at the Italian ambassador's residence in November 2018 in New Delhi. Organised by iGuzzini in collaboration with the Italian Embassy, it featured the works of Vibhor Sogani along with some of India's distinguished lighting designers.

=== Moulded Magic, 2022 ===
In 2022, Sogani exhibited "Moulded Magic : Sculpture on a Bench" curated by Sushma Behl for the Chawla Art gallery. The book about the works, titled "Moulded Magic : Sculpture on a Bench" was unveiled at the India Art Fair 2022 by Amitabh Kant.

=== Silent Subtext, 2025 ===
The Art of Vibhor Sogani, London Design Biennale, Somerset House, London, United Kingdom (2025). Presented as part of the India Pavilion, the short film offered a meditative exploration of Sogani’s evolving body of work, philosophy, and the sensorial experience of art beyond the visual.

== Awards and honours ==
Sogani is the recipient of many notable awards and honours including the ‘Best Applied Art of the Year’ award by India Habitat Centre (2002); Best Exhibition Design Award for the DRDO Pavilion at Defexpo (2006); and ‘Best Lighting Designer of the Year’ at the Elle Decor International Design Awards (2008, 2011, and 2018). He also received the Gold Award at the Joburg Easter Festival, South Africa (2009); the title of ‘Indian Art Icon of the Year’ at Camera, Catwalk, Canvas, Singapore (2014); the Platinum Winner award at the GrandStand Awards, Acetech Mumbai (2015); the Best Decorative Wall Light Product of the Year Award for ‘Umbra’ at the Light Middle East Awards (2018); the IIID Design Excellence Award (2018); the IIID Design Excellence Honours by the Indian Institute of Interior Designers (2022); and the Lifetime Design Excellence Award by the World Design Organisation (2025). Sogani also served as a member of the governing body of the Indian Design Council from 2017 to 2020, following his nomination by the Government of India.

== Jury and Speaker Engagements ==
Vibhor Sogani has served as a juror for several prestigious events, including the Institute of Indian Interior Designers (IIID), Confederation of Indian Industry (CII), Indian Institute of Technology (IIT), Stainless Steel Innovation Awards (SIA), Eemax Global, and Auto Expo, Indian Design Mark 2019 (initiative in cooperation with the Good Design Award, Japan). He was also in the Grand Jury Panel for ‘Notions of India’ by TATA Structura, 2021.

Sogani has been invited as a key speaker and panellist at prominent conferences and talks at institutes such as National Institute of Design (NID), Ahmedabad, Sushant School of Art & Architecture, Indian Institute of Craft and Design (IICD), School of Planning and Architecture (SPA), National Institute of Fashion Technology (NIFT), IIT Guwahati, DesignxDesign and IIID conferences. He addressed audiences at the APSDA conference hosted by IIID in Goa (2012); ID Symposium (2017); Nine Dot Squares, Diggi Palace, Jaipur (2016).

In September 2018, he spoke on "Light and Art" at the Think Light conference at Light Middle East Dubai, UAE. He was also a speaker at New York Light Fair (2023) and Italian Design Day, Embassy of Italy, New Delhi (2023).

He has also participated as a speaker at several national and international design forums, including LightFair, New York, USA (2023); the Italian Cultural Centre at the Embassy of Italy; and the APSDA (Asia Pacific Space Designers Association) conference in Goa (2012). Several of his designs have also received Certificates of Registration of Design from The Patent Office.
