= Saurabh Singh Shekhawat =

Recipient of the Kirti Chakra award

Brigadier Saurabh Singh Shekhawat KC, SC, SM, VSM
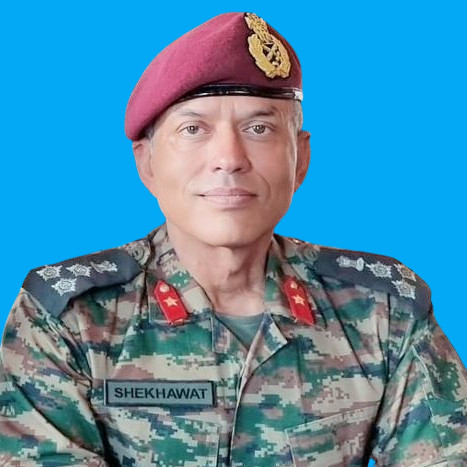
- Portrait of Brig Shekhawat
- Born: 18 October 1970 (age 56); Alwar, Rajasthan
- Alma mater: Indian Military Academy
- Military career
- Allegiance: India
- Branch: Indian Army
- Service years: 1994 – 2024
- Rank: Brigadier
- Service number: IC - 52871
- Units: 21 Para (SF); 17 Maratha LI
- Commands: 21 Para (SF)
- Conflicts: Operation Vijay
- Awards: Kirti Chakra; Shaurya Chakra; Sena Medal (Gallantry); Vishisht Seva Medal

Brigadier Saurabh Singh Shekhawat, KC, SC, SM, VSM is a former Indian Army officer of the 21 Para (SF) and an avid mountaineer. He is the Indian Army's most decorated officer, with one war-time gallantry award and two peace-time gallantry awards to his name.

== Early life ==
Shekhawat was born in a hindu Rajput family on 18 October 1970 in Alwar, Rajasthan. His father’s name is Jaswant Singh Shekhawat and mother's name is Shraddha Chauhan, a DLit and PhD.

== Career ==
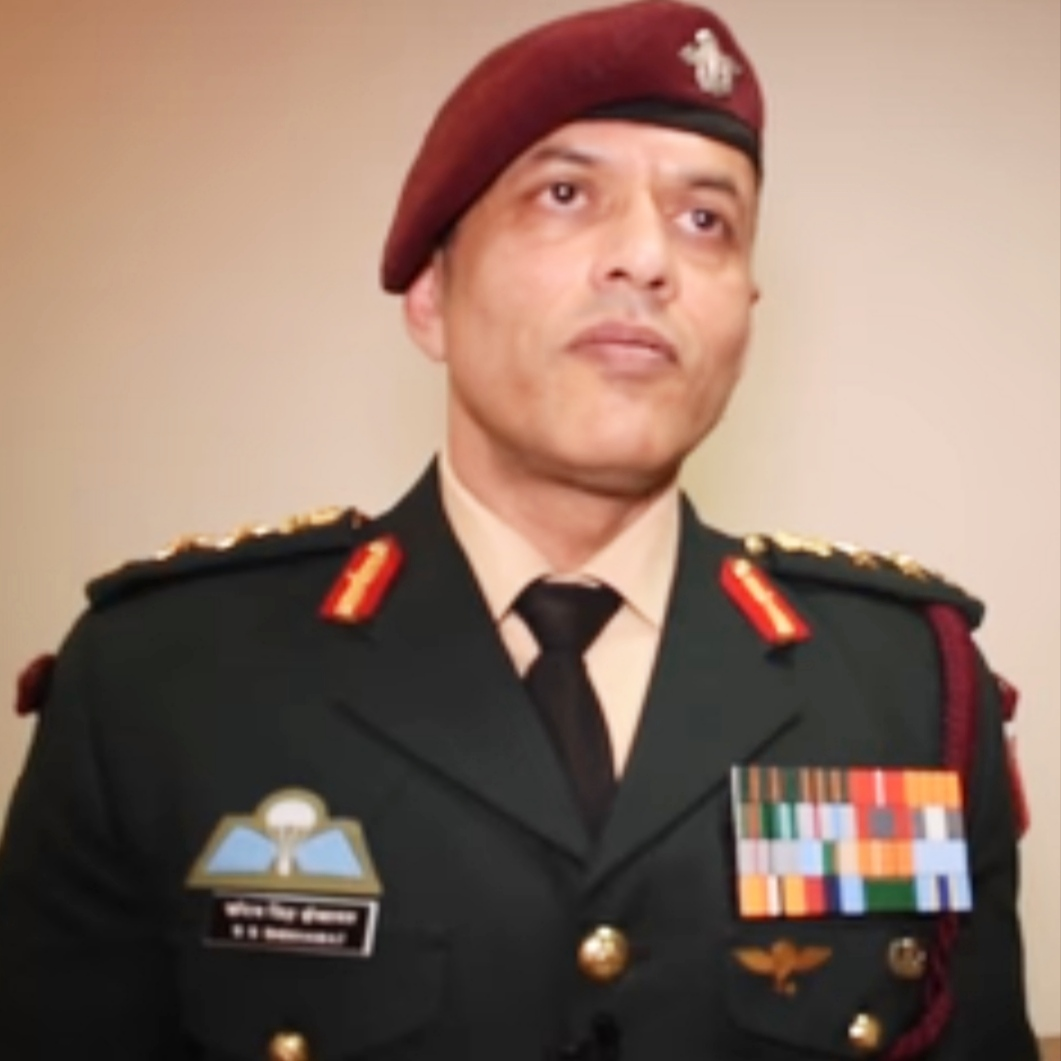
Colonel Shekhawat during an Interview

Military career

Shekhawat was commissioned in the 17th Battalion of the Maratha Light Infantry as a second lieutenant from Indian Military Academy, Dehradun, on 11 June 1994. Later he joined 21 Maratha Light Infantry which was being converted to 21 Para (SF). He was promoted lieutenant on 11 June 1996, captain on 11 June 1999 and major on 11 June 2004. He was promoted lieutenant colonel on 11 June 2007 and to colonel on 6 January 2010. He was promoted to the rank of Brigadier in March 2020.

Mountaineering Career

Shekhawat has ascended Mount Everest three times in 2001, 2003 and 2005. He has also climbed Kilimanjaro, the highest peak in Africa, and Mont Blanc, the highest peak in the Alps and Western Europe. In October 2009, he led the joint Indo-Kazakh team to scale the Kazakhstan peak of Marble Wall peak in Kazakhstan He has climbed 14 peaks in the world till date. On 23 June 2022, a 55 men Indian Army expedition team, led by Shekhawat, successfully scaled the climb to Shahi Kangri.

=== Shaurya Chakra Citation ===
The Shaurya Chakra citation reads as follows:

CITATION

CAPTAIN SAURABH SINGH SHEKHAWAT
IC-52871, 21ST BATTALION THE PARACHUTE REGIMENT (SPECIAL FORCES)
(Effective date of the award: 21 May 2001)

"Captain Saurabh Singh Shekhawat, a member of the Army Everest Expedition fell sick and had to be evacuated from the Everest region in the initial phase. He soon recovered and reached Base Camp. He reacclimatized and on 29 April 2001 rejoined his team at Camp III. The officer reached South Column on 21 May. On 22 May at 2200 hrs they were able to commence the summit attempt. Step by step he moved along the treacherous ridge helping and encouraging other team members. Fighting extremely adverse weather conditions they continued undaunted towards the summit. By 0645 hours his team reached the tough Hillary step. Not withstanding the cold, lack of oxygen, severe winds and recent illness the officer undauntedly helped his team mates over this most difficult stretch, braving treacherous knife edge ridges, extreme cold, lack of oxygen and high speed winds that threatened to blow them away. Inch by inch he went up using ropes and other equipment. The officer, somehow, kept motivating the other members to keep going and he successfully summitted Mount Everest at 0830 hours on 23 May 2001. Captain Saurabh Singh Shekhawat displayed gallantry against high risk extremes of weather and terrain conditions."

=== Kirti Chakra Citation ===
The Kirti Chakra citation reads as follows:

CITATION

LIEUTENANT COLONEL SAURABH SINGH SHEKHAWAT, SHAURYA CHAKRA, SENA MEDAL, VISHISHT SEVA MEDAL
IC-52871, 21ST BATTALION THE PARACHUTE REGIMENT (SPECIAL FORCES)
(Effective date of the award: 08 September, 2008)

"Within days of insertion in Manipur, Team Leader of 21 PARA (SF), Lieutenant Colonel Saurabh Singh Shekhawat established an innovative intelligence network to locate a terrorist camp in District Bishenpur, Manipur, hither-to-fore a terrorist sanctuary. After 45 days of continuous surveillance, planning and training he launched a historical operation to destroy the target and made national headlines. On night 08/09 September, 2008 guided by his surveillance detachment, the Team Leader successfully navigated boats/divers through weed infested waters and sited his groups in proximity to the target island without losing surprise. At daybreak, after successful sentry silencing, he along with assault group reached the island, swimming. However, surprise was lost and terrorists opened heavy fire. Without losing momentum and undaunted by hostile fire, the officer led his men in returning fire and tactically closed in. His accurate fire immediately killed two terrorists. Remaining terrorists, still in their huts, fired from behind cover. Concurrently, some terrorists fired heavy calibre weapons from a flank. This pinned down his men in the open. Seeing the precarious situation, the officer with his buddy, unfazed by flying bullets and unmindful of personal safety, exposed themselves to terrorist fire by running in the open. In the process he eliminated another terrorist and diverted their attention thus preventing casualty to own personnel. This galvanized remainder assault group to move and subsequently neutralise other terrorists. Lieutenant Colonel Saurabh Singh Shekhawat displayed resolute leadership, exemplary mission dedication, raw courage and presence of mind in close combat conditions in fighting the terrorists."

== Controversies ==
=== Victimization claim ===
In 2017, Shekhawat filed a complaint to the Ministry of Defence accusing two former army chiefs, Gen. Bikram Singh and Gen. Dalbir Singh, and a senior serving officer, Lt. Gen. Abhay Krishna of victimising him. Shekhawat claimed he was denied promotion because of lackluster reviews in annual confidential reports given to him as retaliation. Shekhawat claimed the trigger for the victimisation was his report made officially to the Army about a dacoity in Jorhat of a private citizen's residence involving personnel of the 3 Corps Counter Intelligence and Surveillance Unit in December 2011. At the time of the robbery, Gen. Dalbir Singh was then Commander of 3 Corps and Lt. Gen. Abhay Krishna was then Shekhawat's brigadier general staff (operations). Shekhawat claimed Krishna acted on Gen. Dalbir Singh's behalf to give him poor performance reviews. When Gen. Bikram Singh became Army Chief, the Discipline and Vigilance Ban imposed on Gen. Dalbir Singh by the previous Army Chief for inaction over the robbery was lifted and Gen. Dalbir Singh was further promoted.

Shekhawat also alleged that Gen. Dalbir Singh tried to harm his career by preventing him from taking the Higher Command Course, a qualification for promotion. But since the weightage for the course selection took into account medals and field service, he qualified for the course to the alleged chagrin of Gen. Dalbir Singh. Shekhawat speculated that Gen. Dalbir Singh in reaction was able to get weightage of medals and field service removed from consideration for higher command courses from 2014 onwards.

=== Dispute with The Week ===
On 14 March 2020, the current affairs magazine The Week published a story on Shekhawat titled 'decorated Colonel Saurabh Singh Shekhawat promoted after years of wait' regarding the claims by Shekhawat of victimization at the hands of senior officers. Shekhawat in response wrote a letter to The Week claiming the story was inaccurate and said such stories "hurt the sentiment" of soldiers who serve and create doubts in the minds of the general public about the Army. The reporter Pradip R. Sagar provided a rebuttal by pointing out the story was not meant to "cast aspersions" on the Army but highlight accusations made against top Army brass.

== Awards ==

	Kirti Chakra	Shaurya Chakra	
Sena Medal	Vishisht Seva Medal	Samanya Seva Medal	Operation Vijay Star
Special Service Medal	Siachen Glacier Medal	Operation Vijay Medal	Operation Parakram Medal
Sainya Seva Medal	High Altitude Service Medal	Videsh Seva Medal	75th Independence Anniversary Medal
50th Anniversary of Independence Medal	20 Years Long Service Medal	9 Years Long Service Medal	MONUSCO

Shekhawat has been awarded the Kirti Chakra, the Shaurya Chakra, Sena Medal (Gallantry), Vishisht Seva Medal and the Samanya Seva Medal amongst other medals for anti-terrorist operations, mountaineering and distinguished service. Shekhawat in a letter to Army headquarters in 2017 referred to himself as the "highest decorated serving officer in the army with an unblemished operational profile."

== Dates of ranks ==
Symbol	Rank	Service	Rank dates
	Second Lieutenant	Indian Army	11 June 1994
	Lieutenant	Indian Army	11 June 1996
	Captain	Indian Army	11 June 1999
	Major	Indian Army	11 June 2004
	Lieutenant Colonel	Indian Army	11 June 2007
	Colonel	Indian Army	6 January 2010 (Seniority from 1 January)
	Brigadier	Indian Army	March 2020

== Personal life ==
Shekhawat is married to Renuka Shekhawat, a professor of Sanskrit at Rajasthan University.

== See also ==
- Indian summiters of Mount Everest - Year wise
- List of Mount Everest summiters by number of times to the summit
- List of Mount Everest records of India
- List of Mount Everest records
