= Surendra Poonia =

Indian athlete Army officer

Major Surendra Poonia VSM

Personal information
- Nationality: Indian
- Born: 1 January 1977 (age 49) Rajpura, Rajasthan, India
- Education: Armed Forces Medical College, Pune; University of Pune; Jawahar Navodaya Vidyalaya

Sport

Personal details
- Party: Bharatiya Janata Party

Major Dr. Poonia with the President of India, 2008.

Major Dr. Surendra Poonia, VSM (born 1977) is an Indian sportsman, physician, and former Special Forces (PARA SF) Military Officer .

== Career ==
Poonia is an alumnus of the Armed Forces Medical College, Pune and Jawahar Navodaya Vidyalaya(JNV), Patan, Sikar, Rajasthan. He joined the Army Medical Corps in August 2001 and was a PARA (SF) Volunteer and was deployed with the 10th Batallion, Parachute Regiment (SF) or also known as the Desert Scorpions. He also served with The President's Bodyguard as a Regimental Medical Officer (RMO).

Poonia left the Indian Army in 2012 after attaining the rank of Major.

Poonia joined the Bharatiya Janata Party on 23 March before 2019 Lok Sabha General election.

== Achievements/Awards & Decorations ==
Poonia represented India in Croatia, Spain, Ireland and Turkey

On 26 January 2012, he received the Vishisht Seva Medal from the President of India.
