= Narharidas Barhath =

Indian writer and poet (1591–1676)

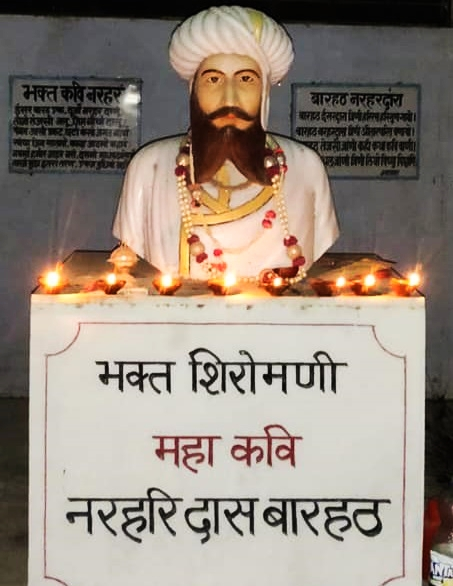
- 16th century saint-poet narharidas barhath
- Born: 1591 (VS 1648); Tehla village, Merta, Marwar, present-day Rajasthan, India
- Died: c. 1676 (VS 1733); Court of Jodhpur State, India
- Occupation: Poet
- Notable work: Avtar Charitra
- Father: Lakhaji Barhath

Narharidas Barhath was a Rajasthani poet of the medieval era, born in what is now the Indian state Rajasthan.

Barhath was born in 1591 (VS 1648) at Tehla village in Merta pargana of Marwar. His father Lakhaji Barhath, was a renowned poet of the 16th century in India.

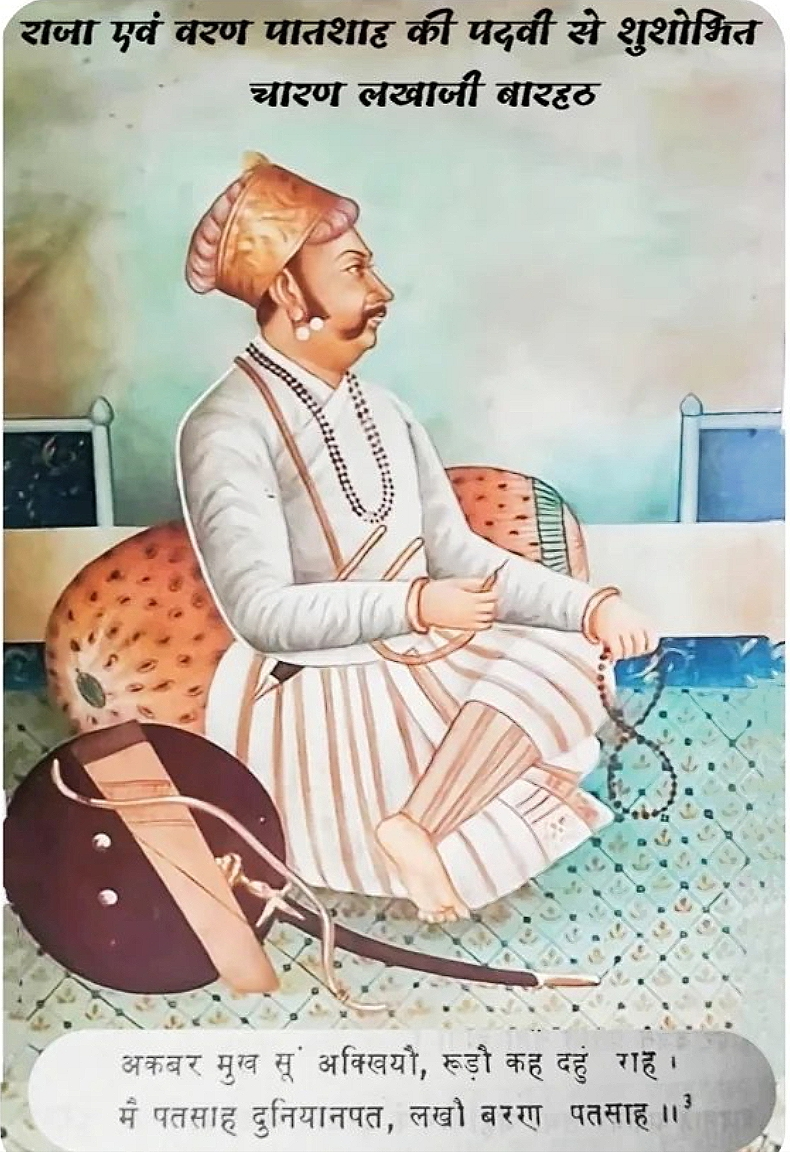
Portrait of lakhaji barhath

He was in the court of Jodhpur State king Gaj Singh I. He died there in about 1676 (VS 1733). He wrote Avtar Charitra. He had convinced Shah Jahan for banning cow slaughter in Mughal empire.
