= P. K. Sethi =

Indian surgeon (1927–2008)

Pramod Karan Sethi
- Born: 28 November 1927; Varanasi, India
- Died: 6 January 2008 (aged 80); Jaipur
- Other names: P. K. Sethi
- Occupations: orthopaedic surgeon, inventor
- Known for: Jaipur foot

Pramod Karan Sethi (28 November 1927 – 6 January 2008) was an Indian orthopaedic surgeon. With Ram Chandra Sharma, he co-invented the "Jaipur foot", an inexpensive and flexible artificial limb, in 1969.

He was awarded the Magsaysay Award for Community Leadership in 1981 and the Padma Shri by the Government of India in 1981.

== Personal life and career ==
Sethi was born at Varanasi (then Banaras), where his father Nihal Karan Sethi, himself a renowned scientist, was a physics professor at Banaras Hindu University. Sethi trained as a general surgeon at Agra under G. N. Vyas. In 1958, he specialised in orthopaedics, when the Sawai Man Singh Hospital in Jaipur where he worked needed an orthopaedics department because of a Medical Council of India inspection. He later cited his lack of qualifications in orthopaedics as an advantage in developing the Jaipur foot. Much of his practice was in physiotherapy, including the rehabilitation of amputees. He retired in 1981. He was the founder of MVSS.

He was married to Sulochana, and the couple had a son and three daughters. Sethi died of cardiac arrest in Jaipur, India.

== Jaipur foot ==
The Jaipur foot is made of rubber and wood and is probably the lowest cost prosthetic limb available in the world. The International Red Cross Committee has used it extensively in Afghanistan and other places to help amputees. Several injured soldiers in the Kargil war were benefited due to the Jaipur foot. Sethi was recognized by the Guinness Book of World Records for helping a large number of amputees in obtaining mobility again. The Indian dancer and actor Sudha Chandran was one of his patients.

Ram Chandra Sharma, an illiterate craftsman, is the co-inventor of the foot. The original idea of the Jaipur foot is supposed to have come to him serendipitously while he was riding a bicycle and had a flat tire.

== Awards ==
Sethi was awarded the Magsaysay Award for Community Leadership in 1981, the Padma Shri by the Government of India in 1981 and he also won a major Rotary International award. He was elected a fellow of the British Royal College of Surgeons.
