= Jasdev Singh =

Indian sports commentator (died 2018)

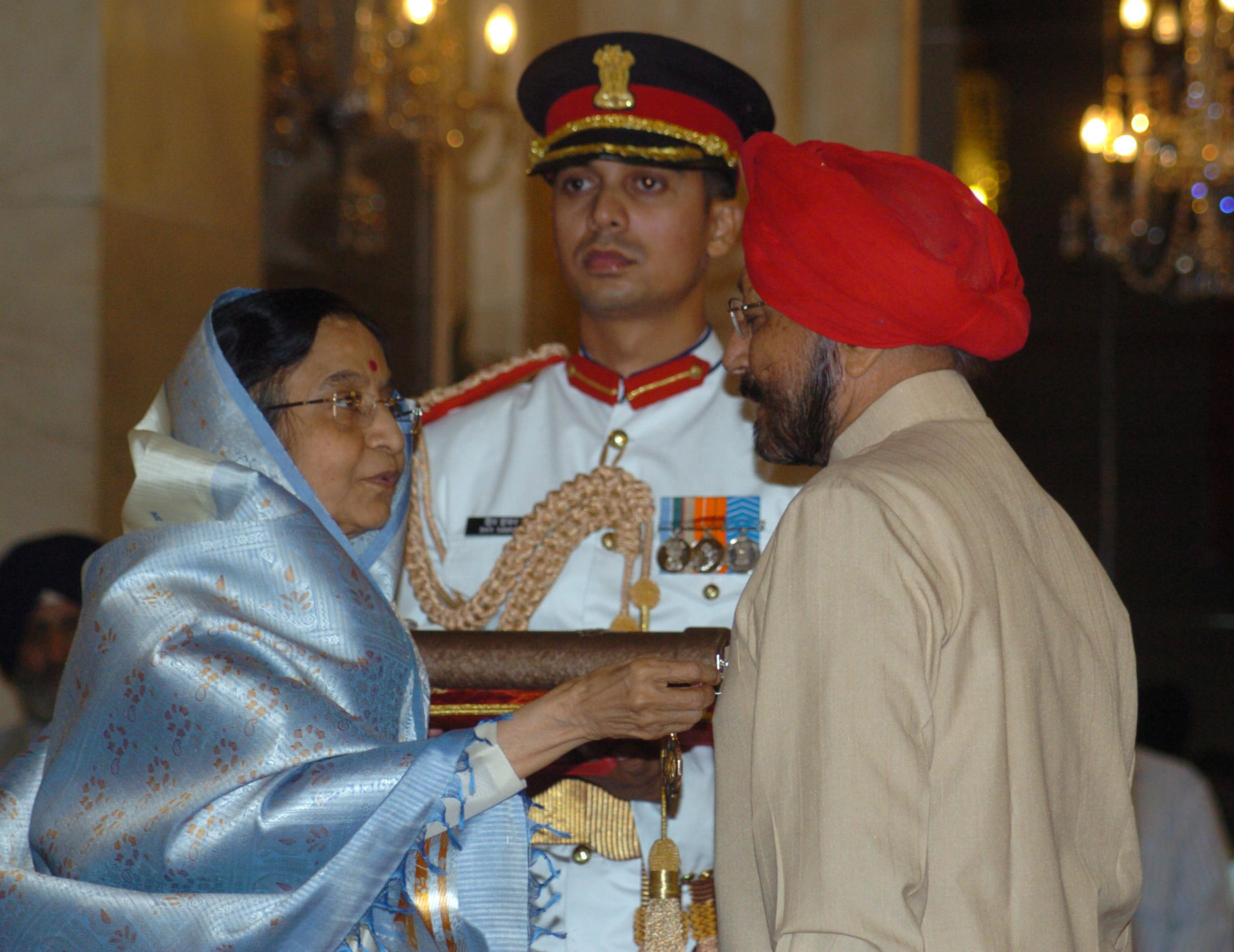
- The President, Pratibha Patil, presenting the Padma Bhushan award to Jasdev Singh at Rashtrapati Bhavan, in New Delhi on 10 May 2008
- Born: 1930/31
- Died: 25 September 2018
- Occupation: Sports commentator
- Employers: All India Radio Jaipur (1955–1963); * Doordarshan (1963–over 35 years)
- Known for: Coverage of nine Olympics, eight hockey World Cups, and six Asian Games
- Notable work: Official commentator on Independence Day and Republic Day parade broadcasts
- Awards: Padma Shri (1985); * Padma Bhushan (2008) * Olympic Order (awarded)

Jasdev Singh (1930/31 – 25 September 2018) was an Indian sports commentator. He was awarded Padma Shri in 1985 and Padma Bhushan in 2008. He died on 25 September 2018. He was also an official commentator on Independence Day, and Republic Day parade broadcasts from 1963 for state-run media, Doordarshan and also All India Radio. He joined All Indian Radio Jaipur in 1955, and moved to Delhi after eight years, thereafter he joined Doordarshan, where he worked for over 35 years.

Over the years, he covered nine Olympics, eight hockey World Cups and six Asian Games, and was awarded the Olympic Order, the highest award of the Olympic movement, by Juan Antonio Samaranch, IOC president.
