= Gokulbhai Bhatt =

Indian activist (1898–1986)

- Born: Gokulbhai Daulatram Bhatt; 19 February 1898; Hathal, Sirohi State
- Died: 6 October 1986 (aged 88); Rajasthan, India
- Occupations: Freedom fighter, social worker, politician
- Organization: Indian National Congress
- Known for: Praja Mandal movement in Sirohi, Indian independence movement
- Office: Chief Minister of Sirohi State
- Movement: Indian independence movement
- Awards: Padma Bhushan (1971); Jamnalal Bajaj Award (1982)

Gokulbhai Daulatram Bhatt (19 February 1898 – 6 October 1986) was a freedom fighter and a social worker from Rajasthan state in India. He was a member of Constituent Assembly of India representing Bombay State and chief minister of princely Sirohi state for a brief period. He was born in Hathal (Sirohi).

He along with seven others founded Praja Mandal at Sirohi on 22 January 1939 and was an active independence activist from Sirohi and was detained and put in jail for some time by British. After independence he opposed the division of Sirohi district and handover of Mount Abu to Gujarat. As a result of which Mount Abu remained part of Rajasthan, however, some other parts of district were transferred to Gujarat. He fought for empowerment of backward class

He was awarded Padma Bhushan award by the Government of India in 1971 and the Jamnalal Bajaj Award for Constructive Work in 1982.

He was arrested during the emergency for his vocal protest of emergency. In the jail he started satyagraha with other satyagrahis and people like Professor Kedar, Ujjwala Arora, Bhairon Singh Shekhawat and others. He was called as Gandhi of Rajasthan.
