= Abdul Vaheed "Kamal" =

Indian writer

- Born: 17 April 1936 (age 90); Narsara village, Churu district, Rajasthan, India
- Education: Northwestern Jackson College
- Occupation: Author

Abdul Vaheed (mononymously known as "Kamal") is a well-known author in the Rajasthani language.

== Personal life ==
He was born on 17 April 1936 in Narsara village of Churu district in Rajasthan. He has a MA and BED from Northwestern Jackson College. He is associated with many organizations like Lok Kala Kendra, Bikaner. He currently works in the education field.

== Works ==
In Rajasthani he wrote "Ukalti Dharti, Uphanto Abhoo" (Poetry), "Gali Ra Ladesar" (Rajasthani Novel for Children), "Tu Jani Ka Main Jani"(Rajathani Drama), "Gharanoo" Rajasthani Novel [Sahitya Akademi Awarded], "Howde Re Dhoro" (Rajasthani Novel for Children), "Rupali" (Rajasthani Novel), etc. while in Hindi he has written Desh ka Sipahi and Thandi Mitti, as well as Char Kot (Hindi Drama).

== Awards ==
He was awarded the Sahitya Akademi Award in 2001 for his Rajasthani novel Gharano, envisaging a harmony among different religions. The central plot element of the novel is the killing of a newborn girl in the feudal arrangement of Rajasthani society.

He has also won the Rajasthani Bhasha Sahitya Sanskriti Academy, Nehru Bal Sahitya Puraskar, Shivchand Bharatiya Puraskar, Mahendra Jajodiya Sahitya Puraskar and Allahajilaibal Mand Sansthan awards.
