= H S Ranka =

- Born: 3 November 1939 (age 86); Bhilwara, Rajasthan, India
- Education: Rajasthan University (1959)
- Occupation: Industrialist
- Known for: Founder and Chairman of Modern Group
- Awards: 'Udyog Patra' award (1978) by the Indian government; Silver Shield of the Rajasthan Financial Corporation (RFC) (1980)

H S Ranka or Hari Singh Ranka (born 3 November 1939) is an industrialist from Rajasthan state in India. He is the founder and chairman of Modern Group. Originally from the town of Bhilwara in Rajasthan, Ranka established Modern Woollens in 1973. Modern Group includes the companies Modern Threads, Modern Insulators, Modern Syntex, Modern Suitings, Modern Petrofill, Modern Petrochemicals and Modern Denim.

Ranka graduated from Rajasthan University in 1959.

Ranka received the Indian government's 'Udyog Patra' award in 1978 and the Silver Shield of the Rajasthan Financial Corporation (RFC) in 1980 for his contribution towards the industrialisation of Rajasthan.
