= D. R. Mehta =

Indian civil servant (born 1937)

D. R. Mehta (born 25 June 1937) is a former chairman of Securities and Exchange Board of India (SEBI). Mehta is a recipient of Padma Bhushan, one of the highest Indian civilian awards, for his contribution to social causes.

== Early life ==
Mehta was born at Jodhpur in Rajasthan. He is a graduate of arts and law from Rajasthan University. He also studied at Royal Institute of Public Administration, London, UK and the MIT Sloan School of Management.

== Career ==
D. R. Mehta joined the Indian Administrative Service in 1961 and held numerous positions initially in the Government of Rajasthan and later in the Government of India.

Mehta served as chairman of SEBI, the regulator of the capital markets in India, from 1995 to 2002. Mehta, unlike most bureaucrats, orchestrated significant transformations in the India's capital markets within a brief period by introducing a slew of economic reforms; eventually making the Indian capital market one of the most modern and efficient ones in the world, attracting both local and foreign investors.

From 1992 to 1995 Mehta served as the deputy governor of the Reserve Bank of India (RBI) which is the central bank of India. Still earlier, from 1991 to 1992 he was the director general of Foreign Trade, Government of India, and Ministry of Commerce. Prior to this, from 1989 to 1991, Mehta was additional secretary to the Government of India in the Ministry of Finance, dealing with banking.

From 1974 to 1989, except for five years when he was serving the Ministry of Finance of India, Mehta worked for the state government of Rajasthan in various senior positions as the secretary to the government, in the departments of Industries, Mines, and Special Programs of the Poor etc. During this period he was the secretary to the Chief Minister of Rajasthan.

== Social work ==
D. R. Mehta has been active in social field throughout his life. He set up Bhagwan Mahaveer Viklang Sahayata Samit (BMVSS) in Jaipur in 1975 and is now its full-time honorary volunteer. Under his leadership, BMVSS emerged as the largest organization for the handicapped in the world, providing artificial limbs/calipers and other aids and appliances for free. More than 1 million people have been its beneficiaries so far.

Mehta's focus on combining social service with science led to a memorandum of understanding between Stanford University and BMVSS, resulting in the development of a new knee joint called the Jaipur Knee. It was hailed by the Time magazine as one of the 50 best inventions of 2009.

Mehta is also a well-known animal activist. He has started and has been associated with some animal homes, and has also published literature on animal welfare.

== Awards and honours ==
D. R. Mehta has been honoured at national and international levels. In 2008 he was conferred with the Padma Bhushan by the President of India. Mehta received the TECH Museum Award for Innovation and Its Use for Humanity in Silicon Valley in November 2007. He is also a recipient of the Indian for Collective Action Award, Diwali Behan Award (conferred by the Dalai Lama), the CNBC Award for Social Enterprise, Satpal Mittal Award, etc. Mehta is also a director on the Europe / Asia Board of the U.S.-based MIT Sloan School of Management. D R Mehta was also a recipient of the Rajiv Gandhi National Sadbhavana Award in 2012. The award, which carries a citation and a cash award of Rs five lakh, has been given for his outstanding contribution towards promotion of communal harmony, peace and goodwill. In 2013 he was conferred with the Rajasthan Ratna by the Rajasthan Government.
