= Kuppalli =

Native place of poet Kuvempu

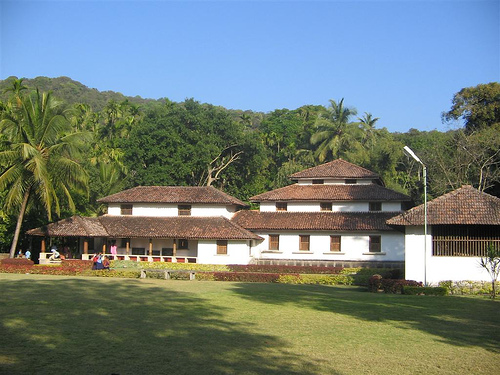

Kuppalli, also known as Kuppali, is a small village in Thirthahalli taluk of Shimoga district in the state of Karnataka in India. It is famous for being the childhood home of the renowned Kannada poet Kuvempu.

== Kuvempu ==
The celebrated Kannada poet and writer Kuvempu belonged to this village and was very attached to it. Indeed, this pen-name Kuvempu (Kannada: ಕುವೆಂಪು) pays homage to the author's home, created as it is from the first letters from his full name "Kuppali Venkatappa Puttappa" (Venkatappa being his father's name). Kuppalli is also the birthplace of Poornachandra Tejaswi, the son of Kuvempu and a famous Kannada writer himself. It is also the place where Kuvempu and Poornachandra Tejaswi have been cremated. The childhood home of Kuvempu at Kuppali has been converted into a museum by Rashtrakavi Kuvempu Pratishtana (a trust dedicated to Kuvempu). This trust has undertaken immense developmental works in Kuppali to showcase Kuvempu and his works to the external world.

=== Kuvempu's early life and education ===
Kuvempu was born in Hirekodige, Koppa taluk, of Chikmagalur district to a native Kannada family. He was brought up in Kuppalli. His education started at his home by an appointed teacher from Dakshina Kannada. He joined Anglo Vernacular school in Thirthahalli to continue his middle school education. He lost his father, Venkatappa Gowda, when he was only 12. Kuvempu finished his lower and secondary education in Kannada and English in Thirthahalli. He moved to Mysore for further education and completed his high school from Wesleyan High School. He pursued his college studies in Maharaja's College of Mysore, and graduated in 1929 with a major in Kannada.

=== Kavishaila ===
Kavishaila - Rock monument dedicated to Kuvempu

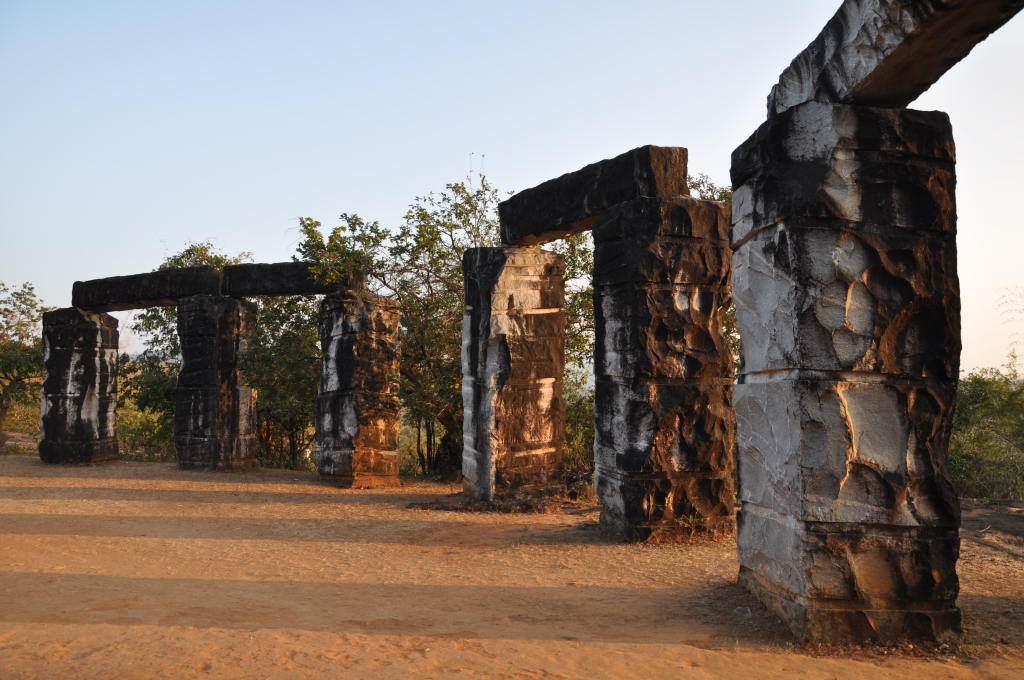
Kavishaila by evening

Kavishaila is a rock monument made of megalithic rocks and dedicated to Kuvempu. It is on the top of a small hill in Kuppali. Arranged in a circular fashion, the rocks have been placed to resemble the Stonehenge in England. At the centre of this rock monument is the place where Kuvempu was laid to rest after his death and a memorial has been constructed at that location. Near this monument, is a small rock where Kuvempu used to sit and discuss about literature and other topics with his other litterateur friends. A rock containing the etched signatures of Kuvempu, B. M. Srikantaiah and T S Venkannaiah is present near the monument. Poornachandra Tejaswi later engraved his signature on the same rock. Granite slabs containing engraved poems and quotes of Kuvempu have been placed near the monument.

=== Digitization ===
A 3D reconstructed digitized model of Kavisamadhi and etched signatures are developed by Axesmap under #DigitalHeritage program.

=== Kavimane ===
Granite slab containing one of Kuvempu's famous poems near Kavishaila

Slab indicating the lifetime of Kuvempu near Kavishaila

Rock containing the engraved signatures near Kavishaila

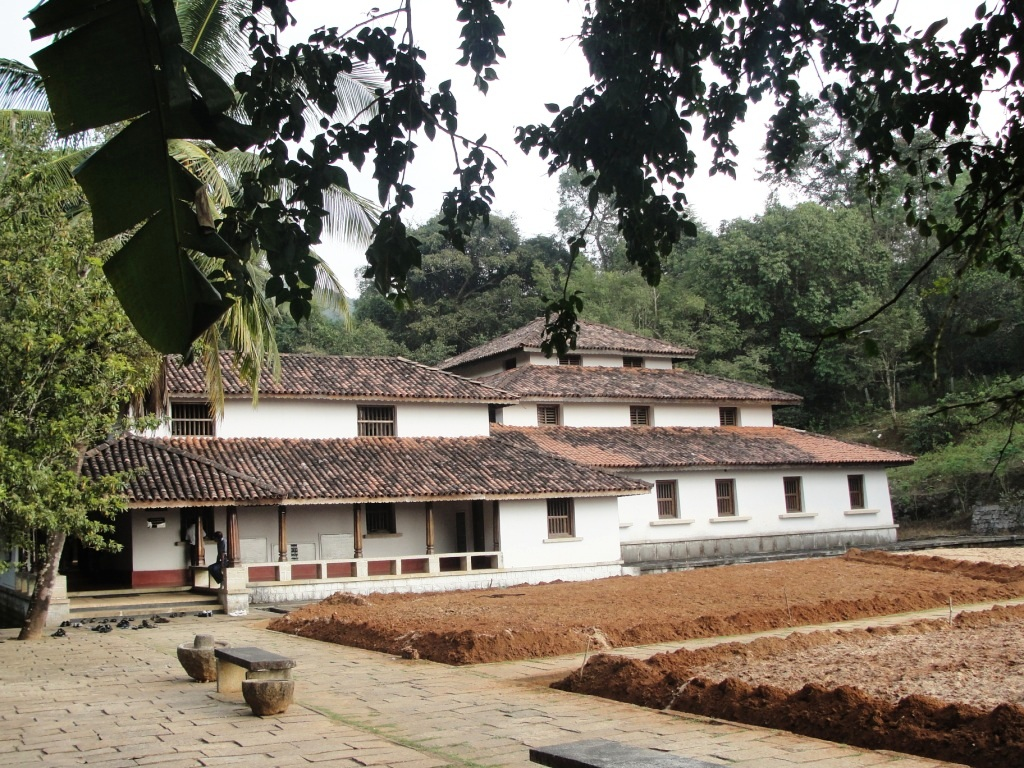
Kuvempu's house now a museum

Kuvempu's memorial in Kavishaila

Kavimane is the ancestral house of Kuvempu. Kavimane means House of the poet in the Kannada language. Nestled in the midst of green forests of Malnad, the house presents a scintillating view. It is a three-storeyed tiled house including the ground floor and is the house where Kuvempu spent most of his childhood. This house has now been renovated and converted into a museum. The architecture of the house is what is locally called thotti Mane, in which the house consists of a central square area resembling a thotti (pond) that is open to sky and surrounded by a courtyard. This house is open on all days of the year from 9:00 AM to 6:30 PM. There is an entry fee of 20 Rupees for adults and for children over the age of 10. Photography inside Kavimane is prohibited.

- Ground floor: As one enters the house, one can see a big hall with various articles displayed in the courtyard. Prominent among them is the mantapa within which Kuvempu's marriage was solemnised. Next to the Mantapa is the laminated Lagnapatrike, the invitation card used for inviting guests to Kuvempu's marriage. Large wooden boxes used for storing rice and other grains can also be seen in the main hall. Next to the hall, is the baananti Kone, which is a room dedicated for caretaking of mothers who have just given birth to a child. A wooden tottilu (cradle) used for putting the baby to sleep is a rare item present there. The kitchen is a revelation in itself and consists of utensils and other articles hardly seen in kitchens today. Some of the items include a big kadigolu, a ladle-like utensil used for churning curd into buttermilk, a sarigolu which is a steam pot used for making idlis and a sambar marriage which is a box containing various compartments used to hold items that make a sambar. An interesting innovation in the kitchen is that of a hoge atta, which is an opening in the roof used to let out smoke generated by firewood in the kitchen. The hoge atta is made of wood with openings to let out smoke. Since Malnad region is a high moisture area, there are good chances that perishable food items will not stay for long. These items are placed on the hoge atta so that the smoke can prevent moisture from destroying these items. Another room contains a lot of photographs taken of Kuvempu's childhood and also of important events in his lifetime. A small room serves a shop where one can purchase books authored by Kuvempu and cassettes and CDs based on his work. A 10% discount is provided over the actual price of the items purchased here.
- First floor: The first floor can be reached by a wooden staircase and consists of a room that contains the various articles used by Kuvempu during his lifetime like his pen, razor, comb, walking stick, umbrella etc. Various awards and citations conferred to him are also present; the prominent among which are the Padma Bhushan, Padma Vibhushan and the huge Karnataka Ratna awards. Some of the other articles that can be seen here are a taalapatra (writings on palm leaf) and baluvali suttuga, which is a huge wooden stick like item given to the groom as a gift during his wedding.
- Second floor: The second floor houses the entire collection of books written by Kuvempu, including one of Sri Ramayana Darshanam, probably his most famous book, which he reverently dedicated to Shri TS Venkannaiah, his teacher, published in his own handwriting. Laminated doctorate certificates conferred by various universities to Kuvempu can also be seen here.
