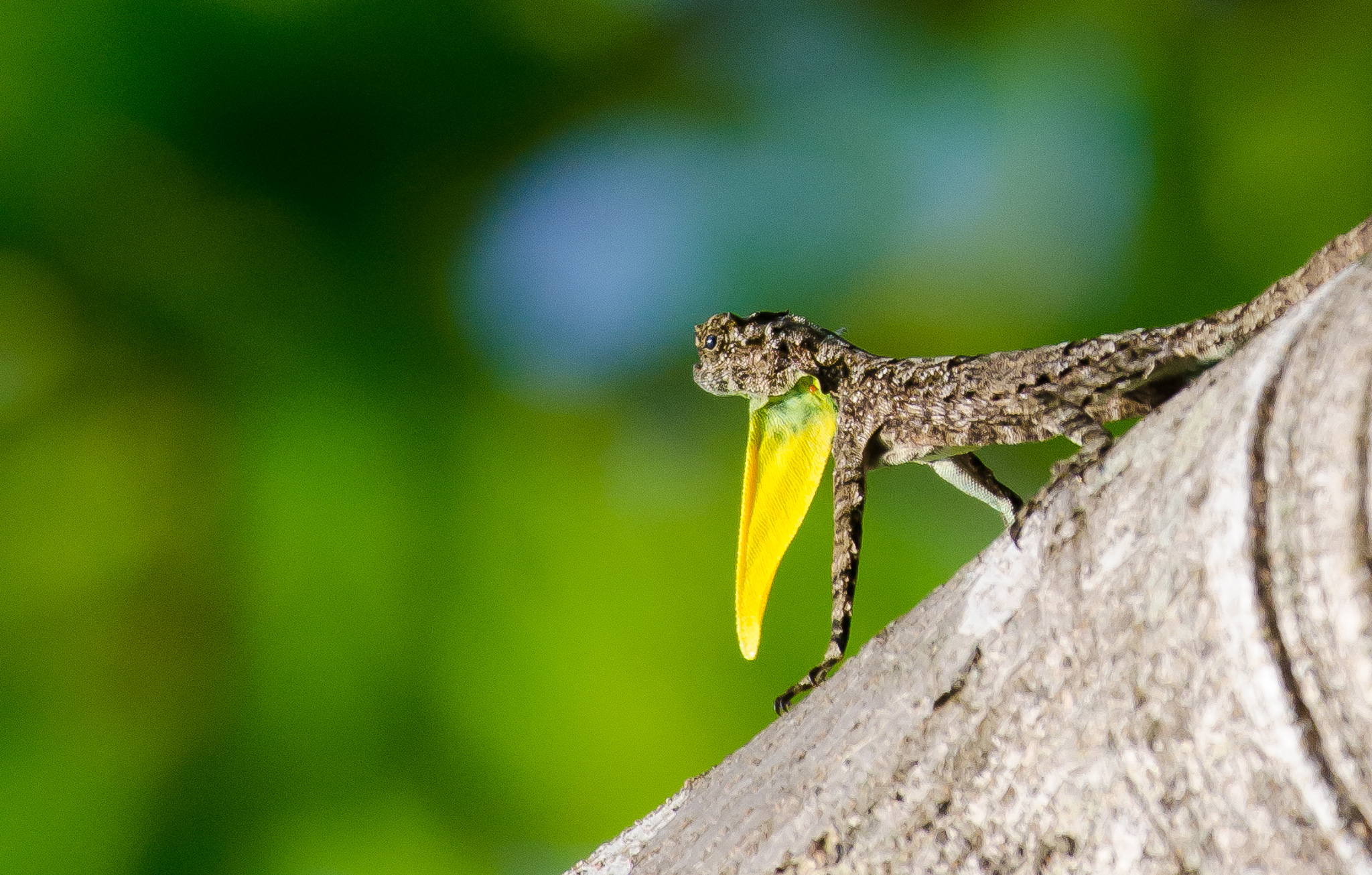
- A male with a long yellow dewlap that is rapidly flicked forward in display
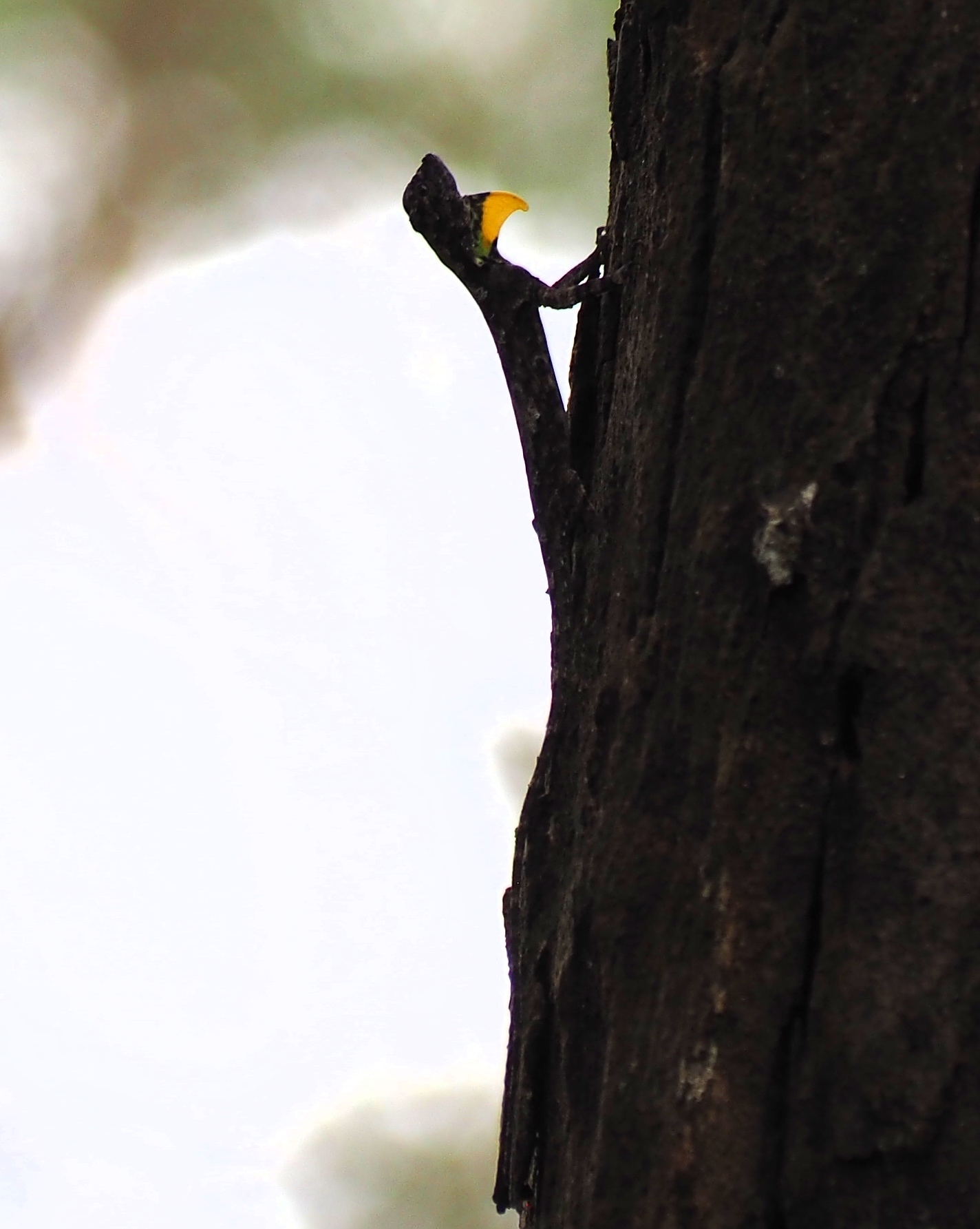

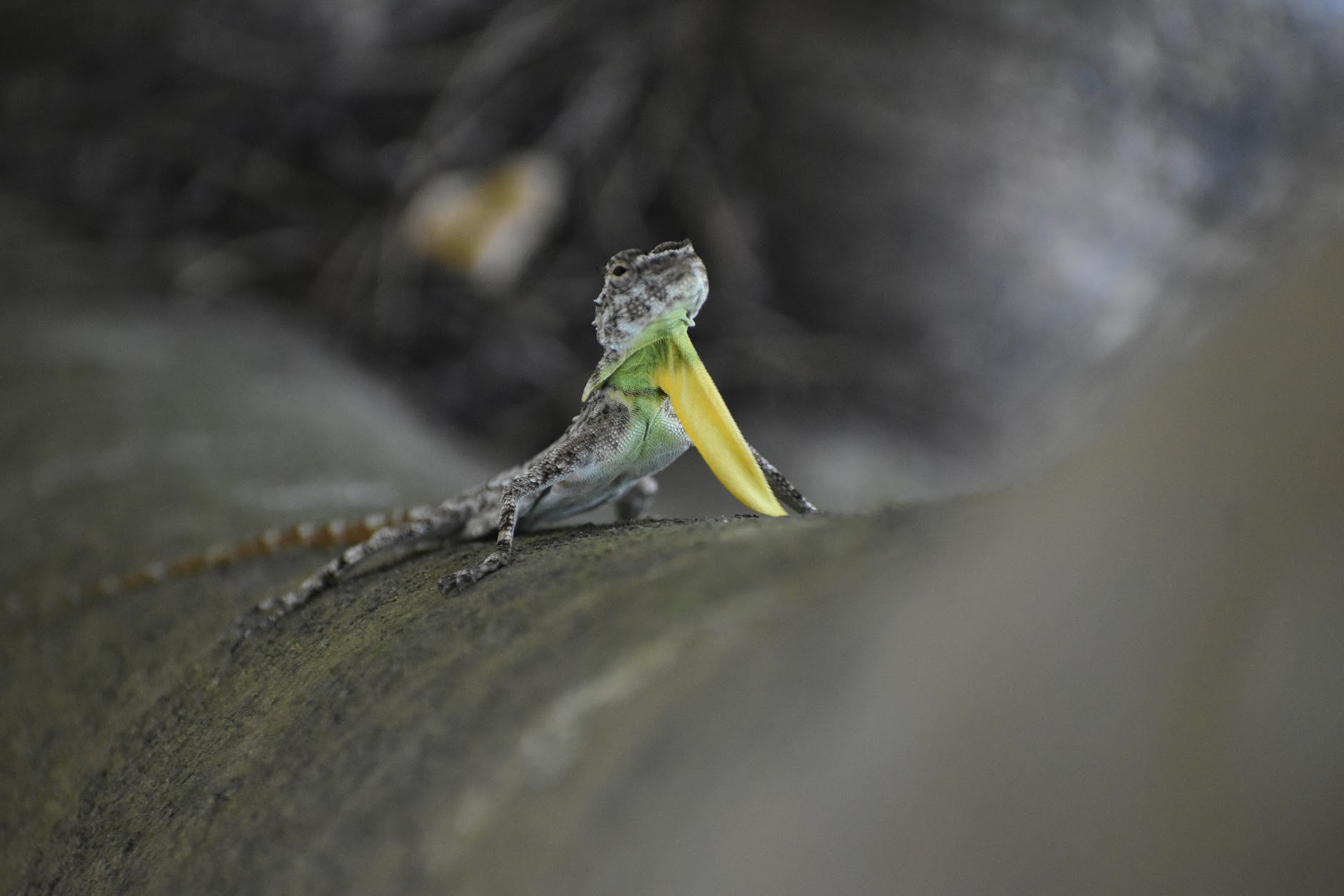
- A Draco dussumieri female with a relatively smaller dewlap Frontal view of a male, photographed at Wayanad, India.

Conservation status
- Least Concern (IUCN 3.1)

Scientific classification
- Kingdom: Animalia
- Phylum: Chordata
- Class: Reptilia
- Order: Squamata
- Suborder: Iguania
- Family: Agamidae
- Genus: Draco
- Species: D. dussumieri

Binomial name
- Draco dussumieri A.M.C. Duméril & Bibron, 1837
- Draco dussumieri range in relation to the ranges of a few other Draco species

= Draco dussumieri =

Species of lizard

Draco dussumieri, also known commonly as the Indian flying lizard, the southern flying lizard, and the Western Ghats flying lizard, is a species of lizard in the family Agamidae. The species is capable of gliding from tree to tree. It is found principally in the Western Ghats and some other hill forests of Southern India. It is almost completely arboreal, found on trees in forests and adjoining palm plantations where it climbs trees to forage for insects and glides to adjoining trees by expanding the patagium, loose skin on the sides of the body which is supported by elongated ribs to act as wings. The skin on the sides of the neck is also extended to the sides using the hyoid bones of the tongue as support. During the breeding season males maintain small territories which they defend from other males while courting females. The male has a more colourful patagium than the female, and it prominently extends its yellow dewlap forward in display. Although living almost its entire life in trees, the female descends to the ground to lay eggs in soil. This is the species with the westernmost distribution within the genus Draco, the majority of species occurring in Southeast Asia.

== Description ==
The colour and pattern of the body matches tree trunks, and they use their dewlaps to communicate with each other

The southern flying lizard is brown with patches of grey that match the pattern of tree bark. It can change its colour to a limited extent. As an adult, it has a total length of about 23 cm (9.1 in), with a snout-to-vent length (SVL) of about 7–9 cm (2.8–3.5 in) and a tail length of 10–13 cm (3.9–5.1 in). The head is round with a short snout, and the nostrils point upwards. It is active during the day after it has warmed up in the early morning sun. Males have a long yellow dewlap which is shorter in the females. This lizard climbs trees in search of insect prey on the trunks and leaps off when it reaches the top to land on adjoining trees. It is able to glide by extending its patagia, flaps of skin on both sides of the body that are supported by six elongated ribs with special musculature to extend them outwards. The muscles on the breast are also modified to breathe more efficiently and support its active lifestyle. In addition the sides of the neck are also stretched out to form a pair of smaller "wings" around the head. It is able to control the direction of the glide using its tail. The patagium is patterned on the underside with black blotches on yellow and purple. Patterns vary individually and these marking have been used to identify and estimate population sizes. A horn-like, conical tubercle behind and above the posterior part of the eye is prominent. Males have a small crest arising on the nape. The yellow gular sac on the throat is long and narrow, longer in the male. The back is rough and the throat has irregular brown spots. In addition to the patagium, the hyoid apparatus (part of the tongue) expands throat lappets horizontally so that the head is also supported on its sides by small wing-like structures.

== Taxonomy and etymology ==
The species Draco dussumieri was first described as le dragon de Dussumier by André Marie Constant Duméril and Gabriel Bibron, who described it in 1837 in the fourth volume of their catalogue of the reptiles of the world. The specific name, dussumieri, is in honor of Jean-Jacques Dussumier, a French voyager who collected zoological specimens in India. Draco is the Greek word for dragon.

D. dussumieri is the only species of Draco found in southern India and is the westernmost representative out of around 42 species in the genus. This species stands out as the sole member of a lineage that represents an old branch from the common ancestor of the species within the genus. One study failed to locate the appropriate mitochondrial sequence for comparison with other species.

== Distribution ==
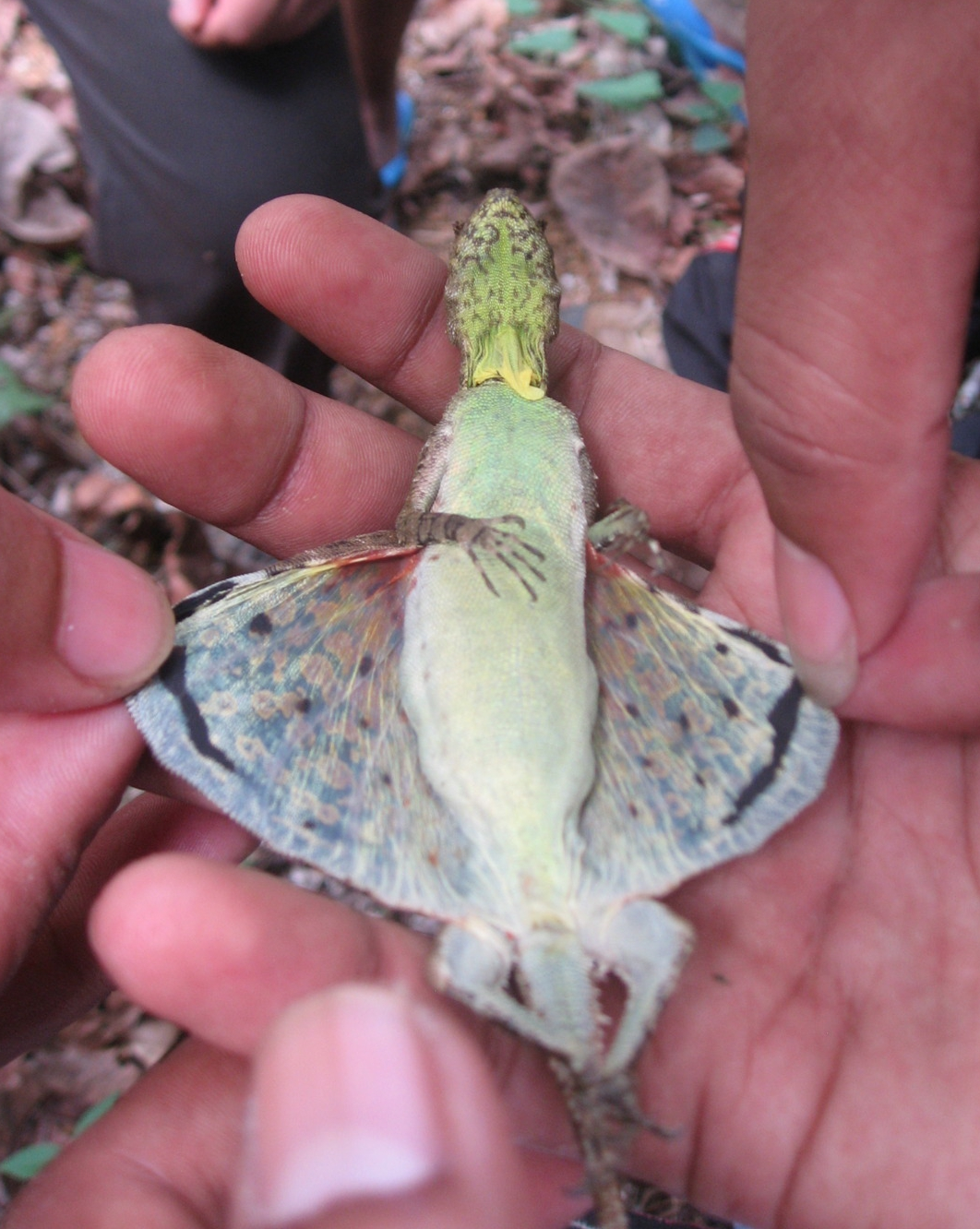
Underside of a female showing the "wing" or patagium that is usually supported by six elongated ribs. The dewlap is short, and the patterning on the patagium is not very contrasting in females.

D. dussumieri is found principally along the Western Ghats and associated hill forests of Karnataka, Kerala, Tamil Nadu, Goa, Maharashtra southern India. It is also reported from some parts of Eastern Ghats (Talakona) in Andhra Pradesh Nelson Annandale recorded it as "common about ten miles north of Trivandrum, but apparently very local." It is often found in coconut and betel-nut plantations near forests.

== Behaviour and ecology ==
Takeoff and initial stages of gliding in D. dussumieri, slowed down 10x, showing the attachment of the forelimbs to the gliding membrane

The southern flying lizard feeds on insects. It is strictly diurnal and sleeps at night on flat surfaces. Specimens from northern Karnataka were found to feed on a large number of ants (Oecophylla smaragdina). Males display actively from February to April in Kerala, mainly in the forenoon after the sun warms them up. Males maintain small territories and bob their head and erect the gular pouch when they spot females nearby. The male can change its skin colour to become silvery grey and conspicuous before gliding towards the female. It leaps off with its hind legs making use of specially adapted musculature at the base of the tail before spreading the patagium. The forelimbs are attached to the patagium during the gliding flight and released just before landing. During the heat of the day in summer it rests in the cooler canopy and becomes active again in the late afternoon. During cooler weather, it basks. Males chase females and court them with ritualized moves. The male mounts the female and bites the nape during copulation. Males intimidate intruding males by expanding and folding their patagium and making conspicuous movements. This lizard is almost entirely arboreal. Females descend to the ground to lay eggs in soil during the monsoons. About four eggs are laid which hatch after fifty days or so.

In a population estimate made in an areca plantation in the Western Ghats, the density was found to be about 13 per hectare. The population density was much lower, less than 2 per hectare, at Valparai which is at a higher altitude.

The southern flying lizard has many predators including arboreal snakes and birds. Two species of bird that have been observed to feed on them include the Indian golden oriole and the black-capped kingfisher. Lion-tailed macaques have been noted to feed on them as well.

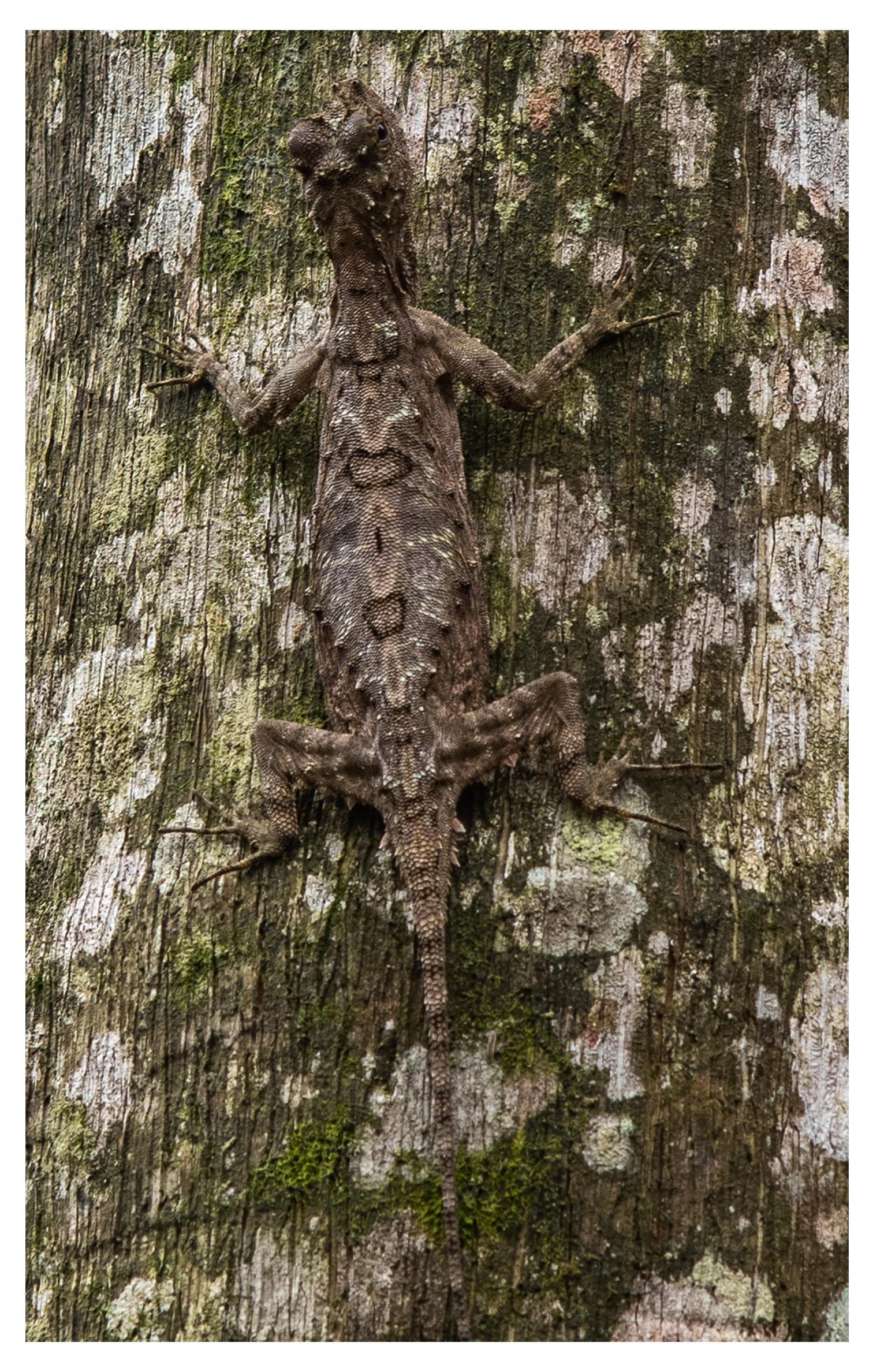
Southern flying lizard, at Pandalur, The Nilgiris, Tamil Nadu

== In fiction ==
Draco dussumieri features prominently in a fictional work or novel named Carvalho (ಕರ್ವಾಲೊ) in Kannada written by Poornachandra Tejaswi. In this story, Carvalho (ಕರ್ವಾಲೊ), a middle-aged scientist searches for this flying lizard in the forests of the Western Ghats in the state of Karnataka India.
