= Kanuru Heggaditi =

1937 novel by Kuvempu

- Cover of the novel
- Author: Kuvempu
- Language: Kannada
- Published: 1937
- Publication place: India
- Media type: Print (Hardcover)

Kanuru Heggaditi or Kanooru Heggadithi (meaning: Proprietress of Kanuru) is a Kannada language novel written by author and poet, Kuvempu, in 1936. Based on the novel, a Kannada movie Kanooru Heggadithi directed by Girish Karnad, was released in 1999.

== See also ==
- Chikmagalur, an area relating to the article
- Sri Ramayana Darshanam, an epic written by Kuvempu
- Malegalalli madumagalu, a novel written by Kuvempu
- Kannada literature
- Kannada poetry
- Rashtrakavi (meaning: National poet), a list of poets with the title
