= Mai Amar Shahido ka Charan =

Hindi poem

"I'm a Charan of Immortal Martyrs" (Note: Hindi: मैं अमर शहीदों का चारण, romanized: Maiñ Amar Shahīdoñ ka Cāraṇ, pronounced [mɛ̃ˑ ˈɐmɐɾ ʃɐˈɦiːdõˑ kaˑ ˈtʃaːɾɐɳ]) is a poem written in Hindi by Srikrishna Saral.

== Sample text ==
Every stanza in the poem ends with the couplet Maiñ amar shadīdoñ ka cāraṇ unke guṇ gāya karta huñ ('I sing the praises of the immortal martyrs'). Using very simple language, Saral articulates India's revolutionaries, the freedom movement and patriotic ferver with his work and reminds the new generation of the country the virtue of the freedom struggle and the martyrs associated with it.

Hindi

मैं अमर शहीदों का चारण
उनके गुण गाया करता हूँ
जो कर्ज राष्ट्र ने खाया है,
मैं उसे चुकाया करता हूँ।

Romanization

Maiñ amar shadīdoñ ka cāraṇ,
Unke guṇ gāya karta huñ.
Jo karj rāṣṭr ne khāya hai,
Maiñ use cukāya karta huñ.

IPA

[mɛ̃ˑ ˈɐ̃.mɐɾ ʃɐ.ˈɦiː.d̪õˑ ka̠ˑ ˈt͡ʃa̠ː.ɾɐ̃ɳ |]
[ˈʊ̃ŋ.keˑ ɡʊ̃ɳ ˈɡa̠ː.ja̠ˑ ˈkɐɾ.t̪a̠ˑ ɦũˑ ‖]
[d͡ʒoː kɐɾd͡ʒ ˈra̠ːʂ.ʈɾ̩̊ neˑ ˈkʰa̠ː.ja̠ˑ ɦɛˑ |]
[mɛ̃ˑ ˈʊ.seˑ ˈt͡ʃʊ.ka̠ˑ.ja̠ˑ ˈkɐɾ.t̪a̠ˑ ɦũˑ ‖]

English

I'm a Charan of immortal martyrs,
I sing their praises.
The debt the nation hath incurred,
I repay the same debt.
