= Shrikrishna Saral =

Hindi poet (1919-2000)

Shri Krishna Saral (1 January 1919 – 2 September 2000) was an Indian poet and writer. Most of his works are about Indian revolutionaries, 15 of which are mahakavyas (epics). He is hailed as a 'Yug-Charan' for his nationalist poetry reminiscent of the sacrificial traditions of Indian soldiers. "Mai Amar Shahido ka Charan" composed by him is a very popular Hindi language poem.

Sahitya Akademi of Madhya Pradesh confers the annual "Shri Krishna Saral Award" for poetry.

== Biography ==
Shri Krishna Saral was born on 1 January 1919 in Ashok Nagar in Guna district of Madhya Pradesh. His father's name was Shri Bhagwati Prasad and mother's name was Yamuna Devi. Saral worked as a Professor in Government School of Education, Ujjain. He was involved with Indian revolutionaries and after retiring from the post of teacher, he remained engaged in literature. He was decorated by various organizations with 'Bharat Gaurav', 'National Poet', 'Kranti-Kavi', 'Kranti-Ratna', 'Abhinav-Bhushan', 'Manav-Ratna', 'Best Kala-Acharya' etc.

He was inspired by Rajarshi Purushottamdas Tandon, and remained in contact with Vidyavati ji, mother of Shaheed Bhagat Singh, and was close to prominent revolutionaries, whom he made the subject of his literary activities. He called himself 'Shahido ka Charan' or 'Charan of the martyrs'. Well-known litterateur Pt. Banarsidas Chaturvedi stated that- 'Shri Saral has done proper Shradh of Indian martyrs.' The great revolutionary Pt Parmanand has said – 'Saral is a living martyr'.

In the latter part of his life, Saral was influenced by religion and spirituality and wrote three epics – Tulsi Manas, Saral Ramayana and Sitayan. Saral authored and published 124 texts including 15 epics, and had himself sold 500,000 copies of his works. He traveled to 10 countries with his own expenses for his research the India revolutionaries. To meet the expenses, Saral even sold his personal immovable property and wife's jewellery. Over the course of his life, he suffered five heart attacks.

Saral died on 2 September 2000.

== Works ==
Saral has penned a total of 124 texts. For the compilation of facts on Netaji Subhash, he himself traveled twelve countries where Netaji and his army had fought for the freedom of India.

He wrote a book called 'Krantikari Kosh', in which he presented the history of the Indian independence movement. It is published in five different parts.

- Krantikari Kosh 1
- Krantikari Kosh 2
- Krantikari Kosh 3
- Krantikari Kosh 4
- Krantikari Kosh 5
- Mahavali
- Itihas-Purush Subhash
- Jai Hind

Novels:- Sun of Chattagaon, Chandrashekhar Azad, Rajguru, Jai Hind, Dusara Himalaya, Yatindranath Das, Badha Jatin, Ramprasad Bismil.

Essay-Collection:-Anamola Vachana, Jiyo to aise jiyo, Yuvakom se do-do batem, Vichara aura Vicharaka, Jivana-Rahasya, Meri Srijana-Yatra.

Epics:- Chandrashekhar Azad, Sardar Bhagat Singh, Subhash Chandra, Bagi Kartar, Shaheed Ashfaq Ulla Khan, Kanti Jwalkama, Ambedkar Darshan, Swarajya Tilak, Vivek Shree, Jai Subhash.

Poetry Collection:- Kiran Kusum, Kavya Geeta, Rashtra-Veena, Saral Dohavali, Kranti Ganga, Sral Mahakavya Granthavali, Jaihind Ghazale, Saral Muktak, Inquilabi Ghazale, Quami Ghazale, Bagi Ghazale, Shaheed Ghazale, Jivant Ahuti, Shringar Geet, Shahido ki Kavya Gathaen, Rshtra ki Chinta, Kavya Kathanak, Vivekanjali, Rashtra Bharati, Rakta Ganga, Kavya Mukta, Maut ke Ansu, Bharat ka Khoon Ubalta hai, Maharani Ahilyabai, Adbhut Kavi Sammelan, Watan Hamara, Head Masterji ka pajama, Mujhko yah Dharti Pyari Hai, Kavya Kusum, Sneha Saurabh, Bachhon ki Phulwari, Smriti-Puja, Bapu-Smriti-Granth, Kavi aur Sainik, Mukti-Gaan.

Memoirs: – Krantikariyon ki Garjana

Miscellaneous:-

Sanskriti ke aloka stambha, Sansara ki prachina sabhyataem, Hindi jnana prabhakara, Desha ke divane, Shikshavid subhasha, Sansara ki mahana atmaem, Krantikari shahidom ki sansnritiyam, Subhasha ki rajanaitika bhavishyavaniyam, Netaji subhasha darshana, Netaji ke sapanom ka bharata, Kulapati subhasha, Desha ke prahari, Senadhyaksha subhasha, Krantivira, Desha ke dulare, Ajivana krantikari, Shahidom ki kahaniyam, Rashtrapati subhashachandra bosa, Balidana gathaem, Shahida-chitravali, Kranti-kathaem, Subhasha ya gandhi, Kranti itihasa ki samiksha, Rani chenamma, Netaji subhasha jarmani mem, Krantikari andolana ke manoranjaka prasanga, Nara-nahara naragundakara, Alluri sitarama raju, Rasabihari bosa, Dr. Champakaramana pillai, Chidambaram pille, Padmanama ayangara, Vasudeva balavanta phadake, Baba prithvisinha ajada, Karatarasinha saraba, Krantikarini durga bhabhi, Subramanyama shiva, Banchi ayyara.
