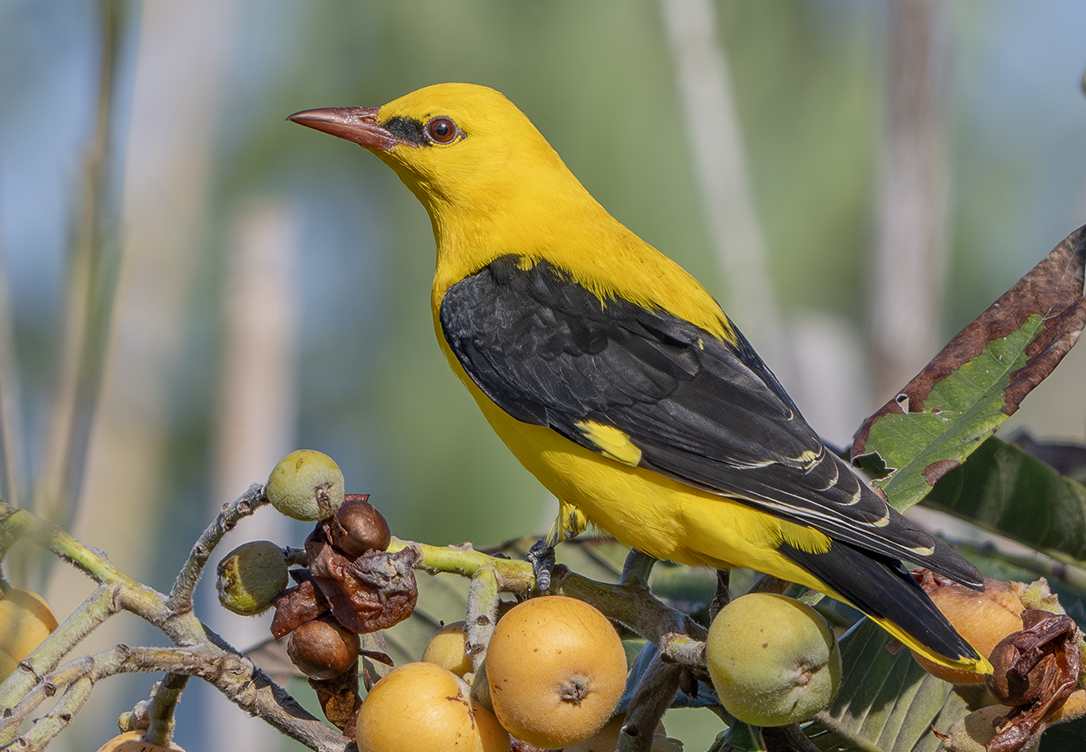
- Male in Ventotene, Italy
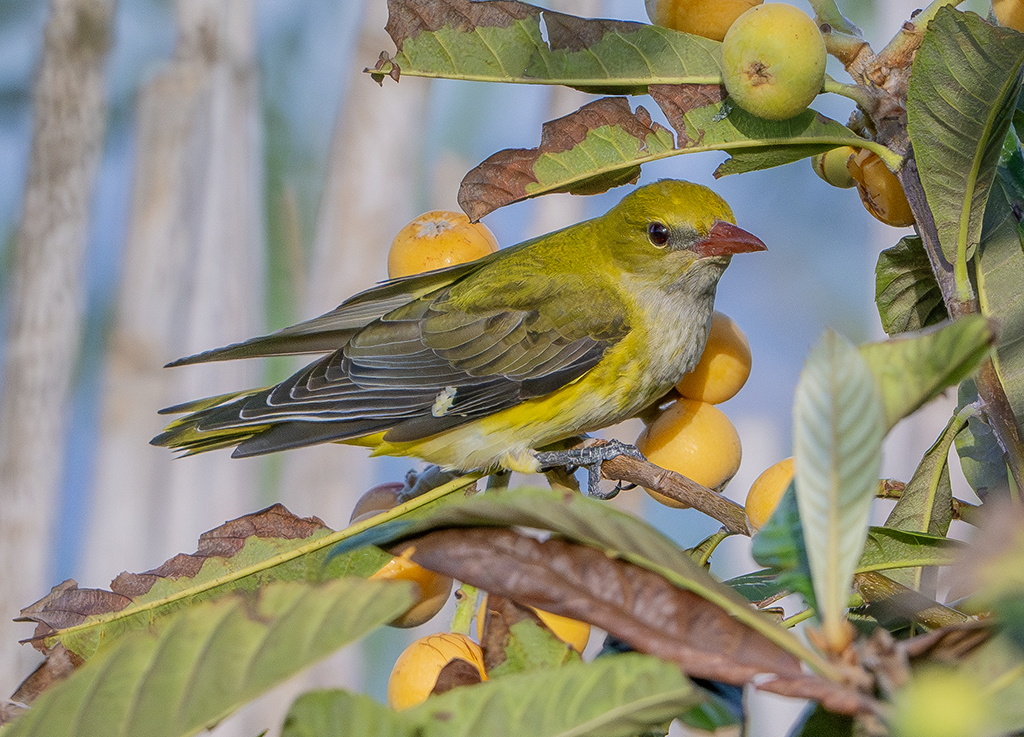
- Female in Ventotene, Italy Song and call recorded in Russia

Conservation status
- Least Concern (IUCN 3.1)

Scientific classification
- Kingdom: Animalia
- Phylum: Chordata
- Class: Aves
- Order: Passeriformes
- Family: Oriolidae
- Genus: Oriolus
- Species: O. oriolus

Binomial name
- Oriolus oriolus (Linnaeus, 1758)
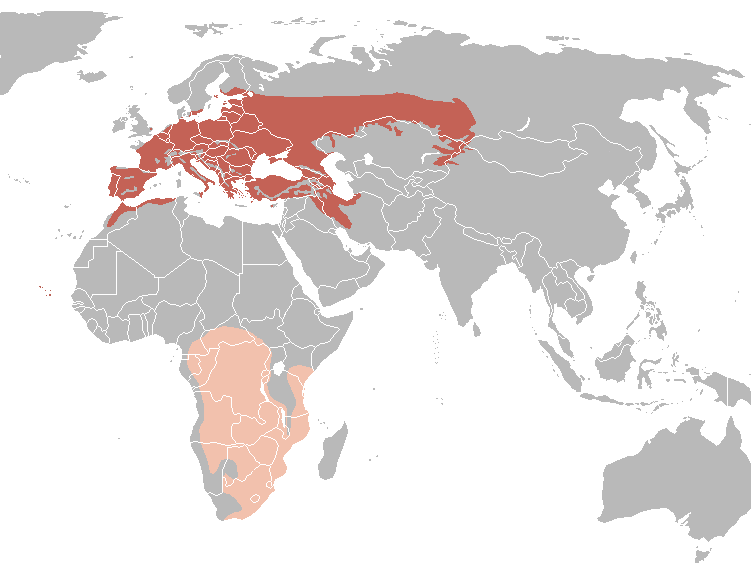
- Summer Winter

Synonyms
- Coracias oriolus Linnaeus, 1758; Oriolus galbula Linnaeus

= Eurasian golden oriole =

Species of bird

The Eurasian golden oriole (Oriolus oriolus), also known as the common golden oriole, is a species of passerine bird, measuring approximately 24cm in length with a wingspan of 44-45cm, and the only Old World oriole breeding in Northern Hemisphere temperate regions. It is a summer migrant in Europe and the Palearctic and spends the winter season in central and southern Africa.

== Taxonomy and systematics ==
The Eurasian golden oriole was formally described by Carl Linnaeus in 1758 in the tenth edition of his Systema Naturae. He named the species Coracias oriolus, assigning it to the genus Coracias, which now contains only rollers. The species is now placed in the genus Oriolus that Linnaeus introduced in 1766, creating a tautonym.

The Eurasian golden oriole and the Indian golden oriole were formerly considered conspecific, but in 2005 they were treated as separate species by the ornithologists Pamela Rasmussen and John Anderton, in the first edition of their Birds of South Asia. Support for this split was provided by a molecular phylogenetic study published in 2010, and most ornithologists now treat the Indian golden oriole as a separate species. Alternate names for the Eurasian golden oriole include the European golden oriole and western Eurasian golden oriole. The species is monotypic; no subspecies are recognized.

=== Etymology ===
The name "oriole" was first used in the 18th century and is an adaptation of the scientific Latin genus name, which is derived from the Classical Latin "aureolus" meaning golden. Various forms of "oriole" have existed in Romance languages since the 12th and 13th centuries. Albertus Magnus used the Latin form oriolus in about 1250 and erroneously stated that it was onomatopoeic because of the golden oriole's song. In medieval England, its name, derived from the song, was the woodwele.

== Description ==
The male is striking in the typical oriole black and yellow plumage, but the female is a drabber green bird. Orioles are shy, and even the male is remarkably difficult to see in the dappled yellow and green leaves of the canopy. In flight they look somewhat like a thrush, strong and direct with some shallow dips over longer distances.

Its call is a harsh "kweeaahk", but the song is a fluting weela-wee-ooo or or-iii-ole, unmistakable once heard, often with subtle variations between each phrase.

The male of the Indian golden oriole (Oriolus kundoo) has a black eye-stripe extending behind the eye, has a longer and paler red bill and has more yellow in the plumage.

== Distribution and habitat ==
The breeding range of this species spans from western Europe and Scandinavia east to China. They winter in central and southern Africa. They generally migrate during the night, but may travel during the day in the spring migration. During the autumn migration they migrate via the Eastern Mediterranean where they feed on fruit; they are often considered a pest in this region because of this. They formerly bred in Great Britain; the last confirmed breeding was in 2009 in East Anglia.

The Eurasian golden oriole inhabits a range of habitats. In Western Europe they prefer open broadleaf forests and plantations, copses, riverine forests, orchards, large gardens; in Eastern Europe they may inhabit more continuous forests as well as mixed or coniferous forests. They generally avoid treeless habitats but may forage there. In their wintering habitat they are found in semi-arid to humid woodland, tall forests, riverine forest, woodland/savanna mosaic and savanna.

== Behaviour and ecology ==
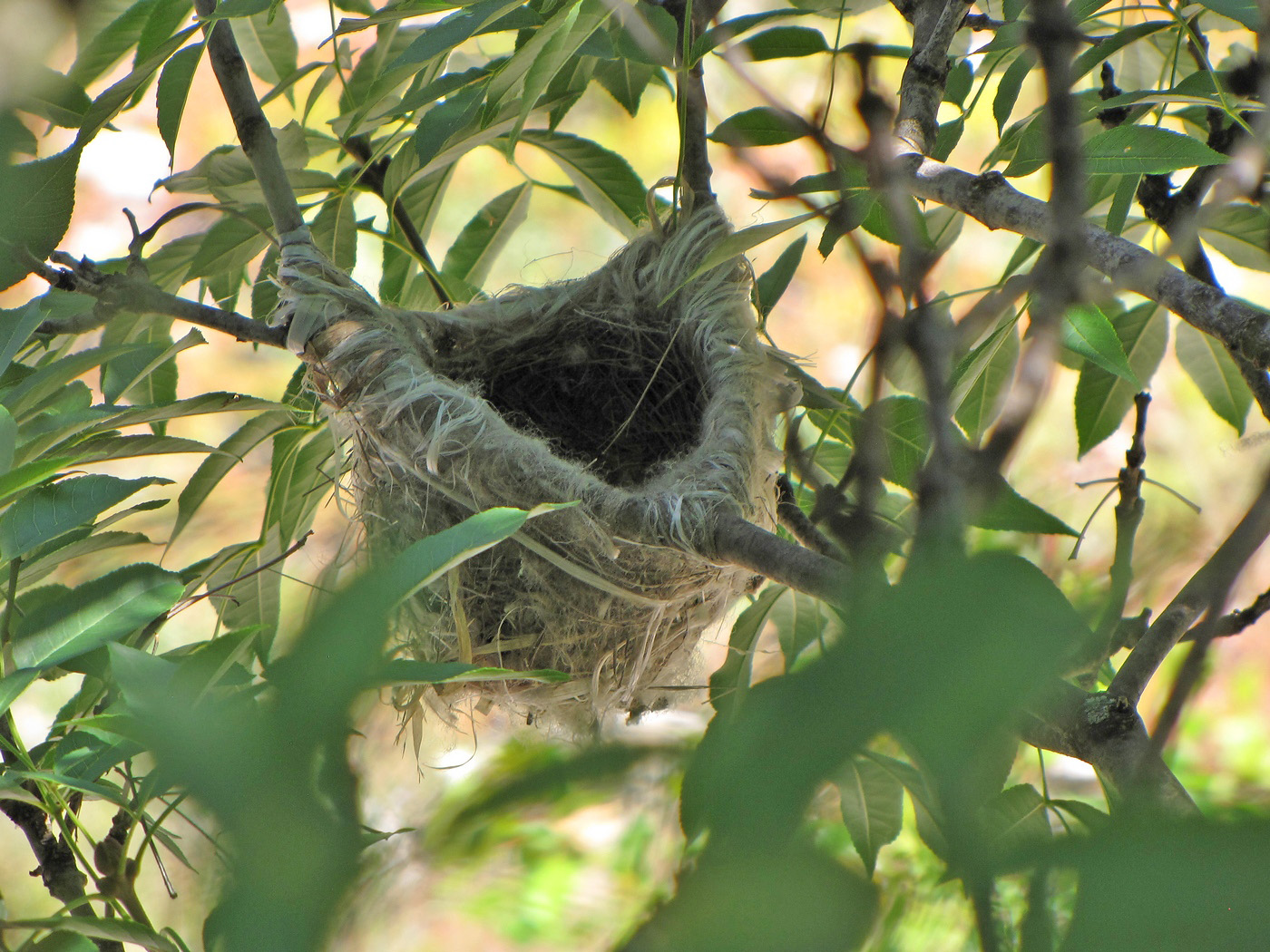
Nest placed in fork

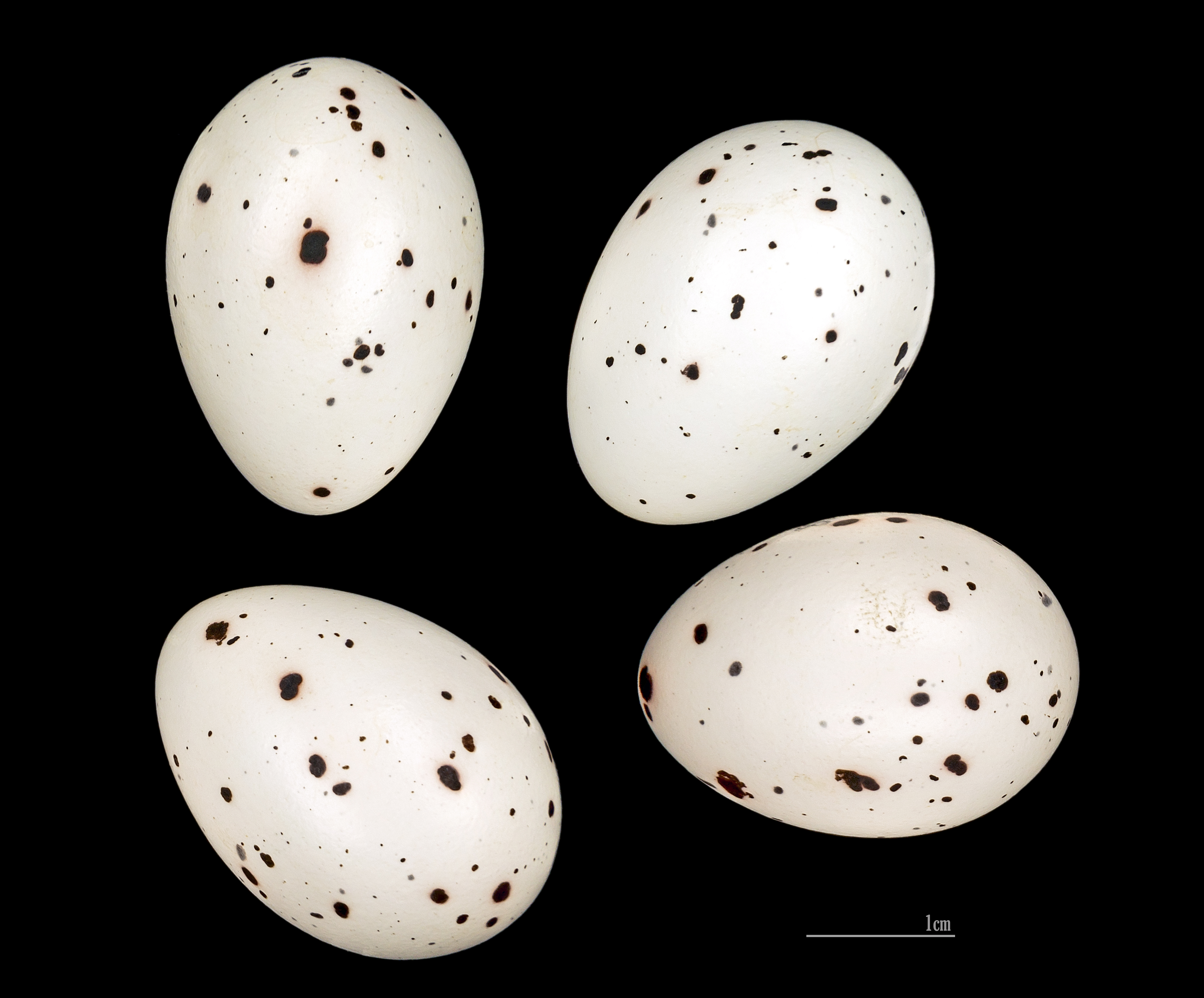
Eggs of Oriolus oriolus

=== Breeding ===
Eurasian golden orioles may delay breeding until they are 2 or 3 years of age. Males usually arrive at breeding area several days before the females. The fidelity to a territory or even to a specific nest site suggests that the pair-bond may continue from one breeding season to the next. The nest is placed high in a tree towards the edge of the crown. The deep cup-shaped nest is suspended below a horizontal fork of thin branches. It is built by the female, but the male will sometimes gather some of the material. The nest is held in place by plant fibres up to 40 cm (16 in) in length and lined with fine grass, feathers and wool. The clutch is usually between 3 and 5 eggs. These are laid at daily intervals early in the morning. The eggs are on average 30.4 mm × 21.3 mm (1.20 in × 0.84 in) with a calculated weight of 7.3 g (0.26 oz). They can be white, cream or very pale pink and are decorated with black marks which are sometimes concentrated at the larger end. The eggs are mainly incubated by the female but the male will incubate for short periods to allow the female to feed. The eggs hatch after 16–17 days. The young are fed by both parents but are mostly brooded by the female. The young fledge after 16–17 days. The clutch is only rarely lost to predators as the parents vigorously defend their nest.

The greatest recorded age for a Eurasian golden oriole is 10 years and 1 month for a male that was ringed in Lincolnshire in 1986 and seen alive in Cambridgeshire in 1996.

=== Feeding ===
They feed on insects and fruit, using their bills to pick insects out of crevices.

== Conservation ==
Golden orioles have an extremely large range with large populations that are apparently stable. Therefore, they are evaluated as least concern by BirdLife International.

== Sources ==
- Cramp, Stanley; Perrins, C.M., eds. (1993). "Oriolus oriolus Golden oriole". Handbook of the Birds of Europe the Middle East and North Africa. The Birds of the Western Palearctic. Vol. VII: Flycatchers to Strikes. Oxford: Oxford University Press. pp. 415–433. ISBN 978-0-19-857510-8.
