= Kanhaiyalal Sethia =

Rajasthani poet (1919–2008)

Yug Charan Kanhaiyalal Sethia
- Born: 11 September 1919; Sujangarh, Churu District, Rajasthan, India
- Died: 11 November 2008 (aged 89); Kolkata, West Bengal, India
- Education: Scottish Church College, University of Calcutta
- Occupations: Poet, freedom fighter, social worker, reformer, philanthropist, environmentalist
- Known for: Nationalistic poetry during the Indian independence movement
- Children: Two sons and a daughter
- Parent(s): Chhagan Mal Sethia (father), Manohari Devi (mother)

Kanhaiyalal Sethia (11 September 1919 – 11 November 2008) was a well-known Rajasthani and Hindi poet. He was born in Sujangarh, in what is now Churu District in the Indian state of Rajasthan. He was a passionate supporter of making Rajasthani, the mother tongue of the people of Rajasthan, at the union level. He was a government-recognized freedom fighter, social worker, reformer, philanthropist and environmentalist. He is known as fulfulling the role of the Yug-Charan for his nationalistic poetry during the freedom struggle.

== Family ==
Kanhaiyalal's parents were Chhagan Mal Sethia and Manohari Devi. He graduated from the Scottish Church College at the University of Calcutta.

He has two sons and a daughter.

== Work ==
His first collection, Ramaniyai ra soratha, was written in the traditional style of didactic poetry rich in images and similes.

His other books of Rajasthani poems are Minjhara, Kum kum, Lilatamsa, Dhara kuncham dhara majalam, Mayada Ro Helo, Sabada, Satavani, Aghori kala, Leek Lakodia, Hemani, Kakko Kod Ro, and Deeth.

His book of poetic prose is Gala-gachiya.

Kanhaiyalal wrote 18 books in Hindi: Vanphool (1941), Agniveena (1942), Mera Yug (1948), Deepkiran (1954), Pratibimb (3rd edition), (1996), Aaj Himalaya Bola (1962), Khuli Krirkiyan Chaure Raaste (1967), Pranam (1970), Marm (1973), Anam (1974), Nirgranth (1976), Swagat (1986), Deh Videh (1986), Akask Ganga (1990), Vaaman - Viraat (1991), Nishpatti (1993), Shreyas (1997), Trayee (1998), 14 books in Rajasthani, and two books in Urdu: Taj Mahal (1975) and Gulchi (2001).

Two of his Rajasthani poems are world famous and have attained cult status. "Dharti Dhoran Ri" is recognized as the anthem song of Rajasthan throughout the world. Internationally acclaimed film maker Gautam Ghosh has made a documentary based on this poem titled Land of the Sand Dunes which was awarded the Swarna Kamal (Golden Lotus) by the Government of India.

His other poems that are extremely well known are "Pathal 'R' Pithal" and "Kun Jameen Ro Dhani".

Kanhaiyalal's works have been translated in the following languages:

- Pratibimb - Reflections In A Mirror - 1973 - English
- Nirgranth - Nirgranth - 1984 - Bengali
- Nirgranth - Nirgranth - 2007 - English
- Selected Rajasthani Poems - Anuvartan - 1994 - Hindi
- Leeltans - The Blue Jay - 1995 - English,
- Leeltans - Leeltans - 1995 - Hindi
- Khuli Khirkiyan Chaure Raaste - Khuli Khirkiyan Chaure Raaste - Marathi

== Awards ==
Kanhaiyalal Sethia was awarded the Sahitya Akademi Award for his work Lilatansa. He received the Jnanapitha Moortidevi Award in 1986 and Suryamal Mishran Shikhar Award in 1987.

He was conferred Padma Shri award in 2004. He was awarded the Sahithya Vascahpati by the Hindi Sahitya Sammelan, Prayag and the Sahitya Manishi by the Sahitya Academy, Udaipur.

He was also a nationalist and a social activist.

== Death ==
He died in Kolkata 11 November 2008, West Bengal.
