= Poornachandra Tejaswi =

Indian writer, translator, and ornithologist (1938–2007)

- Born: 8 September 1938; Kuppali, Princely State of Mysore, British India
- Died: 5 April 2007 (aged 68); Mudigere, Karnataka, India
- Education: Sahyadri Arts College, Shimoga - UG Maharaja College of Mysore - PG
- Occupations: Writer, novelist, farmer, photographer, ornithologist, painter, polymath
- Spouse: Rajeshwari Tejaswi
- Children: Susmita and Esanye
- Parent(s): Kuvempu, Hemavathi
- Relatives: Kuvempu (father), Hemavathi (mother)
- Writing career
- Pen name: Poochanthe
- Period: 1957–2007
- Genres: Fiction, non-fiction
- Notable works: Jugari Cross, Karvalo, Chidambara Rahasya, Millennium Series
- Movements: Navya, Bandaya movement

Kuppali Puttappa Poornachandra Tejaswi (8 September 1938 – 5 April 2007) was a prominent Indian writer and novelist in Kannada. He also worked as a photographer, publisher, painter, naturalist, and environmentalist. He made a great impression in the Navya ("new") period of Kannada literature and inaugurated the Bandaaya Saahitya genre of protest literature with his short-story collection Abachoorina Post Offisu. He is the son of noted Kannada poet Kuvempu.

At early stages of his writing career, Tejaswi wrote poems but later concentrated on short stories, novels and essays. His distinctive style of writing is credited with heralding a new era in Kannada literature.

== Early life ==
Tejaswi was born on 8 September 1938 in Kuppalli in Shivamogga district of Karnataka. Although he was the son of Kuvempu, he came out of his father's shadow and established his own image at an early age. Tejaswi received best story award in the competition held by Prajavani Kannada newspaper on the occasion of Deepavali, for his first short story "Linga Banda", a look at the rainy Western Ghats from the eye of a boy. After completion of his education from Maharaja College of Mysore, one among the top colleges in India, due to his interests in nature and farming, he moved to Mudigere taluk of Chikkamagaluru District after buying a coffee estate. Apart from literature he was actively involved in painting, photography and philosophy.

He was a keen learner of nature and his favourite pastime was to roam around in the forests of Western Ghats.

== Literary works ==
Tejaswi has written in almost all forms of literature including poems, short stories, novels, travel literature, plays and science fiction. Nature and incidents related to nature enjoy major roles in most of his works. One of the most popular writers in Kannada, Tejaswi's works have continued to remain popular, going into multiple prints and often topping reader's charts. Karvalo is one such novel where the author participates in an adventure of discovering a flying lizard in the dense forests of Western Ghats.

Tejaswi has translated a number of English books to Kannada enriching the depth of Kannada literature. His famous translations include the series on Kenneth Anderson's hunting expeditions and Henri Charrière's Papillon.

Tejaswi wrote his first novel, Kaadu Mattu Kraurya, when he was a 24-year-old in 1962. The novel is expected to be in print for the first time towards the end of 2012. He had initially planned to name this work Nalini but later decided to go by its present title. Tejaswi was inspired to write the novel after visiting his wife Rajeshwari's maternal home in the forested Malnad region of Karnataka. The novel, whose manuscript was prepared by Rajeshwari, is the story of Linga, a migrant bonded labourer from north Karnataka who moves to a remote Malnad village where he struggles to cope with his new life and surroundings.

== Awards received by Poornachandra Tejaswi ==
- Sahitya Academy Award for "Chidambara Rahasya" (1987)
- Karnataka Sahitya Academy (1985)
- Pampa Award (2001) Honorary Award for Lifetime Achievement
- Rajyotsava Award
- Karnataka Sahitya Academy Award for "Karvalo"
- Karnataka Sahitya Academy Award for "Chidambara Rahasya"
- Karnataka Sahitya Academy Award for "Kiragoorina Gayyaligalu"
- Karnataka Sahitya Academy Award for "Alemariya Andaman Mattu Mahanadi Nile"
- Karnataka Sahitya Academy Award for "Parisarada Kathe
- Karnataka Sahitya Academy Award for "Kaadina Kathegalu"
- Karnataka Sahitya Academy Award for "Vismaya" along with Pradeep Kenjige
- Karnataka State Film Award for Best Story 1986-87 for "Tabarana Kathe"
- Karnataka State Film Award for Best Dialogue 1986-87 for "Tabarana Kathe"
- Karnataka State Film Award for Best Story 1989-90 for "Kubi mattu Iyala"

== Bibliography ==
=== Novellas ===
- Swaroopa
- Nigoodha Manushyaru

=== Novels ===
- Karvalo (1980)
- Chidambara Rahasya (1985)
- Jugari Cross (1992)
- Mayaloka - 1 (2006)
- Kaadu Mattu Kraurya (2012)

=== Short stories ===
- Huliyoorina Sarahaddu
- Abachurina Post Office (1973)
- Kiragoorina Gayyaligalu (1990)
- Pakakaranthi Mattu Itara Kathegalu (2008)
- Parisarada kathe (1991)
- Aeroplane Chitte Mattu Itara Kathegalu (1993)
- Aayda Kathegalu (2007)

=== Travelogue ===
- Alemariya Andaman Mattu Mahanadi Nile

=== Poetry ===
- Somuvina Swagata Lahari (1964)

=== Drama ===
- Yamala Prashne (1965)

=== Criticism ===
- Vyaktivishishta Siddantha (1967)
- Vimarsheya Vimarshe (2011)
- Hosa Vicharagalu (2015)

=== Adventure ===
- Bellandoorina Narabhakshaka (Kadina Kategalu Volume 1)
- Peddacheruvina Rakshasa (Kadina Kategalu Volume 2)
- Jaalahalliya Kurka (Kadina Kategalu Volume 3)
- Munishami Mathu Magadi Chirathe (Kadina Kategalu Volume 4)
- Rudraprayagada Bhayanaka Narabhakshaka

=== Science ===
- Sahaja Krushi
- Missing Link
- Flying Saucers (Part 1& 2)
- Vismaya (1, 2 & 3)

=== About birds & nature ===
- Minchulli [ Kannada Naadina Hakkigalu - 1]
- Hejje Moodada Haadi [ Kannada Naadina Hakkigalu - 2 ]
- Hakki Pukka
- Mayeya Mukhagalu (Photo Album)
- Birds Hill Region of Karnataka - An Introduction - with A K Chakravarthy ( probably his only English book)

=== Millennium (series 1-16) ===
- Hudukata
- Jeevana Sangrama
- Pacific Dweepagalu
- Chandrana Chooru
- Nerehoreya Geleyaru
- Mahayudda
- Desha Videsha
- Mahapalayana
- Vismaya Vishwa
- Adventure

=== Translation (Autobiography of Henri Charrière) ===
- Papillon - 1
- Papillon - 2
- Baji Papiyon - 3

(Translated with Pradeep Kenjige)

=== Biography ===
- Annana Nenapu

Annana Nenapu is a biography of the Tejaswi which discusses his days with his father, the national poet of India Rashtrakavi Kuvempu, revealing the actual lifestyle of the Kuvempu and his bonding with his family.

== About Tejaswi ==
- Nanna Tejaswi by Rajeshwari Tejaswi
- Poornachandra Tejaswi Baduku Baraha by Karigowda Beechanahalli
- Poornachandra Tejaswi Avara Sahitya Vachike by Karigowda Beechanahalli
- K. P. Poornachandra Tejaswi by Maheshwaraiah
- Kaadina Santa Tejaswi by Dhananjaya Jeevala

== Works in visual media ==
Movies

- Abachurina Post Office
- Tabarana Kathe
- Kubi Mattu Iyala
- Kiragoorina Gayyaligalu
- Daredevil Musthafa

TV Serial

- Chidambara Rahasya - Directed by Girish Karnad for DD - Chandana

Plays

- Jugari Cross
- Chidambara Rahasya
- Krishnegowdana Aane
- Yamala Prashne
- Maayamruga
- Parisarada Kathe
- Karvalo
- Kiragoorina Gayyaligalu

== Trivia ==
- Tejaswi heralded a new wave, when he (with like-minded friends) compiled Kuvempu's Sri Ramayana Darshanam in Kuvempu's handwriting. The Government of Karnataka aided the effort with grants, but the cost of the book was high and ended up with mediocre success.
- A controversy started in early 2004 demanding inducting Madhwacharya's name in Jaya Bharata Jananiya Tanujate, written by Kuvempu. Tejaswi, as son of Kuvempu and holder of copyrights of Kuvempu's articles, strongly criticised any attempts to change the poem.
- While some intellectuals condemned the daubing incident of Belgaum Mayor Vijay More's face with black paint on 11 November 2005, Tejaswi rhetorically asked if More deserved Fair & Lovely instead.
- Tejaswi had a great appetite and was known for his fondness for good food.

== Death ==
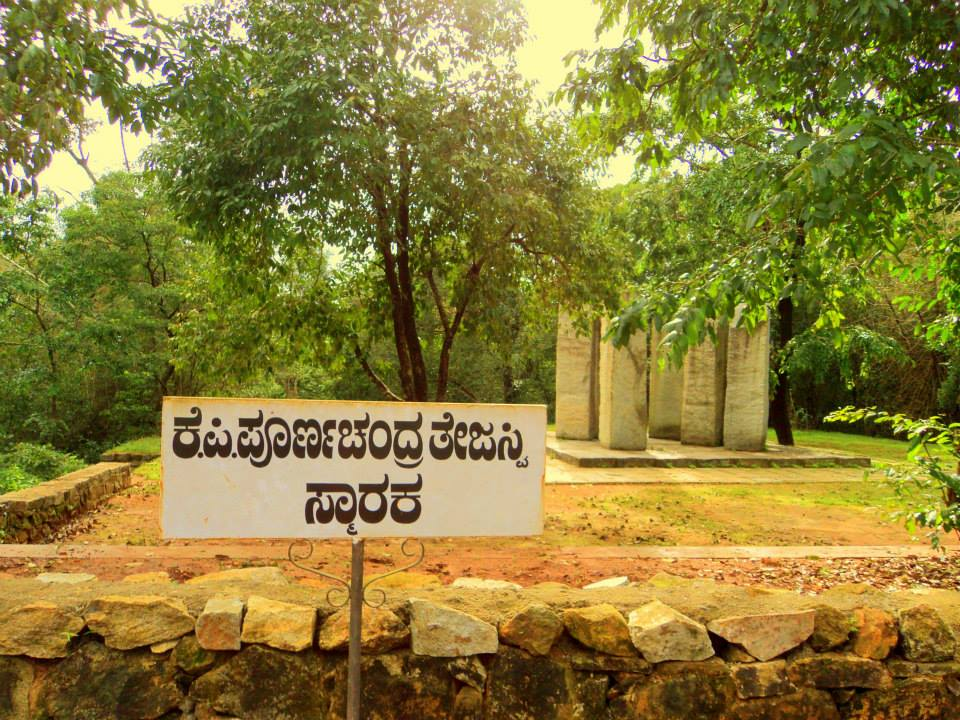
Tejaswi memorial at Kuppalli

He died of cardiac arrest at his farm house Niruttara, Mudigere in Chikmagalur district of Karnataka state, on 5 April 2007 approximately at 2.00 p.m. He was 68 at the time. He has 2 daughters Susmitha and Eshanye who are software professionals. His wife Rajeshwari stayed in Niruttara, Mudigere.

== See also ==
- Kannada
- Kannada literature
