= Chidambara Rahasya =

1985 novel by Poornachandra Tejaswi

- Cover page of English translation, 2011
- Author: Poornachandra Tejaswi
- Translator: P. P. Giridhar
- Language: Kannada
- Subject: Psychology, Philosophy, Thriller
- Genre: Fiction
- Published: 1985 Sahitya Bhandara
- Publication place: India
- Media type: Print (Hardcover)
- Award: Sahitya Akademi Award (1987)

Chidambara Rahasya is a novel written by Poornachandra Tejaswi. This novel depicts the state of a small Indian village in humorous manner. This book has murder investigation, caste system, communal riots, blind beliefs, love story, cardamom plants, friendship, youth rebels, land lords, untouchables, politics of the village. In 2006, Girish Karnad made a teleserial based on the novel This book won the Sahitya Academy Award for Kannada in 1987. It was translated into English by P. P. Giridhar as The Inscrutable Mystery. The translation was published by Sahitya Akademi.
