= Kuvempu =

Indian poet (1904–1994)

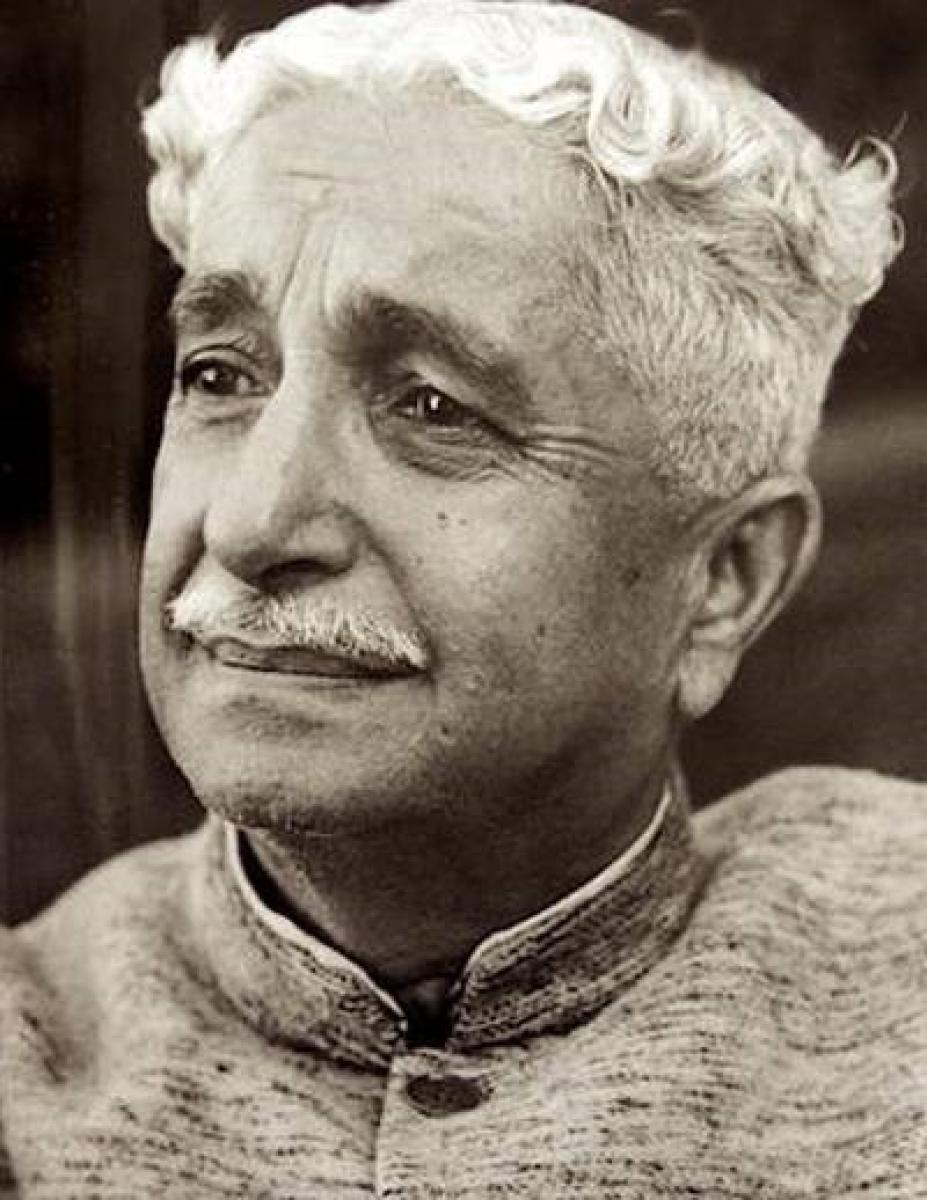
- Kuvempu in the 1960s
- Born: Kuppalli Venkatappa Puttappa; 29 December 1904; Hirekodige, Koppa, Chikmagalur, Kingdom of Mysore (now in Karnataka)
- Died: 11 November 1994 (aged 89); Mysore, Karnataka, India
- Occupations: Poet, novelist, playwright, academic
- Spouse: Hemavathi (m. 1937–1994)
- Children: 4, including Poornachandra Tejaswi
- Writing career
- Pen name: Kuvempu
- Language: Kannada
- Genres: Fiction, drama
- Notable awards: Karnataka Ratna (1992); Padma Vibhushan (1988); Jnanapith Award (1967); Padma Bhushan (1958) Sahitya Akademi Award (1955)
- Movement: Navodaya

Kuppalli Venkatappa Puttappa (29 December 1904 – 11 November 1994), popularly known by his pen name Kuvempu//, was an Indian poet, playwright, novelist and critic. He is widely regarded as the greatest Kannada poet of the 20th century. He was the first Kannada writer to receive the Jnanapith Award.

Kuvempu studied at Mysuru University in the 1920s, taught there for nearly three decades and served as its vice-chancellor from 1956 to 1960. He initiated education in Kannada as the language medium. For his contributions to Kannada literature, the Government of Karnataka decorated him with the honorific Rashtrakavi ("National Poet") in 1964 and Karnataka Ratna ("The Gem of Karnataka") in 1992. He was conferred the Padma Bhushan in 1958 and Padma Vibhushan in 1988 by the Government of India. He penned the Karnataka State Anthem Jaya Bharata Jananiya Tanujate.

== Biography ==
=== Early life and education ===
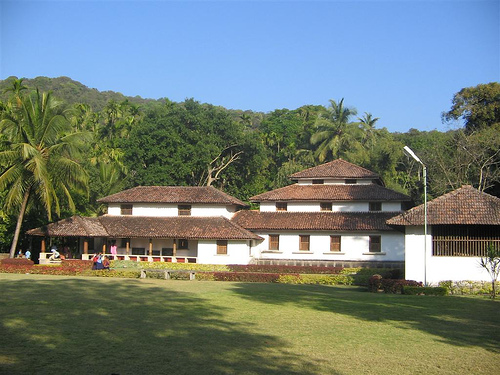
Kuvempu's ancestral house in Kuppali

Kuvempu was born in Hirekodige, a village in Koppa taluk of Chikmagalur district and raised in Kuppalli, a village in Shivamogga district of the erstwhile Kingdom of Mysore (now in Karnataka) into a Kannada-speaking Vokkaliga family. His mother Seethamma hailed from Koppa, Chikmangalur, while his father Vemkatappa was from Kuppali, a village in Thirthahalli taluk (in present-day Shimoga district), where he was raised. He had two younger sisters, Danamma and Puttamma. Early in his childhood, Kuvempu was home-schooled by an appointed teacher from South Canara. He joined the Anglo-Vernacular school in Thirthahalli to continue his middle school education. Kuvempu's father died when he was only twelve. He finished his lower and secondary education in Kannada and English languages in Thirthahalli and moved to Mysore for further education at the Wesleyan High School. Thereafter, he pursued college studies at the Maharaja College of Mysore and graduated in 1929, majoring in Kannada.

=== Family ===
Kuvempu married Hemavathi on 30 April 1937. Kuvempu had two sons, Poornachandra Tejaswi and Kokilodaya Chaitra, and two daughters, Indukala and Tharini. Tharini is married to K.Chidananda Gowda the former Vice-Chancellor of Kuvempu University. His home in Mysore is called Udayaravi. His son Poornachandra Tejaswi was a polymath, contributing significantly to Kannada literature, photography, calligraphy, digital imaging, social movements, and agriculture.

=== Career ===
Kuvempu began his academic career as a lecturer of Kannada language at the Maharaja's College in Mysore in 1929. He worked as an assistant professor in the Central college, Bengaluru from 1936. He re-joined Maharaja's college in Mysore in 1946 as a professor. He went on to become the principal of the Maharaja's college in 1955. In 1956 he was selected as the Vice-Chancellor of Mysore University where he served till retirement in 1960. He was the first graduate from Mysore University to rise to that position.

== Writings ==
=== Epic ===
- Sri Ramayana Darshanam/ಶ್ರೀ ರಾಮಾಯಣ ದರ್ಶನಂ - Volume-01 (1949), Volume-02 (1957)
- Chitrangada/ಚಿತ್ರಾಂಗದಾ

=== Novels ===
- Kaanuru Heggaditi/ಕಾನೂರು ಹೆಗ್ಗಡಿತಿ (1936)
- Malegalalli Madumagalu/ಮಲೆಗಳಲ್ಲಿ ಮದುಮಗಳು (1967)

=== Plays ===
- Jalagaara/ಜಲಗಾರ (1928)
- Birugaali/ಬಿರುಗಾಳಿ (1930)
- Maharaatri/ಮಹಾರಾತ್ರಿ (1931)
- Smashana Kurukshethra/ಸ್ಮಶಾನ ಕುರುಕ್ಷೇತ್ರ (1931)
- Raktaakshi/ರಕ್ತಾಕ್ಷಿ (1932)
- Shoodra Tapaswi/ಶೂದ್ರ ತಪಸ್ವಿ (1944)
- Beralge koral/ಬೆರಳ್ಗೆ ಕೊರಳ್
- Yamana solu/ಯಮನ ಸೇೂಲು
- Chandrahasa/ಚಂದ್ರಹಾಸ
- Balidaana/ಬಲಿದಾನ
- Kaaneena/ಕಾನೀನ (1974)

=== Autobiography ===
- Nenapina Doniyali/ನೆನಪಿನ ದೇೂಣಿಯಲಿ (1980)

=== Collection of stories ===
- Sanyaasi Mattu Itare Kathegalu / ಸನ್ಯಾಸಿ ಮತ್ತು ಇತರೆ ಕಥೆಗಳು (1937)
- Nanna Devaru Mattu Itare Kathegalu / ನನ್ನ ದೇವರು ಮತ್ತು ಇತರೆ ಕಥೆಗಳು (1940)

=== Essays ===
- Malenaadina Chittragalu / ಮಲೆನಾಡಿನ ಚಿತ್ರಗಳು (1933)

=== Literary criticism ===
- Atmashreegagi Nirankushamatigalagi (1969)
- Kavyavihara (1969)
- Taponandana (1969)
- Vibhuthi Pooje / ವಿಭೂತಿ ಪೂಜೆ (1969)
- Draupadiya Shrimudi (1969)
- Vicharakrantige Ahvana (1969)
- Sahityaprachara
- Ithyadi
- Raso Vai Saha

=== Essay and Other ===
- Manujamatha Viswapatha
- Kavya Vihara
- Mantramangalya

=== Biography ===
- Swami Vivekananda (1932)
- Sri Ramakrishna Paramahamsa (1934)

=== Translation ===
- Guruvinodane Devaredege
- Janapriya Valmiki Ramayana

=== Stories and poems for children ===
- Bommanahalliya kindarijogi(1936)
- Mari vijnani(1947)
- Meghapura (1947)
- Nanna mane
- Nanna gopala
- Amalana kathe
- Sahasa pavana
- Modannana Tamma
- Narigaligeke Kodilla
- Haluru

=== Poetry ===
- Kolalu (1930)
- Panchajanya (1933)
- Navilu (1934)
- Kalasundari (1934)
- Kathana Kavanagalu (1937)
- Kogile Matthu Soviet Russia (1944)
- Prema Kashmeera (1946)
- Agnihamsa (1946)
- Krutthike (1946)
- Pakshikashi (1946)
- Kinkini (Collection of Vachana) (1946)
- Shodashi (1946)
- Chandramanchake Baa Chakori (1957)
- Ikshugangothri (1957)
- Anikethana (1963)
- Jenaguva (1964)
- Anutthara (1965)
- Manthrakshathe (1966)
- Kadaradake (1967)
- Prethakyoo (1967)
- Kuteechaka (1967)
- Honna Hotthaare (1976)
- Koneya Thene Matthu Vishwamanava Sandesha (1981)

=== Movies ===
- Kanooru Heggadithi (directed by Girish Karnad).

=== Drama ===
- Malegalalli Madumagalu (directed by Basavalingaiah)

== Awards and honours ==
Bust of Kuvempu at Dr. Rajkumar Children Park (Jinke Park), Bengaluru (2026)

- Karnataka Ratna (1992)
- Padma Vibhushan (1988)
- Pampa Award (1987)
- Nadoja Award (1995)
- Jnanpith Award (1967)
- Rashtrakavi ("National Poet") (1964)
- Padma Bhushan (1958)
- Sahitya Akademi Award (1955)
- To landmark the golden jubilee of Kannada's first Jnanapeeth award, on 29 December 2017, Kuvempu's 113th birth anniversary, Google India dedicated a Google Doodle in his honor.

== Memorials ==
=== Kavimane — Kuvempu memorial ===
Kuvempu's memorial in Kavishaila, Kuppali

The childhood home of Kuvempu at Kuppali has been converted into a museum by Rashtrakavi Kuvempu Pratishtana (a trust dedicated to Kuvempu). This trust has undertaken immense developmental works in Kuppali to showcase Kuvempu and his works to the external world. On the night of 23 November 2015, many valuables including the Padma Shri and Padma Bhushan awards conferred on poet laureate Kuvempu were stolen from Kavimane.

The entire museum has been ransacked. The surveillance cameras there have also been damaged. The Jnanapith award kept there has remained intact.

=== Kavishaila ===
The gradually rising hill south of the house is named Kavishaila, Kuvempu's mortal remains were placed at Kavishaila.

== Biographies on Kuvempu ==
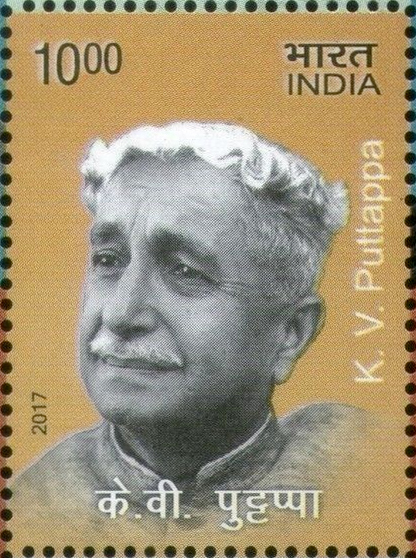
Kuvempu on a 2017 stamp of India

- Annana Nenapu, Poornachandra Tejaswi
- Yugada Kavi, K.C. Shiva Reddy
- Kuvempu, Pradhan Gurudatta
- Magalu Kanda Kuvempu, Tharini Chidananda,

== Commemoration ==
The Kuvempu University in Shimoga, Karnataka was established in 1987. The Vishwamanava Express was named in honour of Kuvempu's idea of "Vishwa Manava" ("Universal Man").

India Post honoured Kuvempu by releasing a postage stamp in 1997 and 2017.

Shivamogga Airport is named after him.

== See also ==
- List of Indian writers
- Kannada language
- Kannada literature
- Kannada poetry
- Rashtrakavi - list of poets who have borne the title.
