= Abachurina Post Office =

- Directed by: N. Lakshminarayan
- Written by: Poornachandra Tejaswi
- Based on: Abachoorina Post Office by Poornachandra Tejaswi
- Produced by: Patre C. Vinayak
- Starring: Naani; Girija Lokesh; Ramesh Bhat
- Cinematography: N. G. Rao
- Edited by: P. Bhaktavatsalam
- Music by: Vijaya Bhaskar
- Production company: Chitra Shilpi
- Release date: 1973
- Running time: 106 minutes
- Country: India
- Language: Kannada

Abachurina Post Office ( transl. The Post Office of Abachur) is a 1973 Indian Kannada language drama film directed by N. Lakshminarayan, based on a short story of the same name written by Poornachandra Tejaswi. It was the first film adaptation of Tejaswi's works. It stars Naani, Girija Lokesh, Dasharathi Dikshith and Ramesh Bhat in lead roles. The film won many laurels upon release including the National Film Award for Best Feature Film in Kannada for its clear handling of the typical human mind amidst his curiosity. However, critics have argued that the film's focus is markedly different from that of the short story and fails to capture the writer's real intentions.

The film produced by Patre C. Vinayak was certified with U grade and its musical score is by Vijaya Bhaskar.

== Cast ==
- Naani
- Girija Lokesh
- Dasharathi Dikshith
- S. Seetharam
- Ramesh Bhat
- B. S. Rama Rao
- M. S. Sheela
- A. L. Sreenivasan
- P. Renuka
- B. R. Jayaram

== Music ==
The background score is composed by Vijaya Bhaskar. No soundtrack has been released for the film.

== Awards ==
- 1973 : National Film Award for Best Feature Film in Kannada
- 1973-74 : Karnataka State Film Award for Best Film
