= Kanooru Heggadithi =

- DVD Cover
- Directed by: Girish Karnad
- Written by: Kuvempu
- Screenplay by: Girish Karnad
- Based on: The House Of Kanooru by Kuvempu
- Produced by: H. G. Narayan
- Starring: Girish Karnad; Tara
- Music by: B. V. Karanth
- Release date: 19 November 1999 (India)
- Running time: 126 minutes
- Country: India
- Language: Kannada

Kaanooru Heggadithi (Kaanooru Headwoman) is a 1999 Indian film based on the 1936 novel "Kanooru Subbamma Heggadithi" by Kannada writer Kuvempu, and directed by playwright and film director Girish Karnad. Set in the Malnad region, the film narrates a story of the land and life of a feudal family in pre-independence Malnad. The film marked Karnad's return to directing after a lapse of over a decade. This is the only instance in the Indian cinema history where one Jnanpith Awardee directed a movie based on the work of another Jnanpith Awardee.

== Synopsis ==
Subbamma (Tara), third wife of Chandre Gowda (Girish Karnad), is a rebellious mistress of the household and encourages sporadic acts of defiance against men from among her women friends. When her husband dies, she uses her position of authority to avenge all the wrongs ever done by man to woman. Her actions end up destroying her, and her place is taken by liberal intellectual Hoovayya.

== Cast ==
- Girish Karnad as Chandre Gowda
- Tara as Subbamma
- Mallika Prasad Sinha as Seete
- Srinivas Prabhu as Seregara (Manager)
- Suchendra Prasad as Hoovayya

== Production ==
The film was shot on locations in the Malnad region at the foothills of the Western Ghats in Karnataka. The film was released on video in 2007.

=== Background ===
The novel by Kuvempu consisted of 700 pages and dealt with over 150 characters. It took Karnad eight months to reduce it to a feature film screenplay which concentrated on four main characters: Chandre Gowda, Seetha, Hoovayya, and Subbamma - Gowda's third wife.

After the shooting began, the women of Megaravalli are returning to their native dress. Even the names of their houses were changed to the titles described in the novel.

Director Karnad said that while the film did justice to the Kuvempu novel, it was only an attempt to portray the complexities of the women characters in Kuvempu's work through an attempt to show the three different aspects of womanhood in a feudal set-up, and the novel itself could not be depicted in full.

== Reception ==
After release, the film rekindled the interest in the novel and approximately 2,000 copies were reprinted.

=== Awards and nominations ===
- 2000, won National Film Award for 'Best Feature Film in Kannada'
