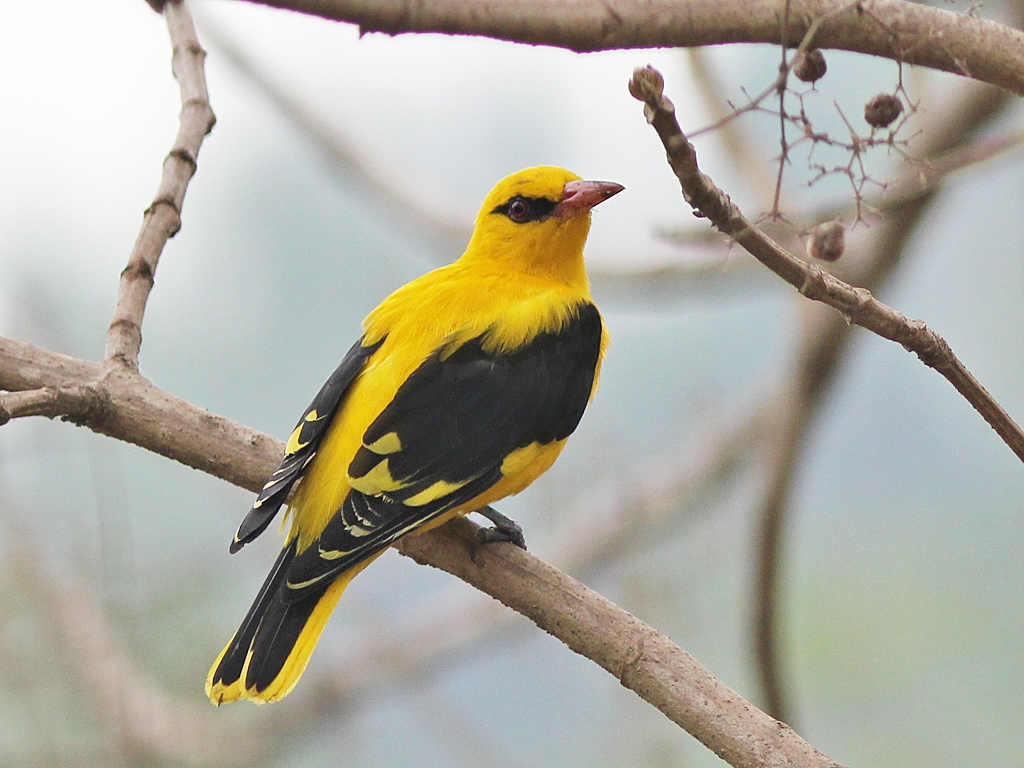

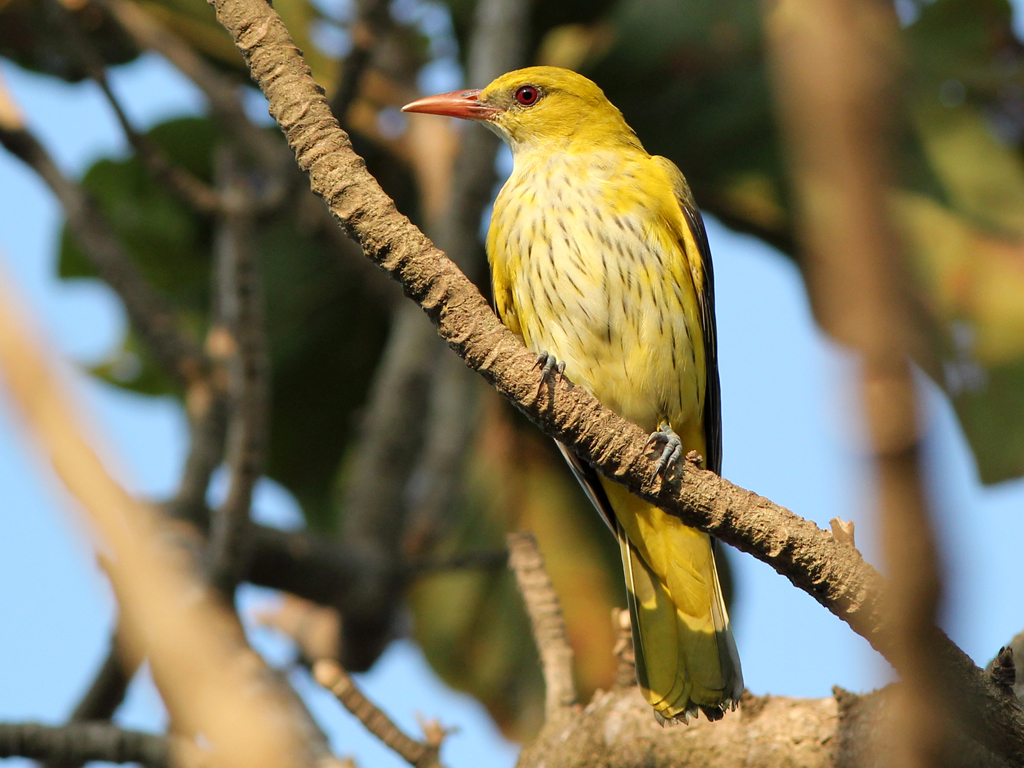
- Adult male (above), female (below)

Conservation status
- Least Concern (IUCN 3.1)

Scientific classification
- Kingdom: Animalia
- Phylum: Chordata
- Class: Aves
- Order: Passeriformes
- Family: Oriolidae
- Genus: Oriolus
- Species: O. kundoo

Binomial name
- Oriolus kundoo Sykes, 1832
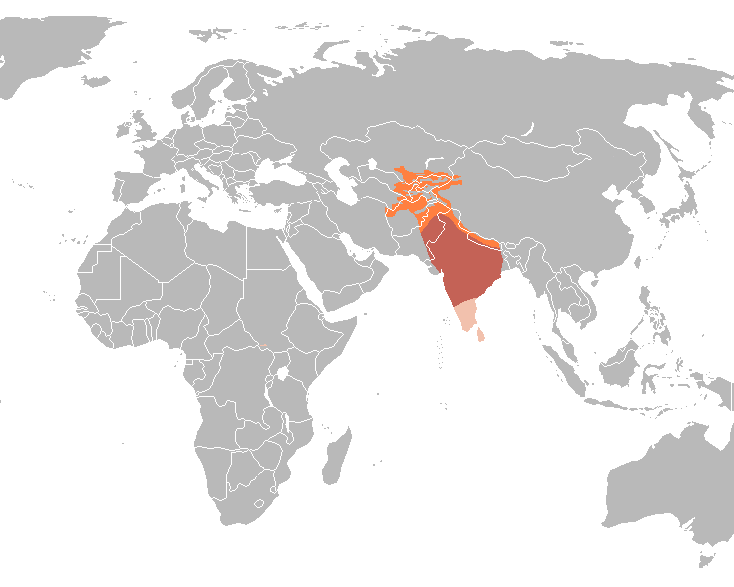
- Approximate distribution

Synonyms
- Oriolus oriolus kundoo

= Indian golden oriole =

Species of bird

The Indian golden oriole (Oriolus kundoo) is a species of oriole found in the Indian subcontinent and Central Asia. The species was formerly considered to be a subspecies of the Eurasian golden oriole, but is now considered a full species. Adults can be told apart from the Eurasian golden oriole by the black of the eye stripe extending behind the eye.

== Taxonomy and systematics ==
The Indian golden oriole was described by the English naturalist William Henry Sykes in 1832 and given the binomial name Oriolus kundoo. Although initially described as a separate species, the Indian golden oriole was usually treated as a subspecies of the Eurasian golden oriole. In 2005, the ornithologists Pamela Rasmussen and John Anderton in their Birds of South Asia decided to treat the two varieties as separate species based on the differences in morphology, plumage, calls and the fact that the two varieties do not intergrade. Support for this split was provided by a molecular phylogenetic study published in 2010, and most ornithologists now treat the Indian golden oriole as a separate species. The race baltistanicus was judged by Charles Vaurie to be indistinguishable from the nominate subspecies and the Indian golden oriole is considered to be monotypic.

== Description ==
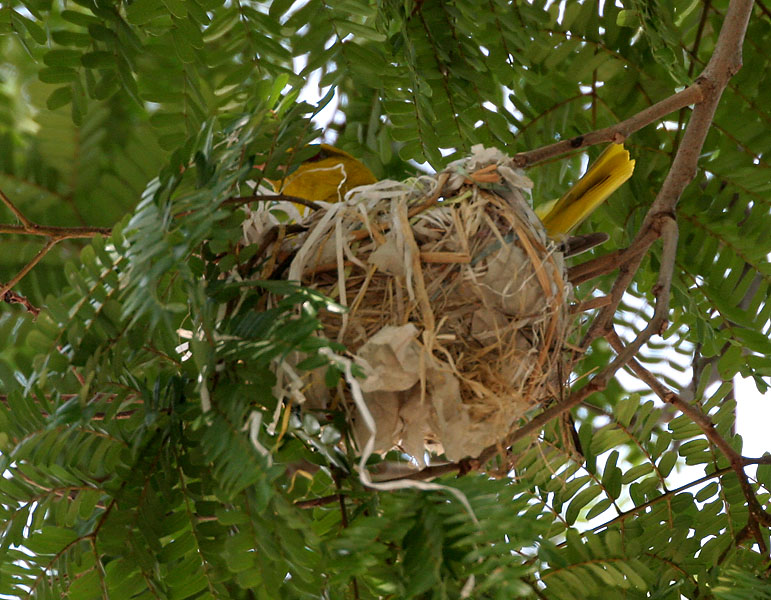
Male in nest (Hyderabad, India)

The Indian golden oriole is very similar to the Eurasian golden oriole but has more yellow in the tail and has a paler shade of red in the iris and bill. The male has the black eye stripe extending behind the eye, a large carpal patch on the wing and wide yellow tips to the secondaries and tertiaries. The streaks on the underside of females is more sharp than in the females of the Eurasian golden oriole. The European species is larger with a wing length of 149–162 mm in adult males compared to 136–144 mm in O. kundoo. The wing formula is also different with primary 2 longer than 5 in O. oriolus while primary 5 is longer than 2 in O. kundoo.

== Distribution and habitat ==
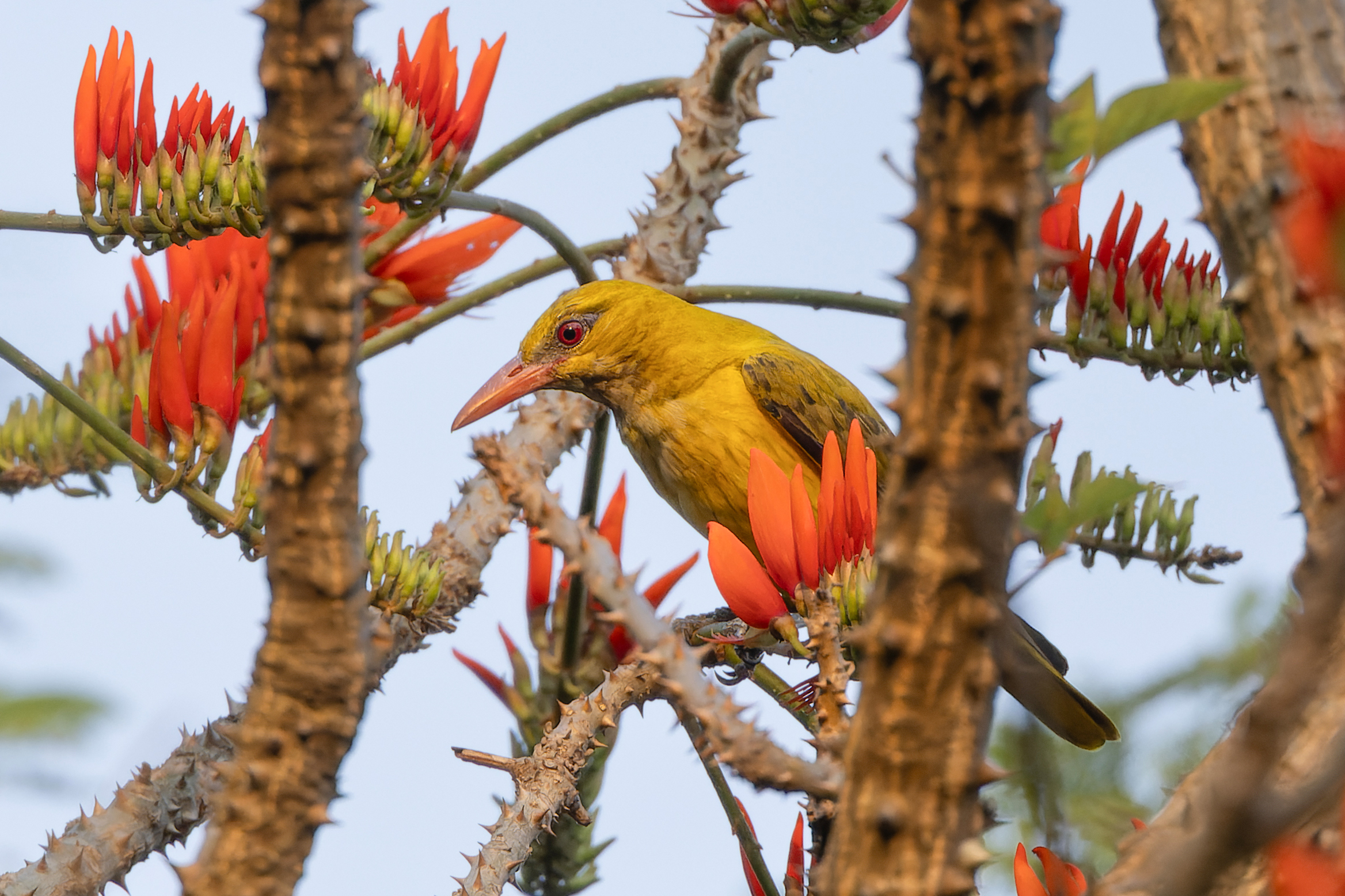
Female on erythrina variegata in Kuldiha Wildlife Sanctuary, Odisha, India.

This oriole breeds from Baluchistan and Afghanistan along the Himalayas to Nepal. Some populations breed in the peninsular region but are very local. The northern populations winter in southern India, with some birds wintering in Sri Lanka. The populations that occur in the Maldives and the Andaman Islands have not been carefully examined.

The Indian golden oriole inhabits a range of habitats including open deciduous forests, semi-evergreen forests, woodland, forest edge, mangroves, open country with scattered trees, parks, gardens, orchards, and plantations.

== Behaviour and ecology ==
The Indian golden oriole's flight is dipping but strong and has been recorded to reach about 40 km/h (25 mph). It sometimes bathes by repeatedly flying into a small pool of water. An individual ringed in Gujarat was recovered in Tajikistan more than nine years later.

=== Breeding ===
The Indian golden oriole is a partial migrant. It breeds in central Asia and the Indian subcontinent. The Indian populations are largely resident while the other populations are migratory. The breeding season is April to August, the nest being a small cup placed in a fork near the end of a branch. Nests are often built in the vicinity of the nest of a black drongo. Two or three white eggs with reddish, brown, and black speckling form the typical clutch. Both parents take part in nest and brood care, defending the nest against intruding birds such as shikras and crows.

=== Food and feeding ===
Orioles feed on fruits, nectar, and insects. They are capable of dispersing the seeds of many berry-bearing plants including the invasive Lantana camara. An oriole has been recorded preying on southern flying lizards.

=== Threats ===
A protozoal blood parasite, Haemoproteus orioli, described from this species has been suggested to occur in many oriole species but may represent different lineages.
