= Karvalo =

Kannada novel

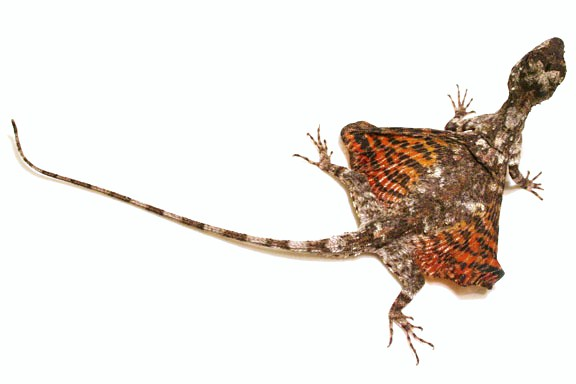
Draco volans

Karvalo, published as Carvalho in English, is a novel written by Poornachandra Tejaswi, a Kannada writer whose works include novels, short stories, non-fiction and poetry.

Tejaswi won the "most creative novel of the year" for Karvalo in 1980 from the Sahitya Akademi.

== Plot ==
In Karvalo, the protagonist is a well-educated farmer, who is also the narrator of the same story. In spite of his great interest in rural lifestyle, his unsuccessful agricultural work makes him thinking of leaving farming During this time he meets Karvalo, a middle aged scientist in search of a rare lizard. Their first few meetings were made to discuss the agricultural difficulties. A character named Mandanna, a local cowboy who is considered as a good-for-nothing fellow by the villagers and his friends, is very close to Karvalo. Karvalo tells the protagonist that Mandanna is his student in a way.

The farmer wonders why Mandanna and Karvalo become close and what the scientist finds so special in the local cowboy. As the story progresses, the farmer understands that the scientist finds that Mandanna possesses special skills of a Naturalist, such as observational skills to identify creatures. Karvalo often goes into the deep Jungle with Mandanna and this gets the small town talking about their relationship.

One day Karvalo reveals that the endangered flying Lizard Mandanna had seen, Draco dussumieri is an agamid "flying" lizard capable of gliding from tree to tree found in the Western Ghats and a relative of Draco blanfordii of China (SW Yunnan), E Thailand, W Malaysia, Myanmar, Vietnam, India and Bangladesh. Karvalo is interested in finding the lizard, previously thought to have been extinct.

The journey of these characters, the protagonist, Mandanna, a camera man and cook along with Karvalo to find the elusive lizard is the story of this novel. The series of discussions and revelations during the expedition gives a philosophical touch to the story, particularly the search for the truth of life.

== Bibliography ==
- Barts, M. & Wilms, T. 2003 Die Agamen der Welt. Draco 4 (14): 4-23
- Blanford, W.T. 1878 Notes on some Reptilia from the Himalayas and Burma. J. Asiat. Soc. Bengal (2) xlvii: 125-131
- Boulenger, G.A. 1885 Catalogue of the Lizards in the British Museum (Nat. Hist.) I. Geckonidae, Eublepharidae, Uroplatidae, Pygopodidae, Agamidae. London: 450 pp.
- McGuire, Jimmy A. & Heang, Kiew Bong 2001 Phylogenetic systematics of Southeast Asian flying lizards (Iguania: Agamidae: Draco) as inferred from mitochondrial DNA sequence data. Biological Journal of the Linnean Society 72: 203-229
