= Yug Charan =

Epithet for nationalistic writers

Yug Charan (IAST: Yuga Chāraṇa; Sanskrit: युग चारण) is an Indian title meaning ‘Charan of the Era’ for poets and litterateurs whose vivacious writings voice the nationalistic aspirations of the country. It may refer to:

== Literature ==
- Yuga Chāraṇa, a poetic work by Makhanlal Chaturvedi published in 1956.
- Maiṃ Yuga Chāraṇa, a collection of poems by Prakash Aatur published in 1983.

== Journalism ==
- Yug Charan, a press and a weekly newspaper published from Jaipur.

== People ==
- Bhartendu Harishchandra
- Hinglaj Dan Kaviya
- Kanhaiyalal Sethia
- Makhanlal Chaturvedi
- Manohar Sharma
- Padmanābha
- Ramdhari Singh Dinkar
- Ravidas
- Shrikrishna Saral

== See also ==
- Rashtrakavi (disambiguation)
- Kaviraja
