= Jugari Cross =

Novel by Poornachandra Tejaswi

- Author: Poornachandra Tejaswi
- Language: Kannada
- Genre: Fiction
- Published: 1994/2008 Pustaka Prakashana
- Publication place: India
- Media type: Print (Hardcover)
- Pages: 209
- ISBN: 9781450573528

Jugari Cross is a novel by Poornachandra Tejaswi, a writer from Kannada whose works include novels, short stories, non-fiction and poetry. Jugari Cross is a suspense thriller which happens around common incidents that occur in an ordinary farming couple's life. The story takes place in a 24 hour period, with a trace of history and a literary quest, but seriously provokes the reader to analyze the wider spectrum of philosophy, literature, and the principles of the global economy's impacts on the normal people.

== Characters ==
Suresha, Gouri, Sheshappa, Kutti, Rajappa, Doulath Rama, Kunta Rama, Jeevanlal, Dyawamma, Shastri
