= Sri Ramayana Darshanam =

Work by Kuvempu

- Cover of third edition (2011)
- Author: Kuvempu
- Language: Kannada
- Published: Vol. 1 (1949), Vol. 2 (1957)
- Publisher: University Of Mysore
- Publication place: India
- Media type: Print (Hardcover)
- Awards: Jnanpith Award (1967)
- ISBN: 9788126017287

Sri Ramayana Darshanam is the most popular work and the magnum opus by Kuvempu in Kannada based on the Hindu epic Ramayana. It earned him many distinctions including the Sahitya Akademi Award and the Jnanapeeth award in 1968.

== Theme ==
The theme is the well known story of Rama in Valmiki's Ramayana, transfigured in the poet's vision. The poet calls 'darshanam', it is the poet's realization that all the creation is caused, pervaded, sustained and governed by the cosmic mind. Abounding in metaphors and Homeric similes, introduced by the poet himself for the first time in Kannada, the epic brings home the truth that all beings, even the most wicked and sinful, are destined to evolve and ultimately attain perfection.

== Modifications to the story ==
Rama was born to Kaushalya and Dasharatha in Ayodhya, the ruler of the Kingdom of Kosala. His siblings included Lakshmana, Bharata, and Shatrughna. He married Sita. Though born in a royal family, their life is described in the Hindu texts as one challenged by unexpected changes such as an exile into impoverished and difficult circumstances, ethical questions and moral dilemmas. Of all their travails, the most notable is the kidnapping of Sita by demon-king Ravana, followed by the determined and epic efforts of Rama and Lakshmana to gain her freedom and destroy the evil Ravana against great odds. The entire life story of Rama, Sita and their companions allegorically discusses duties, rights and social responsibilities of an individual. It illustrates dharma and dharmic living through model characters.

== The fire-ordeal episode ==
The 'Agni-pravesha' (The fire-ordeal) episode illustrates the above statement. At Sita's command, Lakshmana makes a pyre for her and Sita mounts it. It is at this point that Kuvempu makes a startling deviation from Valmiki. The moment Sita has offered herself as supreme oblation to Agni, Rama too rushes after her, and enters the blazing flames, much to the shock of all earthly spectators. In a moment, however, Rama comes out of the fire holding Sita's palm in his right hand, and the spectators get a glimpse of their divinity. By this sensational innovation Kuvempu has proclaimed the great principle of the supremacy of the law, and the equality of all before the law, not excepting the law-giver himself. What is more, if this 'Agni-pravesha' is intended to reveal to all the world the truth of Sita's chastity, it is also intended to reveal Rama's fidelity and love for Sita.

== See also ==
- Kanuru Heggaditi and Malegalalli madumagalu, two novels written by Kuvempu
- Kannada literature
- Kannada poetry
- Rashtrakavi (meaning: National poet), a list of poets with the title
