= Rashtrakavi =

Rashtrakavi is an Indian title meaning "National Poet" and may refer to:

- Dursa Arha (1535–1655)
- Subramania Bharati (1882–1921)
- M. Govinda Pai (1883–1963)
- Maithili Sharan Gupt (1886–1965)
- Jhaverchand Meghani (1896–1947)
- Kuvempu (1904–1994)
- Harivansh Rai Bachchan (1907–2003)
- Ramdhari Singh Dinkar (1908–1974)
- Kavi Pradeep (1915–1998)
- G. S. Shivarudrappa (1926–2013)
- Balkavi Bairagi (1931–2018)

== See also ==
- Yug Charan
- Kaviraja
