= Vijayanagara literature =

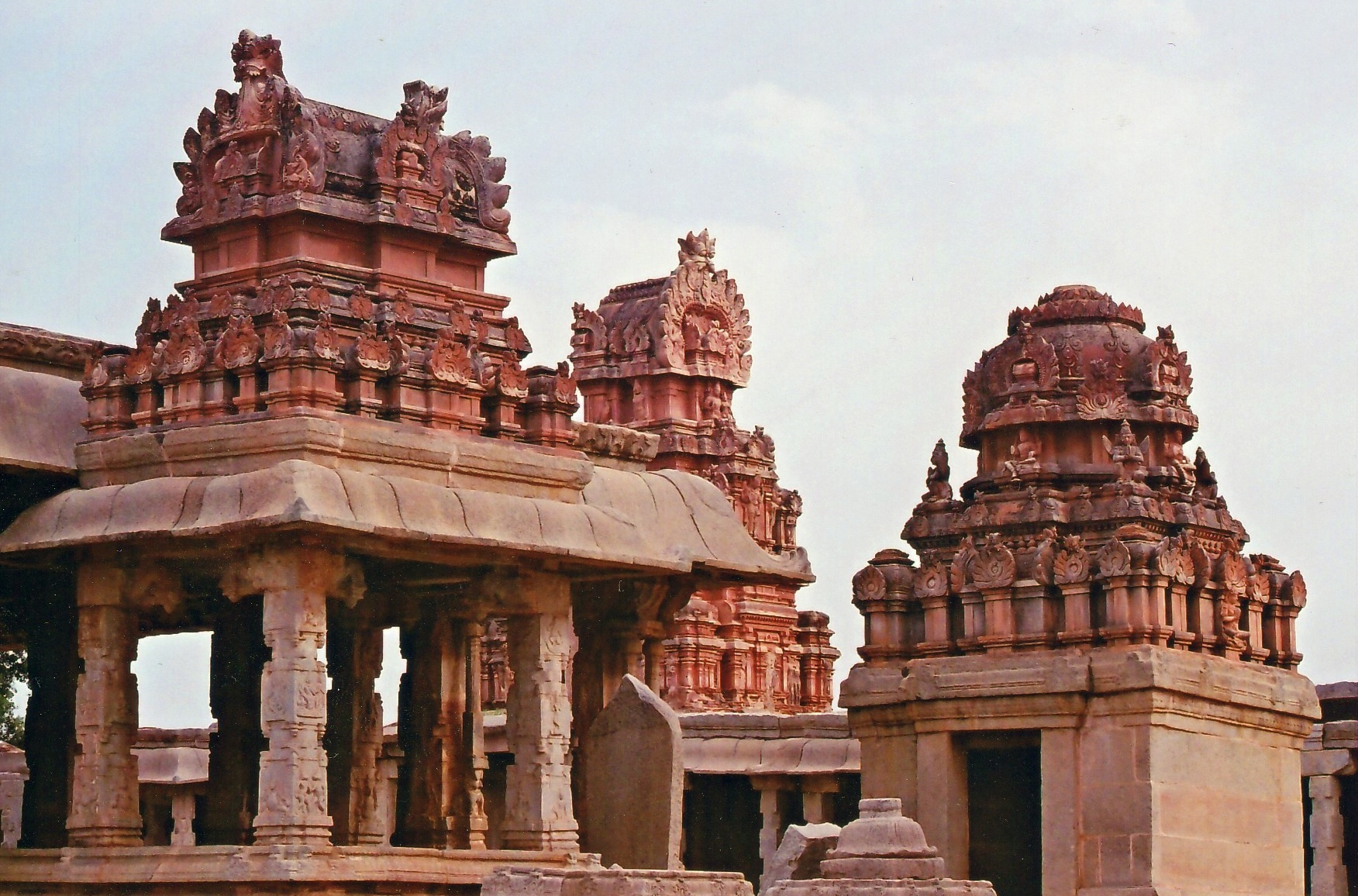
Chalukya pillars and Dravidian architecture

Vijayanagara literature was produced in the Vijayanagara Empire during a golden age of literature in South India in general. The rulers patronised Kannada, Telugu, Sanskrit and Tamil scholars who wrote in the Jain, Virashaiva and Vaishnava traditions. The period produced hundreds of works on all aspects of Indian culture, religion, biographies, prabhandas (stories), music, grammar, poetics and medicine. An attempt is made in this section to list the various poets and saints and their most famous works.

== Kannada ==
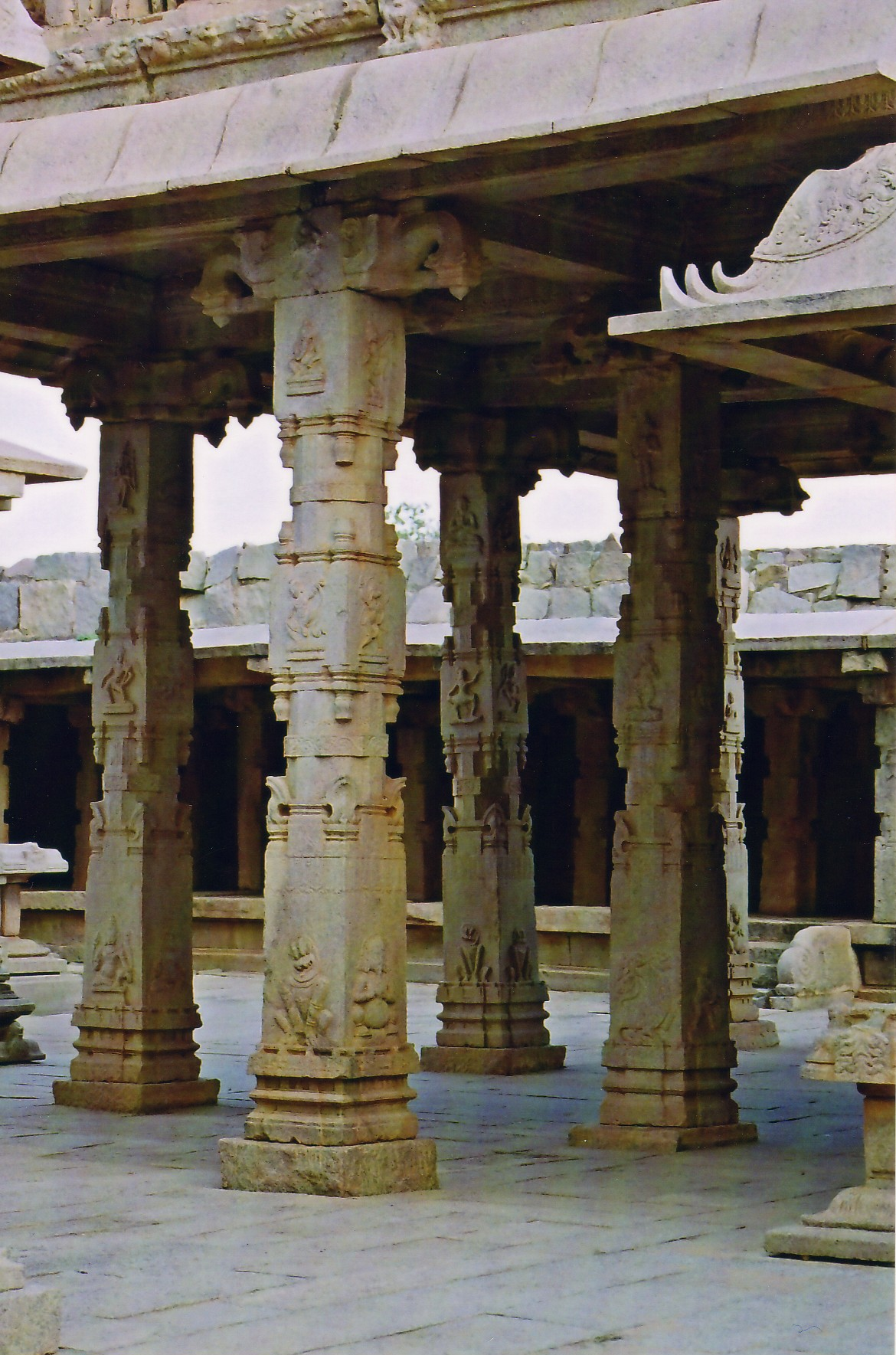
courtyard pillars Hampi

Kannada literature took a strong Hindu bent with the patronage of the Vijayanagara kings. Some eminent names were Kumara Vyasa, Narahari, BhimaKavi, Padmanaka, Mallanarya, Singiraja and Chamarasa.

=== Jain poets ===
Among Jaina poets, Madhura patronised by Harihara II and Deva Raya I wrote Dharmanathapurana, Vritta Vilasa wrote Dharmaparikshe and Sastrsara, Bhaskara of Penugonda who wrote Jinadharacharite (1424), Bommarasa of Terkanambi wrote Santakumaracharite and Kotesvara of Tuluvadesa wrote on the life of Jivandharaja in Shatpadi metre (seven line metre). Bahubali Pandita (1351) of Sringeri wrote the Dharmanathapurana. Jainism flourished in Tuluva country and there Abhinava Vadi Vidyananda wrote Kavyasara, Salva wrote Jaina version of Bharata in Shatpadi metre and Rasaratnakara, Nemanna wrote Jnanabhaskaracharite, Ratnakaravarni wrote Bharatesha Vaibhava, Triloka Sataka, Aparajitasataka and Someswara Sataka, Ayatavarma wrote Ratnakarandaka in Champu style (mixed prose-verse form), Vrittivilasa wrote Dharmaparikshe and Sastrasara, Kalyanakirti wrote the Jnanachandrabhyudaya (1439) and Vijayanna wrote the Dvadasanuprekshe (1448), Mangarasa III wrote Jayanripa-Kavya and other writings, Santarasa wrote Yogaratnakara.

=== Shaiva poets ===
Veerashaiva literature saw a renaissance during this period. Singiraja wrote Singirajapurana and Malabasavaraja Charitra, Mallanarya of Gubbi who was patronised by Krishnadevaraya wrote Veerasaivamrita Purana (1530), Bhavachintaratna (1513) and Satyendra Cholakathe. Deva Raya II patronised several Virashaivas like Lakkana Dandesa who wrote Shivatatwa Chintamani, Chamarasa who wrote Prabhulinga Leele, Jakkanarya wrote Nurondushthala. Guru Basava wrote seven works, six in Shatpadi metre called Saptakavya including the Shivayoganga Bhushana and the Avadhutagite. Shivagna Prasadi Mahadevayya and Halageyadeva were famous for their Shunya Sampadane.

Kallumathada Prabhuva, Jakkanna, Maggeya Mayideva, and Tontada Siddalingayati were other noted Vachanakaras (writers of Vachana poetry). Bhimakavi wrote Basavapurana (1369) and Padmanaka authored Padmarajapurana. Tontada Siddesvara, guru of Virupaksha Raya II authored 700 Vachanas called Shatsthalajnanamrita. Virakta Tontadarya wrote Siddhesvarapurana, Nijaguna Shivayogi wrote Anubhavasara, Sivayogapradipika and Vivekacintamani. Viruparaja wrote a Sangatya (literary composition to be sung with a musical instrument) on life of King Cheramanka, Virabhadraraja wrote five Satakas, a Virashaiva doctrine and morals and Virabhadra-Vijaya. Sarvajnamurti wrote Sarvajnapadagalu, Chandra Kavi wrote Virupakshasthana, Bommarasa wrote Saundara purana, Kallarasa wrote Janavasya (also called Madanakatilaka), Nilakhantacharya wrote Aradhyacharitra, Chaturmukha Bommarasa wrote Revanasiddhesvara Purana, Suranga Kavi wrote the Trisashti-Puratanara-Charitre giving an account of the 63 devotees of Shiva, Cheramanka wrote the Cheramankavya, Chennabasavanka wrote the Mahadeviyakkana-Purana, Nanjunda of Kikkeri wrote the Bhairavesvara Kavya, Sadasiva Yogi wrote the Ramanatha vilasa and Viarkta Tontadarya wrote the Siddesvara-Purana and other works, Virupaksha Pandita wrote Chennabasava-Prurana (1584).

=== Vaishnava poets ===
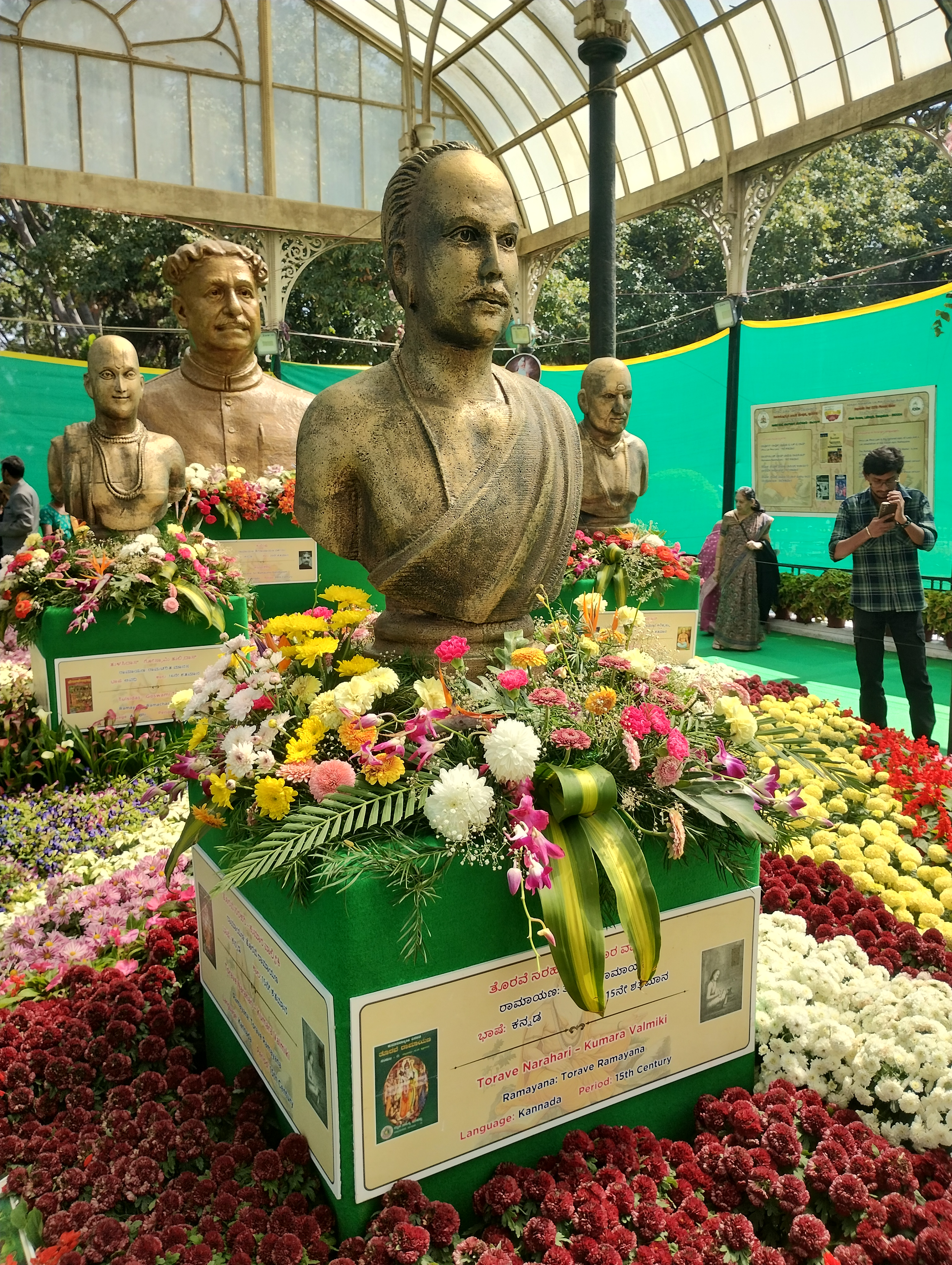
Bust of 15th-century poet Torave Narahari in Lal Bagh, Bangalore, in January 2025

Among Vaishnava scholars, Kumara Vyasa patronised by Deva Raya II wrote Gadugina Bharata. This was later completed by Timmanna Kavi as KrishnaRaya Bharata (patronised by king Krishnadevaraya), Narahari wrote Torave Ramayana. Other important works were Bhagavatha by Chatu Vittalanatha who was patronised by Krishnadevaraya and Achyuta Raya, Nala Charite, Haribhakthisara, Mohana Tarangini and Ramadhanya Charitre by the great saint Kanakadasa, Dasa Sahithya and Keerthanas and thousands of Devaranama by Purandaradasa Kanakadasa, Sripadaraya, Vyasatirtha and Vadirajatirtha. Nanjunda wrote Kumara Rama Charita, Kereya Padmarasa wrote Padmaraja Purana. Kanakadasa's Ramadhanya Charitre is considered a unique work on class struggle. Linganna wrote Keladinripavijayam and Kavi Malla wrote Manmathavijaya, Madhava wrote Madahaalankara (a translation of Dandi's Sanskrit Kayvadarsha), Isvara Kavi also known as Bana Kavi wrote Kavijihva-Bandhana (a work on prosody), Sadananda Yogi wrote portions of Bhagavata and Bharata, Tirumala Bhatta wrote the Sivagite and Thimma wrote Navarasalankara, Ramendra wrote the Saundarya-Katharatna (a metrical version in tripadi metre of Battisaputtalikathe). Krishnadevarayana Dinachari is a recent discovery. The Vijayanagara period continued the ancient tradition of Kannada literature.

=== Secular literature ===
King Deva Raya II was a poet and authored, in Kannada, the Sobagina Sone, a collection of romantic stories in the form of a narration by the author to his wife. Manjaraja I, a Jain, authored a book on toxicology called Khagendramanidarpana, Abhinava Chandra wrote on veterinary sciences in Asva-vaidya, Sridharadeva wrote a medical work called Vaidyamrita, Deparaja, a Virashiava, wrote a collection of romances called Sobagina-sone, Brahmin poet Manjaraja II wrote Manjaraja-Nighantu (1398), a metrical lexicon giving Kannada meanings of Sanskrit words, Lingamantri authored the lexicon Kabbigarakaipidi, Viarkta Tontadarya wrote the lexicon Karnatakasabdamanjari, and Devottama, a Jain, wrote a lexicon Nanartharatnakara.

== Telugu ==
=== Early Vijayanagara ===
The Vijayanagara period was the golden age of Telugu literature. Srinatha, who was respected as Kavi Sarvabhouma(king of poets) in Telugu, and patronised by many kings including the Kondavidu Reddy Kings, Velamas of Rachakonda and Deva Raya II of Vijayanagara wrote Marutratcharitra, Salivahana Saptasati, Panditaaradhyacharita, Sivaratri Mahatmya, Harivilasa, Bhimakanda, Kashikhandam, Shringara Naishadham, Palanati Veeracharitra, Sringaradipika and Kridabhiramam over the subjects of history and mythology.

Bammera Potana translated Bhagavata purana into Telugu and wrote Bhogini Dhandaka and VirabhadraVijaya. Vemana wrote Satakas, moral and social poems, that became colloquial Telugu phrases. Annamacharya, who was also patroned by Saluva Narasingaraya wrote hundreds of kirtanas in praise of Venkateswara of Tirupati., that became popular Telugu prayer songs. His wife and the first known Telugu poet, Tallapalka Timmakka wrote Subhadra Parinaya.

Mallayya and Singayya together wrote Varahapuranamu and Prabodhacandrodaya while Vishvanatha Nayani wrote Rayavachakamu. Nachanna Soma was patronised by Bukka Raya I. Virabhadra Kavi translated the Jaimini Bharata and Sringara Shakuntala. Prema Raju Jakkana wrote Vikramarkacharita, a eulogy of the great king of Ujjain, Duggapalli Duggaya wrote Naciketapakhyana, Durgagupta wrote Vishnupurana and Gaurana wrote Harishchandrapakhyana.

=== Late Vijayanagara ===
During the reign of Krishnadevaraya Telugu culture and literature flourished and reached their heyday. The great emperor was himself a poet having composed Amuktamalyada. In his court, eight Telugu poets were regarded as the eight pillars of the literary assembly. In the olden days, it was believed that eight elephants were holding the earth in eight different directions. The title Ashtadiggajas celebrates this belief and hence the court was also called Bhuvana Vijayam (Conquest of the World). The period of the Empire is known as "Prabandha Period," because of the quality of the prabandha literature produced during this time.

Among these eight poets, Allasani Peddana is considered to be the greatest and is given the title of Andhra Kavita Pitamaha (the father of Telugu poetry). Svarocisha Sambhava or Manucharita is his popular prabandha work and was dedicated to Krishnadevaraya. Nandi Thimmana wrote Parijathapaharanam. Madayyagari Mallana wrote Rajasekhara Charitramu. Dhurjati wrote Kalahasti Mahatyamu and Ayyalaraju Ramabhadrudu wrote Sakalakatha Sangraha and Ramaabhyudayamu. Pingali Surana wrote Raghava Pandaviyamu, Kalapurnodayam, Prabhavate Pradyamana. Raghavapandaveeyamu is a dual work with double meaning built into the text, describing both the Ramayana and the Mahabharata. Kalapurnodayam(means full bloom of art) has been treated as the first original poetic novel in Telugu literature. Battumurthy alias Ramarajabhushanudu wrote Kavyalankarasangrahamu, Vasucharitra, Narasabhupaliyam and Harischandranalopakhyanamu. Among these works the last one is a dual work which tells simultaneously the story of King Harishchandra and Nala and Damayanti. Tenali Ramakrishna first wrote Udbhataradhya Charitramu, a Shaivite work. However, he converted to Vaishnavism later and wrote Vaishnava devotional texts Panduranga Mahatmyamu, and Ghatikachala Mahatmyamu. Tenali Rama remains one of the most popular folk figures in India today, a quick-witted courtier ready even to outwit the all-powerful emperor.

Other well-known poets were Sankusala Nrisimha Kavi, who wrote KavikarnaRasayana, Chintalapudi Ellaya, who wrote Radhamadhavavilasa and Vishnumayavilasa, Molla, a poet wrote a version of Ramayana, Kamsali Rudraya wrote Nirankusopakhyana, and Addanki Gangadhara wrote Basavapurana. Manumanchi Bhatta wrote a scientific work called Hayalakshana Sastra.

== Sanskrit ==
Sanskrit literature was given patronage by the Vijayanagara kings. The early kings of the Sangama dynasty patronised the Sringeri saints while the Saluva and Tuluva kings patronised the Madhva saints of Udupi.

=== Advaita literature ===
The Sangama dynasty patronised the Advaita saints of the Sringeri order. Some important works from this period were Sayana's Vedartha Prakasha, Yajnatantra Sudhanidhi, Prayaschitra Sudhanidhi, Alankara Sudhanidhi, Yajnatantra Sudhanidhi, Sarvadarshanasangraha, Purushartha Sudhanidhi, many lesser manuals called Sudhanidhis treating expiation (Prayaschitta), Yagnatantra (vedic ritual) and Purushartha (aims of human endeavour). Madhva Vidyaranya, the spiritual force behind the founding empire wrote Parasara – Madhaviya, Rajakatenirnaya, Vivaranapremayasangarha and Jivanmuktiviveka, Bharathitirtha wrote Pancadasi, Sangitasara. Anandapurna wrote commentaries on KhandanaKhandakhadya, Brahmasiddhi, Vivarana and Nyayachandrika. . Isavara Dikshita patronised by Krisnhadevaraya wrote two commentaries on the Ramayana, a Laghu and a Brihad Vivarana in Hemakuta.

Appaya Dikshita(1554–1626), a devotional poet wrote commentaries on various schools of philosophies including Srikantha's Saivite Advaita. He was patroned by king Chinna Bomman of Vellore, a subject of emperor Aliya Rama Raya. Some of his works are Siva Karnamitra and Sivarka Manideepiaka.

Vallabhacharya(1479–1531), a great poet-philosopher and the fame of the Madhurastakam was patroned by Krishnadevarya and had written many other works like Vyasa Sutra Bhashya, Jaimini Sutra Bhasya, Bhagavata Tika Subodhini, Pushti Pravala Maryada and Siddhanta Rahasya in Sanskrit. He also stayed at Kashi and other places in India, and so it is not known whether all of his works were done during his stay at Vijayanagara.

=== Dvaita literature ===
Many of the Madhwa haridasas of the Udupi order not only held positions of "rajguru" to Vijayanagara kings, they also wrote several works of dvaita vedanta. Among them were Jayatirtha, Sripadaraya, Vyasatirtha.

Vyasatirtha (1460–1539), saint, esteemed master of religious discourse, follower of Tattvavada, philosophical school of thought (disciple of Srimad Ananda Tîrtha) wrote several works including Nyayamrita, Tarkatandava, and Tatparyachandrika, collectively known as Vyasa-Traya. Some other notable works from him are Bhedojjivana and Mandaramanjari commentaries. He was patronized by Saluva Narasimha at Chandragiri and later became a "rajguru" to Krishnadevaraya. He was also the Guru of Purandaradasa and Kanakadasa, two outstanding luminaries of the Haridasa tradition, the former also the founder of modern Carnatic music.

Vadirajatirtha who was rajguru to Saluva Narasimha Deva Raya wrote Yuktimallika (a doctrine meant to critique the works of Sankaracahrya). Other prominent haridasas were Jayatirtha who earned the title Tikacharya (wrote two polemics namely Nyayasudha, Vadavali), Raghottamatirtha and Vijayindratirtha.

=== Secular literature ===
Vidyaranya of Sringeri wrote Sangitasara, a treatise on music. Kallinatha patronised by Mallikarjuna Raya wrote on music and his grandson Rama Amatya who was patronised by Aliya Rama Raya also wrote Svaramelakalanidhi on music.

Praudha Devaraya wrote Ratiratna Pradipika, a book on erotics. Sayana wrote Dhātuvṛtti, a book of Sanskrit grammar. Sayana also wrote Ayurveda Sudhanidhi, on traditional Indian medicine. Lakshmana Pandita wrote another medicine book Vaidyaraja Vallabham.

Anandapurana Vidyasagara of Gokarna wrote Vyakhyaratnavali during the rule of Harihara II. Peda komati of Kondavidu wrote two works on poetics and music called Sahityachintamani and Sangitachintamani. Komati's predecessor Kumaragiri of Kondavidu, whose wife Lakumadevi is a dancer, wrote Vasantarajeeyam, a work on dance. Simhabhupala of Rachakonda wrote Rasarnavasudhakara a treatise on rasa and rules of dramaturgy. His court poet Visvesvara wrote Chamatkarachandrika a work on rhetoric. Vamana Bhatta wrote Sabhda Ratnakara, a dictionary with phonetics. Vallabhacharya wrote Lilavati Ganita, a treatise on mathematics.

=== Biographies and history ===
A family of poets called Dindimas from north Arcot flourished from Harihara I to Achuta Devaraya. Rajanatha Dindima II wrote Saluvabhyudayam (poems on the wars of Saluva Narasimha), Rajanatha Dindima III wrote Achyutabhyudaya (also called as Achyutarayabhyudaya) on king Achyuta Raya. Gowda Dindima was a well-known poet during this time and was defeated by Srinatha, scholar in Telugu as well as Sanskrit.

Devanna Bhatta wrote Smriti Chandrika. Gangamba Devi, a poet and queen wrote Madhura Vijayam, on her husband Kamparayalu's victory over Madurai Sultanate. Tirumalamba Devi, also a poet wrote Varadambika Parinayam on Achyutadevaraya's marriage.

=== Other famous works from South India ===
Some of the kings themselvers are scholars. Krishnadevaraya who patronised many poets, himself an accomplished scholar wrote Madalasa Charita, Satyavadu Parinaya and Rasamanjari and Jambavati Kalyana. King Devaraya I wrote Mahanataka Sudhanidhi. king Saluva Narasimha wrote Ramabhyudayam.

Vamana Bhatta Bana patronised by Reddy king Pedda Komati Vema of Kondavidu wrote Vemabhupalacharita, Nalabhyudaya, Raghunathacharitakavya, Parvathiparaniya and Kanakalekha Kalyana. Pedda Komati himself authored Amarusataka and Saptasati sara (a selection of 100 verses from king Hala's Prakrit anthology). Katayavema wrote commentaries on plays by Kalidasa.

== Tamil ==
Krishnadevaraya also patronised Tamil poet Harihara who wrote Irusamaya vilakkam (an exposition on saivism and Vaishnavism). Other Tamil poets of the Vijayanagara era were Arunagirinathar who some scholars believe was a descendant of Dindima Kavis. Oottukkadu Venkata Kavi (1700–65) actually salutes him as Dindima Kavi in his composition, Bhajanamrta paramananda in Nattai. Arunagirinathar wrote Tiruppukal containing more than 1360 songs in various meters and several songs in praise of Murugan, Svarupananda Deshika who wrote an anthology on the philosophy of Advaita in his Sivaprakasap Perundirattu and many poems like Paduturai, Nanavinoda Kalambakam, Mohavadaipparani and Annavadaipparani. His pupil Tattuvaraya who wrote a short anthology called Kurundirattu, Pugalendi, Jnanprakashar, Andari, Kacchiyappa Shivacharya wrote Kandapuranam and Ilanjuriyar were also patronised.
