= Amuktamalyada =

16th century Telugu epic poem

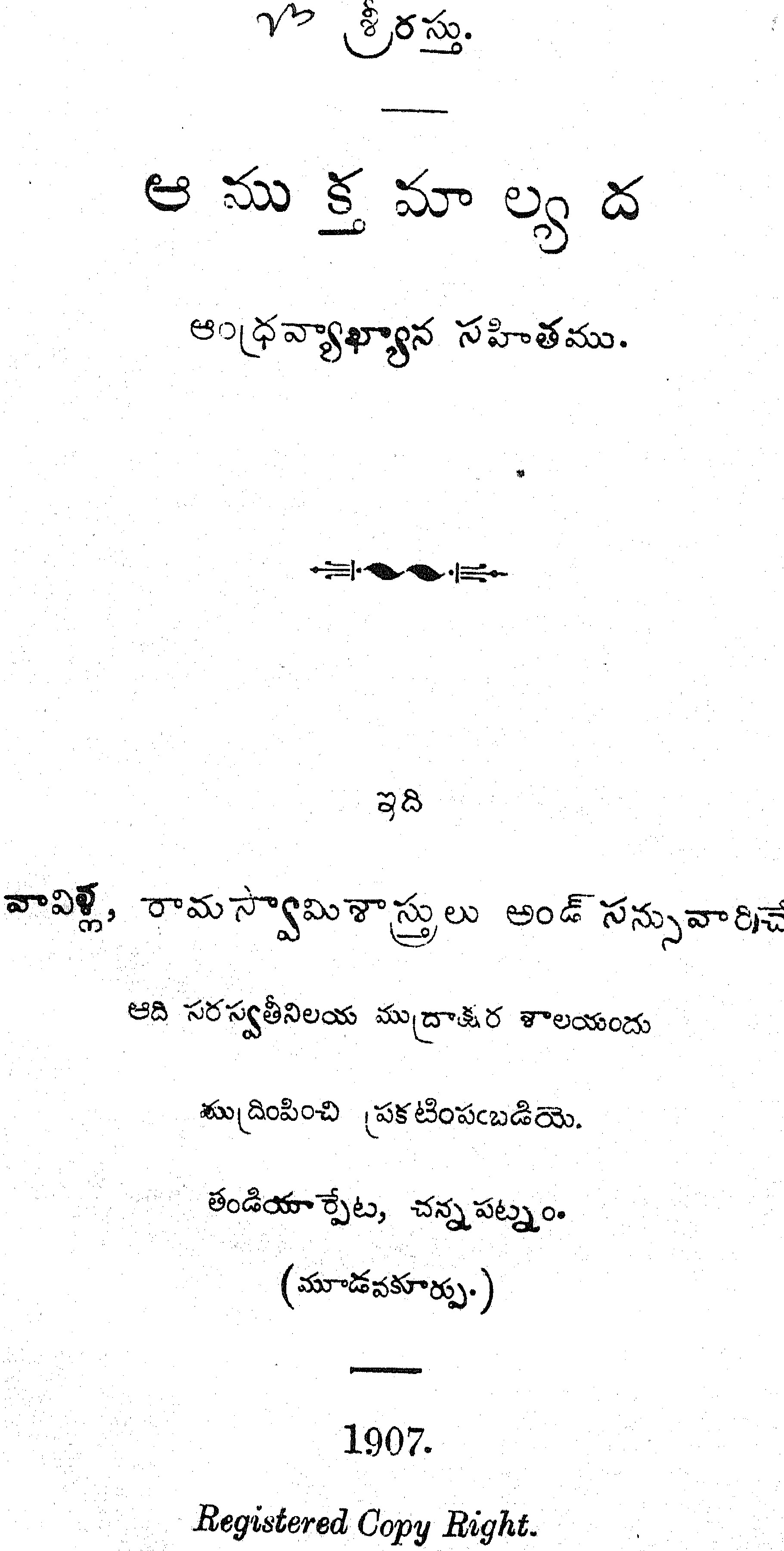
- Title page of 1907 Edition
- Author: Krishnadevaraya
- Original title: ఆముక్తమాల్యద
- Language: Telugu
- Genre: Epic poetry
- Publication date: 1509–1530
- Publication place: India

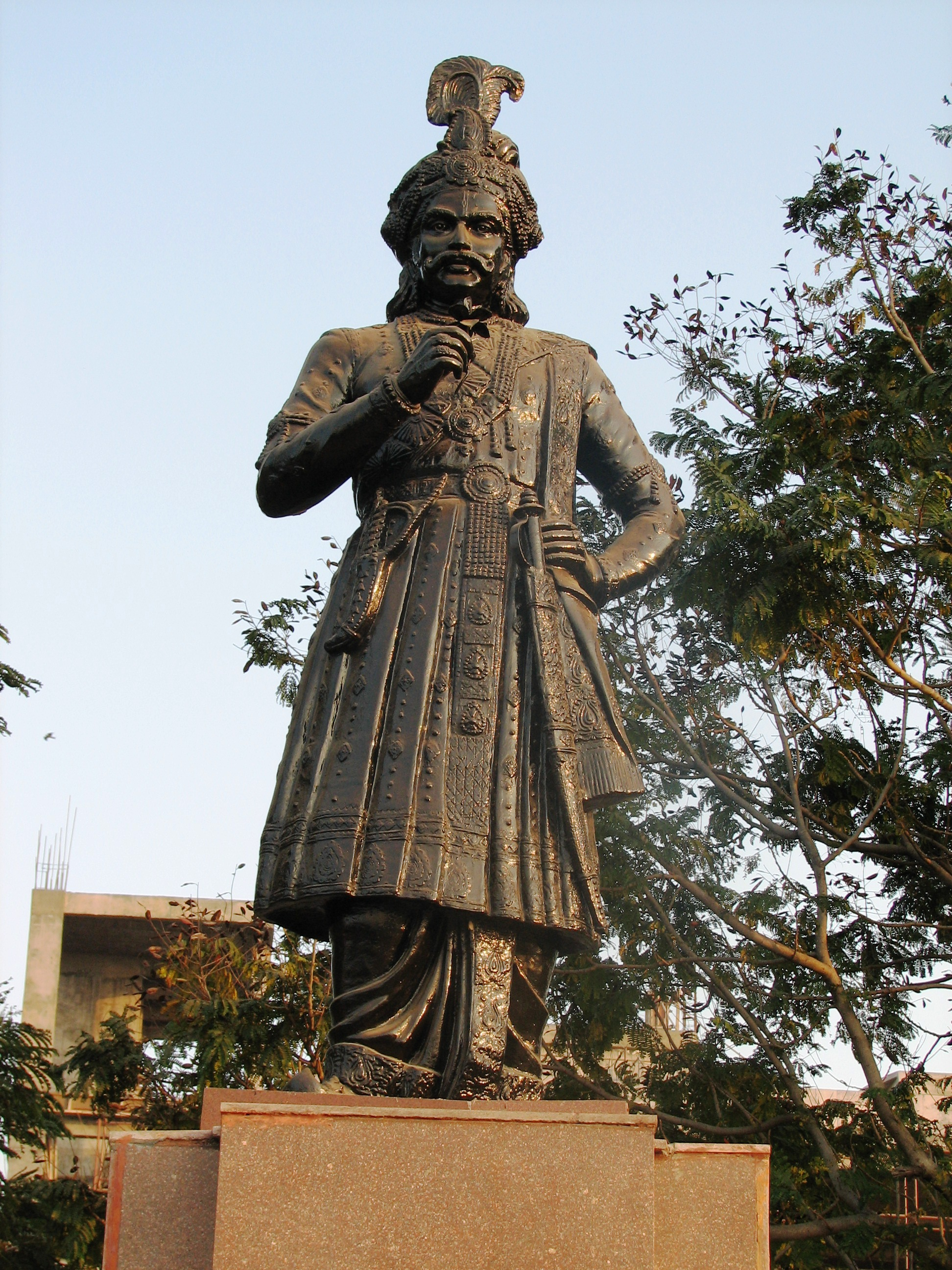
Krishnadevaraya

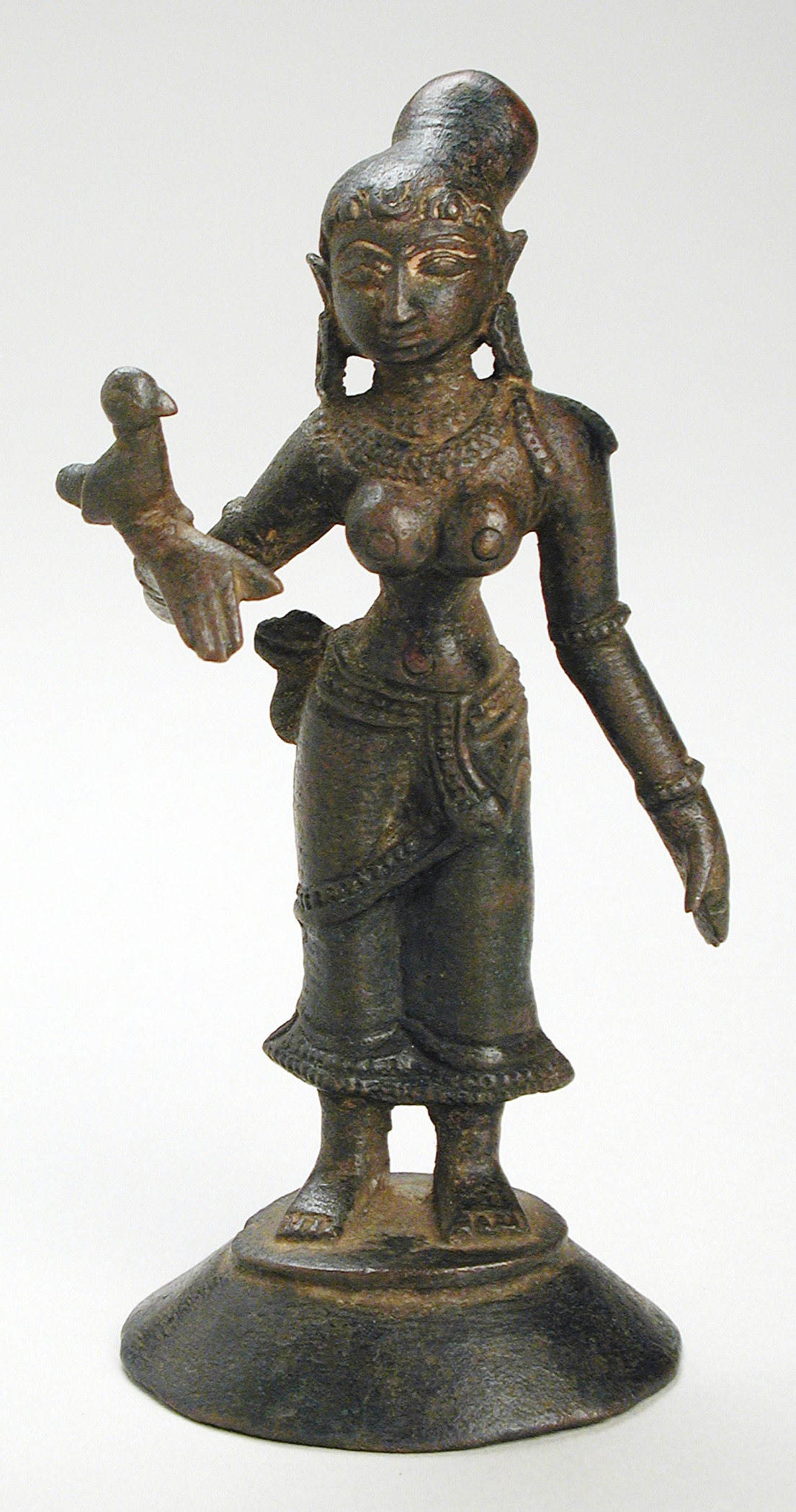
Saint Andal (14th Century, Madurai), at the Los Angeles County Museum of Art

The Āmuktamālyada (Telugu: ఆముక్తమాల్యద) is a Telugu epic poem composed by Krishnadevaraya, the ruler of the Vijayanagara Empire, in the early 16th century. Amuktamalyada translates to "One who offered the garland after wearing it herself". Considered as a masterpiece, the Amuktamalyada describes the legendary wedding of the Hindu deity Ranganayaka, an avatar of Vishnu, and Andal, one of the poet-saints called the Alvars, at Srirangam gives insight into the religious, political and cultural settings of Vijaynagar empire. It is a treatise on polity and administration.

== Krishnadevaraya ==
Krishnadevaraya was the king of the Vijayanagara Empire reigning between 1509–1530. He was the third ruler of the Tuluva Dynasty, and presided over the Vijayanagara empire at its zenith. Krishna Deva Raya earned the titles of Andhra Bhoja (transl. Bhoja of Andhra) and Mooru Rayara Ganda (transl. King of three kings). He became the dominant ruler of the peninsula of India by defeating the Sultans of Bijapur, Golconda, the Bahmani Sultanate and the Gajapati Kingdom of Orissa.

Krishnadevaraya during his reign patronised many Kannada, Telugu and Sanskrit poets. His court had 8 Telugu poets (Astadiggajalu) - Allasani Peddana, Nandi Thimmana, Madayyagari Mallana, Dhurjati, Ayyala-raju Rama-Bhadrudu, Pingali Surana, Ramaraja Bhushanudu and Tenali Rama Krishna. The Kannada poets Mallanarya who wrote Bhava-chinta-ratna and Satyendra Chola-kathe and Chatu Vittal-anatha who wrote Bhagavata also enjoyed his patronage. The Tamil poet Haridasa and Tamil literature were patronised by Krishnadevaraya. The Sanskrit poet Vyasatirtha who wrote Bhedo-jjivana, Tat-parya-chandrika, Nyaya-mrita (a work directed against Advaita philosophy) and Tarka-tandava enjoyed his patronage. Krishnadevaraya was himself an accomplished Sanskrit scholar and wrote Madalasa Charita, Satyavadu Parinaya, Rasamanjari and Jambavati Kalyana.

== Andal ==
Andal was the only woman among the twelve Vaishnava Tamil poet-saints known as the Alvars. According to tradition, Andal was born in Srivilliputtur. She was found as an infant, abandoned under a basil (Tulasi - Ocimum tenuiflorum) tree, by Vishnucitta (or Periyalvar) who himself was an Alvar poet. It is said that Periyalvar recocognised the child as Bhudevi, the consort of Vishnu (p. 36). Active in the 7th-century, Andal is credited with the Tamil works, Tiruppavai and Nachiyar Tirumoli, which are still recited by devotees during the winter festival season of Margali. Andal is known for her unwavering devotion to Vishnu, the supreme being of the Sri Vaishnava tradition. The Srivilliputhur Temple in Tamil Nadu is dedicated to her, marking her birthplace.

Some of Andal's verses express love for Vishnu, written with bold sensuality and startlingly savage longing, hunger and inquiry, that even today many of her most erotic poems are rarely rendered publicly.

== Work ==
It is believed that Krishnadevaraya wrote the work, after getting a dream in the portico of the Srikakulam Andhra Maha Vishnu temple, in the Srikakulam Village (today's Krishna District) on the banks of river Krishna, in which Vishnu appeared and instructed him to write the story of his wedding to Andal at Srirangam in Telugu. In his dream, on being asked why Telugu was chosen, Vishnu is said to have replied:

Teluga dēla yenna dēśambu delugēnu
telugu vallabhuṇḍa telugokaṇḍa
yella nr̥pulu goluva nerugavē bāsāḍi
dēśabhāṣalandu telugu les'sa

If you ask, 'Why Telugu?' It is because this is Telugu country and I am a Telugu king. Telugu is sweet. After speaking with all the kings that serve you, didn’t you realize - amongst all the languages in the country, Telugu is the best!

Amuktamalyada describes the pain of separation (viraha) experienced by Andal, who is described as the incarnate of Lakshmi, the consort of Vishnu. The poem describes Andal's beauty in 30 verses written in the keśādi-pādam style, starting from her hair, going down her body till her feet.
