= Mahamantri Timmarusu (film) =

- Theatrical release poster
- Directed by: Kamalakara Kameswara Rao
- Screenplay by: Kamalakara Kameswara Rao
- Story by: Pingali Nagendra Rao
- Dialogue by: Pingali Nagendra Rao
- Produced by: N. Ramabrahmam; A. Pundarikakshayya
- Starring: N. T. Rama Rao; Devika; Gummadi
- Cinematography: Annayya
- Edited by: Kandaswamy
- Music by: Pendyala Nageswara Rao
- Production company: Gowtami Productions
- Release date: 26 July 1962
- Running time: 170 mins
- Country: India
- Language: Telugu

Mahamantri Timmarusu is a 1962 Indian Telugu-language historical drama film directed by Kamalakara Kameswara Rao. It stars N. T. Rama Rao, Devika, Gummadi with music composed by Pendyala Nageswara Rao. The film was produced by N. Ramabrahmam, A. Pundarikakshayya under the Gowtami Productions banner. The film won the President's silver medal for Best Feature Film in Telugu at the 10th National Film Awards.

== Plot ==
During the reign of the Vijayanagara Empire, the King Tuluva Narasa Nayaka has 3 sons Viranarasimha Raya, Krishnadevaraya & Achyuta Deva Raya. Before his death, he crowns his eldest Viranarasimha Raya inept, who ruses to assassinate Krishnadevaraya via Chief Minister Timmarasu / Appaji. However, he detects that Krishnadevaraya is apt to succeed in establishing a mighty society. So, he covetously raises him under the light of love as a gallant, and the two share a tremendous adoration. Timmarasu does it all in favor of Krishnadevaraya by upholding the satraps and fixing his alliance with Srirangapatnam's heir Tirumala Devi to expand the kingdom. Before it, Krishnadevaraya pushes him into a dichotomy by knitting a dancer, Chinna Devi, but it resolves with her acceptance. Presently, the grand coronation of Sri Krishnadevaraya happens with the wedding to Tirumala Devi. At that moment, everyone is astonished since Timmarasu slaps the emperor to remind him about the kickbacks while sitting on the crown.

Besides, Prataparudra Deva of the Gajapati Empire always scorns and denounces Krishnadevaraya with his son Veerabhadra. Hence, he annexes without knowledge of Timmarasu and triumphs Kondaveedu, Udayagiri and proceeds to Cuttack. Being conscious of it, Timmarasu walks to shield Raya with the forces. Additionally, he misleads Veerabhadra by conveying details of Krishnadevaraya's arrival, who ploys to seize him. It is opposed by his sibling Annapurna Devi noticing it, Krishnadevaraya falls for her. Anyhow, Timmarasu's counterstrike beats & imprisons Veerabhadra. It makes Prataparudra fearful when his vicious & sly sibling Hamvira Deva schemes and acquits Veerabhadra owing to the peace treaty. Nevertheless, they plot by surrounding Krishnadevaraya with their 16 vassals when Timmarasu’s wit creates enmity between them and sets Pratap Rudra to slaughter his vassals. Moreover, Pratapa Rudra offers Annapurna's hand to Krishnadevaraya in a political dialogue. Soon after, he wiles to kill him via Annapurna, which she cannot do and attempts self-sacrifice. Timmarasu bars and welcomes Annapurna as his daughter, discerning her clear heart. Hearing it, Pratapa Rudra lets down when Hamvira pledges to ruin Krishnadevaraya's clan silently and amicably sets foot at Hampi.

Time passes, and Krishnadevaraya & Annapurna are blessed with Tirumala Raya, whom Timmarasu is training as a perfectionist. Periodically, Hamvira attempts to break the stick of Krishnadevaraya & Timmarasu and seeks to spoil Annapurna's brain. Although it sounds in Timmarasu's mind, he waits for a shot. Meanwhile, Krishnadevaraya announced warfare in the Bahmani Sultanate when Hamvira pesters him via Annapurna to crown Tirumala Raya before his move. Timmarasu denies it as it is not on time. Exploiting it, Hamvira slays Tirumala Raya by poisoning and incriminating Timmarasu. Now, he is declared guilty before the judiciary when the emperor edicts the plucking of his eyes. Here, Timmarasu feels proud of Krishnadevaraya’s unbiased ruling. Devastated, Krishnadevaraya rovers as an insane when Veerabhadra & Hamvira's ruse to butcher him and the truth comes to light. Krishnadevaraya rushes to secure Timmarasu, ceasing the baddies, but it's too late. At last, remorseful Krishnadevaraya begs for pardon and admits his sin in the court. Finally, the movie ends with the two continuing their deep reverence.

== Based on the novel Appaji by Sri Prasad ==
The screenplay and story by Pingali Nagendra Rao were inspired by a popular Telugu novel, Appaji, by the best-selling writer of historical fiction, Prasad (Palaparthy Ramaprasad). It was serialized in the Telugu weekly Vijaya, and subsequently published by Navajyoti Publishers.

== Cast ==
- N. T. Rama Rao as Sri Krishnadeva Raya
- Devika as Annapurna Devi
- Gummadi as Timmarusu
- Relangi as Timmanna
- Mikkilineni as Pemmasani Ramalinga Nayudu
- Mukkamala as Prataparudra Deva Gajapati
- Dhulipala as Allasani Peddana
- Mudigonda Lingamurthy as Hamvira Deva
- Prabhakar Reddy as Veerabhadra Gajapati
- Shobhan Babu as Govinda Rayalu
- S. Varalakshmi as Tirumala Devi
- L. Vijayalakshmi as Chinna Devi
- Rajasree as Kandoli
- Radha Kumari as Krishnaveni

== Soundtrack ==
Mahamantri Timmarusu

Film score by Pendyala Nageswara Rao
- Released: 1962
- Genre: Soundtrack
- Length: 25:37
- Producer: Pendyala Nageswara Rao

Music composed by Pendyala Nageswara Rao. Lyrics were written by Pingali Nagendra Rao. Music released on Audio Company.

S. No	Song title	Singers	length
1	"Jaya Jaya Jaya"	P. Leela	3:45
2	"Jayavani Charana Kamala"	Ghantasala, P. Leela	5:01
3	"Leela Krishna Nee Leelalu"	S. Varalakshmi	2:48
4	"Mohana Raagamaha"	Ghantasala, P. Susheela	3:13
5	"Tadhastu Swamula Kolavandi"	Ghantasala, P. Leela	2:20
6	"Tirumala Tirupati Venkateswara"	S. Varalakshmi, P. Susheela	4:01
7	"Jaya Anare Jaya Anare"	P. Leela	3:00
8	"Andhra Deva"	P. Leela	3:29

== Awards ==
National Film Awards

- 1962: President's silver medal for Best Feature Film in Telugu
