= Tirumala Devi =

- Princess of Srirangapattana; Patta Manishi
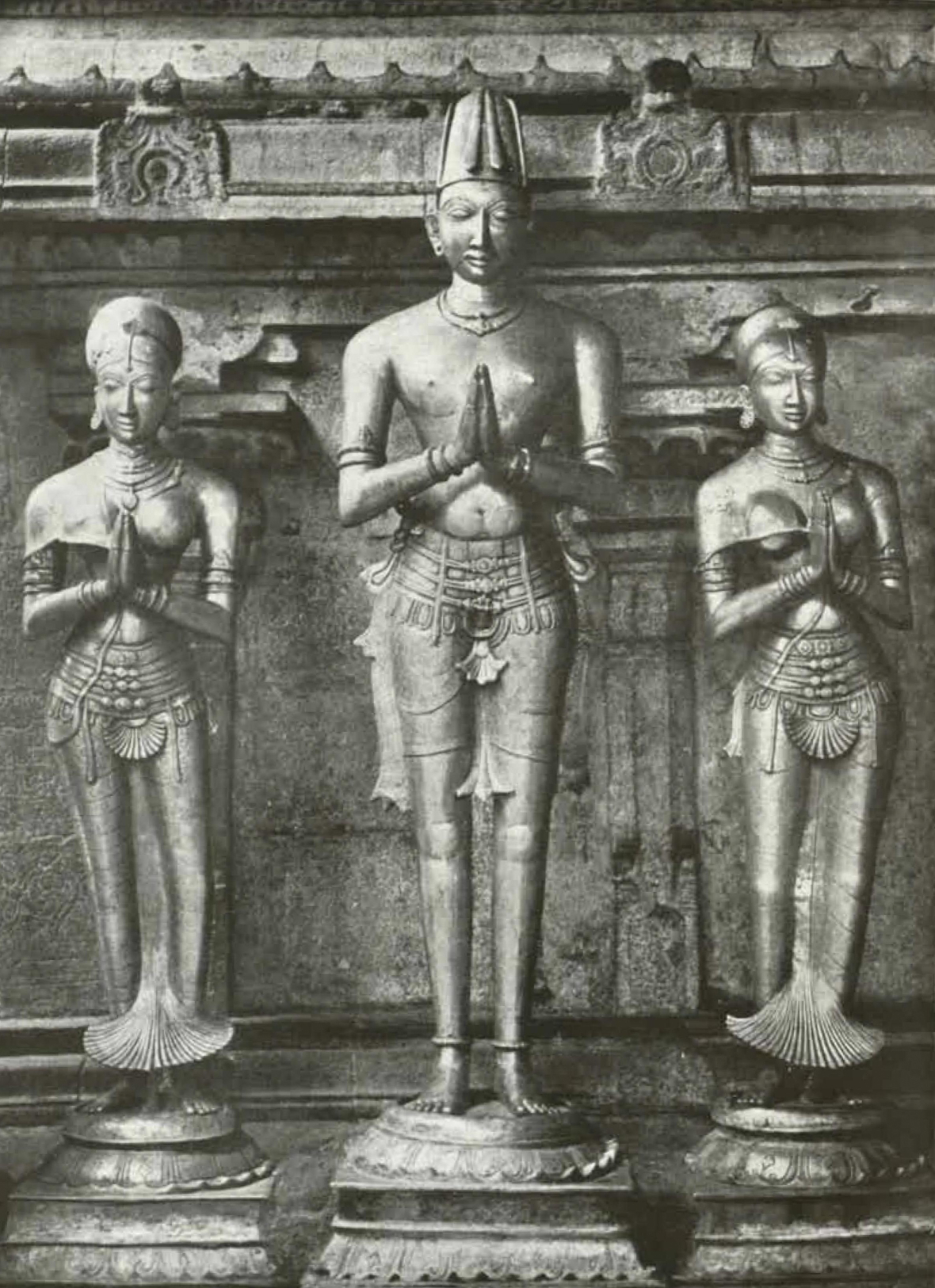
- Krishnadevaraya with his two wives Tirumala Devi and Chinna Devi. Tirumala Devi is on the right. ca. 1518.

Empress Consort of the Vijayanagara Empire
- Tenure: 8 August 1509 – 17 October 1529
- Predecessor: Unknown
- Successor: Tirumalamba
- Born: c. 1474; Srirangapattana, Vijayanagara Empire
- Died: c. 1553 (Aged: 79); Hampi, Vijayanagara Empire
- Spouse: Krishnadevaraya
- Issue: Tirumalumba; Tirumala Raya
- House: Tuluva (by marriage)
- Father: King Veerappa Gowda
- Religion: Hinduism

Tirumala Devi (also known as Tirumalamba) (died 1553) was the senior wife and chief empress (patta mahishi) of Emperor Krishnadevaraya, who is considered to be the greatest ruler of the Vijayanagara Empire. She was also the most honoured wife of Krishnadevaraya, and the mother of his heir-apparent, Prince Tirumala, who died in his childhood.

By birth, Tirumala Devi was a princess of Srirangapattana, a sub-kingdom of the Vijayanagara Empire, which was ruled by her father Veerappa Gowda.

== Marriage ==
Tirumala Devi was one of the daughters of King Veerappa Gowda, who ruled Srirangapattana. Krishnadeva Raya placed Veerappa Gowda as the governor of Srirangapattana after defeating the rebellious Ummattur chief in 1512 AD. Tirumala Devi was married to Krishnadevaraya most probably in 1498 and was crowned as his chief empress upon his accession to the Vijayanagara throne in 1509. Tirumala Devi lived on for the entire period of her husband's reign and accompanied him constantly. She also played a dominant role during this period as the chief empress and accompanied Krishnadevaraya during his military campaigns, including the Kalinga war.

Tirumala Devi was very much interested in poetry. She had her own treasury, her own female servants and she had complete independence, she was also a great devotee and a great donor. As she was Krishnadevaraya's favourite, she enjoyed all the power and privileges in the court.

Nandi Thimmana (popularly known as Mukku Timmana), the celebrated Telugu poet and one of the Astadiggajas at Krishnadevaraya's court, was a gift from Tirumala Devi's father to his son-in-law. Mukku Timmana was the second great poet of the imperial court after Allasani Peddana. His life-work Parijatapaharana (which occupies a very high place in Telugu literature) was dedicated to Krishnadevaraya and composed to resolve a fight between Krishnadevaraya and Tirumala Devi.

Tirumala Devi was the most honoured wife of Krishnadevaraya. The suburb of Tirumala-devi pattana (around the present Sannakki Veerabhadra temple in Hospet) was laid out during the reign of Krishnadevaraya in honour of Tirumala Devi, while Nagalpura was named after Krishnadevaraya's mother in law Nagala Devi.

=== Issue ===
Tirumala Devi bore Krishnadevaraya three children: a daughter and two sons. The daughter, Tirumalamba married Araviti Ranga's son, Ramaraya who, after the marriage, came to be known as Aliya Rama Raya.

Tirumala, the eldest son and heir-apparent was born in 1518. On this occasion, Krishnadevaraya and Tirumala Devi paid a visit to Venkateswara Temple in Tirumala on 16 October 1518. The prince, however, died young. The death of his heir seems to have greatly unsettled Krishnadevaraya and the last five years of his reign were somewhat disturbed and unhappy on this account, during which period the administration was carried on, in his name, by his brother Achyuta Deva Raya.

One more son was born to Tirumala Devi towards the end of Krishnadevaraya's life time. His name was according to some sources, Ramachandra. He also died young, at the age of eighteen months.

=== Dowager empress ===
As dowager empress Tirumala Devi proposed to crown Rama Raya as 'Son-in-law Regnant'.

== Philanthropy ==
A highly religious woman, Tirumala Devi is known for her religious and charitable donations to various temples in South India. In 1514, Tirumala Devi presented a costly Chakrapadakam to Venkateswara Temple in Tirumala and granted Pirattikulattur village for five Tirupponakam offerings to be made daily.

== In popular culture ==
- Tirumala Devi was portrayed by actress Sandhya in B. S. Ranga's film Tenali Ramakrishna (1956).
- A fictionalized Tirumala Devi is portrayed by Priyanka Singh in SAB TV's television series Tenali Rama.
