= Krishnadevaraya =

Emperor of Vijayanagara from 1509 to 1529

- Maharajadhiraja; Kannada Rajya Rama Ramana; Andhra Bhoja; Dakshinasamudradhiswara; Mooru Rayara Ganda; Abhinava-Bhoja; Gaubrahmana Pratipalaka
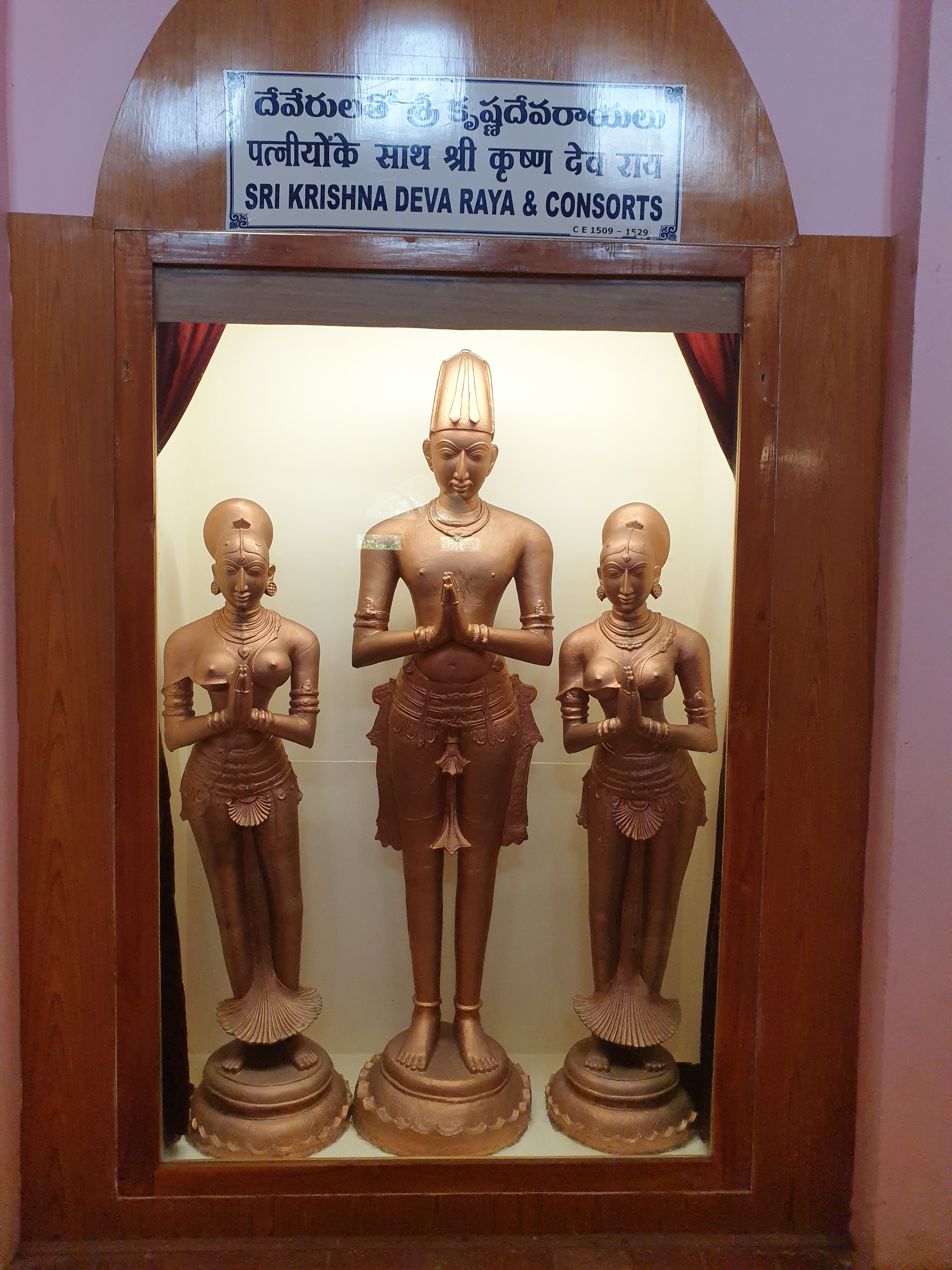
- Sculpture of Krishnadevaraya and his wives at Chandragiri Museum

Emperor of Vijayanagara
- Reign: 26 July 1509 – 17 October 1529
- Coronation: 23/24 January 1510 (Note: According to an inscription at a temple in Hampi, Krishnadevaraya's coronation was on 14 Magha 1431 Shaka Samvat. However, this tithi (lunar day) falls on both 23 and 24 January 1510.)
- Predecessor: Viranarasimha Raya
- Successor: Achyuta Deva Raya
- Born: 17 January 1471; Vijayanagara, Vijayanagara Empire (present-day Hampi, Karnataka, India)
- Died: 17 October 1529 (aged 58); Vijayanagara, Vijayanagara Empire (present-day Hampi, Karnataka, India)
- Consort: Tirumala Devi; Chinna Devi; Annapurna Devi
- Issue: Tirumalumba (from Tirumala Devi); Vengalamba (from Chinna Devi); Tirumala Raya (from Tirumala Devi)(Crowned in 1524 at the age of 6 years, but died on 1525)
- Dynasty: Tuluva
- Father: Tuluva Narasa Nayaka
- Mother: Nagala Devi
- Religion: Sri Vaishnavism
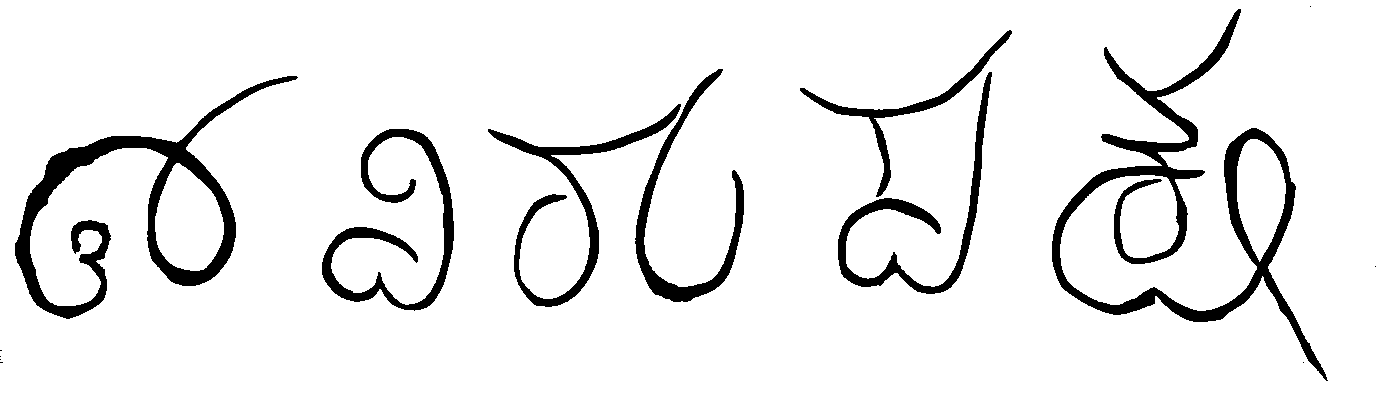
- Signature
- Military career
- Allegiance: Vijayanagara Empire
- Service years: 1509–1529
- Conflicts: See list: Krishnadevaraya's Deccan Expedition; Battle of Diwani; Battle of Koilkonda; Capture of Raichur; Siege of Gulbarga; Siege of Bidar; Vijayanagara–Gajapati War; Siege of Udayagiri; Siege of Kondavidu; Battle of Meduru; Capture of Kondavidu; Capture of Kondapalli; Conquest of Kalinga; Battle of Raichur

Krishnadevaraya (17 January 1471 – 17 October 1529) was emperor of the Vijayanagara Empire from 1509 to 1529 and the third ruler of the Tuluva dynasty. Widely regarded as one of the greatest rulers in Indian history, he presided over the empire at its political and cultural zenith and is remembered as an iconic figure by many Indians. Following the decline of the Delhi Sultanate, he ruled the largest and most powerful empire in India during his time.

Krishnadevaraya's reign was marked by military expansion and political consolidation. He became the dominant ruler of the Indian peninsula by defeating the sultans of Bijapur, Golconda, the Bahmani Sultanate, and the Gajapatis of Odisha, making him one of the most powerful Hindu monarchs in Indian history. Major campaigns during his reign included the conquest of the Raichur Doab in 1512, the subjugation of Odisha in 1514, and a decisive victory against the Sultan of Bijapur in 1520. On many occasions, the king changed battle plans abruptly, turning a losing battle into victory.

When the Mughal emperor Babur surveyed the rulers of India, he considered Krishnadevaraya the most powerful, ruling over the most extensive empire in the subcontinent. Portuguese travellers Domingo Paes and Duarte Barbosa, who visited his court, described him as an able administrator and an exceptional military commander who personally led campaigns and tended to wounded soldiers. The poet Mukku Timmana praised him as the "Destroyer of the Turks". Krishnadevaraya was guided by his trusted prime minister Timmarusu, whom he credited as the architect of his rise to the throne, and was also advised by the witty poet Tenali Ramakrishna.

His reign is also regarded as a golden age of Telugu literature, and he was a distinguished patron of arts and scholarship. Krishnadevaraya himself composed the Telugu poetic work Amuktamalyada, celebrated for its literary and devotional value. His court was home to the Ashtadiggajas—eight legendary Telugu poets—including Allasani Peddana and Mukku Timmana. Literary activity flourished not only in Telugu but also in Sanskrit, Kannada, and Tamil under his patronage, making his court a major cultural hub of the era.

Krishnadevaraya was conferred with several honorific titles such as Andhra Bhoja ("Bhoja of Andhra"), Karnatakaratna Simhasanadeeshwara ("Lord of the Jewelled Throne of Karnataka"), Mooru Rayara Ganda ("Lord of Three Kings"), Kannada Rajya Rama Ramana ("Lord of the Kannada Empire"), and Gaubrahmana Pratipalaka ("Protector of Cows and Brahmins").

== Early life ==
Krishnadevaraya was the son of Tuluva Narasa Nayaka and his queen Nagamamba. Tuluva Narasa Nayaka was an army commander under Saluva Narasimha Deva Raya, who later took control to prevent the disintegration of the empire and established the Tuluva dynasty of the Vijayanagara Empire. He ascended the throne after the death of his half-brother Viranarasimha. He was married to Srirangapatna's princess Tirumala Devi and his royal dancer from Kodagu, Chinna Devi. He was father to Tirumalamba (from Tirumala Devi), Vengalamba (from Chinna Devi) and Tirumala Raya (from Tirumala Devi). His daughters were married to Prince Rama Raya of Vijayanagara and his brother Prince Tirumala Deva Raya.

== Military career ==
His main enemies were the Bahmani Sultanate, the Deccan Sultanates, the Gajapatis of Odisha, who had been involved in constant conflict since the rule of Saluva Narasimha Deva Raya, and Portugal, a rising maritime power which controlled much of the sea trade.

=== Success in the Deccan ===
The raid and plunder of Vijayanagara towns and villages by the Deccan sultans came to an end during the Raya's rule. In 1509, Krishnadevaraya's armies clashed with them and Sultan Mahmud was severely injured and defeated. Yusuf Adil Shah was killed and the Raichur Doab was annexed. Taking advantage of the victory, the Raya reunited Bidar, Gulbarga, and Bijapur into Vijayanagara and earned the title "establisher of the Yavana kingdom" when he released Sultan Mahmud and made him de facto ruler. The Sultan of Golconda Sultan Quli Qutb Shah was defeated by Timmarusu, the prime minister of Krishnadevaraya. In 1513, Krishnadevaraya personally engaged in battle with Golconda Sultan Quli Qutb Shah at Pangal. The Vijayanagar army suffered defeat at the hands of the Golconda forces, resulting in the capture of the Pangal fort from Vijayanagar. As a consequence, Raya was compelled to retreat.

=== War with Kalinga ===
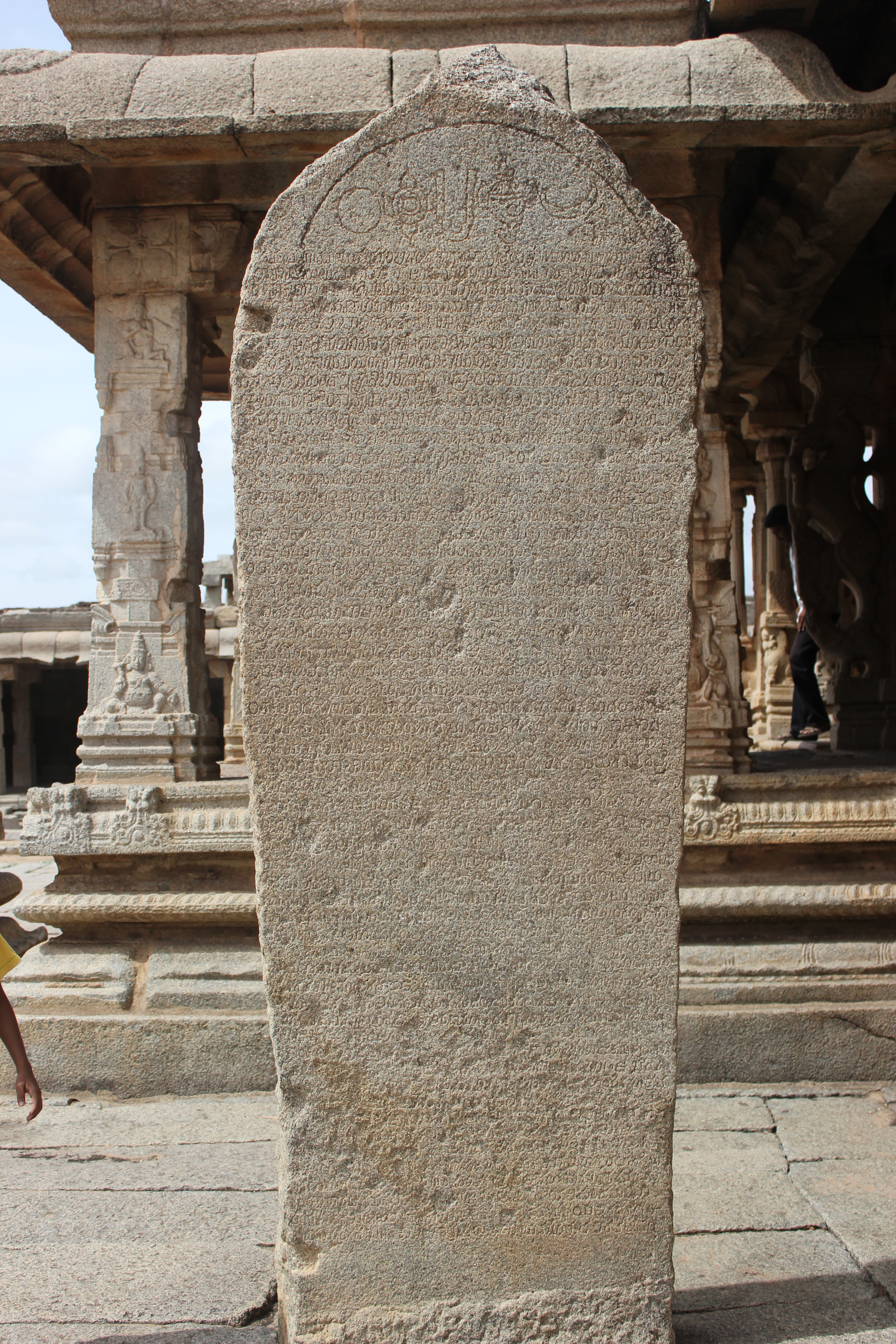
Kannada inscription, dated 1513 CE, of Krishnadevaraya at the Krishna temple in Hampi describes his victories against the Gajapati Kingdom of Odisha.

The Gajapatis of Odisha ruled a vast land comprising parts of Bengal, Andhra, and Odisha. Krishnadevaraya's success at Ummatur provided the necessary impetus to carry his campaign into the coastal Andhra region, which was under the control of the Gajapati king Prataparudra Deva. The Vijayanagara army laid siege to the Udayagiri fort in 1512. The campaign lasted for a year before the Gajapati army disintegrated due to starvation. Krishnadevaraya offered prayers at Tirupati thereafter, along with his wives Tirumala Devi and Chinnama Devi. The Gajapati army was then met at Kondaveedu. The armies of Vijayanagara, after establishing a siege for a few months, began to retreat due to heavy casualties. Timmarusu discovered a secret entrance to the unguarded eastern gate of the fort and launched a night attack. This culminated with the capture of the fort and the imprisonment of Prince Virabhadra, the son of Prataparudra Deva. Vasireddy Mallikharjuna Nayaka took over as governor of Kondaveedu thereafter.

Krishnadevaraya planned an invasion of Kalinga, but Prataparudra learned of this plan and formulated his own plan to defeat the former at the fort of Kalinganagar. Timmarusu discovered Prataparudra's plan by bribing a Telugu deserter from the service of Prataparudra. When the Vijayanagara Empire did invade, Prataprudra was driven to Cuttack, the capital of the Gajapati Kingdom. Prataparudra eventually surrendered to the Vijayanagara Empire, and gave his daughter, Princess Jaganmohini, in marriage to Krishnadevaraya. Krishnadevaraya returned all the lands that the Vijayanagara Empire had captured north of the Krishna River; this made the Krishna river the boundary between the Vijayanagara and Gajapati Kingdoms.

Krishnadevaraya established friendly relations with the Portuguese in Goa in 1510. The Emperor obtained guns and Arabian horses from the Portuguese merchants. He also utilized Portuguese expertise to improve the water supply to the Vijayanagara capital.

=== Final conflicts ===
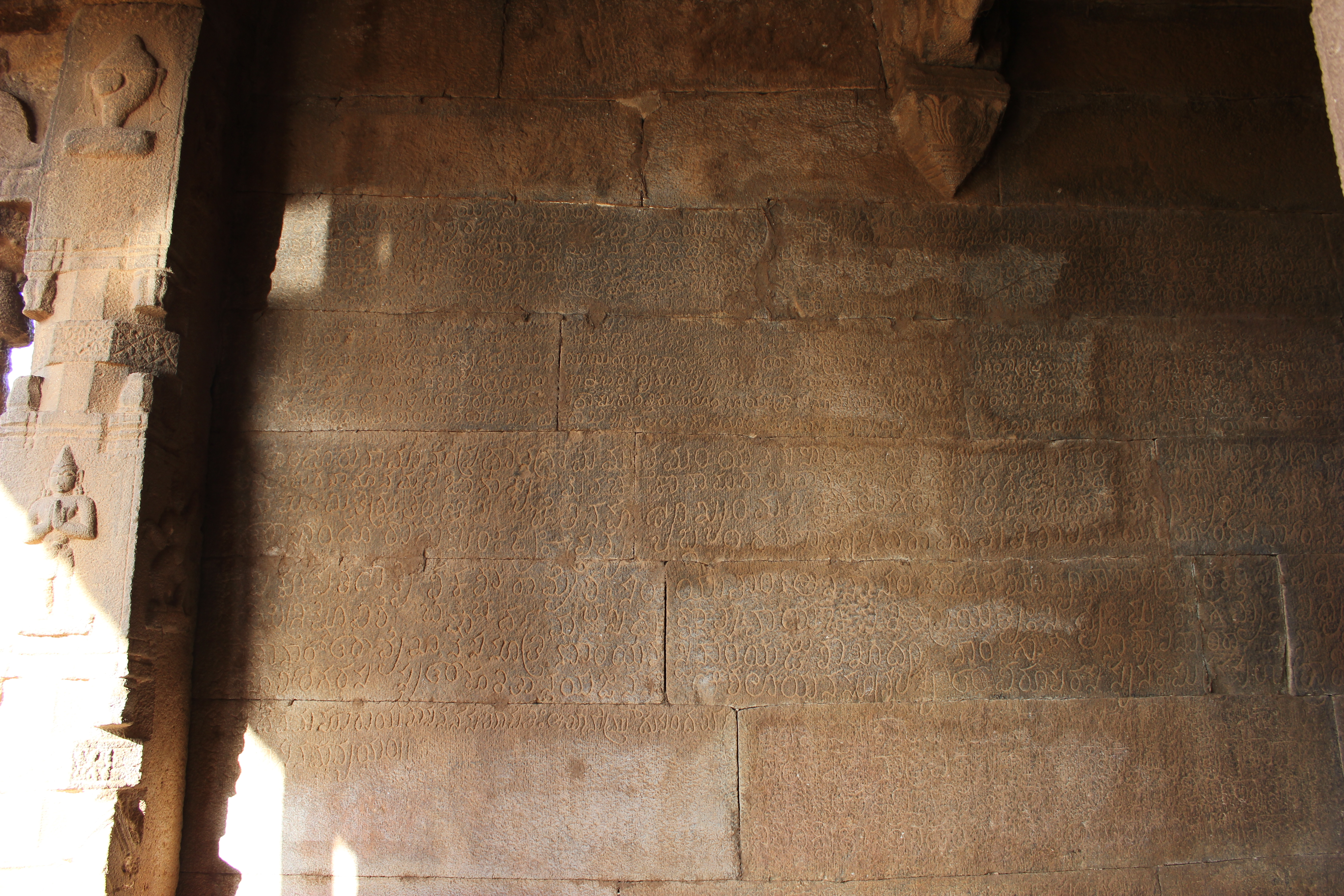
Kannada inscription dated 1524 A.D., of Krishnadevaraya at the Anathasayana temple in Anathasayanagudi near Hampi. The temple was built in memory of his deceased son

The complicated alliances of the empire and the five Deccan sultanates meant that he was continually at war. In one campaign, he defeated Golconda and captured its commander Madurul-Mulk, crushed Bijapur and its sultan Ismail Adil Shah, and restored the Bahmani sultanate to the son of Muhammad Shah II.

The highlight of his conquests occurred on 19 May 1520 where he secured Raichur Fort from Ismail Adil Shah after a difficult siege in which 16,000 Vijayanagara soldiers were killed. The exploits of the military commander, Pemmasani Ramalinga Nayudu of the Pemmasani Nayaks, during the Battle of Raichur were distinguished and lauded by Krishnadevaraya. It is said that 700,000 foot soldiers, 32,600 cavalry, and 550 elephants were used. A Portuguese contingent commanded by Cristovão de Figueiredo with the use of fireweapons helped to conquer the fortress.

Krishnadevaraya was brutal towards Bahmani Generals of Raichur. Many Bahmani generals lost their lands. The other Muslim kings sent envoys to the emperor on hearing of his success and received a haughty reply. The king conveyed that if Adil Shah would come to him, do obeisance, and kiss his foot, his lands would be restored to him. The submission never took place. Krishnadevaraya then led his army as far north as Bijapur and occupied it. He imprisoned three sons of a former king of the Bahmani dynasty, who had been held captive by the Adil Shah and he proclaimed the eldest as king of the Deccan.

Finally, in his last battle, he razed to the ground the fortress of Gulburga, the early capital of the Bahmani sultanate.

== Later life and death ==
In 1524, Krishnadevaraya made his son Tirumala Raya the Yuvaraja (crown prince). The prince did not survive for long, as he was poisoned soon after. Suspecting Timmarusu, Krishnadevaraya had him blinded. At the same time, Krishnadevaraya was preparing for an attack on Belgaum, which was in the Adil Shah's possession. Around this time, Krishnadevaraya fell ill and eventually died on 17 October 1529, succeeded by his brother, Achyuta Deva Raya.

== Internal affairs ==
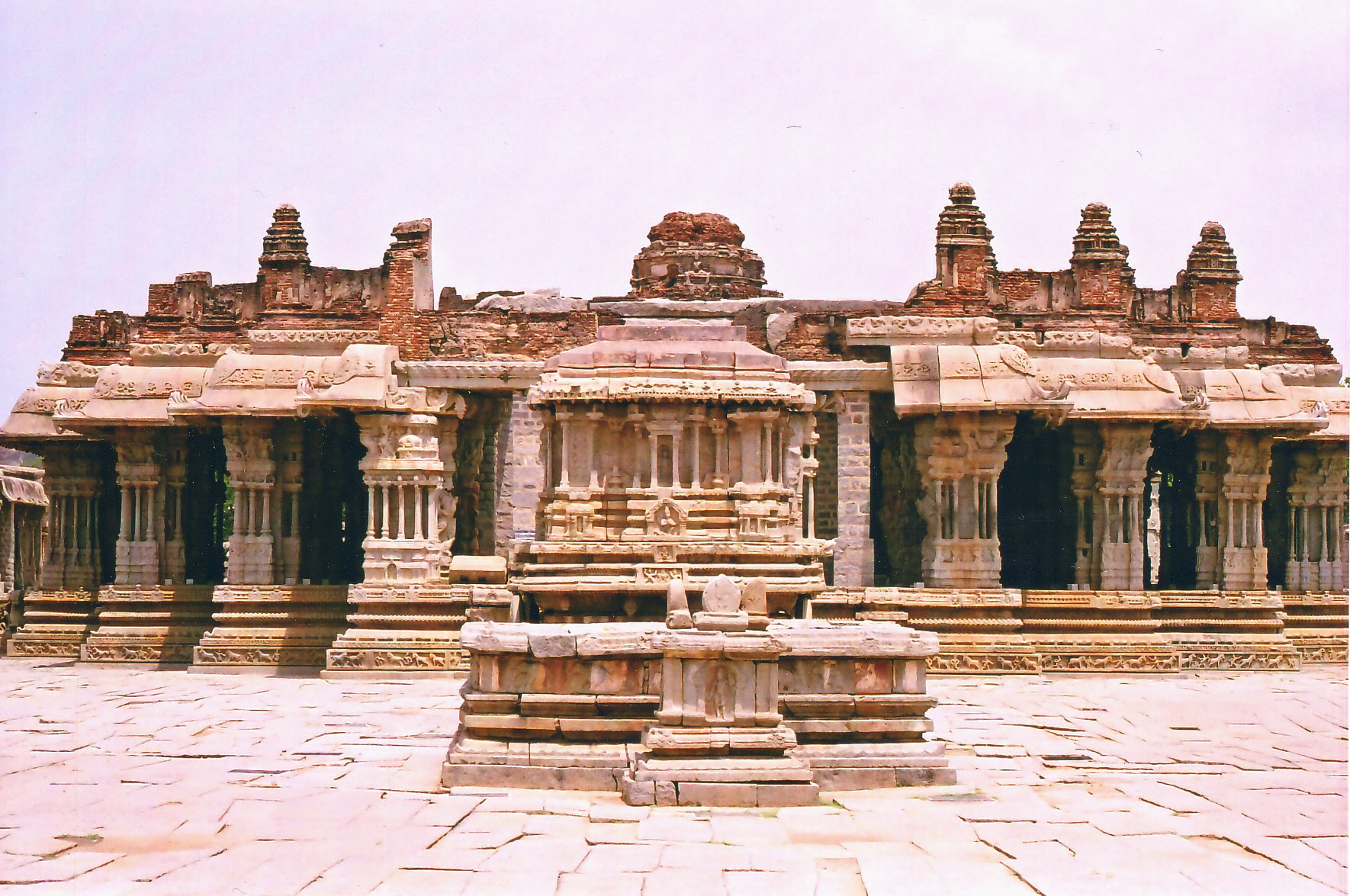
Vitthala temple with musical pillars, Hoysala style multigonal base Hampi

During his reign he kept strict control over his ministers, and dealt severely with any minister who committed misdeeds. He abolished obnoxious taxes such as the marriage fee. To increase revenues, he brought new lands under cultivation, ordering the deforestation of some areas and undertook a large-scale work to obtain water for irrigation around Vijayanagara. Foreign travellers such as Paes, Nunez and Barbosa who visited Vijayanagara spoke highly of the efficiency of his administration and the prosperity of the people during his reign.

The administration of the empire was carried along the lines indicated in his Amuktamalyada. He was of the opinion that a king should always rule with an eye towards Dharma. His concern for the welfare of the people is amply proved by his extensive annual tours all over the empire, during which he studied everything personally and tried to redress the grievances of the people and punish evildoers. With regard to the promotion of the economic progress of his people, Krishnadevaraya says,

The extent of the kingdom is the means for the acquisition of wealth. Therefore even if the land is limited in extent, excavate tanks and canals and increase the prosperity of the poor by leasing him the land for low ari and koru, so that you may obtain wealth as well as religious merit.

== Art and literature ==
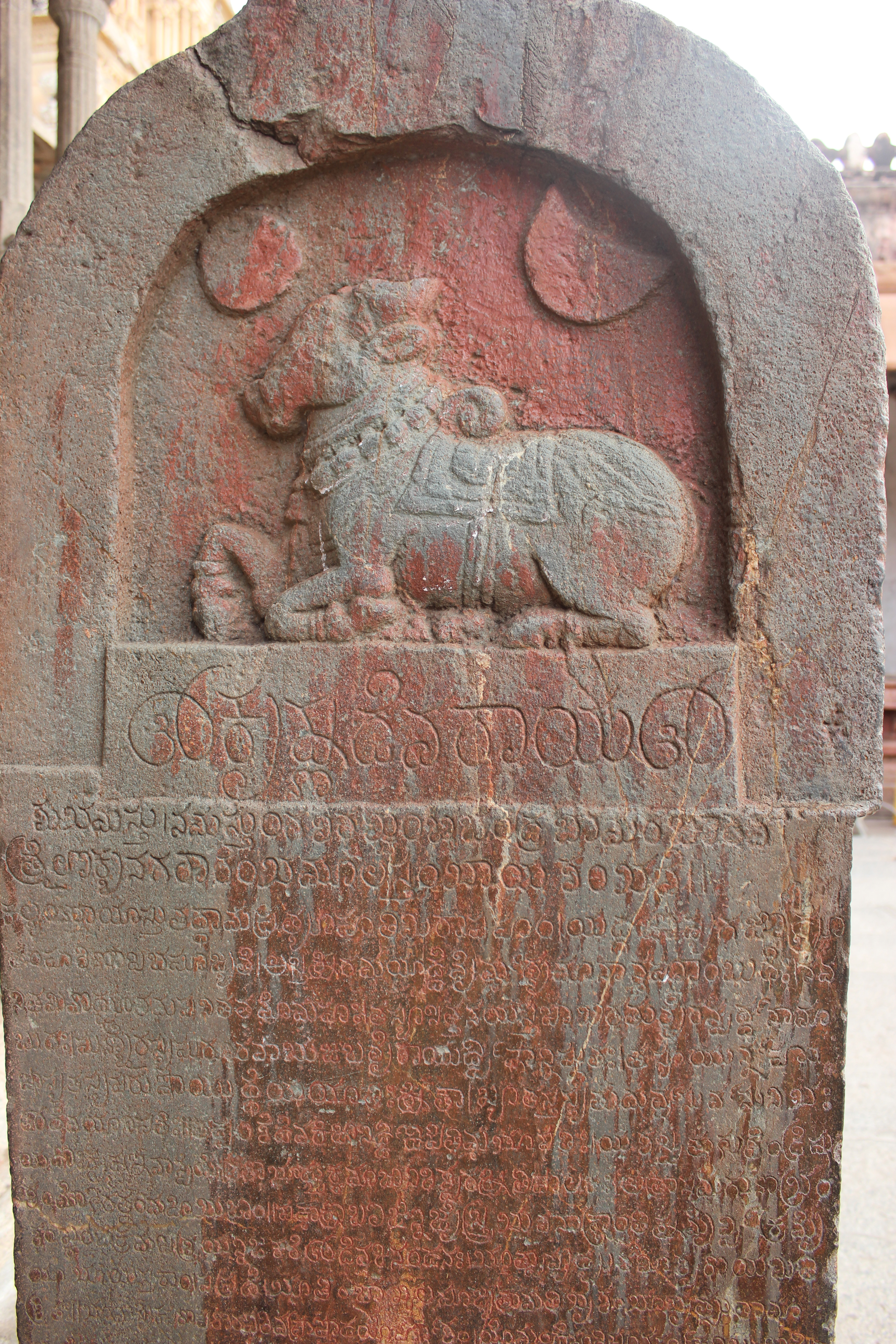
Kannada inscription describing the coronation of Krishnadevaraya at the entrance to Virupaksha temple, Hampi

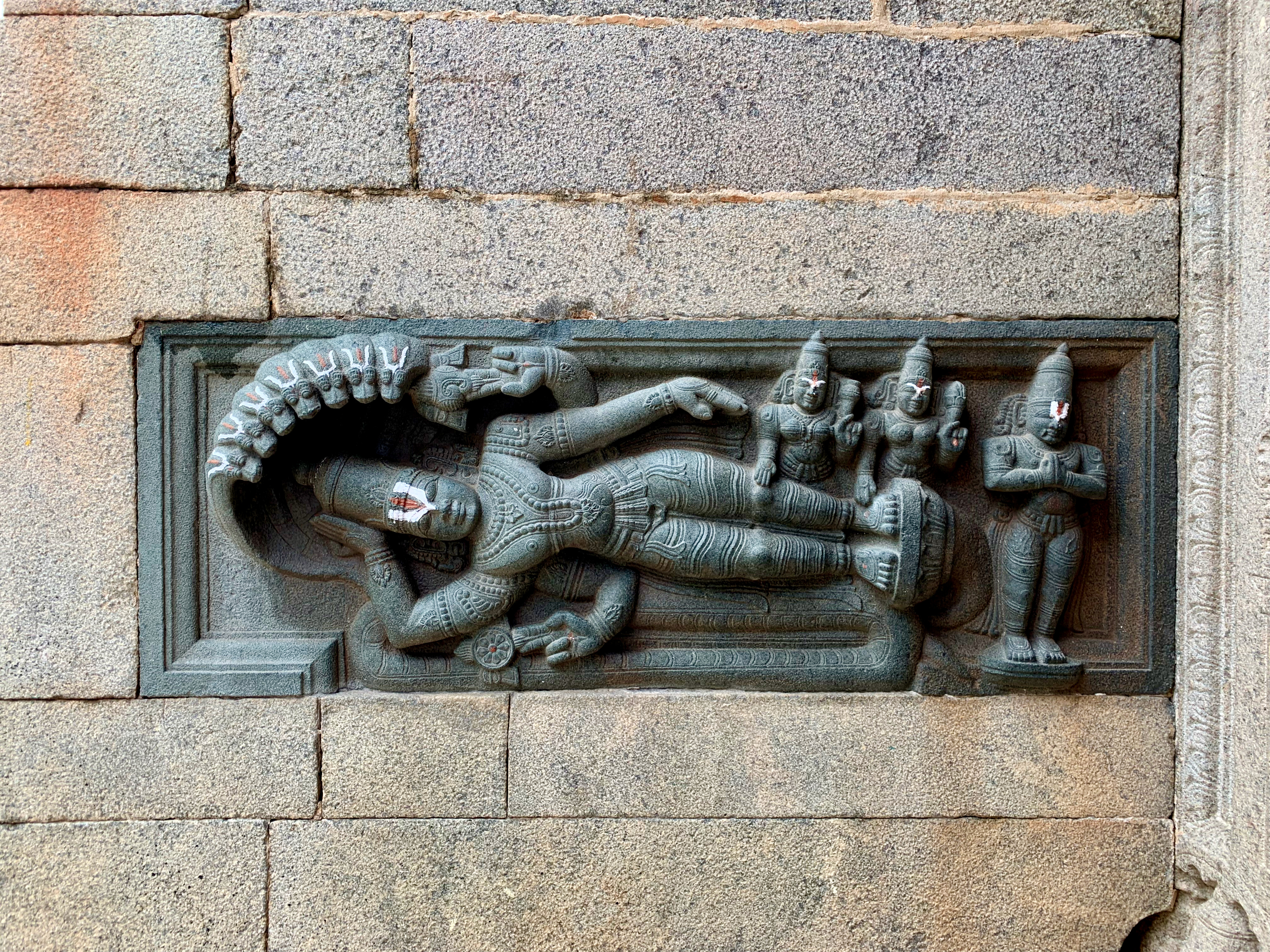
Sculpture of Ranganayaka (Ranganatha) at Ranganathaswamy Temple in Srirangam.

Krishnadevaraya was noted to be linguistically neutral as he ruled a multilingual empire. He is known to have patronised poets and issued inscriptions in languages as varied as Kannada, Sanskrit, Telugu and Tamil. Krishnadevaraya himself was a polyglot, fluent in Kannada, Sanskrit, Telugu and Tamil. The official language of the Vijayanagara court was Kannada.

Krishnadevaraya patronized literature in various languages. The rule of Krishnadevaraya was an age of prolific literature in many languages, although it is particularly known as a golden age of Telugu literature. Many Telugu, Kannada, Sanskrit, and Tamil poets enjoyed the patronage of the emperor, who was fluent in many languages. The king himself composed an epic Telugu poem Amuktamalyada. His Sanskrit works include Madalasa Charita, Satyavadu Parinaya, Rasamanjari, and Jambavati Kalyana.

The Telugu poet Mukku Timmanna praised him as a great general and stated:

"O Krishnaraya, you Man-Lion. You destroyed the Turks from far away with just your great name's power. Oh Lord of the elephant king, just from seeing you the multitude of elephants ran away in horror."

=== Telugu literature ===
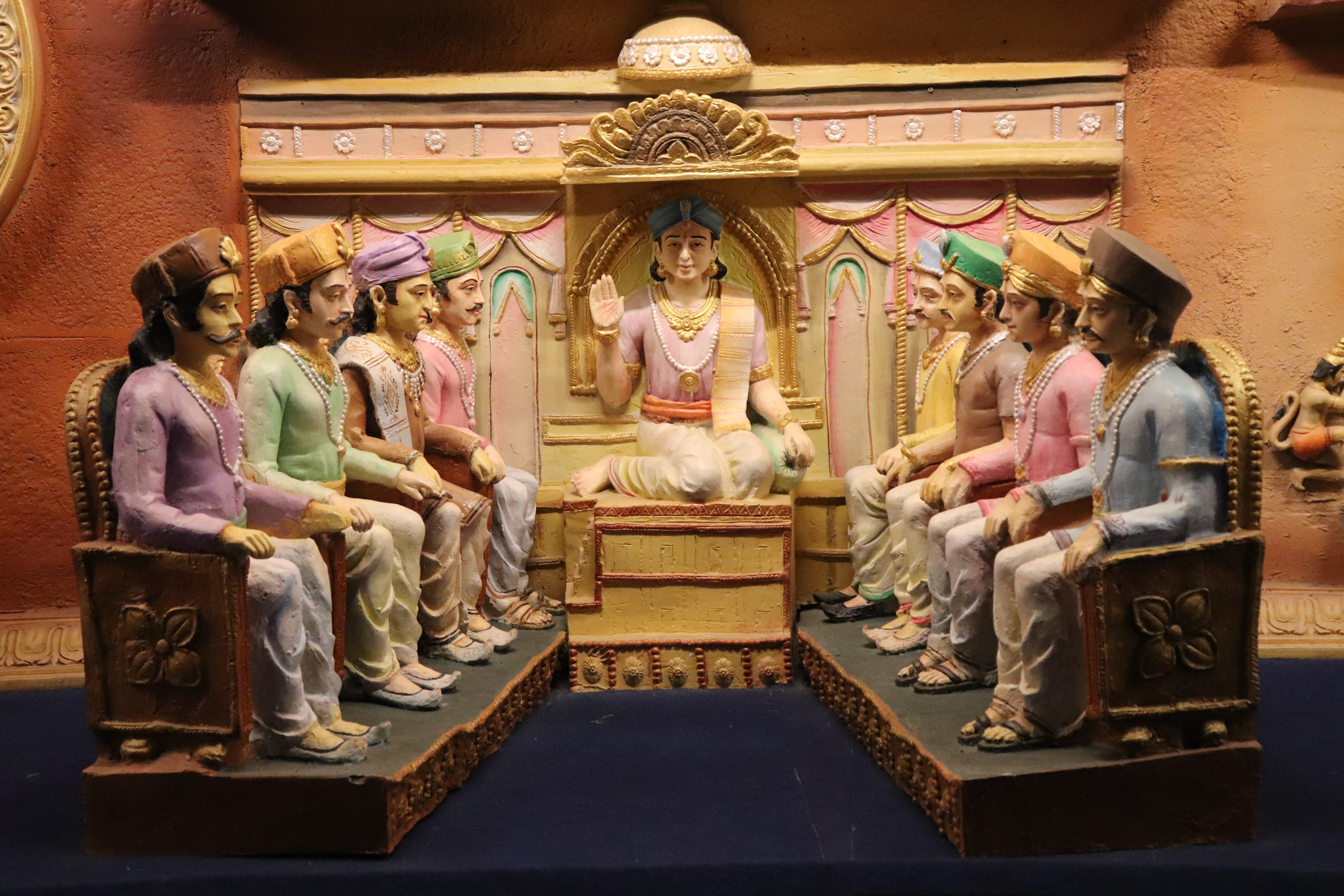
Ashtadiggajas in the court of Krishnadevaraya.

The rule of Krishnadevaraya is known as a golden age of Telugu literature. Eight Telugu poets were regarded as eight pillars of his literary assembly and known as Ashtadiggajas. Krishnadevaraya himself composed an epic Telugu poem Amuktamalyada.

During the reign of Krishnadevaraya, Telugu culture and literature flourished. The great emperor was himself a celebrated poet due to his composition of Amuktamalyada. In the olden days, it was believed that eight elephants were holding the earth in eight different directions. The title "Ashtadiggaja" celebrates this belief and hence the court was also called Bhuvana Vijayam (lit. 'Conquest of the World'). This period of the empire is known as the "Prabandha Period," because of the quality of the prabandha literature it produced.

- Allasani Peddana is considered to be the greatest and given the title of Andhra Kavita Pitamaha (lit. 'the father of Telugu poetry'). Svarocisha Sambhava or Manucharita, his popular prabandha work, was dedicated to Krishnadevaraya
- Nandi Thimmana wrote Parijathapaharanam
- Madayyagari Mallana wrote Rajasekhara Charitramu
- Dhurjati wrote Kalahasti Mahatyamu and Kalahastisvara Satakamu
- Ayyalaraju Ramabhadrudu wrote Sakalakatha Sangraha and Ramaabhyudayamu
- Pingali Surana wrote Raghava Pandaviyamu, Kalapurnodayam and Prabhavate Pradyamana

– Raghavapandaveeyamu is a dual work with double meaning built into the text, describing both the Ramayana and the Mahabharata.
– Kalapurnodayam ("full bloom of art") has been considered the first original poetic novel in Telugu literature

- Battumurthy, alias Ramarajabhushanudu, wrote Kavyalankarasangrahamu, Vasucharitra, Narasabhupaliyam and Harischandranalopakhyanamu, a dual work which tells simultaneously the story of King Harishchandra and Nala and Damayanti
- Tenali Ramakrishna first wrote Udbhataradhya Charitramu, a Shaivite work. However, he later converted to Vaishnavism and wrote the Vaishnava devotional texts Panduranga Mahatmyamu, and Ghatikachala Mahatmyamu. Tenali Rama remains one of the most popular folk figures in India today, a quick-witted courtier ready even to outwit the all-powerful emperor.

Other well-known poets were Sankusala Nrisimha Kavi, who wrote Kavikarna Rasayana, Chintalapudi Ellaya, who wrote Radhamadhavavilasa and Vishnumayavilasa, the poet Molla, who wrote a version of the Ramayana, Kamsali Rudrakavi, who wrote Nirankusopakhyana, and Addamki Gangadhara, who wrote Tapatlsamvarana and Basavapurana. Manumanchi Bhatta wrote a scientific work on veterinary science called Haya lakshanasara.

=== Kannada literature ===
He patronised several Kannada poets. Among them was Mallanarya, who wrote Veera-shaivamruta, Bhava-chinta-ratna and Satyendra Chola-kathe; Chatu Vittalanatha who wrote Bhagavatha; and Timmanna Kavi wrote a eulogy of his king in Krishna Raya Bharata. Vyasatirtha, the noted Dvaita saint from Mysore (of the Madhva tradition) was the emperor's Rajaguru ("royal guru"). The writing Krishna Deva Rayana Dinachari in Kannada is a recently discovered work. The record highlights the contemporary society during Krishnadevaraya's time in his personal diary. However, it is not yet clear if the record was written by the king himself.

Purandara Dasa, widely considered the father of Carnatic music, was closely associated with the empire. He extolled the Madhwa philosophy in his compositions and was a disciple of the Rajaguru of the emperor. According to Sambamoorthy, He was born as Srinivasa, and had his formal initiation by Vyasatirtha took place around 1525 when he was about 40 years of age when he was given the name Purandara Dasa. Purandara Dasa traveled extensively in southern India composing and rendering them in praise of the deity Purandara Vittala. He spent his last years in Hampi where he rendered his compositions in Krishnadevaraya's court.

=== Tamil literature ===
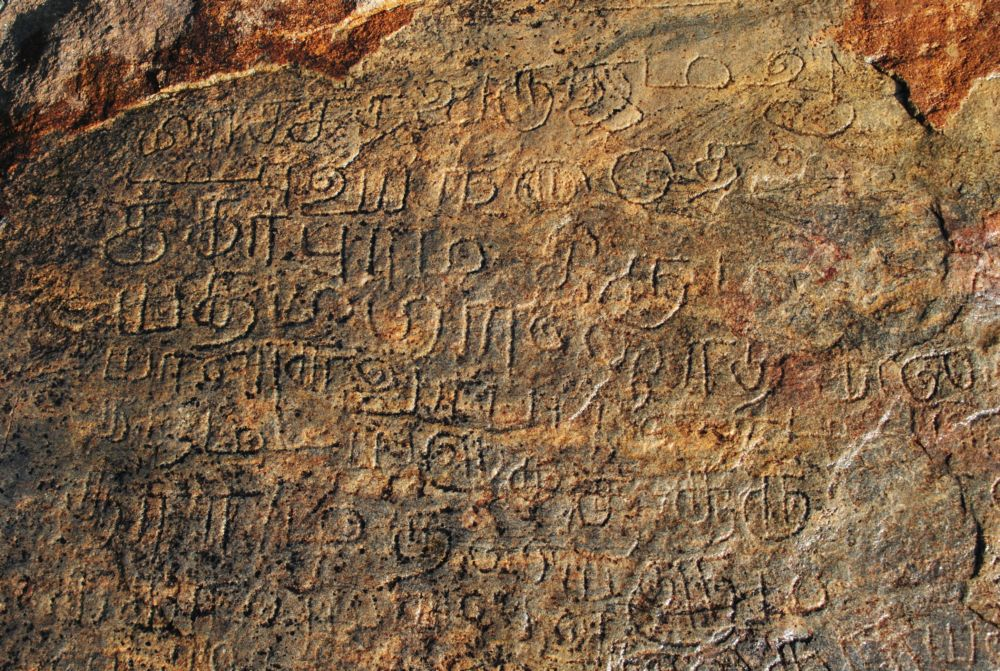
Tamil inscription of Krishnadevaraya, Severappoondi

Krishnadevaraya patronised the Tamil poet Haridasa, and Tamil literature soon began to flourish as the years passed by.

=== Sanskrit literature ===
In Sanskrit, Vyasatirtha wrote Bhedojjivana, Tatparyachandrika, Nyayamrita (a work directed against the Advaita philosophy) and Tarkatandava. Krishnadevaraya, himself an accomplished scholar, wrote Madalasa Charita, Satyavadu Parinaya and Rasamanjari and Jambavati Kalyana.

== Religion and culture ==
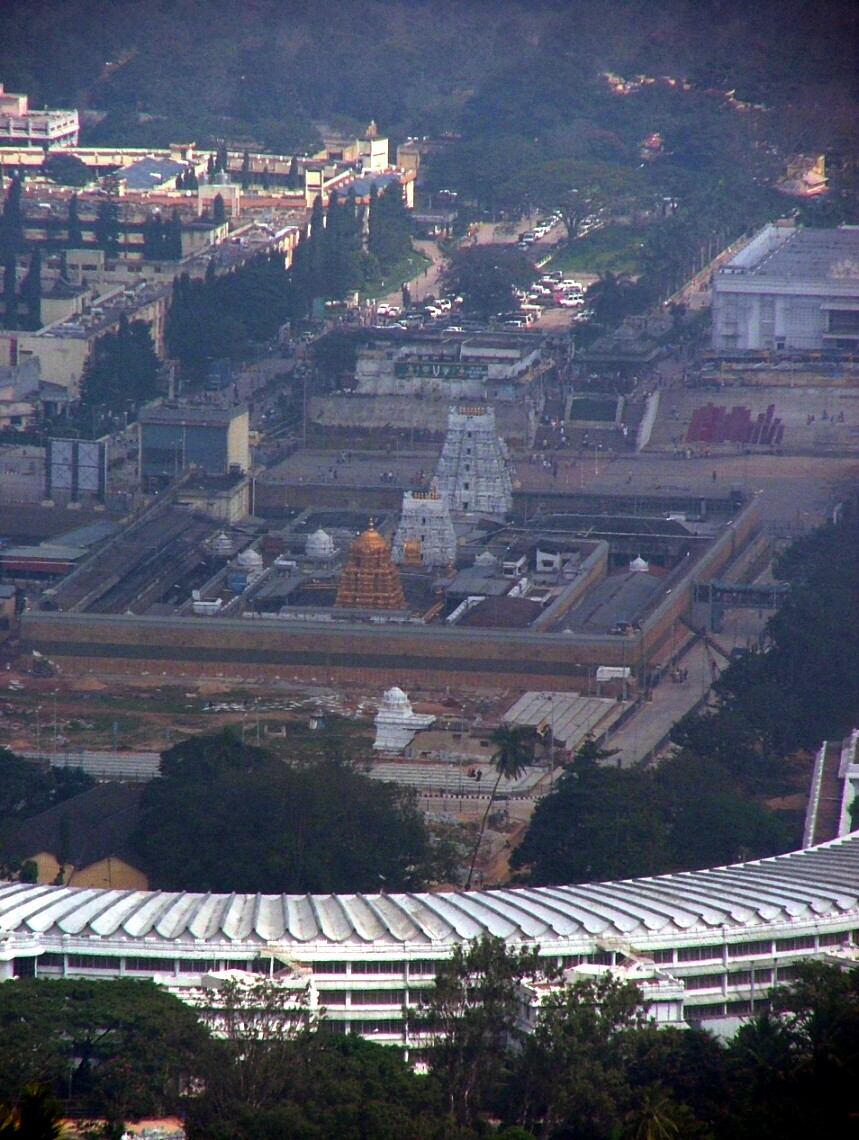
Tirumala Temple and Vaikuntam Queue Complex (semicircular building in the foreground) as seen from Srivari Padalu on Narayanagiri hill

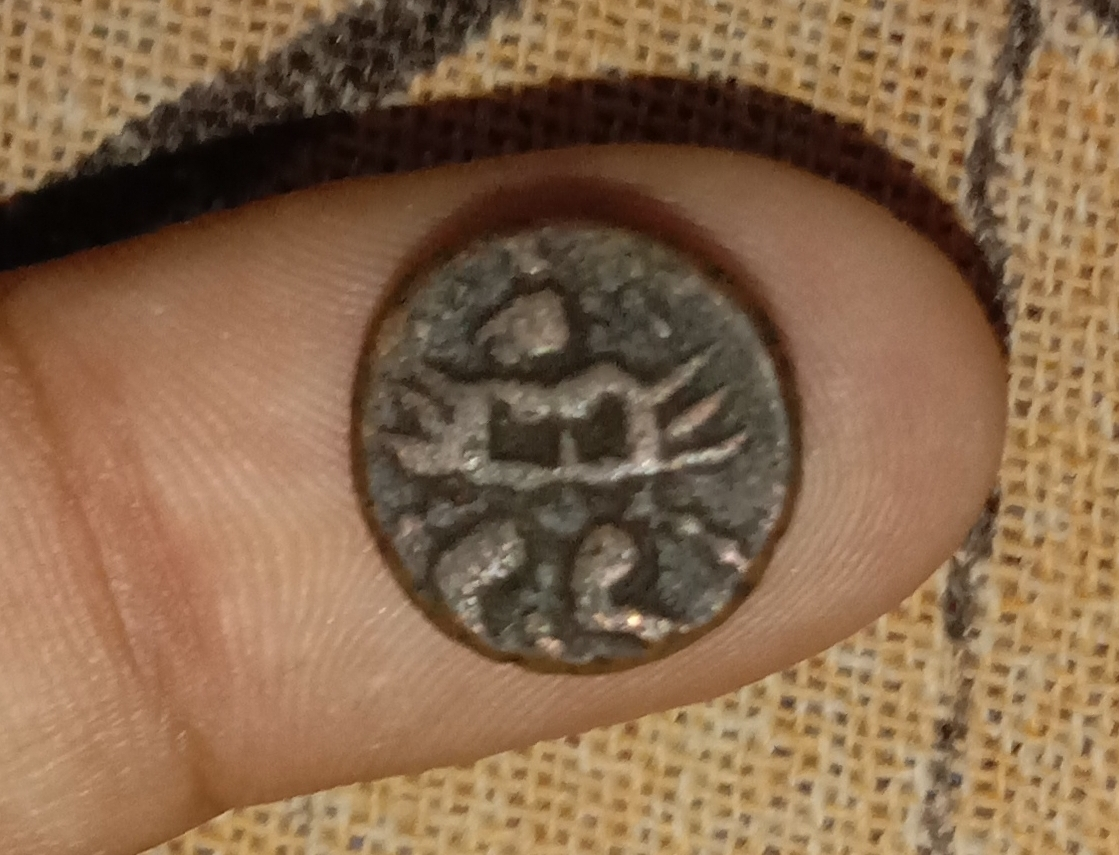
Copper Jital coin of the Vijayanagar Empire, struck during the reign of Krishnadevaraya, having the Garuda motif on obverse.

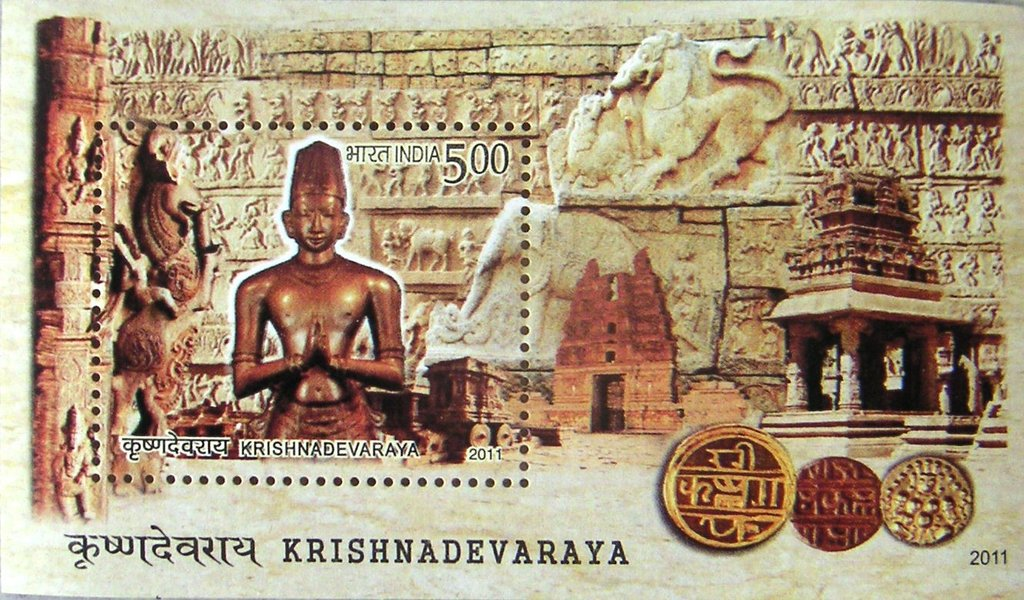
India Post released a commemorative miniature sheet to mark the completion of 500 years of Krishnadevaraya's coronation.

Krishnadevaraya respected all sects of Hinduism. He is known to have encouraged and supported various sects and their places of worship. He rebuilt the Virupaksha Temple and other Shiva shrines. He gave land grants to the temples of Tirumala, Srisailam, Amaravati, Chidambaram, Ahobilam, and Tiruvannamalai. He lavished on the Tirumala Venkateswara Temple numerous objects of priceless value, ranging from diamond studded crowns to golden swords to nine kinds of precious gems. Krishnadevaraya made Venkateshwara his patron deity. He visited the temple seven times. Out of the around 1,250 temple epigraphs published by the Tirumala Devasthanam, 229 are attributed to Krishnadevaraya. A statue of Krishnadevaraya with two of his wives is found at the temple complex of Tirumala. These statues are still visible at the temple at the exit. He also contributed in building parts of the Srisailam temple complex where he had rows of mandapas built.

Sri Vaishnavas claim that Krishnadevaraya himself was formally initiated into the Sri Vaishnava tradition, which is why he wrote the Telugu work Amuktamalyada on Andal, a female Tamil Sri Vaishnava saint. They claim that Venkata Tathacharya of the Sri Vaishnava sect was Krishnadevaraya's rajaguru, and he was considered influential. But the Madhva text Vyasayogicarita, biography of the Madhva seer Vyasatirtha, says that he was the kulaguru of Krishnadevaraya. A manuscript from Madras Oriental Manuscript Library which is from a book written by Krishnadevaya himself in which Krishnadevaraya himself wrote that Vyasatirtha is his Rajaguru.

== In popular culture ==
- The 1970 Kannada film Sri Krishnadevaraya starring Dr. Rajkumar was based on the life of Krishnadevaraya.

Krishnadevaraya's character was also portrayed in other movies:

  - The 1956 Tamil - Telugu bilingual titled Tenali Ramakrishna/Tenali Raman had NTR portraying the role of Krishnadevaraya.
  - The 1962 Telugu movie Mahamantri Timmarusu again had NTR portraying the role of Krishnadevaraya.
  - The 1982 Kannada movie Hasyaratna Ramakrishna had Srinath portraying the role of Krishnadevaraya.

== See also ==
- Tuluva dynasty

== Sources ==
- Eaton, Richard M. (2013), "'Kiss My Foot,' Said the King: Firearms, Diplomacy and the Battle for Raichur, 1520", in Richard M. Eaton; Munis D. Faruqui; David Gilmartin; Sunil Kumar (eds.), Expanding Frontiers in South Asian and World History: Essays in Honour of John F. Richards, Cambridge University Press, pp. 275–298, ISBN 978-1-107-03428-0
- Smith, Vincent, Oxford History of India, 4th ed., pp. 306–307, 312–313.
- Dr. Suryanath U. Kamat (2001), Concise history of Karnataka, MCC, Bangalore (Reprinted 2002)
- Prof K.A. Nilakanta Sastri, History of South India, From Prehistoric times to fall of Vijayanagar, 1955, OUP, New Delhi (Reprinted 2002)

| Preceded by Viranarasimha Raya | Vijayanagara Empire; 1509–1529 | Succeeded by Achyuta Deva Raya |
