= Ramarajabhushanudu =

16th century Telugu poet and musician

Ramarajabhushanudu (born Bhattu Murthi, fl. 16th century CE) was a Telugu poet and a notable musician. He is considered to be one of the Ashtadiggajas. He was a poet in the court of Rama Raya, the son-in-law of emperor Krishna Deva Raya.

== Biography ==
Ramarajabhushanudu is posited to have lived between 1510 and 1580 by scholars. According to the archeological evidence (Sasanas) available in the Kasanuru village, he was a native of Kasanuru village in Simhadripuram Mandal in Kadapa district. He was adopted to the village. He is believed to belong to the Bhatraju caste. He was also believed to be an apprentice of the Allasani Peddana in his youth. His real name was Bhattu Murthi (భట్టుమూర్తి), though because he was the jewel (Bhushanam) of the royal court of Rama Raya, he later became known as Rama Raja Bhushanudu (రామరాజభూషనుడు). He was also a distinguished musician and played the Veena.

== Works ==
His popular works are Kavyalankarasangrahamu, Vasucaritramu, Hariscandra Nalopakhyanamu, and Narasabhupaleeyamu. He dedicated Vasucharita to Tirumala Deva Raya and Harischandra Nalopakhyanamu to Orugnati Narasaraya.

== Style ==
His work Vasucharitra is the most renowned for its use of Slesha, or double meaning. These poems were later imitated by many Telugu poets including Chemakura Venkata Kavi.

Similar to Pingali Surana, he also wrote a dvayarthi (double entendre) work called Harischandra Nalopakhanam. Each poem of story narrates to life of the kings Harischandra and Nala. As he was also a musician, some of his poetic compositions had a musical flow and rhythm.

== Awards and Titles ==
- He is credited as gem of Ramaraya's court, and hence his name is Rama-raja-bhushana.
