= Sāyaṇa =

14th-century Vijayanagaran Vedic commentator

Sayana (IAST: Sāyaṇa; also called Sāyaṇācārya; died 1387) was a 14th-century Sanskrit Mimamsa scholar from the Vijayanagara Empire of peninsular India, near modern day Bellary, Karnataka. An influential commentator on the Vedas, he flourished under King Bukka Raya I and his successor Harihara II. More than a hundred works are attributed to him, among which are commentaries on nearly all parts of the Vedas. He also wrote on a number of subjects like medicine, morality, music and grammar.

== Early life ==
Sāyaṇācārya was born to Mayana (IAST: Māyaṇa) and Shrimati in a Brahmin family who lived in Hampi. He had an elder brother named Madhava (sometimes identified with Vidyaranya) and a younger brother named Bhoganatha (or Somanatha). The family belonged to the Bharadvaja gotra, and followed the Taittiriya Shakha (school) of the Krishna Yajurveda.

He was the pupil of Vishnu Sarvajna and of Shankarananda. Both Mādhavāchārya and Sāyaṇāchārya were said to have studied under Vidyatirtha of Sringeri, and held offices in the Vijayanagara Empire. Sāyaṇāchārya was a minister, and subsequently prime minister in Bukka Raya's court, and wrote much of his commentary with his brother and other Brahmins during his ministership.

== Works ==
Sāyaṇa was a Sanskrit-language writer and commentator, and more than a hundred works are attributed to him, among which are commentaries on nearly all parts of the Vedas. (Note: Complete list of works by written by Sayana: Subhashita-sudhanidhi; Prayasuchitta-sudhanidhi; Ayurveda-sudhanidhi; Alamkara-sudhanidhi; Purushartha-sudhanidhi; Yajnatantra-sudhanidhi; Madaviya-dhatuvritti; Taitriyya-samhita-bhashya; Taittriya-brahmnana-bhashya; Taittriya-aranyaka-bhashya; Aitareya-aranyaka-bhashya; Samaveda-bhashya; Tandya-brahmana-bhashya; Samavidhana-brahmana-bhashya; Arsheya-brahmana-bhashya; Devatadhyaya-brahmana-bhashya; Samhitopanishad-brahmana-bhashya; Vamshya-brahmana-bhashya; Aitareya-brahmana-bhashya; Kanva-samhita-bhashya; Atharvaveda-bhashya) Some of these works were actually written by his pupils, and some were written in conjunction with his brother, Vidyāraṇya or Mādhavacārya.

His major work is his commentary on the Vedas, Vedartha Prakasha, literally "the meaning of the Vedas made manifest", (Note: Sardesai: "Of all the commentaries on the Vedas, the most comprehensive and arguably the highest regarded is the one by Sayana from Karnataka in South India in the fourteenth century C.E.") written at the request of King Bukka of the Vijayanagara empire "to invest the young kingdom with the prestige it needed." He was probably aided by other scholars, (Note: Modak 1995, pp. 34, 40, quoting H. H. Wilson who translated the whole of Rigveda following the commentary of Sayana: "Although the interpretation of Sayana may be occasionally questioned, he undoubtedly had a knowledge of his text far beyond the pretension of any European scholar and must have been in possession, either through his own learning or that of his assistants, of all the interpretations which had been perpetuated by traditional teaching from the earliest times.") using the interpretations of several authors. (Note: Gopal 1983, p. 170: "There is no doubt that Sayana's Rgveda-Bhasya which represents a synthesis of different exegetical traditions of ancient India is not the work of a single author. This is why it is marred by several contradictions which cannot be easily reconciled.") The core portion of the commentary was likely written by Sāyaṇāchārya himself, but it also includes contributions by his brother Mādhavāchārya, and additions by his students and later authors who wrote under Sāyaṇāchārya's name. "Sāyaṇa" (or also Sāyaṇamādhava) by convention refers to the collective authorship of the commentary as a whole without separating such layers.

Galewicz states that Sayana, a Mimamsa scholar, "thinks of the Veda as something to be trained and mastered to be put into practical ritual use", noticing that "it is not the meaning of the mantras that is most essential [...] but rather the perfect mastering of their sound form." According to Galewicz, Sayana saw the purpose (artha) of the Veda as the "artha of carrying out sacrifice", giving precedence to the Yajurveda. For Sayana, whether the mantras had meaning depended on the context of their practical usage. This conception of the Veda, as a repertoire to be mastered and performed, takes precedence over the internal meaning or "autonomous message of the hymns."

His commentary on the Rigveda was translated from Sanskrit to English by Max Müller (1823–1900). A new edition, prepared by the Vaidik Samshodhan Mandala (Vedic Research Institute) Pune, under the general editor V. K. Rajwade, was published in 1933 in four volumes.

He has also written many lesser manuals called Sudhanidhis dealing with Prayaschitta (expiation), Yajnatantra (ritual), Purushartha (aims of human endeavour), Subhashita (Collection of moral sayings), Ayurveda (Indian traditional medicine), Sangita Sara (The essence of music), Prayaschitra, Alankara, and Dhatuvrddhi (grammar).

== Influence ==
According to Dalal, "his work influenced all later scholars, including many European commentators and translators." Sayana's commentary preserved traditional Indian understandings and explanations of the Rigveda, though it also contains mistakes and contradictions. (Note: Jackson 2017, p. 51: "The meanings of the Rigveda barely survived the loss of Hindu autonomy. If Sayana, Vidyaranya's brother, had not written a voluminous commentary explaining or paraphrasing every word of the Rig Veda, many traditional meanings would be unknown today. This alone was a remarkable revival of Hindu knowledge, even if only on the textual level. As Sayana's commentary constantly referred to ancient authorities, it was thought to have preserved the true meanings of Rig Veda in a traditional interpretation going back to the most ancient times [...] Sayana has been of the greatest service in facilitating and accelerating the comprehension of the Vedas even though, with much labour and time-consuming searching, much could have been retrieved from various other sources in India and pieced together by others if Sayana had not done it. His work was an accumulated data bank on the Rig Veda referred to by all modern Vedic scholars." Jackson refers to Macdonell 1968, p. 62, who is quite critical of Sayana, noting that many of Sayana's explanations could not have been based on "either tradition or etymology." According to Macdonell 1968, p. 62, "a close examination of his explanations, as well as those of Yaska, has shown that there is in the Rigveda a large number of the most difficult words, about the proper sense of which neither scholar had any certain information from either tradition or etymology." Macdonell 1968, p. 62 further states that "no translation of the Rigveda based exclusively on Sayana's commentary can possibly be satisfactory." It is Macdonell who states that most of the useful information provided by Yasana could also have been found out by the western philologists.) While some 19th century Indologists were quite dismissive of Sayana's commentary, others were more appreciative. His commentary was used as a reference-guide by Ralph T. H. Griffith (1826–1906), John Muir (1810–1882), H. H. Wilson (1786–1860) and other 19th century European Indologists. According to Wilson, Sayana's interpretation was sometimes questionable, but had "a knowledge of his text far beyond the pretension of any European scholar", reflecting the possession "of all the interpretations which had been perpetuated by traditional teaching from the earliest times." Macdonell (1854–1930) was critical of Sayana's commentary, noting that many difficult words were not properly understood by Sayana. While Rudolf Roth (1821–1895) aimed at reading the Vedas as "lyrics" without the "theological" background of the interpretations of Yaska and Sayana, Max Müller (1823–1900) published a translation of the Rigvedic Samhitas together with Sayana's commentary. His contemporaries Pischel and Geldner were outspoken about the value of Sayana's commentary:

German scholars Pischel and Geldner have expressed in unequivocal terms their opinion that in the matter of Vedic exegesis greater reliance ought to be placed on the orthodox Indian tradition represented by Yaska and Sayana than on modern philological methods. Linguistics may help one to understand the bare meaning of a Vedic word, but the spirit behind that word will not be adequately realised without due appreciation of the indigenous tradition.

Modern scholarship is ambivalent. According to Jan Gonda, the translations of the Rigveda published by Griffith and Wilson were "defective", suffering from their reliance on Sayana. (Note: Klaus Klostermaier cites Jan Gonda (1975), Vedic Literature.) Ram Gopal notes that Sayana's commentary contains irreconcilable contradictions and "half-baked" tentative interpretations which are not further investigated, but also states that Sayana's commentary is the "most exhaustive and comprehensive" of all available commentaries, embodying "the gist of a substantial portion of the Vedic interpretations of his predecessors."

== See also ==
- Advaita Vedanta
- Sringeri Sharada Peetham
- Vijayanagara literature
- Vidyaranya

== Sources ==
- Collins, Randall (2009), The Sociology of Philosophies, Harvard University Press
- Dalal, Rosen (2014), The Vedas: An Introduction to Hinduism's Sacred Texts, Penguin UK
- Galewicz, Cezary (2004), "Changing Canons: What did Sayana think he commented upon", in Balcerowicz, Piotr; Mejor, Marek (eds.), Essays in Indian Philosophy, Religion and Literature, Motilal Banarsidass Publishers
- Galewicz, Cezary (2011), "Why Should the Flower of Dharma be Invisible? Sayana's Vision of the Unity of the Veda", in Squarcini, Federico (ed.), Boundaries, Dynamics and Construction of Traditions in South Asia, Anthem Press
- Gopal, Ram (1983), The History and Principles of Vedic Interpretation, Concept Publishing Company
- Jackson, W.J. (2017). Vijayanagara Voices : Exploring south indian history and hindu literature. Routeledge. ISBN 978-0754639503.
- Klostermaier, Klaus (2007), A Survey of Hinduism (third ed.), State University of New York Press, ISBN 978-0-7914-7082-4
- Lal Khera, Krishan (2002). Directory of Personal Names in the Indian History from the Earliest to 1947. Munshiram Manoharlal. ISBN 978-81-215-1059-2.
- Macdonell, Arthur A. (1968) [1900], A History of Sanskrit Literature, Haskell House Publishers
- Modak, B. R. (1995). Sayana. Sahitya Akademi. ISBN 978-81-7201-940-2.
- Muller, Max F (1869). Rig Veda Sanhita: the sacred hymns of the Brahmans. London: Trubner & Co.
- Sardesai, Damodar Ramaji (2019). India: the definitive history. Routledge.
