= Parijatapaharanamu =

Parijatapaharanamu (parijata+apaharanamu) (lit. the purloining of the Parijata tree) is a Telugu poem composed by Nandi Thimmana. It is based on a story from Harivamsam. The story is about love quarrel between Krishna and his consorts Rukmini and Satyabhama.

== Plot ==
Narada brings a parijatam, a flower that has everlasting fragrance, from Indra's tree to Krishna. Krishna is at Rukmini's house at the time, so he gives the flower to her. Satyabhama learns that he gave the flower to Rukmini, and becomes jealous. Krishna fights the devatas for the tree, and brings the tree back to Satyabhama.

== Publications ==
- Parijatapaharamu was published by Andhra Patrika press in 1929. It also included a detailed commentary named Parimalollasamu by Nagapudi Kuppuswamy.
- In 1933 Vavilla Ramaswamy Sastrulu and Sons along with Surabhi commentary. It was again reprinted in 1960. Dusi Ramamurthi Sastry wrote a detained preface to both editions.
- Andhra Pradesh Sahitya Akademi 1978 printed it for the first time.
- In 2022, a translation by Harshita Mruthinti Kamath and Velcheru Narayana Rao was published in the Murty Classical Library of India series.

== See also ==
- Nandi Thimmana
