= Nandi Thimmana =

Indian poet and Ashtadiggaja in the imperial court

Ashtadiggaja Nandi Thimmana నంది తిమ్మన ನಂದಿ ತಿಮ್ಮನ
- Born: Anantapur, Vijayanagara Empire. (modern day Andhra Pradesh, India).
- Occupation: Poet
- Parent: Singanna (father) Thimmamaamba (mother)
- Writing career
- Pen name: Mukku Thimmana
- Language: Telugu
- Period: Prabandha Period
- Notable works: Pārijātâpaharanamu; Bhārata Kathamanjari; Vanivilasam

Nandi Thimmana (c.15th and 16th centuries CE) was a Telugu Ashtadiggaja and Kannada poet in the imperial court of Emperor Krishnadevaraya of Vijayanagara. He is often called Mukku Thimmana (lit. 'Thimmana of the nose') after his celebrated poem on a woman's nose.

== Biography ==
Thimmana is believed to be from Anantapur and was born to Singanna and Thimmamaamba. He lived in a subkingdom of the Vijayanagara Empire, whose princess was Tirumala Devi. Later tradition imagines Nandi Timmana as one of the so-called asta-dig-gajas, the eight elephants of the cardinal directions, who supposedly graced the court of Krsnadevarāya at the apogee of the Vijayanagara period. Although this set of eight is probably a later (seventeenth-century) invention, Timmana's presence at Krsnadevarāya's court is historically verified. The poet dedicated his work, Pārijātâpaharanamu, to this king. The tradition asserts that the poet arrived in the court as a gift from the family of Tirumaladevi, Krsnadevarāya's senior wife.

He was a Saiva and was a disciple of Guru Aghora Siva, yet some of his works are based on Vaishanavism because of imperial patronage. His uncles Nandi Mallaya and Ganta Singana (known as Malaya Maruta) were a famous poetic pair in the court of Viranarasimha Raya, half-brother of Krishnadevaraya.

He was more popular as Mukku Thimmana because of his poem on a beautiful nose. Mukku means nose in Telugu.

Timmana completed Kannada poet Kumaravyasa's incomplete work Mahabharatha, and presented that as “Karnataka Krishnadevaraya Bharatha Kathamanjari” to the king.

== Style ==
Unlike his contemporaries like Allasani Peddana, he did not use long and complex words and used only soft and simple Telugu words. His works are also understandable to non-scholars and his poetry is fondly called as Mukku Timmana Muddu Paluku (sweet words of Mukku Thimmana) in Telugu. Parijatapaharanam is famous for many soft romantic poems still popular in Telugu.

He did many poetic experiments in his works. One such experiment is called Chitra Kavita (means magical poems). All four lines of a few poems can be read from either direction and all lines are palindromes ignoring spaces. He composed a poem that can be read from end or start, where all four lines together form a palindrome. He also composed a poem with only two letters ('na' and 'ma'). He also presented Garbha Kavita (means hidden poems) in a few poems, where an entire poem will have two different meanings.

== Poetry ==
Poem attributed to Thimmana - "Of a beautiful nose like flower"

నానాసూనవితాన వాసనల నానందించు సారంగ మే
లా న న్నొల్లదటంచు, గంధఫలి బల్కాకం తపంబంది యో
షానాసాకృతి బూని సర్వసుమనస్సౌరభ్యసంవాస మై
పూనెం బ్రేక్షణమాలికామధుకరీ పుంజంబునిర్వంకలన్

== Notable works ==
- Parijatapaharanamu
- Bharata Kathamanjari
- Vanivilasam
