= Madayyagari Mallana =

15th century Indian poet

Mallana (15th century) was a Telugu poet and one of the Astadiggajas (literally means eight elephants) in the court of the king Krishnadevaraya.

== Biography ==
He said that his birthplace was part of Rayalaseema (means land ruled by Rayas, Vijayanagara kings) in his works. He accompanied Krishnadevaraya in his military travels. He dedicated his work to Nadendla Appana (popularly known as Appaji), the governor of Kondavidu and nephew of a Minister called Saluava Timmana in the Vijayanagara Empire.

== Works ==
His popular work is Rajasekara Charitram on the military and romantic conquests of Rajasekara, a king of Avanti.

== Style ==
Like other poets of Prabhanda (fiction) period, his story seems completely original and there is no Sanskrit equivalent to it. Compared to his contemporaries, he is restrained in presenting romance.
