= Ashtadiggajas =

Group of Indian poets, 1509–1529

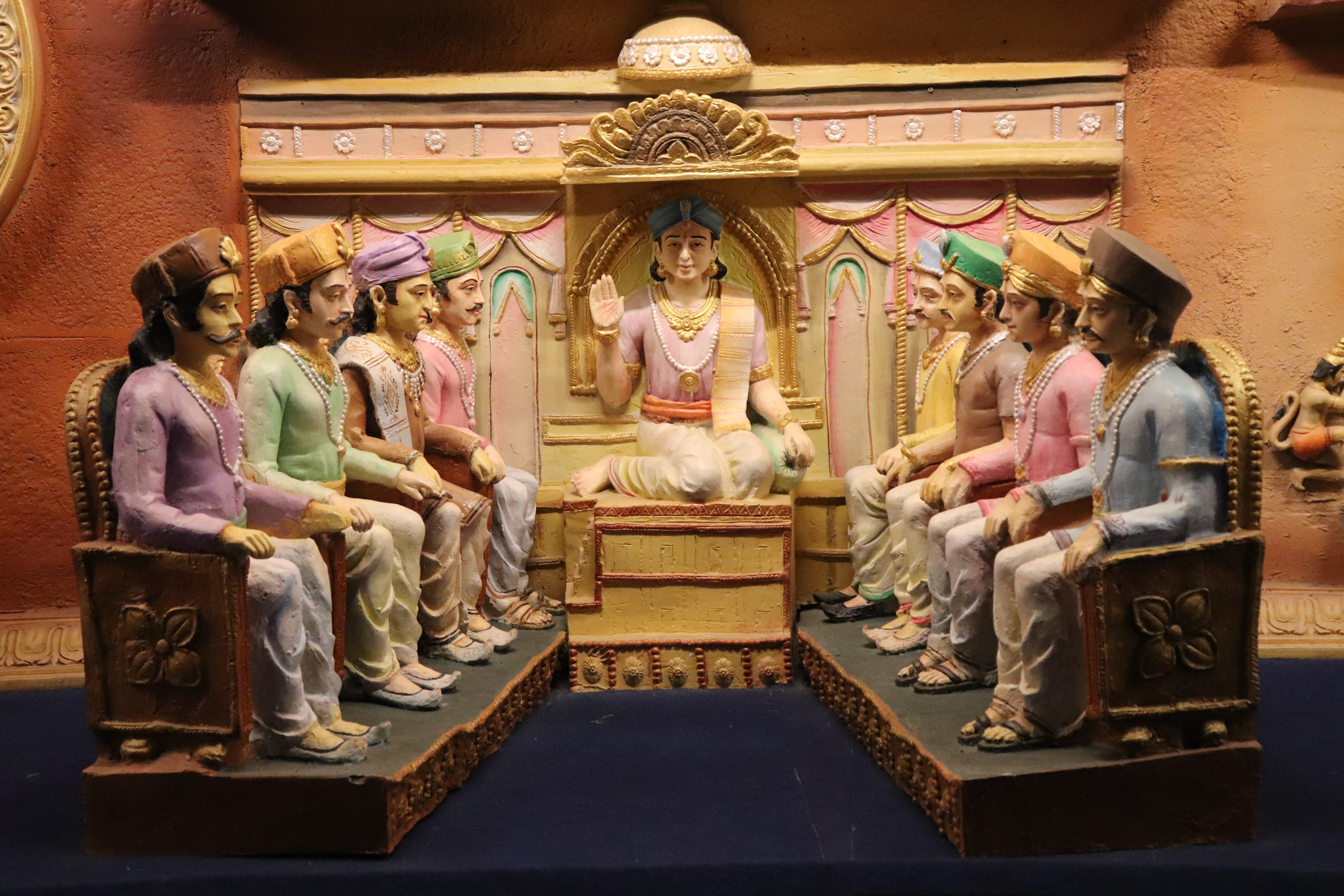
Asthadiggajas in the Imperial court of Sri Krishnadevaraya.

Ashtadiggajas (Telugu: అష్టదిగ్గజులు) is the collective title given to the eight great Telugu scholars and poets in the court of Emperor Krishnadevaraya, who ruled the Vijayanagara Empire from 1509 until his death in 1529. During his reign, Telugu literature and culture reached its zenith. In his imperial court, these eight poets were regarded as the eight pillars of his literary assembly. The age of Ashtadiggajas is called the Prabandha Age (1540 CE to 1600 CE). Each Ashtadiggaja had composed at least one Prabandha Kavyamu, and it was the Ashtadiggajas who gave Prabandha its present form. Most Ashtadiggajas were from Rayalaseema. The Ashtadiggajas Allasani Peddana, Dhurjati, Nandi Thimmana, Madayyagari Mallana and Ayyalaraju Ramabhadrudu were from Rayalaseema. Pandit Ramakrishna hailed from Tenali in the Guntur district of Andhra Pradesh. Ramarajabhushanudu and Pingali Surana were the other two Ashtadiggajas.

== Etymology ==
The title Ashtadiggajas (Ashta + dik + gaja) means elephants in eight directions. It refers to the old Hindu belief that eight elephants hold the earth in eight directions which are namely Airaavata, Pundareeka, Vamana, Kumuda, Anjana, Pushpadanta, Sarvabhauma, Suprateeka, whose wives are Abhra, Kapila, Pingala, Anupama, Taamraparni, Subhradanti, Angana, Anjanaavati. The court of poets were also called Bhuvana Vijayam (Conquest of the World).

== Members ==
These poets were:

- Allasani Peddana
- Nandi Thimmana
- Madayyagari Mallana
- Dhurjati
- Ayyalaraju Ramambhadrudu
- Pingali Surana
- Ramarajabhushanudu
- Tenali Ramakrishna

== More Details ==
Though the above listed eight poets are widely regarded as the Ashtadiggajas, there are some differences of opinion as to who exactly constituted the Ashtadiggajas and if the composition of this body changed over time. Some literary works mention the name of Bhattu-Murti in place of Ramarajabhushanudu and some accounts mention Pingali Surana and Tenali Ramakrishna also as members of the later emperors. From the stone inscriptions of that time, it has been inferred that the village of Thippalur in the present-day Cuddapah district was given to the Ashtadiggajas by the emperor.

Tenali Ramakrishna (also known as Pandit Ramakrishna and Tenali Rama) was a poet, scholar, thinker and a Special Advisor in the court of Krishnadevaraya. He was a Telugu poet who hailed from what is now the Andhra Pradesh region, generally known for his wit and humour. He was one of the Ashtadiggajas or the eight poets at the court of Krishnadevaraya, the Vijayanagara emperor. When he was a child, his father was led to death. So, to overcome the depression that Rama faced, his mother Lakshamma took him to Vijayanagara where he was an advisor and was also a great scholar of Telugu and Sanskrit. He was an advisor in court of Krishnadevaraya.

== Works ==
Allasani Peddana wrote Swaarochisha Manu Sambhavam, dedicated to the Emperor Krishna Deva Raya. Nandi Thimmana wrote Parijataapaharanam and dedicated it to the emperor as well. Madayyagari Mallana wrote Rajasekhara Charitramu. Dhurjati wrote Kalahasti Mahatyamu. Ayyalaraju Ramabhadrudu wrote Ramaabhyudayamu. Pingali Surana wrote Raghavapandaveeyamu, a dual work that describes both Ramayana and Mahabharata. Ramarajabhushanudu wrote Kavyalankarasangrahamu, Vasucharitramu and Harischandranalopakhyanamu. Tenali Ramakrishna wrote Udbhataradhya Charitramu, Panduranga Mahatmyamu, and Ghatikachala Mahatmyamu.

== Literary style ==
Telugu literature reached its peak during their period. A new style called prabandha with added fiction and few omissions from the original stories followed during this period. Poets in earlier century like Tikkana and Potana translated the Sanskrit books and epics without changing the stories from the original. Ashtadiggajas usually took small, sometimes obscure, stories from Puranas and used them as plots for writing major Kāvyas. A Prabandham can be of three types, viz., Prakhyatam, Utpadyam, Misramam (famous story, purely fictional story, mixed story). Ashtadiggajas have written in all the three genres during the Prabandha Yugam.

There are also at least two dual meaning works during this time. Raghavapandaveeyam by Pingali Surana simultaneously runs the stories of Rama and Pandavas. Harischandranalopakhyanamu by Bhattumurthy also simultaneously tells the stories of the emperors Harischandra and Nala.

== See also ==
- Navaratnas, the label given to the court of the emperors Vikramaditya and Akbar.
