= Ayyalaraju Ramabhadrudu =

16th century Indian Telugu-language poet

Ayyalaraju Ramabhadrudu :(Telugu: అయ్యలరాజు రామభద్రుడు), shortly Ramabhadra (16th century, CE) was a famous Telugu poet and was one among the Astadiggajas, which was the title of the group of eight poets in the court of King Krishnadevaraya, a ruler of the Vijayanagara Empire.

== Biography ==
According to Kavali Venkata Ramaswamy, he was a native of the Ceded districts. His birthplace is widely considered as Cuddapah in Andhra Pradesh. He was patronised by Krishnadevaraya originally and later moved to the court of Gobburi Narasaraya, nephew of Aliya Rama Raya, after the death of Krishnadevaraya. He was also known as Pillala Ramabhadrudu.

== Works ==
His famous work was Ramabhyudayamu and he dedicated the work to Narasaraya. At the request of Krishnadevaraya, he translated a work of the king into Telugu as Sakala Katha Sara Sangraham.
