= Pingali Suranna =

16th century Indian poet

Pingali Suranna (Telugu: పింగళి సూరన్న) (16th century CE) was a Telugu poet and was one of the Astadiggajas.

== Early life ==
Suranna's exact birthplace is uncertain. He lived in Kanala village near Nandyala.

Suranna's parents were Abbamamba (mother) and Amarana (father), scholars themselves. Surana dedicated a work to Nandyala Krishna Raju, a subject of the Vijayanagara Empire in Krishna District. It is now established that he was from Kanala village, near Nandyala, on Nandyala and Koilakuntla Road of Nandyal District. There is his samadhi. Potter community celebrates his Jayanthi every year. There is an old Oriental High School in Kanala, which is said to be the part of the legacy of Pingali Surana. Surana Saraswatha Sangham, Nandyal is a literary organisation has existed for more than 25 years. Dr. G. Sahadevudu, a practicing doctor, Gottimukkala Subrahmanya Sastri, a retired teacher and Koduri Seshapani Sarma, a retired teacher are the President, the Secretary and the Joint Secretary of the organization respectively.

== Literary works ==
Surana wrote Garuda Puranam, Prabhavatee Pradyumnamu, Raghava Pandaveeyam, and Kalapurnodayamu in 1500 CE. He dedicated Garuda Puranam to his father and Kalapurnodayam to the king of Nandyal.

Prabhavati Pradyumnamu and Kalapurnodayamu have been translated into English by Velcheru Narayana Rao and David Shulman. The Sound of the Kiss, or The Story that Must Never be Told, translation of Kalapurnodayamu, was published by Columbia University Press in 2002. The Demon's Daughter: A Love Story from South India, translation of Prabhavati Pradyumnamu, was published by SUNY Press in 2006.

=== Style ===
Two of his works were revolutionary in Telugu and the first of their kind. Kalapurnodayam is more of a novel than poetry and Raghava Pandaveeyam is in dvayarthi (double meaning) style.

Kalapurnodayamu means full bloom of art. Surana used advanced literary techniques in Indian literature such as flashbacks and character transformation. Each poem of Raghava Pandaveeyam references to the stories of Ramayanam or Mahabharatam simultaneously. The entire work is double entendre. His first work Garuda Puranam is in Prabandha style, popular for romantic poems.

== Awards and Titles ==
- The critic Cattamanchi Ramalinga Reddy praised Kalapurnodayam as the best original book ever written in Telugu.
