= Allasani Peddana =

Telugu poet

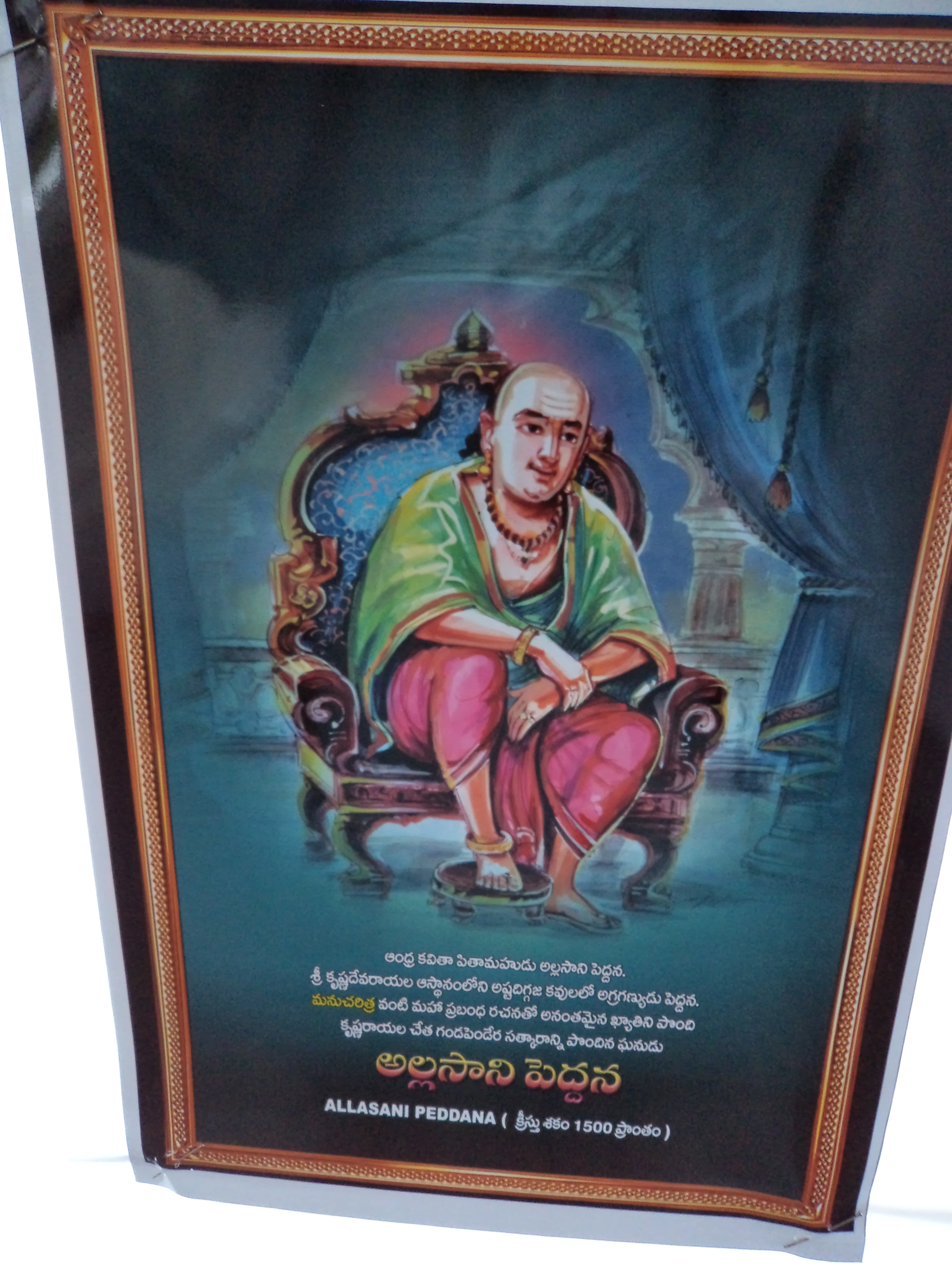
Portrait of Allasani Peddanna

Mahakavi Allasani Peddana (c. 15th and 16th centuries CE) was a prominent Telugu poet and the foremost Ashtadiggaja in the imperial court of Emperor Krishnadevaraya of Vijayanagara.

== Biography ==
His birthplace is contested. Alternatives include:

- He is a native of Pedda Dornala of present Prakasam district.
- Peddana was a native of Somandepalli near Anantapur. He moved to Peddanapadu, a small village near Yerraguntla in Kadapa District, which is an Agraharam given by Krishnadevarayalu.

He wrote the first major Prabandha, a form of Telugu poetry. He is revered as Andhra Kavita Pitamahudu (the grand father of Telugu poetry). He was also a minister in the king's court and is hence sometimes referred as Peddanaamaatyudu (Sandhi: Peddana + Amaatyudu = Peddana, the minister). He dedicated his works to king Krishnadevarayalu.

=== Legends ===
- The emperor himself lifted the palanquin in which Peddana was seated.
- He was bestowed with Kanakabhishekam by the king.
- He was the only poet who had the privilege of riding royal elephants.
- On the demise of Sri Krishnadeva Raya, Peddana expressed his profound sorrow, saying, " Atti Krishna Rayala thoti divikegaleka brathiki yundithi jeevatchavambu naguchu" ("I became a living dead by not going to heaven along with Sri Krishnadeva Raya.")

== Works ==
His most notable work was Swaarochisha Manu Sambhavam (also known as Manu Charitramu). This work describes an episode in Markandeya-purana relating to the birth of Svarochisha-manu, who is one of the fourteen Manus. Pravara, a pious Brahmin youth. goes to the Himalayas for sightseeing, where a Gandharva woman called Varudhini falls in love with him. Pravara rejects her love as he is married. Knowing this, a Gandharva youth who was earlier rejected by Varudhini, assumes the form of Pravara and wins her love. The couple's child is Svarochi, the father of Svarochisha-manu.

Other works such as Harikathaasaaramu are untraceable now.

Krishnadevaraya ornamented Peddana's leg with a golden bangle/bracelet called ganda-penderam as a mark of excellent poetry

== Style ==
The theme for his Manu Charitra is a short story from Markandeya Purana. It is about the second of fourteen Manus (fathers of society according to Hindu mythology). It was translated into Telugu from Sanskrit by Marana (1291–1323), disciple of Tikkana. The original story was around 150 poems that Peddana extended into six chapters of 600 poems by adding fiction and descriptions. His work was treated as one of the Pancha Kavyas, the five best works in Telugu. Peddana used a mix of words from Telugu and Sanskrit.

== Recognition ==
- Andhra Kavita Pitamaha by Krishnadevaraya.
- His style of poetry was described as 'Allasani Vari Allika Jigi Bigi' by Viswanatha Satyanarayana.

== See also ==
- Srinatha, the first Telugu Prabandha writer.

== Notes ==
- A Great Compilation of Telugu poets / poetesses
- Peddana Allasani
- Peddana style
- K.A. Nilakanta Sastry, History of South India, From Prehistoric times to fall of Vijayanagar, 1955, OUP, New Delhi (Reprinted 2002) ISBN 0-19-560686-8
- Golden age of Telugu Literature
- Literary activity in Vijayanagara Empire

== Modern editions ==
- The Story of Manu, by Allasani Peddana, translated by Velcheru Narayana Rao and David Shulman, Murty Classical Library of India, Harvard University Press (January 2015), hardcover, 656 pages, ISBN 9780674427761
