= Bhavanarayana Temple, Sarpavaram =

Hindu temple in Andhra Pradesh, India

Sri Bhavanarayana Swamy Temple
- Location in Andhra Pradesh

Religion
- Affiliation: Hinduism
- District: Kakinada district
- Deity: Lord Bhavanarayana (Vishnu)
- Festivals: Ugadi, Vaisakha Sudha Ekadasi, Karthika Pournami, Ratha Saptami

Location
- Location: Sarpavaram, Kakinada
- State: Andhra Pradesh
- Country: India
- Interactive map of Sri Bhavanarayana Swamy Temple
- Coordinates: 16°57′N 82°15′E

Architecture
- Type: South Indian
- Completed: Prior to 1073 CE
- Inscriptions: Eastern Chalukyas, Kulottunga I, Reddi Kingdom

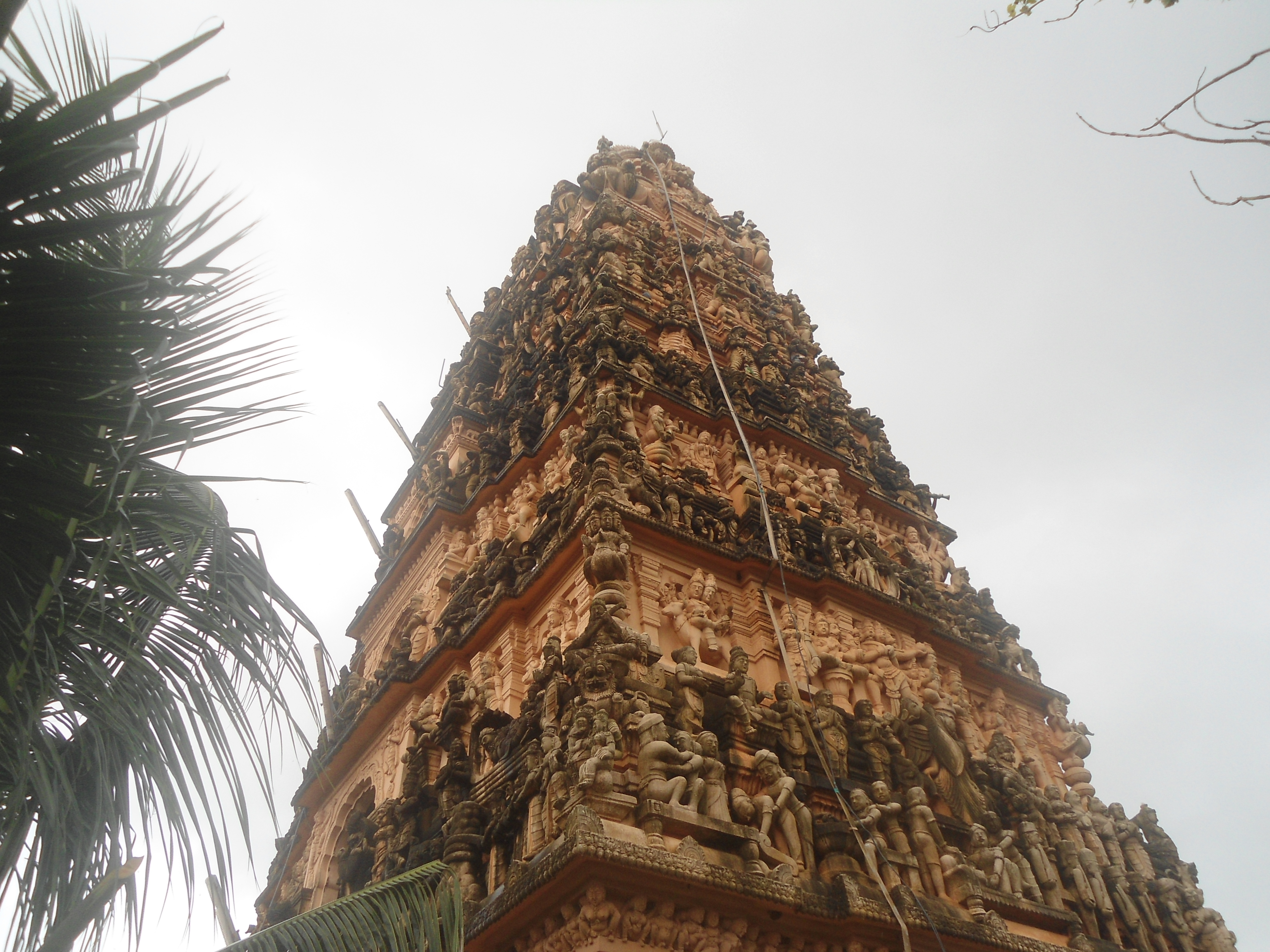

Sri Bhavanarayana Swamy Temple is a historic Hindu temple dedicated to Lord Vishnu, located in Sarpavaram, approximately 5 km from Kakinada in Andhra Pradesh, India. The temple is recognized as one of the State Protected Monuments by the Archaeological Survey of India (ASI) in Andhra Pradesh and is renowned for its religious significance and historical inscriptions.

The temple's history is recorded in several inscriptions, the earliest of which is dated 1073 CE, indicating that the temple likely existed earlier. Over the centuries, the temple underwent repairs and reconstructions, reflecting the patronage of successive rulers. In addition to its historical significance, the temple features prominently in regional literature. It is referenced in 15th-century Telugu works by the poet Srinatha, such as Kasi Khandamu and Bhimeswara Puranam.

== History ==
The Bhavanarayana Temple holds historical and architectural importance, reflecting the contributions and patronage of various dynasties over centuries. Inscriptions found in the temple provide evidence of contributions by Eastern Chalukyan kings, Chola King Kulottunga, and Kataya Vema Reddi (1414 CE) of the Reddi Kingdom. Over centuries, the temple underwent repairs and reconstructions, reflecting the patronage of successive rulers.

As of 1995, 32 inscriptions have been published from the temple, dating from the 11th to the 14th century CE. The earliest inscription, dated to 1073 CE, suggests that the temple may have been constructed prior to this period. It documents a donation of 50 cows by a woman named Meenavana Mahadevi for maintaining a perpetual lamp in the temple. Similar inscriptions from the following centuries also record donations of cows for the upkeep of lamps.

Several other inscriptions, dating to the early 13th century, document grants made by a ruler identified as Vishnuvardhana Maharaja, who is believed to be the same as the local chieftain Mallapa III.

The temple is also referenced in 15th-century literary works by the poet Srinatha, including Kasi Khandamu and Bhimeswara Puranam. These texts further emphasize the temple's prominence in regional religious and cultural traditions.

A gopuram of the temple was constructed at considerable expense by a ruler of Pithapuram.

== Architecture ==
Architecturally, the temple exemplifies a blend of Chalukyan and Chola styles, characterized by red stone masonry and intricate carvings. The construction of the Stambha Mandapa (Navaranga), Sukhansi, and Garbhagruha is attributed to the Chalukyas. The temple’s gopura (tower) features elaborate depictions of various deities and mythological scenes, while the pillars and mandapa (hall) display intricate carvings, including the detailed representations of the dwarapalakas (gatekeepers), Jaya and Vijaya.

== Legend ==
The origins of the temple are rooted the Brahma Vaivarta Purana. The great sage Agastya narrated the tale of Sarpavaram to other sages in the Nymisha forest. According to the legend, Sage Kasyapa's wife, Kadru, gave birth to a thousand serpent sons. When Kadru's trick to deceive her co-wife Vinata failed due to her sons' disobedience, she cursed them to perish in King Janamejaya's serpent sacrifice. Ananta, one of Kadru's pious sons, chose to perform penance at Sarpavaram to seek Lord Vishnu's protection. Lord Vishnu, pleased with Ananta's devotion, appeared and declared that the place would be named "Sarpapura" in his honour, promising that He and His consort Lakshmi would reside there and would be consecrated there by sage Narada.

== Deities ==
The Bhavanarayana Temple is dedicated to its main deity, Lord Bhavanarayana Swamy, who is worshipped alongside his consort, Sri Rajyalakshmi Devi. Within the Paatala Bhavanarayana Swamy Temple, the deity is depicted seated on Garuda. Opposite to the main shrine, Rajyalakshmi Devi has her own dedicated space. The temple also houses a shrine for Manavala Mahamuni near the main deity.

The temple complex includes additional shrines dedicated to Garudadeva and Lord Hanuman.

== Festivals ==
The temple celebrates several key festivals:

- Ugadi (March/April)
- Vaisakha Sudha Ekadasi (May)
- Jyeshta Sudha Ekadasi (June)
- Karthika Pournami and Ekadasi (November)
- Ratha Saptami (February)

== Condition ==
Despite its historical and religious importance, the temple is currently in a deteriorating state. Cracks on pillars and rainwater seepage have raised concerns about structural safety. Local devotees and spiritual leaders, including Chaganti Koteswara Rao and Garikapati Narasimha Rao, have called for government intervention to preserve this ancient temple.

== Significance ==
The temple is considered one of the holiest sites, visited by saints like Agastya and Vyasa. It holds the promise of divine blessings and salvation for devotees who worship here or reside nearby. The location has been esteemed as a sacred Punya Kshetra since ancient times, with royal patronage from the Rajas of Pithapuram supporting grand festivities.

== See also ==
- List of Hindu temples in Andhra Pradesh
- Vaishnavism
