= Mamidipudi Venkatarangayya =

Indian historian

- Born: 8 January 1889; Purini, Nellore district, Madras Presidency, British India
- Died: 13 January 1982 (aged 93); Secunderabad
- Citizenship: India
- Education: B.A., M.A.
- Alma mater: Pachaiyappa's College; Madras University
- Spouse: Venkamma
- Children: Anandam
- Writing career
- Notable work: Sangraha Andhra Vignana Kosham
- Notable awards: Padma Bhushan

Mamidipudi Venkatarangayya (8 January 1889 – 13 January 1982) was a writer, scholar, and political scientist from Andhra Pradesh, India. He was a recipient of the Padma Bhushan in 1968 by the Indian Government.

== Early life ==
Mamidipudi Venkatarangayya was born in 1889 in a Puduru Dravida Brahmin family in Purini village of Kovur taluq in Nellore district. His parents were Venkatesayya and Narasamma. He joined the Pachaiyappa's College and completed B.A. in 1907 from Madras University. While working as a Tutor in the Pachiappa's college, he took his M.A. degree in History, Economics and Politics in 1910 from the same university. He actively participated in the Indian Independence Movement during the study period.

== Teaching ==
He was appointed as Diwan of Vizianagaram Samsthanam in 1927. He joined as principal of Venkatagiri Raja College in Nellore from 1928 to 1931. Later he joined Andhra University as reader in 1931 and became professor in 1938 and retired as principal of University college in 1944.

He was invited by Bombay University to head the Political and Social Sciences department between 1949 and 1952.

He died at his residence at Secunderabad in 1982 at the age of 93 years.

== Literary works ==
He wrote many books on Indian history, constitution, encyclopedia, panchayati raj and politics.

- Chief Editor of Sangraha Andhra Vignana Kosam published by Andhra Vignana Kosa Samithi, Hyderabad (1958–1969)
- Panchayati raj in Andhra Pradesh, published by State Chamber of Panchayati Raj in 1967
- Mārutunna samājaṃ, nā jñāpakālu, Telugu Vidyārthi Pracuraṇalu, 1981
- Āndhralō svātantryasamaramu, Saṃskr̥tika Vyavahāraśākha, Āndhrapradēś Prabhutvamu, 1972
- Evariki mī ōṭu?, Yaṃ. Śēṣācalaṃ aṇḍ Kampenī, 1951
- The freedom struggle in Andhra Pradesh (Andhra), Andhra Pradesh State Committee Appointed for the Compilation of a History of the Freedom Struggle in Andhra Pradesh (Andhra), 1965
- Free and fair elections, Publications Division, Ministry of Information and Broadcasting, Government of India, 1966
- The fundamental rights of man in theory and practice, Hind kitabs, 1944
- The general election in the city of Bombay, 1952, Vora, 1953
- Indian federalism, Arnold-Heinemann Publishers (India), 1975
- Local government in India, Allied Publishers, 1969
- Mana paripālakulu, 1962
- Mana śāsana sabhalu, 1963
- Mānavahakkyulu, lēka, Prāthamika svatva siddhantamu, Jātīya Jñāna Mandiramu, 1946
- Pāriśrāmika viplavaṃ, 1964
- Some aspects of democratic politics in India, University of Mysore, 1967
- Some theories of federalism, University of Poona, 1971
- Vidyāraṅgaṃ, nāḍu-nēḍu, Telugu Vidyārthi Pracuraṇalu, 1982
- Vidyārthulaku okamāṭa, 1965
- The welfare state and the socialist state, Triveni Publishers, 1962
- Mārutunna samājaṃ, nā jñāpakālu, Telugu Vidyārthi Pracuraṇalu, 1981
- Āndhralō svātantryasamaramu, 1972

== Family ==
He married Venkamma and they had ten children: Annapurna, Godavari, Mamidipudi Narasimham, Mamidipudi Seetharam, Mamidipudi Anandam, Mamidipudi Venkateswarlu, Pattabhiram, Mamidipudi Krishnamurti, and Mamidipudi Simhachalam and Vaidehi.

Mamidipudi Anandam is a chartered accountant and twice Rajya Sabha member. Shanta Sinha is daughter of Anandam. She was awarded Padma Shri and also the Ramon Magsaysay in the year 2004. Mamidipudi Ravindra Vikram son of M. Anandam was chartered accountant director of Indian Bank, Indian Overseas Bank and RBI nominee on the Bank of Rajasthan.

Mamidipudi Pattabhiram was Associate Editor of The Hindu. Mamidipudi Krishnamurthi retired as the Chief Controller R&D, Government of India.

== Mamidipudi Venkatarangaiya Foundation ==
Mamidipudi Venkatarangaiya Foundation was established in his memory in 1981 and presently working from Secunderabad. Their fields of working are Child Rights, Health and Natural Resource Management.

Shantha Sinha, Secretary of the Mamidipudi Venkatarangaiya (MV) Foundation, won the Ramon Magsaysay Award for Community Leadership in 2003.
