= Jakkana =

Peram Raju Jakkana is a famous Telugu poet in the early 15th century (1450). He was born to Akkamamba and Annayamathyulu in a Niyogi Brahmin family. He served as a poet in the court of Proudha Devarayalu. His famous work is Vikramarka Charithramu, which he dedicated to Vennelakanti Sidhanamatya, the minister of treasury in the court of Proudha Devarayalu. This work describes the legend of Vikramaditya, the king of Ujjain.

Jakkana is a contemporary of Srinatha and Pothana.

His work Vikramarka Charitramu was published in 1913 by Vavilla Ramaswamy Sastrulu and Sons, Madras. It was published in 1968 by Andhra Pradesh Sahitya Akademi, Hyderabad.
