= Chaganti =

Chaganti (Telugu: చాగంటి) is a Telugu surname.

== People with the name ==
- Chaganti Koteswara Rao (born 1959), Indian speaker on Sanatana Dharma
- Chaganti Somayajulu (1915–1994), Telugu writer
- Aneesh Chaganty (born 1991), American film director and screenwriter

== See also ==
- Chaganti Vari Palem, a village in Guntur district
