= Mamidipudi Venkatarangaiya Foundation =

Indian NGO

The Mamidipudi Venkatarangaiya Foundation (MVF) is an Indian non-government organisation (NGO) established in 1981 in memory of educationist and historian Prof. Mamidipudi Venkataraangaiya by Prof. Shantha Sinha The MVF began as a research institution on issues relating to social transformation. Today, the Foundation is building the capacities of community in rural and urban areas for abolition of child labour by universalizing social education. It uses an "area-based" approach instead of a target-based approach. The area-based approach concentrates on protecting the rights of every children and ensuring all of them attend full-time formal education. It draws plans for children to withdraw from work and prepare them to be integrated into schools. Schemes were also designed to ensure that children are retained in school and will continue to do so without any disruption.

== Objectives ==
Universalizing formal education has been one of the foundation's key objectives. It seeks to address the rights of the entire universes of children -- both in school and out of school -- in the 5-14 age group and its area of operation. It sees children who are deprived of education opportunities as intrinsically hazardous to their growth and well-being. The MV Foundation also ensures that every child attending school does so without any disruption until they reach Class 10 since there is no guarantee that the child does not get pushed out of school to join the labour force again.

== Impact ==
Over the years, over 1,000,000 children have been freed from child labour, enrolled and retained in school, more than 4,000 bonded labourers have been released and 168 villages in Andhra Pradesh are now child labour-free. The core strategy of MV Foundation of achieving its objective of transforming child labourers to students is through the residential bridge camps. It has been implemented in more than 6,000 villages and an estimated 45,000 child labourers have thus benefited from these bridge camps. Through the Stop Child Labor Campaigns and Child Rights Protection Forum (CPRF), they had successfully mobilised communities to establish a social norm against child labour and to understand that school is a fundamental right of a child.

The greatest impact is the direct cooperation of the MV Foundation with the government of Andhra Pradesh, facilitating the application of the MVF approach in the entire state. It has also leveraged on the support of every section of society on a village and national level to create the community pressures for ensuring sustainability in its institutions and strategies.

== Enrolling children into schools ==
The MV Foundation uses a variety and combination of strategies to enroll children into schools and into classes appropriate to their age. One of the strategies is the MVF Bridge Camp. These are residential camps in which children spend between three and eighteen months depending on their need.

The camp enables children to catch up on missed education and serves as an adjustment period for both child and family. They are given opportunities to interact with peers of their own age and get accustomed to the new lifestyle at their own pace. Meanwhile, parents adapt to the changes in their child and their role as parents of a student.

== Challenges of enrolling children into schools ==
One key concern related to the residential bridge camps is the use of residential bridge camp. There are worries that there might be the risks of a place where children’s rights are being abused rather than respected. Furthermore, concerns regarding separation of children from their own families and their cultural identity are also being raised.
