= Recognition of same-sex unions in Andhra Pradesh =

Andhra Pradesh does not recognise same-sex marriages or civil unions. However, live-in relationships are not unlawful in Andhra Pradesh. The Indian Supreme Court has held that adults have a constitutional right to live together without being married, and that police cannot interfere with consenting adults living together. The Andhra Pradesh High Court upheld this constitutional right in Chadalavada Pallavi v. State of Andhra Pradesh in December 2024.

== Legal history ==
=== Background ===
Marriage in India is governed under several federal laws. These laws allow for the solemnisation of marriages according to different religions, notably Hinduism, Jainism, Buddhism, Christianity, Islam, Sikhism and Zoroastrianism. Every citizen has the right to choose which law will apply to them based on their community or religion. These laws are the Hindu Marriage Act, 1955, the Indian Christian Marriage Act, 1872, the Muslim Personal Law (Shariat) Application Act, 1937, the Anand Marriage Act, 1909, and the Parsi Marriage and Divorce Act, 1936. The Special Marriage Act, 1954 (SMA; Telugu: ప్రత్యేక వివాహ చట్టం, ౧౯౫౪, Pratyēka Vivāha Caṭṭaṁ; Urdu: خصوصی شادی قانون، ۱۹۵۴ء, Xusūsī Śādī Qānūn) allows civil marriage officers to solemnize and register marriages for all Indian citizens regardless of the religion of either party. Although the vast majority of marriages in India continue to be solemnized and registered under the traditional religious personal laws, the SMA has become popular among interfaith couples, inter-caste couples, and spouses with no religious beliefs. None of these acts explicitly bans same-sex marriage.

On 14 February 2006, the Supreme Court of India ruled in Smt. Seema v. Ashwani Kumar that the states and union territories are obliged to register all marriages performed under the federal laws. The court's ruling was expected to reduce instances of child marriages, bigamy, domestic violence and unlawful abandonment. Andhra Pradesh had already passed legislation requiring the registration of all marriages prior to the Supreme Court ruling. The Andhra Pradesh Legislature, consisting of the Legislative Council and the Legislative Assembly, passed the Andhra Pradesh Compulsory Registration of Marriages Act, 2002, which was later signed into law by Governor C. Rangarajan. It created local registrars that issue marriage licenses to prospective spouses. Registrars may refuse to issue licenses if the parties fail to meet the requirements to marry under the federal marriage laws. The act defines marriage as "all marriages performed by persons belonging to any caste or religion and also the marriages performed as per any custom, practices or any traditions including the marriages performed in the tribal areas and the word 'marriage' also includes 'remarriage'". However, the act generally refers to married spouses as "bride and bridegroom".

Traditional Telugu marriages (వివాహం, vivāhaṁ) are deeply rooted in custom and hold significant cultural importance. They involve elaborate pre-wedding preparations and culminate in key rituals, including the tying of the mangala sutra and the saptapadi. Arranged marriage remains the prevailing norm across India, accounting for the vast majority of unions, and often placing pressure on LGBT individuals to marry partners of the opposite sex. Nevertheless, some same-sex couples have participated in traditional marriage ceremonies, although the marriages lack legal status in Andhra Pradesh. On 18 December 2021, two men, Supriyo Chakraborty and Abhay Dang, were married in a Hindu ceremony in Hyderabad, the de jure capital of Andhra Pradesh, making "it the first gay wedding in the Telugu States". Their wedding was attended by family members and close friends. "Our parents weren't initially the most supportive. However, they also didn't disapprove of it either. They decided to give us and themselves a good amount of time to introspect and come to a better conclusion. Now, we have their acceptance", said Chakraborty. In August 2022, a lesbian couple were married in a traditional Hindu ceremony in Srikalahasti. One of the women had previously been married to a man, but after meeting each other they decided to elope. They later asked for police protection in Vempalle.

=== Live-in relationships ===
Recognition of same-sex unions in India

Live-in relationships (Telugu: కలిసి నివసించే సంబంధం, kalisi nivasiñcē sambandhaṁ, pronounced [ˈkalisi ˈniʋasiɲtɕeː ˈsambandʱam], or లివ్-ఇన్ రిలేషన్‌షిప్, liv-in rilēṣanṣip; Urdu: اکٹھے رہنے کا تعلق, akathē rahnē kā ta'alluq) are not illegal in Andhra Pradesh. The Indian Supreme Court has held that adults have a constitutional right to live together without being married, that police cannot interfere with consenting adults living together, and that live-in relationships are not unlawful. State courts have upheld this constitutional right, and further ruled that if a couple faces threats from family or the community they may request police protection. However, live-in relationships do not confer all the legal rights and benefits of marriage. On 17 December 2024, the Andhra Pradesh High Court affirmed the right of adults in same-sex relationships to live together in Chadalavada Pallavi v. State of Andhra Pradesh. The case involved a lesbian couple who had been forcefully separated by family members. The petitioner, Chadalavada Pallavi, filed a habeas corpus petition seeking to live with her partner who had been abducted by her father and kept in forceful custody. The High Court ruled that the right to life and dignity under Article 21 of the Constitution guarantees adults, regardless of gender, the freedom to live with their chosen partner without interference from family members. It ordered the police to protect the couple.

=== Transgender and intersex issues ===
Like most of South Asia, Andhra Pradesh recognizes a traditional third gender community known as hijra (హిజ్రా, hijrā), historically holding respected community roles, and known for their distinct culture, communities led by gurus, and traditional roles as performers. In the Telugu states, the community is also referred to as śiva-śakti (శివ-శక్తి, pronounced [ˈʃiʋaʃakti]). Every autumn during a three-day festival performed across Andhra Pradesh and Telangana, they are married to a sword that represents male power or Shiva, becoming the brides of the sword. One of the avatars of Shiva, a central figure in Hinduism, is Ardhanarishvara, who is depicted as half-man and half-woman, representing Shiva united with his shakti. The śiva-śakti identify with this form of Shiva and worship at Shiva temples. The religious meaning of the śiva-śakti role is expressed in several Hindu stories, including those of Arjuna, Shiva, Bahuchara Mata and Krishna. Most people in this community belong to lower socio-economic status and live as astrologers, soothsayers, and spiritual healers.

The Supreme Court's 2023 ruling in Supriyo v. Union of India held that the Indian Constitution does not require the legalisation of same-sex marriages but affirmed that transgender people may marry opposite-sex partners. There had already been some marriages of men to transgender women in Andhra Pradesh prior to the Supreme Court ruling, including in Tirumala in 2019.

== See also ==
- Recognition of same-sex unions in India
- Supriyo v. Union of India
