= Telugu Brahmins =

Community of Telugu speaking Brahmins

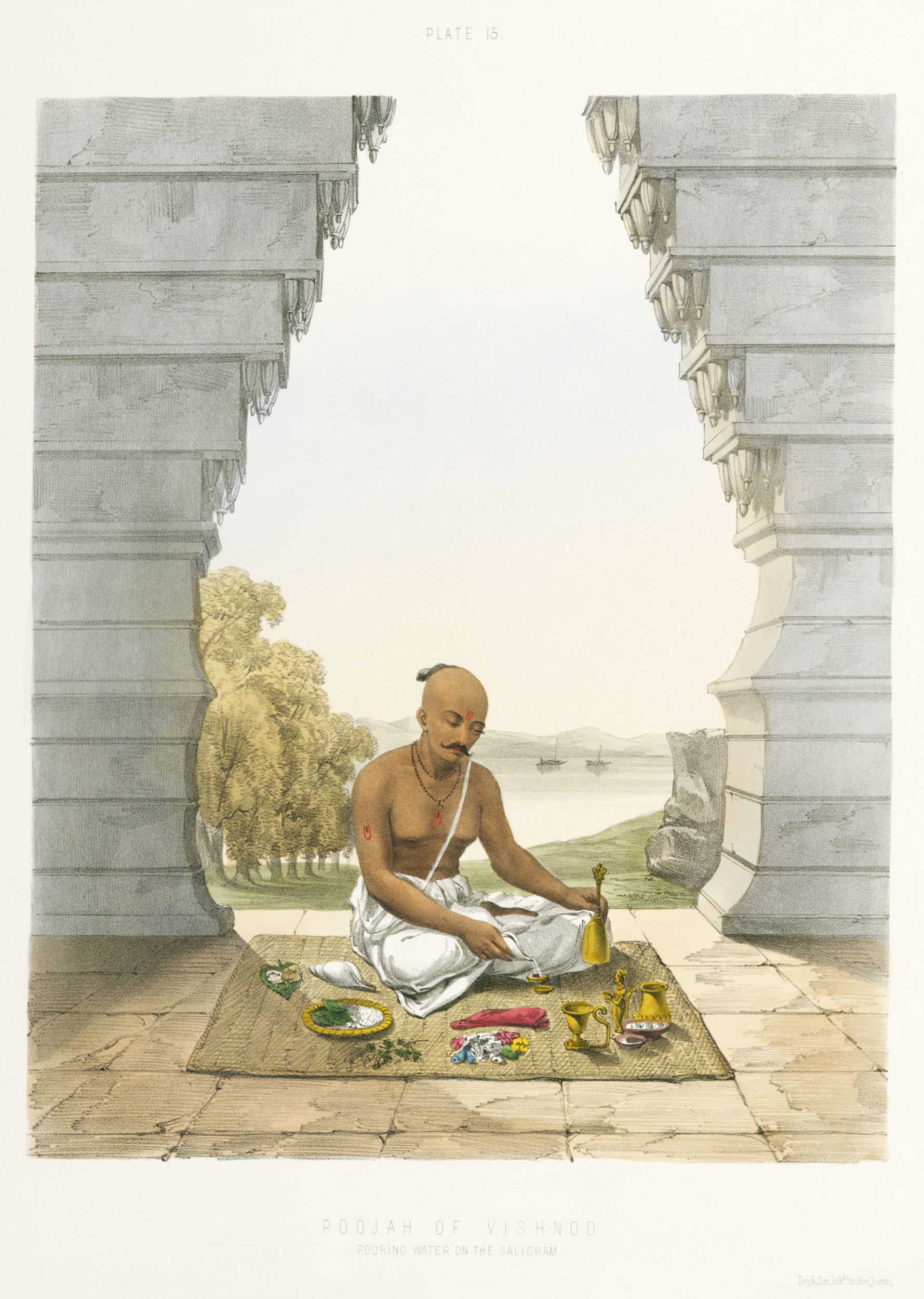
A Telugu Brahmin performing Nityakarma.

Telugu Brahmins (Note: Now they are sometimes referred as Andhra Brahmins and Telangana Brahmins after the bifurcation of the states.) are ethnic-Telugus who belong to Brahmin communities native to the Indian states of Andhra Pradesh and Telangana. They fall under the Pancha Dravida Brahmin classification of the Brahmin community in India. Telugu Brahmins are further divided into sections like Vaidiki, Niyogi, Deshastha, Dravida, Golkonda Vyapari among others.

== History ==
The Apastamba Dharmasutra is posited to have been composed in the region of modern-day Andhra Pradesh between the Godavari and Krishna rivers, but this is not certain. It is dated to approximately 600-300 BCE, and more narrowly to between 450 and 350 BCE.

== Related communities ==
Brahmin is a varna ([ classification]]) within Hindu society. Brahmins have traditionally been Hindu priests, either in temples or to particular families and have traditionally been better educated and held high positions.

Telugu Brahmins fall under the Pancha Dravida Brahmin classification of the Brahmin community in India. Kalhana, in his Rajatarangini (c. 12th century CE), classifies five Brahmin communities as Pancha Dravida, noting that they reside south of the Vindhya Range. These communities are traditionally listed as:

1. Drāviḍa – Referring to the Brahmins of Tamil Nadu and Brahmins of Kerala.
2. Āndhra (Tailaṅga) – Representing the Telugu Brahmins of Andhra Pradesh and Telangana.
3. Karnāṭa – Referring to the Karnataka Brahmins.
4. Madhyadeśa – Identified with Mahārāshtraka in variant readings, representing the Marathi Brahmin.
5. Gurjara – Representing the Gujarati Brahmins, Marwari Brahmins, and Mewari Brahmins.

== Sub-divisions ==
Telugu Brahmins are categorized into various groups based on factors such as occupation, denomination, region, and other cultural distinctions.

1. Vaidiki (వైదికి)
  1. Mulakanāḍu (ములకనాడు)
  2. Telagānyaṁ (తెలగాన్యం)
  3. Velanāḍu (వెలనాడు)
  4. Kāsalanāḍu (కాసలనాడు)
  5. Karṇakammalu (కర్ణకమ్మలు)
  6. Vēṅgināḍu (వేంగినాడు)
  7. Kōnasīma (కోనసీమ)
  8. Ārādhya (ఆరాధ్య)
  9. Prathamasākhi (ప్రథమసాకి)
2. Niyōgi (నియోగి)
  1. Āruvela (ఆరువెల)
  2. Nandavārikulu (నందవారికులు)
  3. Kammalu (కమ్మలు)
  4. Pēsalavayālu (పేసలవయాలు)
  5. Praṅganāḍu (ప్రంగనాడు)
  6. Prathamasāki (ప్రథమసాకి)
3. Gōlkoṇḍa Vyāpārulu (గోల్కొండ వ్యాపారులు)
4. Dēśasthulu (దేశస్థులు)
5. Taṁbalalu (తంబలలు)
  1. Taṁbala (తంబల)
6. Drāviḍulu (ద్రావిడులు; assimilated ethnic-Tamil migrants from Tamil Nadu aka Drāviḍadeśam)
  1. Puḍūra Drāviḍa (పుడూర ద్రావిడ)
  2. Tummaguṇṭa Drāviḍa (తుమ్మగుంట ద్రావిడ)
  3. Perūr Drāviḍa (పెరూర్ ద్రావిడ)
  4. Ārāma Drāviḍa (ఆరామ ద్రావిడ)

Several Telugu Brahmin subgroups (who are predominantly smartas), such as Velanāḍu, Mulakanāḍu, and Vēngināḍu, derive their names from specific geographical regions. These territorial names are also shared by some non-Brahmin communities, indicating a broader cultural association.

The Ārādhyas hold a distinct position within the Telugu Brahmin community. Among the Karṇakammalu (a prominent Telugu Brahmin sect), sub-sections such as Ōgōti and Koljedu are notable. Members of these groups follow the Rig Śākhā tradition, a branch of the Rig Veda.

The Telagānyams represent a diverse group, with some adhering to the Rig Veda and others following the Yajur Veda (Yajurveda and Shukla Yajur Veda). The Nandavārikulu, who are exclusively Rig Vedic, worship Chaudēswari, the goddess of the Devānga community, as their patron deity. Traditionally, the Nandavārikulu Brahmins acting as gurus (spiritual guides) to the Devāngas.

A unique feature of the Telugu Brahmins is their use of house names, or intiperulu, a practice shared with non-Brahmin Telugu communities. These family names often reference elements from nature or daily life, such as Kōta (fort), Lanka (island), Puchcha (Citrullus colocynthis), Chintha (Tamarindus indica), and Kāki (Corvus levaillantii). Among the Niyōgi Brahmins, house names often end with the word raju or razu, reflecting a connection to aristocratic or landowning traditions.

=== Denominational divisions ===
Smarta, Madhva, Vaikhanasa, Sri Vaishnava, Shaiva and Shakta.

- Even though in Andhra Pradesh and Telangana regions majority of Vaidikis and Niyogis are Smartas, who follow Advaita Vedanta of Adi Shankara, there are some sections among them who migrated and settled in Karnataka and Tamil Nadu region that follow Dvaita Vedanta of Madhvacharya.
- Sri Vaishnavas and Telugu Madhvas are Telugu Brahmins who converted to Ramanuja and Madhvacharya faith respectively.
- Niyogis are further subdivided into Aruvela Niyogis, Pakanati Niyogis and others.
- Golkonda Vyaparis were said to be a part of Niyogis, but they consider themselves as separate group and have their own community organizations. The word vyapari means trader. Golconda Vyaparis are Vaishnavas and have both Madhvas and Sri Vaishnavas among them.
- Telugu Madhvas and Deshastha Madhvas are mainly followers of Uttaradi Matha, Raghavendra Matha and Vyasaraja Matha.
- Deshastha Brahmins are mainly divided into two groups Deshastha Madhva Brahmins and Deshastha Smartha Brahmins. In Telangana, Deshastha Brahmins are spread throughout all the districts of the state, while in Andhra Pradesh, they are mainly concentrated in Rayalaseema, Nellore, and Godavari-Krishna delta, especially in the cities of Kurnool, Anantapur, Kadapa, Chittoor, Nellore, Rajahmundry, Guntur and Hyderabad. Marriage alliance between Deshastha Brahmins, other Telugu Brahmins and Karnataka Brahmins takes place quite frequently.
- Dravidulu are migrants from Tamil Nadu dating to Chalukya era and speak Telugu at their homes.

== Art ==
A specific area of Vaidiki Telugu Brahmins have curated a specific style of classical dance called Kuchipudi- named after the village they are from. Around five-hundred families belonged to this village, and its classical dance form is referenced in Machupalli Kaifat of 1502. Mainly a male dominated dance field in its early stages, Kuchipudi was known for its dance dramas and lively depictions of characters.

== Customs ==
Andhra Brahmins, differ from Tamil Brahmins in certain rituals, attire, and sectarian marks. Telugu Brahmin women wear their saree without passing it between the legs (kaccha kattu), with the free end draped over the left shoulder unlike Madisar which goes to right shoulder. Their sect mark typically consists of three horizontal streaks of bhasmā (vibhūti or sacred ashes) or a single streak of sandal paste (gandham) with a circular black spot in the center (akshintalu bottu).

The marriage badge, or bottu, is tied during the nagavali day after a mock pilgrimage (kāsiyātra). The bride worships Gauri sitting in a basket of paddy or cholam. After tying the bottu, rice (Talambralu) is showered on the couple.

Telugu Brahmin women also perform various rituals (vratams), similar to other communities in the region. Gauri is a favoured deity in many of these rituals.

Telugu Brahmin wedding rituals differ significantly from others, though initial preparations like pelli choopulu (match-making), nischaya tambulaalu (nischitartham or nngagement), and eduru sannaham are similar. The most distinct feature is the kasi yatra. In this playful ritual, the groom, dressed as a renunciant with an umbrella and wooden sandals, declares his intent to forsake worldly life for sannyasa (sainthood). The bride’s brother intervenes, convincing him to embrace grihastasrama (marriage). Traditionally held at the bride’s home, modern ceremonies often take place in wedding venues. The kasi yatra is symbolic of spiritual progression but is performed with joy, laughter, and family involvement.

== Occupation ==
=== Pre-Independence ===
Niyogi Brahmins served as village record keepers (karanams/Kombattulas), poets, and sometimes ministers. Deshastha Brahmins also served as village record keepers (karanams) and many also served as high-level administrators and bureaucrats such as Deshmukhs, Sheristadars, Tehsildars, Deshpandes and Majumdars under Qutb Shahis of Golkonda and Nizams of Hyderabad in Andhra Pradesh and Telangana.

Niyogi Brahmins and Deshastha Brahmins also ruled Andhra Pradesh as zamindars. In Guntur district, one of the four major zamindars i.e., Chilakaluripet zamindari and Sattenapalle zamindari were ruled by Deshastha Brahmins, whose title was "Deshmukh", The Polavaram zamindari of West Godavari district and Lakkavaram zamindari of Prakasam district were ruled by Niyogi Brahmins. Due to their secular occupations, marriage alliances between Deshastha Brahmins, Golkonda Vyapari Brahmins and Niyogi Brahmins was very common since centuries. Vaidiki Brahmins and Dravidulu are priests and teachers.

=== Post-Independence ===
After the implementation of the Land Ceiling Reforms Act in 1973, Niyogi Brahmins and Deshastha Brahmins who had huge amounts of land lost their lands and properties as a result of this. In 1983, after becoming Chief Minister of Andhra Pradesh N. T. Rama Rao abolished Patel–Patwari system prevailing in Andhra Pradesh. As a result of this many Brahmins who had control over the villages as Karanams (revenue officers) lost their control over villages as well as many of their lands and properties.

== Population distribution ==
As per the 1931 census, Brahmins were about three percent in the region constituting present-day Andhra Pradesh (then part of Madras State). According to a survey by Outlook India in 2003, Brahmins were estimated to be around 5% of United Andhra Pradesh population.

== Notable people ==
Philosophy and Religion

- Nimbarkacharya (c. 11th–12th century CE) – Indian philosopher and theologian, founder of the Nimbarka Sampradaya, a school of the Dvaitadvaita (dualistic non-dualism) Vedanta.
- Vidyaranya (c. 1296–1386) was an Indian philosopher and saint, known for his contributions to Advaita Vedanta and for guiding the founders of the Vijayanagara Empire. He authored key texts like Panchadasi and played a major role in the revival of Hinduism in South India.
- Vallabhacharya (1479–1531) – Indian philosopher and theologian, founder of the Pushtimarg sect and proponent of the Shuddhadvaita (pure non-dualism) school of Vedanta.
- Sadasiva Brahmendra (c. 1700–1750) – A revered Indian saint, Advaita philosopher, and composer of Carnatic music, known for his devotional compositions and deep meditative practice. His kritis are still widely sung in South Indian classical music.
- Jiddu Krishnamurti (1895–1986) – Indian spiritual figure, speaker, and writer.

Academics

- K. A. Nilakanta Sastri (1892–1975) – Indian historian who wrote on South Indian history.

Social Activists

- Kandukuri Veeresalingam (1848–1919) – Renowned social reformer, writer, and a key figure in the Telugu Renaissance. He worked extensively towards women's education and widow remarriage in Andhra Pradesh and is regarded as the "Father of the Telugu Renaissance".
- Goparaju Ramachandra Rao (1902–1975) – Indian social reformer, atheist activist, and participant in the Indian independence movement. He is best known for founding the Atheist Centre and promoting rationalist and humanist ideas in India.
- Burgula Ramakrishna Rao (1899–1967) – Indian politician and the first elected Chief Minister of Hyderabad State after its annexation into India. He is known for his pioneering land reforms, including the abolition of the jagirdar and mukthedar systems in Telangana, and for introducing tenancy laws.

Politics

- N. Subba Rao Pantulu (1861–1941) – Indian social reformer, politician, member of the Madras Legislative Council, and one of the founders of The Hindu.
- Tanguturi Prakasam (1872–1957) – Former Chief Minister of Andhra Pradesh.
- Sarvepalli Radhakrishnan (1888–1975) – First Vice President and second President of India.
- K. B. Hedgewar (1889–1940) – Founder and first Sarsanghchalak of the Rashtriya Swayamsevak Sangh (RSS).
- K. L. Rao (1902–1986) – Politician and designer of the Nagarjuna Sagar Dam.
- P. V. Narasimha Rao (1921–2004) – Former Prime Minister of India and recipient of the Bharat Ratna.
- Duddilla Sripada rao (2 March 1935 – 13 April 1999) was an Indian politician and was a member of the Andhra Pradesh Legislative Assembly representing the Indian National Congress.
- Madhukar Dattatraya Deoras (1915–1996) – Third Sarsanghchalak of the Rashtriya Swayamsevak Sangh (RSS).
- Usha Vance (born 1986) - second lady of the United States (2025 - present)

Bureaucrats

- P. V. R. K. Prasad (1940–2017), an Indian civil servant who served as Media Advisor to the Prime Minister of India, P. V. Narasimha Rao from 1991 to 1996.

Music

- Syama Sastri (1762–1827) – musician and composer of Carnatic music and the oldest among the Trinity of Carnatic music.
- Tyagaraja (1767–1847) – One of the greatest composers of Carnatic music, known for his devotional compositions, primarily in praise of Lord Rama. His kritis (compositions) are widely performed and revered in classical music traditions across South India.
- Ghantasala Venkateswara Rao (1922–1974) – Playback singer and music director, known for his work in Telugu cinema, regarded as one of the greatest playback singers in South Indian cinema.
- M. Balamuralikrishna (1930–2016) – Renowned Carnatic vocalist, multi-instrumentalist, composer, and playback singer, known for his deep contributions to Indian classical music.
- S. P. Balasubrahmanyam (1946–2020) – Renowned Indian playback singer, music director, and actor, with a prolific career spanning multiple languages in Indian cinema.

Films

- Sobhita Dhulipala (born 1992) – Indian actress and model, known for her work in films and web series, including Made in Heaven and Ponniyin Selvan: I.

== See also ==
- Caste system in India

== Bibliography ==
- Prasad, P. V. R. K. (2008). When I Saw Tirupati Balaji. Gyan Publishing House. ISBN 978-8121209335.
- Robert Lingat (1973). The Classical Law of India. University of California Press. ISBN 978-0-520-01898-3.
- Patrick Olivelle (1999). Dharmasutras: The Law Codes of Ancient India. Oxford University Press. ISBN 978-0-19-283882-7.
