= Chadalavada Sundararamasastri =

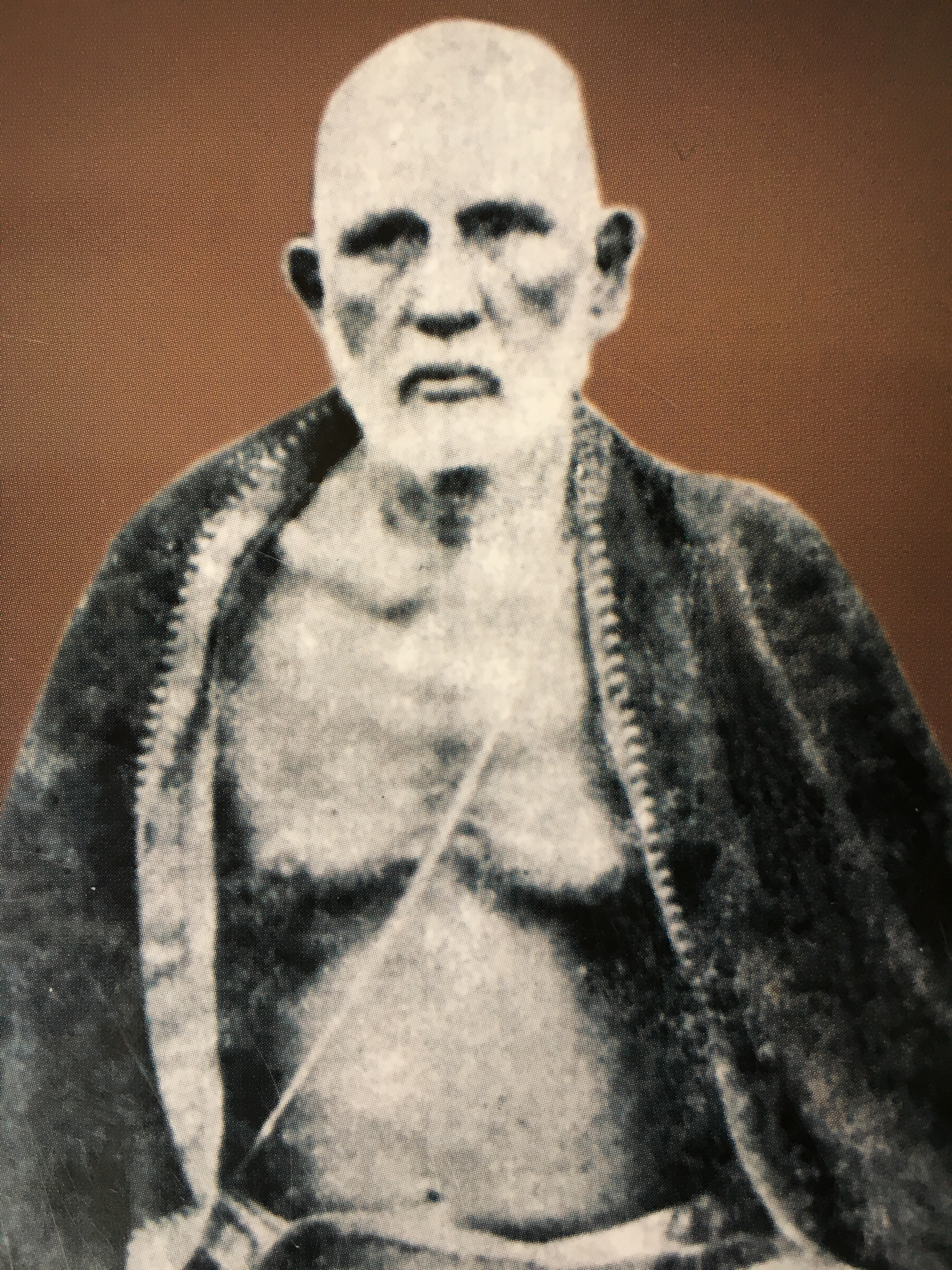
- Born: 1865; Venkannapalem, Writer
- Died: 1925 (aged 59–60)
- Known for: Commentaries on Sanskrit texts in Telugu
- Parent(s): Ramasastri (Father), Sitamma (Mother)

Chadalavada Sundararamasastri (1865–1925) was Telugu Pundit and owner of Telugu Publishing house, Saradamba Vilasa Mudraksharashala. He also authored multiple books and wrote commentaries to many Sanskrit texts in Telugu. He was also awarded a gold bracelet (swarna kankanam) from the Prince of Wales in 1922 for his contribution to Telugu literature.

He was also associated with the famous Vavilla Ramaswamy Sastrulu and Sons publishing house and a close relative of its founder Vavilla Ramaswamy Sastrulu.

== List of books written ==
- Dakshinamurthi Stotra.
- Saswara Andhra Rudhradhyayamu.
- Vedantha Dindhimamu.
- Aparoskhanubhuti.
- Gowthama Smrithi.
- Manudharma Sastram.
- Ambagitham.
- Sri Rama Hridayamu.
- Sri Ramayana Sara Sangrahamu.
- Aditya Hridayamu.
- Dharma Sindhuvu.
- Adi Virata Parvamulu (Tika) in co-operation with Dandigunta Suryanarayana Sastri.
- Vasista Ramayanamu (Prose).
- Jagannadha Satakamu.
- Abhidana Ratnamala.
