= Papayya =

Papayya or Papaiah (Telugu: పాపయ్య) is a male given name. Notable people with the name include:

- Jandhyala Papayya Sastry, an eminent Telugu writer and lyricist
- Vaddadi Papaiah, a painter and illustrator
- Avadhanum Paupiah, a dubash, or interpreter in the service of the British East India Company.
