= Dravida Brahmin =

Caste of Brahmins in southern India

Dravida Brahmins
- Classification: Forward caste
- Religions: Hinduism
- Populated states: Andhra Pradesh, Telangana

Dravida Brahmins, or simply Dravidulu, are Hindu brahmins and a sub-caste of the Telugu Brahmins of Andhra Pradesh in South India, who migrated from Tamil-speaking regions. They are further divided into sub-sects based on the places where they have settled such as Aaraama Dravidulu, Pudur Dravidulu, Konaseema Dravidulu, Peruru Dravidulu, Tummagunta Dravidulu and Dimili Dravidulu. They are primarily categorized as the Saiva Brahmins or followers of Shiva.

== Origin ==
During the reign of Rajaraja Narendra (r. 1022 – 1061 CE), many Tamil Brahmin families settled in different parts of Andhra Pradesh. Under Narendra's son, Kulottunga I (r. 1061 – 1118 CE), the first Chalukya-Chola emperor, several Brahmins migrated from the Tamil country.

His son Virachodadeva, the Viceroy of Vengi, invited 546 Brahmin families and established them at Virachoda Chaturvedimangalam. Several records of the Chalukya-Cholas register the gift of villages in the plains of Godavari river to Brahmins who migrated from Dravidadesa. These Brahmins who had settled in Andhra region are known as the Dravida Brahmins.

== Classification ==
They fall under the Pancha Dravida Brahmin classification of the Brahmin community in India. Dravida Brahmins are divided into several sub-sects, which are named after the places in which they have settled such Aaraama Dravidulu, Puduru Dravidulu, Konaseema Dravidulu, Peruru Dravidulu, Tummagunta Dravidulu and Dimili Dravidulu.

Most of them speak Telugu as their native language after centuries of assimilation, while many Puduru Dravidulu (mainly residing in Nellore district) speak Tamil at home.

== Notable people ==
- Avadhanum Paupiah
- Vavilla Ramaswamy Sastrulu
- Vedam Venkataraya Sastry
- Chadalavada Sundararamasastri
- Chilakamarti Lakshmi Narasimham
- Chellapilla Venkata Sastry
- Ganapati Muni
- Mahamahopadhyaya Tata Subbaraya Sastri
- Alladi Krishnaswamy
- V. S. Ramachandran
- Mamidipudi Venkatarangayya
- Ayyalasomayajula Lalitha
- Adibhatla Narayana Dasu
- Dokka Seetamma Garu
- Ayyagari Sambasiva Rao
- Sri Sri (Srirangam Srinivasa Rao)
- Arudra (Bhagavatula Sadasiva Sankara Sastri)
- Mahamahopadhyaya Vishvanatha Gopala Krishna Sastri
- Ganti Prasada Rao
- Ganti Jogi Somayaji

== See also ==
- Forward Castes
- Iyer
