= Vavilla =

Vavilla is a village in Vidavaluru mandal, Nellore district, Andhra Pradesh, India. This village has three government, two private schools and one Junior college. The Z.P.P. High School government school started functioning since 1984 and its office building (which was demolished in 2012) was constructed by Britishers in early 1900s.

Vavilla is major Panchayth, about 2,500 voters in Vidavalur mandal.

== See also ==
- Vavilla Ramaswamy Sastrulu
