= Golconda Vyapari Brahmin =

Indian Hindu Brahmin subcaste

Regions with significant populations
- Maharashtra, Telangana, Andhra Pradesh

Languages
- Telugu

Religion
- Hinduism (Vaishnava)

Related ethnic groups
- Deshastha Brahmin • Niyogi Brahmin

Golconda Vyapari Brahmin (also referred as Vyapari Brahmins) is a Telugu Brahmin subcaste native to the Indian states of Telangana and Andhra Pradesh, but also found in Maharashtra and other parts of South India. In the Telangana region they served as Patwari (Village accountant) and in Andhra Pradesh region they served as Karanams (Village accountant) and other higher officials under Qutb Shahis of Golconda and Nizams of Hyderabad.

== History ==
Golconda Vyapari Brahmins are a sub-group within Telugu Brahmin community and have their own caste organizations. Golconda Vyaparis are closely related to Deshastha Brahmins and have intimate relations with them. Marriages between Golconda Vyaparis and Deshastha Brahmins are very common.

During the times of the Golconda Sultanate, Deshastha Brahmins who already were serving as high-level administrators under Qutub Shahis replaced Niyogis at the village level as revenue officers with the help of Golconda Vyaparis.

In 1579 Khasa Rayarao, a Deshastha Brahmin who was the Commander-in-Chief of Ibrahim Quli Qutb Shah captured Kondaveedu Fort. After that, Khasa Rayarao was made the Governor of the Kondaveedu Sima (present Guntur district) by changing its name to Murtazanagar Sircar and kept the financial administration of this region in his hands. Khasa Rayarao appointed many Deshastha Brahmins, Golkonda Vyapari Brahmins, Niyogi Brahmins and Kammas as Deshmukhs, Deshpandes, Karanams and Chowdarys.

== Religion ==
Golconda Vyaparis are Vaishnavas and have both Madhvas and Sri Vaishnavas among them. Majority of them are followers of Madhva Sampradaya of Madhvacharya, but there are also a few among them who follow Sri Vaishnavism of Ramanuja.
