= Karanam =

Traditional office and title of village accountants

Karanam or Karnam was an office and title native to the Indian states of Andhra Pradesh and Telangana. Traditionally, Karanam was an official who maintained the accounts and records of the villages and collected the taxes. Karanam was one of the two village-level administrative posts that existed in Andhra along with 'Munasabu' (Munsiff). The Karanam kept an elaborate system of village accounts.

The position of Karanam was traditionally held by Niyogi Brahmins. In the Godavari districts, Kapus held the position as well, while in other regions, it was sometimes occupied by Golkonda Vyapari Brahmins, Deshastha Brahmins, and Karans. The title "Karanam" is comparable to "Kulkarni" in North Karnataka and Maharashtra and "Shanbhaug" in Karnataka.

In 1985, the Chief Minister of Andhra Pradesh, N. T. Rama Rao, abolished the hereditary Karanam system and replaced it with the Village Revenue Officer (VRO) post.

== History ==
The origin of village officers like Karanam is traceable to the evolution of Zamindari system. Zamindars and Jagirdars appointed the village officials who were traditionally known as 'Karanam' and 'Munasubu' (Munsif) in Andhra region. The Munsiff maintained law and order while Karanams maintained land records and collected taxes. Karanams were skilled in writing administrative documents, accounting and file-keeping. Many Karanams were reported to be polyglots. They possessed knowledge of land use, dispute settlement, and local history. The more successful Karanams became 'Mantris' (ministers). In late medieval era, Niyogi Brahmins dominated as Karanams in Andhra, while in Telangana areas of Golkonda kingdom, Vyapari Brahmins were Karanams.

In the 1881 British Indian Census, "Karnam" was a caste that had subgroups of Asira, Balaga, Bhuthi, Dodgiri, Gadavathra, Gavana, Golinta Srusti, Jalama, Kidasa, Nirku, Osa, Ponkaru, Rakala, Rapo Srushti, Rapuru, Singa, Surta, Swasta, Valaraya, Velaroya, Vinna, Viragali, Vodra, Vosu, and Yeliva.

In 1985, then Chief Minister of Andhra Pradesh, N. T. Rama Rao (NTR), abolished the hereditary offices of Karanam, Munasubu and instead replaced them with the Village Revenue Officer (VRO). The move was initiated in pursuance of the recommendations of the Unnitan Committee of 1964 and Narsimha Rao Committee. It was noted that NTR's decision to abolish the Karanam system in revenue administration was one of the reasons for the OBC communities to rally behind his party, Telugu Desam Party (TDP).

== Similar posts ==
The title Karanam is similar to Kulkarni in North Karnataka and Maharashtra and Shanbhaug in Karnataka.

Samprati or Sthala Karanam, who was a counterpart of Karanam at higher level, was usually held by Deshastha Brahmins. The post of Sthala Karanam, who was the district revenue official was sometimes replaced by Deshpande. Deshpande post was usually held by Deshasthas and also sometimes by Velamas.

== Karanam Telugu ==
Karanam Telugu was a variety of Telugu language patronized by Karanam writers. There was also the Pandit's language which was the language variant used by scholars (Pandits) in literary texts. Both varieties enjoyed similar social status. The language of the Karanams was more suitable for day-to-day affairs. The balance between the two variants was changed when western missionaries started using Pandit's language for printing purposes. Also, instrumental were Paravastu Chinnaya Suri's disciples who monopolised Telugu instructor posts and editor roles at major publishing houses. They preferred Chinnaya Suri's Pandit style, and Karanam Telugu used for writing prose was rejected by them as non-standard. In opposition to this, Gidugu Ramamurthi fought for a language closer to Karanam Telugu (which he called vyavaharika).
