= National Commission for Protection of Child Rights =

Indian government agency in charge of protecting child rights

National Commission for Protection of Child Rights राष्ट्रीय बाल अधिकार संरक्षण आयोग

Agency overview
- Formed: 5 March 2007; 19 years ago

Jurisdictional structure
- Operations jurisdiction: India
- Legal jurisdiction: India
- Governing body: Ministry of Women and Child Development
- Constituting instrument: Commission for the Protection of Child Rights Act, 2005

Operational structure
- Headquarters: New Delhi
- Agency executive: Shri Valeti Premchand, Chairperson

Website
- ncpcr.gov.in

The National Commission for Protection of Child Rights (NCPCR) was constituted by Ministry of Women & Child Development as a statutory body under Section 3 of the Commissions for Protection of Child Rights (CPCR) Act, 2005, to protect, promote and defend child rights in the country. NCPCR is mandated for monitoring of implementation of laws relating to children such as Juvenile Justice (Care and Protection) Act, 2015; Protection of Children from Sexual Offences (POCSO) Act, 2012; and Right of Children to Free and Compulsory Education (RTE) Act, 2009.

== Composition ==
The commission consist of the following members namely:

- A chairperson who is a person of eminence and has done an outstanding job of promoting the welfare of children; and
- Six Members, out of which at least two are women, are appointed by the Central Government from amongst persons of eminence, ability, integrity, standing and experience in the following fields,-
  - Education;
  - Child health, care, welfare or child development;
  - Juvenile justice or care of neglected or marginalized children or children with disabilities;
  - Elimination of child labour or children in distress;
  - Child psychology or sociology;
  - Laws relating to children.

== List of Chairpersons ==
1. Shantha Sinha (2007–2013)
2. Kushal Singh (2013–14)
3. V.S.Oberoi (14.10.2014-10.05.2015)
4. Nutan Guha Biswas (11.05.2015 - 16.09.2015)
5. Stuti Narain Kacker (2015–2018)
6. Rakesh Srivastava (17.09.2018 - 16.10.2018)
7. Priyank Kanoongo (2018–2024)
8. Tripti Gurha (20.01.2025–19.11.2025)
9. Valeti Premchand (03.12.2025–Incumbent)

== Members of the Commission ==
- Vacant: Laws Relating to Children
- Vacant: child health, care, welfare or child development
- Vacant: Child Psychology and Sociology
- Vacant: Education
- Vacant: Juvenile justice or care of neglected or marginalized children or children with disabilities
- Vacant: Elimination of child labour or children in distress

== List of Member Secretaries ==
1. Shalini Prasad (05.4.2007 – 30.04.2008)
2. V.C.Tiwari (13.06.2008 – 31.05.2009)
3. Lov Verma (03.11.2009 - 12.07.2012)
4. Dr. Vivek Joshi (13.07.2012 - 21.10.2012)
5. Asheem Srivastava (22.10.2012 - 14.06.2016)
6. Rashmi Saxena sahni (16.06.2016 - 31.07.2016)
7. Dr. Preeti Srivastava (01.08.2016 – 01.01.2017)
8. Geeta Narayan (02.01.2017 – 03.06.2019)
9. Rupali Banerjee Singh (03.06.2019 – 28.02.2025)
10. Dr. Sanjeev Sharma (25.04.2025 – Incumbent)

== Main recommendations ==
Seminars should be conducted for teachers to improve their teaching styles. The dignity of a student should be accepted by everyone. Drug addiction, copying, violence, etc. should be curtailed. State Commissions for the Protection of Child Rights should be established.

== Lodging Complaint ==
The National Commission for Protection of Child Rights provides multiple online mechanisms for lodging complaints related to violations of child rights.

- POCSO e-Box : For reporting Child Sexual Abuse complaints (POCSO Related)
- e-Baalnidan : For reporting any Child Rights Complaint (Other than POCSO)
- SAHARA : For Reporting Rights Complaint Related to Children of Central Armed Police Forces (CAPF)
- J&K and ladakh : For Reporting Rights Complaint Related to Children Belonging to Jammu and Kashmir and Ladakh

== Portal for Stakeholders ==
- GHAR :

The National Commission for Protection of Child Rights (NCPCR) has developed and launched the GHAR - Go Home and Reunite portal with the sole purpose of restoration and repatriation of children. The GHAR portal has been developed to digitally monitor and track the restoration and repatriation of children.

- Baalswaraj :

Baalswaraj portal is developed for online tracking and real-time monitoring mechanism of children in need of care & protection.The portal has following module:-

i) COVID Care- COVID Care module caters to the Children who lost either or both parents due to COVID-19 pr otherwise post March 2020.

ii) CISS - This module is used for tracking the rescue, care, and rehabilitation of children in street situations.

iii) POCSO Tracking - This module facilitates real-time tracking of cases registered under the Protection of Children from Sexual Offences (POCSO) Act, with the objective of ensuring transparent monitoring, timely rehabilitation, and accountability of stakeholders.

== See also ==
- Constitution of India
- UN Convention on the Rights of the Child
- Odisha State Child Protection Society
