= Haravilāsamu =

- Author: Srinatha
- Original title: హరవిలాసము
- Language: Telugu
- Subject: Saivism
- Publisher: Vavilla Ramaswamy Sastrulu and Sons, Chennai.
- Publication date: 1916, 1931, 1966
- Publication place: India

Haravilāsamu (Telugu: హరవిలాసము) is a poetic composition in Prabandha style written in Telugu language by Srinatha. It is one of the books on Saivism (Hara means Siva).

== Content ==
The Prabandha is divided into seven asvasas. The first and second asvasas described the story of Siriyala, the third and fourthth asvasas about the marriage of Gouri, the fifth asvasa about the tour of Parvati and Paramesvara, the sixth asvasa about the swallowing of Halahala and the seventh asvasa about Kirātārjunīya.

== Publications ==
It has been published by Vavilla Ramaswamy Sastrulu and Sons in 1916 and in 1931. It is reprinted in 1966. Emesco published it in 2013 with foreword by Viswanatha Satyanarayana.

== Other languages ==
Haravilasa has been written in other Indian languages; K. Venkataramappa wrote it in Kannada language.

== Popular culture ==
Haravilāsa is taken as Telugu film in 1941 directed by Kocharlakola Rangarao; the Srinatha role is played by Vemuri Gaggayya.
