= Ramineni Foundation Awards =

Indian film director and screenwriter

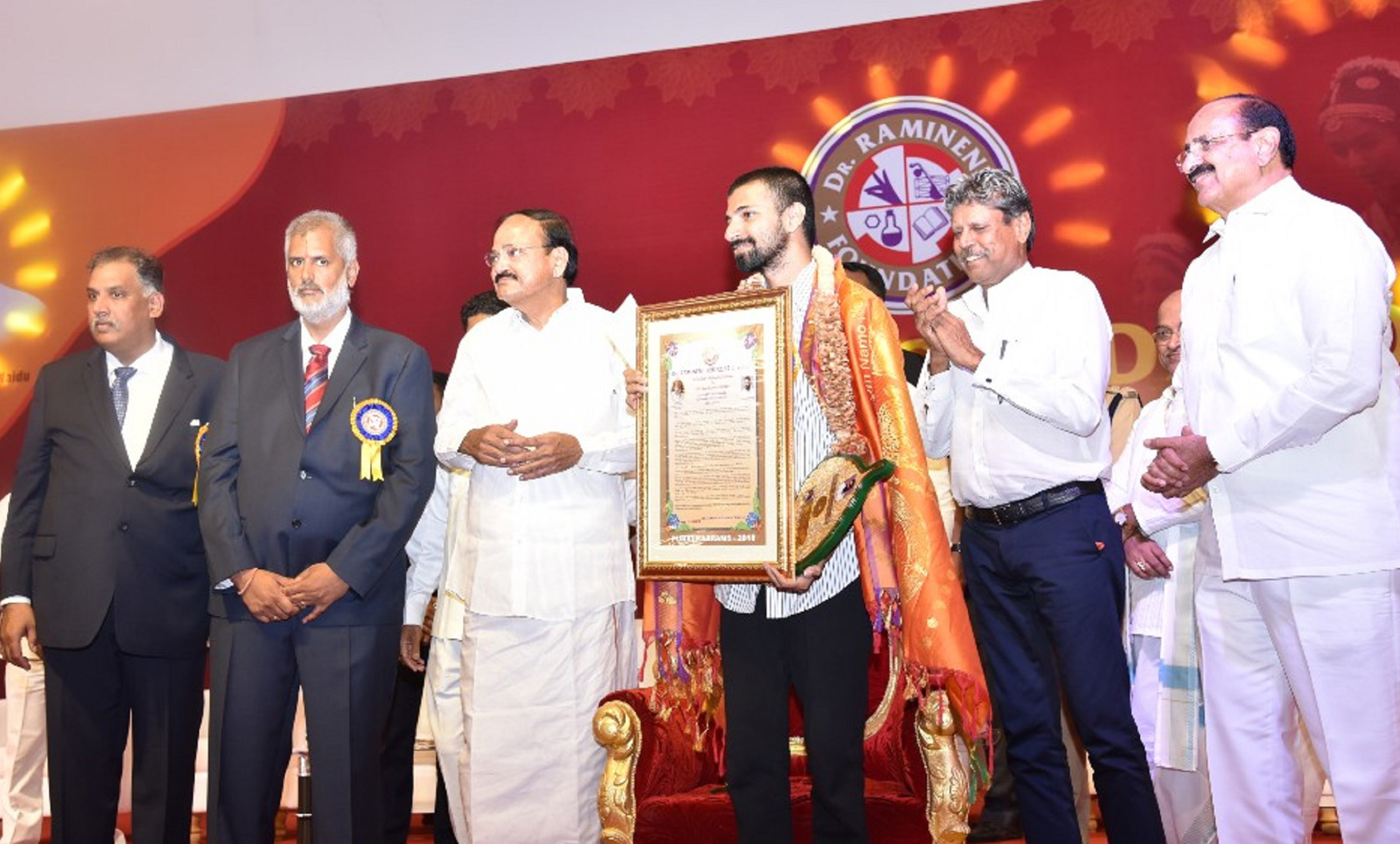
- The Former Vice President, Sri M. Venkaiah Naidu presenting the ‘Ramineni Awards 2018’ to film director, Sri Nag Ashwin Reddy, instituted by Dr. Ramineni Foundation, in Mangalagiri, Andhra Pradesh.

The Ramineni Foundation was founded in 1995 by the children of Ramineni Ayyanna Choudary in Cincinnati, Ohio, United States, for the purpose of protecting and promoting the monumental heritage of Indian culture and the ideals of Hinduism. In addition, the primary mission of the foundation is to facilitate the valiant, relentless and altruistic efforts of all those high priests drawn from a cross-spectrum of fields in arts, science and humanities.

== History ==
Ramineni Ayyanna Choudary, after whom the foundation and the awards were named, was born on 1929-10-12 in Brahmanakoduru, Guntur district, Andhra Pradesh, India to Veeriah Choudary and Kanya Kumari. He completed his school education in Guntur District and obtained a postgraduate degree in mathematics from Banaras Hindu University. Until 1955 he worked as a teacher in Palaparru and Movva. He left for the United States in 1955, and completed his master's degree in economics and finance followed by a doctorate from the University of Minnesota. During this time, he founded the Hindu Association of Minnesota to promote Hindu culture and civilisation and organised Hindu festivals & social activities regularly. He worked as a professor at Northland College in Ashland, Wisconsin, and Xavier University in Cincinnati, Ohio (1963–1973). He took early retirement from his job in order to devote his time to social and cultural activities, and to raise his children. He established Downtown Property Management in Cincinnati, a real estate business now managed by his sons.

He married Suguna in 1967 and gave birth to 6 children – Dharmapracharak, Saradha Devi, Satyavadhi, Brahmananda, Vedacharya and Harischandra.

He established Sangeeth Sahitya Samskrithi Hindu Dharma Nilayam and dedicated it to Indian fine arts. He developed agricultural activities and also established Hindustan Therapeutics at Hyderabad to supply high-quality, cost-effective veterinary medicines and feed supplements to farmers.

On the occasion of his 70th birthday, his children started the Ramineni Foundation in India on 1999-10-12.

Choudary died on 2000-04-24 in Cincinnati Ohio.

== Awards ==
=== 1999 ===
Ramineni Foundation was inaugurated in India on 1999-10-12 at Hyderabad. The occasion was attended by C. Narayana Reddy as Chief Guest and Vempati China Satyam, N. Gopi, P. Siva Reddy and Gummadi as esteemed guests.

==== Visishta Puraskaram ====
- G. N. Rao – Director, L V Prasad Eye Institute

==== Viseesha Puraskaram ====
- Bapu
- Ramana
- Nanduri Rama Mohana Rao – Veteran journalist and Writer
- Kalipatnam Rama Rao – Custodian of Telugu Story, founder of Kathanilaya

=== 2000 ===
This function was attended by Akkineni Nageswara Rao as Chief Guest and D. N. Siva Prasad, Prof. Kakarla Subba Rao, M. Murali Mohan as esteemed Guests.

==== Visishta Puraskaram ====
- K. Varaprasad Reddy – MD Shantha Biotechnics

==== Viseesha Puraskaram ====
- Lalji Singh – Director, CCMB
- K. Viswanath – Cine Director
- Kaloji Narayana Rao – Veteran Writer
- Gudapati Srinivasa Rao - DGM BSNL

=== 2001 ===
The function was attended by U. Krishnam Raju, Union Minister of Defence as Chief Guest and Justice Jasti Chelameshwar, A. Gangadhara Rao, Former Chief Justice of High court of Andhra Pradesh, P V R K prasad IAS, and M. V. Bhasakara Rao as Esteemed Guests.

==== Visishta Puraskaram ====
- Chinchode Devender Reddi- Vice-Chancellor, Osmania University

==== Viseesha Puraskaram ====
- Volga – Popular Writer
- M. A. Subhan – Founder, Kalasaagar
- Nirmalamma – Veteran Artist

=== 2002 ===
The function was attended by K. Prathibha Bharathi, Speaker of Andhra Pradesh Legislative Assembly as Chief Guest and T Devendra Goud, Home Minister, Government of Andhra Pradesh, Kodela Siva Prasada Rao, Minister for Health, Government of Andhra Pradesh, I. Venkata Rao, chairman, Press Academy of Andhra Pradesh, and Madugula Nagaphani Sharma as Esteemed Guests.

==== Visishta Puraskaram ====
- Shantha Sinha, Secretary -Trustee M. V. Foundation

==== Viseesha Puraskaram ====
- Dr. Chukka Ramaiah (IIT)
- N. Koteswara Rao – Popular Writer
- Syed MD. Arif – National Chief Badminton Coach

=== 2003 ===
The function was attended by Mullapudi Harishchandra Prasad as Chief Guest and Somireddy Chandra mohan Reddy, Minister of Information & Public Relations, Government of Andhra Pradesh, Dr. Mohan Kanda, Chief Secretary of Government of Andhra Pradesh, Prevaram Ramulu, chairman, APPSC, and Rajasekhar, film actor as Esteemed Guests.

==== Visishta Puraskaram ====
- K. Anji Reddy – chairman, Reddy Labs

==== Viseesha Puraskaram ====
- C. Raghavachari
- Rao Balasaraswathi Devi – Popular Singer
- C. V. Krishna Rao – Social Worker and Writer

=== 2004 ===
The function was attended by Avadhoota Datta Peethadhipathi Sri Ganapathi satchtananda Swamiji and Nara Chandra Babu Naidu, Former Chief Minister of Andhra Pradesh as Chief Guests and V S Rama Devi, Former Governor of Karnataka, Pathuri Nagabhushanam, Chairman Zilla Parishad, Guntur as esteemed guests.

==== Visishta Puraskaram ====
- Yarlagadda Nayudamma, Pediatric Surgeon, Guntur

==== Viseesha Puraskaram ====
- Tadepalli Lakshmi Kanta Rao – Veteran Artist
- Buddiga Subbarayan – Popular Writer
- Hemalatha Lavanam – Secretary – SAMSKAR

=== 2005 ===
The function was attended by Tridandi China Jeeyar Swamiji and Dasari Narayana Rao, Union Minister for Coal & Mines, Government of India, as Chief Guests and K. R. Suresh Reddy, Speaker Of Andhra Pradesh State Legislative Assembly, and A. K. Khan, Additional Commissioner of Police as Esteemed Guests.

==== Visishta Puraskaram ====
- D.Nageswar Reddy – Gastroenterologist, Director, Asian Institute of Gastroenterology

==== Viseesha Puraskaram ====
- Boyi Bhimanna – Veteran Writer
- K. Sugunamani – Andhra Mahila Sabha
- Navodaya Rama Mohana Rao – Navodaya Publishers, Vijayawada

=== 2006 ===
The function was attended by Konijeti Rossaiah, Minister for Finance, Medical and Health, Government Of Andhra Pradesh, Avula Manjulatha Vice Chancellor of Potti Sriramulu Telugu University, and C. C. Reddy, Adviser, Government of Andhra Pradesh, as Esteemed Guests, Jury Members, B. V. Pattabhiram, G. N. Rao, Paruchuri Gopala Krishna, A V S.

==== Visishta Puraskaram ====
- Padam Bhushan K. Srinath Reddy, Professor and Head of the Dept of Cardiology, AIIMS

==== Viseesha Puraskaram ====
- Umar Alisha – Philanthropist, Chairman Umar Alisha Rural Development Trust, Pithapuram
- I. V. Chalapathi Rao, Eminent Academician
- Smt Anjali Devi – Veteran Artist

=== 2007 ===
The function was attended by Narayan Dutt Tiwari, Governor of Andhra Pradesh, as Chief Guest and N. Rajyalakshmi, Minister For Women Development, Government of Andhra Pradesh, G. Aruna Kumari, Minister for Medical Education, Government Of Andhra Pradesh and M. Venkataramana Rao, Minister for Infrastructure, Investment, Government Of Andhra Pradesh and jury members G.N. Rao, director, L.V. Prasad Eye Institute, K. Ramachandramurthy, Editor, Andhra Jyothi, and magician B.V. Pattabhiram have participated at the occasion.

==== Visishta Puraskaram ====
- P. Ramachandra Rao, Director of Defence Institute of Advanced Technology

==== Viseesha Puraskaram ====
- Nerella Venu Madhav – Cine Artist
- P. Susheela – Playback singer
- Reddi Raghavaiah – author of children's literature

==== Viseesha Puraskaram ====
- Dr.Garikapati Narasimha Rao (literary performer)
- Nag Ashwin(Art - Cinema - Best Director)
