= Vavilla Ramaswamy Sastrulu and Sons =

- Founded: 1854
- Founder: Vavilla Ramaswamy Sastrulu
- Successor: Vavilla Venkateswara Sastrulu
- Country of origin: India
- Headquarters location: 26; Ramanuja Ayyer Veedhi, Chennai-600021, Tamil Nadu
- Distribution: worldwide
- Nonfiction topics: Hinduism, Sanatana Dharma
- Official website: www.vavillapress.org

Vavilla Ramaswamy Sastrulu and Sons (Telugu: వావిళ్ల రామస్వామి శాస్త్రులు అండ్ సన్స్) is a 150-year-old Indian publishing house.

It was started by Vavilla Ramaswamy Sastrulu in 1854 in Chennai in a press named Hindu Bhasha Sanjeevini. Later he established Adi Saraswathi Nilayam. During his lifetime, he published about 50 important books in Telugu and Sanskrit.

His well-educated son Vavilla Venkateswara Sastrulu led the house in 1906 and actively continued the tradition and improved it greatly. He named it "Vavilla Press". It was associated with Gita Press of Gorakhpur and Choukhamba Press of Varanasi. He published books with perfect proofreading by the experts in the field and successfully printed in Royal, Demy and Crown sizes. He was the first to get his books bound with calico cover and glittering letters.

Vavilla Press published mostly classic literature, epics, Puranas, and commentaries. They published Sanskrit text in Telugu script so that any Telugu reader person can read the ancient Sanskrit texts and study them. During his lifetime more than 900 books in Telugu, Sanskrit, Tamil and English languages were published.

== Publications ==
This is partial list of some important publications:

- Anandamatha by Bankim Chandra Chatterji (1907)
- Narasabhoopaaleeyam by Puranam Suryanaraya Sastrulu (1909)
- Vaijayanti Vilasamu (1909)
- Radhika Santwanamu by Muddu Palani (1910)
- Kavi Jeevitamulu by Gurajada Sriramamurti (1913)
- Vikramarka Charitramu by Jakkana (1913)
- Srimath Andhra Maha Bhagavatham by Bammera Pothana (edited by Rayadurgam Narasayya Sastrulu) (1915)
- Bhadradri Rama Satakamu by Pavuluri Mallana (1916)
- Bhaskara Ramayana (1923)
- Ramarajiyamu or Narapativijayamu (1923)
- Bhakthi Rasa Shatakha Samputam (1926)
- Soundarya Tilaka by Chilakamarti Lakshminarasimham (1926)
- Andhra Vangmya Caritra Sangrahamu by K. Venkatanarayana Ravu (1928)
- Kavitraya Kavitā Vimarśanamu by Gur̲r̲amu Vēṅkaṭasubbarāmayya (1933)
- Vēdamu Vēṅkaṭarāyaśāstri Saṃskr̥ti by Gur̲r̲amu Vēṅkaṭasubbarāmayya (1938)
- Vruddha Paarasharyamu by Parasharam (1940)
- Barthruhari Subhashitamu by T. Benarji (1949)
- Andhra Vyakaranamu by Vedam Pattabhiram Sastry (1951)
- Sreemadandra Bhagavathamu by Bhammera Potha Raju (1952)
- Sri Gopala Sahasranama stotramu (1955)
- English-Telugu Dictionary by P. Shankaranarayana (1964)
- Sri Mahabhakta Vijayamu by Sripada Subramanya Sastri (1966)
- Atukuri Molla Ramayan (1968)
- Kshetraya Padamulu by Muvva Goopaala
- Sri Lakshmee Stotra Ratnatrayamu (1999)
- Bruhatstotra Ratnakaramu (2005)
- Muhuurta Darpand-amu (2005)
- Lalita sahasranama stotramu
- Haravilasa
- Śukasaptati (1951)
- Parijatapaharanamu (1933 and 1960)
- Kasikhandamu (1914 and 1917)
