= Chaganti Vari Palem =

- Village
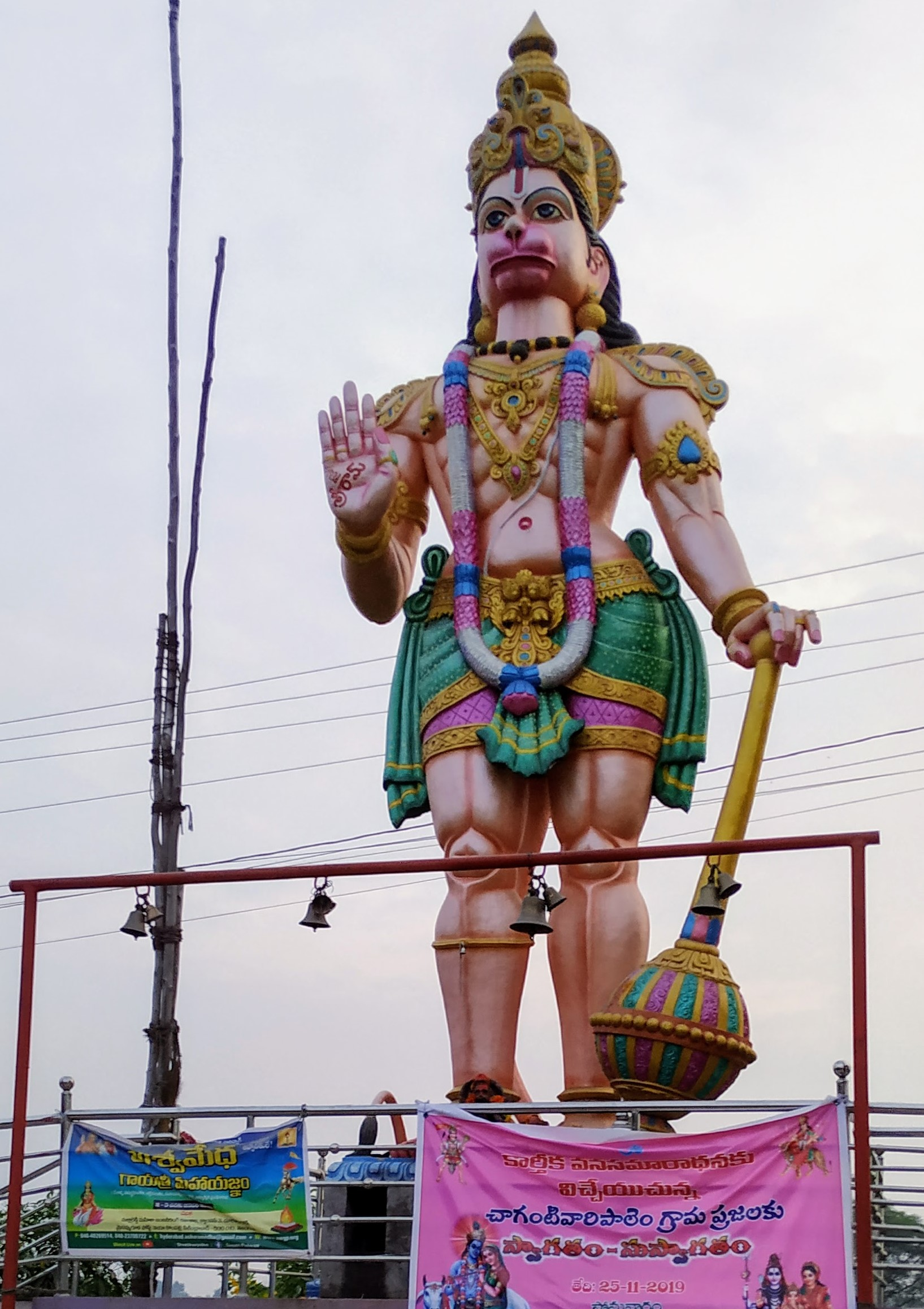
- Interactive map of Chaganti Vari Palem
- Location in Andhra Pradesh, India
- Coordinates: 16°19′24.41″N 80°5′56.38″E
- Country: India
- State: Andhra Pradesh
- District: Palnadu

Population (2011)
  - Total: 5,000

Languages
  - Official: Telugu
- Time zone: UTC+5:30 (IST)
- PIN: 522408
- Telephone code: +91-8641
- Vehicle registration: AP-07
- Nearest city: Guntur
- Lok Sabha constituency: Narasaraopet
- Vidhan Sabha constituency: Sattenapalli
- Website: www.chagantivaripalem.com

Chaganti Vari Palem is a village having a population of around 5,000 people and is situated (16.323447°N 80.098994°E) around 10 km away from Narasaraopet of Palnadu district, of southern state Andhra Pradesh of India.

== Transport ==
Chaganti Vari Palem is situated at the midway of Narasaraopet and Sattenapalli at a distance of 10 km away from both of them.

== Railway station ==
Though Narasaraopet also has a railway station, Sattenapalli is the preferable railway station as there are several trains through Sattenapalli to reach most of South India (Hyderabad, Visakhapatnam, Chennai, Tirupathi, Cochi, Trivandrum) and few places like Bhubaneswar, Mumbai, Surat etc.

== Airport ==
Vijayawada Airport at Gannavaram.

== Temples in village ==
1. Lingamayya Swamy Temple

2. Sai Baba Temple

3. Brahmam gari Matham

4. Sri Jagannadha Swamy Devasthanam

== Notable people ==
- Brahmanandam
