= Avadhanum Paupiah =

Indian British East India Company interpreter

Avadhanum (or Avadhanam) Paupiah was a dubash, or interpreter in the service of the British East India Company. He was of Telugu origin.

Avadhanum Paupiah joined the service of the British East India Company factory at Madras as a clerk and rose to become dubash to the Holland brothers, who served as Governors of Madras. Paupiah and the Hollands were guilty of trying to "dispose" David Haliburton, an important official and rival of the Hollands. While the Hollands managed to escape to the United Kingdom, Paupiah was convicted and fined. The trial was the subject of a book and the Scottish writer Sir Walter Scott, a relative of Haliburton, makes a reference to the episode in his book The Surgeon's Daughter (1827).

== Early life ==
Avadhanam Paupiah was born into a Tummagunta Dravida Brahmin family in Nellore, which was then in the princely state of Carnatic. Paupiah had little formal education; however, he was well-versed in his native Telugu. Apart from this, he could also converse in Persian, which was the court language of the princely state and learnt English.

== Service with the British East India Company and rise to power ==
Paupiah joined the service of the British East India Company at an early age. He worked as a "writer" (clerk who writes or copies documents and papers) in the Sea Customs Department of the British East India Company factory at Madras for sometime and was in charge of keeping the accounts of the Company.

== Dubash to the Holland brothers ==
Soon, Paupiah became the chief dubash to the Holland brothers, John Holland and Edward J. Holland. The Holland brothers were powerful and influential officers in the Madras establishment. As dubash, Paupiah exerted as much influence over the Holland brothers.

The Holland brothers were extremely corrupt and when both of them were elected to the assembly, Paupiah assisted them in the unlawful ways by which they made money. John Holland reached the pinnacle of his career in 1789 when he was appointed Governor of Madras.

John served as governor from 7 February 1789 to 13 February 1790 and was succeeded by his brother Edward who served just one week. The two brothers amassed a lot of wealth during their terms as governor. During this time, Paupiah became the most influential Indian in the Presidency; even the Nawab of Arcot had to pass through him to approach the governor.

== The Haliburton affair ==
Edward and John Holland found their nemesis in David Haliburton, a member of the Board of Revenue who wished to expose their corrupt practices. Soon, the Hollands grew wary of him and his persistent campaign against them and desired to get rid of him through Paupiah. Paupiah forged evidence against Haliburton and thus brought an end to his period of service in India.

However, the scheme was exposed by Lord Cornwallis, the Governor-General of India who unravelled the corrupt practices of the Hollands. The Hollands managed to escape and sail to England, but Paupiah was convicted along with three other Indians.

Paupiah was tried between 11 and 13 July 1792 for conspiracy against David Haliburton in the Court of Quarter Sessions presided over by Charles Medows. He was pronounced guilty and sentenced to three years imprisonment and to pay a fine of 2,000 pagodas or one thousand rupees. Avadhanum Paupiah's trial was one of the most famous criminal prosecutions of the time.

Paupiah's trial was the subject of a 1793 book of the same name by David Haliburton, which was co-written by the Scottish writer Sir Walter Scott, who was a close relative of Haliburton. Scott also makes allusions to Avadhanum Paupiah in his novel The Surgeon's Daughter:

The artful Hindu, master counsellor of dark projects, an Oriental Machiavelli, whose premature wrinkles were the result of many intrigues, without scruples, to attain political or private advantage
