= Bhimeswara Puranam =

15th century Telugu epic poem by Srinatha

Bhimeswara Puranamu
- 1901 printed edition.
- Author: Srinatha
- Original title: భీమేశ్వర పురాణము
- Language: Telugu
- Subject: Sthala Purana
- Published: 15th century
- Publisher: Kottapalli Venkata Padmanabha Sastry, Madras
- Publication date: 1901, 1929
- Publication place: India
- Pages: 136

Bhimeswara Puranam, also known as Bhima Khandam, is a 15th-century Telugu epic poem (prabandham) composed by the poet Srinatha. It is a sthala purāṇa, a type of local lore, that focuses on the Bhimeswara deity of Draksharamam and the sacred region of Bhima Mandala, located in present-day Andhra Pradesh.

The work blends local traditions with broader religious narratives, drawing from Sanskrit puranas while maintaining a distinct identity in Telugu literature. It offers detailed descriptions of pilgrimage sites, particularly the Bhimeswara temple, and highlights the religious and cultural landscape of Andhra. The text also provides insights into the environmental and social conditions of the time.

In addition to its religious content, the Bhimeswara Puranam serves as an important historical and cultural document, reflecting the geography, culture, and social conditions of the Andhra region during Srinatha’s time. The work traces the journey of Vyasa and describes various temples in the Prolunadu region.

The text was first printed in 1901 and reprinted in 1929.

== Composition and Structure ==
Bhimeswara Puranamu is divided into several chapters, each exploring different aspects of the Bhimeswara deity of Draksharamam, the pilgrimage to his temple, and the religious significance of the region. While it draws from Sanskrit texts and purāṇas, Srinatha’s version is an independent work in Telugu literature. It integrates elements of local lore with broader religious narratives, making it a significant contribution to both regional and pan-Indian spiritual traditions.

The text is structured as follows:

- First Chapter: The introduction to the Bhimeswara deity and the region, along with a description of the temple and its surroundings.
- Second Chapter: Description of pilgrimage sites, Vyāsa's curse, and connections to other holy sites in the region.
- Third Chapter: Vyasa’s encounter with sage Agastya and the revelation of Bhimeswara’s greatness.
- Fourth Chapter: Further depictions of Siva’s divine activities and the greatness of Bhimeswara as a self-manifested deity.
- Fifth Chapter: The consecration of Bhimeswara and the significance of land donations, concluding with the divine union of Bhimeswara and Parvati.

== Regional significance ==
The Bhimeswara Purāṇa is significant in the cultural and geographical context of Andhra Pradesh, offering detailed descriptions of regions such as Rajamahendravaram, Palnadu, and Draksharamam. It provides insights into the environmental and social conditions of the time, including a critique of the lack of basic amenities like clean water and food, particularly in Palnadu. The work also highlights the challenges faced by priests and devotees in these areas.

The text is particularly important for its depiction of the Bhimeswara temple in the Draksharama region, where it emphasizes the sacredness of Bhima Mandala and the consecration of the temple. The Bhimeswara Puranam underscores the religious and cultural significance of the region, focusing on the role of the temple and its pilgrimage sites in the religious life of Andhra Pradesh.

== Cultural Context ==
As an essential part of Telugu literature, the Bhimeswara Puranam integrates regional deities and local stories into broader cultural and religious narratives. It highlights the intersection of local traditions with pan-Indian religious mythologies, reflecting the diversity of South India and the importance of local religious sites. Srinatha’s work is a key example of how regional folklore and traditions shape literary works and contribute to the wider mythological discourse.
