= Kasi Khandamu =

15th century Telugu literary work by Srinatha

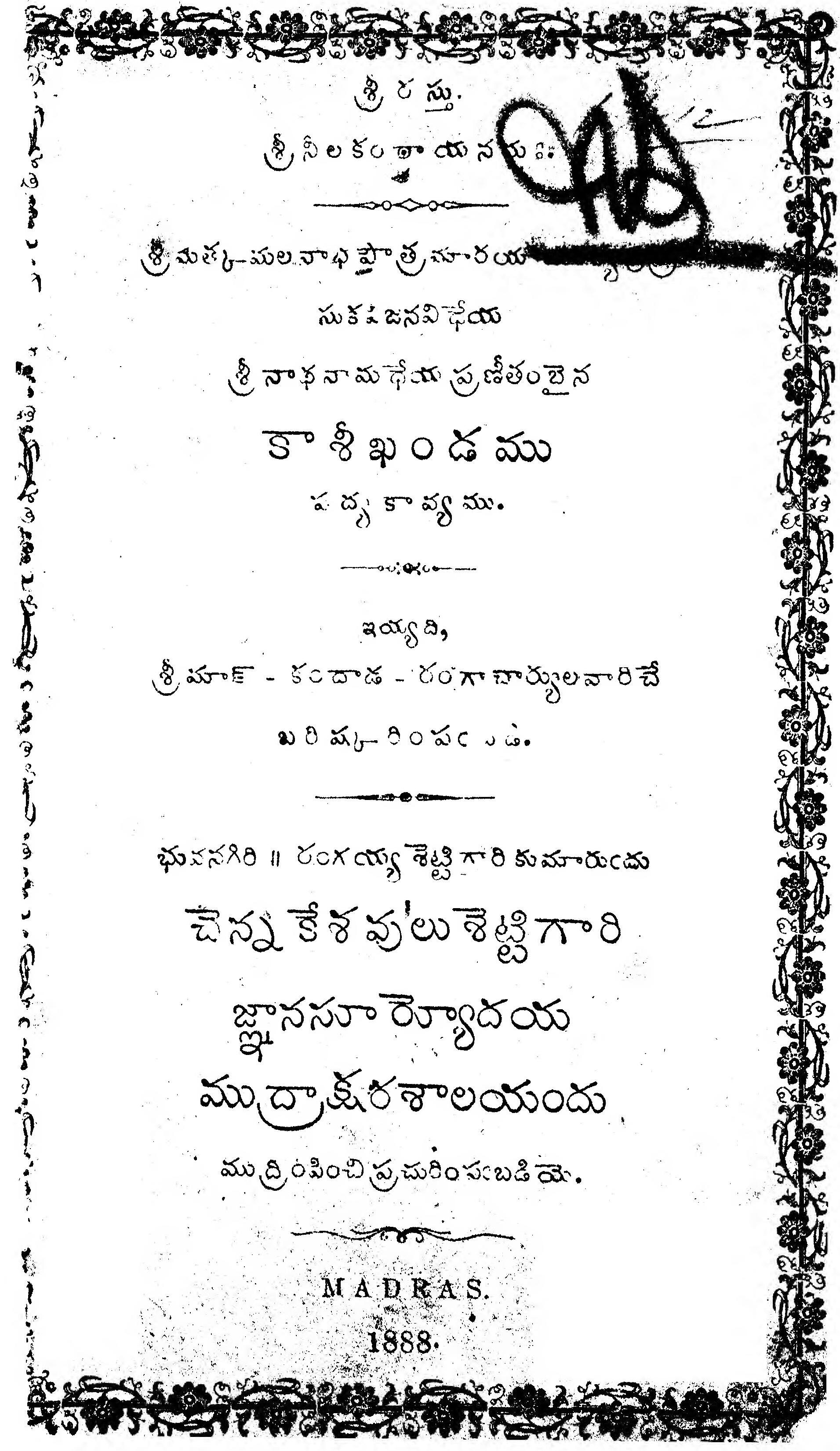
- 1888 edition cover
- Author: Srinatha
- Original title: కాశీఖండము
- Language: Telugu
- Genre: Prabandha
- Publication date: 15th century
- Publication place: India

Kasi Khandamu (Telugu: కాశీఖండము, romanized: Kāśī Khanḍamu) is a Telugu literary work by 15th century poet Srinatha. It is composed in a poetic form of Prabandha style with strict metre. The main subject is the profile of Kasi or Varanasi, extracted mostly from Kasi Khanda of Skanda Purana.

According to the researcher Nidudavolu Venkata Rao, the author most probably wrote this work in 1440 CE and dedicated his work to Sri Veerabhadra Reddy (1423–1448) of Reddi kingdom, under whom he was the court-poet. Srinatha was the first poet to take up this translation into Telugu language. Subsequent to him, two other poets Kancherla Sarabhakavi and Mocherla Annaya translated Kasi Khanda in 1500 and 1650 respectively.

== Summary ==
Kasi Khandam narrates the dialogue between the sage Sootudu and the sages Sounaka regarding the significance of Kasi. The Vindhya mountain requests Narada to explain the distinction between itself and Meru. However, Narada mistakenly believes that Meru has also expressed a similar thought. As a result of the Vindhya mountain's upheaval, the three worlds face great danger. In response, the gods beseech Agastya, a resident of Kasi, for assistance, following the guidance of Brahma.

In deep contemplation about the separation from Kasi, Agastya travels southward and performs a penance to appease the Vindhya mountain. He visits the Draksharama temple and obeys the commands of Sri Mahalakshmi in Kollapur. Agastya narrates the significance of Kasi as a place of liberation for Lopamudra. According to the account given to Parvati by Visveswara, he explains the greatness of the Kasi Kshetra to Agastya.

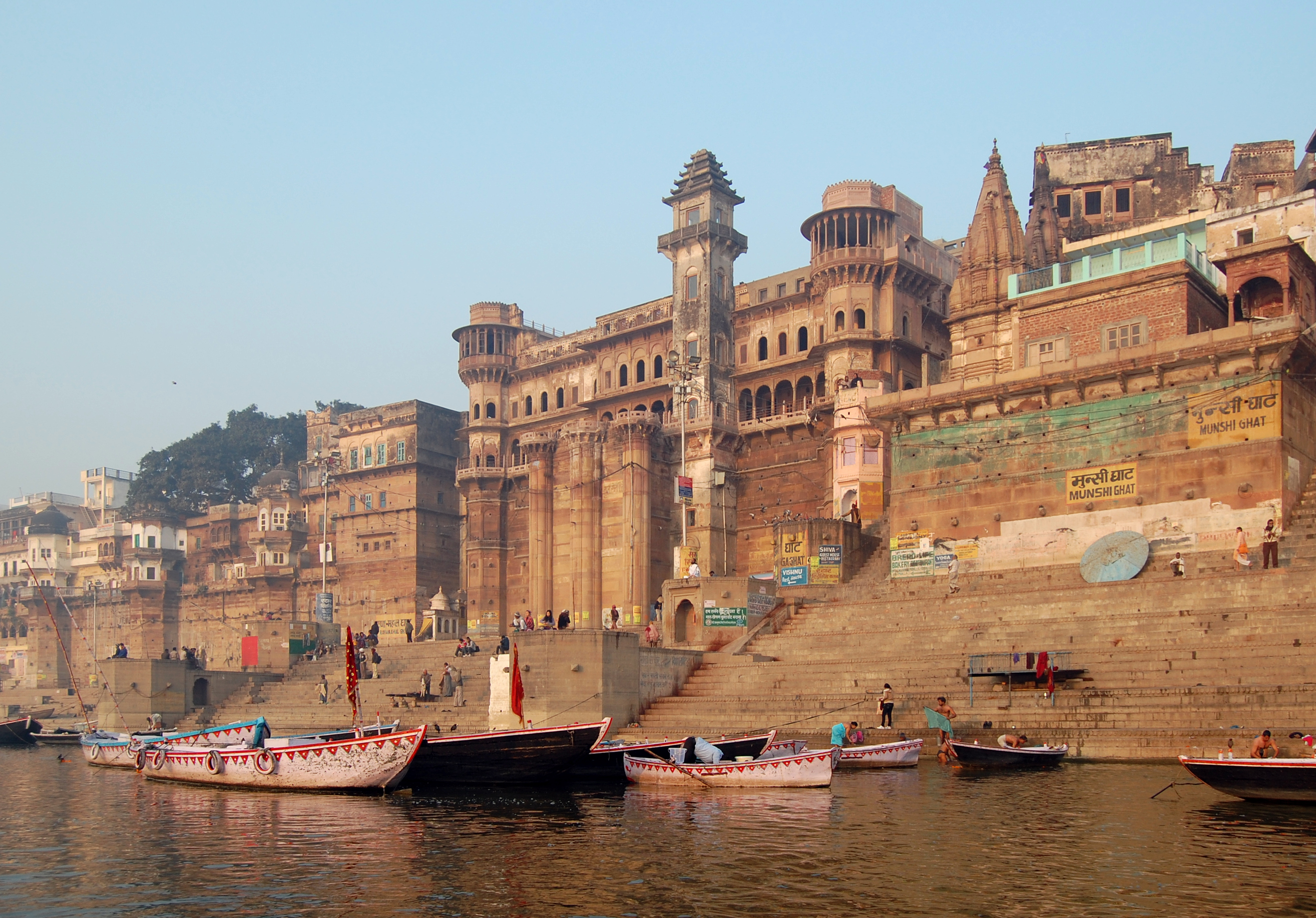
Kasi at Munshi Ghat.

The text elaborates on the etymology of Varanasi, the arrival of the nature-purusha forms known as Ardhanarisvara in Kasi, the sanctity of various holy waters such as the Tirtha Vapika and Kundika rivers, and the significance of the Linga. It describes the importance of the Shiva Tirtha, with the story of Susila highlighted in the Kalavatyu narrative.

To alleviate Brahma's drought, a grand coronation of the divine servant Divodasa is performed, along with his subsequent downfall due to his actions. The narrative also describes Divodasa’s attainment of liberation through the bond of life, the trials faced by the sage Vyasa who could not withstand the test from Visveswara, the curse he casts upon Kasi, and the eventual withdrawal of Visveswara into his inner essence.

Furthermore, the text details the procedures for the divine pilgrimage and the significance of these sacred rites.

== Publications ==
The book was published in 1888 in Madras by Gnana Suryodaya Printing press of Chennakesavulu Shetti. Subsequently Vavilla Ramaswamy Sastrulu and Sons, Madras published it in 1917 with foreword by Nidudavolu Venkata Rao.
