= Sarpavaram =

- Urban
- Interactive map of Sarpavaram
- Location in Andhra Pradesh, India Sarpavaram (India)
- Coordinates: 17.010171°N 82.225006°E
- Country: India
- State: Andhra Pradesh
- District: Kakinada
- Mandal: Kakinada mandal

Population
  - Total: 30,000 approx

Languages
  - Official: Telugu
- Time zone: UTC+5:30 (IST)
- PIN: 533005

Sarpavaram is a commercial area of Kakinada city in Kakinada district of Andhra Pradesh State.
