= Mamidipudi Anandam =

Indian politician

Member of Parliament, Rajya Sabha
- In office 1969-1980
- Constituency: Andhra Pradesh

Personal details
- Born: 13 May 1919 Madras, Madras Presidency, British India
- Died: 2001
- Party: Indian National Congress

Mamidipudi Anandam was an Indian politician. He was a Member of Parliament representing Andhra Pradesh in the Rajya Sabha the upper house of India's Parliament as member of the Indian National Congress.
