= Telugu Hindu wedding =

Traditional wedding ceremony in India

The Telugu Hindu wedding ceremony (Telugu: తెలుగు వివాహ వేడుక, Telugu Vivāha Vēḍuka) is the traditional wedding ceremony of the Telugu people in India. In the 19th century, the ceremony could last up to sixteen days (Padahaaru Rojula Panduga). In modern times, it can last two or more days, depending on the family's financial and social status. The pelli or wedding is considered the strongest of social bonds, and is said to spiritually merge two souls opening the doors to gruhastaashramam (household life).

Telugu marriage is sanctified by seven pledges made by the bride and groom and begins when the bride and groom have completed seven revolutions around a sacred fire. Symbolic gestures and rituals surround the ceremony and ensure that the bride and groom are united in the presence of panchabhutaalu —five essential elements for life, namely: bhumi (earth), akaasham (sky), agni (fire), neeru (water) and vaayuvu (air). The ceremony is held under a Kaḷyāṇa Maṇḍapaṃ or wedding pavilion decorated with fresh flowers. The Nādasvaram (also called the Shehnai in North India) is an Indian musical instrument that traditionally accompanies most Telugu weddings.

Each element in the ceremony is connected and is given special importance. Historically, the groom would ride an elephant to the bride's home where the wedding is supposed to take place. This practice is called Gajaarohana. Today this tradition is declining. Some marriage ceremonies are held in a temple in the presence of god, but most are conducted outside because of the number of people in attendance. After every ceremony, they serve food to all the guests, which is also the main part of the culture of offering food to anyone who comes on an auspicious day. It is also a tradition to eat ice cream or sweets after dinner because it is considered auspicious. All the rituals conducted throughout the Telugu wedding ceremony hold religious significance.

The decorations mostly consist of rich colourful flowers and mango leaves. Families renovate their houses and invite all the guests going to each of their houses by the use of kumkuma (colourful, decorative powder).

== Pre-wedding customs ==
The rich and varied cultural heritage of Telugu speaking people is reflected in the ceremonies conducted there. Almost all festivals are celebrated with religious observances, holding supreme importance in their lives.

Pelli Choopulu (పెళ్ళి చూపులు)
This is the beginning of the marriage process. Traditionally, the parents and grandparents of the Indian Hindu bride search for a suitable alliance from their own community. On finding a prospective groom, the bride's parents invite the groom and his parents for an initial face-to-face interaction. This match-making is known as Pelli Choopulu. When everything looks suitable, like matching horoscope of the bride and groom and mutual liking of the bride and groom, and other consents, both the parties mutually decide and fix a date for Nischitartham or Nischaya Tambulaalu.

Niśchitārtham (నిశ్చితార్థం)
Niśchitārtham means "engagement". The two families meet to perform rituals to make the engagement official. A muhūrtaṃ (auspicious date & time) for the wedding is decided based on their horoscopes. The Telugu people generally avoid the months or a time period where Aashaadham, Bhadrapadam and Shunya maasam occurs, because they are considered inauspicious for the ceremonies. The couple are then blessed by elders of both families, and are given gifts including jewelry and clothing by their new family. During this ceremony, the bride's future mother-in-law presents her with clothes, gold and also silverware.

Pelli Koduku/Kuthuru and Kurallu (పెళ్లి కొడుకు/కూతురు)
In this ceremony, all the relatives and well-wishers gather at the bride and groom's respective houses and they smear Nalugu- a mixture of turmeric, flour and oils, as per the muhurtham (auspicious time) on the bride/ groom. This is done to cleanse their skin, so that it radiates a natural glow after they bathe. After this the bride/ groom and their Thodi Pellikuthuru/ Thodi Pellikoduku take Mangala Snanam (holy shower) followed by Hārati. Henceforth, the bride is told not to go out of town until the actual wedding ceremony.

== Wedding customs ==
The rituals conducted by the Telugu speaking people during the ceremonious occasion of the wedding are different from those conducted in neighboring southern states of India. In Andhra Pradesh, the Telugu people follow their own traditions while conducting a wedding. The bride's maternal uncle and her brother play a prominent role at the time of her marriage. Unlike other South Indian weddings, the muhūrtaṃ in Telugu weddings do not take place in the morning, but close to midnight. Telugu Brahmins' wedding customs differ from the wedding customs of the other Telugu communities. In addition to the rituals mentioned below, their weddings start with rituals common in South Indian Brahmin weddings like Punyahavachanam, Niśchitārtham, Matrukapujanam, etc.

Maṅgala Snānaṃ (మఙ్గళస్నానం)
The wedding day starts with Maṅgaḷa Snānaṃ custom, where the bride and groom are required to take an auspicious bath. The aim is to purify them and make them prepared to perform sacred rites. This bath is called Abhyangana Snānam. They are given a new set of clothing to wear and are blessed that everything goes by well in the preparation ahead.

Mangala Aarti or Hārati (హారతి)
After Mangala Snanam, the family members perform Aarti. They pray for the bride and groom to be granted the wisdom to lead their lives happily.

Snātakaṃ (స్నాతకం)
Snātakaṃ means "graduation" or "Post graduation". It is usually performed before householder responsibilities are handed over to the groom. Snātakaṃ ritual takes place at the bridegroom’s residence a few hours before the wedding muhūrtaṃ. As a part of this custom, the groom is asked to wear a silver thread on his body.

Gauri Pūja (గౌరీ పూజ)
Before the wedding ceremony, the bride performs the Gowri pooja, conducted at her house with all her family members and relatives. It is during this time that Pravara a ritual of changing the bride's gotram (clan) from her paternal gotram to that of the groom, is performed. Elderly couples from both families are required to attend and witness the Pravara while the bride is performing Gauri Pūja.

Groom Entry- Edurukolu and Kāśī Yātra (కాశీ యాత్ర)
On the arrival of groom and his family to the wedding venue, the bride's parents and family receive and welcome them with a spectacular gaiety amidst traditional music of Nadaswaram. This ritual is called Edurukolu.
Traditionally, after Snātakaṃ, the groom is eligible for higher studies and eligible to go to Kashi and study further or become a Sanyasi. However, as a pre-wedding ceremony, the groom pretends to go to Kashi and says that he has discarded the worldly pleasures (such as marriage, relations and properties) and is no longer interested in leading a family life. He is then stopped by the brother (or cousin) of the bride, who persuades him to assume the responsibility of a household or Grihastha and return to the mandapam for marriage.

Ganēśa Puja (గణేశ పూజ)
The wedding ceremony begins with the groom performing the Ganesha pooja, at the maṇḍapaṃ. These rituals are to ward off any evil and obstacles henceforth and to receive blessings for the bride & groom union.

Bride's Entry and Terasala
The maternal uncle and aunt, escort the bride to the mandap either in a Pallaku or walk with an intricately decorated canopy, while the priest recites the holy mantras in the background. They sit across each other with a partition Terasala made by a curtain being placed between the bride and the groom (to prevent them from looking at each other at that time).

Kanyādānaṃ (కన్యాదానం)
Kanyādānaṃ is the ceremony in which the girl's family hands over their daughter's responsibility to the groom. During the ceremony, the bride's parents wash the groom's feet, as the bridegroom is considered a personification of "Lord Vishnu" who has come to marry their daughter, who is considered as "Devi Lakshmi". This is the most noble act a father can perform.

Paṇigrahaṇaṃ (పాణిగ్రహణం)
This means "holding hands". The groom holds the hand of the bride. The groom is made to chant Dharmēca, Arthēca, Kamēcha, Mokshēca Nāti Carāmi three times and assure the bride's father three times that he will remain her companion in joy and sorrow forever. It translates to "Righteously, financially, by desire, spiritually, I will not walk away from her".

Jīlakarra Bellaṃ (జీలకర్రాబెల్లం)
The priest recites the ślokaṃs from the Vedas. Then the couple are asked to place a paste made from cumin seeds and jaggery on each other’s head. This custom is referred to as Jīlakarra-Bellamu. This ceremony is observed to communicate that the married couple's relationship is unbreakable and they are inseparable. This takes place at the actual muhūrtaṃ, and the couple officially become united as husband and wife, as the curtain between them is removed. The ritual (Pravara) of changing bride's gotram is once again performed on the marriage dais, in the presence of the groom and everyone attending the ceremony. The elders bless the couple with Akshintalu while the younger ones congratulate them.

Madhuparakaṃ and Sumangaḷi (మధుపర్కం, సుమంగళి)
As a part of Madhuparakaṃ ritual, the bride dresses up in a white sari with a red border. The groom wears a white dhoti with a red border. White symbolizes purity and red represents strength.
Ten married women (Sumangaḷi) accompany the bride. Six of them hold plates containing sacred rice (a mixture of rice and turmeric powder), while the rest four hold small lit-lamps on their respective plates. Rice represents abundance, while the lit-lamps symbolize light.
The bride and groom return to the mandapam and now sit beside each other with the groom sitting on bride's right, to perform the next set of rituals.

Maṅgaḷasūtra Dhāraṇa (మంగళసూత్రం)
Maṅgaḷasūtra Dhāraṇa means tying Maṅgaḷasūtraṃ (holy thread). The groom ties the string Maṅgaḷasūtraṃ, with two golden discs Sutrams (one from her family and the other spouse's), around the bride's neck, in three knots. The three knots signify the grooms acceptance of the bride in Thoughts (Manasa), Speech (Vacha) and Actions (Karmana). The ritual signifies the complete union of the couple- physically, mentally and spiritually.

Akshintalu or Talambralu (అక్షింతలు)
In the Talaṃbrālu (rice mixed with turmeric) ceremony, the bride and groom pour this rice mixture over each other's head like a shower and is made to be a fun event, sort of an icebreaker for the bride and groom. Married people witnessing this occasion come forward to bless the couple, by sprinkling flower petals and rice coated with turmeric powder.
Then the bride and groom exchange garlands or Dandalu accepting each other as life partners.

Brahma Mudi and Nalla Pusalu
Brahma Mudi is conducted by knotting in betel nuts, dried dates, turmeric twig, betel leaf and coins loosely to the bride's pallu (saree end) and groom's Kanḍuva (scarf end). Then these two ends are tied together by sister of the groom, indicating that they should maintain good relations with both the families.
In order to ward-off the evil eye, the groom's maternal uncle and aunt bring a string of black beads or Nalla Pusalu and hand to the groom to adorn the bride with it.

Nagavalli and Saptapadi (సప్తపది)
As a part of the Saptapadi rituals, the groom and bride walk together seven steps around the sacred fire or Homam, while taking their oaths to nourish each other, to grow together in strength, to preserve their wealth, to share joys and sorrows, to care for each other, to care for children and parents, to remain life long friends. With the Saptapadi, the marriage is complete as per the Vedic scriptures.

Sthālīpākaṃ (స్థాలీపాకం)
Sthālīpākaṃ is a ritual where in the groom adorns the feet of the bride with silver mattelu toe rings. It is also believed that the man bends to the woman in order to claim her as his. The nalla pusalu, along with the mattelu, symbolize that she is a married woman.

Pradhanam (ప్రధానం)
After this, a kunḍa (decorated silver or terra-cotta pot) full of water is placed in front of the couple, and a ring is put in it. The groom puts his right hand in and the bride puts her left hand in and they fish for the ring. They do this three times and whoever wins more often is supposed to be the dominant one in the marriage. This is a time of fun, with chants and shouts of support from both sides. Also, the bride is made to cook (a namesake meal) on the sacred flame of the Agnihōtraṃ, symbolizing she is now responsible for taking care of the health of her husband and family.

Arundhati Nakshatram (అరుంధతి నక్షత్రం)
Arundhati Nakshatram is a ritual where bride and groom are shown the stars representing Arundhati and Vasistha. These stars represent the perfect couple complementing each other. Mizar and Alcor are two stars forming a double star that can be seen with the naked eye in the handle of the Big Dipper (or the Plough) asterism in the constellation of Ursa Major. Mizar is the second star from the end of the Big Dipper's handle, and Alcor its faint companion. Alcor is recognized as Arundhadi.

Āśirvādamu (ఆశిర్వాదము)
The final step in the primary wedding ritual is where the priest chants mantras invoking auspicious blessings on the newlyweds and invites all gathered to join in blessing the couple. Following that, it is customary for the newly weds to bow down to the elders among those who gathered and personally receive their blessings.

Appagintalu (అప్పగింతలు)
Appagintalu takes place at the end of the wedding. This is when the bride is traditionally handed off to the groom and his family.

== Post-wedding customs ==
Gr̥uhapravēśam (గృహప్రవేశం)
After the culmination of the wedding ceremony, the bride is formally taken to the groom’s house. This is called Gr̥hapravēśam of the bride. As she steps into her new home, she is welcomed by the groom’s family members, including his mother and closest relatives. A vessel of rice is placed at the door. After giving harathi to the couple, the mother-in-law asks the bride to gently push the vessel with her right leg. The scattered rice symbolizes the prosperity which the bride brings with her.
In karanam caste, the consummation takes place depending on tidhi, usually after a gap of one day. Havan puja is performed before the time fixed for physical consummation of the marriage.

Satyanārāyaṇa Vratam (సత్యనారాయణ వ్రతం)
Satyam means "truth" and Narayana means "the highest being" so Satyanārāyaṇa means "The highest being who is an embodiment of Truth". The Satyanārāyaṇa Vratam is very popular in Andhra Pradesh India. Satyanārāyaṇa Vratam is performed by bride and groom after Gr̥hapravēśam in the groom's residence, the next morning. This pūja (ritual) is first mentioned in the Skanda Purana, Reva Kanḍa by Sūta Mahāmuni to the r̥shis in the Naimisharaṇya (ancient forest). The details are part of the Katha ("story") that is usually read after the pūja. The Satyanārāyaṇa pūja/vratam can be performed on any day except on the new moon.

Uniting the Maṅgaḷasūtraṃ
Gr̥uhapravēśam is followed by a ceremony, wherein the Maṅgaḷasūtraṃ is united. As a customary, the Telugu speaking people unite the two Maṅgaḷasūtraṃs (which was tied by the groom around the bride’s neck), on a common thread. This ritual is done sixteen days after the wedding. This ritual can be performed by either the groom or an elderly member of the family. A few black or golden beads are slipped between the two 'plates' of the Maṅgaḷasūtraṃ, so that they do not clash with each other. The unison of Maṅgaḷasūtraṃ signifies the harmony between the two families. After the ceremony is over, the bride takes a bath and wears a new sari.
