= Garikapati Narasimha Rao =

Telugu literary performer

Garikipati Narasimha Rao
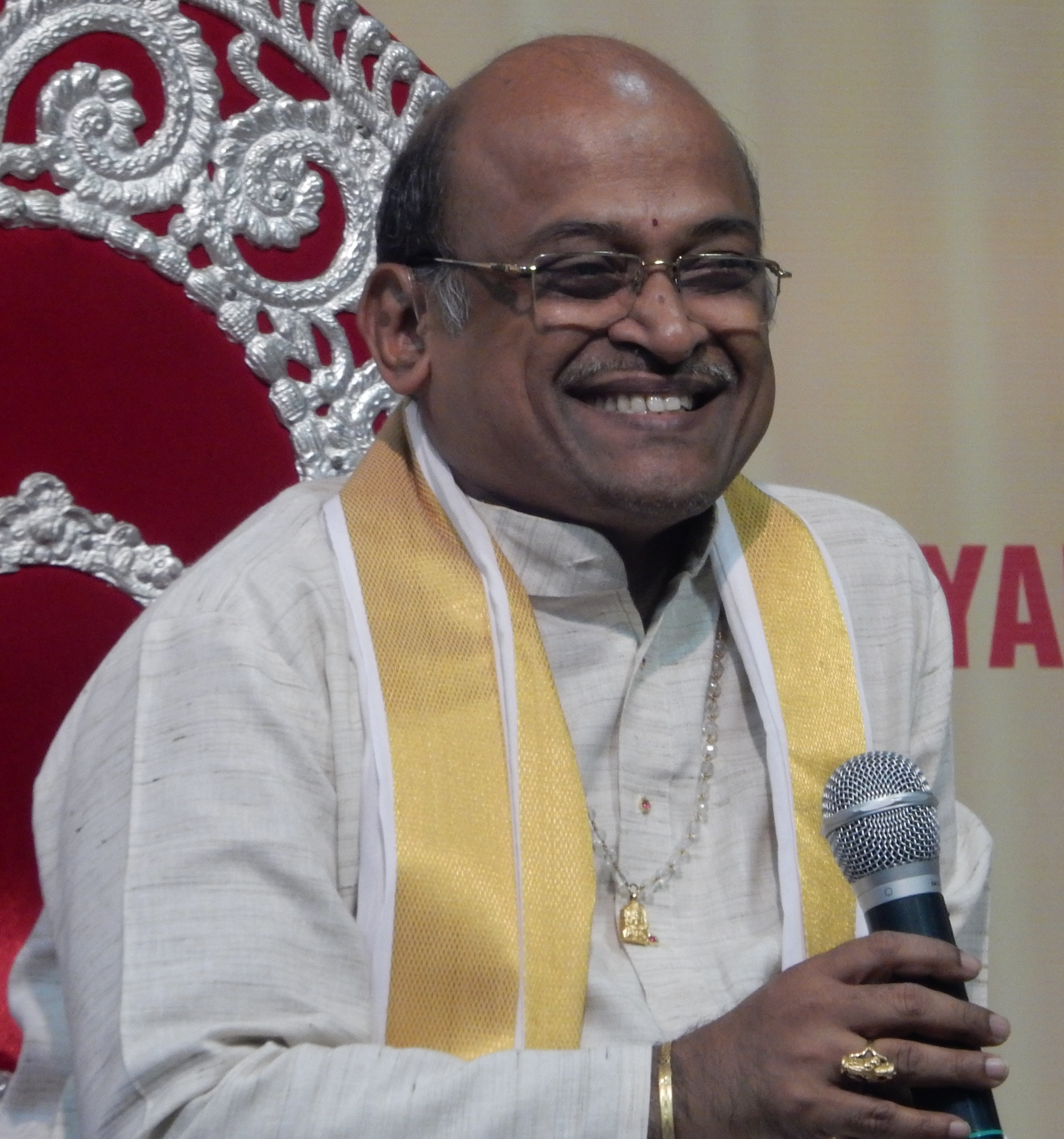
- Garikipati in 2015
- Born: September 14, 1958 (age 68); Bodapadu Agraharam, Pentapadu mandal (near Tadepalligudem), West Godavari district, Andhra Pradesh, India
- Education: M.A, M.Phil, PhD
- Occupations: Orator, avadhani and author
- Works: Sagaraghosha, Vyaktitva Deepam, Ishta Daivam, Vaikuntapali, Avadhana Shathakam
- Parents: Garikipati Venkata Suryanarayana (father); Garikipati Venkata Ramana (mother)
- Awards: Padma Shri (2022)
- Website: https://srigarikipati.com/

Garikipati Narasimha Rao is an Indian scholar, literateur, and avadhani from Andhra Pradesh. In 1996, he performed Avadhanam with 1116 Pruchchakas for 21 days in Kakinada. In 2022, he was awarded India's fourth-highest civilian award, Padma Shri, by the government of India. He also delivers lectures on personality development based on dharmic culture and way of life. He regularly appears on Telugu TV channels like SVBC, Bhakti TV, and ABN Andhra Jyothi giving discourses on ancient Hindu texts such as Bhagavad Gita, Ramayana, and Mahabharata. Personal life

Garikapati was born on 14 September 1958 to Venkata Surya Narayana and Venkata Ramanamma.

Garikapati married Sarada. She is from Amalapuram, East Godavari. He has two sons.

- Sri Sri (named after the famous Telugu poet Srirangam Srinivasa Rao)
- Gurajada (named after the legendary Telugu writer Gurajada Apparao)

== Career ==
Garikapati started performing avadhanams in the year 1972. Avadhanis are respected for their abilities to spin out verses conforming to Telugu grammar on literally any subject that audience may throw at them, as a challenge. He has conducted more than 288 avadhanams, including Dvigunita Avadhanam in Dallas for the American Telugu Association in 2002. Rao is known for his Dhāraṇā (memorising and reciting), which is a key requirement for performing Avadhanams.

== Awards ==
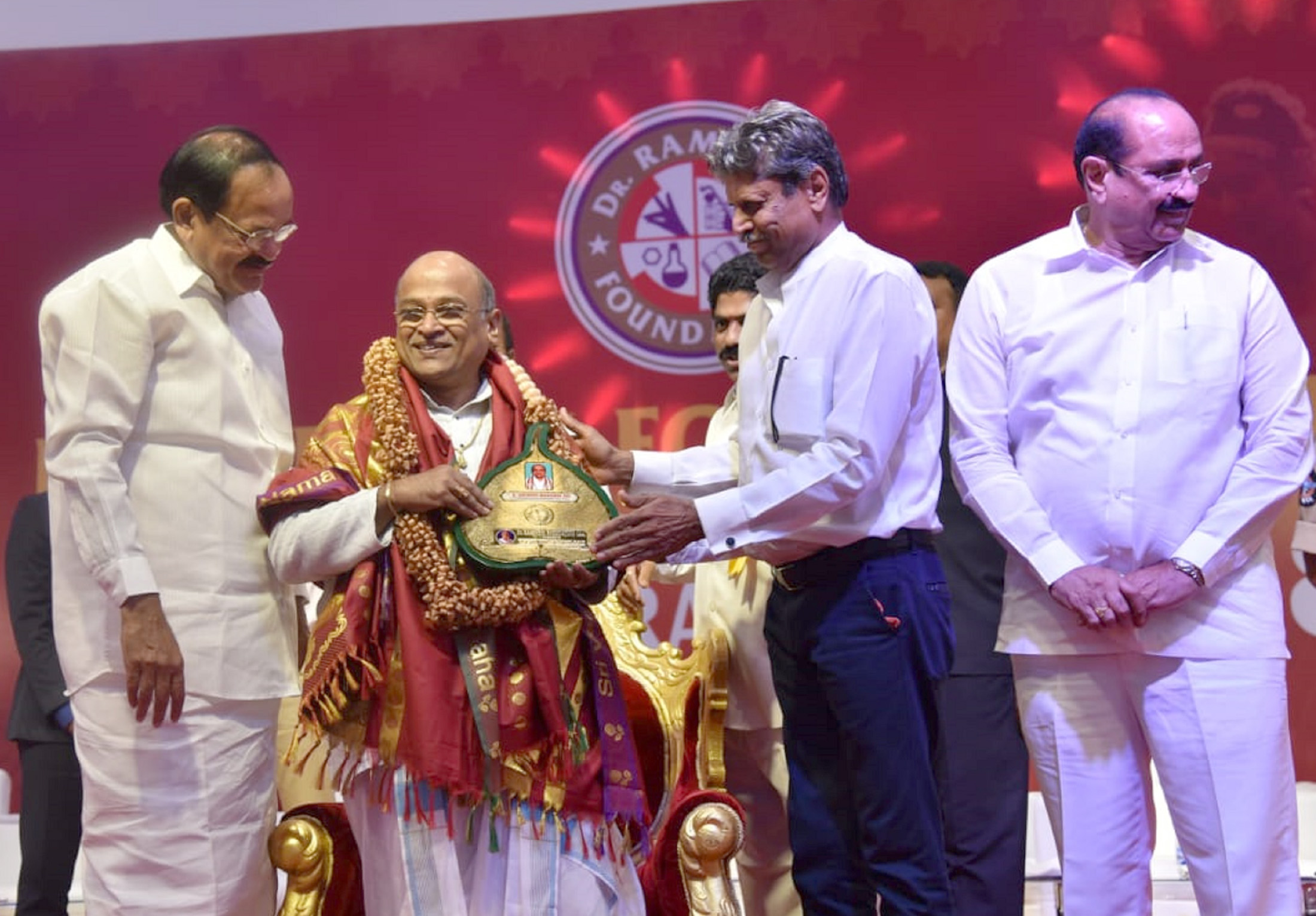
The Vice President, M. Venkaiah Naidu presenting the Ramineni Award in 2018.

- He received Loknayak Foundation Award on 18 January 2016.
- "Gurajada Samskritika Samakhya", a literary organisation, honoured him with "Gurajada Visishta Puraskar" in November 2016.
- He was a recipient of the Ramineni Foundation Awards in 2018.
- He was awarded the Padma Shri in 2022.
