= Chaganti Koteswara Rao =

Indian scholar and spiritual speaker (born 1959)

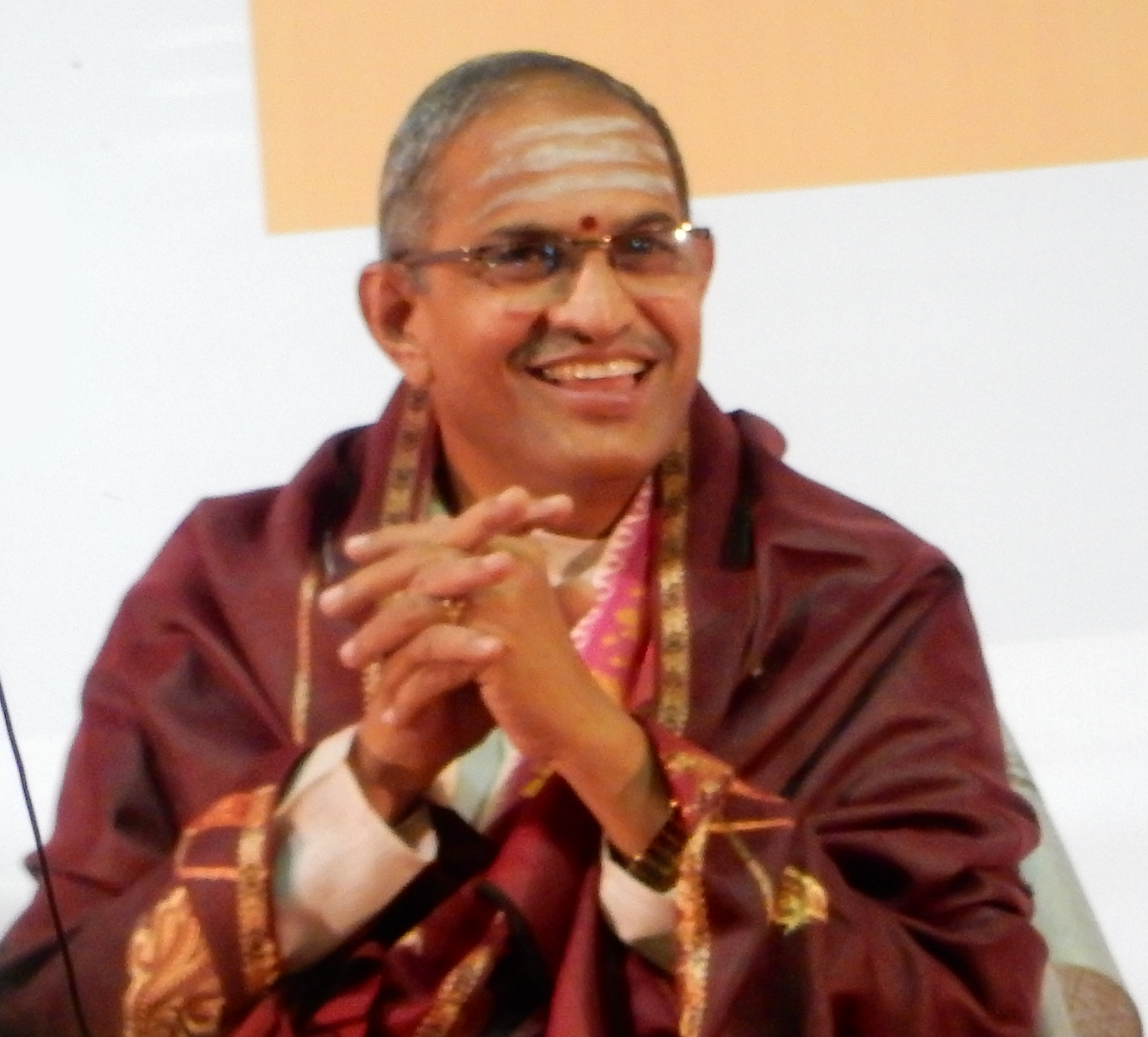
- ChagaKoteswara Rao in August 2015

Personal life
- Born: Chaganti Raja Veera Venkata Basava Koteswara Rao; 14 July 1959 (age 67)
- Spouse: C. Subrahmanyeswaryi
- Parents: Chaganti Sundara Siva Rao (father); Chaganti Suseelamma (mother)
- Honors: Saradaa Gnana Putra, Pravachana Chakravarti
- Website: sriguruvaani.net

Religious life
- Religion: Sanatana Dharma
- Philosophy: Advaita Vedanta

Chaganti Koteswara Rao (born 14 July 1959) is an Indian orator and scholar, known for his discourses on Sanatana Dharma. His teachings are widely known among the Telugu community worldwide and are regularly broadcast on channels such as Bhakti TV and SVBC. Known for his knowledge and engaging style, he has earned titles like Pravachana Chakravarti (Emperor of Discourses) and Sarada Gnana Putra (Son of the Goddess of Knowledge).

In 2016, Koteswara Rao was appointed as the cultural advisor to the Government of Andhra Pradesh and served as one of the ten ambassadors for the Swachh Andhra Corporation. He has also contributed to various state government initiatives related to culture and public awareness.

== Early and personal life ==
Chaganti Koteswara Rao was born on 14 July 1959 to the couple Chaganti Sundara Siva Rao and Chaganti Suseelamma in Eluru, Andhra Pradesh. His father was a staunch follower of Hindu Dharma. During his student days in Eluru, he used to participate in essay writing and elocution competitions on ancient Indian wisdom.

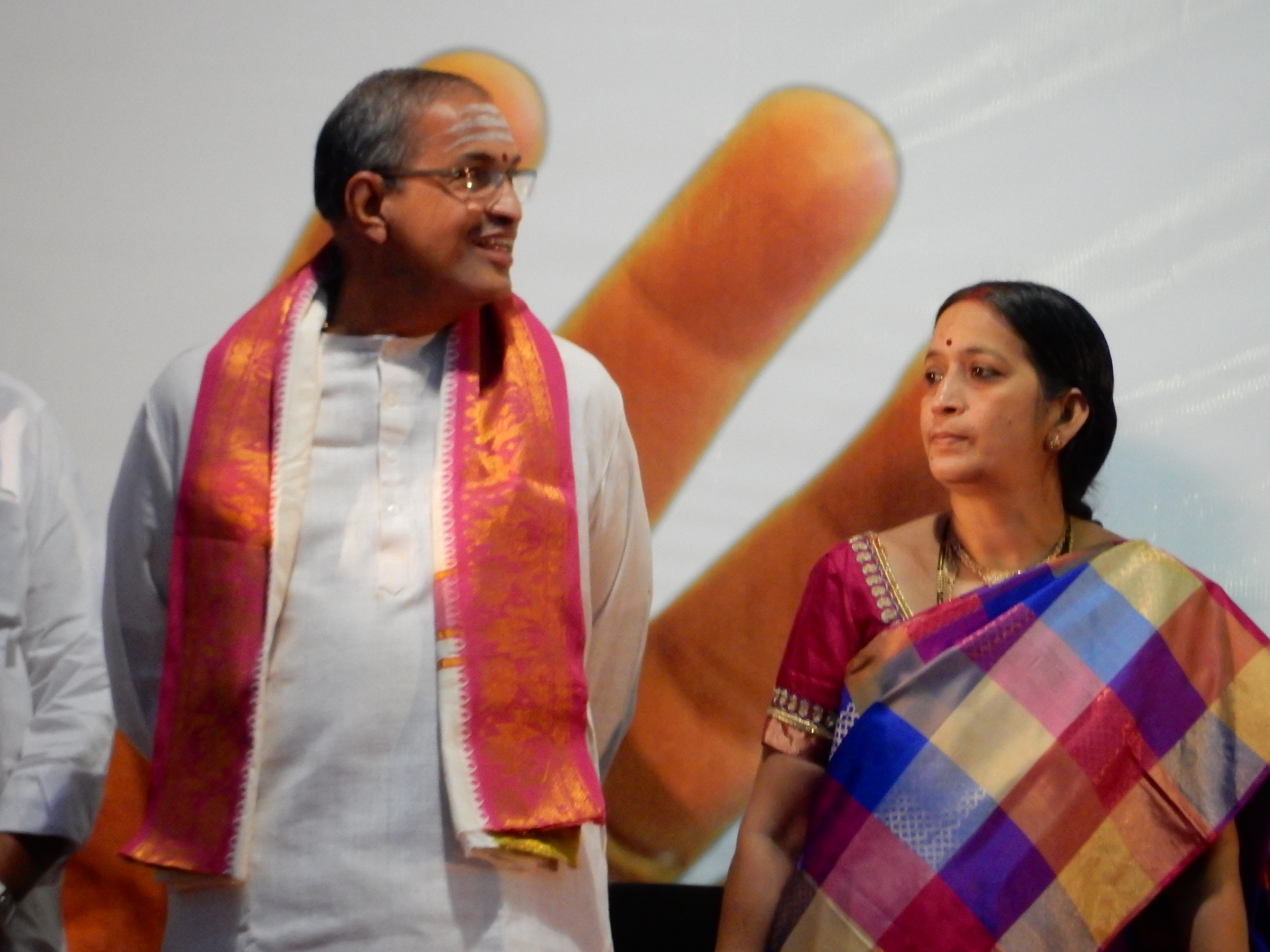
Chaganti Koteswara Rao with his wife

He is married to Subrahmanyeswari. His wife is a state government employee in Agricultural department. He worked for Food Corporation of India in Kakinada and retired as of August 2018. He has two children Shanmukha Charan, and Nagavalli. Both are engineering graduates.

== Religious discourses ==
Chaganti Koteswara Rao regularly gives religious discourses on various Hindu epics like Bhagavata, Ramayana, Mahabharata, and various Puranas. These are broadcast on various radio and TV channels. Some devotional TV channels set aside special slots for airing his discourses. He does not accept any remuneration for delivering a discourse except his traveling expenses.

He has several distinctions for delivering discourses. He completed the discourse on Ramayana in 42 days, Bhagavatam in 42 days, Siva Puranam in 30 days, and Sri Lalita Sahasra Namam in 2-3 months.

== Discourses about Films ==
He also delivered spiritual discourses based on musical films Sankarabharanam (1980) and Srutilayalu (1987).

== Positions ==
Chaganti was appointed as cultural adviser for the Government of Andhra Pradesh in 2016. He was also one of the 10 ambassadors Swacch Andhra Corporation. Chaganti Koteswara Rao was appointed Adviser (Students, Ethics and Values) for the government of Andhra Pradesh in 2024.

== Awards and honours ==
- Honour by Ramineni Foundation, USA in 2015.
- Dr Pinnamaneni and Seeta Devi foundation award (2016)

== Controversies ==
On 5 March 2016, devotees of Shirdi Sai Baba staged a protest against Chaganti Koteswara Rao's remarks about worship of Saibaba during a discourse in 2012. Pending case against him is brought to notice of the government. Later on, clarification of his discourses holding huge respect significantly, the protest was withdrawn.

He also faced protests from All India Yadava Mahasabha because of his remarks on Lord Krishna. Later, the representatives of the community went to his residence. He clarified that he held respect for their community and did not intend to hurt any community.
