= Srinatha =

15th century Telugu poet

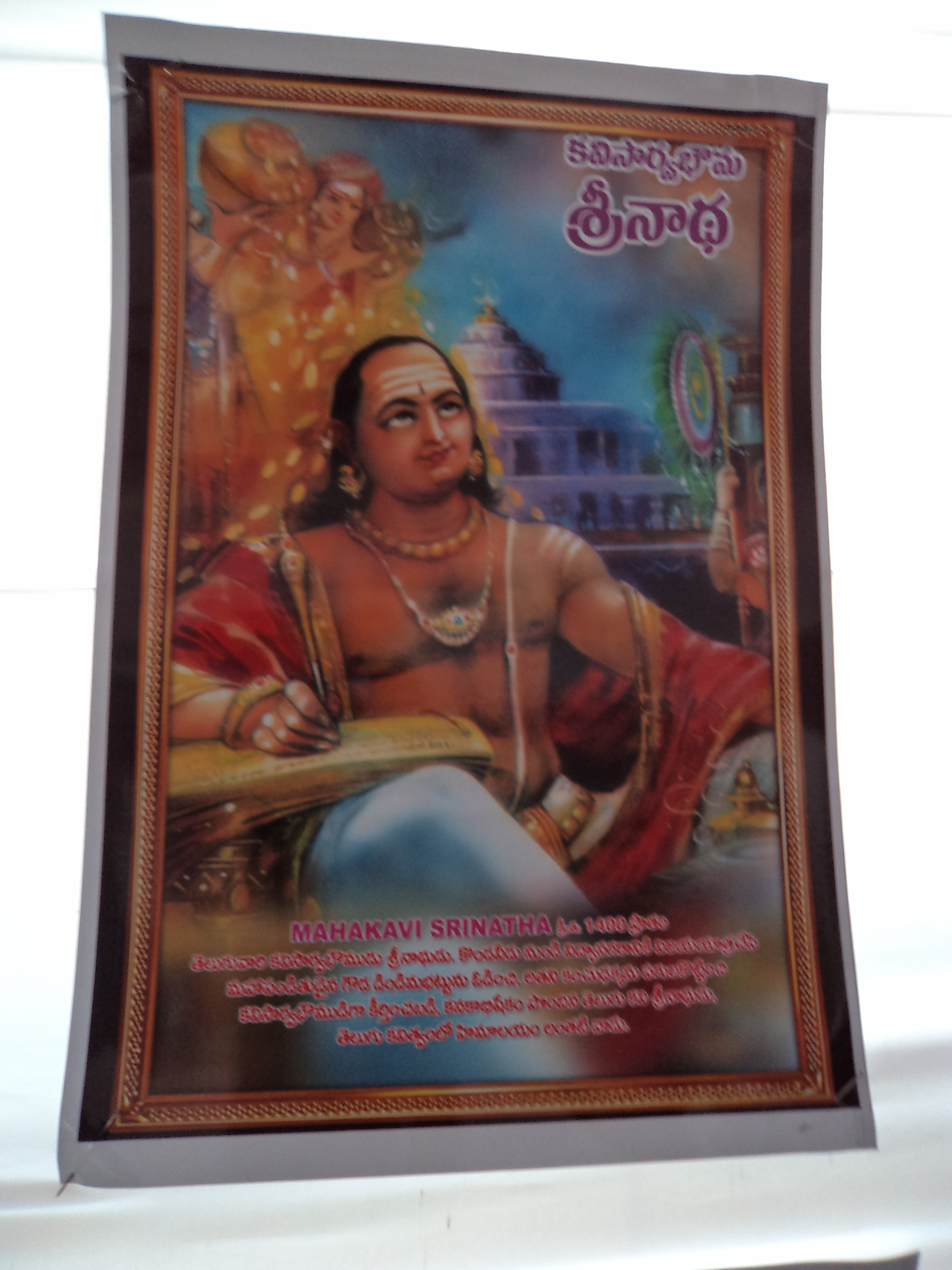
- Born: c. 1355-1360; Coastal Andhra, Godavari Region, Andhra Pradesh, India
- Died: 1441 (aged 70–76); Boddepalli, on the banks of River Krishna
- Occupation: Poet
- Writing career
- Genres: Religion, Hindu

Srinatha (c. 1355-1360 – 1441) was a well-known 15th-century Telugu poet who popularised the Prabandha style of composition.

== Biography ==
Srinatha was born in a Pākanāṭi Niyōgi Telugu Brahmin family of Bharadwaja gotra in Kalapatam village on Gudur Mandal in Krishna district to parents Bhīmāmba and Mārayya in 1355/1360. His grandfather was Kamalanābhāmātyuḍu who allegedly wrote a Telugu translation of Padma Purana.

Srinatha was respected as Kavi Sārvabhauma (King among poets) in Telugu, and patronised by many kings. Srinatha worked as a minister in the court of Pedakomati Vema Reddy of Kondaveedu. He managed to get his king's prestigious knife Nandikanta Pōtarāju Kaṭhāri which was taken away by Lingamanedu ruler of Devarakanda in return for his literary prowess. Srinatha produced and dedicated a host of books to kings and enjoyed a luxurious life. However, he seemed to have suffered from poverty at the end of his life. Srinatha died in 1441, after the conquest of Coastal Andhra by Kapileswara Gajapati.

He was not the brother-in-law of another famous Telugu poet Potana as shown in the Telugu movies.

== Works ==
Srinatha wrote Sivaratri Mahatyam, Haravilāsamu, Bhimakhandam, Kasikhandamu, Srungara Naishadham, Palanati Veeracharitra, Dhananjaya Vijjayam, Marrutaratcharithra, Srungaradipika and Kridabhiramam over the subjects of history and mythology. He translated Salivahana Gatha Saptasati in to Telugu from Prakrit.

== Style ==
Prabandha can be described as a story in verse form with a tight metrical structure. Srinatha's Srungara Naishadhamu is a well-known example of the form.

He is also credited with hundreds of extempore poems called Chatuvulu in Telugu.

Moreover, Srinath was considered popular for his composition of the Seesa Meter in his books, where most part of his eloquent poetry is written in.

== Awards and Titles ==
He was widely regarded as the Kavi Sarvabhouma (The emperor among poets). He had broken the drum of Gouda Dimdimabhattu in the court of Vijayanagara during the reign of Proudhadevarayulu, by his incredible skill of conversing. He was honoured with gold for his dexterity in the Telugu literature by the king.

== In popular culture ==
A biographical film on Srinatha named Srinatha Kavi directed by Bapu was released in 1993 starring veteran actor N. T. Rama Rao, also popularly called Nata Sarvabhoumudu, and Jayasudha.

Srinatha is a prominent character in the Telugu film Bhakta Potana produced by the Vauhini Studios in 1942. In the fim thespian V. Nagayya played the role of Bammera Potana, and Gowrinatha Sastry played the role of Srinatha as the brother-in-law of Potana.

== See also ==
- Peddana, another famous composer of Prabandhas.

== Bibliography ==
- Rao, Velcheru Narayana (2003). "Multiple Literary Cultures in Telugu: Court, Temple and Public". In Sheldon I. Pollock (ed.). Literary cultures in history: reconstructions from South Asia. University of California Press. pp. 383–436. ISBN 978-0-520-22821-4.
- Rao, Velcheru Narayana; Shulman, David (2012), Srinatha: The Poet Who Made Gods and Kings, Oxford University Press, ISBN 978-0199863044
