= Vavilla Ramaswamy Sastrulu =

Vavilla Ramaswamy Sastrulu (1812–1891) was a Telugu Pundit and owner of the Telugu publishing house Saraswati Mudralayamu, which was later renamed Vavilla Press. The Vavilla family in Andhra Pradesh secured a page in history as a premier publishing house owning a press.

== Birth and childhood ==
Ramaswamy Sastrulu was born in a Dravida Brahmin family at Vavilla, a village near Allur, Nellore District.

== First printing press in Telugu ==
Vavilla Ramaswamy Sastrulu started the Telugu press in 1854 in Chennai in a press named Hindu Bhasha Sanjeevini. Later he established Adi Saraswathi Nilayam. During his lifetime till 1891, he published about 50 important books in Telugu and Sanskrit languages. Even C. P. Brown appreciated his efforts, stating: "In days when people had to read books written by hand, V. Ramaswamy Sastrulu relieved their difficulties by starting a printing press". It was later handled by his son Vavilla Venkateswara Sastrulu, who improved it greatly, printing more than 900 books in Telugu, Tamil and English.
