= Niyogi Brahmin =

Indian Hindu Telugu Brahmin subcaste

- Classification: Forward caste
- Religions: Hinduism
- Languages: Telugu (primary); Other Dravidian languages
- Country: Primarily India

Niyogi Brahmin is a Telugu Brahmin subcaste native to the Indian states of Andhra Pradesh and Telangana, but are spread throughout South India and Maharashtra. The traditional occupations of the Niyogi Brahmins are settled cultivation and priesthood, but a majority of them took up various secular vocations including military activities and karanams. They were associated with administration, economics, literature, music composing, politics, scholarly, scientific, engineering, defense and warfare careers.

== Etymology ==
Niyogin in Sanskrit means "employed", "appointed" or "assigned" and it is probable that Niyogis were given this name because they accept secular employment. As per Eastern Chalukyan records, Brahmins who were appointed to a 'Niyoga', commission, charge or office, were called 'Niyogins', officials or functionaries. The term 'Niyogikavallabha' finds mention in a record of Eastern Chalukyan king Mangi Yuvaraja (r. 682 – 706 CE).

== Sub-divisions ==
Niyogis are divided into groups like Aruvela Niyogis, Pakanati Niyogis, Prathamasaki Niyogis and others. Golkonda Vyaparis were said to be a part of Niyogis. The word "vyapari" means trader. While Niyogis were Smartas, Vyaparis are Vaishnavas. In Karnataka and Tamil Nadu, there are some sections of Niyogis such as Aruvela and Prathamasaki who follow Dvaita Vedanta of Madhvacharya.

== See also ==
- Telugu Brahmin
