= Shantha Sinha =

Indian anti-child labour activist

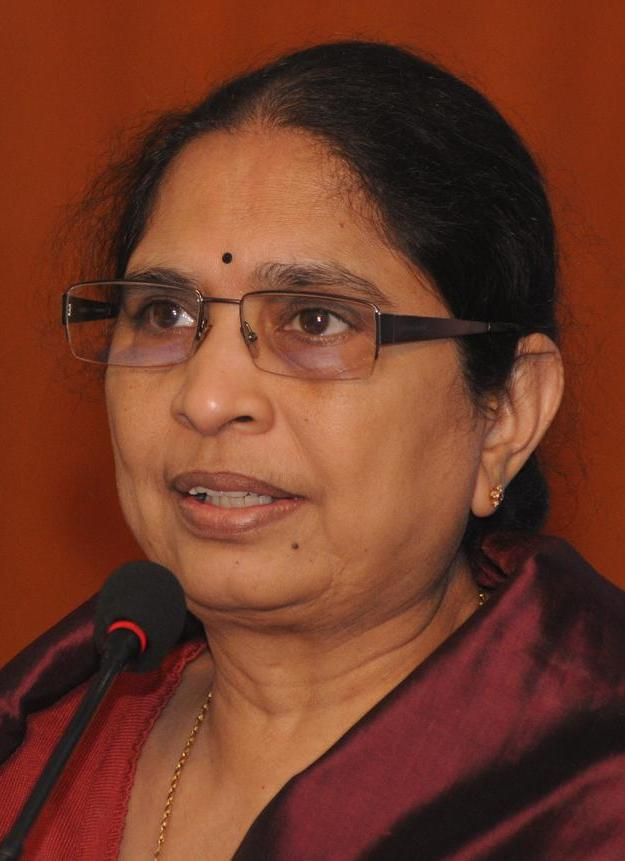
- Born: 7 January 1950 (age 76); Nellore, Andhra Pradesh, India
- Occupations: Social worker, professor
- Awards: Padma Shri (1999); Ramon Magsaysay Award (2003)

Shantha Sinha (born 7 January 1950) is an Indian anti-child labour activist. She is the founder of Mamidipudi Venkatarangaiya Foundation, popularly known as MV Foundation (which is named in memory of her grandfather Mamidipudi Venkatarangaiah), and is a professor in the Department of Political Science in Hyderabad Central University.

She headed the National Commission for Protection of Child Rights for two consecutive terms (three years each); The National Commission for Protection of Child Rights (NCPCR) was set up in March 2007 under the Commission for Protection of Child Rights Act, 2005, an Act of Parliament (December 2005). Sinha was its first chairperson.

She was awarded the civilian honour of Padma Shri by the Government of India in 1998.

== Early life ==
Shantha Sinha was born on 7 January 1950 in Nellore district of coastal Andhra Pradesh. She completed her early schooling in St. Ann's High School, Secunderabad After obtaining a master's degree in political science from Osmania University in 1972, she earned her doctorate from Jawaharlal Nehru University in 1976 and joined the faculty of the University of Hyderabad.

== Career ==
Sinha is an academic with Hyderabad Central University. In 2003, she was given the Ramon Magsaysay Award for Community Leadership, in recognition of her work in "guiding the people of AP to end the scourge of child labour and send all of their children to school". She has also been awarded the Padma Shri (1999), and the Albert Shanker International Award (1999) from Education International. She has also been awarded with Hyderabad Women of the Decade Achievers Award for Social Service by ASSOCHAM Ladies League. A rights activist, her contribution to a phenomenal reduction in child labour in nearly 1200 villages of Ranga Reddy district in Telangana is perhaps unparalleled. Recognizing her work, the Government of India appointed her as the first chairperson of the newly formed NCPCR.

Sinha, Chairperson of the National Commission for Protection of Child Rights (NCPCR) advocated amendment of the Child Labour Act and also requested for including adolescent labourers under its purview in presence of Yogesh Dube, Member of NCPCR and Neela Gangadharan, Secretary, Ministry of Women and Child Welfare, in a function organised by ILO, NCPCR and United Nations Children's Fund on the occasion of Anti-Child Labour Day.
