= List of Indian poets =

This list of Indian poets consists of poets of Indian ethnic, cultural or religious ancestry either born in India or emigrated to India from other regions of the world.

== Assamese ==
- Amulya Barua (1922–1946), first published posthumously in 1964
- Atul Chandra Hazarika (1903–1986), poet, dramatist, children's story writer and translator
- Parvati Prasad Baruva (1904-1964), lyricist, poet and filmmaker
- Bhabananda Deka (born 1929), writer, poet, critic, columnist, playwright
- Ganesh Gogoi (born 1907–1938)
- Hem Barua (1915–1977), poet and politician
- Lakshminath Bezbarua, a doyen of Assamese literature
- Chandra Kumar Agarwala, Romantic poet
- Hemchandra Goswami, Romantic poet
- Ambikagiri Raichoudhury, Romantic poet
- Hiren Bhattacharya (1932–2012), writer, poet, critic, columnist and editor
- Homen Borgohain (1932–2021), writer, poet, critic, columnist and editor
- Indira Goswami (1942-2011), Jnanapith Award winner, poet, editor and academician
- Jyoti Prasad Agarwala (1903–1953), playwright, songwriter, poet, writer and film maker
- Bishnu Prasad Rabha (KolaGuru)
- Nabakanta Barua, also known as Ekhud Kokaideu (1926–2002), novelist and poet
- Nilmani Phookan (born 1933)
- Harekrishna Deka (born 1942), poet, fiction writer, and critic
- Mahim Bora (born 1930), poet, fiction writer
- Santana Tanty (born 1952), poet

== Bengali ==
Bengali language names in parentheses

- Abul Bashar (born 1951), poet and writer
- Annadashankar Roy (1905–2002)
- Bharatchandra Ray (1712–1760), Raygunakar, Shakta court poet and song writer in Krishnanagar
- Binoy Majumdar (1934–2006), Indian poet
- Bishnu Dey (1909–1982), poet, prose writer, movie critic
- Buddhadeb Basu (also spelled "Buddhadeva Bose") (1908–1974), poet, novelist, short-story writer and essayist
- Kumudini Basu (1873–1942), poet, journalist, social reformer, freedom fighter and women's rights activist
- Chandidas (born 1408 CE), refers to (possibly more than one) medieval poet
- Dwijendralal Ray (1863–1913), poet, playwright, and musician, known primarily for patriotic plays and songs, as well as Hindu devotional lyrics
- Girindramohini Dasi (1858–1924), 19th-century poet
- Govindadasa, Medieval Vaishanavite poet
- Humayun Kabir (1906–1969), poet, educationalist, politician, writer, philosopher
- Iswarchandra Gupta (1812–1859), poet and writer
- Jatindramohan Bagchi (1878–1948)
- Jatindranath Sengupta (1887–1954), poet and writer
- Jibanananda Das (1899–1954)
- Joy Goswami (born 1954), Indian poet
- Kazi Nazrul Islam (also spelled "Kazi Nozrul Islam") (1899–1976), poet, musician, revolutionary, and philosopher
- Krittibas Ojha (also spelled "Krittivas Ojha"), medieval poet
- Malay Roy Choudhury (born 1939), founder of the Hungry generation movement
- Mallika Sengupta (born 1960), poet and writer
- Mandakranta Sen (born 1972), feminist poet, youngest winner of Ananda Puraskar and Sahitya Akademi Golden Jubilee award
- Michael Madhusudan Dutta (also spelled "Maikel Modhushudôn Dôtto" and "Datta") (1824–1873), born Madhusudan Dutt, poet and dramatist
- Nabaneeta Dev Sen (Nôbonita Deb Shen) (born 1938), writer and poet
- Nabinchandra Sen (1847–1909), poet and writer
- Premendra Mitra (1904–1988), poet, novelist, short-story writer, including thrillers and science fiction
- Prabhat Ranjan Sarkar (1921–1990), known for Prabhat Samgiita
- Purnendu Patri (born 1930), poet, novelist, artist and film maker
- Rabindranath Tagore (1861–1941), Indian poet who won the 1913 Nobel Prize in Literature
- Ramprasad Sen (1718–1775), Shakta court poet
- Shankha Ghosh (1932–2021), poet and critic
- Shivadasa Sen (born 14th century)
- Samir Roychoudhury (1933–2016), post-modern poet, short story writer, critic and editor
- Subhash Mukhopadhyay (Shubhash Mukhopaddhae) (1919–2003)
- Subhro Bandopadhyay (born 1978), poet
- Subodh Sarkar (born 1958), poet
- Sudhindranath Dutta
- Sukanta Bhattacharya (1926–1947), poet, activist and playwright
- Sukumar Ray (1887–1923), humorous poet, short-story writer and playwright
- Sunil Gangopadhyay (Shunil Gônggopaddhae) (born 1934), Indian poet, novelist
- Syed Kawsar Jamal (born 1950), Indian poet and essayist
- Tarapada Roy (1936–2007), poet, essayist and short-story writer, short stories, and essays, humourist

== Indian poets writing in English ==
In alphabetical order by first name:

- Aditya Tiwari (born 1998 in poetry)
- A. J. Thomas (born 1952), poet, editor
- A. K. Ramanujan (1929–1993), poet and scholar of Indian literature who wrote in both English and Kannada
- Abhay K (born 1980), poet, diplomat, writer, author and artist
- Agha Shahid Ali (1949–2001), Kashmiri-American poet writing in English
- Amit Chaudhuri (born 1962), author and poet writing in English
- Amitabh Mitra poet, artist and emergency medicine physician
- Amol Redij (born 1977), English poet and writer
- Arun Kolatkar (1932–2004), poet writings in English and Marathi
- Arundhathi Subramaniam, poet and writer and web editor writing in English
- Arvind Krishna Mehrotra (born 1947), poet, anthologist, literary critic and translator writing in English
- Bibhu Padhi (born 1951), poet, translator and critic writing in English
- C. P. Surendran (born 1958), poet, novelist and editor writing in English
- D. C. Chambial, poet, editor and critic
- Eunice De Souza (also "Eunice de Souza" (born 1940)), poet, literary critic and novelist writing in English
- Feroze Varun Gandhi (born 1980), poet, politician and columnist
- Fredoon Kabraji (1897–1986), poet, writer, journalist, and artist writing in English
- G. S. Sharat Chandra (1935–2000), author and poet writing in English
- Gieve Patel (born 1940), poet, playwright, painter and a practising general physician
- Gopi Kottoor (born 1956), internationally acclaimed poet, playwright and translator
- Henry Louis Vivian Derozio (1809–1831), Indian poet
- Jagannath Prasad Das (born 1936), also known as J P Das, award-winning poet in English and Oriya
- Jayanta Mahapatra (born 1928), internationally acclaimed poet, winner of Padma Shri and first ever Sahitya Akademi Award for English poetry
- Jeet Thayil (born 1959), poet, novelist, editor, winner of Sahitya Akademi Award and first Indian to win DSC Prize
- Kamala Das also known as "Kamala Suraiya" (born 1934), writer and poet in English and Malayalam
- Keki Daruwalla (born 1937), winner of Padma Shri and Sahitya Akademi Award winner for English poetry
- K. V. Dominic (born 1956), poet, short story writer, critic and editor
- Makarand Paranjape (born 1960), poet writing in English
- Mani Rao (born 1965), poet writing in English
- Meena Alexander (1951-2018), poet, scholar and writer in English, Distinguished Professor of English at Hunter College
- Meena Kandasamy (born 1984), writer, poet, translator and activist
- Michael Madhusudan Dutt (1824–1873), poet and dramatist
- Nissim Ezekiel (1924–2004), poet, playwright and art critic and editor writing in English
- Nalini Priyadarshni (1974), poet, writer, and critic in English
- Nandini Sahu (1973), feminist poet, writer, and critic writing in English
- Neelam Saxena Chandra (born 1969), poet, author, novelist writing in English and Hindi
- P. Lal (1929–2010), poet, translator, professor and publisher; founder and publisher of Writers Workshop in Calcutta, India
- P C K Prem (born 1945), poet, critic and author writing in Hindi and English
- Pritish Nandy (born 1951), poet, journalist, politician, television personality and film producer writing in English
- R. Parthasarathy, poet, translator, critic, and editor writing in English
- Rochelle Potkar, fiction writer and poet
- Raman Mundair, poet, writer, artist and playwright writing in English
- Yuyutsu Sharma (born 1960), poet, editor and translator, writes in English
- Ranjit Hoskote (born 1969), poet, art critic, cultural theorist and independent curator writing in English
- Rashmi Parekh (born 1976), poet of free verse poetry
- Robin S Ngangom, poet writing in English
- Rukmini Bhaya Nair, poet and theorist, writing in English
- Salik Shah, poet, author, editor and publisher in English
- Samartha Vashishtha, poet, editor
- Sarojini Naidu (1879–1949), eminent poet, freedom fighter and administrator writing in English
- Shahzad A. Rizvi (born 1937, Gwalior), author, scholar and poet writing in English and Urdu
- Shiv Kumar, poet, playwright, novelist, short story writer
- Shreekumar Varma (born 1955), newspaper columnist, poet, novelist writing in English
- Smita Agarwal (born 1958), poet, critic, educator, and singer
- Som Ranchan (born 1932), poet and novelist writing in English
- Sri Aurobindo (Sri Ôrobindo, 1872–1950), poet, philosopher, and yogi writing in English and French
- Sudeep Sen, poet and editor writing in English
- Tabish Khair (born 1966), poet, novelist and essayist
- Tapan Kumar Pradhan (born 1972), activist, poet, writer; winner of Sahitya Akademi Golden Jubilee Award for poetry
- Tishani Doshi (born 1975), internationally acclaimed poet; first ever Indian to win Forward Poetry Prize
- T.K. Doraiswamy (Nakulan (1921–2007), poet, novelist, translator and professor of English
- T. Vasudeva Reddy (born 1943), poet, novelist, critic and professor of English
- Toru Dutt (1856–1877), poet, wrote in English and French
- Tushar Jain
- Urvashi Bahuguna, poet and essayist
- Vihang A. Naik (born 1969), poet and educator writing in English and Gujarati.
- Vikram Seth (born 1952), award winning novelist and poet writing in English.

== Gujarati ==
In alphabetical order by last name:

- Akho (1591–1659), poet, Vedantist and radical
- Adil Mansuri (1936–2008), Gujarati poet from Gujarat, India
- Niranjan Bhagat (born 1926), Gujarati poet
- Anil Chavda (born 1985), Gujarati language poet, writer and columnist from Gujarat
- Ashok Chavda (born 1978), Gujarati language poet, writer and critic from Gujarat
- Pir Sadardin, fourteenth-century Ismaili Da'i; regarded as the founder of the Khoja Ismaili sect; also called Satpanth
- Dalpatram (1820–1898), father of Nanalal Dalpatram Kavi
- Dayaram (1777–1853), Gujarati poet of medieval Gujarati literature
- Dileep Jhaveri (born 1943), poet, translator and editor from Mumbai
- Mahadev Desai (1892–1942), writer in English, Gujarati and Bengali
- Suresh Joshi (1921–1986), novelist, short-story writer, critic, poet and writer
- Umashankar Joshi – see listing under "Umashankar", below
- Kalapi (1874–1900), poet and the royal of Lathi state in Gujarat
- Kavi Kant (1867–1923), writer and poet in Gujarati
- Nanalal Dalpatram Kavi (નાનાલાલ દલપતરામ કવિ)
- Jhaverchand Meghani (1896–1947), novelist, poet, short-story writer, folklorist in Gujarati
- Narsinh Mehta, alternate spelling Narasingh Mehta (c. 1414 – c. 1481)
- Chinu Modi (1939–2017), Gujarati poet from Gujarat, India
- Manhar Modi, Gujarati poet from Gujarat, India
- K. M. Munshi (1887–1971), novelist, playwright, writer, politician and lawyer
- Narmad (1834–1886), Gujarati poet, playwright, essayist and reformer during British India
- Vihang A. Naik (born 1969), writes poetry in Gujarati and English
- Ravji Patel (born 1939), modernist poet and novelist in Gujarati
- Rajendra Shah (born 1913), Gujarati poet and Jnanpith Award winner
- Rajendra Shukla, Gujarati poet
- Sundaram (1909–1990), poet, short-story writer, travel writer, biographer and critic
- Govardhanram Tripathi (1855–1907), novelist and poet
- Umashankar Joshi (1911–1988), novelist, poet, playwright, writer and academic; surname: Umashankar, Jnanpith Award winner
- Sitanshu Yashaschandra (born 1941), Gujarati language poet and playwright

== Urdu and Hindi ==
- Abdul Rahim Khan-I-Khana (1556–1627), composer, poet, and produced books on astrology
- Amir Khusrow (1253–1325), musician, scholar and poet
- Ashok Chakradhar (1951– ), author and poet
- Banarsidas (1586–1643), poet, businessman
- Bihari (1595–1663), poet, author
- Bhikhari Das (1721–?), poet
- Bharatendu Harishchandra (1850–1885), novelist, poet, playwright
- Bhawani Prasad Mishra (1913–1985), poet and author
- Dharmveer Bharti (1926–1997), poet, author, playwright and social thinker
- Dushyant Kumar (1933–1975)
- Gulzar (1934– ), poet, lyricist, film director
- Geet Chaturvedi (1977– ), poet, short story author and journalist
- Gopal Singh Nepali (1911–1963), poet of Hindi literature and lyricist of Bollywood
- Gopaldas Neeraj (1924– ), poet and author
- Gulab Khandelwal (1924– ), poetry including some in Urdu and English
- Harivansh Rai Bachchan (1907–2003), poet of Chhayavaad literary movement (romantic upsurge)
- Hemant Shesh (1952– ), writer, poet and civil servant
- Hith Harivansh Mahaprabhu (1502–1552), bhakti Braj Bhasha poet-sant and religious leader
- Jagdish Gupt (1924–2001), Chhayavaad literary movement poet
- Jaishankar Prasad (1889–1937), novelist, playwright, poet
- Javed Akhtar (1945– ), poet, lyricist and scriptwriter
- Jumai Khan Azad (1930–2013), poet
- Jwalamukhi (1938–2008), poet, novelist, writer and political activist
- Jyotsna Milan (1941–2014), poet, novelist, short story writer and editor
- Kabir (1440–1518), mystic poet and saint of India
- Kavi Bhushan (1613–1712), poet and scholar
- Kaka Hathrasi (1906–1995), satirist and humorist poet
- Kedarnath Agarwal (1911–2000), Hindi language poet and littérateur
- Kedarnath Singh (1934– ), poet, critic and essayist
- Keshavdas (1555–1617), best known for his Rasik Priya, a pioneering work of the riti kaal
- Kripalu Maharaj (1922–2013), spiritual master and poet
- Kumar Vishwas (1970– ), poet and professor
- Kunwar Narayan (1927– ), poet
- Kanwal Ziai (1927–2011)
- Mahadevi Varma (1906–1987), poet, woman's activist and educationist
- Maithili Sharan Gupt (1886–1964), poet, politician, dramatist, translator
- Makhanlal Chaturvedi (1889–1968), Indian poet, writer, essayist, playwright and journalist
- Meera (1498–1547), mystic singer and composer of Bhajans
- Mohan Rana (1964– ), poet
- Murari Lal Sharma Neeras (1936– ), poet and educator
- Naresh Mehta, poet and playwright
- Nagarjun (1911–1998), poet, writer, essayist, novelist
- Nawal Kishore Dhawal (1911–1964), writer, poet, proofreader, editor, critic, journalist and author
- Neelam Saxena Chandra (b 1969), poet, writer, novelist
- Nivedita Jha, Hindi poet, journalist and women's rights activist
- Padma Sachdev, poet, novelist (Hindi and Dogri language)
- Parichay Das, writer and editor and contemporary Bhojpuri poetry
- Pawan Karan (1964– ), poet, writer, editor, and journalist
- Prasoon Joshi (1971– ), poet, lyricist
- Rambhadracharya (1950– )[β], Hindu religious leader, educator, Sanskrit scholar, polyglot, poet, author, textual commentator, philosopher, composer, singer, playwright and Katha artist
- Ramdhari Singh Dinkar (1908–1974), poet, essayist and academic
- Ramesh Chandra Jha (1925–1994 ), poet, novelist and freedom fighter
- Rustam Singh (born 1955), poet, philosopher, translator and editor
- Ravindra Prabhat (1969– ), author and poet
- Quaiser Khalid (1971–), author and poet
- Sachchidananda Vatsyayan (1911–1987), poet, writer, novelist, journalist, traveller
- Saadat Bano (1893–1970), poet and independence activist
- Sahir Ludhianvi, lyricist, poet from Punjab (Ludhiana)
- Samartha Vashishtha, poet, editor
- Shivmangal Singh Suman (1915–2002), poet and academician
- Shail Chaturvedi (1936–2007), poet, humorist, lyricist, actor
- Soumitra Mohan (1938-), poet, editor, photographer
- Sri Lal Sukla (1925–2011), author, writer
- Subhadra Kumari Chauhan (1904–1948), poet
- Sudama Panday 'Dhoomil' (1936–1975), poet
- Sūdan (1700–1753), poet, writer
- Sumitranandan Pant (1900–1975), Chhayavaad poetry, verse plays and essays
- Suryakant Tripathi 'Nirala' (1899–1961), poet, novelist, essayist and story-writer
- Suryakumar Pandey (Born 1954), poet, writer
- Surdas (1467–1583), composer and devotional poet
- Tara Singh, poet
- Teji Grover (born 1955), Hindi poet, fiction writer, translator and painter
- Tulsidas (1532–1623), poet-saint, reformer and philosopher
- Tribhuvan (born 1964), poet, writer, and journalist
- Uday Prakash (1952– ), scholar, poet, journalist, translator and short story writer
- Valmiki, poet-saint, author of the epic Ramayana
- Virendra Kumar Baranwal (born 1941), Indian poet and writer
- Vrind (1643–1723), poet

== Kannada ==
- A. K. Ramanujan (1929–1993), poet and scholar of Indian literature who wrote in Kannada and English
- Kuvempu (1904–1994)
- D. R. Bendre (1896–1981)
- Gopalakrishna Adiga (1918–1992)
- V. K. Gokak (1909–1992)
- K. S. Narasimhaswamy (1915–2003)
- U. R. Ananthamurthy (1932–2014)
- Adikavi Pampa (902–975)
- Ranna (949-?)
- Janna (13th century)
- Harihara
- Vaidehi (1945– )
- D. V. Gundappa (1887–1975)
- Purandara Dasa (1484–1564)
- Kanaka Dasa (1509–1609)
- M. Govinda Pai (1883–1963)
- Dinakara Desai (1909–1982)
- Gangadevi (14th century)
- Gourish Kaikini (1912–2002)
- Kumara Vyasa (late 14th-early 15th century)
- Akka Mahadevi (1130–1160)
- Nagavarma I (late 10th-early 11th century)
- Nagavarma II (late 11th-early 12th century)
- T. N. Srikantaiah (1906–1966)
- B. M. Srikantaiah (1884–1946)
- G. S. Shivarudrappa (1926–2013)
- Allama Prabhu (12th century)
- Shishunala Sharif (1819–1889)
- Sarvajna (16th century)
- K. S. Nissar Ahmed (1936– )
- Masti Venkatesha Iyengar
- Gorur Ramaswamy Iyengar
- Raghavendra Swami (belongs to Kannada Madhva Brahmin; born in 1595 or 1598 or 1601 CE)
- Devanur Mahadeva (1948 Devanuru village Nanjangud taluk, Mysore district, Karnataka)
- Sri Ponna (born 9th to 10th century)
- Kayyar Kinhanna Rai (1915 to 2015)
- Raghavanka (12th century)
- Rudrabhatta (12th century)
- Palkuriki Somanatha (1195)
- Kesiraja (13th century)

== Kashmiri ==
- Allama Muhammad Iqbal
- Abdul Ahad Azad (1903–1948)
- Agha Shahid Ali
- Amin Kamil (1924–2014)
- Arnimal (died 1800)
- Ghulam Ahmad Mahjur (1885–1952)
- Habba Khatun (16th century)
- Lalleshwari, also known as "Lalla" or "Lal Ded"
- Mahmud Gami (1765–1855)
- Maqbool Shah Kralawari (1820–1976)
- Nund Reshi (1377–1440)
- Rasul Mir (died 1870)
- Rehman Rahi (1925–2023), poet, translator and critic
- Rupa Bhavani (1621–1721)
- Zinda Kaul 'Masterji' (1884–1965)
- Hakeem Manzoor (1937–2006)
- Ghulam Nabi Firaq (1922–2016)

== Konkani ==
- Balakrishna Bhagwant Borkar (1910–1984), also known as "Baki-baab"
- R. V. Pandit, vast poetic production in Konkani, and some in Portuguese
- Uday Bhembre
- Ramesh Veluskar, prominent and award-winning Konkani poet

== Maithili ==
- Vidyapati, also known as Vidyapati Thakur and called Maithil Kavi Kokil "the poet cuckoo of Maithili" (c. 1352 – c. 1448), Maithili poet and Sanskrit writer
- Rashtrakavi Ramdhari Singh Dinkar, 23 September 1908 – 24 April 1974, poet, essayist, freedom fighter, patriot and academic
- Acharya Ramlochan Saran (1889–1971), littérateur, grammarian, publisher and poet
- Jayamant Mishra (1925–2010), Sanskrit scholar and Maithili poet

== Malayalam ==
- Thunchaththu Ramanujan Ezhuthachan, called the "Father of the Malayalam language" (fl. 16th century)
- Johann Ernst Hanxleden, also known as "Arnos Paathiri" (1681–1732), German Jesuit priest
- Poonthanam Namboothiri (fl. 16th century), devotional poet
- Kunchan Nambiar (1705–1770)
- Unnayi Warrier
- Irayimman Thampi (1783–1862), court poet and musician
- Moyinkutty Vaidyar (1857–1891)
- Kumaran Asan (1873–1924)
- Kerala Varma Valiya Koyithampuran, also known as Kerala Varma (1845–1914), poet and translator
- Vallathol Narayana Menon (1878–1958)
- Ulloor S Parameswara Iyer (1877–1949)
- K. V. Simon (1883–1943)
- K.C. Kesava Pillai (1868–1914)
- A. R. Raja Raja Varma (1863–1918), poet, grammarian, scholar, critic and writer
- Changampuzha Krishna Pillai (1911–1948), poet and translator
- Edappalli Raghavan Pillai (1909–1936)
- P. Kunhiraman Nair (1906–1974)
- Sanjayan
- G. Sankara Kurup, aka "Sankara Kurup" (died 1978)
- Vyloppilli Sreedhara Menon, aka "Vailoppilli Sreedhara Menon" (1911–1985)
- Edasseri Govindan Nair (1906–1974))
- N.V. Krishna Warrier (1916–1989), poet and scholar
- Thirunalloor Karunakaran (1924–2006), poet and scholar
- P. Bhaskaran (1924–2007), poet and film songwriter
- Vayalar Ramavarma, also spelled Vayalar Rama Varma (1928–1975)
- O.N.V. Kurup (born 1931)
- Vishnunarayanan Namboothiri (born 1939)
- Kunjunni (died 2006)
- Balamani Amma
- Sugathakumari
- M. Govindan (1919–1988)
- K. Ayyappa Panicker, also spelled Ayyappa Paniker, Indian (1930–2006)
- Attoor Ravi Varma
- Kadammanitta Ramakrishnan, popularly known as Kadammanitta (1935–2008)
- Satchidanandan (born 1946), critic (writing in Malayalam and English), poet (in Malayalam)
- S. Rajasekharan (born 1946), poet and literary critic
- D. Vinayachandran
- A. Ayyappan (born 1949)
- Balachandran Chullikkad (born 1957), poet and actor
- Joy Vazhayil (born 1963), poet and thinker
- Nellikkal Muraleedharan (born 1948), poet, writer and critic
- Venu V Desom
- P. P. Ramachandran
- T. P. Rajeevan (born 1959), poet, novelist and literary critic.
- V. M. Girija (born 1961), poet
- Veerankutty
- Syam Sudhakar (born 1983), poet and literary critic
- Maythil Radhakrishnan (born 1944), poet, novelist, columnist

== Manipuri ==
- Nongthombam Biren Singh, politician, poet and former journalist
- Ashangbam Minaketan Singh (1906-1995), founder of modern Meitei literature, author of Manipuri epic "Basanta sheireng", winner of Padma Shri, Sahitya Akademi and Soviet Land Nehru Prize
- Robin S Ngangom (born 1959), poet who writes in English and Meiteilon
- Angom Gopi (1710-1780), classical Manipuri poet, translator of Bhagavad Gita and Bible into Meitei language
- Rajkumar Shitaljit Singh (1913-2008), poet, writer and teacher, winner of President's Medal and Sahitya Ratna award
- Elangbam Nilakanta Singh (1927-2000), author of "Tirtha Yatra" and "Manipuri Sheirang"; winner of Padma Shri and Sahitya Akademi Award

== Marathi ==
- Samarth Ramdas, wrote Manache Shlok; known as the Guru of Shivaji Maharaj
- Sant Dnyaneshwar, also known as "Sant Jñāneshwar" and "Jñanadeva" (1275–1296), saint, poet, philosopher and yogi
- Eknath or Eknāth (1533–1599), poet and scholar
- Tukaram (birth-year estimates range from 1577–-1609 – died 1650)
- Keshav Pandit, also known as Keshav Pandit or Keshav Bhat Pandit (died 1690), religious official under Chhatrapati Shivaji, poet and Sanskrit scholar
- Raghunath Pandit
- Suresh Bhat 1932–2003), known as Ghazal Samrat (Emperor of ghazals) for his exposition of that form
- Namdeo Dhasal (born 1949), poet, writer, journalist, editor and Dalit activist
- Manohar Oak (born 1933), poet and novelist
- Arun Kolatkar (born 1931 or 1932), poet who wrote both in Marathi and English; also a graphic designer
- Bahinabai Chaudhari (1880–1951), illiterate poet whose son wrote down her poems for her
- Tryambak Bapuji Thombre "Balkavi"
- Vilas Sarang (born 1942), writer, critic, translator and poet
- Kusumagraj, pen name of Vishnu Vāman Shirwādkar (1912–1999), poet, writer and humanist
- P. S. Rege (1910–1978), poet, playwright, fiction writer and academic
- Shanta Shelke (1922–2002), poet, journalist, professor, composer, story writer, translator, writer of children's literature
- Hemant Divate (born 1967), poet, editor of Abhidhanantar magazine, translator
- Hridaynath Mangeshkar (born 1937), eminent poet and composer of songs mainly in Marathi and Hindi
- Manya Joshi (born 1972), Marathi poet
- Mangesh Narayanrao Kale (born 1966), poet, editor, critic and translator
- Saleel Wagh (born 1967), poet, translator, critic
- G. D. Madgulkar, popularly known in his home state of Maharashtra by his initials, Ga Di Ma (1919–1977), poet, lyricist, writer and actor; older brother of writer Venkatesh Madgulkar
- Poet Borkar, Balakrishna Bhagwant Borkar, also known as "Baki-baab" (1910–1984), wrote mostly in Marathi but with numerous works in Konkani
- Vinayak Damodar Savarkar (1883–1966), revolutionary freedom fighter, ideologue and thinker who composed mainly poems and songs of nationalist and revolutionary sentiments
- Varjesh Solanki (born 1967), award-winning Marathi poet
- Vasant Abaji Dahake (born 1942), poet, novelist, playwright, artist, and critic
- Bhau Panchbhai, poet and dalit activist
- Mangesh Padgaonkar (born 1929), Marathi poet and recipient Maharashtra Bhushan Award
- Indira Sant

== Nepali ==
See also: List of Nepali-language poets

- Agam Singh Giri (1927–1971)
- Hari Bhakta Katuwal (1935-1980)
- Kamala Sankrityayan (1920-2009)
- Parijat (1937–1993)
- Rajendra Bhandari (born 1956)
- Salik Shah (his bilingual poetry collection, "Khas Pidgin," won Elgin Award nomination from Science Fiction & Fantasy Poetry Association in 2018)
- Tulsiram Sharma 'Kashyap' (1939 – 1998)
- Yuyutsu Sharma (born 1960)

== Odia ==
- Jayadeva (1170-1245), author of the famous Gita Govinda in Sanskrit and some poems in Odia (12th century)
- Sarala Das (15th century AD), author of the Odia Mahabharata in verse (15th century)
- Jagannatha Dasa, author of the Odia Bhagabata and one of the panchasakha (15th century)
- Achyutananda Dasa, author of Sunya Sanghita and multiple other texts, one of the panchasakha (16th century)
- Salabega (born 1607 or 1608), Muslim author of many bhajans and devotee of Jagannath
- Upendra Bhanja (born from 1670 to 1688), poet and member of the royal family of a princely state
- Abhimanyu Samantasinghara, author of Bigadha Chintamani
- Bhima Bhoi (1850–1895), author of Stuti Chintamani, blind Mahima saint poet of Odisha
- Brajanath Badajena (1729-1799), awarded Kabi Bhushana, author of classics like "Samara Taranga" and "Chatura Binoda"
- Brajanath Ratha (1936-2014), poet, writer, social activist, winner of Tagore Award
- Fakir Mohan Senapati (1843–1918), short-story writer, novelist, poet, writer, government official and social activist
- Gangadhar Meher (1862-1924), known as Svabhava Kavi and Prakriti Kavi (Nature Poet), author of "Tapaswini" epic
- Gopabandhu Das (1877-1928), called Utkala Mani ("Gem of Orissa"), social worker, political activist, writer, novelist and poet
- Jayanta Mahapatra (born 1928), winner of Padma Shri and Sahitya Akademi Award
- Krushna Chandra Kar
- Manmohan Acharya
- Nanda Kishore Bal (1875-1928), known as Palli Kavi (Poet of Rural Life), penned popular lyrics for children called "Nana Baya Geeta"
- Nirmala Devi
- Radhanath Ray (1848-1908), known as Kabibar (Supreme Poet), author of epics like "Chilika", "Chandrabhaga", "Mahajatra" and "Kedara Gouri"
- Sitakanta Mohapatra (born 1937), winner of Padma Bhusan, Padma Vibhusan, Sahitya Akademi, Jnanpith Award and Tagore Award
- Ramakrushna Nanda (1906-1994), eminent writer of children's literature, author of the morning prayer song "Ahe Dayamaya Vishwa Vihari" sung in all Odia schools
- Pratibha Satpathy (born 1945), poet, editor and winner of Sahitya Akademi Award
- Ramakant Rath (born 1934), author of epic "Shri Radha", winner of Padma Bhusan, Saraswati Samman and Sahitya Akademi Fellowship
- Tapan Kumar Pradhan (born 1972), author of Kalahandi and winner of Sahitya Akademi Golden Jubilee Award
- Sachidananda Routray (1916-2004), winner of Jnanapith Award, author of "Baji Rout", "Pratima Nayak", "Pallishri" and "Chhota Mora Gaan"
- Rabi Singh (1931-2020), freedom fighter and Marxist writer of revolutionary poems
- Upendra Bhanja (1670-1740), known as Kavi Samrat (King of Poets), author of epics like "Vaideheesha Vilasa", "Prema Sudhanidhi", "Lavanyavati" etc

== Punjabi ==
- Bhagat Sadhana (12th century)
- Baba Farid (12th–13th century)
- Bhagat Sain (14th-15th century)
- Guru Nanak (15th-16th century)
- Bhai Mardana (15th-16th century)
- Guru Angad (16th century)
- Shah Hussain (16th century)
- Guru Amar Das (16th century)
- Baba Sunder (16th century)
- Guru Ram Das (16th century)
- Balvand Rai (16th-17th century)
- Satta Doom (16th-17th century)
- Guru Arjun Dev (16th-17th century)
- Bhatt Balh (16th-17th century)
- Bhatt Bhalh (16th-17th century)
- Bhatt Bhika (16th-17th century)
- Bhatt Gayand (16th-17th century)
- Bhatt Harbans (16th-17th century)
- Bhatt Jalap (16th-17th century)
- Bhatt Kirat (16th-17th century)
- Bhatt Kalshar (16th-17th century)
- Bhatt Mathura (16th-17th century)
- Bhatt Nalh (16th-17th century)
- Bhatt Salh (16th-17th century)
- Bhagat Surdas (16th-17th century)
- Sultan Bahu (16th–17th century)
- Damodar Das Arora (17th century)
- Saleh Muhammad Safoori (17th century)
- Guru Tegh Bahadur (17th century)
- Bulleh Shah (17th–18th century)
- Waris Shah (18th century)
- Khwaja Ghulam Farid (18th–19th century)
- Mian Muhammad Bakhsh (19th century)
- Qadaryar (19th century)
- Peelu (19th century)
- Hashim (19th century)
- Shardha Ram Phillauri (19th century)
- Shareef Kunjahi (20th century)
- Mir Tanha Yousafi (20th century)
- Anwar Masood (20th century)
- Afzal Ahsan Randhawa (20th century)
- Aatish (20th century)
- Shaista Nuzhat –(20th century)
- Bhai Veer Singh (20th century)
- Jaswant Singh Rahi (20th century)
- Dhani Ram Chatrik (20th century)
- Faiz Ahmad Faiz (20th century)
- Amrita Pritam (20th century)
- Darshan Singh Awara (20th century)
- Dr. Harbhajan Singh (20th century)
- Shiv Kumar Batalvi (20th century)
- Sharif Kunjahi (20th century)
- Paash (20th century)
- Surjit Paatar (20th century)
- Ajmer Rode (20th century)
- Ustad Daman (20th century)
- Balwant Gargi (20th-21st century)
- Sukhdarshan Dhaliwal (20th-21st century)
- Sukhbir (20th-21st century)
- Munir Niazi (20th-21st century)
- Satinder Sartaj (21st century)
- Javaid Rahi (21st century)

== Rajasthani ==
- Dursa Arha (1535 – 1655), 'First Nationalist Poet Of India' 16th-century warrior and Rajasthani poet
- Suryamal Misran (1815 – 1868), 19th century Rajkavi (State Poet & Historian) of Bundi State
- Mahatma Isardas (1539 – 1618), Rajasthani saint-poet
- Narharidas Barhath (1648 – 1733), Rajasthani saint-poet
- Brahmanand Swami (1772 – 1832), saint of the Swaminarayan Sampraday and as one of Swaminarayan's Paramahamsa
- Chand Bardai, Court poet of Prithvi Raj Chauhan
- Kaviraj Bankidas Asiya, 18th-century Raj-Kavi (State Poet & Historian) of Jodhpur State
- Kanhaiyalal Sethia (1919 – 2008), Rajasthani and Hindi poet
- Sanwar Daiya
- Sawai Singh Dhamora (1926 – 2017)
- Kriparam Khidiya, author of "Rajiya ra Sortha"
- Fateh Karan Charan, Rajasthani poet & leader of the Bijolia Movement
- Lakshmi Kumari Chundawat (1916 – 2014), Indian author and politician
- Shakti Dan Kaviya (1940 – 2021), Sahitya Akademi Award recipient- poet, writer, and scholar of Rajasthani, Dingal, Brajbhasha, & Hindi
- Narayan Singh Bhati (1930 – 1994), founder of Rajasthani Research Institute (Chopasani, Jodhpur)
- Vijaydan Detha (1926 – 2013), Padma Shri & Sahitya Akademi Award recipient noted Rajasthani poet & writer
- Arjun Deo Charan (born 1954), Rajasthani poet, critic, playwright, theatre director and translator
- Chandra Prakash Deval, Rajasthani poet and translator, convener of Rajasthani Advisory Council of Sahitya Akademi.
- Bhanwar Singh Samaur (born 1943), Sahitya Akademi Award recipient, writer, poet, historian, and social worker
- Kaviraja Shyamaldas (19th century), Rajkavi (State Poet & Historian) of Udaipur State
- Swarupadas (1801–1863), Dadu Panthi poet
- Thakur Akshay Singh Ratnu (1910 – 1995), Rajasthani, Brajbhasha and Hindi poet
- Thakur Kesari Singh Barhath (1872–1941), Indian revolutionary leader & poet

== Sanskrit ==
Ancient poets

- Valmiki, author of Ramayana
- Vedavyasa, author of Mahabharata Ashtadasapurana

Classical poets

- Kālidāsa, Classical Sanskrit poet and dramatist writer of Kumara Sambhavam, Meghadootam, abhignana shakuntalam
- Adi Sankara, author of a lot of poems; Bhaja Govindam, Soundarya Lahari, Eulogy on Brahma sutrams, Bhagavathgita Bhashyam and Lalitha Sahasranama
- Bharavi, author of Kiratarjuniya
- Magha
- Bhatti, author of Bhattikāvya, known as Rāvatavadha

Medieval poets

- Jayadeva (1200 AD), author of Gita Govinda
- Narayana Panditacharya, author of Sumadhvavijaya, Sangraha Ramayana
- Vedanta Desika (1269–1370), Sri Vaishnava writer, poet, devotee, philosopher and teacher

Early modern poets

- Kavikalanidhi Devarshi Shrikrishna Bhatt (1675–1761), court poet of Jai Singh II
- Krishnadevaraya (died 1529), king of the Vijayanagara Empire and poet
- Prabodhananda Sarasvati (16th century), Vaishnava bhakti poet-saint
- Vadiraja Tirtha (1480–1600), Dvaita saint, poet, devotee and philosopher

Modern Poets

- Jagadguru Rāmabhadrācārya
- Ram Karan Sharma, of New Delhi
- Srinivas Rath (1943-2014), Sahitya Akademi Award winner and founder of Kalidasa Akademi
- Vanikavi Manomohan Acharya, Cuttack
- Pandhareenathachar Galagali
- Rama Kant Shukla (born 1940), winner of Padma Shri, Kalidasa Samman, Sahitya Akademi Award
- Shridhar Bhaskar Warnekar (1918-2007), winner of Kalidasa Samman and Sahitya Akademi Award

== Sindhi ==
- Moti Prakash

== Tamil ==
Sangam poets (c. 300 BC to 300 AD)

- Agastya
- Avvaiyar, a poet who lived during the Sangam period (c. 1st and 2nd century CE)
- Kadiyalur Uruttirangannanar
- Kapilar

see also Sangam literature

Post-Sangam poets (200 AD to 1000 AD)

- Thiruvalluvar ([fl.] c. 2nd – 8th century AD), poet who wrote the Thirukkural, an ethical work
- Ilango Adigal (300 to 700 AD), wrote the epic Cilappathikaaram
- Nakkeerar (fl. c. 9th century)
- Sīthalai Sāttanār
- Tirutakkatevar
- Avvaiyar, an 8th-century Tamil poet

Bakthi period poets (700 to 1700 AD)

- Manikkavacakar
- 63 Nayanars, namely Appar, Sambanthar, Sundarar etc.
- 12 Alvars, namely Poigaialvar, Boothathaalvaar etc.
- Sekkizhar (fl. 12th century), poet and scholar
- Kambar
- Ottakoothar
- Arunagirinathar
- Pattinathar
- Siva Prakasar
- Avvaiyar, a 12th-century Tamil poet

Patriots and British period poets

- Anandabharati Aiyangar (1786–1846)
- Henry Alfred Krishnapillai (1827–1900, author of Ratchanya Yaatrigam)
- Subramanya Bharathi called Mahakavi Bharati ("Great Poet Bharati") (1882–1921) poet, writer, independence advocate and reformer
- Subramanya Siva (1884–1925), poet and independence advocate
- Bharathidasan, also spelled Bharatidasan (1891–1964), poet, playwright, screenwriter, short-story writer and essayist
- Kavimani Desigavinayagam Pillai
- Sheikh Thambi Pavalar
- Ramalinga Swamigal

Modern

- Perunchithiranar (1933–1995), poet and philosopher
- Kannadasan (1927–1981), poet and song lyrics writer
- Vaali (1931–2013), poet and song lyrics writer
- Annamalai Reddiyar, Tamil poet
- Vairamuthu, poet and song lyrics writer
- Pudhumaipithan
- T. K. Doraiswamy ("Nakulan")
- Prof. Karmegha Konar
- P. Vijay, poet who writes song lyrics for films
- Mu. Metha, poet and songwriter
- L. S. Kandasamy
- V. Akilesapillai (1853–1910), Sri Lankan scholar, poet and writer
- Perumal Rasu, poet, writer, painter and spiritual master
- Manushyaputhiran

== Telugu ==
Medieval poets

- Nannaya Bhattaraka, also known as the First Poet "Aadi Kavi", the first poet of the Kavi Trayam, or "Trinity of Poets", that translated Mahabharatamu into Telugu over the course of a few centuries
- Tikkana also called "Tikkana Somayaji" (1205–1288), poet and member of Kavi Trayam
- Errana also known as "Yellapregada" or "Errapregada" (fl. 14th century).
- Gona Budda Reddy – 13th-century poet
- Annamacharya (1408–1503), mystic saint composer of the 15th century, widely regarded as the Telugu pada kavita pitaamaha (grand old man of simple poetry); husband of Tallapaka Tirumalamma
- Sri Krishnadevaraya, Vijayanagar Emperor, Telugu language patron, Telugu language poet
- Allasani Peddana, 15th-century poet and known as foremost of Asthadiggajas (Eight elite Telugu poets under Sri Krishnadevaraya)
- Nandi Thimmana, a member of Ashtadiggajas
- Madayyagari Mallana, a member of Ashtadiggajas
- Dhurjati, a member of Ashtadiggajas
- Ayyalaraju Ramambhadrudu, a member of Ashtadiggajas
- Pingali Surana, a member of Ashtadiggajas
- Ramarajabhushanudu, a member of Ashtadiggajas
- Tenali Ramakrishna, poet, scholar, thinker and a special advisor in the court of Sri Krishnadevaraya, nicknamed Vikatakavi
- Molla, also known as "Mollamamba", both popular names of Atukuri Molla (1440–1530), poet who wrote Telugu Ramayan; a woman
- Potana, born Bammera Pothana (1450–1510), poet best known for his translation of the Bhagavata Purana from Sanskrit; the book is popularly known as Pothana Bhagavatham
- Tallapaka Tirumalamma, also known as "Timmakka" and "Thimmakka" (fl. 15th century), poet who wrote Subhadra Kalyanam; wife of singer-poet Annamacharya and was popularly known as Timmakka
- Vemana (fl. 14th century), poet
- Bhadrachala Ramadasu, 17th-century Indian devotee of Lord Rama and a composer of Carnatic music.

Rennaissance poets

- Kandukuri Veeresalingam (1848–1919), social reformer, poet, scholar, founded the journal Vivekavardhani, introduced the essay, biography, autobiography and the novel into Telugu literature
- Gurajada Apparao (1862–1915), poet, writer and playwright who wrote the first Telugu play, Kanyasulkam; also an influential social reformer sometimes called Mahakavi ("the great poet")
- Gurram Jashuva (1895–1971), a dalit poet and writer and producer of All India Radio, awarded "Padma Bhushan" by the Govt of India, known for poetry on social evils
- Sri Sri, Srirangam Srinivasa Rao (1910–1983), marxist poet notable for his work Maha Prasthanam
- Jwalamukhi, pen name of Veeravalli Raghavacharyulu (1938–2008), poet, novelist, writer and political activist
- Viswanatha Satyanarayana (1895–1976), popularly known as the Kavi Samraat ("Emperor of Poetry")
- Balijepalli Lakshmikantham (1881–1953), poet and dramatist
- Chellapilla Venkata Sastry, poet and scholar
- Devulapalli Krishna Sastry (1887–1981), poet and writer of radio plays, known as "Andhra Shelly"
- Devarakonda Balagangadhara Tilak
- Divakarla Tirupati Sastry
- Rayaprolu Subba Rao
- C. R. Reddy

Modern poets

- C. Narayana Reddy (born 1931), poet, academic and songwriter
- Aarudhra, pen name of Bhagavatula Siva Sankara Sastry (1925–1998), author, poet, essayist, writer of stories (including detective stories), playwright, translator, composer of film songs
- Ismail, popular name of Mohammad Ismail (born 1928)
- Suravaram Pratap Reddy, writer and historian from Telangana
- Kethu Viswanatha Reddy, poet from Rayalaseema
- Gunturu Seshendra Sarma (1927–2007), also known as Yuga Kavi
- Papineni Sivasankar, poet and critic from Andhra Pradesh
- Sirivennela Sitaramasastri, popular poet and lyricist
- Ramesh Karthik Nayak, poet who writes in Telugu, Banjara and English from Telangana
- Janardhana Maharshi, poet who has written poems in Telugu and published books.

== Urdu ==
In alphabetical order by last name:

- Maghfoor Ahmad Ajazi (1900–1966), poet, writer, orator and prominent Indian freedom fighter from Muzaffarpur, Bihar
- Javed Akhtar (born 1945), eminent lyricist and script writer for movies
- Mir Babar Ali Anis
- Kaifi Azmi
- Bashir Badr (1935–2026), eminent Ghazal writer, winner of Padma Shri, Sangeet Natak Akademi and Sahitya Akademi awards
- Mirza Ghalib (1797–1869), world famous Ghazal writer from Mughal Era
- Hakeem Manzoor (1937–2006) writer, poet and administrator.
- Raza Naqvi Wahi, poet from Patna, Bihar
- Rafiq Husain
- Rahat Indori (1950–2020), famous Bollywood lyricist
- Masud Husain Khan
- Syed Mahmood "Talib" Khundmiri
- Syed Hasnain Raza Naqvi
- Nazish Pratapgarhi
- Shahzad A. Rizvi (born 1937), author, scholar and poet
- Iftikhar Imam Siddiqui
- Kanwal Ziai
- Mir Taqi Mir
- Quaiser Khalid (1971–), author and poet

== See also ==
- Indian poetry
- List of Indian English poetry anthologies
