= Muzammil H. Siddiqi =

Indian-American writer (born 1943)

- Born: 1943 (age 82–83); Rampur, India
- Education: Aligarh Muslim University and Darul Uloom Nadwatul Ulama, Lucknow, India. Islamic University of Madina in Saudi Arabia, Birmingham University, Harvard University.
- Alma mater: Birmingham University, Harvard University
- Spouse: Khalida Siddiqi
- Children: 4

Muzammil H. Siddiqi (born 1943) is an Indian-American Muslim writer who has been on the faculty of Chapman University.

Academically, Siddiqi is an adjunct professor of Islamic Studies at Chapman University in Orange, California. He is also an external examiner for the Departments of Islamic Studies at the University of Durban-Westville in South Africa, the University of Karachi, Pakistan and University of Punjab, Lahore, Pakistan.

Internationally, he is a member of the Supreme Islamic Council of Egypt and the Supreme Council of Mosques in Mecca, Saudi Arabia, and a member of the Executive Board of the International Assembly of the Council of Ulama' in Mecca. He is a founding member of the Council of 100 of the World Economic Forum based in Switzerland. The Council aims to foster dialogue and better relations between Islam and the West.

== Education ==
Born in India in 1943, Siddiqi received his early education at Aligarh Muslim University and Darul-uloom Nadwatul Ulama, Lucknow, India. He graduated from the Islamic University of Medina in Saudi Arabia in 1965 with a higher degree in Arabic and Islamic Studies. Siddiqi received an M.A. in Theology from Birmingham University in England, and a Ph.D. in Comparative Religion from Harvard University in the United States.

== Career ==
Siddiqi was chairman of the Religious Affairs Committee of the Muslim Students Association in the United States and Canada, and he also served as director of the Islamic Center of Washington, D.C. Siddiqi served two terms (1997–2001) as president of the Islamic Society of North America with headquarters in Indiana. Since 1981, Siddiqi serves as the director of the Islamic Society of Orange County in Garden Grove, California. He has also served as the chairman of the Shura Council of Southern California, an organization representing the Islamic centers, masjids, and organizations in Southern California. He is the chairman of the Fiqh (Islamic Law) Council of North America and is a founding member of the Council of Mosques in the U.S. and Canada.

He conducted a weekly religious radio program from Pasadena from 1982 until 2004, and has contributed articles to Islamic and academic journals, encyclopedias, and other publications. He writes a weekly column for Pakistan Link in Los Angeles on the issues of Islamic law and social problems.

== Interfaith programs involvement ==
Siddiqi is the current President of the Academy of Judaic-Christian and Islamic Studies at the University of California in Los Angeles (UCLA). He has participated in many inter-religious dialogues, and spoke at the World Assembly of the World Council of Churches in Vancouver, Canada and the World Assembly of Religions in Vatican, the World Parliament of Religions in Chicago. Siddiqi participated in many seminars organized by the National Council of Churches and the National Council of Christians and Jews in the United States.

In September 2001, on the National Day of Prayer and Remembrance, he was invited by President George W. Bush to lead a Muslim Prayer at the Interfaith Prayer Service at Washington National Cathedral. In September 2006 he was again invited by President Bush to lead an interfaith prayer on the 5th Anniversary of 9/11 at Ground Zero in New York City, New York.

== Awards and recognition ==
Siddiqi received the Humanitarian of the Year Award in 1999 from the National Council of Christians and Jews. In November 2005, he was recognized by Orange County Register as one of the top 100 most influential people who shaped Orange County in the last twenty five years. In August 2006, as part of a special feature called "The West 100", the Los Angeles Times recognized Siddiqi as one of the top 100 most powerful people in Southern California with the following description: "Siddiqi, whose mosque is among the largest in North America, is the religious leader of thousands of Southern California Muslims at a time when xenophobia is running high… he has been a leader in driving home the point that Muslims in the U.S, are peace-loving."
