= Azmat-E-Maa =

2014 poetry book by Anjum Lucknowi

- Author: Anjum Lucknowi (Indian poet)
- Original title: عظمت ماں
- Translator: Nehal Azmi
- Language: Urdu, Hindi
- Publisher: Bazm-E-Urdu Adab Kavi Sanstha (BUAKS)
- Publication date: October 9, 2014
- Publication place: Mumbai, India
- ISBN: 9798215506295
- Website: www.openlibrary.org

Azmat-e-Maa (Hindi: अज़्मत-ए-माँ, Urdu: عظمتِ ماں) is an Urdu philosophical poetry book by Anjum Lucknowi. It was published in 2014 by the Mumbai-based Bazm-E-Urdu Adab Kavi Sanstha (BUAKS).

== Overview ==
Azmat-e-Maa is an Urdu poetry collection written by Indian poet Anjum Lucknowi. The book focuses on the theme of motherhood and highlights the emotional depth, sacrifice, and unconditional love of a mother through a series of heartfelt poems. The collection includes notable pieces such as "Ek Bhara Ghar Sambhalti Hai Maa" (इक भरा घर संभालती है माँ) "Maa Ke Rishte Se Bada Kya Koi Rishta Hoga" (माँ के रिश्ते से बड़ा क्या कोई रिश्ता होगा). The work reflects Lucknowi's sensitivity towards familial values and social emotions, blending traditional Urdu expression with modern sentiment.

== Content ==
The 36 poems in Azmat-E-Maa were written by Lucknowi over a period of a year in Urdu and Hindi. Lucknowi's poems quote the verses of the Quran.

The first page of the book contains a stanza (Hindi; मुझको झूले में जब झुलाती है।, माँ मुझे लोरियाँ सुनाती है।) describing love between parents and children. Lucknowi has said the book aims to teach children the importance of parents.

== Publication and Launch ==
The book Azmat-e-Maa was written by poet Anjum Sir over a period of six to eight months and was published in 2014 by Bazm-e-Urdu Adab Kavi Sanstha. Its formal release (Rasm-e-Ijra) took place the same year at Hazrat Shaikh Misri Dargah during a grand Mushaira. The event was attended by Bollywood actress Salma Agha, Mumbai's Inspector General (IG) IPS Quaiser Khalid, the then Chairman of the Maharashtra Urdu Sahitya Academy Abdul Rauf Khan Khadse and poet Sharif Manzar, among other notable guests.

== Reception ==
Azmat-e-Maa was appreciated in Urdu literary circles for its heartfelt portrayal of motherhood and simple, emotional language. The poems were also well received at several mushairas and public readings.
