= Asma Gull Hasan =

American writer

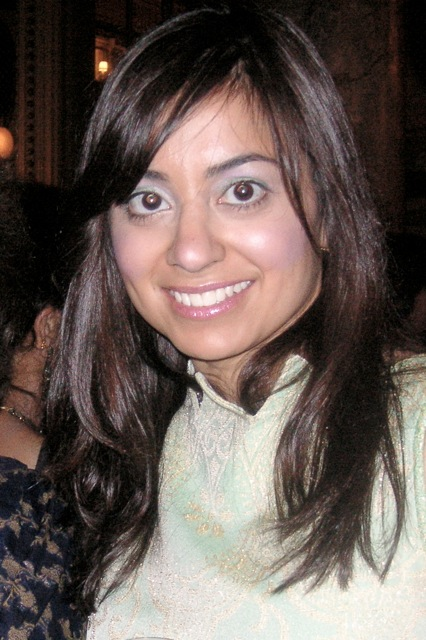
- Asma Gull Hasan
- Occupations: Writer, Political Pundit, Chief Legal Officer
- Writing career
- Genre: American Muslim literature
- Notable works: Red White and Muslim, American Muslims: A New Generation, Why I Am A Muslim
- Notable awards: Nominated, National MS Society, Outstanding Work in Diversity; 2006

Asma Gull Hasan is an American writer. Her work includes the book Red, White, and Muslim, a biographical view of growing up as an American Muslim. She is the daughter of Pakistani immigrants, born in Chicago, United States and raised in Pueblo, Colorado.

== Early life ==
Asma Gull Hasan is the daughter of Malik M. Hasan and Seeme Gull Khan Hasan (co-founder of iSufiRock.com). She is the sister of film director and writer Muhammad Ali Hasan and cousin of Pakistani rock singer Salman Ahmad. She also has a sister, Aliya Gull Hasan and another brother, Rehan Khan Hasan.

Hasan grew up in Pueblo, Colorado, where she snowboarded and rode horses as a child. Hasan explains that she calls herself a "cowgirl" based on the cowboy values of appreciating the outdoors, oneself, and other people.

Hasan went on to receive her diploma from Groton School in 1993, where she graduated magna cum laude. She obtained a Bachelors in Arts from Wellesley College in 1997, graduating magna cum laude, as well as being named a Durant Scholar. And in 2001, she received her Juris Doctor from New York University.

== Career ==
=== Writer ===
Hasan is the author of three published works, including American Muslims: The New Generation (Continuum 2000), Why I Am A Muslim (HarperCollins Thorsons/Element 2004), and Red, White, and Muslim (HarperCollins 2008).

As an American Muslim voice, Hasan has been chosen for educational presentations and missions by United States Department of State, in hopes of building better relations between Muslims and the United States. One such mission included sending Hasan to Ethiopia, where she spoke to people all over the country about the commonalities between Islamic and American culture, in hopes of building stronger relations between both countries.

Interviews of her work as an author are often seen on C-SPAN's Book TV.

=== Political pundit ===
Hasan appears frequently on Fox News and CNN as an American Muslim voice and political commentator. Her television appearances include The O'Reilly Factor, Anderson Cooper 360, Hannity and Colmes, and CNN Newsroom.

Hasan is a Republican, often using her punditry to provide insight into Republican policies and their effect on the Muslim world.

Her op-eds have been published in The New York Times, The San Francisco Chronicle, and Beliefnet among others. She was a columnist for The Pueblo Chieftain, The Denver Post, and The Pakistan Link newspapers. Her other political pundit appearances include the Today, Politically Incorrect, Fresh Air with Terry Gross, The Dennis Miller Show of CNBC and The History Channel.

As of 2008, Hasan worked as a political blogger for Glamour Magazine and its political website, Glamocracy, a website dedicated to featuring weekly political insight from American women writers.

=== Law ===
Hasan received her law degree from New York University. She currently serves as a senior vice president and chief legal officer to HealthTrio LLC, a software company that specializes in electronic healthcare record technology.

== Views ==
Hasan has said that the hijab is not required, because modesty comes from within.

She has also expressed a deep admiration for Sufism, a mystical practice within Islam. The views are expressed in various interviews as well as in her book, Why I Am a Muslim. Of note, Hasan served as one of the contributors on iSufiRock.com.

Hasan has stated that bigotry and intolerance towards Muslims Americans has increased in the last decades. Hasan notes the rising and sometimes open hostility towards the Islamic faith, the Quran and mosques by some non-Muslim Americans and politicians.

== Works ==
- Red, White, and Muslim: My Story of Belief (2009)
- Why I Am a Muslim: An American Odyssey (2004)
- American Muslims: The New Generation (2000)
