= Syed Mahmood Khundmiri =

Urdu writer (1938–2011)

Syed Mahmood Talib Khundmiri
- Born: 14 February 1938; Bidar, Karnataka, India
- Died: 16 January 2011 (aged 72); Lonavla, Maharashtra, India
- Occupations: Architect, poet, artist
- Writing career
- Pen name: Talib Khundmiri (Urdu: طالب خوندمیری)
- Period: 20th century
- Genres: Ghazal and Nazm
- Subjects: Love, philosophy, religion

Syed Mahmood Khundmiri (Urdu: سید محمود خوندمیری) (known popularly by his takhallus Talib) was an Indian Urdu language poet, humorist, architect, artist, orator, and one of the leading Urdu poets of the 20th and 21st centuries. He concentrated on humorous poetry, and was considered among the elite of Urdu humor. He died of cardiac arrest on 16 January 2011, in Pune, Maharashtra, India)

Khundmiri was born 14 February 1938 in Donegal Bidar, Karnataka, India. In addition to his own writing career, he was involved in many organizations. He was one of the senior most member of Zinda Dalaan-E Hyderabad (a grass-roots arts and humor group) and served on its executive board from 1963 to 2011. He also served on the executive board of Shugoofa, an Urdu periodical, for more than 40 years. Talib, a pseudonym given to him by his peers, combined poetry with both sarcasm and humor. Known for his elevated style and tone in the world of Urdu literature, he combined life experiences with his artistic gifts as a versatile poet and architect.

== Family ==
Khundmiri married Syeda Ayesha Khundmiri, and they had six children: Syeda Salma Khundmiri, Syed Zeeshan Khundmiri, Syed Irfan Khundmiri, Syed Faizan Khundmiri, Afreen Suroor Khundmiri , and Syeda Yasmeen Khundmiri.

== Early life ==
=== Childhood ===
Khundmiri's grandfather, Syed Miran, was his mentor and the most ardent supporter. Khundmiri spent most of his childhood with his grandfather who was an accomplished home builder. Miran sahab inspired him to become an architect and in 1963 Khundmiri earned his Architectural degree. He recited his first poem about his grandfather when he was 12 years old and upon his grandfather's encouragement started writing poems. He was a talented man just like his grandfather. He participated in many competitions during his school and college days and won many awards.

=== Education ===
Khundmiri attended school in Musheerabad where he lived for 16 years before moving to Chanchalguda on 31 May 1963. He was a versatile man and participated in many extra-curricular activities during his academic career. He also played football with his senior school mate, Syed Nayeemuddin, who was a former Captain and a couch of India national football team. He enrolled in the Jawaharlal Nehru Fine Arts and Architecture University in Hyderabad and earned his architecture degree with the License No 35. He was also elected as a "Fellow of Indian Institute of Architects" on 16 May 1992 with the Registered serial No. 1716.

== Career ==
=== Writings ===
Khundmiri's poetry and writing career started when he was 12 years. In his college days he and his few friends started a magazine and organization called Bazm-E-Urdu and won Basheerunnissa basher memorial ruling trophy. He was a gifted writer and a poet. He has written many articles in Munsif Urdu daily newspaper weekly column called Turfa tamasha. He has also written a book called Sukhan Ke Parde Mein and now this book is used as a curriculum in Shimoga university of Karnataka. When Khundmiri was seventeen, one of his close relatives, Alam Khundmiri, (an important intellectual figure and a dynamic writer of his time) anticipated that he would be an amazing poet and a writer in the future.

Dua-e-siyah (Gazal)

Yeh dua hai tujhse mere khuda,

meri khak itni ujaal de

Ke agar ana ki ramaq bhi ho,

mere jism-o-jaan se nikaal de

Meri baat kya, meri zaat kya,

yeh nafs hai kya yeh hayaat kya

Yeh toh mushte-khaak hai jab talak,

tera aks isme na daal de

Mujhe ijazz deke badha bana,

tera khauf deke khara bana

Woh mizaaj mujh ko bhi kar ata,

ke faqeeri jiski misaal de

Tera zikr mera libaas ho,

tu hamesha mere hi paas ho

Na toh koi aur hi sonch de,

na toh aur koi khayal de

Mein toh ek banda pur qatah,

meri larzishon ka shumaar kya

Ke khadam jamake rahun khada,

koi aisa mujh me kamaal de

Kabhi itna soz-e-daroon badha,

kabhi itna josh-e-junoon badha

Ke tujhi se tujhko hi maang loon,

woh talb woh zarf sawaal de

Tera kabse TALIB-e-deed hoon,

tera shiftah bhi shadeed hoon

Ke umeed war-e-navee hoon,

mujhe khaali haath na tal de!!!!

Talib Khundmirii

Khatmalon ki faryaad is one of his famous Nazms which was translated in English. The verses are as follows:

Ek din ek jonk se kuch khatmalon ne yeh kaha
Dijiye khala hame bhi koi aisa mashwara
Ab Bajaye khoon koi aur hi shaey pi sakein
Admi se door rehkar ham Khushi se jee sakein
Kyunki iss me khoon ab kam kam hi paya jaye hai
Ab na choosa jaye hai isko na chaata jaye hai
Iski sheeryanon me yu toh khoon milta hi nahi
Mil bhi Jata hai toh iss me zayqa kuch bhi nahi
Kaun jaane kya bala khane laga hai admi
Kis milawat ki ghiza khane laga hai admi
Hum Jo peete hain usey khoon maannaa bekaar hai
Kyunki iska rang bhi pehchanna dushwaar hai
Isme surqi se zyada hai safedi aajkal
Khoon ki surat hogayi hai doodh ki si aajkal
Ek zamana tha ke hamne khoon ke darya bhi piye
Aaj Ghanton choostey hain ek khatre ke liye
Kya kahein khala hamari pyaas bhujti hi nahi
Isse pehle yeh girani khoon ki thi hi nahi
Ab haseeno ki rago mein bhi ab lahu bakhi nahi
Inki mehfilon mein bhi koi khoon bhara sakhi nahi
Pehle Inka khoon hua karta tha manind sharab
Yu mahekta tha rago me jaise gulshan me gulab
Choostey hi inko apna bhi nikharta tha shabab
Ek nayi karvat badalta tha badan me aztarab
Booye khono se mast ho kar jhoomne lagte they hum
Apni apni khatmaliyo ko choomne lagte they hum
Hogaye hain aajkal woh naujawaan bhi badmazaa
Jinki sheeryano mein behti thi kabhi joo-ye tila
Jinka khoon peete hi aksar mauj me aate the hum
Moo lagte hi jinhe sar-shar hojate they hum
Ab unhi ko choos kar bimar padjate hai hum
Sukh jatey hain, sukad jatey hain, sad jatey hain hum
Ab kahan tak hum karein apne ghamo ka tazkera
Kuch Dino pehle hamare saath aisa bhi hua
Phoot Nikli thi hamare jism se gaanje ki boo
Peeliyaa tha bhool kar humne Jo hippi ka lahoo
Kya kahein kya kya balaa, kya khahar unke khoon me hai
Tiktweenty se zyada zehar unke khoon me hai
Apni sari chashni khone laga hai admi
Haye! Kitna be-maza hone laga hai admi
Sun chuki hai khatmalon ki dastani tishnagi
Ek adaaye khoon chakaan se jonk yeh kehne lagi
Aaj tak tune piya hai sirf janta ka lahu
Ab Zara pi kar toh dekho ek neta ka lahu
Ab toh mera bhi guzara hai inhi ke khoon par
Kya bataoon mai ke isme zaiqa hai kis qadar
Unka khoon pikar bahot maqmoor hojati hoon Mai
Aam jonko ke ghamo se door ho jati hoon Mai
Mu lagte hi unhe chalaak hojati hoon Mai
Be-zarurat hi sahi be-bak hojati hoon mai
Unki har shiryaan hoti hai khazana khoon ka
Ek ek neta hai goya karkhana khoon ka
Kis qadar Khush zaiqa hota hai un sab ka lahu
Bhooki janta ka lahu bhi kuch lahu hai, aakh! Thoo!
Ek bhi khatrra kisi Neta ka Jo paa jayega
Usko janta ke lahu ka bhi maza aajayega!!

Translation:

One day some bugs asked a leech
Aunty what alternative do you suggest
So that instead of blood we could have something else
That would keep us away from the humans
Because now very little blood flows in his veins
Neither can we suck nor lick
We can hardly find any blood in them
Even if it is, it is so tasteless
Who knows what man has begun to eat
What adulterated food is he taking
What we drink cannot be called blood
Because, we can’t make out even its color
It’s rather white than red
It is more like milk than blood
There was a time we drank rivers of blood
Today we suck for hours just for a pint
What to say aunty our thirst doesn’t quench at all
In fact, earlier the blood was not so dear.
Now there is no blood even in the veins of the damsels
In their gathering indeed there is no cup-bearer
Earlier their blood was like wine
That used to fill veins with sweet smell like roses blooming in garden
The moment we sucked them we felt younger again
Our restlessness took a new turn in our body
Its fragrance used to take us into trance
And we used to kiss madly our mate-bugs in ecstasy
Nowadays those youngsters have also become tasteless
In whose veins used to flow a stream of gold
Sucking them we used to get excited
And used to be enraptured by a mere kiss
Now we fall ill sucking them
We become withered, Shrunk and rotten
How far shall we describe about our sorrows
Some days ago it so happened
Foul smell had burst out from our body
For we had sucked, by chance, the blood of a hippy
What to say what the hell is in their blood
It’s more poisonous than tick twenty
Man has been losing all his flavors
Oh! How much tasteless has he become
When the woeful story of the thirsty bugs was over
The leech opened out with its bleeding mouth
Till today you have been sucking the blood of the people
Now try a little the blood of a leader
Now I too live on their blood
Oh! I can’t say how tasty it is
It makes me intoxicated
And keeps me away from the common leeches.
The moment I touch them with my mouth I become shrewd
And uncalled for, I become dauntless
Every vein of theirs is a pool of blood
Verily every leader is its factory
Oh! How tasty is their blood
Is the blood of the starving poor any blood, pooh?
He who could suck the blood of a leader
Would as well savour people’s blood

=== Poetry ===
Dileep Kumar and Saira Banu in the audience

Classical poetry, at that time was entirely in Persian. Eager to learn Persian, Khundmiri assisted with household chores for an elderly Persian teacher in return for lessons. Many of his poems were published in newspapers of Hyderabad such as Munsif, Saisat, Deccan Chronicle and Times of India. In the 1970s and 80s, he was also invited in many Urdu mushairas and Sham-e-qhazals on Doordarshan. As he grew older, Khundmiri started participating in Urdu poetry competitions and forums and quickly rose to be one of the most acclaimed poets of Zinda Dalaan-E Hyderabad. Many celebrities such as Zail Singh, Dileep Kumar, Ajit Kumar, Kaifi Azmi and many other celebrities have attended his Mushairas.

As a poet, Khundmiri was recognized on the international level, attending and receiving recognition at several mushairas.

He was also one of the eminent participants and general secretary of World Humor Conference held in February 1985 at Lal Bahadur stadium, Hyderabad. His poetry has been compared to that of the legendary poet, Mirza Ghalib.

=== Architect ===
Khundmiri began his career as an architect in BHEL from 1964 to 1976. He started his own firm called S.M Associates at King Kothi, Hyderabad in 1976 and designed over 500 masjids around the world. Since he was a modest and genuine man he never showed off his work.

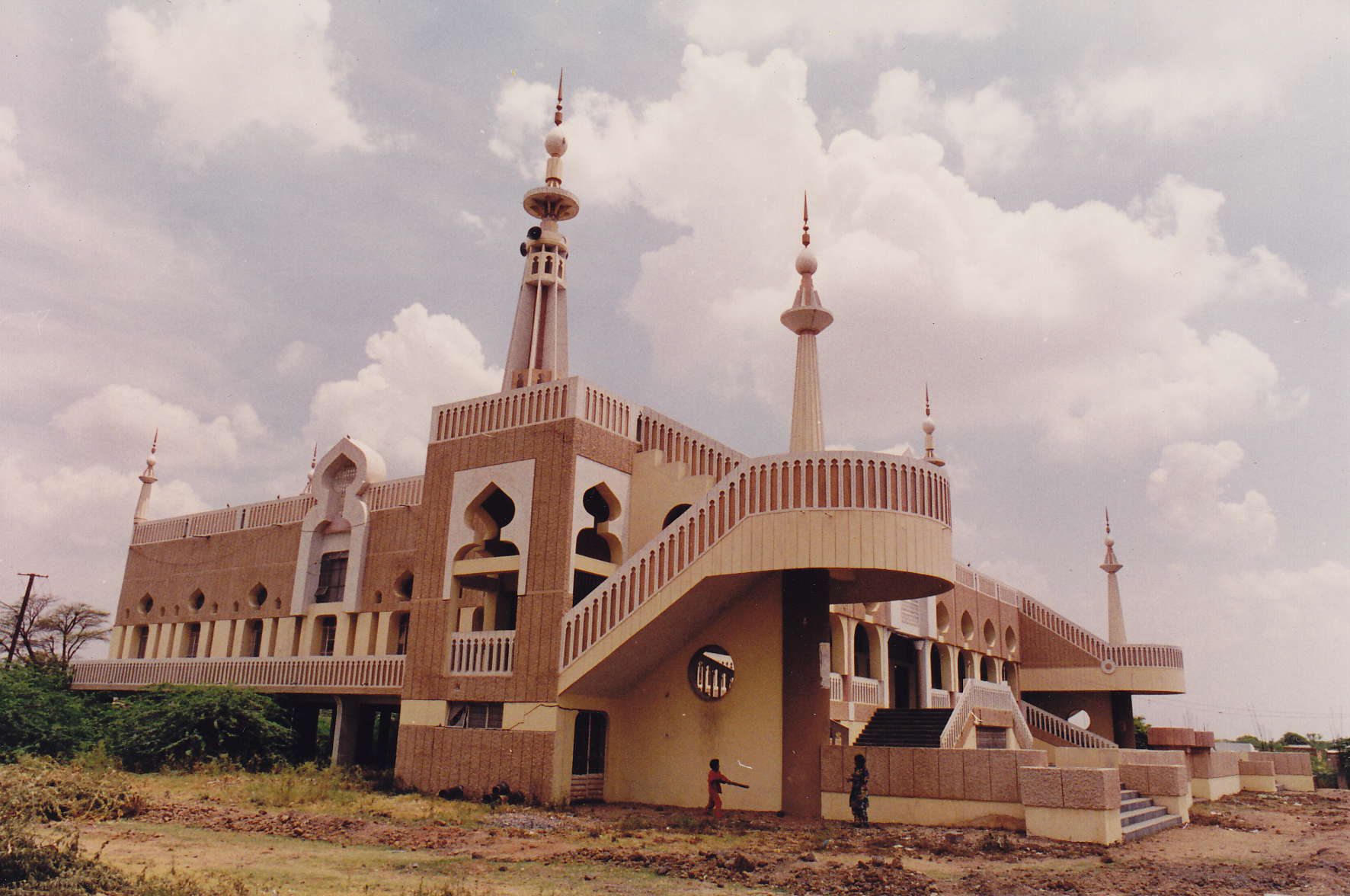
One of Talib Khundmiri's design Masjid-e-Hassa, located at Hafiz Babanagar Hyderabad.

He never profited from his designs as he considered this to be religious philanthropy. He never advertised his work or put any kind of holding with his name on it, on any project. Apart from religious designs, he designed high rises, commercial buildings, hospitals and family homes. His architectural marvels have been compared to that of Mimar Sinan.

=== Artist ===
His artistic talent combined architectural abilities with his ability to connect with people thru his poetry. He has made hundreds of paintings and calligraphies thru his life. Many of his artworks were bought by Muslim families when they were exhibited in Chicago. He also designed many title covers for books for other writers. Parvez Yadullah Mehdi's book cover page is one of the example of his design.

=== Tribute ===
The Standing Committee of the Greater Hyderabad Municipal Corporation has approved the proposal submitted by Malakpet MLA Ahmed Bin Abdullah Balala, of renaming the Chanchalguda-Malakpet road as "Talib Khundmiri road" to give him a tribute. Hz. Talib Khundmiri Sahab touched many in a positive way through his poetry, calligraphy and his architecture. With humor he brought us together and through his designs allowed us to experience art and culture.

== See also ==
- List of Urdu poets
- Chanchalguda
- Kaifi Azmi
- Urdu literature
- Urdu poetry
- List of Indian poets
- List of poets

== Articles on Talib Khundmiri ==
- Talib Khundmiri: Humorous poet Talib Khundmiri passes away - Wajid, The Saisat Urdu News paper, Monday, 17 Jan 2011.
- Talib Khundmiri: A tribute paid to Talib Khundmiri - By Dr Mujahid Ghazi, Pakistan Link, Chicago, Monday, Jan 17 2011.
