= Aditi Rao =

Indian activist, essayist and poet

- Education: Sarah Lawrence College, Soka University of America
- Notable work: The Fingers Remember
- Awards: Srinivas Rayaprol Poetry Prize, Toto Funds the Arts Award, Muse India-Satish Verma Young Writer Award

Aditi Rai is an Indian activist, essayist and published poet. Her poems have been published in national and international journals and she has won several writing awards. She currently lives in New Delhi.

== Education ==
Aditi holds a MFA degree in Creative Writing from Sarah Lawrence College (New York) and a Bachelors' in Liberal Arts from Soka University of America.

== Writing career ==
Her short stories have been published in the Earth Charter's book Images of Connection and the Peace Portal's book People Building Peace 2.0. An intrepid traveller, her writing reflects the time she spent in India, Argentina, Mexico and the United States.

In 2013 she published prose-poem "Dear Mr Yadav, I too am an Indian Woman" in The Feminist Wire as a response to Indian politician Lalu Prasad Yadav's comments on the Delhi Slut Walk.

Her first book "The Fingers Remember" (Yoda Press) was published in 2015.

== Awards ==
In 2011 Aditi Rao was awarded the Srinivas Rayaprol Poetry Prize. She was awarded the Toto Funds the Arts Award for Creative Writing in English in 2012. In 2015 she was awarded the Muse India-Satish Verma Young Writer Award.
