= Abhimanyu Samanta Singhara =

Bidagdha Kabi Abhimanyu Samanta Singhara
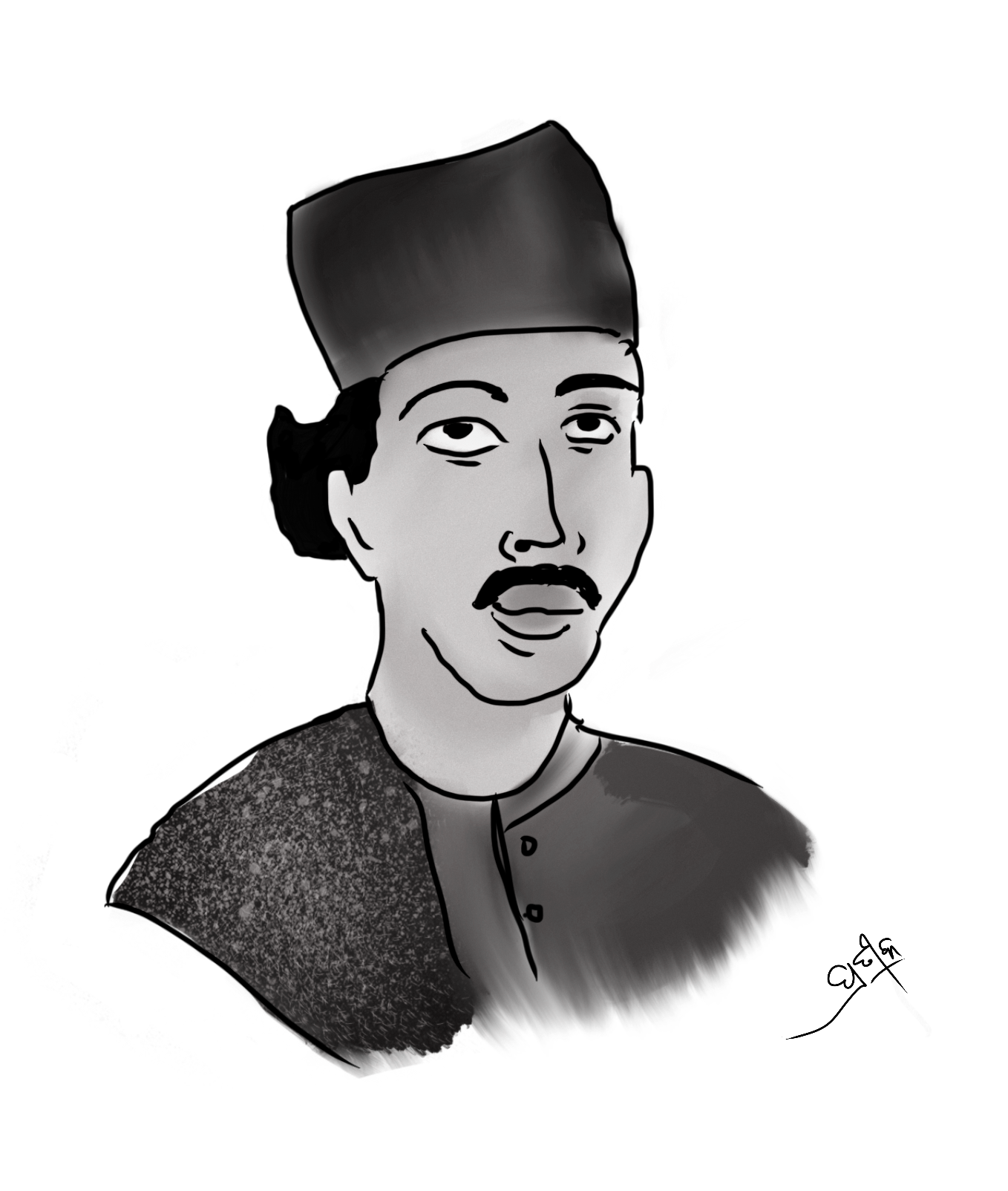
- Drawing of Samanta Singhara
- Born: 23 February 1760 (7th day of Magha); Balia, Jajpur district
- Died: 15 June 1806 (aged 46) (Raja Sankranti)
- Occupation: Poet
- Notable work: Bidagdha Chintamani (kābya)
- Style: Odissi music
- Parent: Indrajita Samanta Singhara

Abhimanyu Samanta Singhara (Odia: [ɔbʱimɔnju saːmɔnt̪ɔsiŋhaːɾɔ]; 23 February 1760 – 15 June 1806) was an 18th-century Odia poet born in Balia, Jajpur best known as the writer of the kabya Bidagdha Chintamani. Abhimanyu was one of the important musician-poets in the tradition of Odissi music in the 18th century, composing mainly in the Chhānda style. He has also written many Odia folk songs like Bagha Gita (tiger song), Chadhei Gita (bird song). He has written many poems about the love between Radha and Krishna.

== Life ==
He was born in Balia village, Jajpur on 23 February 1760. Balia village is situated near famous Buddhist place Ratnagiri Mahavihara of Jajpur. His father Indrajita Samanta Singhara had no child. But it is said that Abhimanyu was born due to the worship of a saint, Sadananda Kabisujrya Brahma. He was the teacher of Abhimanyu. He had written his first poem at the age of 9.

କରମଙ୍ଗା ଗଛ ଛାଇ ଗୋ,

ମୋର ହୁଁ ଗୋ ।
କରମ ଯାହାର ସଫଳ ହୋଇବ,
କୃଷ୍ଣଙ୍କୁ ଲଭିବ ସେହି ଗୋ,

ମୋର ହୁଁ ଗୋ ।

— ଅଭିମନ୍ୟୁ ସାମନ୍ତସିଂହାର

Shadow of Starfruit tree,

You are mine ।
Whose work will be successful,
He will get Krishna,

You are mine ।

— Abhimanyu Samantasinghara

Abhimanyu employs several dozen ragas in his range of works, employing both well-known and rarer ancient ragas of the Odissi music tradition. In his magnum opus Bidagdha Chintamani, he uses several ragas for the 98 chhānda songs, such as Chakrakeli, Chokhi, Chinta Kamodi, Bangalasri, Dhanasri, Rasakulya, Sankarabharana, Kalyana Ahari, Kumbha Kamodi, Bibhasa, Kedara Kamodi, Ahari, Bhairaba, Gouri, Ramakeri, Kali, Ghantaraba, Kalyana, Kanada, Kamodi, Baradi, Malaba, Sindhuda, Kedara Gouda, Saranga, Purbi, Ranabije, Lalita Kamodi, Chalaghanta, Kedara, Rasa Kedara, Soka Kamodi, Jayanta Kala, Bichitra Desakhya, Pahadia Kedara, Patamanjari, Malasri, Dhipa, Bhupala, Asabari, Lalita Kedara, Gujjari, Mukhari, Panchama Baradi, Nalinigouda, Kalahansa Kamodi, Mangala, etc. Following the ancient music of Odisha, Abhimanyu particularly excels in the usage of jugma-ragas, complex ragas formed by the union of two or more ragas, such as Pahadia Kedara, Kalyana Ahari, Bibhasa Kedara, etc.

== Literary works ==
- Bidagdha Chintamani
- Prema (Preeti) Chintamani
- Prema Kala
- Rasabati
- Sulakhyana
- Prema Tarangini
- Bagha Gita
- Chadhei Gita
- Bole Hun

== See also ==
- List of Indian poets
- Odissi music

== External references ==
- History of Odia literature, Mayadhar Manasingh, Publisher: Grantha Mandira
- Prachina Odia Kabita Sambhara, Editor: Jatindra Mohan Mohanty, Publisher: Subarnarekha, Bhubaneswar
- Utkala Lakshmi, Gangadhar Granthabali(Odia), Das Brothers, Cuttack-Berhampur- Sambalpur, 3rd reprint, 1961
- Fakirmohan Senapatinka Atmacharita (Odia), Edited by Debendra Kumar Dash, National Book Trust, New Delhi, Reprint, 2015, pp-58
