= Mohammad Ismail (poet) =

Indian Telugu-language poet (1928 - 2003)

Mohammad Ismail (26 May 1928 – 25 November 2003) is an Indian Telugu-language poet, critic, academic and university administrator.

He was born in Kavali, Nellore district. He completed his education in Kakinada and Waltair. While he was studying at Pithapuram Raja's College at Kakinada, the poet Devulapalli Krishna Sastri was one of his teachers and a neighbor. Ismail considered Krishna Sastry and Rabindranath Tagore his mentors. While at school, he initially became a Marxist and a student activist, but turned away from it. Later influences included Brahmo Samaj, including one of its exponents, Peddada Ramaswamy; the writings of "Tarakam"; Krishna Shastri and Chalam. A philosophy student, he went on to receive a master's degree from Andhra University, then worked as a lecturer in philosophy at Kakinada, Anantapur and Vijayawada. He was also a principal in his alma mater, Pithapuram Raja Government College.

In his thirties, Ismail began writing poetry, and published his poems in the prestigious literary magazines Bharati and Kala keli.

== Style ==
Muhammad 'Ismail's style of writing was contrary to the genre of Marxist literature that was popular during his time. His works were famous for deep imagery and profundity that resulted from Zen like simplicity. He is famously called "Sada balakudu", meaning Eternal child (of poetry).

== Books ==
Ismail wrote more than a dozen books which include poetry, criticism and translations. He wrote with the pen name "Ismail".

=== Poetry ===
- Chettu naa aadarsam (1972)
- Mrityu vriksham (1976)
- Chilakalu vaalina chettu (1980)
- Ratri Vaccina Rahasyapu Vana (1987)
- Baalcheelo Chandrodayam
- Ismail Kavitalu (1989)
- Kappala Nissabdam (haiku) (1997) :
- Rendo Pratipaadana (Translations) :
- Pallelo maa paatha illu (2006)

=== Essays ===
- Kavitvam lo Nissabdam (criticism) (1987)
- Karuna Mukhyam (Essays and criticism)

Of these, Chettu naa aadarsam has been translated to English by D. Kesava Rao as "Tree, My Guru". Rendo Pratipaadana is a collection of poems (from Bengali poets like Sujatha Bhat, Jibananad Das to Western poets like Nicanor Parra) translated by Ismail. Pallelo maa paatha illu is a posthumous publication of Ismail's poetry and his translations of Japanese haiku and tanka poets. Ismail himself was a prominent haiku writer in Telugu. His critical essays in Kavitvam lo Nissabdam have given a new direction to the Telugu poetry.

== Awards ==
- Free verse Front award in 1976 for Mrityu vriksham.
- Telugu University literary criticism award in 1990.

== Other ==
His work has been translated to French and Spanish besides various Indian languages and English. As an appreciation for best poetry in Telugu, Ismail Kavitha Puraskaram is being awarded every year (from 2010) in his honor.

== See also ==
- List of Telugu poets
