= Tirupati Venkata Kavulu =

19th century Indian poet

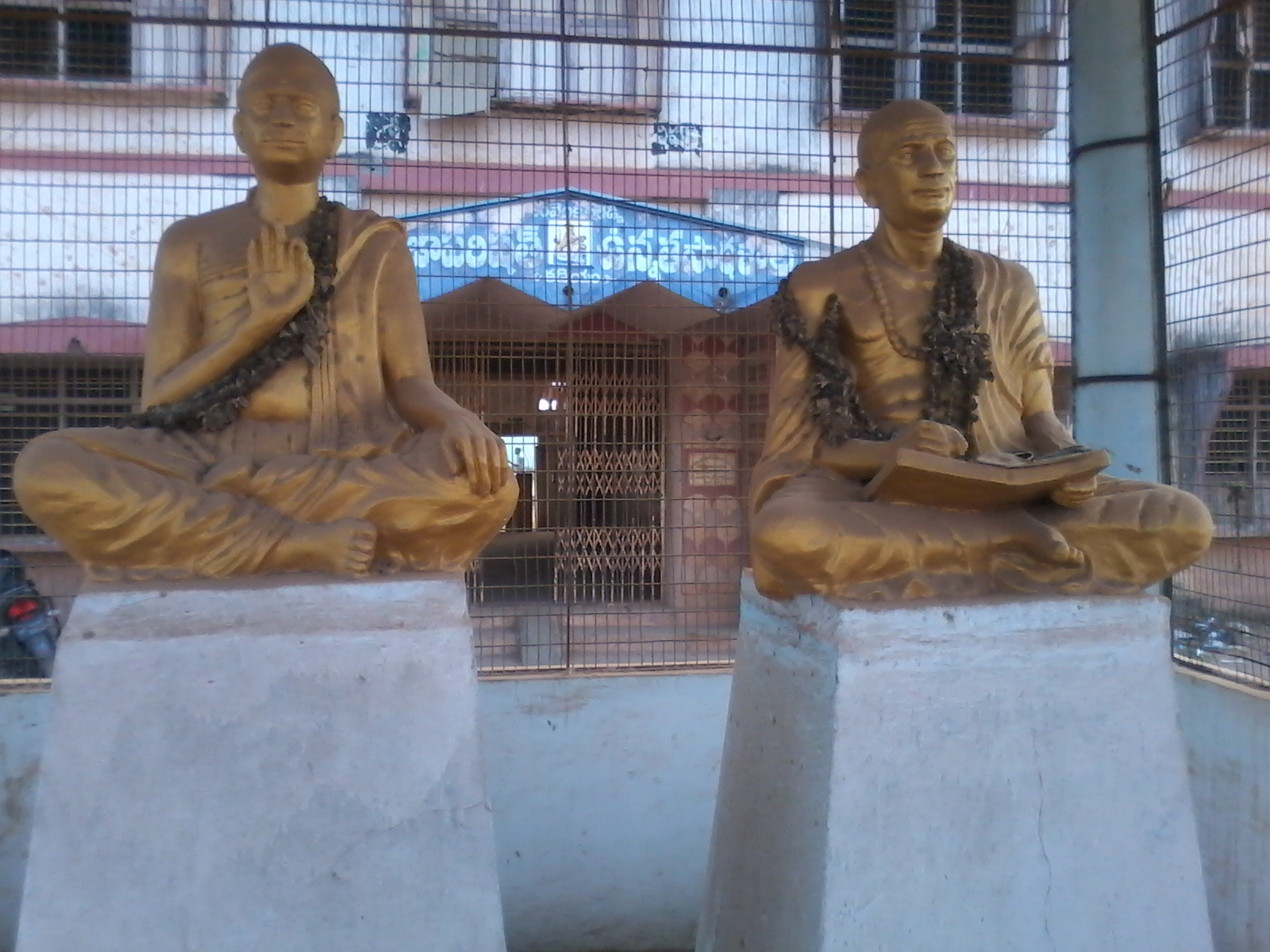
Tirupati Venkata Kavulu

Tirupati Venkata Kavulu (transl. Poets Tirupati & Venkata) refers to the Telugu poet duo Divakarla Tirupati Sastry (1872–1919) and Chellapilla Venkata Sastry (1870–1950). These twin poets are acclaimed as the harbingers of modern poetry in Telugu. They have dramatised several of the Hindu epics into dramas and plays consisting of singable verses set to perfect meter. Several of their plays, especially pandavodyogavijayalu have been extremely popular with many drama clubs and audiences across Andhra Pradesh. Venkata Sastry has trained a large number of later age poets including Viswanatha Satyanarayana, Pingali Lakshmikantam and Veturi.

== Awards ==
- Chellapilla Venkata Sastry was conferred Kala Prapoorna by Andhra University in 1938.

== Literary works ==
=== Original compositions in Sanskrit ===
1. Dhatu Ratnakara Campu (1889–1893) is a campu cavya with the story of Ramayana illustrating the use of verbal forms for the roots given by Pāṇini, the Sanskrit grammarian.

2. Sringara Sringataka (1891) is a small playlet called Veedhi with predominantly erotic sentiment.

3. Kali Sahasram (1891–1894) is incomplete work (300 slokas) modelled on Lakshmi Sahasram in Sanskrit.

4. Mula Sthaneswara Stuti (1893–1894) was composed in Arya vrittas on Mulasthaneswara, local deity of Nellore.

5. Ashtkas (Kalikadi Stotra), 1889–1890

6. Suka-Rambha Samvadam (1893–1894) is an argumentation between Śuka, the sage and Rambha, the danseuse. Suka interprets Ananda, the Supreme Bliss, in terms of Vedantic Truth and Rambha interprets it in terms of erotic experience.

7. Namassivaya Stotram (1914–1915) is a devotional panegyric on Shiva.

8. Kshampanam (1914–1915)

9. Pishtapeshanam (1914–1915)

10. Salabhalabhanam (1914–1915)

=== Translations from Sanskrit to Telugu ===
1. Devi Bhagavatamu, 1896
2. Siva Leelalu, 1896
3. Purana Gadhalu, 1896
4. Vrata Kathalu, 1896
5. Srinivasa Vilasamu, 1896–1897
6. Rasikanandamu, 1893–1894
7. Suka-Rambha Samvadamu (1893–1894) is translation into Telugu from the poets' own work of the same name in Sanskrit.
8. Buddha Caritramu, 1899–1900
9. Vairagya Sataka of Appaya Dikshita, 1899–1900
10. Bala Ramayana of Rajasekhara, 1901–1912
11. Mudra Rakshasa of Vishakhadatta, 1901–1912
12. Mrichchakatika of Shudraka, 1901–1912
13. Vikramankadeva Caritra of Bilhana, 1901–1912
14. Candraprabha Caritra of Veera Nandi, 1901–1912
15. Harsha Caritra of Bana, 1901–1912

=== Translations from English to Telugu ===
1. Stories of Rabindranath Tagore

=== Original works in Telugu poetry ===
1. Sravananandam (1893–1897; 1897–1898)
2. Panigrihita
3. Lakshana Parinayamu (1897–1901) was a mythological work which describes the marriage of Krishna and Lakshana.
4. Ela Mahatmyamu (1898–1900) was a work on the sanctity of River Ela.
5. Jataka Carya (1899–1930) and Iteevali Carya (1930–1950) are two unique works by Venkata Sastry. It is somewhat autobiographical work based on jyotishaphala. He has recorded his life in verse form. First work described his life from 30th to 60th year and the second work almost to the end of his life.
6. Divakarastamayamu (1920) is an elegy by Venkata Sastry on the demise of his lifelong partner, Tirupati Sastry.
7. George V Pattabhisheka Padyalu (1912) were composed on the occasion of the coronation of King George V.
8. Bobbili Pattabhisheka Kavyamu (1929) was a descriptive poem pertaining to the coronation of the Maharajah of Bobbili.
9. Kameswari Satakamu (1901)
10. Arogya Kameswari Stuti (1922)
11. Arogya Bhaskara Stavamu (1929–1930)
12. Mrtyunjaya Stavamu
13. Saubhagya Kameshwari Stavamu (1938–1941)
14. Sita Stavamu
15. Siva Bhakti
16. Go-Devi was work on dialogue between a cow and a tiger.
17. Pativrata was a kavya based on a folk song wherein a young woman is married to a snake.
18. Suseela is a work dealing with social customs like divine dispensation.
19. Poorva Hariscandra Caritramu is a mythological work.
20. Daiva Tantramu
21. Satee Smriti was an elegy by Venkata Sastry on the demise of his wife.
22. Krishna Niryanamu (1918) was an elegy on the demise of the Raja of Polavaram.
23. Suryanarayana Stuti (1920) was composed by Tirupati Sastry when he was seriously ill before his demise.
24. Polavaram Rajah gari Sani Mahadasa (1918) is a deprecation of someone who had brought misfortune to the Rajah of Polavaram, his benefactor.
25. Sukha Jeevi is a panegyric describing the qualities of Edara Venkata Rao Pantulu.

=== Original works in Telugu drama ===
1. Panditarajamu
2. Edward Pattabhisheka Natakamu
3. Pandava Jananamu (1901–1917)
4. Pandava Pravasamu
5. Pandava Rajasuyamu
6. Pandava Udyogamu
7. Pandava Vijayamu
8. Pandava Aswamedhamu
9. Anargha Naradamu
10. Dambha Vamanamu
11. Sukanya
12. Prabhavatee-Pradyumnamu (1920–1922)
13. Gajanana Vijayamu (1901–1912)

=== Original works in Telugu prose ===
1. Bharata Veerulu
2. Vikrama Cellapillamu
3. Shastipoorti
4. Satee Jatakamu
