= Amol Redij =

Indian poet and writer (born 1977)

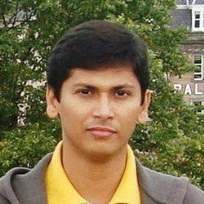
- Born: 18 September 1977 (age 49); Bombay, India
- Education: Bachelor of Engineering
- Alma mater: University of Pune
- Occupations: Author, Poet
- Spouse: Jaya N.
- Writing career
- Language: English, Marathi, Hindi
- Genres: Poetry, fiction
- Notable awards: Author Achiever Award, Literoma Awards (2021)
- Website: www.amolr.info

Amol Redij (born 18 September 1977) is author, poet, and creative content designer from Maharashtra, India. He was awarded Literoma Author Achiever Award 2021.

== Education ==
Amol Redij grew up in Mumbai and went to St. Paul High School. He completed his schooling from Gokuldham High School (1984–1993) and higher secondary college from M. V & L. U. College (1993–1995). Later Amol went on to complete his Bachelor's in Engineering with Electronics from University of Pune in 1999. Amol holds several industry recognized certifications in Information Technology domains. He began his career as a Website Developer and has successfully emerged as an Information Design & Development expert.

== Personal life ==
Amol was born on 18 September 1977 in suburban area of Parel, Mumbai. He grew up in a middle class Maharashtrian family. His father worked as a textile mill worker with New China Mills in Sewri and his mother was a homemaker. Amol is maternal cousin of Rajesh Deshpande, a noted Marathi playwright and filmmaker.

== Literary Accomplishments ==
Amol was awarded the Literoma Author Achiever Award in 2021 for his contribution to poetry and creative writing.

Continuing his fervor for writing, Amol published his first collection of poetry Silent Moments of Melancholy in 2011. In 2014, his second book of poetry 69: The OtherWise Poetry comprising 69 poems was published. After a long interlude, Amol's third collection of poetry, "Acathexis: A Detached Void" will be published in 2022.

Amol's poems have been published in several international magazines and forums. He is among the distinguished poets across the globe to be included in "Otherwise Engaged Literature and Arts Journal" in 2021. Amol also ranks in elite poets published in the "Dance of the Peacock", an Indo-English Poetry Anthology released by Hidden Brook Press, Canada. Amol's poetry has featured in "Creative Flight", and international online magazine. "Labarin", an African magazine published Amol's 5 poems that were critically acclaimed for its painstaking approach. His poems were published in "The Bruised Peach Press", a US-based literary magazine. His poem "Ecstasy" was published in the Jan 2013 edition of the magazine, "The Brooklyn Voice". Amol's poetry is regularly featured on "Destiny Poets", a UK based poetry forum.

Amol Redij is known to have made significant contribution in collaboratively shaping up the content for the book "Why You Must Know This Man?: The Life and Times of Amit Dutta-Gupta" from a creative and editorial perspective. Amol considers this as a remarkable oeuvre among his writing achievements.

To persuade his keen liking for film making, Amol has been involved in making short films with film enthusiast groups. He has supplemented his creative aspirations in film making by being an assistant director, production manager, and script supervisor for some of the award-winning short films. "Ardhaviram", a Marathi short film made in 2015 was his first film as an assistant director and production manager. The film won the Best Film award at the PCMC Film Festival and was an Official Selection at the Pune Short Film Festival. In 2016, Amol got involved in his second Marathi short film, "Return Gift", as an assistant director and Script Supervisor. The short film made it to the Official Selection for the Toronto International Short Film Festival and also won the Best Story award at the Goa Film Festival. He then worked principally as a Co-Script Writer and Dialog Writer for another film, "Dhuaa" in 2016, and as a Production Manager as well for the same film.

Amol has scripted a full-length Marathi play, "As Good As It Gets" in 2010.

== Bibliography ==
=== Poetry ===
- Silent Moments of Melancholy (2011)
- 69: The OtherWise Poetry (2014)
- Acathexis: A Detached Void (2022)
- Otherwise Engaged Literature and Arts Journal (2021)
- Departure (Festival for Poetry, 2021)
- Life: A Summary (Creative Flight, 2019)
- The Almighty Kidnapper (Labarin, 2017)
- Sepia (Labarin, 2017)
- Victim (Labarin, 2017)
- Garland (Labarin, 2017)
- Ecstasy (The Brooklyn Voice, 2013)
- Home (Destiny Poets – UK, 2012)
- Bruised Memories (The Bruised Peach Press, 2011)

=== Fiction ===
- Headburst (2023)
- Sandcastle and Other Short Stories (2023)

=== Non-fiction ===
- Why You Must Know This Man?: The Life and Times of Amit Dutta-Gupta (2014)

== Films and related work ==
- Ardhaviram] (2015, assistant director, & production manager)
- Return Gift (2016, assistant director, & script supervisor)
- Dhuaa (2016, co-script writer, dialog writer, & production manager)
- As Good As It Gets (2010, Writer)

== See also ==
- List of Indian poets
