= Tushar Jain =

Indian poet, playwright, writer and translator

Tushar Jain is an Indian poet, playwright, writer and translator. He was the winner of the Srinivas Rayaprol Poetry Prize, 2012 and won second place in the Poetry with Prakriti Prize, 2013.

== Career ==
Subsequently, he won the RL Poetry Award, 2014. He was a winner of the DWL Short Story Contest 2014 for his short story "A humiliating day for [Dr.] Balachander" and was nominated further for the Dastaan Award, 2014. He won the Toto Funds the Arts Award for Creative Writing, 2016. His first play "Reading Kafka in Verona" was long-listed for the Hindu Metroplus Playwright Award, 2013.

His work has been published in various international journals and other forums such as Antiserious, thenervousbreakdown, rlpoetry.org, and papercuts.

He is currently working on children's popular fiction.
