= Rafiq Husain =

Syed Rafiq Husain سید رفیق حسین
- Born: 14 May 1913; Allahabad, United Provinces of Agra and Oudh, British India
- Died: 31 December 1990 (aged 77); Allahabad, Uttar Pradesh, India
- Education: Allahabad University
- Occupations: Writer, poet, critic
- Spouse: Husnara Begum
- Writing career
- Genre: Fiction
- Subjects: Literature, Urdu, Psychology
- Literary movement: Urdu literature

Rafiq Husain (Urdu: رفیق حسین) born Syed Rafiq Husain (14 May 1913 – 31 December 1990) was an Urdu writer, poet and critic from India.

== Career ==
He served as Registrar of Co-Operative Society. On completion of his postgraduate studies, he joined Allahabad University as lecturer on the persecution of the Vice Chancellor Amarnath Jha of Allahabad University. Later he became Chairman of Allahabad University Delegacy and Head of the Urdu Department. A competition occurred between Rafique Hussain and Firdaus Fatima Naseer for the Professorship in Urdu.

== Bibliography ==
- Urdu Ghazal aur unski Nash-vo-Numa, 1942
- Mir Hasan ki hayat aur Siberian ka tanvi jaisa h, 1960
- Dabistan, 1964,
- Gujrat, 1966
- Afsanvi uṣul aur fasanah-yi ajaib, 1975
- Mas navi Siḥr al-bayan: yaʻnī, Qiṣṣah-yi Be Naẓīr va Badr-i Munīr, 1978
- Azmat-e-Marasi
- Pahli Tankid Pahla Naqad
- Mawazna Anis wa Dabir
- Masnawi Gulzar Naseem by Pt Daya Shankar "Naseem" with an introduction and notes by Rafiq Husain

== See also ==
- List of Indian poets
- List of Indian writers
