= Jwalamukhi (poet) =

Indian poet, writer and political activist

- Born: Veeravalli Raghavacharyulu; 18 April 1938; Sitarambagh, Hyderabad, Telangana
- Died: 14 December 2008 (aged 70); Somajiguda, Telangana, India
- Occupations: Poet, political activist
- Spouse: Sitadevi
- Children: Sampath Kumar, Sridhar and Vasu

Jwalamukhi was the pen name of Veeravalli Raghavacharyulu (18 April 1938 – 14 December 2008), who was an Indian poet, novelist, writer and political activist.

== Life ==
Jwalamukhi won the Sahitya Akademi Award (Hindi) for his novel Rangeya Raghava Life History. Among the other more prominent of his novels and thousands of poems were Veladina Mandaram, Hyderabad Kathalu and Votami-Tirugubatu.

Jwalamukhi was a member of the "Digambara Kavulu", a group of poets whose views and style is recognised as a decisive break in the history of modern Telugu literature. He was also a co-founder of the Revolutionary Writers Association (Virasam) in 1970, an active member of the Organisation for People's Democratic Rights and a founder of the India-China Friendship Association. He was the Andhra Pradesh secretary and national vice president of the India-China Friendship Association until his death.

He was born in the Sitarambagh section of Hyderabad. He founded Sitarambagh Residents Welfare Association and opposed Laxmi Nivas Ganeriwal. After the foundation of Virasam in 1970, Jwalamukhi was arrested in 1971 for his writings along with two other Virasam members under the AP Preventive Detention Act. One of his poems was proscribed under Section 99 of the Code of Criminal Proceedings, and all copies of the book in which it appeared were seized.

"An electrifying speaker, Jwalamukhi travelled extensively and lectured across the state Andhra Pradesh and beyond for decades", according to an article in The Hindu. "He was associated with nearly every major social movement in Andhra Pradesh for well over three decades."

He died at a corporate hospital at Somajiguda on 14 December 2008, from a heart attack while receiving treatment for liver cirrhosis, from which he suffered for the previous year. He was survived by his wife, Sita Devi, and sons Sampath Kumar, Sridhar and Vasu.
