= Shahzad A. Rizvi =

American poet

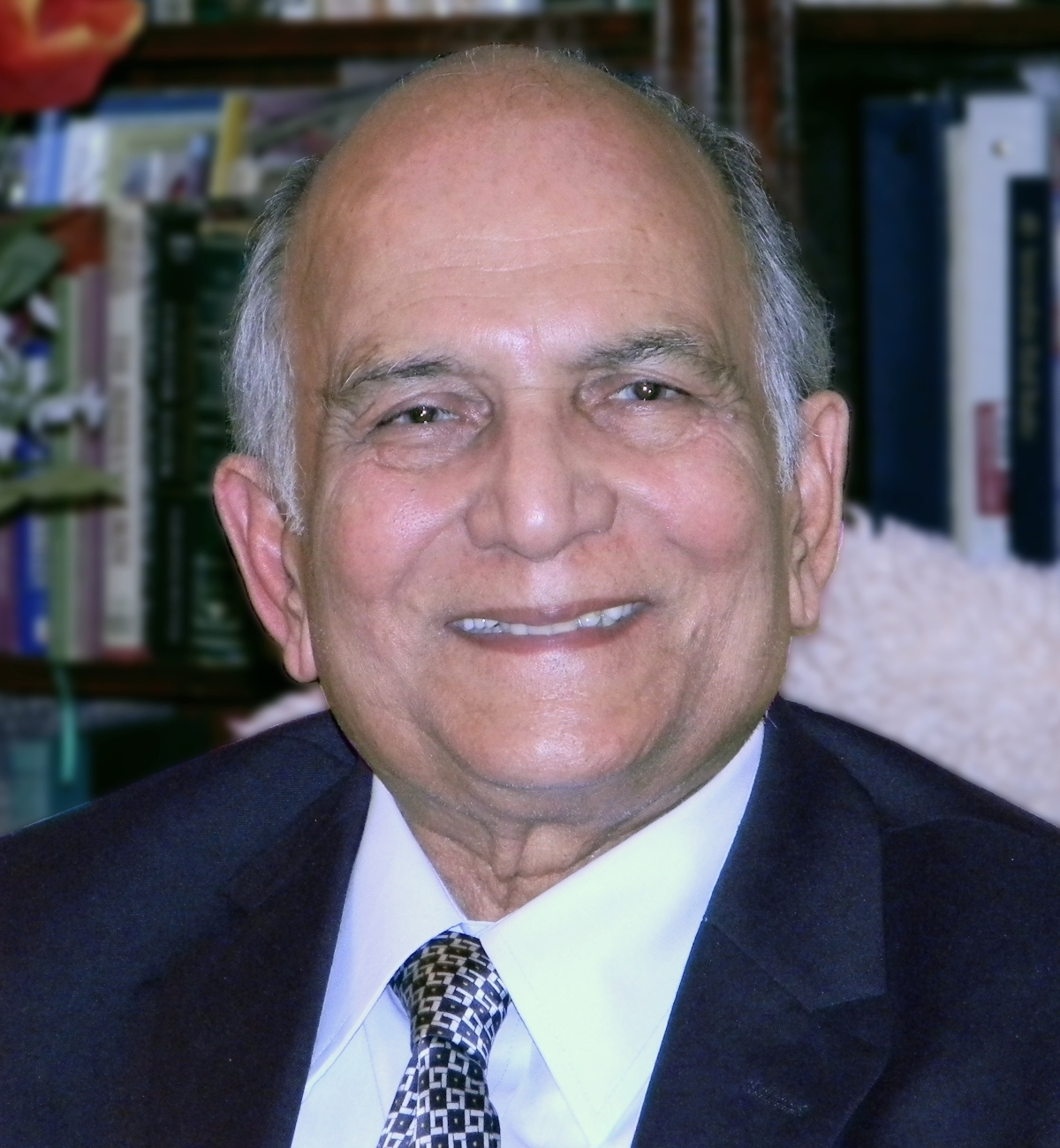
Portrait of Dr. Shahzad A. Rizvi, novelist, poet and scholar. Photographed in his study Sunday, 13 January 2013.

Dr. Shahzad A. Rizvi Ph.D. (born 28 February 1937) is an Indian-born American author, scholar and Urdu poet. His English language works include historical novels set in India and scholarly articles on Urdu literary figures. His Urdu language works include numerous poems and ghazals.

Dr. Rizvi was born in 1937 in Gwalior, India and currently lives in the United States. He is a descendant of Fazl-e-Haq Khairabadi, a prominent Indian scholar and freedom fighter in the Indian Rebellion of 1857, and grandson of the renowned Urdu poet Muztar Khairabadi.

Together with other contemporary Urdu poets, Dr. Rizvi has participated in international poetic recitations hosted by Urdu literary societies in the United States and India (at the Ghalib Institute in Delhi and the Urdu Academy in Bhopal). In 2014, Halqa-e-Arbab-e-Adab Press of Bhopal, India published two collections of Dr. Rizvi's Urdu poetry, "Chalte, Chalte" (On the Way) and "Khwab Zindagi Ke" (Life's Dream).

Indian publisher Urdu Literary Circle released a third collection of Rizvi's Urdu poetry in March 2015, entitled "Muhabbaton Ka Safar" (Love's Journey). Noted Urdu scholar and literary critic, Professor Afaq Ahmed, arranged and edited the collection. On 2 April 2015, Professor Ahmed hosted a literary function at the historic Swaraj Bhavan mansion and museum to celebrate the publication. Guest of honor Dr. Mohammad Zaman Azurda, former Head of the Department of Urdu at Jammu University, introduced Rizvi's newest collection to the gathering of poets and literary scholars.
