= Sanwar Daiya =

Indian writer and translator in Rajasthani and Hindi (1948–1992)

- Born: 10 October 1948; Bikaner, Rajasthan
- Died: 30 July 1992 (aged 43); Bikaner, Rajasthan
- Occupations: writer, Poet, scholar, philosopher and cultural critic
- Spouse: Santi Devi
- Children: Neeraj, Rajesh
- Writing career
- Period: 1948-1998
- Genres: fiction, poetry, Satire, critic
- Subject: socialist
- Website: www.sanwardaiya.blogspot.com

Sanwar Daiya was a well-known Modern Rajasthani writer and translator in Rajasthani and Hindi. He received Sahitya Akademi Award in 1985 for "Ek Duniya Mahari"(Collection of Rajasthani short-story). He served for many literary institutes of national.

== Works ==
He wrote Man-gat, Kal ar Aaj re Bichchai, Huve Rang Hajar, Akhar Ri Aankh Soon and short stories collections including Ek Duniya Mahari, Asawade Paswade, Ek Hi Jilad me, Dharti Kad Tani Dhumeli. His collection of Rajasthani short-story, Ek Duniya Mahari received the Sahitya Akademi Award 1985.

He translated Anil Joshi’ Stechyoo in Rajasthani.

== Awards ==
He was awarded by Sahitya Akademi, Delhi for his "Ek Duniya mahri" in 1985. He was awarded with Ganeshilal Vyas ‘Ustad’ Padhya Puraskar and Dr. L P Tessitory Gadhya Puruskar.
