= L. S. Kandasamy =

Indian writer

L S Kandasamy
- Born: 24 December 1939; Lakapuram, Rasipuram, Tamil Nadu, India
- Died: 6 April 1992 (aged 52); Coimbatore, Tamil Nadu, India
- Occupation: Professor

L S Kandasamy (1939–1992) was a Tamil teacher and writer. He was born in Lakkapuram near Rasipuram and did his masters in Tamil at Madras University.

== Early life ==
Dr. L S Kandasamy began his career as a school teacher and in 1972 joined Tamil Nadu Agricultural University. While serving as the head of the department, he also served as editor for Valarum Vellanmai a journal targeted to educate the farmer community. This journal focused on communicating technology and science development in agriculture. Dr. L S Kandasamy who is an agriculturalist himself and literati was instrumental in interpreting information in science to a practical solution for the farmer community. He wrote many novels, modern poetry, self-improvement and agriculture. In 1989 he started Thannambikkai, a monthly magazine with an emphasis on self-improvement. Thannambikkai is now published by his family and friends.
