= Anandabharati Aiyangar =

Indian Tamil-language poet and dramatist

Anandabharati Iyengar
- Born: Anandabharati Srinivasa Iyengar; 1786; Umayalpuram, Thanjavur district, Tamil Nadu
- Died: 1846 (aged 59–60)
- Occupations: poet, playwright

Anandabharati Aiyangar (1786–1846) was an Indian Tamil-language poet and dramatist.

== Personal life ==
Anandabharati was born in 1786 at Umeiyammalpuram near Thanjavur. He was the son of a wealthy mirasdar (landlord) named Srinivasa Aiyangar. At the age of thirteen, he composed a drama named Nondi in praise of Yaneimelazhagar, the patron deity of his village. Soon afterwards, he migrated, along with his father, to Thiruvallur, where he lived for three years. From the age of fifteen, he was successively employed as the karnam and Samprathi of two different temples in Thanjavur. At the age of twenty-five, he resigned his job and settled down at Tiruvidaimarudur where he spent the rest of his life writing poems. Aiyarappa Tambiran, the dharmakarta of the shrine at Tiruvidaimarudur was so pleased at a drama written by him in praise of the presiding deity that he honored him with the gift of a house and garden, and conferred on him the title of Kavirajaswami. Anandabharati Aiyangar died in 1846 at the age of sixty.

== Poetic compositions ==
Some of his famous poetical compositions are Uttara Ramayana Kirtana, Desikaprabandham, Bagavata Dasamaskanda Nadagam, Marudur Venba and Muppattirattu.

He also composed hymns in honor of the Saivite shrines at Tiruchirapalli, Tirukadanthai and Thiruvaduthurai.
