= Chellapilla Venkata Sastry =

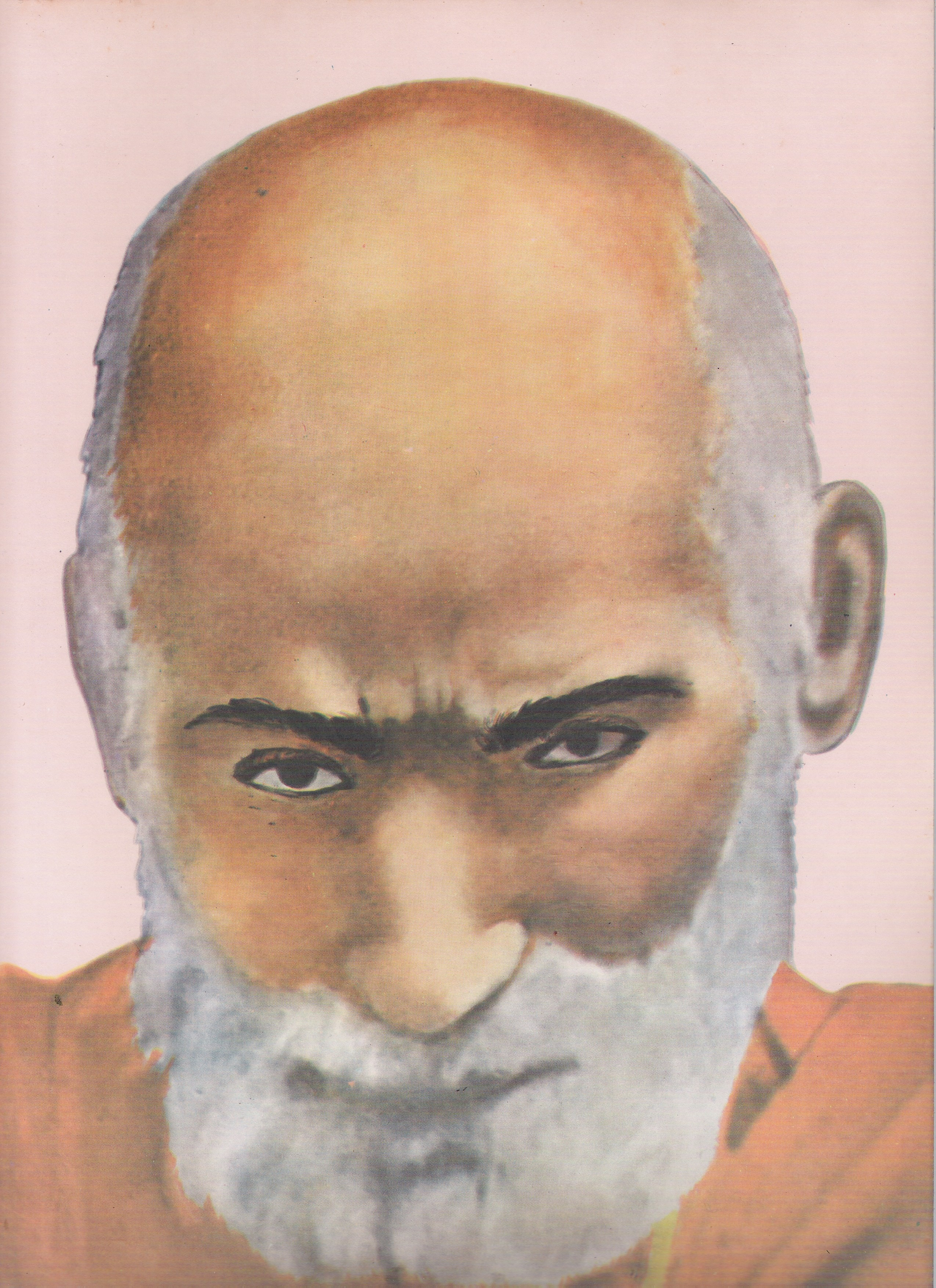
- Born: 1870
- Died: 1950 (aged 80)
- Occupation: Poet
- Writing career
- Language: Telugu

Chellapilla Venkata Sastry (born 8 August 1870) was a Telugu language poet laureate and scholar. He was one of the two poets known as Tirupati Venkata Kavulu and other being Divakarla Tirupati Sastry.

== Early life ==
Chellapilla Venkata Sastry was born in a Dravida Brahmin family on 8 August 1870 to Chandramma and Kamayya at Kadiyam village near Rajahmundry, East Godavari, Andhra Pradesh, India. After finishing a formal school education in various subjects including music, French and literature specializing in the great poet Bharavi's works like "kirataArjuneyam" at the age of 18, Chellapilla moved to Dharmavaram to get formal training in "Siddantha Kaumudi" (branch of Sanskrit grammar) under Brahma Sri Charla Brammayya Sastri. It was under Sri Brahmayya Sastri's tutelage, Chellapilla met his future partner in poetry Sri Divakarla Tirupati Sastry

== Life ==
There was a priceless library of palm leaf books at home collected by this poet. They were shifted to Yanam where he studied Telugu, English and Sanskrit. He studied under Kanukurthi Bhujanga Rao and Allamraju Subrahmanya Kaviraju. At the age of 19, Chellapilla along with his friend Kandukuri Krishna Sastry made a remarkable journey to Benaras ( Kasi ) to study "Vyakaranam"/ Sanskrit Grammar. Experiences from their journey and their struggles in Kasi as poor Telugu students were described in his book Kasi Yatra.
