= Syed Hasnain Raza Naqvi =

Syed Hasnain Raza Naqvi is an Urdu language poet from India.
