= Rajkumar Shitaljit Singh =

Indian writer (1913–2008)

Shitaljit Singh Rajkumar
- Born: 18 August 1913
- Died: 8 June 2008 (aged 94); Keishamthong Top Leirak, Imphal
- Awards: President's Medal for teaching Manipur Journalist Award; Thoibi Devi Award for literature Writer of the Year – 2000; Manipur Journalist Award

Shitaljit Singh Rajkumar, also known as "Rajkumar Shitaljit Singh" or "RK Shitaljit", was a noted writer, scholar and educationalist of Manipur. He was born on 18 August 1913, and died at the age of 95 at his residence at Keishamthong Top Leirak, Imphal on 8 June 2008.

== Profession ==
RK Shitaljit was a teacher and Headmaster of Ram Lal Paul High School, Imphal. Besides being a dedicated teacher and a noted writer, he was also a correspondent of the Amitra Bazar Patrika, The Statesman and Press Trust of India. He was the editor of a Manipuri newspaper the 'Manipur Matam' published by Tarun Press in 1937.

== Awards ==
Shitaljit Singh Rajkumar had received many awards including the President of India's Medal for teaching (1967), the Thoibi Devi Award for literature (from Manipuri Sahitya Parishad, 1999) and the Writer of the Year award (from Naharol Sahitya Premi Samiti, 2000). Recognising his contribution to Manipuri literature, Manipur Sahitya Parishad honoured him with Sahitya Ratna in 2006. He received the Manipur Journalist Award in 1995 and was offered a fellowship by Manipur State Kala Akademi in the same year.

== Books ==
Some of the books he translated from Bengali to Manipuri language are the Gita Govinda and Padavali gi Shayan Shaikhan. In 1988, Swamy Prabhupada's "Bhagavad-gita As It Is" was translated into Manipuri by RK Shitaljit. He has also authored the Friends' English to Manipuri dictionary, 1962 and Friends' Pocket Dictionary (English-Manipuri), 1967.

== Manipuri literature contributions ==
He has written many poems and short stories in Manipuri, which are an important constituent of Manipuri literature. He wrote a book of short stories called Leikolnungda (In the Garden) in 1946, a year before the India's independence. In the same year, he also published another collection of short stories called Leinungshi (Fragrance) and thus began a new era of short stories. Shitaljit can be credited as the father of Manipuri short stories. His short story (a) Kamala Kamala is included in the Civil Service Exam Syllabus for Indian Administrative Service (IAS) Main Exam – Manipuri, (b) Inthokpa in Central Board of Secondary Education syllabus for class IX Manipuri, (c) Ima in Guwahati University TDC Manipuri course and so on.
