= Divakarla Tirupati Sastry =

- Born: 26 March 1872
- Occupation: Poet
- Writing career
- Language: Telugu

Divakarla Tirupati Sastry (born 26 March 1872) was a Telugu poet and scholar. He was one of the two poets known as Tirupati Venkata Kavulu and other being Chellapilla Venkata Sastry.
