= Shivadasa Sen =

15th-century Indian Gaura brahmin Vaishnavite Tattawa-candrika writer from Bengal

- শিবদাস সেন
- Born: Shivadasa Sen; 14th century Gaura, Bengal
- Died: 1474(?)
- Occupations: Writer, Poet, saint
- Writing career
- Language: Sanskrit Bengali
- Genres: Veda, Ayurveda
- Notable work: Tattawa Chandrika:Commentary of Charaka Samhita

Shivadasa Sen (born 14th century) is a mediaeval writer of Sanskrit from Gaura/Bengal, also known as Acharya Shivadasa Sen. He was famous for his commentary on Charaka Samhita. Sivadasa Sen's commentary on Caraka Samhita is known as Tattwa-candrika and was written in 1448 CE. However, only Sutra-s 1-27, are still available today. The manuscript belongs to the Bombay Royal Asiatic Society Library.

There is little information on Sivadasa Sen. From what is available, it is known that he was born (somewhere between 1454 and 1474 AD) in the gaura brahmin guild to Ananta Sen in Malancika, a village in Bengal. Another indication of his birthplace is from his name viz., Sen and that he was a Gaura Vaisnava. Shivadasa Sen has aptly explained the meaning of the word Veda. He says that Veda denotes knowledge which has two forms— Shabdarupa Veda and Artharupa Veda, one is in verbal form and the other is in object form.
