= Sawai Singh Dhamora =

Rajasthani poet and writer

Sawai Singh Dhamora (Sawai Singh Shekhawat; 1926 – September 13, 2017) was a Rajasthani poet and writer. He wrote various Rajasthani books like Peru Prakash, Gandi Gatha, Cittaur̥a ke jauhara va śāke.
