= Srinivas Rayaprol =

Indian poet

- Born: October 25, 1925; Secundarabad, Hyderabad State, British India
- Died: December 7, 1998 (aged 73)
- Education: MS in Civil Engineering
- Alma mater: Nizam College, Banaras Hindu University, Stanford University
- Occupations: Poet, Translator, Engineer
- Parent: Rayaprolu Subba Rao
- Writing career
- Language: English, Telugu

Srinivas Rayaprol (born R.S. Marthandam; October 25, 1925 – December 7, 1998) was an Indian poet who wrote in English. His father was the influential Telugu poet Rayaprolu Subba Rao.

== Works ==
=== Author ===
- Bones and Distances (1968)
- Married Love and Other Poems (1972)
- Selected Poems (1995)

=== Editor ===
- East and West (1956–61)

=== Translator ===
- Perspectives- An Anthology of Telugu Short Stories (2016) ISBN 9789385523779

== Sources ==
- Krätli, Graziano (2018), "Introduction", in Krätli, Graziano (ed.), Why Should I Write a Poem Now : The Letters of Srinivas Rayaprol and William Carlos Williams, 1949-1958, Albuquerque: University of New Mexico Press, pp. 1–28, ISBN 978-0826359971.
