= Quaiser Khalid =

Indian police officer and poet

IPS Quaiser Khalid
- قیصر خالد
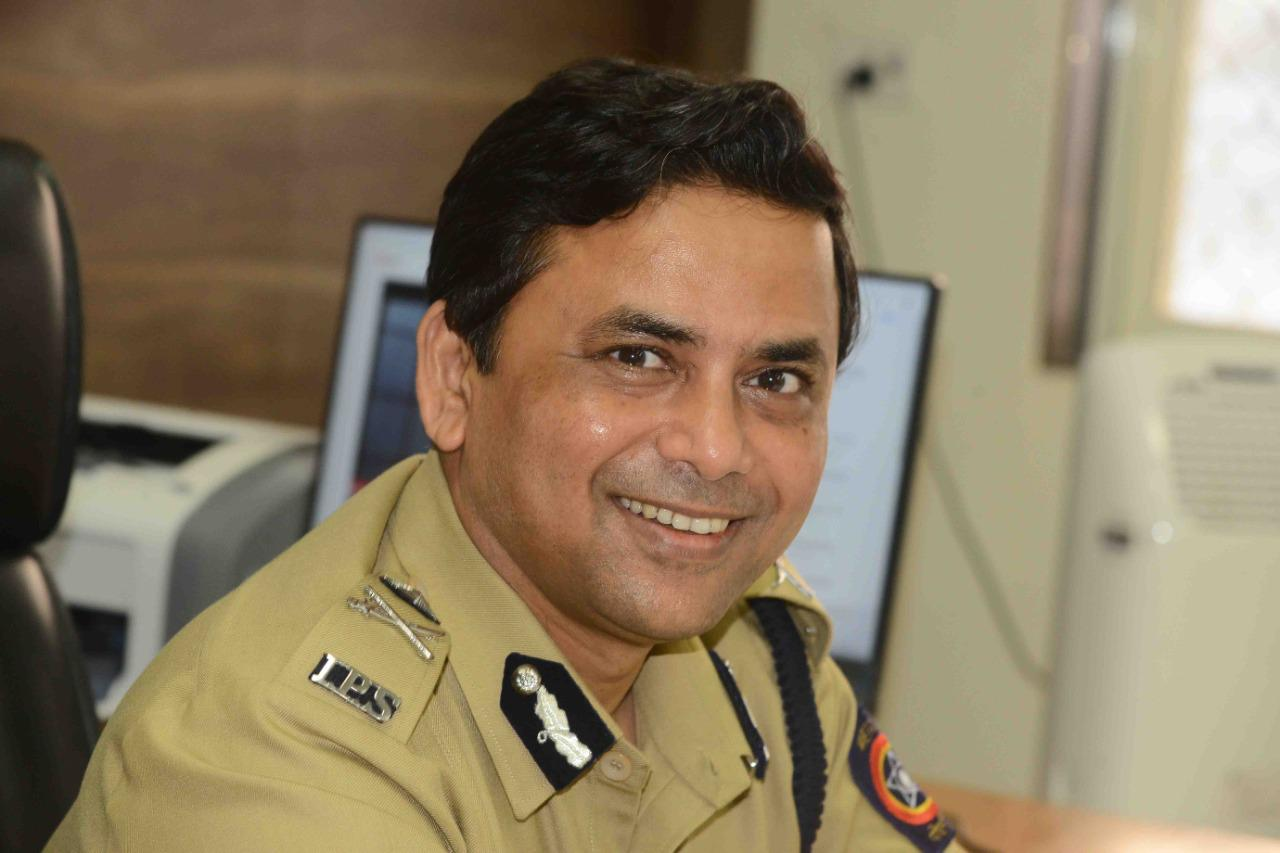
- Quaiser Khalid
- Born: 19 July 1971 (age 55); District Araria, Bihar, India
- Occupations: Indian Police Service, poet, teacher
- Organization: The Pasbaan-e-Adab (NGO)
- Notable work: Shaoor-e-Asr (2014); Dasht-e-Jaa.n (2016); Deewane-Shaad Azeemabadi (2004)
- Awards: Maharashtra State Urdu Sahitya Academy Award
- Website: www.quaiserkhalid.org

Quaiser Khalid (Hindi: क़ैसर खालीद; Urdu: قیصر خالد | born 19 July 1971) is an officer of the Indian Police Service (IPS), currently working as Inspector General of Police, Motor Transport, Maharashtra State, Pune.

Khalid is also a poet who writes in both Urdu and Hindi. He has written two anthologies of Urdu poetry, consisting of ghazals and nazms, and is the recipient of the Maharashtra State Urdu Sahitya Academy Award.

== Career ==
Khalid started his career as a trainee Assistant Superintendent of Police in Solapur rural police district of Maharashtra. He has served in Jalgaon, Gadchiroli, Sindhudurg, Wardha districts as Assistant/ Additional/ Superintendent of Police. He has also worked as Commanding Officer of State Reserve Police Force Group eleven Navi Mumbai and Group Four at Nagpur. He was instrumental in the creation of the India Reserve Battalion ( SRPF Group 15, Aurangabad). He has served as Deputy Commissioner of Police, Railways Central Zone, Deputy Commissioner of Police Port Zone, Additional Commissioner of police east region, Mumbai, Additional Commissioner of Police, Traffic, Mumbai, Additional Commissioner of Police Local Armed, Mumbai, officiating Managing Director, Maharashtra State Security Corporation and Inspector General of Police, Crime against weaker sections, women and children. He was serving as Commissioner of Police Railways Mumbai. The Maharashtra government suspended IPS officer Quaiser Khalid on June 26, 2024.

== Poetry ==
In 2005 Khalid edited and published the poetry collection of Urdu poet Syed Ali Mohammad Shaad Azimabadi. His first anthology, titled ‘Shawoore Asr’ (The consciousness of times) was published in 2014 and led to Khalid being awarded the Maharashtra state Urdu Sahitya Academy Award in 2015. This book was commented upon internationally

His second book Dashte Jaa'n (The Wilderness of Soul) was also published in 2014.

== Pasbaan-e-Adab ==
Quaiser Khalid is the founder-president of the non-profit and literary NGOs Pasbaan-e-adab, Mumbai and Jashn-e-Adab, New Delhi which organizes literary and cultural events in Indian languages especially Urdu Hindi and Marathi in various parts of the country. These organizations organized the following events:

- Anubhuti – The Hindi Literature Festival.
- Izhaar – The International Poetry Festival in Urdu.
- Kaavyanjali – The Marathi Poetry Festival
- Meeraas – The Heritage, An event of soulful Hindustani Poetry and Music
- Sahitya Utsav – The Festival of Indian Art and Literature and Culture in New Delhi and other North-Indian cities.

== Books ==
- Shaoor-e-Asr (2014)
- Dasht-e-Jaa.n (2016)
- Deewane-Shaad Azeemabadi (2004)(editor)

== Award ==
In recognition of her contributions to Urdu literature Quaiser Khalid has received awards including:

- 2015 - Maharashtra State Urdu Sahitya Academy Award

== Social initiatives ==
Khalid is working for improving the capability of students from under-privileged sections of the society. He is actively associated with anti-drug campaigns.

Quaiser Khalid, with his entire Mumbai Railway Police team, started an initiative 'Plasma Connect' to connect the Plasma Donors with the needy when Plasma Therapy was considered to help the patients.

During the COVID-19 pandemic, Quaiser Khalid in association with his NGO Pasbaan-e-adab started providing free oxygen cylinders, community fridges, food, and other variants of assistance to the needy when needed.
