= Pakistan Link =

Pakistani newspaper

- Type: Weekly newspaper
- Format: Broadsheet
- Publisher: PL Publications
- President: Arif Zaffar Mansuri
- Editor: Akhtar Mahmud Faruqui
- Language: English, Urdu
- Headquarters: Anaheim, California, United States
- Website: pakistanlink.org

Pakistan Link is a Pakistani weekly newspaper based in Anaheim, California, United States. The newspaper also has a version published in Urdu, called the Urdu Link. The newspaper Pakistan Link is distributed throughout the United States and is also sold through ethnic grocery stores in the US and Canada.

== News coverage of events in Pakistan ==
A prominent Pakistani politician Benazir Bhutto was assassinated on 27 December 2007 in Pakistan and this news was also covered by a California newspaper, Long Beach Press Telegram where its reporter interviewed many local people from among the 40,000 strong Pakistani American local community including a regular newspaper columnist from Pakistan Link newspaper, Nayyer Ali. Long Beach Press Telegram then used Nayyer Ali's quotes to write up their news article.

== Staff and columnists ==
- Arif Zaffar Mansuri – President and Managing Editor
- Akhtar Mahmud Faruqui – Editor
- Nayyer Ali – Columnist
- Dr. S. A. Hussain – Columnist
- Abdus Sattar Ghazali – Reporter at Large
- Dr. Ghulam M. Haniff – Columnist
- S. Arif Hussaini – Columnist
- Mowahid Shah – Columnist
- Dr. Mahjabeen Islam – Columnist
