= Tenali (disambiguation) =

Tenali is a city in Guntur district, Andhra Pradesh, India.

Tenali may also refer to:

== Places ==
- Tenali Municipality, municipality of the city
- Tenali revenue division, a revenue division in the Guntur district, Andhra Pradesh, India
- Tenali mandal, a mandal in Guntur district, Andhra Pradesh, India
- Tenali (Lok Sabha constituency), former Indian parliamentary constituency in Andhra Pradesh, India
- Tenali (Assembly constituency), Assembly constituency in Andhra Pradesh Legislative Assembly for Tenali city

== Others ==
- Tenali Ramakrishna, a Telugu poet and one of the eight poets at the court of Krishnadevaraya, the Vijayanagara emperor
  - Tenali Ramakrishna (film), a 1956 Indian Telugu-language film by B. S. Ranga
  - Tenali Raman (film), a 1956 Indian Tamil-language film by B. S. Ranga
  - Tenaliraman (film), a 2014 Indian Tamil-language film
  - Tenali Rama (TV series), a 2017 Indian TV series broadcast on Star Bharat
  - The Adventures of Tenali Raman, a 2003 Indian animated TV series on Cartoon Network
- Tenali Rama (film), a 2006 Indian film
- Tenali Ramakrishna BA. BL, a 2019 Indian film

== See also ==
- Tenaliraman (disambiguation)
- Thenali, a 2000 Tamil film
