= Tenaliraman =

Tenaliraman may refer to:

- Tenali Ramakrishna, a Telugu poet of the 16th-century
  - Tenali Ramakrishna (film), a 1956 Indian Telugu-language film by B. S. Ranga
  - Tenali Raman (film), a 1956 Indian Tamil-language film by B. S. Ranga
  - Tenaliraman (film), a 2014 Indian Tamil-language historical fiction political satire comedy film
  - Tenali Rama (TV series), a 2017 Indian TV series broadcast on Star Bharat
  - The Adventures of Tenali Raman, a 2003 Indian animated TV series on Cartoon Network
  - Tenali Rama (film), a 2006 Indian film
- Tenali Ramakrishna BA. BL, a 2019 Indian film

== See also ==
- Tenali (disambiguation)
