= 4th National Film Awards =

Indian ceremony celebrating cinema of 1956

- Awarded for: Best of Indian cinema in 1956
- Awarded by: Ministry of Information and Broadcasting
- Presented by: Rajendra Prasad (President of India)
- Presented on: 28 April 1957
- Site: Vigyan Bhavan, New Delhi
- Official website: dff.nic.in

Highlights
- Best Feature Film: Kabuliwala
- Most awards: • Kabuliwala • Tenali Ramakrishna (2)

The 4th National Film Awards, then known as State Awards for Films, presented by Ministry of Information and Broadcasting, India to felicitate the best of Indian Cinema released in the year 1956. Ceremony took place at Vigyan Bhavan, New Delhi on 28 April 1957 and awards were given by then President of India, Dr. Rajendra Prasad.

== Awards ==
Awards were divided into feature films and non-feature films.

President's gold medal for the All India Best Feature Film is now better known as National Film Award for Best Feature Film, whereas President's gold medal for the Best Documentary Film is analogous to today's National Film Award for Best Non-Feature Film. For children's films, Prime Minister's gold medal is now given as National Film Award for Best Children's Film. At the regional level, President's silver medal for Best Feature Film is now given as National Film Award for Best Feature Film in a particular language. Certificate of Merit in all the categories is discontinued over the years.

=== Feature films ===
Feature films were awarded at All India as well as regional level. For the 4th National Film Awards, in this category, Kabuliwala, a Bengali film, along with a Telugu film, Tenali Ramakrishna won the maximum number of awards (two), with former also winning the President's gold medal for the All India Best Feature Film. Following were the awards given:

==== All India Award ====
For 4th National Film Awards, none of the films were awarded from Children's films category as no film was found to be suitable. Only Certificate of Merit for Children's films was given. Following were the awards given in each category:

Award	Film	Language	Awardee(s)	
Award	Film	Language	Producer	Director
President's gold medal for the All India Best Feature Film	Kabuliwala	Bengali	Charuchitra	Tapan Sinha
All India Certificate of Merit	Bandhan	Hindi	Sircar Productions	Hem Chunder
All India Certificate of Merit	Tenali Ramakrishna	Telugu	Vikram Productions	B. S. Ranga
All India Certificate of Merit for Best Children's Film	Jaldeep	Bengali	Children's Film Society	Kidar Sharma

==== Regional Award ====
The awards were given to the best films made in the regional languages of India. For 4th National Film Awards, President's silver medal for Best Feature Film was not given in Hindi, Kannada and Tamil language; instead Certificate of Merit was awarded in each particular language, whereas no award was given for Assamese, Malayalam and Marathi language films.

Award	Film	Awardee(s)	
Award	Film	Producer	Director
Feature Films in Bengali
President's silver medal for Best Feature Film in Bengali	Kabuliwala	Charuchitra	Tapan Sinha
Certificate of Merit	Mahakavi Girishchandra	Emkeji Productions	Madhu Bose
Certificate of Merit	Ek Din Ratre	R. K. Films	Sombhu Mitra
Certificate of Merit	Ek Din Ratre	R. K. Films	Amit Maitra
Feature Films in Hindi
Certificate of Merit	Basant Bahar	Shri Vishwa Bharati Films	R. Chandra
Feature Films in Kannada
Certificate of Merit	Bhakta Vijaya	Jagannath Productions	A. K. Pattabhi
Feature Films in Tamil
Certificate of Merit	Kula Dheivam	S. K. Pictures	Krishnan–Panju
Feature Films in Telugu
President's silver medal for Best Feature Film in Telugu	Tenali Ramakrishna	Vikram Productions	B. S. Ranga
Certificate of Merit	Edi Nijam	Pratibha Productions	S. Balachander

=== Non-Feature films ===
Non-feature film awards were given for the documentaries made in the country. Following were the awards given:

==== Documentaries ====
Award	Film	Language	Awardee(s)	
Award	Film	Language	Producer	Director
President's gold medal for the Best Documentary Film	Gotama The Buddha	English	Bimal Roy Productions (for Films Division)	Rajbans Khanna
Certificate of Merit	Khajuraho	English	Films Division	M. Wadhwani
Certificate of Merit	A Village In Travancore	English	Art Films of Asia Private Ltd. (for Burmah-Shell)	Fali Billimoria

=== Awards not given ===
Following were the awards not given as no film was found to be suitable for the award:

- Prime Minister's gold medal for the Best Children's Film
- President's silver medal for Best Feature Film in Assamese
- President's silver medal for Best Feature Film in Hindi
- President's silver medal for Best Feature Film in Kannada
- President's silver medal for Best Feature Film in Malayalam
- President's silver medal for Best Feature Film in Marathi
- President's silver medal for Best Feature Film in Tamil
