= Nimtita Zamindar Bari =

Zamindari palace of Nimtita

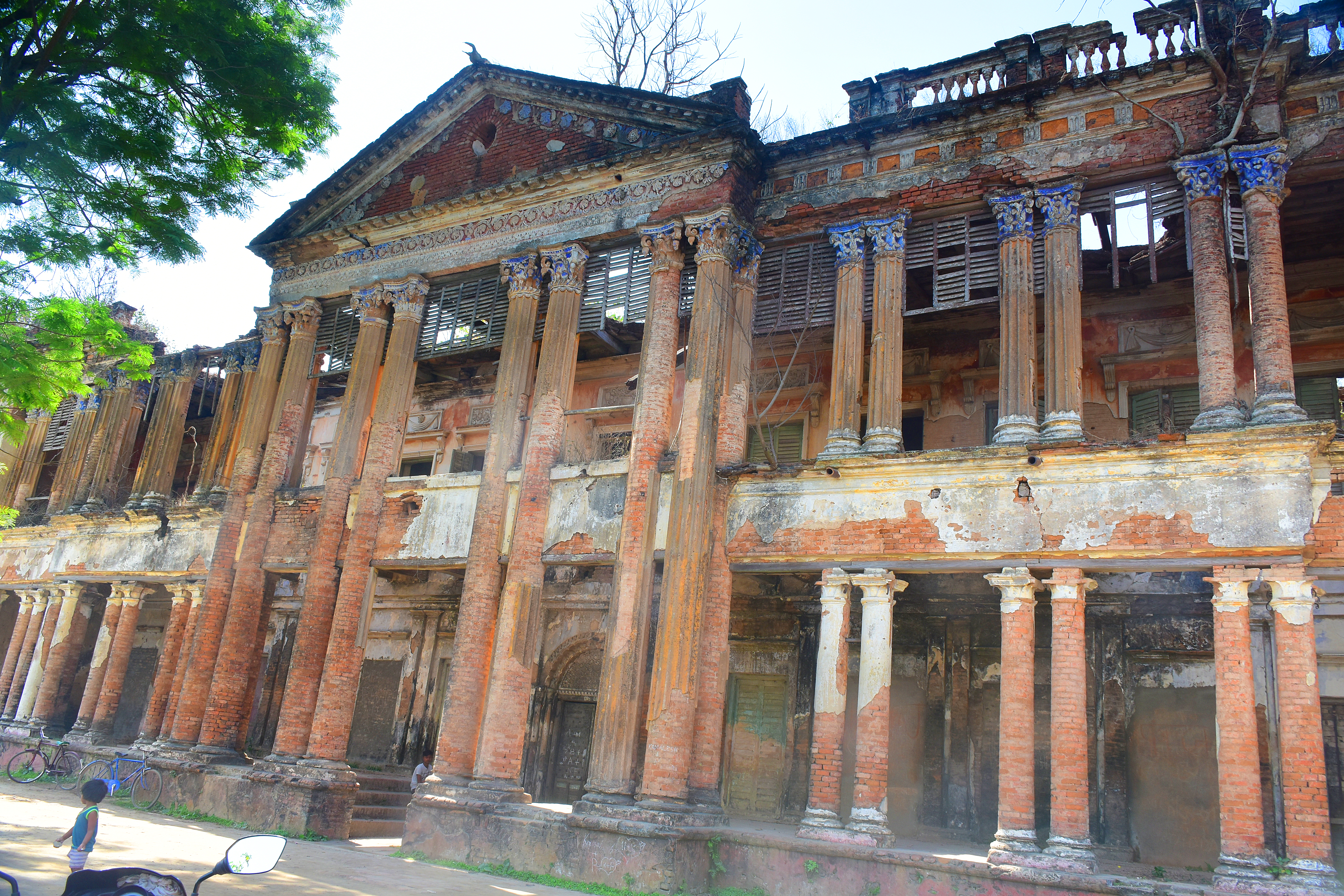
- Nimitita Zamindar Bari: Ruined front facade
- Country: India
- Founder: Babu Goursundar Choudhury and Babu Dwarakanath Choudhury

Nimtita zamindar Bari, often called Nimtita Rajbari, is an erstwhile zamindari palace which used to be the official residence of the zamindar family of Nimtita in British India. The Nimtita village of Murshidabad district houses this palace which is situated on the bank of Ganges.

== History ==
In the years between 1866 and 1867, two cousins, Goursundar Choudhury and Dwarakanath Choudhury, acquired substantial land holdings to form the Nimtita Estate. Besides, Zamindar Mahendra Narayan Roy of this family which patronized noted painter Kshitindranath Mazumdar for joining Government College of Art and Craft (then Government Art School) in Calcutta. Also this family founded the Nimtita G.D. Institution (a Higher Secondary school) in Nimtita in 1913.

== In culture and social life of Nimtita ==
Every year, the family put on a proscenium stage show called Jatra-pala for two weeks during Holi. Talk of the community and even as far as Murshidabad would revolve around the magnificence and wealth portrayed during the yearly Durga Puja celebration. The brothers were fond of theatre. The whole cast of Star Theatre in Calcutta was invited to perform at the wedding of Gnyanendranath, son of Dwarakanath.

== Current condition ==
Although the Rajbari continued to exist, the Zamindari system was abolished in 1955. After the estate failed, things began to deteriorate. Situated on a landmass of almost 200 kathas (14 acres), the palace has suffered the loss of its theatre, as well as a significant portion of its courtyard, gardens, and the guest homes that surrounded it, housing the zamindar's guests. The Durga puja of this family still gets celebrated without the trace of opulence. The Nimtita zamindar bari was designated as a heritage site by the West Bengal Heritage Commission in June 2022.

== In popular culture and literature ==
The 1958 film Jalshaghar starring Chhabi Biswas, one of the greatest works of Satyajit Ray was shot in this palace in 1957. The script was based on a short story by Tarashankar Bandopadhyay who was inspired to write the short story about a man who defied social change. Even though he watched the vast river devour his holdings, he persisted.

Ray had also selected the Nimtita zamindari palace as his shooting spot for his 1960 film Devi and 1961 film Samapti.

Nalinikanta Sarkar has mentioned about the Choudhuries of Nimtita in his book 'Aasaa-Jaoyar Majhkhane'. The Choudhuries of Nimtita were close allies of the Choudhuries of Jagtai.

== In political campaign ==
The palace became Renuka Ray's headquarters for her election campaign.

== Gallery ==
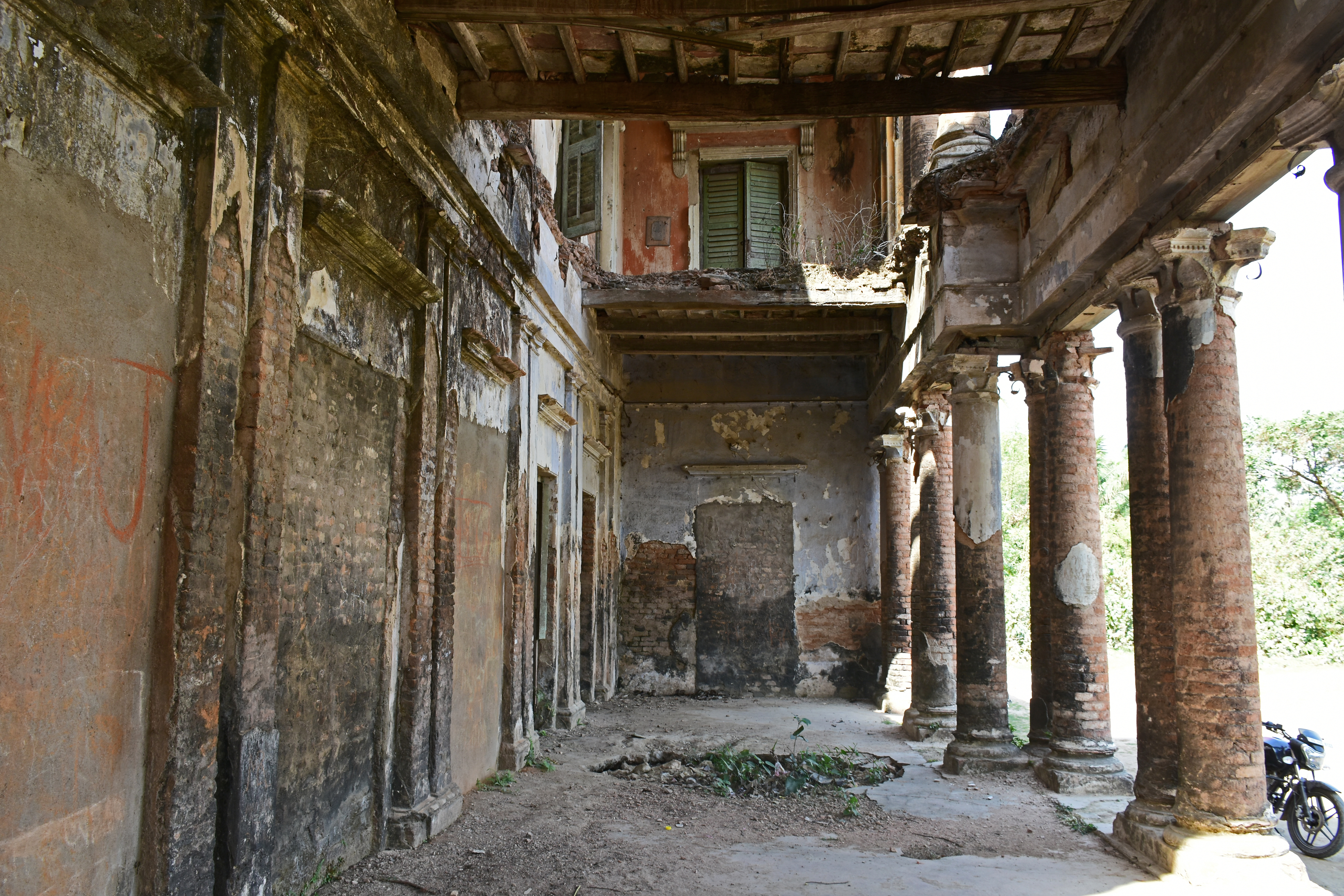

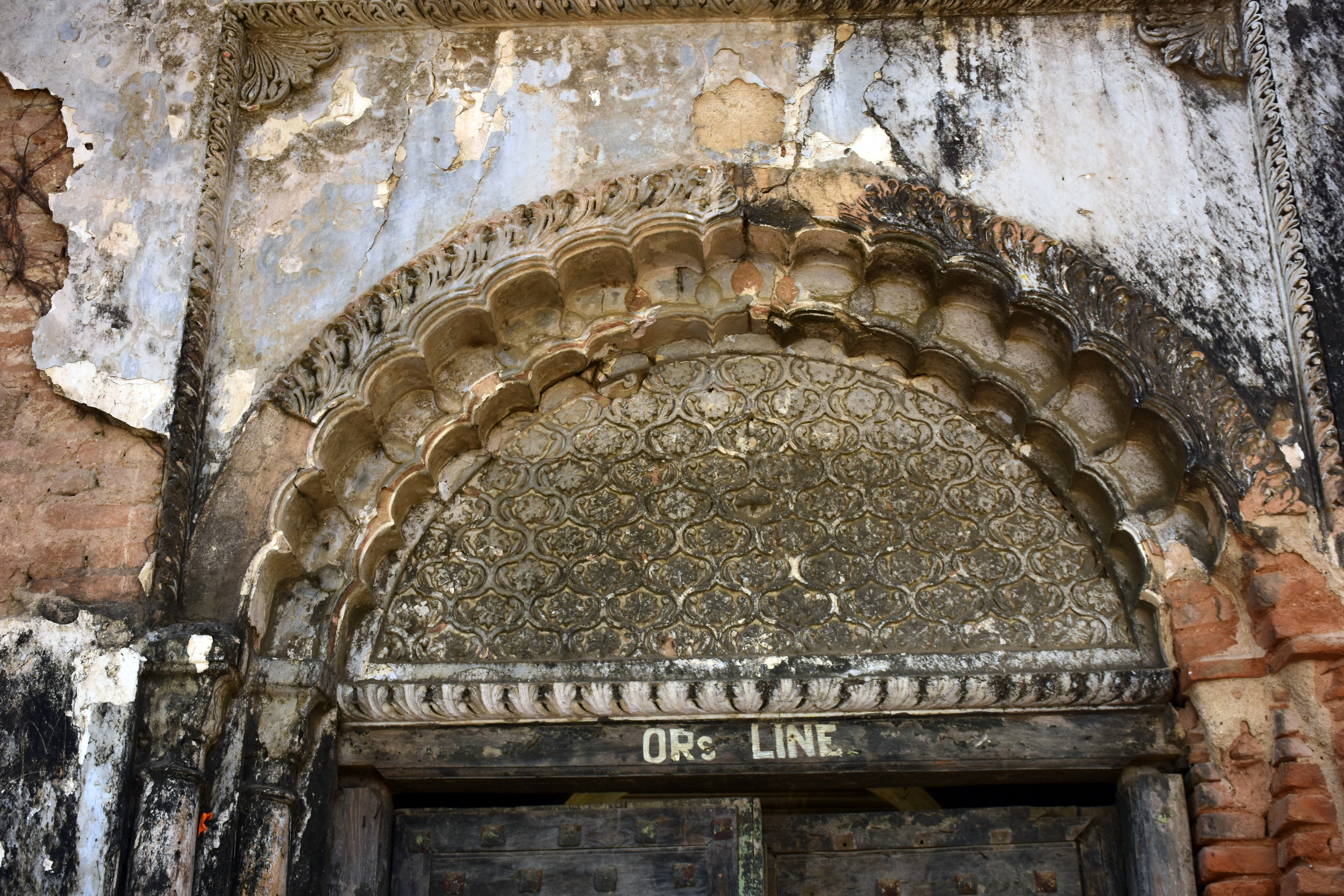

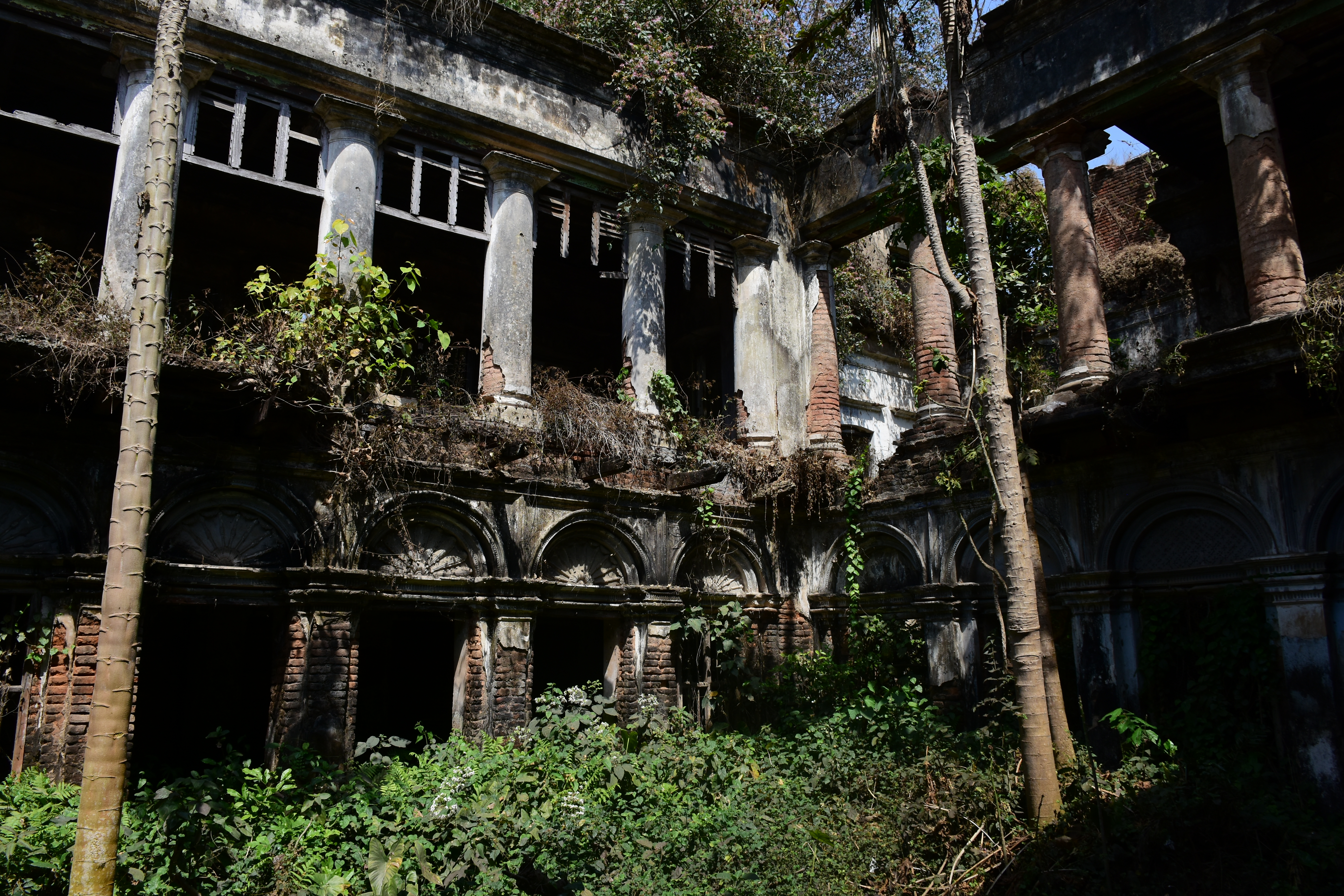
