= Jagtai Choudhury Bari =

Choudhury Zamindars of Jagtai

Jagtai Choudhury Bari জগতাই চৌধুরী বাড়ি
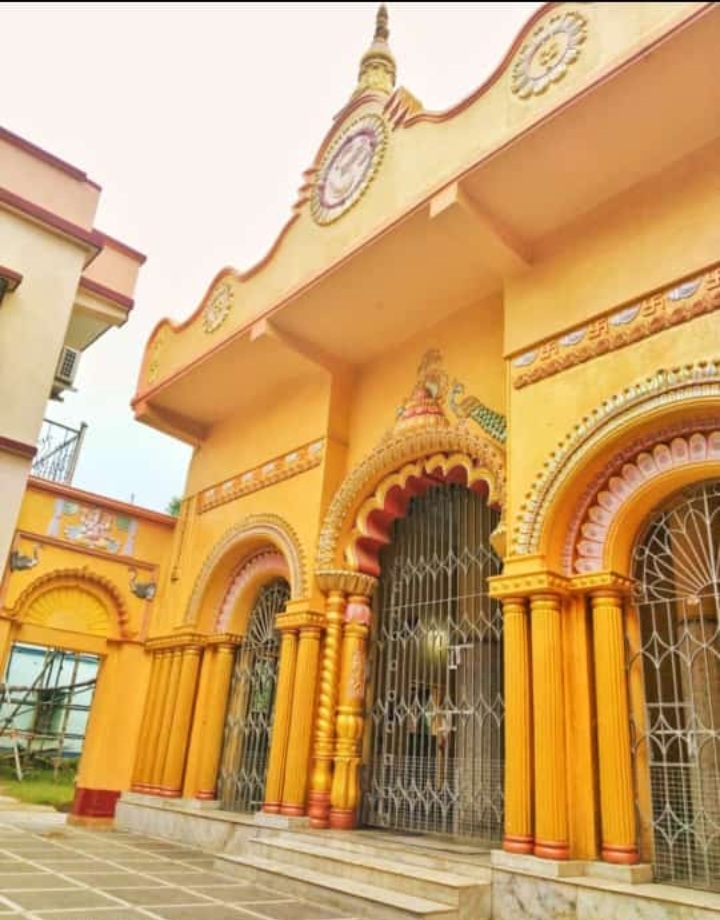
- Durga Dalan of Jagtai Choudhury Bari
- Country: India
- Founder: Rani Gaurangini Devi

Jagtai Choudhury Bari (Bengali: জগতাই চৌধুরী বাড়ি) is the residential house of the erstwhile zamindar family based in Jagtai of Murshidabad district in West Bengal, India. The Choudhury estate was established by Rani Gaurangini Devi in the 18th century in British-occupied India. The first zamindar of this family was Babu Keshto Mohun Choudhury. The last zamindar of Jagtai was Shri Sailendranath Choudhury until the effective abolition of the zamindari in 1955 under the West Bengal Estates Acquisition Act of 1953.

== History ==
Jagtai Choudhury family originated from a Pabna-based landed aristocratic family to which Rani Gaurangini Devi, the wife of Babu Saheblal Choudhury, belonged. After the death of Saheblal Choudhury, Gaurangini Devi moved from Pabna to Sherpur of Nimtita of erstwhile Murshidabad. Previously, every year during monsoon, Sherpur and surrounding area used to be flooded due to overflow of river Ganga. To get rid of such disasters, Gaurangini Devi built the grand Choudhury villa at Jagtai wiping out the jungles of straw. Reportedly, she handed over the zamindari to her son Babu Keshto Mohun Choudhury. According to some reports, he was the one who started the Durga Puja of Choudhury family in 18th century.

Jagtai Zamindari জগতাই জমিদারি
- Zamindari Estate
- Number of villages: 7-8 villages (Jagtai as headquarters)
- Possession: 18th century
- Accession: 1955

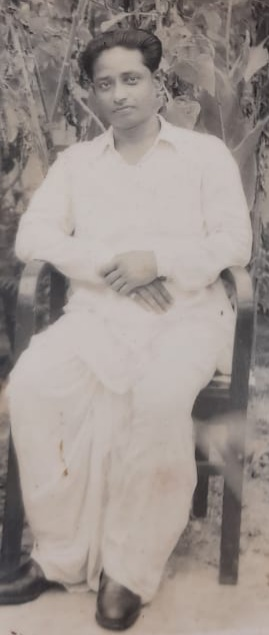
Babu Sailendranath Choudhury, the last zamindar of Jagtai

== Legend ==
Once Gaurangini Devi was heading towards Ganga in a palanquin for a bathe. But, to her surprise, she noticed some British men taking bathe in the bathing ghat allotted for only women. She raised her voice against the British men's unacceptable and unlawful behaviour. Her voice of protest reached to the then Borolat who became impressed with Rani Gaurangini's bold action and offered her the zamindari of Jagtai along with other 7 to 8 villages. It is said that she handed over the zamindari to her son Keshto Mohun Choudhury. Some reports claim that he was the one who initiated the Choudhury family's Durga Puja in the 18th century.

== In culture and social life of Jagtai ==
=== Woman empowerment ===
Gaurangini Devi founded the Jagtai Choudhury Estate as a result of her protest against the unlawful presence of Bojra of British officials in the bathing ghat of Ganga allotted for women only. This act is regarded as an early example of a woman's resistance in Jagtai during the 18th century, symbolizing a form of empowerment against the British Raj.

=== Durga Puja ===
The Jagtai Choudhury Bari is one of the central attractions in Suti for its 240 years' (according to some other reports 300 years) old Durga Puja. The first zamindar from this family was Babu Keshto Mohun Choudhury who first started the Durga Puja of this family. (Note: The year of inception of Durga Puja of Jagtai Choudhury family is not out of dispute. According to a news covered by Sangbad Pratidin in 2020, the Durga Puja was first celebrated by Choudhury family around 296 years ago, thereby indicating the time period from 1720 to 1725. But, on the other hand, it is also estimated that the puja was first celebrated in Sherpur of Nimtita in around 1784 AD, before the family's permanent shifting to the Jagtai zamindari palace.) The Durga Puja of this family is the oldest within this area. The main attraction of the Choudhury family Durga Puja is the Kumari Puja on the maha navami tithi where the Devi is worshipped in the form of 'Kumari'. Another major event of the puja is Balak Bhojan in which all the infants and teenagers are offered Prasada in the premises of Choudhury bari on Durga Ashtami tithi. During initial days, 108 dhaks used to be played by 108 dhakis during the puja, in the Nat Mandir. But, now 2 dhaks are played as part of this major festival.

=== In literature ===
Nalinikanta Sarkar, in his book 'Aasaa-Jaoyar Majhkhane' has mentioned multiple times, about the Choudhuries of Jagtai. The Choudhuries of Jagtai were close allies of the Choudhuries of Nimtita. The Jagtai Choudhury family is featured in Kalyan Das’s book মুর্শিদাবাদের বনেদি বাড়ি (in English: Aristocratic Families of Murshidabad), which documents the histories of several prominent aristocratic families of colonial Murshidabad.
