= Purnendu Mukherjee =

Indian film actor

- Born: Purnendu Shekhar Mukherjee
- Occupation: Actor
- Notable work: Anjangarh (1948); Pratibad (1948); Datta (1951); Devi (1960)

Purnendu Mukherjee a.k.a Purnendu Mukhopadhyay was an Indian actor who is known for his work in Bengali cinema and theatre. He portrayed Ranjan in Hemchander Chunder's Pratibad, Naren in Soumyen Mukherjee's Datta (1951) and Taraprasad in Satyajit Ray's Devi (1960).

== Career ==
Purnendu Mukherjee achieved his fame as a thespian actor in the early 1940s. Pratima (1946) directed by Khagen Ray was his first film assignment. He portrayed Naren in Soumyen Mukherjee's Datta (1951) based on Sarat Chandra Chattopadhyay's eponymous novel of the same name. He played Govindalal in Khagen Ray's Krishnakanter Will (1952) which is based on Bankim Chandra Chatterjee's novel of the same name.

== Filmography ==
Year	Films	Role	Director	Ref.
1946	Pratima		Khagen Ray	
1948	Anjangarh		Bimal Ray	
1948	Pratibad	Ranjan	Hemchander Chunder	
1948	Samapika			
1949	Ananya			
1951	Datta	Naren	Soumyen Mukherjee	
1952	Krishnakanter Will	Govindalal	Khagen Ray	
1960	Devi	Taraprasad	Satyajit Ray	
1961	Rabindranath Tagore		Satyajit Ray	
1964	Bireswar Vivekananda	Maharshi		
1990	Ganashatru		Satyajit Ray	
1990	Ek Doctor Ki Maut		Tapan Sinha	
