= Madh Bhare Nain =

- Directed by: Hemchander Chunder
- Starring: Kishore Kumar; Bina Rai
- Release date: 1955
- Country: India
- Language: Hindi

Madh Bhare Nain is a 1943 Bollywood drama film, directed by Hemchander Chunder . It stars Kishore Kumar, Bina Rai and more.

== Cast ==
- Kishore Kumar,
- Bina Rai
- David Abraham
- Achala sachdev
- Yasodhara Katsu
