= Prabhat Kumar Mukhopadhyay =

Indian writer (1873–1932)

- Born: Prabhat Kumar Mukhopadhyay; 3 February 1873; Dhatrigram, Burdwan, Bengal Presidency, British India (now in Purba Bardhaman district, India)
- Died: 5 April 1932 (aged 59); Calcutta, Bengal Presidency, British India

Prabhat Kumar Mukhopadhyay (3 February 1873–5 April 1932) was a Bengali writer. He was born at Dhatrigram in present-day Purba Bardhaman district, West Bengal at his maternal uncle's house. His native place was Gurap in Hooghly district, West Bengal.

== Personal life ==
In 1888, he passed the entrance exam at the Jamalpur High School. In 1891, he received a Fine Arts degree from Patna College. In 1895, he received his bachelor's degree and he then went to study abroad in London. From 1901 to 1903, he studied law in London.

In 1903, after becoming a barrister, he returned to Bengal to practice law in Darjeeling, Rangpur, and Gaya. He practiced law in these regions until 1916 when he became a professor at the University of Calcutta. He was a professor here until his death in 1932.

== Works ==
Prabhat Kumar Mukhopadhyay is known to be a very famous and proficient writer in Bengali Literature. After Rabindranath Tagore, he is the best known short story writer. He wrote novels, short stories, and poems. His poems were published in the Bharati, a Bengali periodical, while he was still in school. He gained fame writing short stories, which are based on looking at life in a light-hearted, simple, way. During his career, he wrote over one hundred stories and fourteen novels.

At times he wrote under two pseudonyms, Sri Janoarchandra Sharma and Srimati Radhamoni.

He received the Kuntalin Prize to acknowledge his writings.

=== Novels ===
- Ramasundari (1908)
- Nabin Sannyasi (1912)
- Ratnadeep (1915)
  - This novel was considered to be his greatest; it was made into a movie.
- Jibaner Mulya (1917)
- Sindur Kauta (1919)
- Maner Manus (1922)
- Arati (1927)
- Devi (1960 film)Devi (1960 film)#'
  - In 1960 Satyajit Roy, has created a Devi (1960 film)Devi (1960 film)#|movie]] around this novel.
- Pratima (1928)
- Garib Svami (1930)

=== Short story collections ===
- Nabakatha (1899)
- Sodashi (1906)
- Galpavjali (1913)
- Galpabithi (1916)
- Patrapuspa (1917)
- Nutan Bau (1929)
- Gohonar Baksho
- Hotash Premik
- Bilashini
- Juboker Prem
- Jamata Babajee
- The Price Of Flowers
- The Muscular Son-in-law

=== Other works ===
- A satire named Abhishap (1900)
- A play, Suksmalom Parinay, which was published under one of his pseudonyms.
