= Nimtita =

- Village
- Location in West Bengal, India Nimtita (India)
- Coordinates: 24.6505°N 87.9701°E
- Country: India
- State: West Bengal
- District: Murshidabad

Population (2011)
  - Total: 2,068

Languages
  - Official: Bengali, English
- Time zone: UTC+5:30 (IST)
- PIN: 742224
- Telephone/STD code: 03485
- Vehicle registration: WB
- Lok Sabha constituency: Maldaha Dakshin
- Vidhan Sabha constituency: Samserganj
- Website: murshidbad.nic.in

Nimtita is a village and gram panchayat in the Samserganj CD block in the Jangipur subdivision of Murshidabad district in the state of West Bengal, India.

== History ==
Two cousins, Gour Sundar and Dwarikanath Choudhury purchased large tracts of land and established the Nimtita Estate around 1866–67. In June 2022, the Nimtita Rajbari was declared as a heritage under the West Bengal Heritage Commission. The house itself was miraculously spared." The Rajbari survived but 1955 saw the abolition of the zamindari system. The estate collapsed and things started decaying. There were pleasant breaks – Satyajit Ray came to shoot films here (see below for more details) and Renuka Ray made the Rajbari her election campaign headquarters – but for all practical purposes, it had reached the end of its glorious chapter.

Note:Nimtita Rajbari is located on the banks of the Ganges, near Jagtai.

== Geography ==
Cities, towns and locations in the northern portion of Jangipur subdivision, Murshidabad district (including Farakka, Samserganj, Suti II CD blocks)
M: municipal town, CT: census town, R: rural/ urban centre, F: Facility
Abbreviation- TPS: Thermal Power Station
Owing to space constraints in the small map, the actual locations in a larger map may vary slightly

=== Location ===
Nimtita is located at 24.6505°N 87.9701°E.

=== Area overview ===
Jangipur subdivision is crowded with 52 census towns and as such it had to be presented in two location maps. One of the maps can be seen alongside. The subdivision is located in the Rarh region that is spread over from adjoining Santhal Pargana division of Jharkhand. The land is slightly higher in altitude than the surrounding plains and is gently undulating. The river Ganges, along with its distributaries, is prominent in both the maps. At the head of the subdivision is the 2,245 m long Farakka Barrage, one of the largest projects of its kind in the country. Murshidabad district shares with Bangladesh a porous international border which is notoriously crime prone (partly shown in this map). The subdivision has two large power plants - the 2,100 MW Farakka Super Thermal Power Station and the 1,600 MW Sagardighi Thermal Power Station. According to a 2016 report, there are around 1,000,000 (1 million/ ten lakh) workers engaged in the beedi industry in Jangipur subdivision. 90% are home-based and 70% of the home-based workers are women. As of 2013, an estimated 2.4 million people reside along the banks of the Ganges alone in Murshidabad district. Severe erosion occurs along the banks.

Note: The two maps present some of the notable locations in the subdivision. All places marked in the maps are linked in the larger full screen maps.

== Demographics ==
According to the 2011 Census of India, Nimtita had a total population of 2,068, of which 1,011 (49%) were males and 1,057 (50%) were females. Population in the age range 0–6 years was 262. The total number of literate persons in Nimtita was 1,031 (57.09% of the population over 6 years).

== Transport ==
Nimtita railway station has the station code NILE. In normal times many trains stopped at this station.

== Education ==
Nimtita G.D. Institution is a Bengali-medium coeducational institution established in 1913. It has facilities for teaching from class V to class XII. The school has a playground and a library with 1,500 books.

== Culture ==
Nimtita Rajbari, on the bank of the Ganges, is now a dilapidated structure, a testimony of a glorious past. It had inspired Tarashankar Bandopadhyay to write a short-story about a man who refused to change with the times. He saw the mighty river gobble up his estates, but would not give up. Satyajit Ray made one of his great films based on that story – Jalsaghar, with the legendary Chhabi Biswas in the lead role. It was shot at Nimtita Rajbari in 1957, and then the maestro followed it up with the shooting of Devi in 1960 and Samapti in 1961. The Rajbari was obviously in a great shape in those days. The ruins are now in danger of being devoured by the river.

== Nimtita Rajbari picture gallery ==
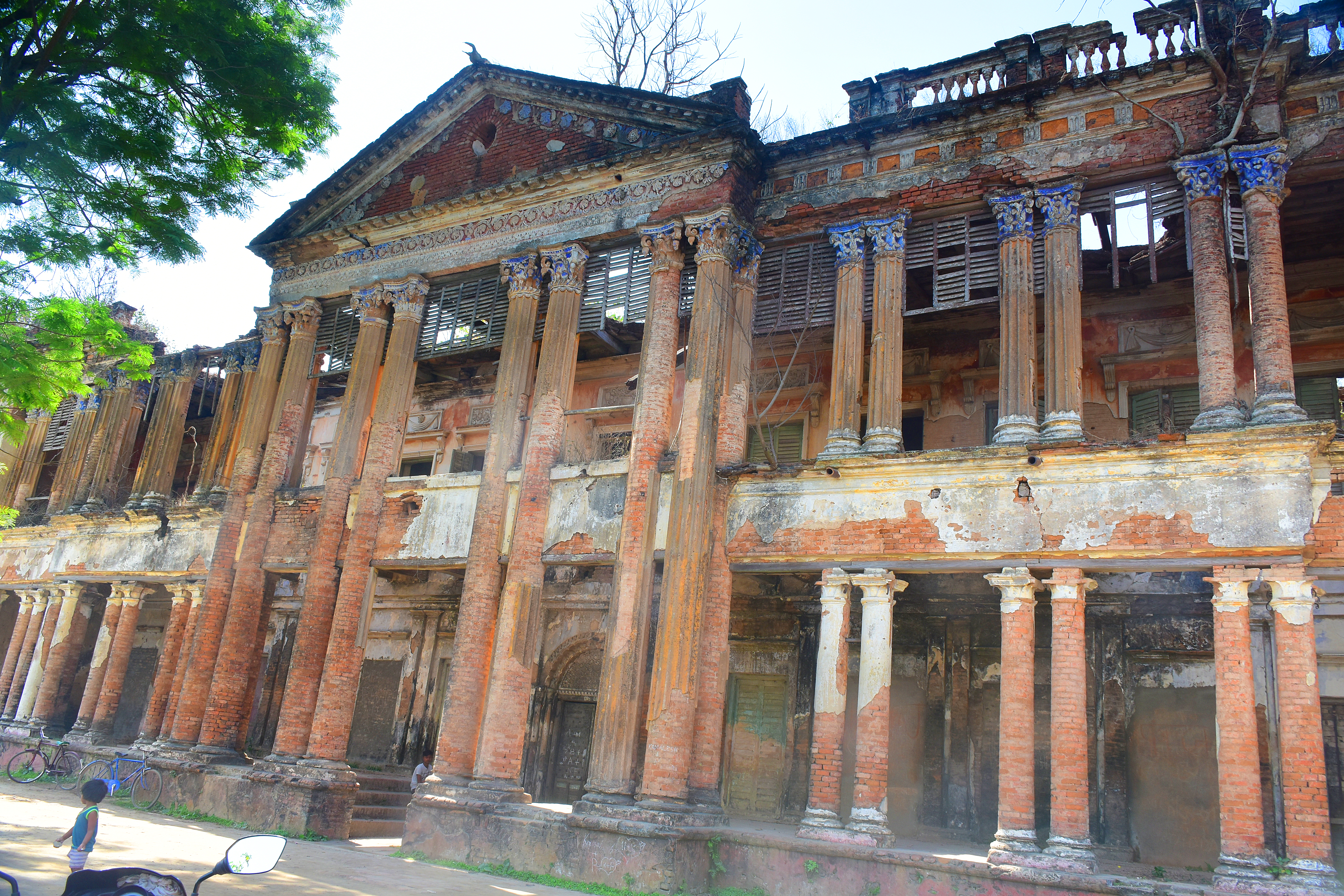

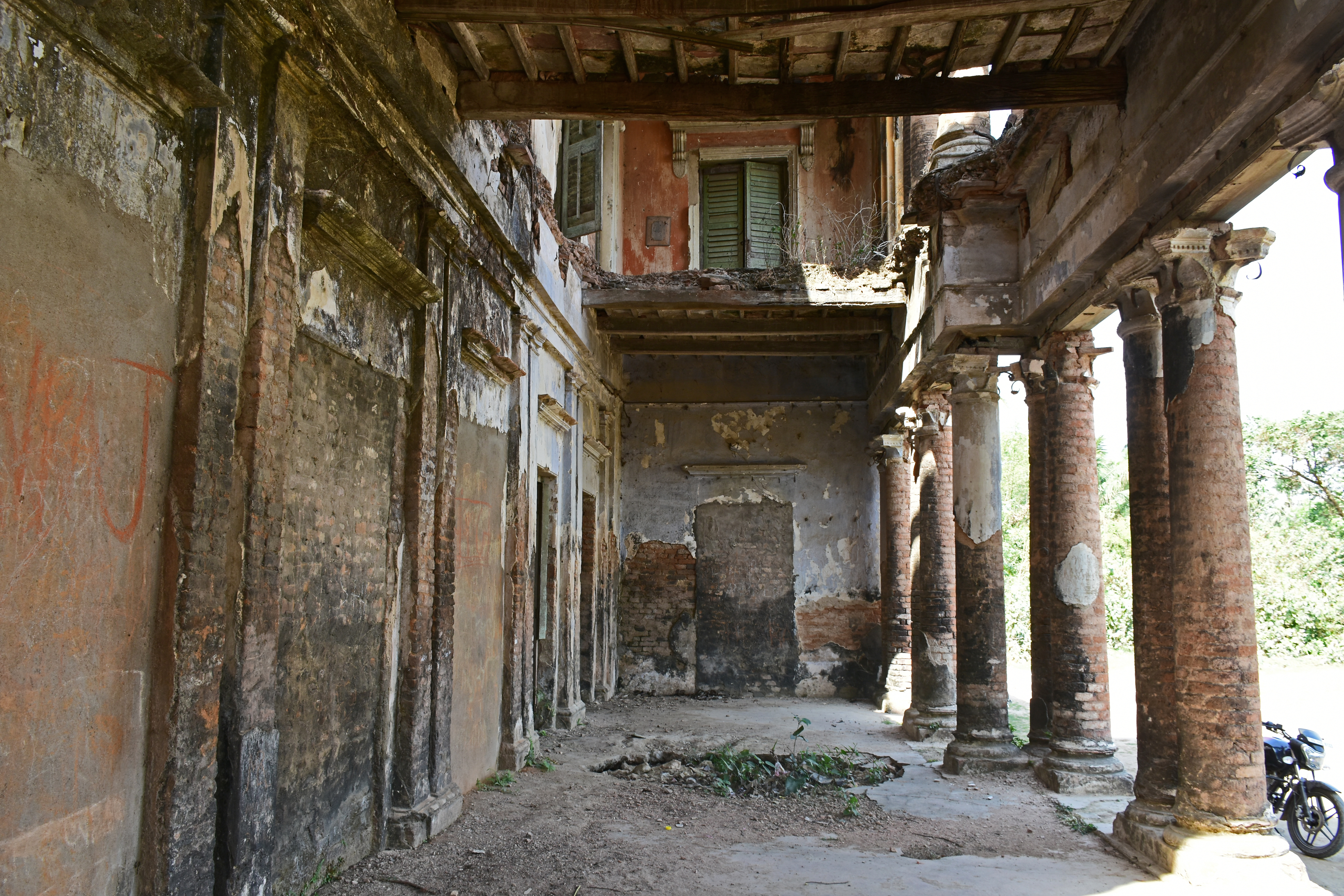

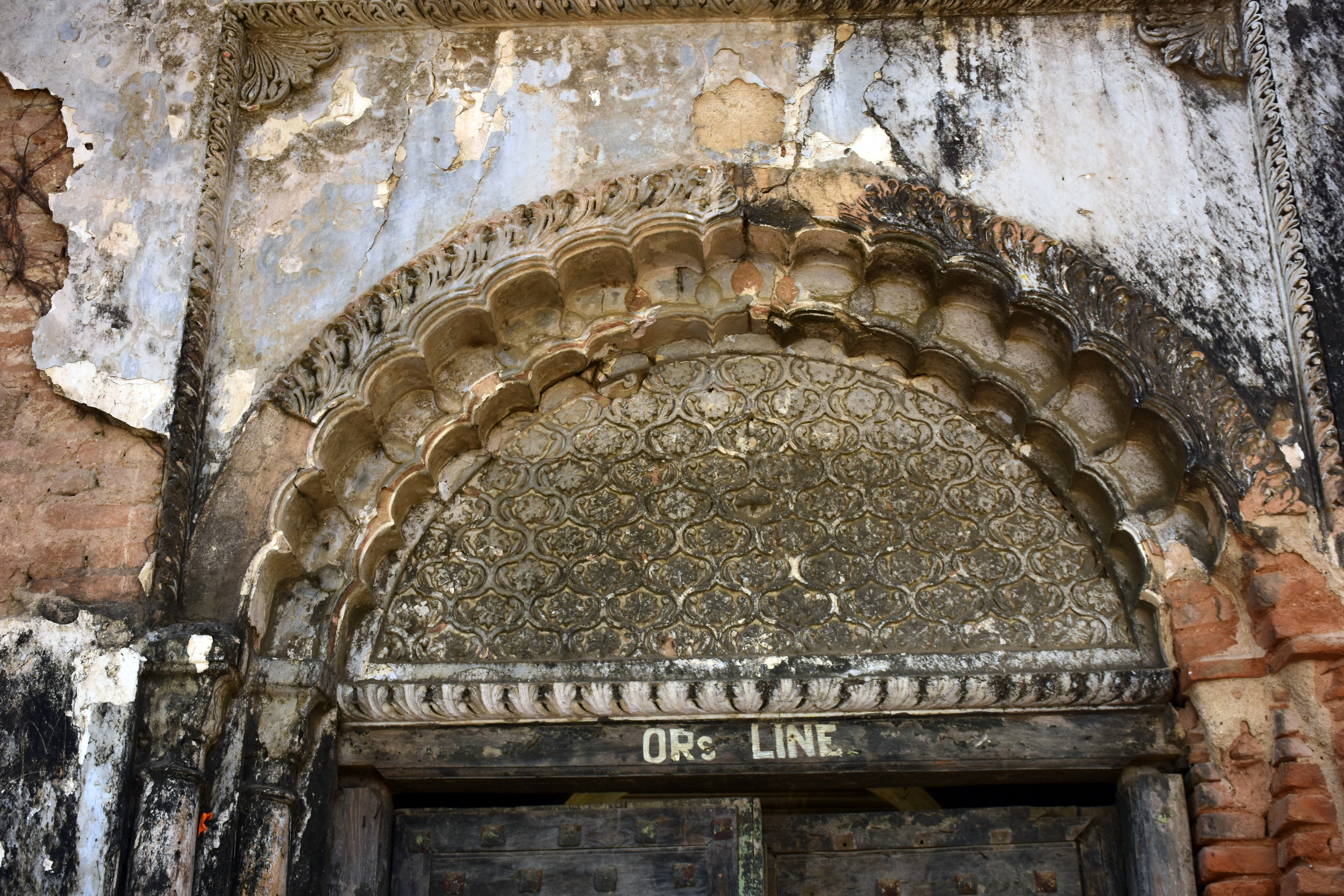

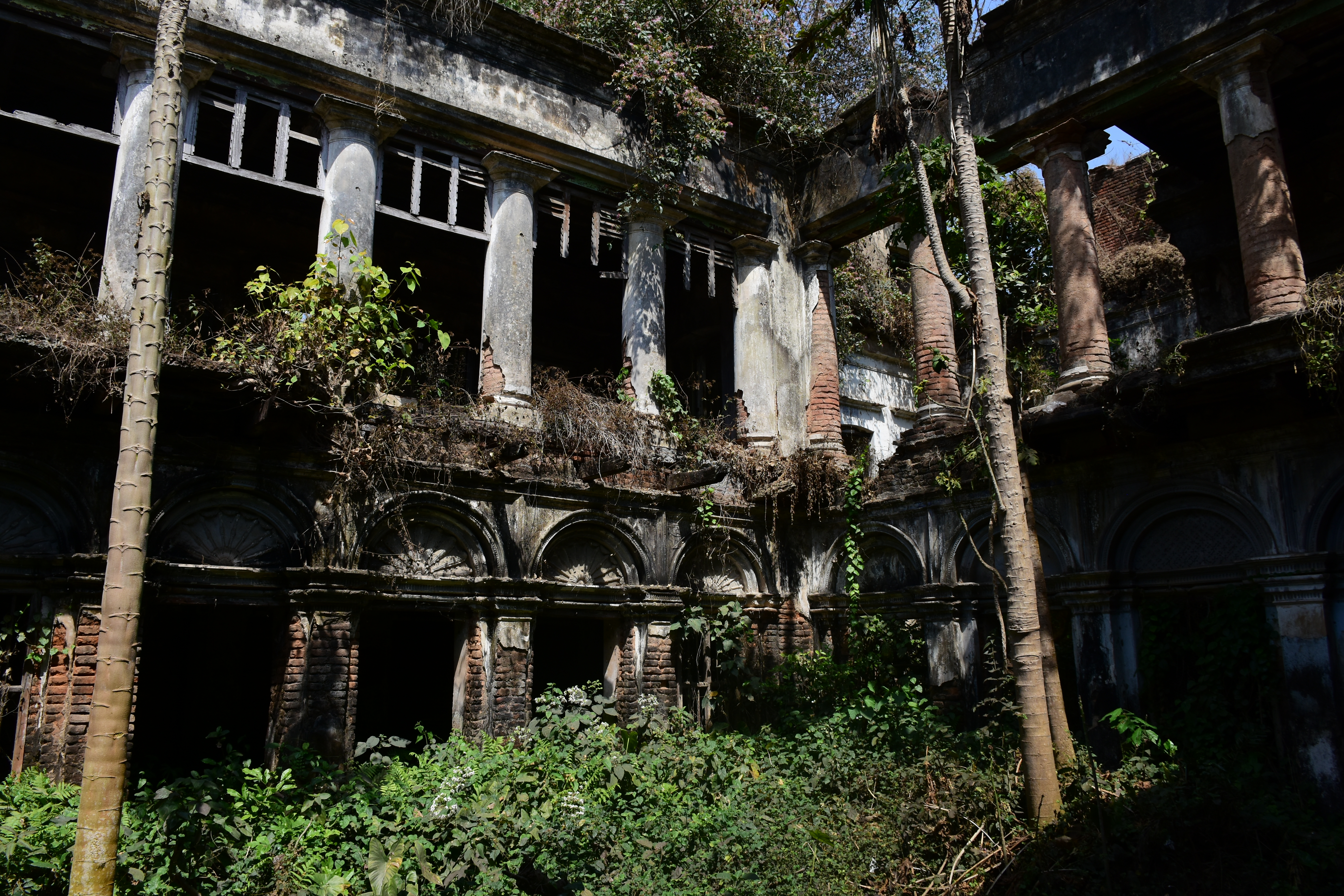

== Healthcare ==
Samserganj CD block is one of the areas of Murshidabad district where ground water is affected by a high level of arsenic contamination. The WHO guideline for arsenic in drinking water is 10 mg/ litre, and the Indian Standard value is 50 mg/ litre. The maximum concentration in Samserganj CD block is 287 mg/litre.

== See also ==
- River bank erosion along the Ganges in Malda and Murshidabad districts
