= Pratibad (1948 film) =

1948 Indian film

- Poster of the film
- Directed by: Hemchander Chunder
- Written by: Binoy Chatterjee
- Produced by: New Theatres
- Starring: Bharati Devi; Sumitra Devi; Purnendu Mukherjee; Devi Mukherjee; Chandrabati Devi; Dhiraj Bhattacharya; Manoranjan Bhattacharya
- Music by: Pankaj Mullick
- Distributed by: Aurora Films
- Release date: 19 June 1948
- Country: India
- Language: Bengali

Pratibad (transl. Protest), also known as Oonch Neech (transl. High and low) is a 1948 Bengali film directed by Hemchander Chunder and produced by New Theatres. The film was dubbed in Hindi under the title Oonch Neech. The cinematic production presents a repudiation of discriminatory practices predicated upon caste-based affiliations. The narrative follows Malati, an inherent of untouchability, who opposes her sister Madhabi who aspires to terminate caste discrimination. Malati refuses Narendra's proposal as she is in love with Ranjan. However, her emotional equilibrium is disrupted when Ranjan confesses to her that he is actually in love with her sister Madhabi. Further revelation of her adoption by Beniprasad, after the death of her biological father Hari, a Chandala exacerbates her mental distress. The narrative then follows her catharsis. The film stars Bharati Devi, Sumitra Devi, Purnendu Mukherjee, Devi Mukherjee, Chandrabati Devi, Dhiraj Bhattacharya and Manoranjan Bhattacharya.

== Plot ==
Malati, the daughter of the late Beniprasad, is inherently prejudiced against individuals from lower castes, and this stance is starkly contrasted by her sister Madhabi's aspirations to eradicate caste-based discrimination. Malati rejects Narendra's proposal, as she is in love with Ranjan. However, her emotional equilibrium is disrupted when Ranjan confesses his love for her sister Madhabi, leaving Malati to grapple with a profound psychological turmoil.

The revelation of her adoption by Beniprasad, coupled with the discovery that her biological father, Hari, was a Chandala, further compounds her mental distress. The narrative subsequently unfolds her journey towards catharsis, tracing the trajectory of her emotional transformation and introspection.

== Cast ==
- Bharati Devi as Malati
- Sumitra Devi as Madhabi
- Purnendu Mukherjee as Narendra
- Devi Mukherjee as Ranjan
- Chandrabati Devi
- Dhiraj Bhattacharya
- Manoranjan Bhattacharya
- Kalipada Sarkar
- Rajlakshmi Devi
- Mohan Majumder
- Dipali Goswami
- Prafullabala

== Bibliography ==
- Gouranga Prasad Ghosh (1982). Sonar Dag (in Bengali). Vol. 1. Yogomaya Prakashani. ASIN B0B5RM7D37.
