= Anjangarh =

1948 Indian film

- Directed by: Bimal Roy
- Written by: M. Bajpai, Subodh Ghosh,(dialogue)
- Screenplay by: Gulshan Nanda
- Story by: Subodh Ghosh
- Produced by: B N Sircar
- Starring: Sunanda Banerjee; Purnendu Mukherjee; Hiralal
- Cinematography: Kamal Bose
- Edited by: Haridas Mahalanabis
- Music by: Rai Chand Boral
- Release date: 1948
- Country: India
- Languages: Hindi; Bengali

Anjangarh is a 1948 Indian drama film, directed by Bimal Roy. It stars Sunanda Bannerjee, Tulsi Chakraborty, Raja Ganguly, Hiralal, and Bipin Gupta. Dialogues were written by M Bajpayee.

== Cast ==
- Sunanda Bannerjee
- Tulsi Chakraborty
- Parul Kar
- Manorama Jr.
- Chhabi Roy
- Bipin Gupta
- Asit Sen
- Purnendu Mukherjee
- Jahar Roy
- Sunil Dasgupta
- Prafulla Mukherjee
- Ramakrishna Chatterjee
- Devi Mukherjee[B]
- Amita Basu[B]
- Phalguni Roy[B]
- Shankar Sen[B]
- Raja Ganguly[B]
- Kalipada Sarkar[B]
- Bhanu Bannerjee[B]
- Manoranjan Bhattacharya[B]
- Rama Nehru[H]
- Hirabai
- Herbi Senevirathana (Sinhala cinema actor) [H]
- Hiralal[H]
- Ajay Kumar[H]
- Raimohan[H]
- Bhupendra Kapoor[H]
