= Bandhan (1956 film) =

1956 film by Hemchandra Chunder

- Directed by: Hemchandra Chunder
- Written by: Benoy Chatterjee
- Produced by: Sircar Productions
- Starring: Meena Kumari; Pradeep Kumar; Motilal
- Cinematography: Sudhin Mazumdar
- Edited by: Kali Raha
- Music by: Hemant Kumar
- Release date: May 25, 1956
- Running time: 130 minutes
- Country: India
- Language: Hindi

Bandhan (transl. Bond) is a 1956 black and white Indian Hindi-language film starring Meena Kumari, Pradeep Kumar and Motilal in lead roles. The film was directed by Hemchander Chunder .

== Plot ==
In order to get their share of inheritance, Bani's parents have to get her married before she turns eighteen, to a suitable Brahmin boy, as per her grandfather's condition. Belonging to a rich and affluent family, she's married off to a poor but good-hearted preacher Amarnath. Will Bani accept her fate? All this and much more is to be expected from this family drama.

== Cast ==
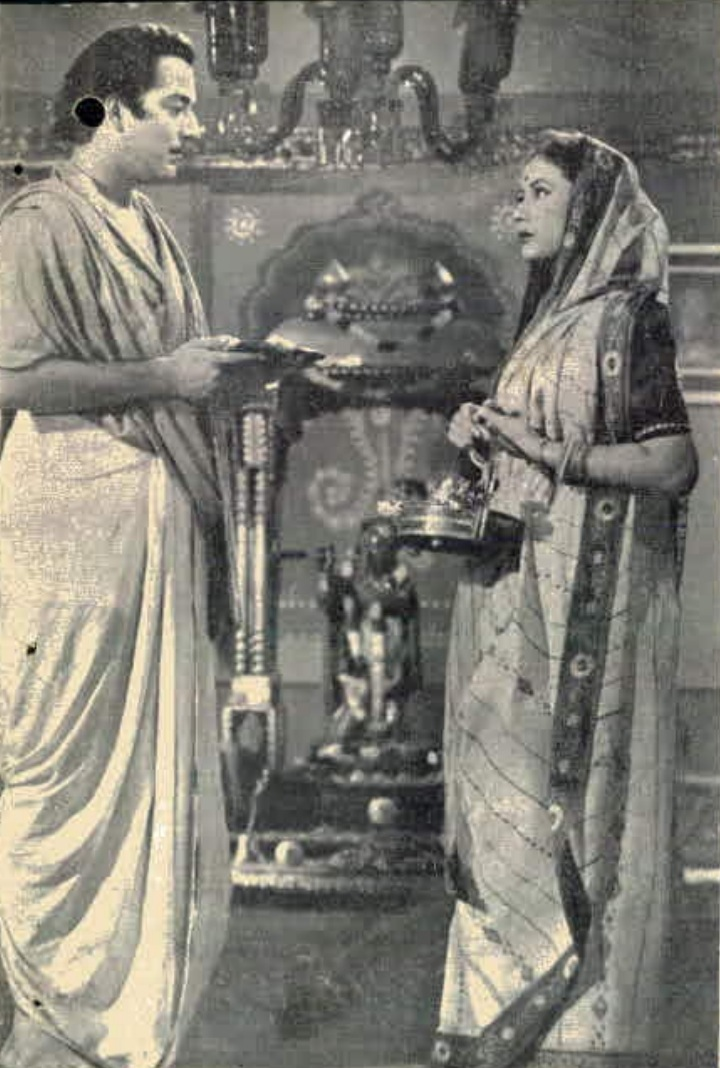
Actors Meena Kumari and Pradeep Kumar in a still from film.

- Meena Kumari as Bani
- Pradeep Kumar as Amarnath
- Motilal as Binod
- Asit Sen as Vijay
- Achala Sachdev as Rama
- Nana Palsikar as Acharya ji
- Shashikala as Shanta
- David
- Minoo Mumtaz
- Leela Mishra

== Accolades ==
- 1957: The film received an All India Certificate of Merit at 4th National Film Awards by the then President of India.

== Soundtrack ==
The film had seven songs in it. The music of the film was composed by Hemant Kumar. Rajendra Krishan wrote the lyrics.

1. "Dhool Mein Jaise" - Hemant Kumar
2. "Brindavan Ki Kunj Gali" - Lata Mangeshkar
3. "Jo Milna Hai Bhagwan Se" - Hemant Kumar
4. "Mere Devta Mujhko Dena Sahara" - Lata Mangeshkar
5. "Jaise Paani Chhupa Ghata Mein" - Hemant Kumar
6. "Hasino Ke Aankho Ke Dore Gulabi" - Asha Bhosle
7. "Dulah Ram Siya Dulhari" - Bela Mukherjee, Hemant Kumar
