= Tenali Raman (film) =

1956 film by B. S. Ranga

- Theatrical release poster
- Directed by: B. S. Ranga
- Screenplay by: B. S. Ranga; Kannadasan
- Based on: Tenali Ramakrishna by Ch. Venkataramaiah
- Produced by: B. S. Ranga
- Starring: Sivaji Ganesan; N. T. Rama Rao; V. Nagayya; P. Bhanumathi; Jamuna
- Cinematography: B. S. Ranga
- Edited by: P. G. Mohan
- Music by: Viswanathan–Ramamoorthy
- Production company: Vikram Productions
- Release date: 3 February 1956
- Running time: 169 minutes
- Country: India
- Language: Tamil

Tenali Raman is a 1956 Indian Tamil-language historical comedy film written and directed by B. S. Ranga, based on Ch. Venkataramaiah's play Tenali Ramakrishna. Produced for the banner Vikram Productions, the film stars Sivaji Ganesan, V. Nagayya, P. Bhanumathi, Jamuna and Thiruvengadam Chettiyar. Ranga also handled the cinematography while P. G. Mohan edited the film. Viswanathan–Ramamoorthy composed the soundtrack and background score.

Tenali Raman narrates the story of the 16th-century poet and scholar Tenali Rama, and his life as a member of the court of Krishnadevaraya, the king of Vijayanagara Empire. Raman, with his wits, manages to save Krishnadevaraya from the impending attacks of the Bahmani Sultanate against the Vijayanagara Empire. The rest of the film is about Raman's efforts to save Krishnadevaraya from courtesan Krishnasani, a spy and convincing emperor Babur against extending support to the Sultanate in the war.

Produced as a bilingual film, it was shot simultaneously in Tamil and Telugu with a slightly altered cast. Tenali Raman was filmed in and around Revathy Studios at Madras. It was released on 3 February 1956, nearly a month after the Telugu version Tenali Ramakrishna.

== Plot ==
During the reign of the Vijayanagara Empire, Raman is a poet and scholar whose talent is not recognised in his hometown Tenali. To earn a livelihood, he migrates to Hampi along with his wife Kamala and son Madhava. On his way to Hampi, he halts at a Kali temple where he is initially terrified looking at the goddess' idol and the animal sacrifices made to please her. That night, Kali appears before him and grants a boon: he would have to choose either wisdom or materialistic wealth. Raman opts for both, which angers Kali who warns that he might end up as a clownish poet whose wisdom is solely useful for entertaining others. Raman accepts it as a blessing and requests Kali to save him from further dangers, to which the goddess agrees and disappears.

Raman reaches Hampi and approaches Rajaguru, the royal priest of the Vijayanagara empire to find employment in the court of king Krishnadevaraya. Neither Rajaguru nor his assistants help him and he returns dejected. However, he finds an opportunity when Krishnadevaraya is unable to distribute 17 disputed elephants among three brothers as per their deceased father's will. Raman solves the problem and Krishnadevaraya appoints him as a court member. With his wit and loyalty, Raman soon earns the respect of all the court members, except Rajaguru who sees him as a problem.

The Deccan Sultans of Berar, Ahmednagar, Bidar, Bijapur, and Golconda decide to wage a war on Vijayanagara empire with united military forces. They send Kanakaraju, a spy, to Hampi where he meets Raman, who happens to be his distant relative. Some days later, Kanakaraju tries to assassinate Krishnadevaraya and Rajaguru blames Raman for giving shelter to a spy. As Raman is about to be killed as per the king's orders, he overhears a conversation between another spy and the court's astrologer. The spy bribes the astrologer to influence Krishnadevaraya in postponing the war on Bijapur so that they can have time for proper preparations. Raman escapes and meets Appaji with whose help he reveals the astrologer's intentions. The astrologer is killed and Rajaguru, who believed in him with good faith, is accused of trying to back stab the king. Raman intervenes and Rajaguru is saved, which improves their relation.

She kills herself preferring a dignifying death, and Raman wishes to leave for Delhi to convince emperor Babur from sending his elephantry to support the Sultanate in the war.

Raman reaches Delhi and meets Babur in the guise of an aged fakir and sings praises of him, until he empties all the gold coins he has. Babur then invites him to his palace to gift him properly. Raman goes to Babur's palace, and introduces himself as one of those innocent citizens of the Vijayanagara empire who shall suffer if Babur extends his support to the unjust Sultanate. Babur is convinced and calls off his elephantry back. Dismayed at the sudden turn of events, the Sultanate call off the war. Krishnadevaraya learns about Raman's efforts in stopping the war from Appaji. Remorseful, Krishnadevaraya invites Raman to rejoin the court, to which he agrees gladly.

== Cast ==
Male cast

- Sivaji Ganesan as Tenali Rama
- N. T. Rama Rao as Krishnadevaraya
- V. Nagayya as Appaji
- M. N. Nambiar as Rajaguru
- Master Venkateshwar as Raman's son
- Thiruvengadam Chettiyar as Sadayappa pillai

Female cast

- P. Bhanumathi as Krishna
- Jamuna as Kamala
- Surabhi Balasaraswathi as Radha
- Sandhya as Thirumalambal

== Production ==
=== Development ===
After the success of his first production venture Maa Gopi (1954), B. S. Ranga wished to produce and direct a historical film based on the life of the 16th century Telugu poet and scholar Tenali Rama, who was one of the Ashtadiggajas (a collective title given to the eight Telugu poets in the court of Krishnadevaraya, which literally translates to eight great elephants). He planned it as a bilingual film to be filmed simultaneously in Telugu and Tamil languages with a slightly altered cast. Ranga collaborated with Samudrala Sr., Kannadasan and Murugadasa on the basic script for both the versions. They decided to adapt Ch. Venkataramaiah's Kannada stage play Tenali Ramakrishna into a film, instead of following the script of H. M. Reddy's 1941 Telugu film of the same name. Ranga titled the film as Tenali Raman in Tamil, while Tenali Ramakrishna was chosen for the Telugu version. Tenali Raman was the second Tamil film based on Tenali Rama, after a 1938 film.

Venkataramaiah's play was comical in nature, and focused plainly on the life and times of Rama. Fearing that it would fail to translate on-screen effectively, Samudrala and Kannadasan decided to incorporate political elements during the rule of Krishnadevaraya. While Samudrala focused on the administrative aspects of Krishnadevaraya, Kannadasan opted to "humanise" the king by writing scenes related to his personal life and preferences. Tenali Raman was filmed in and around Revathy Studios at Madras, as the floors of Ranga's production company Vikram Studios were still under construction excluding the recording and projection theatres.

=== Cast and crew ===
Ranga cast Sivaji Ganesan to play Raman in Tamil with Akkineni Nageswara Rao replacing him in the Telugu version. N. T. Rama Rao and V. Nagayya were signed to play Krishnadevaraya and his minister. M. N. Nambiar played the role of the kingdom's royal priest and was replaced by Mukkamala in the Telugu version.

Ranga approached P. Bhanumathi to play Krishna. Initially disinterested, Bhanumathi accepted the offer keeping in view Ranga's association as a cinematographer for films produced by the former's production company Bharani Pictures. Surabhi Balasaraswathi, Jamuna and Master Venkateshwar were cast in key supporting roles.

Viswanathan–Ramamoorthy were signed to compose the soundtrack and background score for both the versions. In addition to directing, Ranga also worked as the director of photography. P. G. Mohan edited the film. Vali and Ganga were the art directors, while Chopra and Gopalakrishnan choreographed the dance sequences.

== Soundtrack ==
The soundtrack was composed by Viswanathan–Ramamoorthy.

Song	Singers	Lyrics
"Ulagellaam Unatharulaal Malarum"	P. Leela	M. K. Athamanathan
"Naattu Jananga Adaiyelam"	Karikkol Raju	Kannadasan
"Chandana Charchita Nila Kalebara"	P. Susheela	Geetha Govindam
"Ullaasam Thedum Ellorum Or Naal"	Ghantasala	Tamaizhmannan
"Ulagellaam Unatharulaal Malarum" (pathos)	P. Leela	M. K. Athamanathan
"Chittu Pole Mullai Mottuppole"	A. P. Komala	Kannadasan
"Aadum Kalaiyellam Paruva Mangaiyar Azhagu Koorum"	P. Leela	Kannadasan
"Thennavan Thaai Nattu Singaarame"	P. Susheela	Kannadasan
"Thangam Pogum Meni Undhan Sondham Ini"	R. Balasaraswathi Devi	Kannadasan
"Putrile Pambirukkum...Kottaiyile Oru Kaalatthile"	T. M. Soundararajan & V. Nagayya	Kannadasan
"Kangalil Adidum Penmaiyin Naadagam"	P. Bhanumathi	Kannadasan
"Kannamirandum Minnidum Annam"	P. Bhanumathi	Kannadasan
"Pirandha Naal Mannan Pirandha Naal"	P. Bhanumathi	Kannadasan
"Vinnulagil Minni Varum Thaaragaiye Po Po"	P. Bhanumathi	Kannadasan
"Adari Padarndha"	V. N. Sundharam	Kannadasan
"Ponnalla Porul"	V. N. Sundharam	Kannadasan
"Kannaa Pinnaa Mannaa"	V. N. Sundharam	Kannadasan
"Vindhiyam Vadakkaaga"	V. N. Sundharam	Kannadasan
"Chandhiran Pole"	V. N. Sundharam	Kannadasan
"Drru Drru Ena Madugal"	V. N. Sundharam	Kannadasan
"Thaadhi Thoodho Theedhu"	V. N. Sundharam	Kannadasan

== Release and reception ==
Tenali Raman was released on 3 February 1956, nearly a month after the Telugu version. Kannadasan published a still from the film showing Raman buried neck deep, waiting to be trampled by an elephant, with a caption describing it as Ganesan's future. The Hindu wrote, "It is a film which deserves to be seen.... It is a narrative well told, in terms of resourceful acting, (from [Sivaji] Ganesan in the central role in particular, and from others) attractive high flown language, and impressive backgrounds built with an eye to period." The Indian Express said, ".... is a very entertaining picture. Some of the songs in the classical style are pleasing. There are a few delightful dances which ought to enhance the entertainment value of the picture." The Mail said, "With witty dialogues, and a number of pleasing dances and songs the film is entertaining." The Screen said, "[Sivaji] Ganesan portrays the role of Tenali Raman extremely well. The film should appeal to all sections of picture-goers."

== Bibliography ==
- Rajadhyaksha, Ashish; Willemen, Paul (1998) [1994]. Encyclopaedia of Indian Cinema. British Film Institute and Oxford University Press. ISBN 0-19-563579-5.
