= Lakshmi Kumara Tatacharya =

Hindu saint and royal preceptor

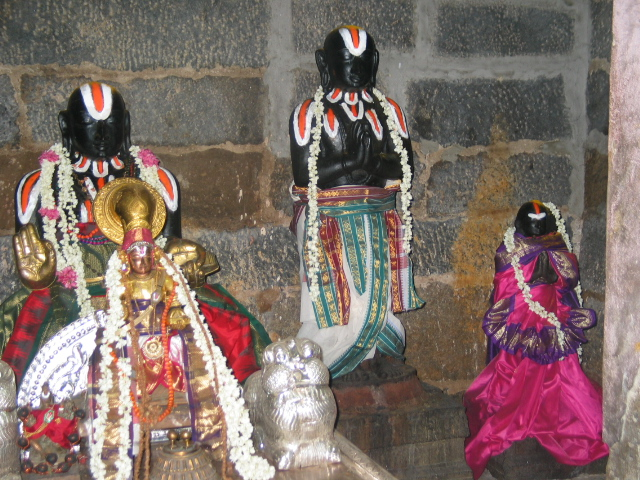
- Murtis of Lakshmi Kumara Tatacharya (centre) with his spouse (extreme right) and Vedanta Desika (extreme left) as in Kanchipuram
- Title: kōṭikannikā-dāna tirumalai eṭṭūr Immaḍi Rāyadurgam śrī Lakṣmī-Kumāra Tāta-Deśikan

Personal life
- Born: 3 December 1571 Kumbakonam
- Died: 3 December 1643 (aged 72) Kanchipuram
- Parents: Sundara Desika (father); Kanakavalli (mother)
- Notable work(s): Srimat Hanumad-Viṁśati, Nikama Parimalam, Lakshmi Niyudam, Panchagranthi Nipaharam, Satvika Brahmana Vidya Vilasa Parijata Apaharana, Sri Desika Prabandha Itu
- Relatives: Pañcamatabhañjanam Tātācārya (paternal uncle) Ananta Lakṣmī (daughter)

Religious life
- Religion: Hinduism

Lakshmi Kumara Tatacharya (Tamil: லக்ஷ்மீ குமார தாத்தாச்சாரியார்), (1571–1643) was a prominent saint and guru of the Sri Vaishnava tradition of Hinduism. He served as the rajaguru (royal preceptor) for a ruler of the Vijayanagara Empire, Venkatapati Raya. He was also the overseer of a number of sacred temples known as the Divya Desams, including Srirangam, Kanchipuram, Tirumala, Melkote, and Srivilliputtur.

== Biography ==
According to Sri Vaishnava tradition, Lakshmi Kumara Tatacharya is regarded to trace his descent from various acharyas of Sri Vaishnava philosophy such as Nathamuni, Ramanuja, and Tirumala Nambi. His father, Sundara Desika, and paternal uncle, Panchamata Bhanjanam Tatacharya, served as the royal preceptors of the emperor before he inherited their role.

During his role as the royal preceptor, he brought a large army from Vijayanagara and drove away unrighteous people from the Divya Desams of Srirangam, Kanchipuram, Srivilliputtur, Alagar Koyil, Kumbakonam and many other places and restored the ritual traditions of Ramanuja, as well as appointing overseers and offering grants to these sites. He is described to have gilded the mulavar vimanam (the pyramidal structure over the sanctum sanctorum) of Tirupati, Kanchipuram, and renovated the parts of the Srirangam Temple. He constructed the hundred-pillared mandapa of the Varadharaja Perumal Temple and renovated its shrines of the said temple, which records his work in its stone tablets.

Lakshmi Kumara Tatacharya offered his guidance to the rulers of the Vijayanagara Empire regarding matters of righteousness. He was the only person to hold the twin positions of rajaguru and chief minister of the state. He travelled all around the country for the purpose of educating people from various sections of society to follow the path of righteousness.

=== Tata Samudram ===
Lakshmi Kumara Tatacharya constructed a temple named Sri Sanjiviraya Temple in Ayyankar Kulam, a small village near Kanchipuram, venerating the deity Hanuman with a temple tank measuring more than 150 acres. This temple is more commonly known as Tata Samudram, literally meaning, 'the sea of Tata'. As part of a temple procession, the processional idol of the Varadharaja Perumal temple is brought to visit this temple once in a year during the festival named "Natabhavi Utsavam".

According to regional legend, Lakshmi Kumara Tatacharya was a pious devotee of Rama. Once, he was travelling to Kanchipuram with all the wealth he had acquired as a reward for his knowledge from various kings, with the intention of offering all of it to Varadharaja Perumal. On reaching the outskirts of the town, since it was late in the light, he decided to stay with his disciples, intending to resume his journey after sunrise. While his disciples and he slept, a group of thieves arrived to steal his riches. While they were doing so, a troop of monkeys, led by their leader, started to attack the thieves, after which they started to guard the riches. In a divine dream, Lakshmi Kumara Tatacharya was offered a vision of the incident and received a darshana (divine sight) from Hanuman. The preceptor realised that it had been the deity himself who had averted the robbery. Overwhelmed by devotion, he decided to spend a part of his wealth to build a temple for Hanuman along with Rama, Sita, and Lakshmana. He also built a large lake near the constructed temple and named it Sri Lakshmi Saras, in honour of the goddess Lakshmi.

Lakshmi Kumara Tatacharya also composed a famous literary work called Srimat Hanumat Vimshati in praise of Hanuman, which are inscribed on stone tablets and are kept in the prakarams (the circle enclosure surrounding the main temple) by the then ruler of the Vijayanagara Empire.

== Works ==
Lakshmi Kumara Tatacharya has composed a lot of literary works including Srimat Hanumat Vimshati, Nikama Parimalam, Sri Panduranga Mahatmyam, Sri Desika Prabandha Itu, and others in the languages of Sanskrit, Prakrit, and Tamil. These works are preserved in the libraries of Tirumala Tirupati Devasthanams. The work Sri Tata Vimshati, composed on the greatness of Lakshmi Kumara Tatacharya, records his various acts and deeds.

Lakshmi Kumara Tatacharya has also composed various literary works to substantiate various philosophical positions of Sri Vaishnavism. His devotion towards Ramanuja and Vedanta Desika could be ascertained from his works. The Sri Desika Prabandha Itu serves as a guide to the Tamil works of Vedanta Desika.

== Philosophy ==
Lakshmi Kumara Tatacharya followed the Vadakalai sect of Sri Vaishnavism and his thoughts were deeply rooted his works. He was a follower of Vedanta Desika. He was revered as an acharya mahanubhava, or virtuous instructor.

The key concepts of Ramanuja's Vishistadvaita: tattva, hita, and purushartha; upaya and upeya; chit, achit, and ishvara; karya and karana, are explored in most of the works of Lakshmi Kumara Tatacharya, such as Nikama Parimalam, Lakshmi Niyudam, Panchagranthi Nipaharam, Saptagranthi Nipaharam, and Sattvika Brahmana Vidya Vilasa.

== Legacy ==
Lakshmi Kumara Tatacharya has influenced the philosophers and saints of various Hindu traditions. The great contemporary writer and philosopher Appaya Dikshitar of Adayapalam praised Lakshmi Kumara Tatacharya in many of his works. He considered the guru to be of divine birth.

Lakshmi Kumara Tatacharya is extolled in the following verse:

Tasmai dharma svarūpaya, nirmalodhāra kīrtaye
Śrī Lakṣmī Kumāra Tatāchāryāya Deśikaya namo namaḥ

Salutations to the instructor Lakshmi Kumara Tatacharya, who is the embodiment of righteousness and the holder of virtue.

In the city of Kanchipuram, the Varadharaja Perumal Temple's Sri Vedanta Desikan Sannidhi houses a six-feet idol of Lakshmi Kumara Tatacharya along with his consort, Kamala Ammangar, depicted as paying homage to Vedanta Desika. Whenever the processional image of Varadharaja Perumal is taken for a temple procession, the images of Lakshmi Kumara Tatacharya and Vedanta Desika are offered the satari, a crown that represents the feet of Vishnu. The temple also houses the processional deity of the preceptor.

== Sources ==
- "Sri Tata Vimsadhi" by Sri Venkata Varadha Kavi – TTD library
- "guru paramparai prabhavam 6000 padi – Part 2 Aacharyargal Vaibhavam" Sri Parakala Mutt
- "Sri Lakshmi Kumarodhayam" a fifteenth-century work of Vijayanagara Kingdom
- "Sadamarshana Gothra Prabhavam" by Seva Srinivasa Raghavan
- The inscriptions found in various Temples of Tamil Nadu and Andhra Pradesh
