= Tenali Ramakrishna (film) =

1956 film by B. S. Ranga

- Theatrical release poster
- Directed by: B. S. Ranga
- Written by: Samudrala Sr. Kannadasan; Murugadasa
- Screenplay by: B. S. Ranga
- Based on: Tenali Ramakrishna by Ch. Venkataramaiah
- Produced by: B. S. Ranga
- Starring: N. T. Rama Rao; Akkineni Nageswara Rao; V. Nagayya; Bhanumathi Ramakrishna; Jamuna
- Cinematography: B. S. Ranga; B. N. Haridas
- Edited by: P. G. Mohan
- Music by: Viswanathan–Ramamoorthy
- Production company: Vikram Productions
- Release date: 12 January 1956
- Running time: 169 minutes
- Country: India
- Language: Telugu

Tenali Ramakrishna is a 1956 Indian Telugu-language political drama film produced and directed by B. S. Ranga based on Ch. Venkataramaiah's stage play of the same name. Produced for the banner Vikram Productions, it stars N. T. Rama Rao, Akkineni Nageswara Rao, V. Nagayya, P. Bhanumathi, and Jamuna. Ranga handled the cinematography with his brother-in-law B. N. Haridas while P. G. Mohan edited the film. Viswanathan–Ramamoorthy composed the soundtrack and background score.

Written by Samudrala Sr., Kannadasan, and Murugadasa, Tenali Ramakrishna narrates the story of the 16th-century Telugu poet and scholar of the same name, and his life as a member of the court of the Vijayanagara Empire ruler Krishnadevaraya. Using his wits, Ramakrishna manages to save Krishnadevaraya from attacks on his empire by the Bahmani Sultanate. The rest of the film is about Ramakrishna's efforts to save Krishnadevaraya from the courtesan Krishnasani, a spy, and convince Mughal Emperor Babur against extending support to the Bahmani Sultanate in the war against the Vijayanagarans.

Produced as a bilingual film shot simultaneously in the Telugu and Tamil languages with a slightly altered cast, Tenali Ramakrishna was filmed in and around Revathy Studios at Madras. It was released on 12 January 1956 to mixed reviews from critics who criticised the historical inaccuracies portrayed in the film. Tenali Ramakrishna was a commercial success, won the President's Silver medal for the Best Feature Film in Telugu and the All India Certificate of Merit for Best Feature Film at the 4th National Film Awards. Its Tamil version, titled Tenali Raman, featured Sivaji Ganesan as the protagonist and was released on 3 February 1956. Tenali Ramakrishna was later remade in Kannada as Hasyaratna Ramakrishna in 1982 by Ranga himself but it was a commercial failure.

== Plot ==
Ramakrishna, an unrecognised Telugu and Sanskrit scholar from Tenali, migrates to Hampi with his wife Kamala and son Madhava in search of employment. En route, he stops at a temple dedicated to the goddess Kali. Impressed by his courage and humour, Kali appears and asks him to choose between two offerings representing two boons: wisdom and wealth. Ramakrishna consumes both offerings, prompting Kali to warn him that he will be known as Vikatakavi (transl. jester poet) whose intellect primarily serves to entertain others. Ramakrishna accepts and requests protection from future dangers, which Kali grants.

Upon arriving in Hampi, Ramakrishna approaches Tatacharya, the royal priest of the Vijayanagara Empire, seeking an introduction to King Krishnadevaraya. Turned away by Tatacharya, Ramakrishna later gains an audience with the king after successfully resolving a complex inheritance dispute involving 17 elephants among three brothers. Impressed by his wit, Krishnadevaraya appoints him as a court poet. Ramakrishna earns the admiration of the court, though Tatacharya views him as a rival.

Concurrently, the Deccan sultanates plot an invasion of Vijayanagara and sends a spy, Kanakaraju, to Hampi. Kanakaraju visits Ramakrishna, who is his distant relative. When Kanakaraju attempts to assassinate Krishnadevaraya, Tatacharya accuses Ramakrishna of harbouring an enemy agent. Sentenced to execution, Ramakrishna overhears a conversation between another spy and the court's astrologer, revealing that the astrologer was bribed to advise the king against immediate military action. Ramakrishna escapes, exposes the treason with Prime Minister Timmarusu's assistance, and clears his name while also intervening to spare Tatacharya from wrongful blame.

The Bahmani Sultanate subsequently sends a courtesan, Krishnasani, to distract Krishandevaraya. Enamoured by her talent and charm, Krishnadevaraya neglects state affairs and restricts access to his chambers under threat of execution. Recognising the military threat posed by the Sultans, Ramakrishna attempts to alert the king by disguising himself as a woman, but is banished from the kingdom. Meanwhile, Krishnadevaraya's wife, Queen Tirumala Devi, falls gravely ill, leading him to realise his negligence. Ramakrishna enters Krishnasani's residence disguised as a saint and exposes her a spy leader; she commits suicide when cornered by soldiers.

To prevent Mughal Emperor Babur from sending his elephantry to support the Deccan Sultanates, Ramakrishna travels to Delhi disguised as a fakir. He earns Babur's favour through his poetry and convinces him that the invasion will harm innocent citizens, prompting Babur to withdraw his military support. Lacking reinforcements, the Deccan Sultanates abandon the war. Upon learning of Ramakrishna's diplomatic success from Timmarusu, Krishnadevaraya invites him back to Hampi and reinstates him in the royal court.

== Cast ==
Male actors

- N. T. Rama Rao as Sri Krishnadevaraya
- Akkineni Nageswara Rao as Tenali Ramakrishna
- V. Nagayya as Timmarusu
- Mukkamala as Tatacharya
- Vangara Venkata Subbaiah as Appanna, Tatacharya's assistant
- Master Venkateshwar as Madhava, Ramakrishna's son
- Mikkilineni as Kanakaraju
- Kamaraju as Babur

Female actors

- Bhanumathi Ramakrishna as Krishnasani
- Jamuna as Kamala, Ramakrishna's wife
- surabhi Balasaraswathi Devi as Radha
- Sandhya as Tirumala Devi
- Lakshmikantha as a street dancer
- Venkumamba as Ramakrishna's mother

== Production ==
=== Development ===
After the success of his first production venture Maa Gopi (1954), B. S. Ranga wished to produce and direct a historical film based on the life of the 16th century Telugu poet and scholar Tenali Ramakrishna, one of the Ashtadiggajas (a collective title given to the eight Telugu poets in the court of Krishnadevaraya, which literally translates as "eight great elephants"). He planned it as a bilingual film to be filmed simultaneously in the Telugu and Tamil languages but with a slightly altered cast. Ranga collaborated with Samudrala Sr., Kannadasan and Murugadasa on the basic script for both the versions. They decided to adapt Ch. Venkataramaiah's Kannada-language stage play Tenali Ramakrishna into the film, instead of following H. M. Reddy's script for the 1941 Telugu directorial of the same name. Ranga titled the film Tenali Raman in Tamil.

Venkataramaiah's play was comical in nature, and focused on the life and times of Ramakrishna. Fearing it would fail to translate on-screen effectively, Samudrala and Kannadasan decided to incorporate political elements during the rule of Krishnadevaraya. While Samudrala focused on the administrative aspects of Krishnadevaraya, Kannadasan opted to "humanise" the king by writing scenes related to his personal life and preferences. Tenali Ramakrishna was filmed in and around Revathy Studios in Madras, due to the floors of Ranga's production company Vikram Studios still being under construction. V. S. Rangachari, the film's associate director, assisted Ranga in directing the Telugu version.

=== Cast and crew ===
Ranga cast Akkineni Nageswara Rao to play Ramakrishna in Telugu, with Sivaji Ganesan replacing him in the Tamil version.N. T. Rama Rao and V. Nagayya were signed to play Krishnadevaraya and his minister Timmarusu, respectively. Mukkamala played the role of Tatacharya, the kingdom's royal priest. He was replaced by M. N. Nambiar in the Tamil version.

Ranga approached Bhanumathi Ramakrishna to play Krishnasani. Initially uninterested, Bhanumathi accepted the offer because of Ranga's association as a cinematographer for the films produced by her production company Bharani Pictures. Tenali Ramakrishna is the only film where Bhanumathi shared the screen simultaneously with both Rama Rao and Nageswara Rao. Vangara Venkata Subbaiah, Sandhya, R. Balasaraswathi Devi, Jamuna, Lakshmikantha, Venkumamba and Master Venkateshwar were cast in key supporting roles. Kamaraju appeared as Emperor Babur, and Mikkilineni made a brief appearance as Ramakrishna's relative Kanakaraju.

Viswanathan–Ramamoorthy were signed to compose the soundtrack and background score for both the versions. Ranga's brother-in-law B. N. Haridas worked as the cinematographer. However, Ranga was credited as the film's director of photography with Haridas. P. G. Mohan edited the film. Vali and Ganga were the art directors, and V. K. Srinivasan was the film's production manager. Chopra and Gopalakrishnan choreographed the dance sequences.

== Music ==
Viswanathan–Ramamoorthy composed the soundtrack and background score, with Samudrala penning the lyrics for the songs and poems. Ghantasala, Madhavapeddi Satyam, P. Leela, P. Susheela, Balasaraswathi and A. P. Komala were the soundtrack's playback singers. Bhanumathi provided vocals as the playback singer for the songs featuring her. The song "Chesedi Yemito" was composed using the Sindhu Bhairavi raga. "Neevega Raja Neevega" and "Jhan Jhan Kankanamulu" are based on the Shanmukhapriya and Shuddha Saveri ragas. The song "Chandana Charchita", an ashtapadi adapted from Gita Govinda written by the Sanskrit poet Jayadeva, was composed using the Mohanam raga. When Ghantasala refused to take money for the 14 poems he sang, Ranga went to his home and gave his wife Savithri Ghantasala one hundred rupees for each poem. Ramakoti, who played a washer man in the film, sang the song "Akathayipilla Mooka".

The soundtrack, marketed by His Master's Voice, was released on 1 December 1956. The songs received positive reviews from the critics after the film's release. A review dated 27 January 1956 in Swatantra said: "The songs help the film greatly, with all the singers performing very well, though the ones sung by Bhanumathi could have been much better [sic]". The reviewer also found the background score "generally effective", and "exceptional" at times. Zameen Raithu, in its review dated 10 February 1956, praised Samudrala for adapting Jayadeva's ashtapadi and other complicated poems and not "compromising" for the common audience to understand. However, the reviewer was critical of the grammatical and pronunciation errors made by the singers and actors in the film. The songs "Theerani Naa Korikale", "Chandana Charchita", "Jhan Jhan Kankanamulu", and "Gandupilli Menumarachi" gained popularity post release.

Track listing

All lyrics are written by Samudrala Sr..

No.	Title	Singers	Length
1.	"Chesedi Yemito"	Ghantasala	3:43
2.	"Chandana Charchitha"	P. Susheela	3:32
3.	"Tenali Ramakrishna" (Padyam)	Ghantasala, Madhavapeddi Satyam	18:00
4.	"Theerani Naa Korika"	Bhanumathi Ramakrishna	2:42
5.	"Jagamula Dayanele" (Part 1)	P. Leela	2:06
6.	"Ee Kaanthalu" (Padyam)	Ghantasala	0:30
7.	"Tharuna Sasanka" (Padyam)	A. P. Komala, Ghantasala	3:25
8.	"Ichchakaalu Neeku" (with Dialogues)	P. Leela, Madhavapeddi Satyam	3:53
9.	"Jhan Jhan Kankanamulu"	R. Balasaraswathi Devi	3:34
10.	"Kannulu Ninde"	Bhanumathi Ramakrishna	3:13
11.	"Jagamula Dayanele" (Part 2)	P. Leela	1:25
12.	"Neevega Raja Neevega"	Bhanumathi Ramakrishna	2:27
13.	"Hareram Gandupilli Menumarachi"	Ghantasala, V. Nagayya	2:28
14.	"Aakathayipilla Mooka"	Ramakoti	1:26
15.	"Tenali Ramakrishna" (Dialogues – Part 1)	Ghantasala, Akkineni Nageswara Rao, Jamuna, N. T. Rama Rao	19:12
16.	"Tenali Ramakrishna" (Dialogues – Part 2)	Ghantasala, Madhavapeddi Satyam, N. T. Rama Rao, Akkineni Nageswara Rao, Mukkamala, Vangara Venkata Subbaiah	16:58
Total length:			1:28:34

== Release ==
Tenali Ramakrishna was released on 12 January 1956, with an approximate total length of 18,292 feet (5,575 m) in 20 reels, with a running time of 169 minutes. Navayuga films distributed the film in the Vijayawada, Guntakal, and Madras areas. The Nizam area distribution rights were acquired by All India Corporation Limited. (Note: For film trade purposes, the Nizam region includes the three districts of Kalaburagi, Bidar, and Raichur in Karnataka and seven districts in the Marathwada region including Aurangabad, Latur, Nanded, Parbhani, Beed, Jalna and Osmanabad apart from the state of Telangana.) Due to technical issues, the film had a delayed theatrical release on 13 and 14 January 1956 in 13 centres across Telangana and Andhra Pradesh. Tenali Raman was released on 3 February 1956, with both the versions being commercially successful.

== Reception ==
The film received mixed reviews from critics. Swatantra, in its review dated 27 January 1956, wrote that the film was paced evenly until the end, and Samudrala's writing was one of the biggest strengths of the film. The reviewer praised Nageswara Rao's performance and dialogue delivery, but was critical of Rama Rao and Bhanumathi, noting that the latter was very "ill at ease" playing Krishnasani which was "surprising" given that the role was in her comfort zone. Zamin Ryot gave a negative review, writing that the film was disappointing and criticised the climax as the film's weakest link. In its review dated 10 February 1956, Zamin Ryot wrote that Ranga has a great vision which cannot be ignored, and an eye for subtle and innuendo-free comedy, calling Samudrala's writing and screenplay praiseworthy. The reviewer added that the characterisations were ill-developed, with Rama Rao and Nageswara Rao salvaging the film to an extent, though Bhanumathi struggled in portraying the grey shades with authenticity.

The film was also criticised for being historically inaccurate. Swatantra noted that Ramakrishna is given credit for solving the problem of distributing 17 disputed elephants among three brothers, though this was actually done by Timmarusu. Zamin Ryot was very critical of the portrayal of Ramakrishna as a staunch Sri Vaishnavite, while he was a Telugu Shaivite Brahmin with the alternate name Ramalinga. The reviewer noted that the depiction of the clean-shaven Ramakrishna, a 6000 Niyogi Brahmin by birth, was inaccurate for the period as Niyogis always sported a moustache in the 14th century.

== Accolades ==
Tenali Ramakrishna won the President's Silver medal for the Best Feature Film in Telugu and the All India Certificate of Merit for Best Feature Film at the 4th National Film Awards. The film was the second South Indian film to win the All India Certificate of Merit for Best Feature Film.

== Remake ==
Tenali Ramakrishna was remade by Ranga into the Kannada language again in 1982 as Hasyaratna Ramakrishna, starring Anant Nag and Srinath as Ramakrishna and Krishnadevaraya. Unlike the original, the remake was a commercial failure with critics specifying that the audience did not accept Ramakrishna dominating Krishnadevaraya throughout the film.
