= The Adventures of Tenali Raman =

- Also known as: Tenali Rama
- Genre: cartoon
- Written by: Ariel Prendergast
- Creative director: Roger Dondis
- Country of origin: India
- Original languages: Hindi; English
- No. of episodes: 26

Production
- Running time: 11 minutes
- Production company: Toonz India Ltd

Original release
- Release: 14 June – 13 December 2003

The Adventures of Tenali Raman is an Indian animated television series that premiered on Cartoon Network India on 14 June 2003. It was produced by Toonz Animation Studios, Trivandrum. Promoted with the tagline "Get Ready for the Rama Effect", the series aired every Saturday and Sunday on Cartoon Network in India.

The Adventures of Tenali Rama is the first Indian animated television series. It was available in English and Hindi languages on Cartoon Network. Shortly after that, it was made available in Tamil (Original dub for Cartoon Network) and also dubbed in Malayalam which was telecasted on Asianet in the same year but got stopped abruptly. It was redubbed once again in Tamil, Malayalam and Kannada when it was aired on Chutti TV, Kochu TV and Chintu TV respectively.

== Creation ==
Tenali Rama is a part of the Cartoon Network's localisation strategy for India. It was the fourth Indian produced animated series acquired by the network. Talking about the reasons for acquiring such India-centric animated series, Ian Diamond, senior vice-president and general manager, Turner Entertainment Networks Asia, said, "Providing content based on the Indian story-telling heritage is a critical mandate for Cartoon Network in its mission to contextualise the Network for our Indian audiences."

Roger Dondis, the creative director of the Tenali Raman series, recalled: "When I landed at the Toonz Animation Studios in 2001 they had the basic idea and several drawings. The folk tales of Tenali Raman were very short and many of them were not appropriate for modern cartoons so the scriptwriter Arial Prendergast had to take the basic idea and stretch it out. And we had to constantly hold meetings with our Indian colleagues to get the nuances just right."

Dan McHale, the animation director of the series, came to train the artists to do the in-betweens and clean up. He also did the voiceover of the character Raj Guru and the theme song for the series. He said, "Though I have done voices before this is the first time I have done the music." P. Jayakumar, Director of Operations, Toonz Animation, said, "To produce a half-hour animation episode in any of the studios in the United States costs around $300,000 and in an [sic] Hollywood Studio it costs around $500,000. While in India it only costs $60,000 to $70,000. The only problem is the quality of animation produced in India is not of international standards even now and many studios fail to make on time delivery. To overcome this problem, Toonz Animation ensures at least 10 percent of their staff has international exposure. These expatriates then train their Indian counterparts. Toonz has been able to curb costs by doing everything here in India, and the 26 episode series of Tenali Raman just cost $50,000 for two 11-minute episodes."

The series was also shown in France (at Cannes) where it was appreciated. A comic book edition of Tenali Raman was published by Penguin Books India.

== Characters ==
- Ramakrishna (Tenali Raman)
- King Krishnadevaraya
- Rajguruji Tattacharya
- Tingary
- Goddess Kali
- Princess Shobha
- Attakori Molla
- Appanna
- Krishnadevaraya's mother
- Tenali Raman's wife
- Sundari the cat
- Senapati
- Ayyapan
- Sir Nigel Strawson III

Villains

- Horse trader
- The Northern emperor
- Green raja
- The evil fakir
- Thieves

== See also ==
- List of Indian animated television series
- Akbar Birbal
