= Hemchander Chunder =

Indian filmmaker, film director, Writer and editor

Hemchandra Chunder
- Born: 1907; West Bengal, Bengal Presidency, British India
- Died: 4 December 1964 (aged 56–57); Rajgir. India
- Occupation: Filmmaker

Hemchandra Chunder (1924 – 04 December 1964) was an Indian filmmaker, film director, writer and editor, who directed all-time classics like Madh Bhare Nain, Chhoti Maa etc He also wrote stories and screenplays. He completed his intermediate course from St Xavier's College Kolkata then he admitted to the Presidency College. During his time at Presidency College, he was active in amateur theatre, collaborating with legendary figures like Sisir Bhaduri and Naresh Mitra.

== Death ==
Dutt died on December 04, 1964, at Rajgir due to heart attack.

== Selected filmography ==
1. Natun Fasal (Bengali) ● 1960
2. Manmoyee Girls' School (Bengali) ● 1958
3. Bandhan (1956 film) (Hindi) ● 1956
4. Madh Bhare Nain (Hindi) ● 1955
5. Teen Bhai (Hindi) ● 1955
6. Chitrangada (Bengali) ● 1954
7. Chhoti Maa (Hindi) ● 1952
8. Bishnupriya (Bengali) ● 1949
9. Pratibad (Bengali) ● 1948
10. Meri Bahen (Hindi) ● 1944
11. Wapas (Hindi) ● 1943
12. Saugandh (Hindi) ● 1942
13. Pratisruti (Bengali) ● 1941
14. Jawani Ki Reet (Hindi) ● 1939
15. Parajay (Hindi) ● 1939
16. Anath Ashram (Hindi) ● 1937
17. Karodpati(Hindi)● 1936
18. Karwan-E-Hayat (Urdu) ● 1935
