= Devi (1960 film) =

1960 Indian Bengali film

- Film Poster with Bengali Title
- Directed by: Satyajit Ray
- Written by: Prabhat Kumar Mukhopadhyay
- Produced by: Satyajit Ray
- Starring: Sharmila Tagore; Soumitra Chatterjee; Chhabi Biswas
- Cinematography: Subrata Mitra
- Edited by: Dulal Dutta
- Music by: Ali Akbar Khan
- Release date: 19 February 1960
- Running time: 93 minutes
- Country: India
- Language: Bengali

Devi (transl. Goddess) is a 1960 Indian Bengali-language drama film directed by Satyajit Ray, starring Sharmila Tagore, Soumitra Chatterjee, and Chhabi Biswas. It is based on a short story by Prabhat Kumar Mukhopadhyay. The plot follows a zamindar (Biswas) who believes that his daughter-in-law (Tagore) has revealed herself to be a Goddess incarnate in a dream.

== Plot ==
In rural Bengal in the 19th-century, the widowed zamindar Kalikinkar Roy, who is a devotee of the goddess Kali, lives in a mansion with servants and plenty of space for himself, his sons Taraprasad and Umaprasad, Taraprasad's wife Harasundari and son Khoka, and Umaprasad's wife Doyamoyee. After Durga puja, Umaprasad returns to Calcutta (Kolkata) to continue his schooling, which includes learning English, while Doyamoyee stays behind to help care for Khoka, with whom she has an almost-maternal bond, as well as Kalikinkar, who she helps with his daily prayers and rituals.

Kalikinkar has a dream in which the eyes of Kali and Doyamoyee merge, which he interprets as revealing that Doyamoyee is an incarnation of the goddess. He wakes her up and falls at her feet, and the passive Taraprasad follows suit, though Harasundari remains skeptical. The family priest is called and performs a ritual with smoke and bells. Doyamoyee faints, which Kalikinkar interprets as her going into a trance. When she wakes up, she asks Harasundari to write to Umaprasad.

Doyamoyee is moved to a more private part of the mansion and made to sit as an idol around which regular worship rituals are performed. A local beggar, having tried everything else he could think of, brings his unconscious grandson to her, and Kalikinkar suggests giving the boy some charanamrito (the water used to wash the goddess's feet) to drink. Umaprasad arrives during this process and, shocked by the whole scene, privately argues with his father. Kalikinkar questions his certainty briefly, but, when the sick boy opens his eyes, he feels it is proof of Doyamoyee's divinity.

That night, Umaprasad sneaks into Doyamoyee's room and asks her to leave with him. They make it to the riverbank, where there is a boat waiting, but Doyamoyee hesitates and becomes anxious. She has begun to wonder if maybe she is a goddess, and, afraid to leave, asks Umaprasad to take her home. Reluctantly, he complies and returns to Calcutta alone.

As word spreads about the "miracle" with the sick boy, Doyamoyee's following grows rapidly, and supplicants travel from afar to worship her. She sits stoically during the ceremonies, but her feelings of isolation grow. Even Khoka begins to avoid her.

One day, Khoka develops a high fever. Harasundari calls a doctor, and, though he is uncomfortable being there without Kalikinkar's knowledge, he agrees to return with some medicine. However, Taraprasad enters as the doctor is leaving, and he tells Kalikinkar what is going on. Kalikinkar brings Khoka to Doyamoyee and asks her to heal the boy, and, although Harasundari and Doyamoyee both have serious doubts that it is a good idea, they agree to go along with the plan to give Khoka some charanamrito and let Doyamoyee hold him that night. Khoka is dead in the morning.

Umaprasad returns home and finds Kalikinkar alone, weeping at the foot of a statue of Kali. He accuses his father of killing Khoka through his blind faith, and then says he intends to save his wife from the crushing burden of divinity, but he seems to be too late—he finds Doyamoyee getting dressed in her wedding attire, wide-eyed and saying they must leave before she is killed. She runs off into the mist, while Umaprasad calls after her.

== Cast ==
- Sharmila Tagore as Doyamoyee, Umaprasad's wife and Kalikinkar's daughter-in-law
- Soumitra Chatterjee as Umaprasad Roy, Doyamoyee's husband and Kalikinkar's younger son
- Chhabi Biswas as Kalikinkar Roy
- Karuna Banerjee as Harasundari, Taraprasad's wife
- Purnendu Mukherjee as Taraprasad Roy, Kalikinkar's elder son
- Arpan Chowdhury as Khoka, Taraprasad and Harasundari's son
- Anil Chatterjee as Bhudeb, Umaprasad's friend in Calcutta
- Mohammed Israil as Nibaran, a beggar who cares for his grandson
- Kali Sarkar as Professor Sarkar, who gives Umaprasad advice
- Khagesh Chakravarti as Kaviraj
- Santa Devi as Sarala
- Nagendranath Kabyabyakarantirtha as a priest

== Preservation ==
The Academy Film Archive preserved Devi in 1996.. A 4K restoration was released by The Criterion Collection on October 26, 2021.

== Critical reception and legacy ==
The film received critical acclaim upon its release. On the review aggregator website Rotten Tomatoes, 100% of 17 critics' reviews of the film are positive, with an average rating of 7.7/10.

Directors William Wyler and Elia Kazan described the film as "poetry on celluloid", and director Francis Ford Coppola considers Devi to be Ray's best work, calling it "a cinematic milestone".

The film was adapted into the opera The Goddess by Allen Shearer.

== Awards ==
National Film Awards

- 1960: President's silver medal for Best Feature Film in Bengali – Won

Cannes Film Festival

- 1962: Palme d'Or (Golden Palm) – Nominated

== Other credits ==
- Art direction: Bansi Chandragupta
- Sound designer: Durgadas Mitra
