= Tenali Rama =

16th-century Indian Telugu poet and scholar

Tenali Ramakrishna
- తెనాలి రామకృష్ణుడు
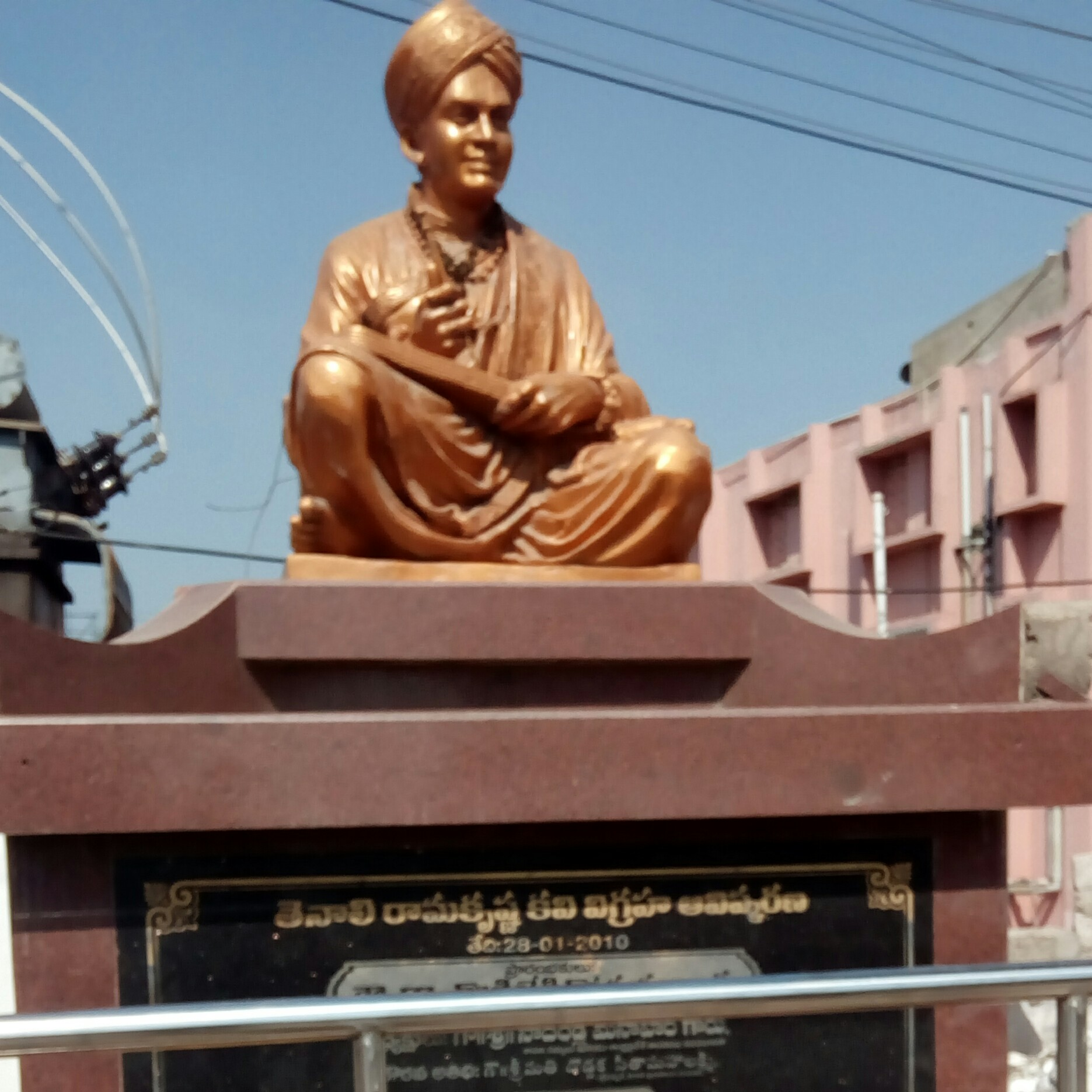
- Tenali Ramakrishna Statue in Tenali
- Born: Garlapati Ramakrishna; 16th century Tenali, Vijayanagara Empire (present-day Andhra Pradesh, India)
- Died: 16th century Vijayanagara
- Occupations: Poet, scholar, court advisor
- Writing career
- Language: Telugu, Sanskrit
- Period: 16th century
- Genres: Prabandha, Kavya, Cāṭu

Tenali Ramakrishna (born Garlapati Ramakrishna), also called Tenali Ramalinga and Tenali Rama, was a Telugu poet, scholar, and courtier of the Vijayanagara Empire in the sixteenth century. Born in Tenali in present-day Guntur district, Andhra Pradesh, he is traditionally counted among the Ashtadiggajas, the eight poets at the court of the Vijayanagara emperor Krishnadevaraya. Literary historians acknowledge him as a major classical prabandha poet whose literary career continued into the mid-to-late 16th century under later Vijayanagara rulers, although popular South Indian folklore primarily remembers him as a clever court jester and trickster under the moniker Vikatakavi.

== Life and career ==
Born in the early 16th century into a Niyogi Brahmin family, Ramakrishna spent his early years in Tenali before moving to Vijayanagara, the imperial capital. In his early years, he wrote poetry under the pen name Tenali Ramalinga and was a devout Shaivite. Later on, he converted to Vaishnavism, took on the name Ramakrishna, and dedicated his major major mature works to Vishnu and his manifestations.

Popular legend conflicts with the historical record over the timing of his court tenure. Internal textual evidence and dedications in his works suggest that he survived the fall of the Tuluva dynasty's golden age and flourished well into the second half of the 16th century, receiving patronage from later Aravidu dynasty rulers and nobles like Venkatapati Raya and Manuri Venkatadri, despite oral tradition placing him solely as a contemporary of Krishnadevaraya (r. 1509–1529).

== Literary works ==
Written in the classical Telugu prabandha tradition, Ramakrishna's extant works combine heavily Sanskritized diction and intricate metres with close attention to his characters' inner lives.

- Udbhataradhya Charitamu: Composed under his early Shaivite name, Ramalinga, the three-canto narrative poem combines a hagiography of the Shaiva preceptor Udbhata with a glorification of Varanasi.
- Panduranga Mahatmyam: This five-canto poem, regarded as his masterwork and counted among the Pancha Maha Kavyas (Five Great Kavyas) of Telugu literature, celebrates the shrine of Lord Panduranga at Pandharpur. The work, which is dedicated to Viruri Vedadri, is noted by critics for fusing subtle satire, vivid character studies, and devotional themes, especially in the episode featuring the dissolute Brahmin Nigama Sarma.
- Ghatikachala Mahatmyamu: A devotional poem dedicated to the Narasimha temple on Sholinghur's Ghatikachala hill.
- Attributed and associated works: Two additional poems attributed to him, Kandarpaketu Vilasamu and Harilila Vilasamu, survive only in fragments preserved within literary anthologies and commentaries, with no complete manuscripts extant.

== The cāṭu tradition and folklore ==
Ramakrishna also inspired a substantial body of oral folklore across the Deccan and South India. Within the Telugu literary tradition, he is noted for his cāṭu-extemporaneous verses transmitted orally that frequently satirized court scholars, ministers, and the monarch.

Over time, Ramakrishna merged with the pan-Indian archetype of the royal trickster, assuming a cultural role parallel to that of Birbal in Akbar's court and Gopal Bhar in Bengal. Across these oral tales and stray verses, he uses quick wit and wordplay to expose corruption, check royal arrogance, and outsmart rivals such as the royal priest Tatacharya.

== In popular culture ==
Folk tales about Tenali Ramakrishna have been adapted into films and television series. B. S. Ranga's 1956 bilingual biographical drama Tenali Ramakrishna —released in Tamil as Tenali Raman—stars Akkineni Nageswara Rao and Sivaji Ganesan in the title roles, respectively. On television, Hindi-language television series Tenali Rama , was aired from 2017 to 2020 and returned for a second season in 2024.
