= Telugu literature =

Body of works written in the Telugu language

Telugu literature includes poetry, short stories, novels, plays, and other works composed in Telugu. There is some indication that Telugu literature dates at least to the middle of the first millennium. The earliest extant works are from the 11th century when the Mahabharata was first translated to Telugu from Sanskrit by Nannaya. The language experienced a golden age under the patronage of the Vijayanagara Emperor-Poet Krishnadevaraya.

== Historiography ==
There are various sources available for information on early Telugu writers. Among these are the prologues to their poems, which followed the Sanskrit model by customarily giving a brief description of the writer, a history of the king to whom the book is dedicated, and a chronological list of the books he published. In addition, historical information is available from inscriptions that can be correlated with the poems; there are several grammars, treatises, and anthologies that provide illustrative stanzas; and there is also information available from the lives of the poets and the traditions that they followed.

== Subject matter ==
More popular works of Telugu literature are characterized by their descriptions of traditional Hindu knowledge systems such as Vedic astrology, the Arthashastra, grammar, moral aphorisms, and bhakti (devotional psalms) to deities within the Hindu pantheon. Telugu folk literature includes ballads and caste myths.

Early Telugu literature is predominantly religious. Poets and scholars drew most of their material from epics, such as the Ramayana, the Mahabharata, the Bhagavata and the Purāṇas, which they also translated. Religious literature consisted of biographies of the founders of religious traditions, their teachings, sāra, as well as commentaries, bhashya.

From the sixteenth century onwards, rarely known episodes from the Purāṇas would form the basis for the tradition of Telugu-language kavya (poetry). Literary works, drawn from episodes of the Purāṇas under the name Akhyana or Khanda, became popular along with depictions of the fortune of a single hero under the title of Charitra, Vijaya, Vilasa and Abhyudaya. In the eighteenth century, marriages of heroes under the title Parinaya, Kalyana and Vivāha became popular.

== Genres ==
=== Prabandham ===
Prabandham are stories in verse form with a tight metrical structure. These have three subtypes or sub-forms: Prakhyātam (Famous story), Utpadyam (fictional story), and Misramam (a mix of the two).

Ashtadiggajas have written in all three of the Prabandham genres during the Prabandha yugam.

=== Champu ===
Champu is a mixture of prose and poetry. Telugu literature uses an expression in verse called Champu, which mixes prose and poetry. Although it is the dominant literary form, there are exceptions: for example, Tikkana composed Uttara Ramayana entirely in verse.

=== Kavyam ===
- Kāvyam: Poem which usually begins with a short prayer called a Prarthana, containing initial auspicious letter "Sri" which invokes the blessings of the God. The occasion and circumstances under which the work is undertaken is next stated. The subtypes of Kāvyam are:
  - Padya kāvyam: Metrical poetry.
  - Gadya kāvyam: Prose poetry.
  - Khanda kāvyam: Short poems

=== Avadhanam ===
Avadhanam is a literary performance popular from the very ancient days in Sanskrit and more so in Telugu and Kannada languages. It requires a good memory and tests a person's capability of performing multiple tasks simultaneously. All the tasks are memory-intensive and demand an in-depth knowledge of literature, and prosody. The number of Prucchakas can be eight (for Ashtavadhanam) or 100 (Sataavadhaanam) or even 1,000 (for Sahasravadhanam). A person who has successfully performed Ashtavadhanam is called Ashtavadhani, one completing Satavadhanam is a Satavadhani, and after performing Sahasraavadhaanam is called Sahasravadhani.

Avadhānam involve the partial improvisation of poems using specific themes, metres, forms, or words.

New devices for the dissemination of knowledge among the people were developed in the form of the Dvipada and Sataka styles. Dvipada, sometimes written was dwipada, means 'two feet'—a couplet— and sataka means 'hundred'—signifying a cento of verses).

=== Dwipada ===
A dwipada is a couplet with a specific rhyme scheme. A stanza contains two short lines, each with less than fifteen characters. Longer poems, composed of many dwipada, can be composed with a "highly musical" effect. Much of the extant corpus in this form was written using the common language of the time. The form's musicality and accessibility made the form a natural fit for spreading religious messages. Palkuriki Somanatha the first to write in this form in the 12th or 13th century. His works Basava Puranam and Panditaradhya Charitra were "immensely singable" devotional works to Siva as Basaveswara. Influenced by Saivaite poets' use of dwipada, a Vaishnavite poet wrote the Ranganadha Ramayana, a version of the Ramayana that became incredibly popular for its singability, vernacular diction, and stories not found in Valmiki's version. The form reached its apex with Palnati Vira Charitra, popularly ascribed to the 14th century poet Srinatha. By the end of the Prabandha era, the three most important Sanskrit poems had been translated into Telugu in dwipada: the Mahabharata by Thimmaya, the Ramayana by Ranganadha, and the Bhagavatam by Tekumalla Ranga Sai. The form declined after the dwipada works of the early 17th century king-poet Raghunatha Nayak of Tanjore. Dwipada's accessibility has sometimes meant it was not a prestigious form of Telugu poetry. In the 19th century, scholar Charles Philip Brown noted "the learned despise couplets because the poems thus written are in a flowing easy style which uneducated persons read with enjoyment." Only a few writers today use it out of lingering respect its history.

=== Padam ===
Padams are lyric poems usually meant to be sung, with an opening line or lines called a pallavi, followed by three caranam verses, each of which is followed by the pallavi refrain. The padam is thus "a highly integrated, internally resonant syntactic and thematic unit." Annamacharya, the most famous composer of Telugu padams, is said to have composed a padam a day for the god of the Tirupati temple, Venkateswara. His poems, of which 13,000 survive on copper plates stored in the temple vaults, deal with the "infinite varieties and nuances of the god’s love life" and "his sense of himself as an agonized, turbulent human being in relation to the god he worships".

=== Chatu ===
Chatus (meaning "charming utterance") are remembered poems passed on by recitation. In premodern South India, literate people recited chatus to each other as a social pastime. Most of these poems have memorable stories that go along with them that explain and contextualize them. They have passed through a lively oral tradition for hundreds of years, and been anthologized since the 19th century by scholars like Veturi Prabhakara Sastri. Many chatus are attributed to Srinatha, Tenali Rama, and other famous poets. These attributions, most of which are unverifiable, serve to make both mythologize these poets and judge their relative merit. Once made legends, they're free to interact anachronistically in chatus. Poets from different eras meet, exchange poems, and critique each other. In sum, chatus, "moving from gnomic advice to metalinguistic criticism, through the domains of desire, social commentary, the articulation of cultural values, and critical taste, these interlocking stanzas embody an entire education, an expressive vision of life and poetry."

=== Satakamu ===
A satakamu literally means "an anthology of a hundred poems", but the number is usually somewhat higher, often an auspicious number like 108. Popular satakas include: the Sarvesvara, Kalahastisvara, and Dasarathi satakas.

- Vemana Satakam
- Sumathi Satakam
- Sri Kalahastishwara Satakam
- Dasarathi Satakam
- Bhaskara Satakam
- Kumara Satakam
- Narasimha Satakam
- Sarveswara Satakam
- Kumara Satakam
- Kumari Satakam
- Andhra Nayaka Satakam
- Sri Kishna Satakam
- Bharthruhari Neethi Satakam
- Bharthruhari Vyragya Satakam
- Bharthruhari Srungara Satakam
- Daksharama Bhimeswara Satakam

There are some satakas which are divided into ten groups of ten verses called dasaka which is adopted from Prakrit.

=== Sasanam ===
Śāsanams (Telugu: శాసనం) are historical inscriptions engraved on stone, copper plates, temple walls, and other durable media that record royal grants, land donations, edicts, genealogies, religious endowments, and social transactions. Although not formal literary works, śāsanams (inscriptions) provide some of the earliest evidence of the Telugu language, script, and literary style. In the Telugu region, some of the earliest known inscriptions in Telugu include the Kalamalla inscription (c. 575 CE), widely regarded as among the first records in the Telugu language, marking an early stage in the development of Telugu writing and linguistic identity. Copper-plate grants in Telugu from medieval dynasties such as the Eastern Chalukyas and Kakatiyas, reflect both administrative practice and cultural patronage. These śāsanams are crucial primary sources for reconstructing the linguistic evolution, script changes, and socio-political history of the Telugu-speaking regions, and they provide evidence of Telugu usage several centuries before many surviving literary works.

=== Other genres ===
- Novel: (Telugu: Navala) are written fictional prose narratives, normally longer than a short story.
- Katha: A style of religious storytelling.
- Nātakam: Drama.
- Naneelu: Epigrams.
- Nanolu: Nano poems

== Poetics ==
The Praudha Prabandha or Maha Kavya is considered the highest form of verse. The essentials of such a composition according to the Telugu poetic theory are:

- Śaili (style): The words chosen are neither soft nor very musical but gambhira ('dignified'); madhurya ('sweetness'); sukumara ('grace and delicacy'); saurabhya ('fragrance'); and symphony. Vulgar language (gramya) is avoided.
- Ṕāka (mould): Refers to the embodiment of ideas in language, and the nature and texture of the language employed. There are three types of pākas:
  - Drāksha (wine or grape): Draksha is a crystal clear style where everything is seen through a transparent medium. Mostly Nannayya and Karunasri use this mould.
  - Kadali (plantain): Kadali is a complex pāka because the soft skin has to peeled to reach the core of the subject. Mostly Tikkana Somayaji uses this mould.
  - Narikela (coconut): Narikela is the most difficult mould to employ because one has to break the rind to understand the idea. Amuktamalyada of Krishnadevaraya is cast in this pāka.

=== Rasa ===
- Rasa (aesthetic flavour): Rasa is the heart and soul of Telugu poetry. A sutram, or aphorism, Vākyam Rasātmakam Kāvyam, explains that the soul of a sentence is the rasa. There are nine, known as the nava rasas.
  - Śṛṅgāra (love)
  - Hāsya (comic)
  - Karuṇā (sympathy)
  - Raudram (horror)
  - Bhayānaka (fear)
  - Bībhatsa (disgust)
  - Vīra (heroic)
  - Adbhuta (wonder)
  - Santham (peace)

=== Alankara ===
- Alankāras (ornamentation) are used in description of events, places and proceedings. These include:
  - śabdhalankāras (ornaments of sound)
  - Slesha (double entendre)
  - yamaka (alliteration)
  - arthalankāras (ornaments of thoughts)
  - Upamāna (simile)
  - utpreksha (hyperbole)

== History ==
=== Early writers ===
==== The pre-Nannayya period (before 1020 AD) ====
In the earliest period, Telugu literature existed in the form of inscriptions, from around 575 AD. The first long inscription (sasanam) entirely in Telugu, dated to 575 CE, is attributed to the Renati Choda king Dhanunjaya and found in the Kadapa district. Early Telugu inscriptions provide some of the earliest evidence of the Telugu language, script, and literary style.

The 6th- or 7th-century Sanskrit text Janashrayi-Chhandovichiti (or Janāśraya-chandas) deals with the metres used in Telugu, including some metres that are not found in Sanskrit prosody. This indicates that Telugu poetry existed during or around the 6th century.

==== Addanki poetic inscription ====
Addanki inscription also known as the Pandaranga inscription belongs to 848AD, excavated near the Thousand Pillar Temple of Addanki. It is testimony to a flourishing Telugu literature much before the available literary texts. Locals believe that this is the first poem ever to be written in Telugu, also called the first Padya Sasanam (Poetic inscription) with (dvipada, with Yati and Prasa; style taruvoja). The poetic inscription talks about how when Pandaranga was staying with the Boya campaign, Pandaranga got victories in all military campaigns of his master Gunaga Vijayaditya III. The inscription spoke about the donation of land by the king to him for his successful military exploits.

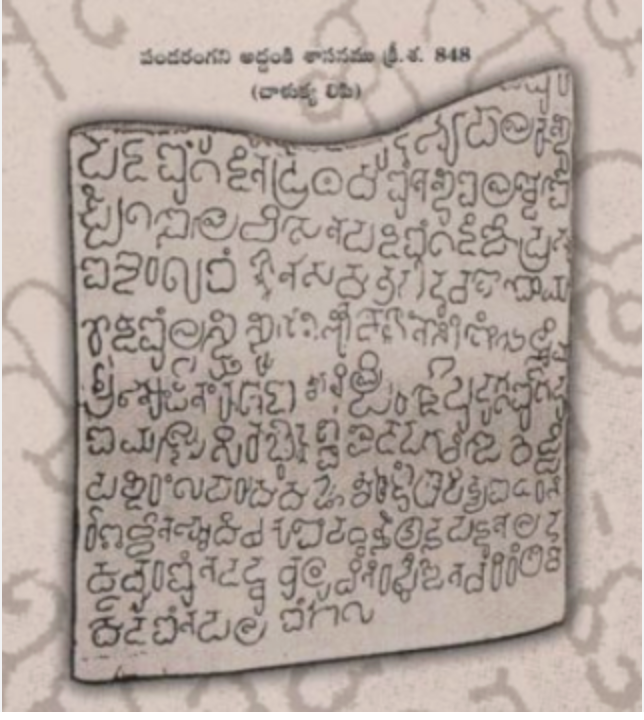
Addanki Poetic Inscription, 848 AD

==== Telugu Jain literature (850–1000 AD) ====
Historically, Vemulawada was a Jain knowledge hub and played a significant role in patronizing Jain literature and poets. 1980's excavations around Vemulawada revealed and affirmed the existence of Telugu Jain literature between 850-1000 AD.

==== Malliya Rechana ====
Malliya Rechana (940 CE) composed the first Telugu poetic prosody book Kavijanasrayam (pre-Nannayya chandassu) around 940 AD. This was a popular one and referred by many poets. There seems to be even an earlier prosody book by Rechana's guru Vaadindra Chudamani which is not available.

Veturi Prabhakara Sastry in 1900s mentioned the existence of Pre-Nannayya Chandassu in Raja Raja Narendra Pattabhisheka Sanchika. Accurate dating of this piece of literature happened after the 1980s discoveries in Karimnagar.

=== The Age of the Purāṇas (1020–1400 CE) ===
This is the period of Kavi Trayam or Trinity of Poets. Nannayya, Tikkana and Yerrapragada (or Errana) are known as the Kavi Trayam.

==== Nannaya Bhattarakudu, the Adi Kavi ====
Andhra Mahabharatam of Nannayya Bhattarakudu (Telugu: నన్నయ; 1022–1063 CE), is generally regarded as the first Telugu literary composition (Adi Kavyam) and Nannaya as the first poet (Adi Kavi) of Telugu language. His work, which is rendered in the Champu style, is chaste and polished and of a high literary merit. The advanced and well-developed language used by Nannaya suggests that prior Telugu literature other than royal grants and decrees must have existed before him. However, these presumed works are now lost. Nannaya completed the first two chapters and a part of the third chapter of the Mahābhārata epic, which is rendered in the Champu style.

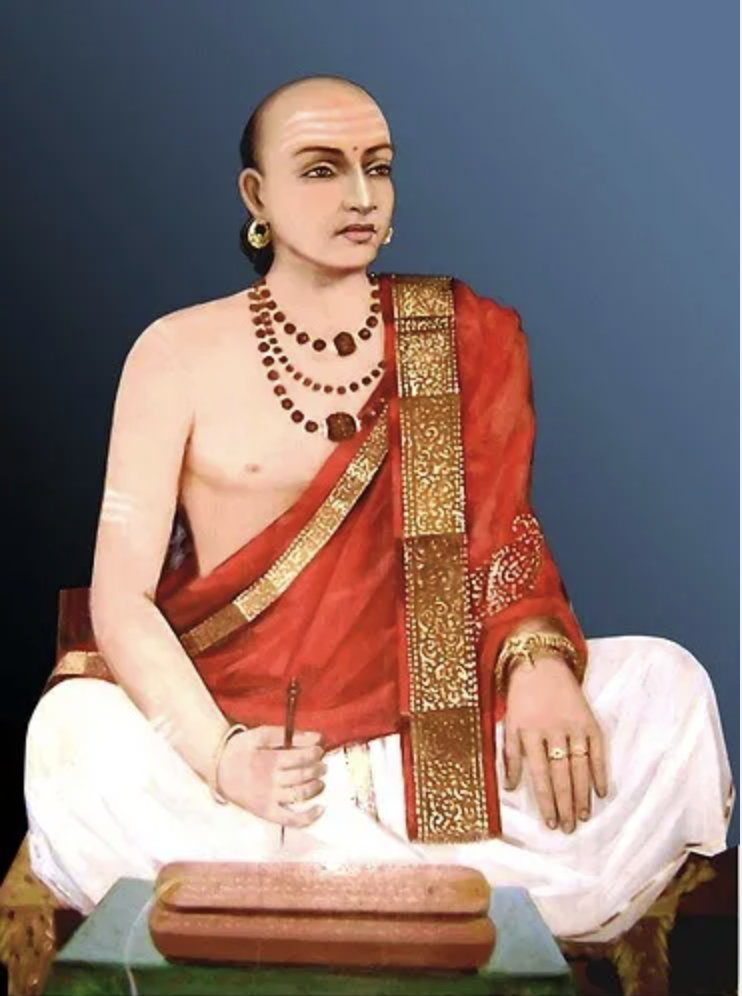
Adikavi Nannaya Bhattaraka

==== Tikkana Somayajulu ====
Nannaya's Andhra Mahabharatam was almost completed by Tikkana Somayaji (Telugu: తిక్కన సోమయాజులు; 1205–1288 CE) who wrote chapters 4 to 18.

==== Errapragada ====
Errapragada (Telugu: ఎర్రాప్రగడ) or Yerrapragada) who lived in the 14th century, finished the epic by completing the third chapter. He mimics Nannaya's style in the beginning, slowly changes tempo and finishes the chapter in the writing style of Tikkana. These three writers – Nannaya, Tikkana and Yerrapragada – are known as the Kavitraya ("three great poets") of Telugu. Other translations such as the Markandeya Puranam, by the disciple of Tikkana Somayaji, Marana; the Dasakumara Charita, by Ketana; and Yerrapragada's Harivamsam followed. Many scientific works, like Ganitasarasangrahamu by Pavuluri Mallana and Prakirnaganitamu by Eluganti Peddana, were written in the 12th century.

==== Baddena Bhupaludu ====
Sumati Satakam, which is a neeti ("moral"), is one of the most famous Telugu Satakams. Satakam is composed of more than a 100 padyalu (poems). According to many literary critics Sumati Satakam was composed by Baddena Bhupaludu (Telugu: బద్దెన భూపాల; 1220–1280 CE). He was also known as Bhadra Bhupala. He was a Chola prince and a vassal under the Kakatiya empress Rani Rudrama Devi, and a pupil of Tikkana. If we assume that the Sumati Satakam was indeed written by Baddena, it would rank as one of the earliest Satakams in Telugu along with the Vrushadhipa Satakam of Palkuriki Somanatha and the Sarveswara Satakam of Yathavakkula Annamayya. The Sumatee Satakam is also one of the earliest Telugu works to be translated into a European language, as C. P. Brown rendered it in English in the 1840s.

=== The Prabandha period (1400–1600 CE) ===
==== Srinatha ====
Srinatha (Telugu: శ్రీనాథుడు) (1365–1441) popularised the Prabandha style of composition. He was a minister in the court of Pedakomati Vemareddy of Kondaveedu and wrote Salivahana Saptasati, Sivaratri Mahatyam, Harivilasa, Bhimakanda, Kasi Khandam, Srungara Naishadham, Palanati Veera Charitra, Dhananjaya Vijayam, Srungara Dipika. These works were concerned with history and mythology. Srinatha's Srungara Naishadhamu is a well-known example of the form. Srinatha was widely regarded as the Kavi Sarvabhowma ("the emperor among poets").

==== Vemana ====
Kumaragiri Vema Reddy (Telugu: వేమన), popularly known as Yogi Vemana, was a 14th-century Telugu poet. His poems were written in the popular vernacular of Telugu, and are known for their use of simple language and native idioms. His poems discuss the subjects of Yoga, wisdom and morality. There is no consensus among scholars about the period in which Vemana lived. C.P. Brown, known for his research on Vemana, estimates the year of birth to be the year 1352 based on some of his verses. His poems are four lines in length. The fourth line is, in the majority of the cases, the chorus Viswadhabhirama Vinura Vema – he thus conveyed his message with three small lines written in a simple vernacular. He travelled widely across south India, acquiring popularity as a poet and Yogi. So high was the regard for Vemana that a popular Telugu saying goes 'Vemana's word is the word of the Vedas'. He is celebrated for his style of Chaatu padyam, a poem with a hidden meaning. Many lines of Vemana's poems are now colloquial phrases of the Telugu language. They end with the signature line Viswadhaabhi Raama, Vinura Vema, literally Beloved of Viswadha, listen Vema. There are many interpretations of what the last line signifies.

==== Bammera Potanaamatya ====
Bammera Potanaamatya (Telugu: బమ్మెర పోతన) (1450–1510) is best known for his translation of the Bhagavata Purana from Sanskrit to Telugu. His work, Andhra Maha Bhagavatamu. He was born into a Brahmin family and was considered to be a Sahaja Kavi ("natural poet") who needed no teacher. He wrote Bhogini Dandakam a poem praising king Singa Bhoopala's consort danseuse, Bhogini, while young. This is the earliest available Telugu Dandaka (a rhapsody which uses the same gana or foot throughout). His second work was Virabhadra Vijayamu which describes the adventures of Virabhadra, son of Siva. As a young man, he was a devotee of Siva and also Rama and was more interested in salvation, from which came the inspiration to translate the Bhagavata Purāṇas.

==== Annamacharya ====
Tallapaka Annamacharya (or Annamayya) (Telugu: శ్రీ తాళ్ళపాక అన్నమాచార్య) (9 May 1408 – 23 February 1503) is known as the Pada-kavita Pitaamaha of the Telugu language. He was born to a Vaidiki Brahmin family and his works are considered to have dominated and influenced the structure of Carnatic music compositions. Annamacharya is said to have composed as many as 32,000 sankeertanas (songs) on Bhagwaan Govinda Venkateswara, of which only about 12,000 are available today. His keertana compositions are based on the Visishtadvaita school of thought. Annamayya was educated in this system of Ramanuja by Sri Satagopa Yateendra of the Ahobila matham.

==== Tallapaka Tirumalamma ====
Tallapaka Tirumalamma (Telugu: తాళ్ళపాక తిరుమలమ్మ) (Annamacharya's wife) wrote Subhadra Kalyanam, and is considered the first female poet in Telugu literature. Her main work, Subhadra Kalyanam, which consists of 1170 poems, is about the marriage of Arjuna and Subhadra, who are characters that appear in the Mahabharata. She presented the Telugu nativity and culture in the story taken from Sanskrit epic.

==== Allasani Peddana ====
Allasani Peddana (Telugu: అల్లసాని పెద్దన) (15th and 16th centuries) was ranked as the foremost of the Ashtadiggajalu the title for the group of eight poets in the court of Krishnadevaraya, a ruler of the Vijayanagara Empire. Peddana was a native of Somandepalli near Anantapur. Allasani Peddana wrote the first major Prabandha and for this reason he is revered as Andhra Kavita Pitamaha ("the grand father of Telugu poetry"). It is believed that he was also a minister in the king's court and is hence sometimes referred as Peddanaamaatya (Peddana + Amaatya = Peddana, the minister). He wrote Swaarochisha Manu Sambhavam (also known as Manu Charitra), which is a development of an episode in the Markandeya Purāṇas relating to the birth of Svarochishamanu, who is one of the fourteen Manus. Pravarakhya is a pious Brahmin youth who goes to the Himalayas for Tapasya. In the Himalayas Varudhini, a Gandharva girl, falls in love with him, but Pravarakyudu rejects her love. Knowing this a Gandharva youth who was earlier rejected by Varudhini assumes the form of Pravarakhya and succeeds to win her love. To them is born Svarochisha, the father of Svarochishamanu. The theme for his Manu Charitra is a short story from Markandeya Purana. It is about second Manu of fourteen manus (fathers of mankind societies according to Hindu mythology), translated into Telugu from Sanskrit by Marana (1291–1323), disciple of Tikkana. The original story was around 150 poems and Peddana extended into six chapters with 600 poems by adding fiction and descriptions.

His work was treated as one of the Pancha Kavyas, the five best works in Telugu. Some of his other famous works such as Harikathaasaaramu are untraceable now.

==== Dhurjati ====
Dhurjati or Dhoorjati (Telugu: ధూర్జటి) (15th and 16th centuries) was a poet in the court of Krishnadevaraya and was one of the 'Ashtadiggajalu'. He was born to Singamma and Narayana in Sri Kalahasti and was the grandson of Jakkayya. His works include Sri Kalahasteeswara Mahatyam (The grace or miracles of Siva) and Sri Kalahasteeswara Satakam (100+ poems in the praise of Siva). Dhurjati took themes from Purāṇas and added local stories and myths in his work. Unlike contemporaries such as Peddana and Mallana, who chose the stories of kings, he chose devotion as his theme. Krishnadevaraya praised Dhurjati, saying "Stuti mati yaina Andhrakavi Dhurjati palkulakelagalgeno yetulita madhuri mahima...." (How is Dhurjati's poetry so immeasurably beautiful). He was known as Pedda Dhurjati ("Elder Dhurjati") as there were four other people from the same family line who went by the name of Dhurjati during the same period and after him. His grandson Venkataraya Dhurjati, wrote Indumati Parinayam ("Marriage of Indumati"), a story from Kalidasa's Raghuvamsa.

==== Krishnadevaraya ====
Krishnadevaraya (Telugu: శ్రీ కృష్ణదేవరాయ) was an emperor of Vijayanagara Kingdom. Literary activities flourished during the rule of the Vijayanagara dynasty, and the period of Krishnadevaraya's rule in the sixteenth century is considered to be the golden age of Telugu literature. Krishnadevaraya, a poet himself, introduced the Prabandha to Telugu literature. Amukta Malyada. Krishna Deva Raya wrote the book Amuktamalyada in Telugu, describing the pangs of separation suffered by Andal (an incarnation of the goddess Mahalakshmi. He describes Andal's physical beauty in thirty verses; using descriptions of the spring and the monsoon as metaphors. As elsewhere in Indian poetry, the sensual pleasure of union extends beyond the physical level and becomes a path to, and a metaphor for, spirituality and ultimate union with the divine. His court had the Ashtadiggajas ("eight elephants"), who were considered to be the greatest of poets of that time. Some critics dismiss the following period, dominated by prabandhas, as a decadent age. Of the dozens of works of the eighteenth- to mid-nineteenth century, Kankanti Paparaju's Uttara Ramayana in campu style, and the play Vishnumayavilasa stand out. Other genres bloomed at the same time. Yakshaganas, indigenous dramas of song and prose, were also produced.

==== Tenali Ramakrishna ====
Garlapati Tenali Ramakrishna (Telugu: గార్లపాటి తెనాలి రామకృష్ణ), popularly known as Tenali Rama and Vikata Kavi, was another sixteenth-century court poet of the Vijayanagara empire and also one of the Ashtadiggajas. His family had originally hailed from Tenali in Guntur district, he was born in a Telugu Niyogi Brahmin family. His famous work Panduranga Mahatyamu is one among the Pancha Kavyas. He dedicated that to Viruri Vedadri. This book is about the Pundarika Kshetram on the banks of river Bhaimi and its legend. He also composed Udbhataradhya Charitram on the story of Udbhata, a monk, as well as Ghatikachala Mahatyam about Ghatikachalam, a place of worship for God Narasimha near Vellore. He followed the Prabandha style. He took the theme for Panduranga Mahatyam from the Skanda Purana and enhanced it with many stories about the devotees of God Vitthala (Panduranga). He is noted for brilliance and wit and for mocking other poets and great personalities. He created a celebrated character called Nigama Sarma akka (sister of Nigama Sarma) and a story about her without giving her a name. He also had written many Chatuvu (extempore poems).

=== The post-Prabandha period (1600–1850) ===
==== Kasula Purushottama Kavi ====
Kasula Purushottama Kavi was a Telugu poet who lived during the late 18th century (fl. CE 1798). He hailed from the Diviseema area of Krishna District, Andhra Pradesh and was a court poet of the then-Raja of Challapalli, Yarlagadda Ankineedu Prasad I (r. 1792–1819) of the Challapalli Samasthanam and possibly of his father as well. Purushottama Kavi is recognized for composing literary works in Telugu consisting of one hundred poetic stanzas, known as satakams. Kasula Purushottama Kavi is known for composing the Andhra Nayaka Satakam on Srikakula Andhra Mahavishnu Kasula Purushottama Kavi also composed Hamsaladeevi Gopala Satakam, Manasa Bodha Satakam, Bhakta Kalpadruma Satakam, and Venugopala Satakam.

==== Mulugu Papayaradhya ====
Mulugu Papayaradhya, also known as Mulugu Papayya or Sangameswara Sastry, (1778 – 1852) was a Telugu and Sanskrit scholar, preceptor, translator, and writer, known for his translation of the Devi Bhagavatam from Sanskrit into Telugu and for being the preceptor and court poet of the Raja of Amavarati, Vasireddy Venkatadri Nayudu. Mulugu Papayaradhya was born to Viranaradhya and Akkamba. He is known to have written more than a hundred works in Telugu and Sanskrit. He was titled as Abhinava Kalidasa. He was a Veera Saivite acharya (preceptor).

Mulugu Papayaradhya is regarded as the first poet to translate the Devi-Bhagavata Purana into Telugu. From the more than hundred works he wrote, Kalyanacampu, Ekadasivratacampu, Aryasati, Sivastotra, and Vedantasarasangraha are among the more prominent works. Papayaradhya also wrote the Ahalya Sankrandana Vilasamu.

==== Kshetrayya ====
Kshetrayya or Kshetragna (Telugu: క్షేత్రయ్య) (c. 1600–1680 CE) was a prolific poet and composer of Carnatic music. He lived in the area of Andhra Pradesh. He composed a number of padams and keertanas, the prevalent formats of his time. He is credited with more than 4000 compositions, although only a handful have survived. He composed his songs on his favourite deity Krishna (Gopala) in Telugu. He perfected the padam format that is still being used today. His padams are sung in dance (Bharatanatyam and Kuchipudi) and music recitals. A unique feature of his padams is the practice of singing the anupallavi first then the pallavi (second verse followed by first verse). Most of the padams are of the theme of longing for the coming of the Krishna. He wrote with Sringara as a main theme in expressing madhurabhakti (devotion to the supreme). Sringara is a motif where the mundane sexual relationship between a Nayaki (woman) and a Nayaka (man) is used as a metaphor, denoting the yearning of jeeva (usually depicted as the Nayaki) to unite with the divine (usually depicted as the man). In most of his compositions, Kshetrayya has used the mudra (signature) "Muvva Gopala" as a reference to himself, which is also a name for Krishna in Kshetrayya's village Muvva, now called as Movva. Kshetrayya's work has played a major role in influencing poetry, dance, music of the South Indian tradition. Kshetrayya was intimately connected with the devadasi women of the temples of south India, who were the subject of many of his compositions. The devadasis were traditionally in possession of the musical/poetic interpretations of his work for a long period of time till the devadasi system was abolished and the compositions became more accepted in the musical community as valuable works of art. The musical community also owes a lot to Veena Dhanammal and T. Brinda, who popularised Kshetrayya's songs with their beautiful musical interpretation. Kshetrayya's padyams now form an integral part of the dance and musical traditions of South India, where his songs are rendered purely as musical works or as accompaniments to dance.

==== Kaluve Veera Raju ====
A prose translation by Kaluve Veera Raju which appeared hundred years later (ca 1700) had good success. He was the army chief under Chikka Deva Raya (1672–1704) of the Mysore Kingdom.

==== Kancherla Gopanna ====
Kancherla Gopanna (Telugu: కంచెర్ల గోపన్న; c. 1620 – c. 1680 CE), popularly known as Bhadradri Ramadasu or Bhadrachala Ramadasu (Telugu: భద్రాచల రామదాసు), was a 17th-century Indian devotee of Rama and a composer of Carnatic music. He is one among the famous vaggeyakaras (same person being the writer and composer of a song) in the Telugu language. His devotional lyrics to Rama are famous in South Indian classical music as Ramadaasu Keertanalu. Even the doyen of South Indian classical music Saint Thyagaraja learned and later improved the style now considered standard kriti form of music composition. He also has written Dasarathi Satakamu a collection of nearly 100 poems dedicated to the son of Dasaratha, an avatar of Rama.

==== Venkamamba ====
Tarikonda Venkamamba (Telugu: తరికొండ వెంకమాంబ; alternate spelling: Vengamamba, born 1730) was a poet and staunch devotee of Venkateswara in the 18th century. She wrote numerous poems and songs.

==== Tyagaraja ====
Tyagaraja or Tyagabrahmam (Telugu: కాకర్ల త్యాగబ్రహ్మం) (1767–1847) of Tanjore composed devotional songs in Telugu, which form a big part of the repertoire of Carnatic music. In addition to nearly 600 compositions (kritis), Tyagaraja composed two musical plays in Telugu, the Prahalada Bhakti Vijayam and the Nauka Charitam. Prahlada Bhakti Vijayam is in five acts with 45 kritis set in 28 ragas and 138 verses, in different metres in Telugu. Nauka Charitam is a shorter play in one act with 21 kritis set in 13 ragas and 43 verses. The latter is the most popular of Tyagaraja's operas, and is a creation of the composer's own imagination and has no basis in the Bhagavata Purāṇa. Often overlooked is the fact that Tyagaraja's works are some of the best and most beautiful literary expressions in Telugu language. Valmiki composed the Ramayana, the story of Rama, with 24,000 verses and also composed 24,000 kritis in praise of the lord.

==== Paravastu Chinnayasuri ====
Paravastu Chinnayasuri (Telugu: పరవస్తు చిన్నయ సూరి) (1807–1861) has been called the greatest grammarian and first Telugu head of Madras University. He wrote Baala Vyaakaranamu, which was the universally compulsory grammar textbook for students of all ages and education levels. Other notable works of his include Neeti Chandrika, Sootandhra Vyaakaranamu, Andhra Dhatumoola and Neeti Sangrahamu. Chinnayasuri translated Mitra Labham and Mitra Bhedam from the Sanskrit Panchatantra as Neeti Chandrika. Kandukuri Veeresalingam and Kokkonda Venkata Ratnam Pantulu followed his style of prose writing and wrote Vigrahamu and Sandhi in a different pattern.

== Modern period ==
The period of modern Telugu literature began with Gurajada Apparao, who changed the face of Telugu poetry with his Muthayala Saralu, and was perfected by later writers in the Romanticism era including Rayaprolu and Devulapalli Krishna Sastri. Gurajada's attempt to reform Telugu poetry by shedding old rules and styles reached a zenith with Sri Sri. SriSri's famous work "Maha Prastanam" is an instant hit with every corners of society. Many writers followed his style and continue to enrich the literature.

=== Contemporary poets ===
==== Kandukuri Veeresalingam ====
Kandukuri Veeresalingam (Telugu: కందుకూరి వీరేశలింగం; also known as Kandukuri Veeresalingam Pantulu: కందుకూరి వీరేశలింగం పంతులు; 16 April 1848 – 27 May 1919) was a social reformer of Andhra Pradesh. He was born in an orthodox Andhra Brahmin family. He is widely considered as the man who first brought about a renaissance in Telugu people and Telugu literature. He was influenced by the ideals of Brahmo Samaj particularly those of Keshab Chandra Sen. Veeresalingam Panthulu is popularly called Gadya Tikkana. He wrote about 100 books between 1869 and 1919 and introduced the essay, biography, autobiography and the novel into Telugu literature. His Satyavati Charitam was the first social novel in Telugu. He wrote Rajasekhara Charitamu inspired by Oliver Goldsmith's The Vicar of Wakefied. To him literature was an instrument to fight social evils.

==== Acharya Rayaprolu Subba Rao ====
Rayaprolu Subba Rao (1892–1984) was among the pioneers of modern Telugu literature. He is known as Abhinava Nannaya. He was recipient of Sahitya Akademi Award to Telugu Writers for his poetic work Misra Manjari in 1965. He was inspired by the Western literary movement and brought romanticism into Telugu literature by breaking away from the traditional translations of Sanskrit literature.Subbarayudu. He introduced the concept of Amalina Shringara Tatvamu into Telugu literature.

One patriotic verse by Subba Rao, "Edesamegina Endukalidina" (also known as "Janmabhumi"), is a perennial favourite, being regularly sung and recited. It was particularly popular for public events in the pre-Independence Andhra region. The verse has been adapted many times into song for use in Telugu films.

==== Mangalampalli Balamurali Krishna ====
Mangalampalli Balamurali Krishna (Telugu: మంగళంపల్లి బాలమురళీకృష్ణ) (born 6 July 1930) is a Carnatic vocalist, multi-instrumentalist and a playback singer. He is also acclaimed as a poet, composer and respected for his knowledge of Carnatic Music. Balamuralikrishna was born in Sankaraguptam, East Godavari District, Andhra Pradesh state. Dr Balamuralikrishna has composed over 400 compositions in various languages like Telugu and Sanskrit. His compositions range from Devotional to Varnams, Kirtis, Javalis, and Thillans. His greatest achievement is the compositions in all the fundamental 72 melakarta ragas.

==== Aatreya ====
Aacharya Aatreya (Telugu: ఆచార్య ఆత్రేయ) or Kilambi Venkata Narasimhacharyulu (7 May 1921 – 13 September 1989) was a playwright, lyrics and story writer of the Telugu film industry. He was born as Kilambi Venkata Narasimhacharyulu on 7 May 1921 in the Mangalampadu village of Sullurpeta Mandalam in the Nellore district of Andhra Pradesh. His pen name is based on their family Gotra. Known for his poetry on the human soul and heart, he was given the title 'Manasu Kavi'(Poet of Heart), which can be rewritten as 'Mana Su Kavi'(Our Good Poet). His poetry is philosophical and intellectually satisfying.

==== Tripuraneni Ramaswamy ====
Tripuranēni Rāmasvāmi (15 January 1887 – 16 January 1943) was a lawyer, famous poet, playwright and reformer active among the Telugu-speaking people. Popularly known as Kaviraju, he is considered the first poet to introduce rationalism and humanism into Telugu poetry and literature. Ramaswamy chose literary writing as the vehicle for expressing his rationalist thoughts. His famous work 'Sutaparanam' in four cantos was a fierce attack on the ancient Purāṇas, he has attained the state of excellence in poetic and literary criticism. His poetic work "Kuppuswamy Satakam" reveals the theme of social revolution and talks about social evils, blind faith, and indignity to man. He was against Congress and its fight against independence. In his other works such as "Sambhukavadha", "Suthasrama geetaalu', 'Dhoorta maanava', 'Khooni', 'Bhagavadgita', 'Rana Pratap' and 'Kondaveeti patanam', he made a rational analysis of dogmas prescribed by ancient classics and the injustice these dogmas did to people belonging to the lower social orders. Moreover, he attacked discriminatory practices and fought against the idea of untouchability. Sambhuka Vadha created a lot of controversies. Sambhuka was a character who did tapas to go heaven with the live body before death. That was considered as adharma and was killed by Rama. This story was interpreted that Brahmins do not like doing tapas by non-Brahmins, which is why Sabhuka was killed.

== Awards ==
- Sahitya Akademi Award for Telugu – The award given by India's national academy of letters for writing in Telugu.
- Ismail Award – Established in 2005, the award is given every year for a poet's debut book.
- CP Brown Award – Given every year to translators or others have worked to promote the Telugu language.

== Political movements ==
The Paryavaran Kavitodyamam movement started in 2008. It states its aims as being to bring awareness and concern among not only the elite class but also the masses through creative forms of literature. The Jagruthi Kiran Foundation initiated it under the leadership of Narayanam Narasimha Murthy, popularly known as Vidyavachaspati. The movement has literary activities including Harita Kata. Various poets and writers on environment have produced literature for the movement, with over 500 writers participating in the Jagruthi Kiran Foundation. Magazines such as Malle Teega and Kadhakeli are associated with the Jagruthi Kiran Foundation.

== Popular authors and works ==
- Arudra (ఆరుద్ర) – Samagraandhra Saahityamu (సమగ్రాంధ్ర సాహిత్యము) (The Complete Telugu Literature)
- Adavi Baapiraju – Gona Gannareddy, Naarayanarao, Tuphaanu (The storm), Amsumati
- Addepalli Ramamohana Rao – Poga choorina Aakasam
- Ajanta – Penumarti Viswanatha Sastry (born 1922)
- Allasani Peddana – Manu Charitra (The History of Swarochisha Manu)
- Acharya Aatreya – NGO, Kappalu
- Avasarala Ramakrishna Rao (1931–2011) – Sampengalu-Sannajajulu
- Atukuri Molla – Molla Ramayanam
- Bammera Potana – Bhagavata Purana
- Buchchibabu – Chivaraku Migiledi (What is Left at the End)
- Balivada Kanta Rao (1927–2000) – Balivada Kanta Rao Kathalu (Winner of the Kendriya Sahitya Academy Award Awarded in 1998 by the Government of India)
- Bondalapati Sivaramakrishna – Sampoorna Sarat Sahityam ( Published by Desi Kavita Mandali )
- Boyi Bhimanna – Gudiselu Kaalipotunnaayi
- C. Narayanareddy – Viswambhara ( Won the Jnanpith Award for this novel in the year 1988 )
- Cha So (1915–1993)
- Chalam – Chitraangi, Maidhaanam, Saavitri, Janaki, Ameena, Brahmaneekam, Musings
- Chilakamarti Lakshmi Narasimham – Gayopaakhyaanam, Prahasanamulu
- Daasarathi Krishnamacharyulu – Timiramuto samaramu (Fighting against the darkness)
- Devarakonda Balagangadhara Tilak – Tilak Kathalu, Amrutam Kurisina Raatri
- Dhurjati – Srikaalahasteesvara Satakam
- Duvvoori Ramireddy – Paanasaala, Krusheevaludu
- Devulapalli Krishnasastri – Krishna pakshamu (The Brightening Fortnight)
- Garikapati Narasimha Rao – Saagara Ghosha (Boisterousness of Ocean)
- Gona Budda Reddy- Ranganatha Ramayanam
- Gurajada Apparao – Kanyaasulkamu
- Gurram Jashuva – Gabbilamu (The Bat), Firadausi
- Kaloji- Naa Godava, Idee Naa Godava (Autobiography)
- Kandukuri Veeresalingam – Andhrakavula Charitra (The History of Andhra Poets), Raajasekhara Charitra (The History of Rajasekhara),
- Kanety Krishna Menon – KRATUVU
- Jandhyala Papayya Sastry – UdayaSri, VijayaSri, KarunaSri, Amarkhyam, Telugubala
- Kasula Purushottama Kavi – Andhranayaka Satakamu
- Kavitrayam (Nannayya, Tikkana, Yerrapragada) – Andhra Mahaabhaaratamu (The Great Mahabharata in Telugu)
- Kethu Viswanathareddy – Kethu Viswanathareddy Kathalu
- KNY Patanjali – Gopatrudu, Khaki Vanam, Veera Bobbili
- Ko Ku – Chaduvu
- Kondaveeti Venkatakavi – Nehru Charitra
- Madhurantakam Rajaram – Halikulu Kusalama
- Malladi Venkata Krishna Murthy – Written 153 novels, over 3000 Short Stories and 8 Travelogues covering 33 countries
- Mallikarjuna Panditaradhyudu -- Śivatatvasāramu (First independent work in Telugu)
- Mokkapati Narasimha Sastry – Barrister Parvateesam
- Muddupalani – Radhika Santvanamu
- Mullapudi Venkata Ramana – Budugu, Girisam malli puttadu
- Muppala Ranganayakamma – Raamayana Vishavruksham, Krishnaveni, Sweet home, Janaki Vimukti, Ammaki Adivaram Leda
- Nandoori Subbarao – Yenki paatalu
- Nanne Choadudu – Kumaara Sambhavamu
- Nayani Krishnakumari – Telugu geya vanjmayamu, Agniputri, Kashmira deepakalika
- Nannayya – Andhra Mahabharatam
- Palkuriki Somanatha -- Basava purana, Paṇḍitārādhyacaritamu
- Panchagnula Adinarayana Sastry – Arya Bharathi Granthamala.
- Panuganti Lakshminarasimha Rao – Narmada purukitsiyamu (1902), Sarangadhara (1904), Vijaya raghavamu (1909), Raathi sthambhamu (1930), Ramaraju (1948)
- Papineni Sivasankar – Stabdhata-Chalanam (1984), Oka Saaramsam Kosam (1990), Aku Pacchani Lokamlo (1998), Oka Khadgam-Oka Pushpam (2004), Rajani Gandha (2013), Mattigunde (1992), Sagam Terichina Talupu (2008), Sahityam-Moulika bhavanalu (1996), Nisamta (2008), Thallee Ninnu Dalanchi (2012), Dravadhuikata (2015), Maha Swapnikudu (2016)
- Paravasthu Chinnayasuri – Baalavyaakaranamu, Neeti chandrika
- Rallapalli Ananta Krishna Sharma- Meerabai (1913), Taradevi (1911) (both Khanda Kavya's), Natakopanyasamulu, Vemana (1928–29), Saraswatalokamu (1954) (critical review articles), Salivahana Gathasaptasati Saramu (translation of the Prakrit work into Telugu) (1932), Chayapa Senaniya, Nrita Ratnavali (Translation into Telugu, 1969), Arya (Translation of Sundara Pandya's Sanskrit work in Telugu, 1970).
- Ravuri Bharadwaja – Paakudu Raallu received the Jnanpith Award 2012
- Rayaprolu Subba Rao Abhinava Nannaya received the Saahitya Academy Award in 1965
- Sankaramanchi Satyam – Amaravati Kathalu (The Stories from Amaravati)
- Sri Krishna Deva Raya – Amuktamalyada
- Sri Sri – Maha Prasthanam
- Sri K Sabha – Viswarupa Sandarsanam, Vedabhumi, Mogili, Patala Ganga
- Srinatha – Haravilaasamu, Kaasikhandamu, Bhimakhandamu, Palnaati veeracharitra, Sŕngaara naishadhamu
- Suravaram Pratapareddy – Aandhrula Saanghika Charitra
- Tallapaka Annamacharya (1424?-1503) – Annamacharya kirtanas
- Tapi dharma Rao 'Vidhi Vilasam', 'Devala paina bootu bommalu, Pelli- Dani Puttupurvottaralu, and film script Rojulu marayi
- Tallapaka Timmakka – Subhadrakalyanam
- Tarigonda Venkamamba – Venkatachala Mahatmyamu, Vasista Ramamyanamu, Rajayogasaramu, Bhagavatamu, Krishnamanjari
- Tenali Ramakrishna – Paanduranga maahaatmyamu
- Tenneti Hemalata – Raktapankhamu, Mohanavamsi, Omar Khayyam
- Tikkana – Nirvachanottara Raamayanamu -
- Tirupati Venkata Kavulu – Paandavodyoga vijayamulu, Devi bhaagavatamu
- Tirumalamba – Varadambika parinayamu
- Thiruvarangam Sudhakar – Sudhakara kavitha jyotsna
- Tripuraneni Ramaswamy Choudhury – Sutapuranamu, Karempudi kathanamu, Kurukshetra sangramamu, Kuppuswamy Satakamu, Sambhukavadha, Sutasrama geetalu, Dhoorta manava, Khooni, Bhagavadgita, Rana Pratap, Kondaveeti patanam
- Tripuraneni Maharadhi – Samagraha Praanam
- Ushasri – Sundarakanda
- Viswanatha Satyanarayana – Cheliyalikatta, Kalpavrukshamu, Kinnerasaani Paatalu, Srimadraamaayana Kalpavŕukshamu, Swargaaniki Nichchenalu, Veyipadagalu, Ekaveera, Naa ramudu, Nepala rajavamsa kathalu (In Telugu he is the first writer to receive Jnanpith Award for the novel Ramayana Kalpavrukshamu in the year 1970)
- Vegunta Mohan Prasad – Chiti Chinta, Rahastantri, Punarapi, Saandhya Basha
- Vemana – Vemana Satakam
- Vempalli Gangadhar – Molakala Punnami
- Yenugu Lakshmana Kavi – Bhartruhari Subhashitamulu
- Yerrapragada – Harivansamu, Nrusimhapuranamu, half of the Aranya Parva of Mahabharata

== See also ==
- Chatuva
- Telugu development
- Telugu poetry
- List of Telugu poets from India
- Epic of Katamaraju
