= Barrister Parvateesam (film) =

1940 film

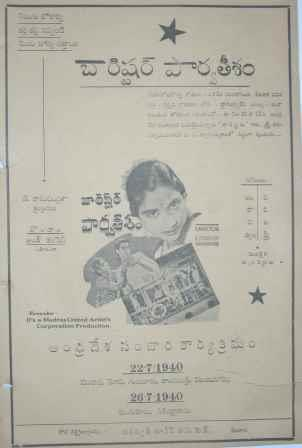
- Baristor Parvatesam (1940) Poster
- Directed by: H. M. Reddy
- Story by: Mokkapati Narasimha Sastry
- Starring: Lanka Satyam; G. Varalakshmi; Kasturi Sivarao; L. V. Prasad
- Music by: Kopparapu Subba Rao
- Production company: Motion Pictures Producers Combines
- Release date: 7 August 1940
- Country: India
- Language: Telugu

Barrister Parvateesam is a 1940 Indian Telugu-language comedy drama film directed by H. M. Reddy. It is based on the Telugu novel of the same name (1924) written by Mokkapati Narasimha Sastry.

== Casting ==
The title role of Parvateesam is played by Lanka Satyam. This was his second film. His first was Amma, directed by Niranjan Pal. He worked as assistant to director R. Prakash. G. Varalakshmi got the female lead role unexpectedly. Director Prakash saw her, when she was acting in the stage play Sakkubai in Rajahmundry, called her for a make-up test, and gave her the role of wife of Parvateesam. She was 12 years old. She sang two songs in the film. Kasturi Sivarao did two roles as a dentist and a rickshaw puller.
