= Venkata Ratnam =

Venkata Ratnam or Venkataratnam is a given name. Notable people with the given name include:

- Kakani Venkata Ratnam (died 1972), former Cabinet Minister in Andhra Pradesh, India
- Kokkonda Venkata Ratnam Pantulu, a well-known Telugu and Sanskrit writer
- Raghupathi Venkataratnam Naidu (1862–1939), Indian social reformer
