= Dhurjati =

Indian poet and Ashtadiggaja in the imperial court

Ashtadiggaja Dhurjati దూర్జటి
- Born: Srikalahasti, Pottapi Nadu, India.
- Occupation: Poet
- Parent: Narayana (father) Singamma (mother)
- Writing career
- Language: Telugu
- Period: Prabandha Period
- Notable works: Sri Kalahasteeswara Mahatyam; Sri Kalahasteeswara Satakam

Mahakavi Dhurjati (Telugu: దూర్జటి; c. 15th and 16th centuries CE) was a Telugu poet and an Ashtadiggaja in the imperial court of the Emperor Krishnadevaraya of Vijayanagara.

== Biography ==
Dhurjati was born in Srikalahasti. In his works, Dhurjati referred to his birthplace as being a part of Pottapi Nadu in reference to a Telugu Chola Kingdom based at Pottapi in Cuddapah. He was the son of Singamma and Narayana and grandson of Jakkayya.

He was a devotee of Shiva.

He was known as Pedda Dhurjati (lit. 'the Elder Dhurjati') as there were four other people from the same family line who went by the name of Dhurjati during the same period and after him. His grandson Venkataraya Dhurjati wrote Indumati Parinayam (lit. 'the marriage of Indumati'), a story from Kalidasa's Raghuvamsa.

== Works ==
The works of Dhurjati dedicated to Shiva, referred to as the Srikalahastiswara (lit. 'the lord of Srikalahasti'). His famous works include the Sri Kalahasteeshwara Mahatyam (lit. 'The glory of the Lord of Srikalahasti') and Kalahastisvara Satakamu (lit. 'Over a hundred poems in the praise of the Lord of Srikalahasti').

He is also credited with many chatuvus, stand-alone extempore poems.

== Style ==
Like his contemporaries during the Vijayanagara Empire's Prabandha period, he has taken themes from the Puranas and added regional lore to them in his works. Unlike some of his contemporaries like Peddana and Mallana, who have chosen the stories of monarchs for their works, he choose faith as the central theme of his poetry.

Krishnadevaraya described his poetry with "Stutimati yaina Andhrakavi Dhurjati palkulakelagalgeno atulita madhuri mahima...." (lit. 'How is Dhurjati's poetry so immeasurably beautiful').
