= Vempalli Gangadhar =

Researcher, poet, and writer

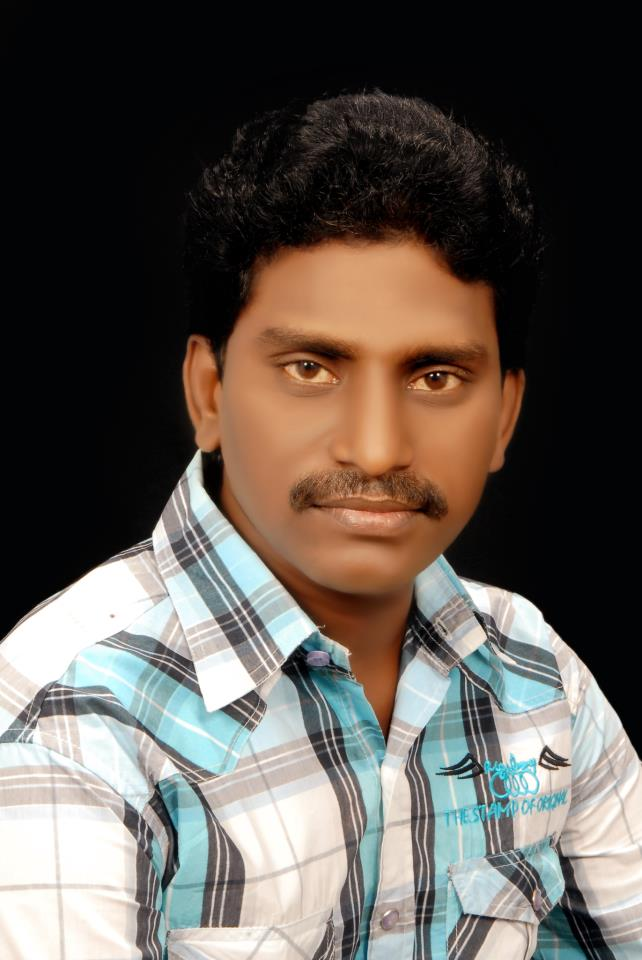
- Occupations: Writer, poet, researcher
- Writing career
- Period: Present
- Website: vempalligangadhar.com

Vempalli Gangadhar is a writer from Kadapa district of Andhra Pradesh. He has been awarded Sahitya Akademi's Yuva Puraskar for 2011 for his short-story collection "Molakala Punnami".

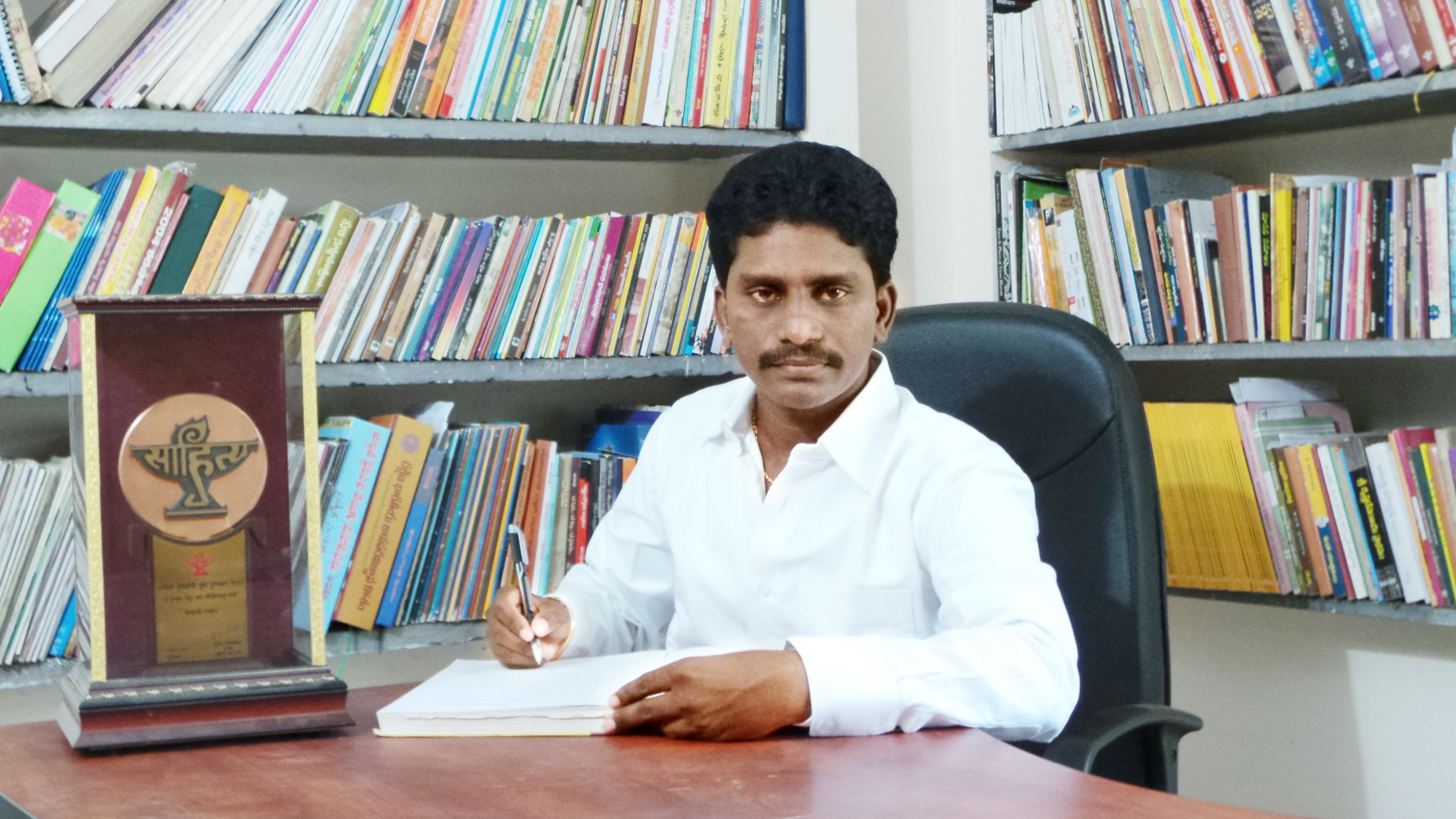
Dr Vempalli Gangadhar, with his Sahitya Akademi Award.

Gangadhar, recipient of Central Sahitya Academy's first Yuva Puraskar, had been a guest of the President in Rashtrapathi Bhavan from 8 to 26 September 2014.

== Writings ==
=== Molakala Punnami ===
Gangadhar's award-winning book Molakala Punnami is a collection of 13 short-stories. It was published in 2006 and is woven around the plight of farmers. Gunturu Seshendra Sarma, a Telugu poet, has written the foreword for the book.

=== Other works ===
Gangadhar, a doctorate holder from the Sri Venkateswara University, has ten books to his name so far. He has also won an award for a previous work. His Mynapu Bommalu won the American Telugu Association award. The book is about sex workers.

=== Published books ===
- Gangamma Poolu (15 Stories) గంగమ్మ పూలు (కథా సంపుటి ) November, 2024
- Depamanu (Telugu Literature Articles) దీపమాను(సాహిత్య వ్యాసాలు) June 2020
- Matti porala madhya maha charithra (History articles) మట్టి పొరల మధ్య మహా చరిత్ర (చరిత్ర వ్యాసాలు) June 2020
- C.P.Brown series of Letters సి.పి. బ్రౌన్ కు మనమేం చేశాం? (సంపాదకత్వం) (book editor) May 2020
- Urenium palle (Novel) (యురేనియం పల్లె) July 2019
- Erra chandanam Dari lo Tamila Kulilu (Red Sanders Tamil woodcutters) (ఎర్రచందనం దారిలో తమిళకూలీలు) May 2019
- Anathapuram Charithra అనంత పురం చరిత్ర (సంపాదకత్వం) (book editor) January 2017
- Ravana Vahanam Kathalu (Ravana Vahanam - 25 stories) రావణ వాహనం కథలు December 2015
- Paapagni kathalu (Stories of the Paapagni River - 30 Stories) పాపాఘ్ని కథలు June 2015
- Nenu Chusina shantinekethan నేను చూసిన శాంతినికేతన్ (పర్యటన)(Travelogue) January 2015
- Toli telugu shasanam (The first Telugu stone inscription) తొలి తెలుగు శాసనం December 2013
- Greeshma Bhoomi Kathalu (Stories of the summer land - 13 Stories) గ్రీష్మ భూమి కథలు November 2013
- Nela digina vaana (The rain that landed on earth - Novel) నేల దిగిన వాన March 2013
- Devarashila (The divine rock - 12 Stories) దేవరశిల November 2008
- Hiranya rajyam (The kingdom of Hirnya - Rayalaseema factionism history) హిరణ్య రాజ్యం August 2008
- Pune prayanam (The journey to Pune - Trafficking of Women) పూణే ప్రయాణం June 2007
- Molakala punnami (The full moon of sprouts - 13 Stories) మొలకల పున్నమి April 2006; second edition April 2012
- Kadapa Vibhavam కడప వైభవం-కడప చరిత్ర (సంపాదకత్వం)(book editor) 2004
- Kathanam (narration - essays book) కథనం November 2002

=== Novels ===
- Nela digina vaana నేల దిగిన వాన (The rain that landed on earth)
- Urenium palle యురేనియం పల్లె (Novel)

=== Short stories ===
- Agra Tonga - ఆగ్రా టాంగా (What is to be really seen in Agra?)
- Hamsa Nattu - హంస నత్తు (We finally reach where we are destined to reach)
- Edari Oda - ఎడారి ఓడ (What is wrong when done with greed can be right when done in need)

== Awards ==
- A.P. cultural council Award in literary criticism 1999
- A.P.cultural council Award in media writing 2001
- A.P.cultural council Award in play writing 2003
- Cuddapah district kadapothsavalu souvenir co-ordinatior Award 2003
- Republic day district best writer Award 2003
- Katha – New Delhi, Telugu story National Award 2003
- Republic day District best story writer Award 2004
- Cuddapah District kadapothsavalu souvenir co-ordinator Award 2004
- ATA (American Telugu Association) Story Award 2004
- Cuddapah District kadapothsavalu Souvenir co-ordinator Award 2005
- Republic day district best media writer Award 2005
- Kadapa 200 years festival publicity co-ordinator Award 2007
- Vipula – Telugu magazine story Award 2007
- R.S. Krishna Murthy foundation Award 2007
- Teja news weekly first Telugu story Award 2008
- Gurajada appa rao Sahithi Puraskaram 2008
- Sahithya netram Telugu Story Award 2008
- Vishala Sahiti’ B.S. Ramulu Katha Puraskaram 2009
- Hasan fathima Sahiti puraskaram (prakasam dist) 2010
- Acharya Diwakarla Venkata avadhani centenary Puraskar: 2011
- Sahitya Academi yuva Puraskar; 2011
- World Telugu Conference – Sahiti Puraskar: 2012
- Bangalore Literature Festival Telugu story award; 2013
- Ampasayya Naveen Navala puraskaram ; 2013
- Ravuri Bhardwaja sahiti puraskaram; 2014
- Dr Vasireddy sestha Devi katha puraskaram; 2014
- Dhrbhaka Subramanyam sahitya puraskaram; 2015
- Andhra Kesari yuva jana cheythanya puraskaram; 2015

== Seminars ==
- Kendra Sahithya Academi Seminar (Tirupathi) 2010
- Kendra Sahithya Academi Seminar (Dharwad) 2011
- Kendra Sahithya Academi Writers Travel Grant Prog. 27 April to 7 May 2011
- Rashtapati Bhavan -in residence programme; 8 to 26 September 2014
