= Duvvuri =

Duvvuri (Telugu: దువ్వూరి) is a Telugu surname. People using this surname generally hail from the village of Duvvur in Kadapa district of Andhra Pradesh or from East and West Godavari districts in Andhra Pradesh. It was said that Duvvuri surname finds its origins in three villages - Balantaram, Kuyyeru, Masakapalle of East Godavari district in coastal Andhra Pradesh. Prominent personalities with this surname include Duvvuri Subbarao ( IAS, Ex RBI Governor).

== Notable people ==
- Duvvuri Subbarao, retired IAS officer and former Governor of the Reserve Bank of India
- Duvvuri Ramireddy, famous Telugu poet writer
