= Mokkapati =

Mokkapati is a Telugu surname. People with the surname include:

- Mokkapati Narasimha Sastry (1892–1973), Telugu-language novelist
- Mokkapati Subbarayudu, Diwan of Maharajah of Pithapuram
- Mokkapati Manoj Kumar, From Naidupeta
- Mokkapati Ramesh Babu, Founder of Shreenijha Travels and Shreenija Hospitality Services
