= Buchi Babu =

Buchi Babu may refer to:

- Buchi Babu (film), a 1980 Indian film
- Butchi Babu (Sivaraju Venkata Subbarao; 1916-1967), Indian writer
- M. Buchi Babu Naidu, Indian cricketer
