= Rami Reddy =

Rami Reddy or Ramireddy (Telugu: రామిరెడ్డి) may refer to:

- Rami Reddy (actor) (1959–2011), Telugu film actor
- Duvvoori Ramireddy (1895–1947), Telugu writer
- Neelapu Rami Reddy (born 1965), Indian sprint athlete
- Vutukuru Rami Reddy (born 1918), Indian politician
