= Damalcheruvu =

Damalacheruvu
- Town
- Location in Andhra Pradesh, India Damalacheruvu (India)
- Coordinates: 13°29′N 79°03′E
- Country: India
- State: Andhra Pradesh
- District: Tirupati district
- Mandal: Pakala mandal

Population (December 2012)
  - Total: 15,000

Languages
  - Official: Telugu
- Time zone: UTC+5:30 (IST)
- PIN: 517152
- Telephone code: 918585
- Vehicle registration: AP03
- Nearest city: Tirupathi
- Sex ratio: 1:1 ♂/♀
- Climate: medium (Köppen)

Damalacheruvu is a town in Pakala mandal, Tirupati district of Andhra Pradesh in India. is located near Tirupati City.

== Geography ==
The town is surrounded by mountains in north and east boundaries and is well connected with roadways and railways. It is famous for its mangoes.

== History ==
The district was the location of a battle between the Maratha Empire and the Nawab of the Carnatic who was slain in battle.

== Notable people ==
It is the birthplace of Telugu short story writer, Madhurantakam Rajaram, who contributed to Telugu literature for more than four decades.

It is the birthplace of Mahasamudram Bhaskar IPS (kondepalli village) who was the D.G.P. of Andrapradesh (with Telangana) 2011.
