= Ampasayya Naveen =

Indian writer

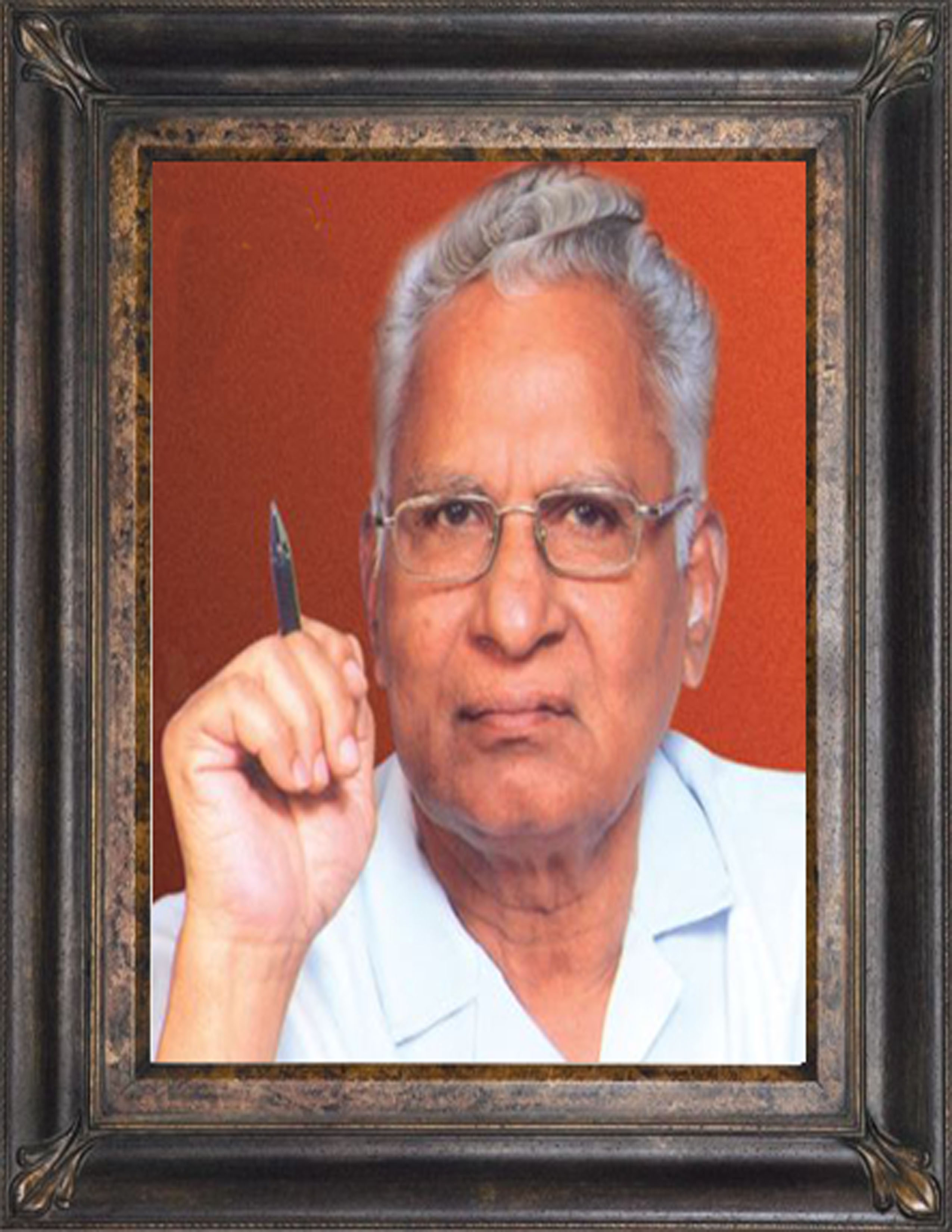
- Born: Dongari Mallaiah; 24 December 1941 (age 84); Vavilala(Village), Warangal, Telangana, India
- Education: M.A. Economics; Osmania University, Hyderabad
- Occupations: Novelist, short story writer
- Spouse: Anasuya
- Children: Swapna; Satish; Shashi Kiran
- Writing career
- Notable works: Ampasayya; Kala Rekhalu; Cheekati Rojulu

Dr. 'Ampasayya' Naveen (born 24 December 1941) is a Telugu novelist. He is an Osmania University alumni, and his college life at OU inspired his first novel, Ampasayya. His novel Kala Rekhalu won the Sahitya Academy Award in 2004. As a novelist, short story writer, literary critic, book reviewer, and columnist, Naveen is one of the most well-known contemporary Telugu literary figures.

== Biography ==
Born on 24 December 1941 as Dongari Mallaiah in a middle-class agricultural family at Vavilala, a village in Palakurthy mandal, Warangal district of Telangana. He has taken to pen name Naveen as began his literary journey fifty years ago. Naveen influenced the generations of Telugu readers over the last five decades with his 37 widely acclaimed novels, more than 120 short stories collected in five volumes and countless literary articles, essays on films, reviews, newspaper columns and middles. His most important contribution to the Telugu fiction is the introduction of the ‘stream of consciousness’ mode of narration which helps in probing and understanding the psyche of the characters. His novels Ampashayya (Bed of Arrows), Mullapodalu (Thorn Bushes) and Antasravanti (Inner Stream), which are popularly known as the ‘Ravi Trilogy,’ have brought the stream of consciousness technique to near perfection in Telugu fiction.

Many honours, awards and accolades came Naveen's way. His novel Antasravanti won for him the Telugu University's Best Novel Award for 1994. The Ministry of Human Resource Development, Government of India awarded him a senior fellowship during 1997-98 to write a trilogy of novels. Crowning upon all the awards came the Central Sahitya Akademi Award for his novel Kalarekhalu in 2004. Earlier in the same year Kakatiya University (Warangal, A.P.) honoured him with a Doctor of Letters (honoris causa) at its 16th Convocation. In 2000 Naveen had the honour of serving as a member of the jury appointed by the Government of Andhra Pradesh to decide the Nandi Awards for feature films. He had also served as a member of the Academic Senate of Kakatiya University for three years (2006–2009). His fame has travelled abroad as evidenced by the invitation in 2006 by the ATA (American Telugu Association). During his visit to the United States Naveen delivered lectures at various locations in Los Angeles, Atlanta, Columbia, Chicago and Detroit. He received Gopichand's National Literary Award in the year 2010 which was awarded to Mahaswetha Devi in the previous year i.e. 2009. Naveen was selected under writers and scholars in Residency Scheme started by Central Sahitya Akademy, New Delhi and was awarded fellowship during the year 2009.

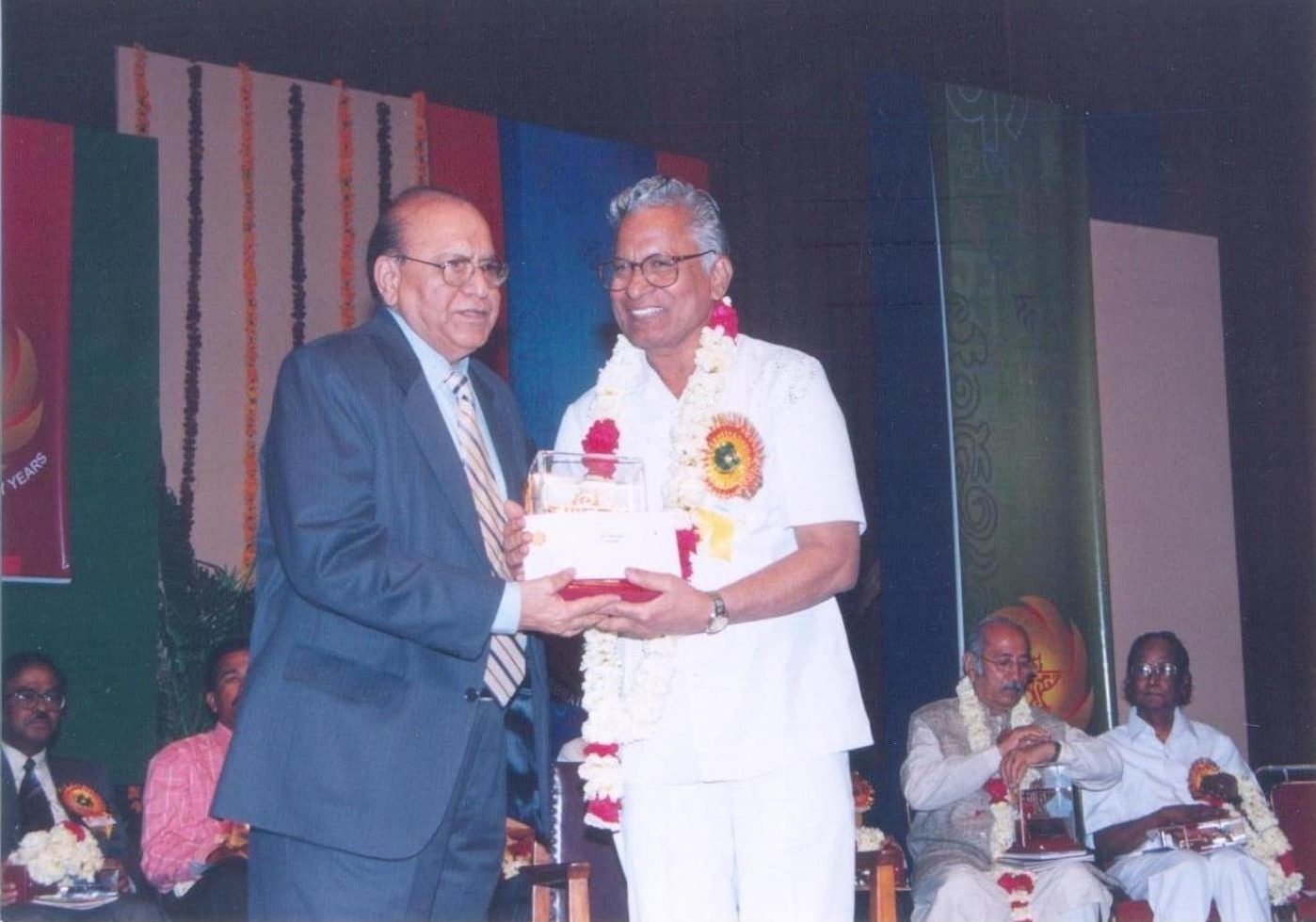
Dr.Naveen receiving Sahitya Academy Award from Prof.Gopi Chand Narang ( President - Sahitya Academy ) in New Delhi on 16-02-2005

Naveen's works have been widely read by both general audiences and critics. They are noted for a clear and engaging style and an interest in human behavior and social dynamics. His writings address contemporary social issues, including Cheekati Rojulu (Dark Days), which depicts the impact of the Emergency of 1975–77 on citizens; Women's College and Vichalitha (The Disturbed), which explore challenges faced by women in India; and Bondhavyalu (Relationships), which reflects changes in the socio-economic situation in Telangana between 1970 and 1995.

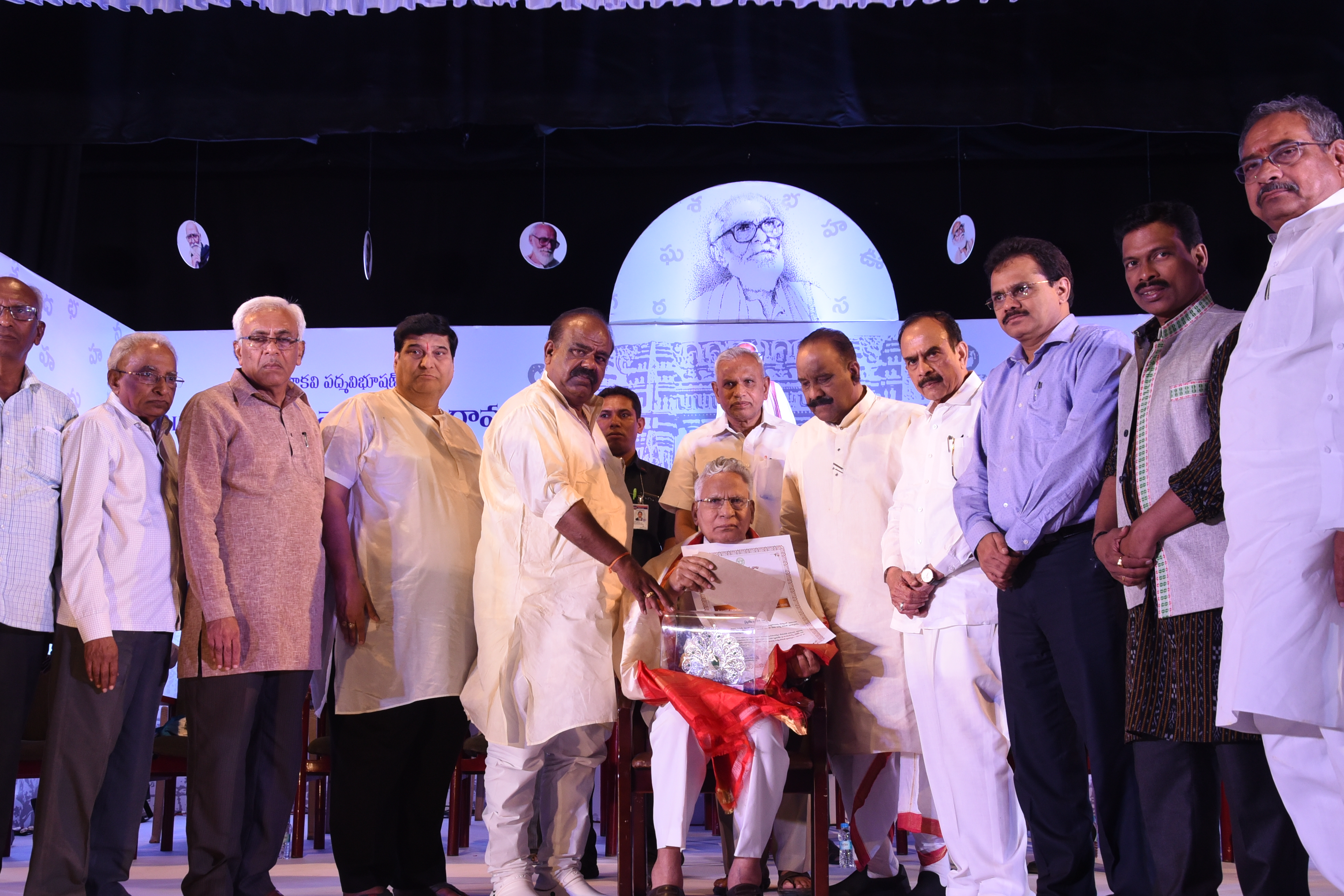
Ampasayya Naveen receiving the Award at Kaloji Narayanarao Sahithi Puraskaram (2018)

Naveen's short stories have appeared in five collections — Life in a college, Enimido Adugu (Eighth Step), From Anuradha with Love, Nishkriti (Deliverance) and Bandhitulu (The Enslaved). Apart from winning prizes many of his stories have also been translated into Hindi, English, Tamil, Kannada, Sanskrit and Marathi. A collection of his short stories has also appeared in English translation under the title Lifescapes.

Naveen had written a monograph for Sahitya Akademy, New Delhi on the life and works of R.S. Sudarshanam, the doyen of Telugu Literary Criticism. This book was published by Sahitya Akademy and has been translated into all Indian Languages and English.

Naveen has published a large number of critical articles, some of them in English, on Telugu fiction, films and other art forms. He wrote his second trilogy, known as the Telangana Trilogy– consisting of Kalarekhalu (Contours of time), Chedirina Swapnalu (Dreams Gone Sour), and Bandhavyalu – against the backdrop of the social history of Telangana from the early 1940s to the early 1990s. This is, by common consensus, the most authentic fictional account of the life and history of Telangana, a part in the state of Andhra Pradesh.

His works have been translated into Hindi, English and Kannada. Naveen was on the air on innumerable occasions giving speeches from AIR Hyderabad and Warangal stations on literary subjects. As part of the AIR Warangal station programme "Navala Vahini" he read his novel Women's College every week for 25 weeks. His magnum opus Kalarekhalu was broadcast as a play from AIR Hyderabad and Warangal stations as a daily serial for 13 days. Naveen also participated in a number of programmes broadcast by DD and other TV channels.

Naveen reviewed nearly one hundred books (Telugu and English), mainly novels and short story collections, for various magazines such as Andhra Jyothi, Andhra Prabha, Prajasahithi, Abyudaya, Eenadu, AP Times and Andhra Bhoomi.

Naveen also served the society at large and Telugu readers in particular by being on many voluntary organisations and cultural associations apart from being the founder president of Karimnagar Film Society. Naveen as a passionate reader of Telugu literature deeply studies the works of Telugu literary giants such as Gurajada Apparao, Srirangam Srinivasa Rao (Sri Sri), Chalam, Kodavatiganti Kutumbha Rao, Bucchibabu and R S Sudharashanam. He also undertaken an in-depth study of Satyajit Ray's Apu Trilogy movies. Many of the Telugu literature research scholars have chosen Naveen works as their study subjects and obtained their PhD and MPhil degrees. Telugu literary critics have quoted and referred Naveen's works in their critical study of Telugu literature.

Naveen, a college lecturer by career worked in the Education Department of Government of Andhra Pradesh for 32 years. He retired as principal, Government Degree College for Women, Waranagal, in July 1996. Naveen actively involved in the ‘Film Society’ movement in Karimnagar and Warangal and contributed a lot to spread the awareness of good cinema among the people of these towns. Naveen married to Anasuya and blessed with daughter Swapna and two sons Sathish and Shashi Kiran. Naveen pursuing his writings from Hanamakonda, Warangal.

== Novels ==
=== Ravi Trilogy ===
Ampashayya, Mullapodalu and Antasravanthi have come to be known as the ‘Ravi Trilogy’ in the Telugu literary circles. These three novels depict three different phases in the life of Ravi. The narrative technique is ‘streams of consciousness ‘ in all the three novels.

01. Ampashayya depicts the life of Ravi as a university student. The emphasis is on the psycho-economic factors of the times. This novel portrays 16 hours in the life of Ravi who stays at a hostel. It has been translated into Hindi and English and gone to six editions in Telugu.

02. Mullapodalu is a sequel to Ampashayya. This novel depicts the problems of unemployment of the times and provides the reasons for youth being drawn to different movements like Naxalism, separate Telangana, etc.

03. Antasravanthi is the last one of the trilogy. In this novel the married life and career of the protagonist Ravi is depicted. It has won for Naveen the prestigious Telugu University Award for the best novel in 1995.

=== Telangana Tetra-logy ===
==== Bhandavyalu, Kalarekhalu, Chedirina-Swapnalu, Ye velugulakee ee prasthanam ====
04.Bandhavyalu depicts the changing social and family relationships in the Telangana region against the background of various movements like the separate Telangana agitation, Naxalite armed struggle, etc., during the past twenty five years.It has been made into a TV serial of 260 episodes and telecast by Doordarshan from January 2007.

05.Kalarekhalu is a sociology -autobiographical novel based on the Telangana struggle against the imperialist regime. The novel is unique in its picturization of the struggle of suppressed humanity. The author has successfully captured the sentiments of populace in the throes of liberating themselves. The novel adds magnificently to Indian fiction in Telugu.Kalarekhalu depicts the social, political and cultural history of Telangana (the northern region of Andhra Pradesh) from 1956 to 1994. This novel won the Central Sahitya Akademi Award for year 2004. In its citation, the Sahitya Akademi mentioned "

06. Chedirina Swapnalu, in sequence to the other two novels of the Telangana Tetra-logy, reflects the social and political history of the people of Telangana since 1947.

07. Ye velugulakee ee prasthanam

=== Other works ===
08.Agadhalu (Depths): This is the story of a girl who struggles to achieve her life's mission in the face of heavy odds.

09. Women's College: Women's College probes the lives of working women. These women, in spite of earning their own livelihood, suffer many hardships and humiliations at the hands of society. They have two bosses — the employer at office and the husband at home. They realise that the only way to make to make it out is to rebel and assert their rights and be the own boss of themselves

10. Premonmadulu (Love Maniacs): This novel has been serialized in Nadi (monthly). It deals with the violence routinely perpetrated on women by maniacs in the name of love.

11. Avasthavikudu (The Unrealistic): This short novel was published in Chethura (Monthly). It deals with an idealist who tries to reform an institution drastically but fails.

12. Vichalitha (The Disturbed): Vichalitha depicts extra marital relations in a middle-class family. If a man commits adultery, society excuses him. If the same is committed by a woman, she is severely punished. The novel questions these double standards.

13. Sankellu (Chains): Sankellu tells the story of an idealist who values freedom but feels that he is in chains. He struggles to liberate himself from bondages like marriage, tradition, etc. Sankellu was made into a TV serial and was telecast by Gemini TV for thirteen weeks in 1999.

14. Karuna (heroine's name) : Karuna is the daughter of a police officer who brings her up with strict discipline. Because of this unkind up-bringing, Karuna becomes a meek and timid girl. When she is faced with a big crisis in her life regarding her marriage, she cannot take a bold decision and therefore she ends her life.

15. Mouna Ragalu (Silent Tunes) : A number of young men and women come together during the celebration of a wedding Most of them are relatives, mostly cousins. During just a few days they develop deep attachments, but they go their separate ways after the wedding leaving only memories behind.

16. Taru Maru (Reversal) : This is the story of a childless couple. The husband thinks that his wife has a medical problem. He threatens her that he will go in for a second marriage. But a medical examination of both the wife and husband establishes that he himself is unfit to father children. With this revelation their relationship undergoes a drastic change. Now it is the wife who dominates the husband.

17. Anuraga Sravanthi (Stream of Love) : This novel depicts the deep love and attachment between a wife and husband.

18. Andame Vishadam (Beauty is Grief) : Andame Vishadam shows how sometimes good looks become a big curse even for a man.

19. Cheekati Moosina Ekanthamlo (Lonely in the Dark) : This novel suggests that it is better to seek divorce when a wife and husband realise that their marriage has irrevocably broken.

20. Manoranyam (The Woods of Mind) : A group of friends — three men and three women — meet in a forest to celebrate and welcome the New Year. After a lot of fun and hilarity they start quarrelling with each other under the influence of alcohol.

21. Sowjanya (heroine's name) : Sowjanya narrates the story of unrequited love between Sowjanya and Krishna Rao. Krishna Rao falls in love with Sowjanya but Sowjanya hates him.

22. Dagudumutalu (Hide and Seek) : Dagudumutalu depicts the platonic love between Chaitanya and Vikram who are colleagues in an office. They appear to quarrel all the time, but in the depths of their hearts they worship each other.

23. Chemmagillani Kallu (Eyes Bereft of Tears) : This novel depicts the stormy love affair between a young cricketer and a sales girl.

24. Cheekati Rojulu (Dark Days) : Cheekati Rojolu depicts the atrocities committed by the police on an innocent writer during the dark days of the Emergency. This novel is written in the form of a diary. This is the only Telugu novel which highlights state violence during the Emergency. It has been translated into English.

25. Pratyusha (The Dawn) : Pratyusha depicts the miserable life of teachers in a private, unaided school. They are paid very meagre salaries but treated by the management as bonded labourers.

26. Prayanamulo Pramadalu (Women in Trouble / Women Travelling) : This is a novel written in the form of a travelogue. Rajeshwar, a lecturer in a women's college leads an excursion party of fifty young girls to south India. The trials and tribulations of these girls during the ten days of going round the places in South India are depicted sensitively.

27. Drukkonalu (View Points) : Published in Andhra Bhoomi as daily serial in 1998. This novel is an experiment in a new narrative technique. An incident takes place (a woman is said to have been raped in a dental clinic kept by a quack) and the people involved in the incident — a reporter, a police officer, the victim, the quack, etc. — give different versions of the same incident. The truth, however, seems to elude the observer.

28. Raktha Kasaram (Pool of Blood) : Raktha Kasaram was serialized in Vijaya Viharam (monthly). This novel deals with the contemporary problem of Naxalism in Telangana. It depicts the sociology-economic reasons for the spread of this movement and how innocent lives are lost in the war between the police and the Naxalites. This novel created a big stir in literary circles when it was published in the form of a book in March 2006.

29. America America : America America is a travel-novel based on Naveen's experience and observation of the life of the Telugu people in America. This novel proceeded from his visit to the United States in 2006 at the invitation of ATA (American Telugu Association).

30. Avasthavikudu (The Unrealistic) : This short novel was published in Chetura (Monthly). It deals with an idealist who tries to reform an institution drastically but fails.

31. Illu Illaniyevu (Whose House?) : This is also a short novel published in Chithra (Monthly) which depicts a dispute between a sister and a brother about the possession of a house.

== Short stories & Essays... ==
1. Life in a College (Hyderabad; Vishalandhra Publishing House, 1998). 2nd edition. This collection includes 15 short stories.

2. Enimido Adugu (Warangal: Pratyusha Publications, 1999). This collection includes 21 short stories.

3. From Anuradha with Love (Warangal: Pratyusha Publications, 2005). This collection includes 23 short stories.

4. Nishkriti (Warangal: Pratyusha Publications, 2007). This collection includes 10 short stories.

5. Bandhitulu (Warangal: Pratyusha Publications, 2009). This collection includes 18 short stories.

6. Asmadeeyulu - Tasamadeeyulu (Warangal: Pratyusha Publications, 2011). This collection includes 10 short stories.

8. Sahithya Vyasalu : This is a collection 50 literary essays covering a wide range of topics.

9. Jeevan Shaili : This is a collection of columns and middles written by Naveen

10. Cinema Vikshanam : This is a collection of articles and reviews on world cinema, covering Apu trilogy of Satyajit Ray.

== Accolades... ==
1. Best Short Story Prize to “Hatya” (murder) by Andhra Jyothi (weekly), 1973.

2. Best Short Story Prize to “Bali” (Sacrifice) by Swathi (monthly), 1984.

3. Best Short Story Prize to “Dadi” (Attack) by Pallaki (weekly), 1985.

4. Best Short Story Prize to “Thera” (Curtain) by Andhra Prabha (weekly), 1986.

5. Best Short Story Prize to “Chera” (Bondage) by Andhra Jyothi (weekly), 1987.

6. Best Novel Prize to Dagudu Muthalu (Hide and Seek) by Swathi (monthly), 1978.

7. Best Novel Award for the year 1994 to Antasravanthi (Inner Stream) by Pottisriramulu Telugu University (formerly known as AP Sahitya Akademi Award).

8. Senior Fellowship for two years (Oct. 1997 to Sept. 1999) awarded by the Department of Culture, Ministry of HRD, Govt. of India, New Delhi, for writing a trilogy of novels depicting the fifty years of socio-economic and political history of Telangana from 1944 to 1995.

9. Vishala Sahitya Academy Award, Jagtial, in 1998 for lifetime achievement.

10. Jyesta Literary Award, Visakhapatnam, in 1999, for best translation into English of his short story “Bali” as “Sacrifice.”

11. Raavi Shastry Award, Hyderabad for the year 2000.

12. Member of the Jury, Nandi Awards Committee, Govt. of Andhra Pradesh, 2000.

13. Pulikanti Krishna Reddy Sahiti Sanskriti's Life Time Achievement Award, 2002, Thirupati.

14. Telugu University's Pratibha Puraskaram in the short story and novels section, 2004.

15. Honorary Doctorate by Kakatiya University, Warangal, 2004.

16. Shahitya Akademi, New Delhi, award for Kalarekhalu in 2004.

17. Sahitya Akademi's ‘Writer in Residence’ fellowship for six months, 2009.

18. Shantidoota Award by World Peace Society, Warangal, 2009.

19. Vishista Literary Award by Pothana Vignana Kendram, warangal,2010

20. Life Time Achievement Award from Abyudaya Foundation, Kakinada, 2011.

21. Life Time Achievement Award from Samskruthi, Guntur, 2012.

22. Best Short Story Writer Award by Avancha Soma Sunder Literary Trust(Pithapuram) in 2012.

23. Jashuva Award as Best Prose Writer By Jashuva Research Centre of Telugu academy, Hyderabad, 2013.

24. Best Prose Writer Award by Telugu Rakshana Vedika, Hyderabad in 2014.
