= Katyayani Vidmahe =

Indian writer and academic

Ketavarapu Katyayani (born 1955), best known by her pen name Katyayani Vidmahe, is an Indian writer and academic. Her work focuses on Telugu literature, particularly feminist and Marxist writing.

== Early life and academic career ==
The writer was born Ketavarapu Katyayani in 1955 in Mailavaram, a village in the Addanki area of India's Andhra Pradesh state. Her mother was Indira Devi and her father was Ramakoti Sastry, a professor and literary critic.

She pursued studies in Warangal and Hyderabad, graduating with a master's degree in Telugu from Kakatiya University in Warangal in 1977, and earning a gold medal for her work. After graduating, she began teaching at the university while writing her Ph.D. on the novel Chivaraku Migiledi, and she eventually became a full professor there. She retired from the university in the 2010s.

== Writing and activism ==
As of 2013, she had written 275 research papers on Telugu literature, as well as 28 books, under her pen name Katyayani Vidmahe. She had also edited an additional 25 books. Among her books are Mahila Sadhikarata - Savallu, Adhunika Telugu Sahityam - Streevada Bhumika, Gender Samanata Disagaa Samajam, Sahityam, Kanyasulkam - Samajika Sambandhalu, and Gender Spruha.

Vidmahe's writing includes work on women's issues, and she has been involved in both feminist and Marxist activism. She founded the Society for Women's Studies and Development and Prajasvamya Rachayatala Vedika, a writers association for women. She has also served as national general secretary of the Democratic Women Workers's Forum.

== Awards ==
In 2013, Vidmahe won the Sahitya Akademi Award for her contribution to Telugu literature with her 2010 essay collection Sahityaakasamlo Sagam, which discusses issues of gender identity and women's role in literature. However, in 2015 she returned the award alongside several fellow winners in protest of "the growing intolerance in the country," particularly the assassination of the Kannada scholar M. M. Kalburgi and the 2015 Dadri lynching.
