= Papineni Sivasankar =

Writer and literary critic (born 1953)

Dr. Papineni Sivasankar
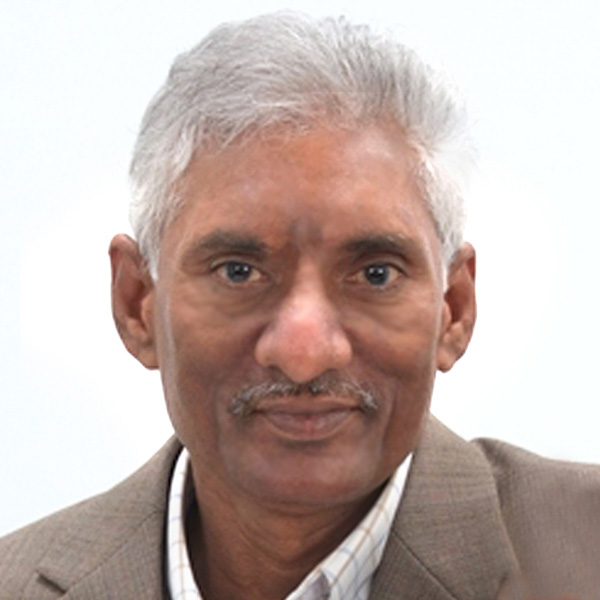
- Born: 6 November 1953 (age 72)
- Education: Andhra University
- Occupations: Poet, short story writer, literary critic
- Spouse: Gruha Lakshni
- Children: Srujana, Spandana
- Writing career
- Notable works: Rajani Gandha; Matti Gunde; Sahityam-Moulika Bhavanalu; Talli! Ninnu Dalanchi

Dr. Papineni Sivasankar (born 1953), a doyen of Modern Literature in Telugu, recipient of Sahitya Akademi Award, 2016 is an Indian poet, short story writer, and critic.

He has published 52 books, including seven poetry collections, three short story collections, ten essay collections, and edited 40 anthologies. His poetry collections and short story collections were translated into other languages such as English, Hindi, Panjabi, Tamil, Kannada, and Malayalam.

His notable works are Rajani Gandha (2013), Matti Gunde (Heart of the Soil), Sahityam-Moulika Bhavanalu (Literature-Basic Concepts), Talli! Ninnu Dalanchi and Veda Vyasam.

== Early life and career ==
Sivasankar was born on Vijaya Dipavali in 1953 in Nekkallu village, Guntur district, Andhra Pradesh, India, to Venkata Krishnarao, a farmer, and Santamma, a homemaker. He completed his schooling at K.V.R. Z.P.H. School, Tulluru. He studied at JKC College, Guntur, where he earned a B.A. degree and stood first in Andhra University, receiving the Prabhala Sundararamayya Pantulu Gold Medal in 1974. He obtained his M.A. in 1976 from Andhra University, Nallapadu branch, and was awarded the Telikicherla Venkataratnam Gold Medal. His Ph.D. thesis, Sahityam – Moulika Bhavanalu, was awarded the Tumati Donappa Gold Medal for the best thesis by Acharya Nagarjuna University in 1989.

He married Gruha Lakshmi in 1977, and the couple have two daughters, Srujana and Spandana. He joined B.S.S.B. College, Tadikonda, as a Telugu lecturer in 1977 and retired as principal of the college in 2010.

== Literary works ==
Beginning with Stabdhata-Chalanam (1984) Sivasankar published seven poetry collections among which the award-winning Rajani Gandha (2013) is significant. Dr. Papineni's greatness as a poet lies in his vibrant expression, fertile imagination, grandeur of thought and finest human sensibility. His first poem free verse Cheekati nundi Vekuvaku was published in Dipavali Special issue of Andhra Jyothi in 1981. His first short story Kalupu Mokka was published in the weekly Prajatantra in April 1977. The short story Mattigunde was acclaimed as one of the 100 best short stories of the 20th century. Samudram is noted as a unique narrative experiment in the second person, dealing with the decline of human intellectual succession.

Dr. Papineni published three short story collections. His short fiction reflects the struggles of farmers, the impact of globalization on rural life, and broader human anxieties. He also published five books of literary criticism, includingSahityam-Moulika Bhavanalu. As a critic, Sivasankar evaluated the merits of the classical poetry in Telugu. With his insights in sociological theories he evolved many a concept like Avicchinnata (Continuity), Nisargata (Spontaneity), Parayitanam (Alienation) to analyze modern Telugu literature.

In an extensive interview with Dr. C. Mrunalini Sivasankar revealed his exploration in Telugu literature and social culture as well.

== Awards and Accolades ==
- The Sahitya Akademi Award, 2016 for his poetry collection Rajani Gandha
- Free Verse Front Award, Hyderabad, 16 December 1985
- Dr. Garikapati Kavita Puraskaram, Rajahmundry, 09 May 1991
- Jyeshta Sahithi Award, Visakhapatnam, 26 June 1993
- Ummidisetty Award, Tadipatri, 1993
- Dr. C. Narayana Reddy Award, Karimnagar, 26 August 1999
- Telugu University Vachana Kavitha Puraskaram (1999), Hyderabad, 30 December 2000
- Nutalapati Literary Award, Tirupathi, 15 November 2000
- Nagabhairava Kalapeetham Award, Ongole, 25 January 2002
- Andhra Pradesh Adhikara Bhasha Puraskaram, Tirupati, 28 May 2003
- Andhra Pradesh State Best Teacher Award, 05 September 2003
- Akashvani National First Prize (2004) for 'Chivari Picchika', Trivendram, 05 September 2005
- Viswakalapeetham Snehanidhi Puraskaram, Hyderabad, 01 January 2006
- Visalandhra-Sunkara Sahithi Satkaram, Ongole, 15 September 2006
- Dr. Kethu Viswanatha Reddy Katha Puraskaram, Nandaluru, 13 July 2008
- Dr. Avamtsa Soma Sundar Kavitha Puraskaram, Pithapuram, 18 November 2010
- Andhra Nataka Kala Samithi Award, Bezawada, 18 April 2012
- Navyandhra Rashtra Ugadi Visishta Puraskaram, Anantavaram, 2015
- Srujana Sahithi Puraskaram, Addanki, 16 August 2015
- Devarakonda Balagangadhara Tilak Puraskaram, Tanuku, 29 August 2015
- Bollimuntha Sahithi Satkaram, Tenali, 2017
- Bharathi Samithi Puraskaram, Gudivada, 12 February 2017
- G.S.V. Sahitee Puraskaram, Tanuku, 2017
- Best National Poet honor by Prasara Bharati, Varanasi, 12 January 2017
- Viswadaata Kasinathuni NageswaraRao Pantulu Award, Elakurru, 08 May 2017
- Pucchalapalli Sundarayya Kala Puraskaram, Yadlapadu, 19 May 2017
- Mahakavi Jashua Award, Guntur, 2017
- Mahakavi Tummala Kalapeetham Puraskaram, Guntur, 16 December 2019
- Addepalli RamaMohanaRao Vimarsa Puraskaram, Kakinada, 11 December 2021
- HanumaReddy Sahitee Puraskaram, Ongolu, 24 April 2022
- Jashua Sahitee Puraskaram, Guntur, 27 September 2022
- Kaviraju Tripuraneni Ramaswamy Puraskaram, Guntur, 09 January 2023
- Ravi Sastry Puraskaram, Visakhapatnam, 30 July 2024
- Katha Deepa Dhaari Puraskaram, Hyderabad, 15 March 2026

== Bibliography ==
- Stabdhata-Chalanam (Free Verse) (1984)
- Oka Saaramsam Kosam (Free Verse) (1990)
- Mattigunde (Short Stories) (1992)
- Sahityam-Moulika Bhavanalu (Research Thesis) (1996)
- Aku Pacchani Lokamlo (Free Verse) (1998)
- Oka Khadgam Oka Pushpam (Free Verse) (2004)
- Sagam Terichina Talupu (Short Stories) (2008)
- Nisanta (Critical Essays) (2008)
- Talli! Ninnu Dalanchi (Commentary on Classical Poetry) (2012)
- Rajani Gandha (Free verse) (2013)
- Dravadhuikata (Social Critique) (2015)
- Maha Swapnikudu (Essays on Sri Sri) (2016)
- Veda Vyasam (Critique on Maharshi Veda Vyasa) (2019)
- Ankura (Padya Kavita) (2019)
- Nisarga (Critical Essays) (2019)
- Adarsa Moortulu (Children Stories) (2019)
- Maa Gokhale (Monograph) (2021)
- Sarala Rekhalu (Short Stories) 2022
- Loyaloo Sikharaaloo (Free Verse) 2022
- Tikkana (Monograph) 2025
