= Butchi Babu =

Indian writer

- Born: Sivaraju Venkata Subbarao; 14 June 1916; Eluru, Madras Presidency, British India
- Died: 1967 (aged 51)
- Occupations: Short story writer, novelist and painter
- Spouse: Subbalakshmi (m. 1937)
- Writing career
- Language: Telugu
- Notable work: Chivaraku Migiledi

Sivaraju Venkata Subbarao (14 June 1916 – 1967), known by his pen name Butchi Babu, was an Indian short story writer, novelist and painter known for his works in Telugu literature.

== Early life ==
Butchi Babu was born on 14 June 1916 at Eluru, Andhra Pradesh. He initially served as an English lecturer in Anantapur and Vizag. He also served in the All India Radio (AIR) from 1945 until his death in 1967. He did his master's degree (M.A.) in English literature.

He married Subbalakshmi in 1937.

== Chivaraku Migiledi ==
The novel Chivaraku Migiledi is Butchi Babu's best known work. The protagonist's quest involves him in a conflict with society and results in an agonizing reappraisal of life's values and finally leads him to self-knowledge, acceptance and peace.

Chivaraku Migiledi was serialized in the Telugu magazine Navodaya between 1946 and 1947. It was published in book form in 1952. Chivaraku Migiledi, published by Adarsha Grandha Mandali in 1957, became a best seller. The book is now published by Visalaandhra Publishing House, Hyderabad.

Katyayani Vidmahe did extensive research on the novel in Chivaraku Migiledi - Manasika Samajika Jeevana Sravanti Navala Vimarsa (Kakateeya University, Warangal, India) and was awarded a doctorate (PhD) for it. The novel has been translated into English by Kakani Chakrapani in Four Classics of Telugu Fiction (Dravidian University, Kuppam, India).

== Other works ==
=== Stories ===
Butchi Babu was a prolific short story writer. Two of his well-known short stories are "Nannu Gurinchi Kadha Vrayavoo?" ("Won't you write a story about me?") and "Ame Needa" ("Her shadow"). Some of the other stories include "Maratunana marapu raru", "Tadi mantaku podineellu", "Kaviraja virajitam", "Desam Nakichina Sandesam", "Nosantan Vrasina vrata", "Intayina into aidu", "Vudina chakram-vaadani pushpam", and "Naa gajumeda".

70 of his stories were published as seven volumes with the following titles:

- Meda metlu
- Nannu Gurinchi Kadhavrayavu
- Kalalo jarina kanneru
- Nirantara Trayam
- Teerpu Cheshina vadike Siksha
- Tadi mantaku podi neeluu
- Jnana netram

=== Essays ===
Butchi Babu wrote essays in Telugu like "Nannu Marchina Pustakam" ("The Book That Changed Me") and "Neenu Shankarnarayan Nighantuvu" ("Me and Shankar Nararayan Dictionary"). A collection of his essays has been published by Visalaandhra Publishing House, Hyderabad.

=== Radio plays and stage dramas ===
Butchi Babu wrote several radio plays and stage dramas. Noted film personalities like Savitri and Pundarikakshayya acted in his stage dramas like Atma Vanchana.

=== Paintings ===
Butchi Babu was a prolific painter. Most of his paintings are landscapes. The paintings were inspired by what was around him and depict the country side of Southern India in 1940–1960. The painting shows All India Radio Office in Vijayawada in 1955.

== Awards ==
Butchi Babu's Shakespeare Sahiti Paramarsa (A Critique on Shakespeare's literature) won him the prestigious Sahitya Akademi Award (awarded posthumously).

In a competition arranged by Andhra Kala Parishath, Kakinada, Butchi Babu received the best drama award from Prithviraj Kapoor for his drama Atma Vanchana.

== Death ==
Butchi Babu died in 1967, aged 51.
