= Pancha Kavyas =

The following are the Telugu Pancha Kaavyas, the five great books of Telugu literature.

- Amuktamaalyada - Krishnadevaraya, 16th-century king-poet and patron of Telugu literature.
- Manu Charitra or Swaarochisha Manu Sambhavam - Allasani Peddana, a poet in the court of Krishnadevaraya.
- Panduranga Maahaatmyam - Tenali Ramakrishna, a poet in the court of Krishnadevaraya.
- Vasu Charitra - Ramarajabhushanudu, a poet in the court of late 16th-century king Tirumala Deva Raya, son-in-law of Krishnadevaraya.
- Vijaya Vilaasamu - Chemakura Venkata Kavi, a poet in the court of the early 17th-century Raghunatha Nayak.
