= Dasarathi Satakam =

Form of Telugu poetry

Dasarathi Satakam (Telugu: దాశరథీ శతకము) is a Telugu Bhakti Satakam, a popular form of Telugu poetry. It was written by Kancharla Gopanna during 17th century. It consists of 104 poems. Dasarathi means son of Dasaratha, who is the incarnation of Vishnu, Rama. The makutam for all the poems end with dASarathee karuNApayOnidhee! (O son of Dasaratha, the ocean of mercy). Kancherla Gopanna was a devotee of Lord Rama so he sang many songs about him with makutam dasarathi karunaapayonidhi'.

== Full text ==
s:te:దాశరథీ శతకము Full text of Dasarathi Satakam in Telugu Wikisource.
