= Kanety Krishna Menon =

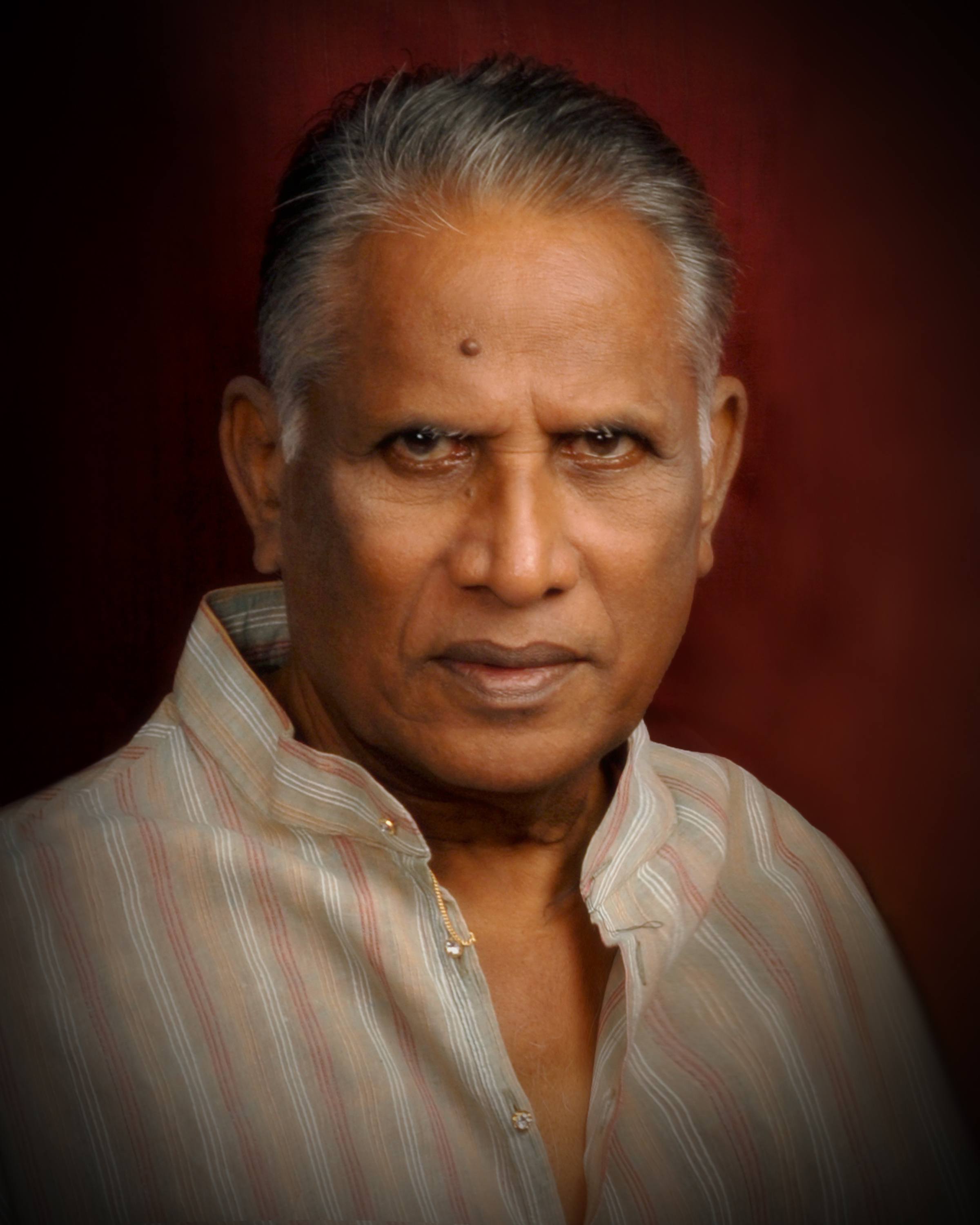
- K. K. Menon
- Born: 1942; Ramaraju Lanka, East Godavari
- Died: 1 August 2012 (aged 69–70)
- Occupation: Telugu Writer

Kanety Krishna Menon (1942 - 2012) was a Telugu writer with about 80 short stories and 6 novels to his credit. Many of his stories have been translated to different languages in India.

== Career ==
K. K. Menon was employed with Accountant General's office in Hyderabad. He was born and brought up in Ramaraju Lanka, a remote village in East Godaveri district. He had his secondary education at Rajolu, graduation at Bhimavaram and attained a master's degree in Economics from Nagpur University.

He started writing short stories when he was studying IX class. His teacher late Kandukuri Ramabhadra Rao, who was himself a well known writer encouraged him to write. His first story got him an award which inspired him to take up writing seriously.

Menon's writings and ideologies were inspired by prominent writers like Sri Sri, Atreya, Gudipati Venkatachalam and Kalipatnam Ramarao.

== Works ==
Menon's first short story was published in "Prajamatha" a Bangalore-based magazine while he was studying his 12th Standard.

Since 1974 his short stories continues to publish in different Telugu daily and weekly magazines.

In 1977 his first novel Baki Batukulu was publishes by Vishal andhra publications .This novel was again published in 1994 by the same publisher.

In 1979 Idi Streaking Kadu a compilation of Short stories was published. In 1996 Puli Kuudu was published.

About eight of his stories were translated to Hindi by Dr. Bhimsen Nirmal. One of his short story Dwaram was translated to Punjabi.

He co-authored Rangula Needa with Yandamuri Veerendranath.

Menon's writings generally reflect images of contemporary socioeconomic scenario. The characters were always made with a sympathetic approach to poorer classes of the society.

Inspired by Matter of Life authored by Sir Robert Edwards and Dr Patrick Steptoe(the father of Test-Tube babies), Menon penned a novel Krathuvu. Krathuvu won him an acclaim and established him as a versatile author.

His novel Krathuvu has been selected by many Telugu research scholars as a subject for Ph.D in science fiction category in Telugu literature.

Once the eminent writer Sri Madhurantakam Rajaram quoted that he had never seen a novel that received as much response as Krathuvu in past 25 years.

In 2014 the novel has been translated to Hindi by Mr.G.Parmeshwar.

== Awards ==
In 1993, [Etukuri Venkata Narasiah Memorial award] was presented to Menon by Telugu University in recognition of his contribution to Telugu literature.

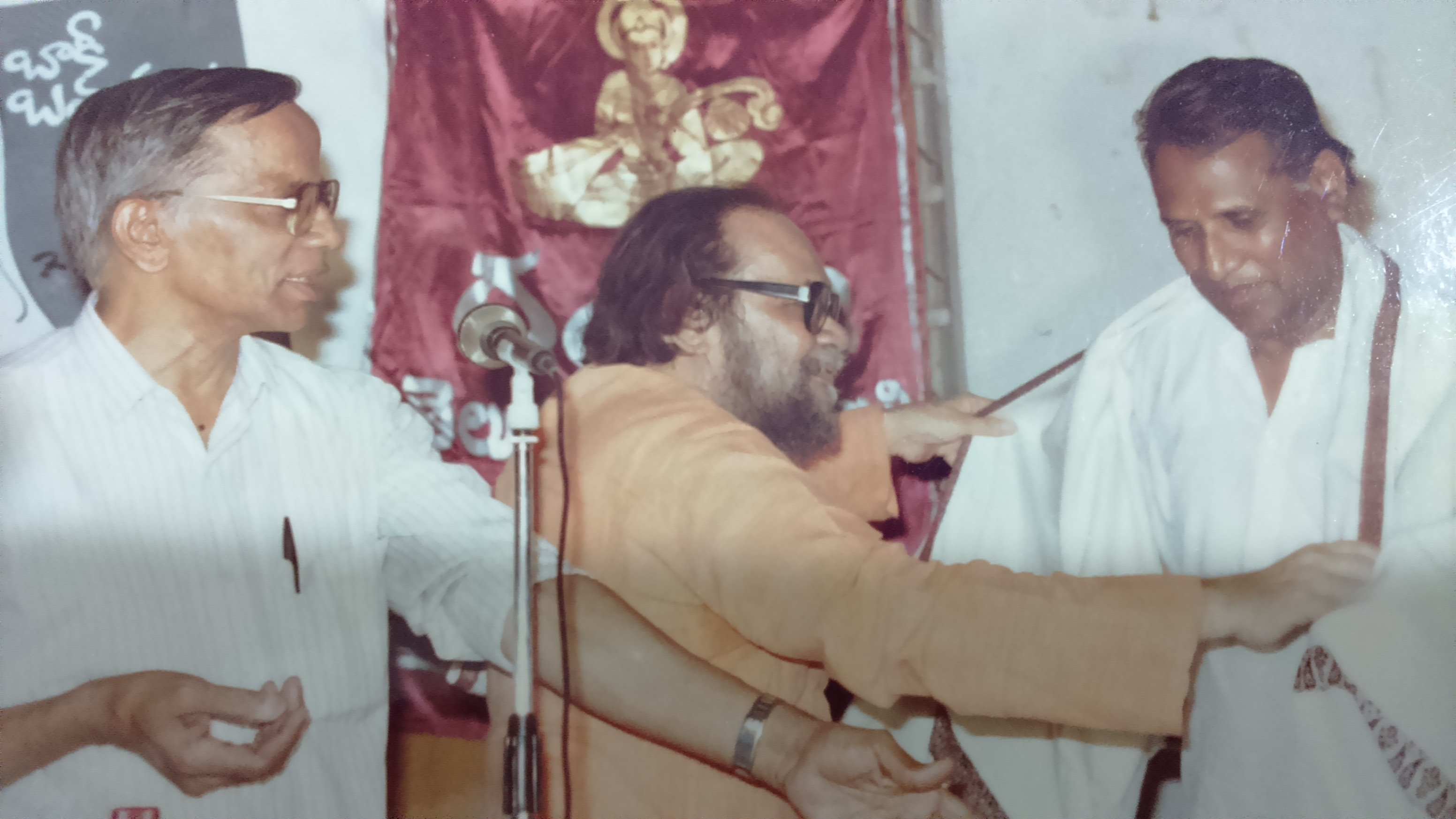
Aarudra felicitating Mr. Menon

== Personal life ==
Kanety Krishna Menon was born in Dindi a remote village of Rajolu to Smt. Venkamma and Kanety Tataiah. He was the eldest son of a family of four siblings. In his young age he was adopted by his maternal aunt Smt. Satamma and Sri James who lived in Ramaraju Lanka. Most of his childhood was spent in Ramaraju Lanka.

He had two sisters (Mahaniamma and Smt. Bharati) and two brothers (Madhusudan and Lakshmi Vara Prasad).

He married Siroratnamma on 19 June 1963 and moved to Hyderabad in 1965 to join his service with Accountant Generals's Office.

He has two children. His daughter Dr. Aparna is an ophthalmologist and his son Vamshi Kanety lives in Bahrain.

Menon was an active member of Ranjani a literary association and was associated with it until his retirement in 1997. He was an active participant for many literary activities and supporter of Virasam, a revolutionary writers association. In the year 2005 he was diagnosed with Parkinson's disease which forced him to refrain from writing. On 1 August 2012 he died after being bedridden for 2 years.
