= Hank Heifetz =

American poet

- Born: Henry S. Heifetz; May 20, 1935 (age 91); Boston, Massachusetts, U.S.
- Education: Harvard University (BA); University of California, Berkeley (PhD)
- Occupations: Poet; novelist; documentarian; critic; translator
- Spouse: Natasha Alpert (m. 1957)
- Children: 2
- Parent(s): Edward Heifetz; Dina Heller

Henry S. (Hank) Heifetz (born May 20, 1935) is an American poet, novelist, documentarian, critic, and translator. He has published poems in various collections and journals, one novel, critical writings on film and other topics, numerous translations of Spanish to English, and translations of ancient Sanskrit and Tamil poetry into American English verse. His translation of Kalidasa's "Kumarasambhavam," entitled "The Origin of the Young God", was selected as one of the twenty-five best books of the year by the Village Voice in 1990. Heifetz has lived and traveled extensively in India, Latin America, Europe, and Turkey, and he has translated works in several languages, including Spanish, Tamil, and Sanskrit. He has taught writing, translation, film, literature, and Indian studies at universities including Yale University, Mount Holyoke College, Wesleyan University, City University of New York (CUNY), San Jose State University, and the University of Wisconsin-Madison. He has recently completed a new novel and a collection of his own poetry for publication as well as working on a poetic translation of a Sanskrit epic poem.

== Early life ==
Henry Saul (Hank) Heifetz was born May 20, 1935, in the Dorchester-Mattapan area of Boston, Massachusetts, a working-class Jewish neighborhood. Henry and his older brother, Leonard, were the children of Lithuanian immigrants, Edward, a vegetable-truck driver and Dina (Heller), a homemaker. Heifetz graduated from Boston Latin School and was the first member of his immediate family to go to college, attending Harvard University with a full scholarship. In 1957 he married Natasha Alpert, with whom he had two children, a son, Aaron, and a daughter, Samara. He graduated from Harvard in 1959 (class of 1957) with a Bachelor of Arts degree, Summa cum Laude, in English and American Literature. After graduation, Heifetz was awarded a Fulbright Fellowship and traveled to Europe where he studied and taught for three years before returning to the United States and settling in New York City in 1962. In New York he began his first novel, "Where Are the Stars in New York?", which he completed after moving to California in 1968. He attended the University of California, Berkeley, where he completed a master's degree in South and Southeast Asian studies in 1979. In 1983 Heifetz received a PhD with distinction in South Asian studies, with an emphasis on Sanskrit and Tamil, from the University of California, Berkeley. After completing his doctoral degree, Heifetz taught in the Department of South Asian Studies at the University of Wisconsin-Madison. It was there that he met Mira (Reym) Binford, a filmmaker and academic, who became and remains his life partner. They now divide their time between New York City and Hamden, Connecticut.

== Writing ==
=== Translations ===
Heifetz has published many literary translations of articles, poems, and books. Among his numerous translations of poetry from Sanskrit and Tamil to English, his version of Kalidasa's "Kumarasambhavam," "The Origin of the Young God", is considered an unparalleled accomplishment. Geoffrey O'Brien wrote in the Village Voice, "The most exciting book of new poetry I've read in the last several years is a translation of a 1600-year-old Sanskrit epic. Hank Heifetz has had the audacity to take on a formally elaborate, densely allusive masterpiece in which rhythm, assonance, and wordplay are crucial--and the gift to make American poetry out of it." The poem, probably composed about AD 400, is considered the greatest long poem in classical Sanskrit. It is the love story of Shiva and Parvati, the god and the goddess, who are viewed as lovers and as cosmic principles. In an article in the Journal of South Asian Literature, John E. Cort noted that a new approach to translating Sanskrit poetry into English is "best exemplified in Hank Heifetz's excellent translation of Kalidasa's Kumarasambhavam, 'The Origin of the Young God', a translation which marks a new departure for translations of Sanskrit into English, and should remain a model for all translators for decades." Poet Robert Creeley wrote of "The Origin of the Young God", "This remarkable translation...holds its active authority as poetry throughout...an exceptional literary accomplishment."

Heifetz's translations of classical Tamil poetry, in collaboration with the distinguished scholar of Tamil, George L. Hart, include major works previously untranslated as poetry to poetry. "The Four Hundred Songs of War and Wisdom", for instance, had been previously translated into English prose, but with the participation of Heifetz, the new translation retained the work's poetic form and beauty. In 2002, Heifetz and Hart were awarded the A. K. Ramanujan Book Prize, in recognition of the quality of their translation. George Hart's "Poets of the Tamil Anthologies: Ancient Poems of Love and War", for which Heifetz was a poetic advisor, was a finalist for the National Book Award in Translation in 1980. On the translation by Heifetz and Hart of "The Forest Book of the Ramayana of Kampan", noted scholar of Tamil, Kamil Zvelebil wrote: "A translation that conveys the sense of the Tamil original as one of the great masterpieces of world literature fills us with admiration and gratitude...(a) penetrating knowledge of the original text coupled with genuine poetic inspiration."

Heifetz has also worked on poetically revising translations from the Telugu language done by Professor Velcheru Narayana Rao, including from the Kalahastisvara Satakamu.

In addition to the translations of Indian poetry, Heifetz has translated many articles and books from Spanish to English. Working with the Mexican intellectual, Enrique Krauze, Heifetz translated a series of articles by Krauze for The New York Times, The New York Review of Books, and others. (See External links)

Heifetz also acted as translator, editor and reviser of two books by Krauze, "Mexico: Biography of Power", and "Redeemers: Ideas and Power in Latin America". "Mexico: Biography of Power" was recently included in a list of the best non-fiction books of all time selected by New York Times staff writers.

=== Poetry and novels ===
In addition to his translations of poetry, Heifetz has written and published a number of his own poems. His poetry has appeared in such publications as Evergreen Review, the Village Voice and Masks. A collection of his poems, entitled "Lightyears", was published in 2019 by the publishing house Editorial Clio in Mexico City.

His novel, "Where Are the Stars in New York?", was described by novelist Sol Yurick as, "a stunning evocation of an American rebellion... A surreal-real drama... first-rate art and politics." After years of writing in other forms, Heifetz has completed another novel, "Business as Usual Under the Stars," and he has begun writing a new work of fiction.

=== Criticism and essays ===
Heifetz has also written numerous articles and reviews of books and films for Cineaste (magazine), the Village Voice, The Journal of Asian Studies, Letras Libres, and other publications.

== Films ==
Heifetz has always had an interest in films. In the early 1960s, together with his colleague Norman Fruchter, Heifetz broadcast a weekly one-hour radio program of film criticism on WBAI-FM in New York. He was a juror for the American Film Festival in the 1980s, and for the Annual CableACE Awards in the 1990s. He has been writer and translator for several documentaries, and he has written many film reviews and articles. (See External Links)

He was co-writer of the prize-winning documentary, "Diamonds in the Snow", completed in 1994. "Diamonds in the Snow" portrays Holocaust history through the microcosm of a town in Poland, where a few Jewish girls were rescued from the Nazis by Christians who risked their own lives to save the children of strangers. This moving film was broadcast on PBS in 1995; it has been shown at numerous film festivals and has aired internationally in English, German, and Spanish versions.

From 1996 to 2001, Heifetz worked in Mexico City as Creative Director of the television series "Mexico: Siglo XX" (Mexico: 20th Century), which began airing on Televisa in April 1998. It was renamed "Mexico: Nuevo Siglo" (Mexico: New Century) at the beginning of 2001. In conjunction with Executive Producer Enrique Krauze and teams selected for each program, Heifetz directed the production of more than 120 television programs. The series has aired weekly throughout the Mexican Republic on Televisa, and programs have also been broadcast on PBS in the United States. The New York Times described "Mexico: Siglo XX" as, "...an uncensored panorama of their country in the 20th Century unlike anything ever displayed on Mexican television."

== Selected bibliography ==
Hart, George L., and Hank Heifetz, translators. "The Forest Book of the Ramayana of Kampan." University of California Press, 1988.

Heifetz, Hank. “The Anti-Social Act of Writing.” Studies on the Left, 1963.

Heifetz, Hank. “Breaklight, the Poetry of the Caribbean, Edited by Andrew Salkey.” Village Voice, 10 Aug. 1972.

Heifetz, Hank. “Brothers of the Man Who Killed Gandhi.” Village Voice, 22 Aug. 1974.

Heifetz, Hank. “The Dhvanyaloka and Locana, Translated by D.H.H. Ingalls, Jeffrey Masson and M.V. Patwardhan.” The Journal of Asian Studies, Feb. 1992.

Heifetz, Hank. “Divided Soul, The Life of Gogol, by Henry Troyat.” Village Voice, 2 May 1974.

Heifetz, Hank. “Europa, Europa, a Film by Agnieszka Holland.” Cineaste, XVIII, no. 4, 1991.

Heifetz, Hank. "Lightyears, Collection of Poems by Hank Heifetz." Editorial Clio, Mexico City, Mar. 2019

Heifetz, Hank. “Movie Madness.” Village Voice, 17 Sept. 1991.

Heifetz, Hank. “The Naked Ascetic.” Village Voice, 17 May 1974.

Heifetz, Hank. “The Only Dance There Is, by Ram Dass.” Village Voice, 13 June 1974.

Heifetz, Hank. “Peter Brook's The Mahabharata.” Cineaste, 1991.

Heifetz, Hank. “The Philosophy of the Grammarians, by Harold Coward and K. Kunjunni Raja.” The Journal of Asian Studies, Feb. 1992.

Heifetz, Hank. “Sabbatai Zevi, by Gerschom Scholem.” Village Voice, July 1974.

Heifetz, Hank. “Sanskrit Dramas, by S. Subramonia Iyer.” Journal of South Asian Literature, 20 Jan. 1985.

Heifetz, Hank. “Shiva's Warriors, Translated by Velcheru Narayana Rao and Gene Roghair.” The Journal of Asian Studies, Feb. 1992.

Heifetz, Hank. “Songs of Experience, the Poetics of Tamil Devotion, by Norman Cutler.” The Journal of Asian Studies, Aug. 1992.

Heifetz, Hank. “The Tamil Veda, by John Carman and Vasudha Narayanan.” The Journal of Asian Studies, Aug. 1991.

Heifetz, Hank, Co-translator. For the Lord of the Animals. University of California Press, Berkeley, 1987.

Heifetz, Hank, translator. “Sanskrit Love Poems.” Translation, 1980.

Heifetz, Hank. “Under the Spirit.” Village Voice, 13 Sept. 1973.

== See also ==
- List of translators into English
