= Chivaraku Migiledi (novel) =

1952 Telugu novel by Sivaraju Venkata Subbarao

- Author: Sivaraju Venkata Subbarao
- Translator: Kakani Chakrapani
- Language: Telugu
- Genre: Psychological novel
- Set in: Different parts of Andhra Pradesh
- Publication date: 1952
- Publication place: India
- OCLC: 30334093

Chivaraku Migiledi (English: All That Remains) is a 1952 Telugu-language psychological novel by Indian writer Sivaraju Venkata Subbarao, who is generally known by his pen-name Butchi Babu. The novel, which is considered to be a magnum opus of Butchi Babu, tells the story of Dayanidhi, a doctor with a mother fixation, and the difficulties he experiences after her death.

== Background ==
Chivaraku Migiledi was serialized in Navodaya during 1946–1947, and was published as a book in 1952. An abridged version was published in 1957 by the Southern Language Book Trust and became a best seller. It tells the story of Dayanidhi, a doctor with a mother fixation, and the difficulties he experiences after his mother's death. Dayanidhi's search for a lover and life-partner is entangled in larger conflicts with his social world until he reassess his life, rekindles a relationship with a woman he once tried to date, and establishes an independent life with her.

== Characters ==
The principle characters of the novel are:

- Dayanidhi – a medical student and later medical practitioner
- Dasaratha Ramayya – Dayanidhi's father
- Komali, Amritam and Indira
- Susila – a cousin of Dayanidhi
- Anantacharlu – a political worker who befriends Dayanidhi

== Plot ==
The novel is set in Andhra Pradesh's West Godavari district between 1933 and 1940. The protagonist Dayanindhi takes time off from his medical studies to visit his native village, where he finds his mother and elder brother, who has just married and lives there with his wife, are always squabbling. The story begins with his faithful old servant telling Dayanindhi the couple have deserted their home after one final quarrel.

Although Dayanidhi identifies deeply with his mother, he does not rush home but goes to find Komali, a woman who fascinates him and whom his mother wants him to marry. After being rebuffed, Dayanidhi spends time at a circus and, when he decides to go back home late at night, encounters his father, who tells Dayanidhi his mother has been promiscuous. When Dayanidhi and his father return to the family home, they discover Dayanidhi's mother is dead. The incident becomes a pivotal moment in Dayanidhi's life.

Dayanidhi continues his college studies. On another visit to his former home, he meets his cousins Susila and Amritam. Though the family would like him to marry Susila, he is discouraged by her hostile attitude to his deceased mother and snide references to Komali. Amritam, who is married, makes a good impression on Dayanidhi, who likes her affectionate nature and her lack of hostility towards Komali. On a picnic, Komali asks Dayanidhi for 50 rupees, ostensibly for her mother, and asks him to visit her house that night. Dayanidhi borrows the sum from Amritam. When he finds Komali asleep, he avoids the temptation of touching her and slips the money under her pillow. Komali promptly leaves with a wealthy man. It emerges that Komali's mother wants to live off her daughter's earnings.

Eventually, Dayanidhi's father arranges for him to marry Indira, whose father is a policeman. Amritam provides Dayanidhi with a wedding ring. Just prior to the consummation of their marriage, Dayanidhi chances upon an anti-British public meeting and gets up to harangue people on the virtues of freedom but is injured when the police charge in and requires hospitalization. Only Amritam visits him as he recovers; his prospective father-in-law will have nothing to do with someone who preaches against the British authorities.

Having recovered, Dayanidhi sets up a medical practice in the coastal town of Eluru but stories about his mother and his own broken marriage persist in causing him problems, especially after he begins treating a friend's mentally ill sister. Dayanidhi moves to Rayalaseema, where he volunteers to assist victims of the plague that is ravaging the area. When Amritam visits him, they have sex as a tempest sweeps through the town and his sexual inhibitions are suddenly mastered. While following a local political leader Anantacharlu during a stay in Vajrakarur, Dayanidhi digs up a large diamond, which he sells and uses the money to found a hospital and, together with Anantacharlu, open up new mines. Komali learns of Dayanidhi's good fortune and arrives, promising to stay with him all her life, but he stops short of consummating their relationship. Hearing his wife Indira is dying of tuberculosis, Dayanidhi visits her to perform the last rites. On returning, he visits Amritam, who has just given birth, and suspects the new baby might be his own.

Local outrage over Dayanidhi's mining and his illicit relationship with Komali eventually forment an uprising in which his home is burnt down, and he is forced to flee with Komali, his first love. Dayanidhi realizes she is, in a sense, a mirror of his own pursuit of freedom and that they can live together, embodying the independence both have always sought.

== Analysis ==
In Chivaraku Migiledi, the story of Dayanidhi starts with a psychological problem and ends in self-realization. After the death of his mother, Dayanidhi becomes alienated from the society and his self. When Komali returns, he finds his true self and his mother's image is enshrined in his psyche. He concludes the end of the journey is in coming to terms with oneself and accepting the image of one's psyche, which leads to peace with the outside world.

== Reception ==
Chivaraku Migiledi is considered to be a magnum opus of Butchi Babu; critics praised it for its study of human psychology. It was translated into English by Kakani Chakrapani as Ultimate Remanence and included in Four Classics of Telugu Fiction.
