= Kokkonda Venkata Ratnam Pantulu =

- కొక్కొండ వేంకటరత్నం (Telugu)
- Born: Kokkonda Venkata Ratnam; Vinukonda, Guntur district, Andhra Pradesh, India
- Died: February 19, 1915 (aged 72–73)
- Occupation(s): Sanskrit and Telugu writer

Kokkonda Venkata Ratnam Pantulu (1842–1915) was a well-known Telugu and Sanskrit writer in the nineteenth century. As a respect word pantulu meaning scholar was added. He was known as Andhra Johnson and is remembered as the multifaceted Andhra genius, the pioneer of many movements in social reform, literature, publication, journalism.

== Writings ==
In 1867, he published incomplete Mahasvetha. This was never published as a book, although a portion of it was serialized in a literary monthly published form. It is evident from the serialized portion that the author had desired to give a Telugu rendering of the episode of Mahasveta from the Sanskrit Kadambari.

In 1876 his poem was selected and published in the Anglo-Indian Prize Poems By Native and English Writers, in Commemoration of the visit of Prince of Wales to India.

His Narakasura Vijayam, a translation of Varanasi Dharma Suri's Sanskrit 'Vyayoga' was first published in 1872. It is believed to be the first Telugu drama to be printed. Since this was first ever translation to Telugu, he had to work out his own path for it. He tried to capture the meaning but also used the same sound (similar word) as far as possible. He also brought out the nuances of the style according to the situation in the original.

He also wrote verses using new meters named after metals like silver, gold, etc., for instance, a meter called Seesam (lead) in Telugu.

His other plays include Dhananjaya Vij'aya Vyayogam, Prasanna Raghavam, Panchatantram, Simhachala Yatra, Bilveswara Satakam, Bilveswareeya Prabhandham, Mangalagiri Mayathyam, Korukonda Mahathyam, Godavari Varnam, Godavari Manjari, Deekshita Charitram, Yuva Raja Paryatanam.

He was the editor of journal Andhra Bhasa Sanjivani (1871–91) which covered a broad range of literary, social and contemporary issues. After him, Kandukuri Veeresalingam took the post.

== Writing philosophy ==
He was a die hard purist and follower of Paravastu Chinnayasuri style of prose writing and wrote Vigrahamu and Sandhi. He ensued a literary warfare with Kandukuri Veeresalingam, for whom linguistic reform was a part of his social reform movements.

Magnum Opus, Bilveswareeyan with 3442 poems was reprinted by Sri Sri Ratna Kamalambika Seva Trust. On 26 March 2013, local TV DD Saptagiri channel broadcast a review of this book.
