= Paravastu Chinnayasuri =

Telugu writer (1806-1862)

- పరవస్తు చిన్నయ సూరి
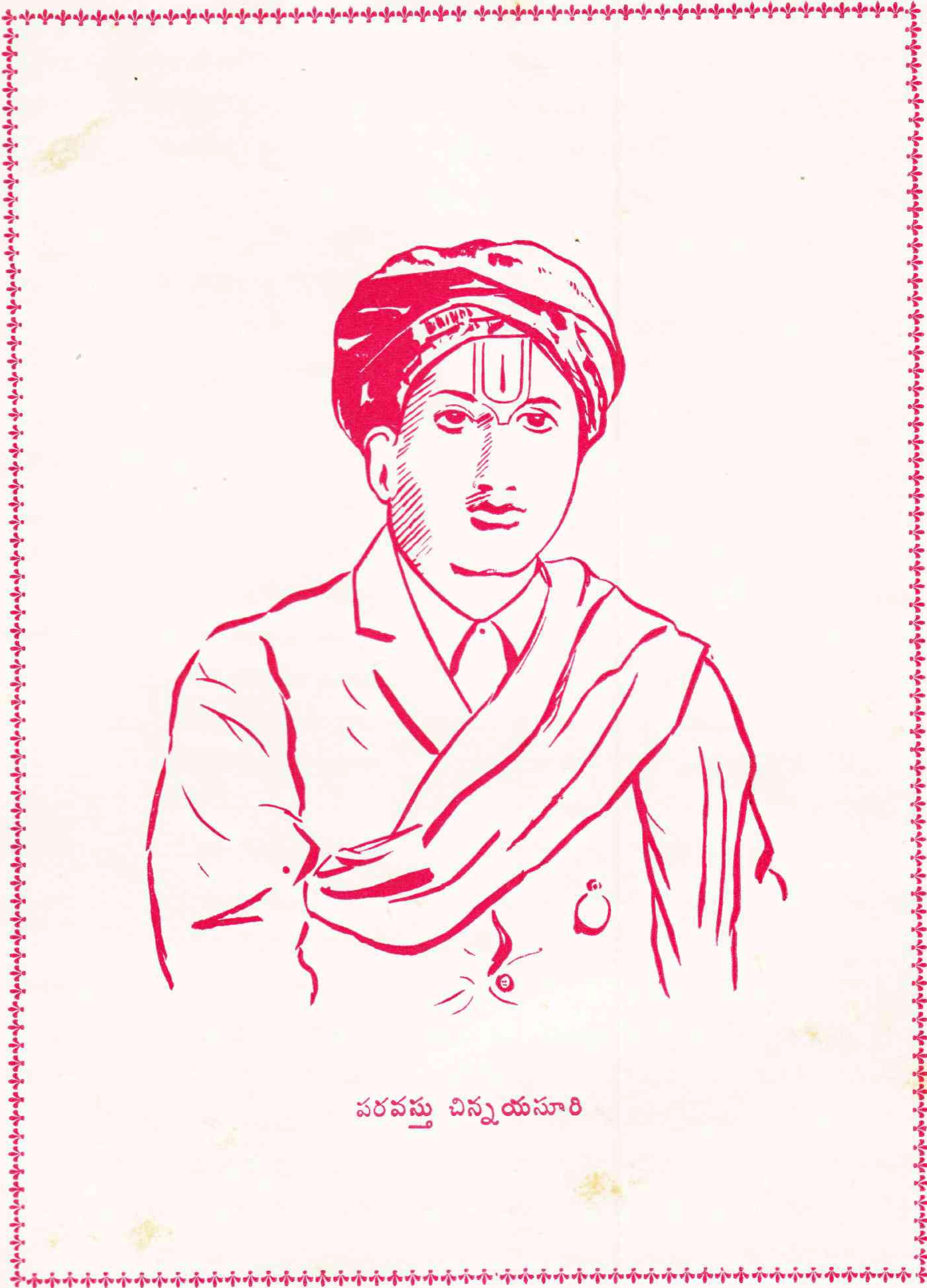
- Born: Chinnaya; 1806; Sriperumbdur, Madras Presidency, British India
- Died: 1862 (aged 55–56)
- Occupations: Teacher and writer
- Relatives: Paravastu Venkataranga Ramanujacharyulu and Srinivasamba (parents)
- Writing career
- Language: Telugu
- Notable works: Nīticaṃdrika, Bālavyākaraṇamu
- Literary movement: Telugu prose

Paravastu Chinnayasuri (1806/7–1861/2) was a Telugu writer who played a prominent role in the elevation of prose to importance in Telugu literature. He was the first Telugu Pandit at the Presidency College, Madras. He also worked as a law scholar for the Supreme Court of East India Company. He was acclaimed as a profound scholar in Telugu and Sanskrit in the traditional education. More than a third of his life span was spent in teaching Telugu in schools and in the Presidency college, Madras.

== Life ==
Paravastu Chinnayasuri was born in 1806/7 in Perambur of Chengalpattu district in a Satani family He was the son of Venkata Rangayya, a Vaishnavite scholar. He worked as a Telugu teacher at Pachaiyappa's College in Madras. He also worked as a law scholar for the Supreme Court of East India Company. He was a Pundit in the Telugu, Sanskrit, Prakrit, and Tamil languages. He died in 1861/2.

== Literary works ==
Chinnayasuri translated the first two books of the Sanskrit Panchatantra into Telugu, entitling his translation the Nīticaṃdrika. It was published by Vavilla Ramaswamy Sastrulu and Sons in Madras. He wrote the Bālavyākaraṇamu (transl. Children's Grammar), a textbook for teaching Telugu grammar in schools. He translated Thomas Lumisden Strange's Manual of Hindoo Law of 1856, entitling it the Hiṃdūdharmaśāstrasaṃgrahamu.
