= Kalahastisvara Satakamu =

Collection of poems by Dhurjati

Kannappa offering eyes to Shiva Linga at Srikalahasthi and Shiva intervening to prevent Kannappa from sacrificing his eye is described in Kalahastisvara Satakamu. This releif is carved on a mukha mandapa pillar of Arunachaleswarar temple in Tiruvannamalai

The Kalahastisvara Satakamu is a collection of poems composed in Telugu by Dhurjati, who has been described as an ashtadiggaja in the Vijayanagara court of Krishnadevaraya. The poems are dedicated to the form of Shiva venerated at the Kalahasti temple. They are well-known by Telugu-speaking audiences.

A Satakamu text generally comprises a collection of one hundred poems in praise of a deity. The manuscripts of this text contain somewhere between 21 and 129 poems. Each poem ends with an invocation of Shiva, the god of Kalahasti. The poems primarily concern devotion to Shiva as a means to liberation from karma.

After the introduction of the printing press in the nineteenth century, print copies of the already popular Kalahastisvara Satakamu circulated among Telugu audiences. A selection of these poems has been translated by Velcheru Narayana Rao and Hank Heifetz. The collection was published by the University of California Press.
