= Chatuva =

Occasional poem

In the Telugu language, a chatuva is an occasional poem prompted by a specific event, person, or object. Spontaneity is the defining characteristic of the genre.
