= Duvvuru Ramireddy =

Indian, Telugu language novelist (1895–1947)

Duvvuru Ramireddy (November 9,1895–September 11,1947) was an eminent Telugu poet. He was born in a farmers family in Nellore district of Andhra Pradesh. He won many laurels including the title Kavikokila in 1929 by the Andhra Maha Parishad, Vijayawada. RamiReddy wrote prabandhas, Kandakavyas and also translated romantic poetry from Sanskrit and Arabic. Besides he provided Lyrics and Dialogues to Telugu films. He also wrote "Hyderabad Paryatana" in Telugu language.

== Literary works ==
Duvvuru Ramireddy started his literary career with his 1918 poetry Vanakumari. Krishivaludu (The Tiller of the Land) followed it in 1919. His well-known work Paanasala the translation of The Rubáiyát of Omar Khayyám, was published in 1935. His other works include Phalitakesamu (1944), Nalajaramma, Swatantra Radham and Agnipravesamu. He also wrote and elegy on the death of his wife expressing his inconsolable grief.

Duvvuru has also worked in Telugu film industry as lyricist and dialogue writer. He provided dialogues to movies like Balaji (1939, remade 1960 as Sri Venkateswara Mahatyam with dialogue by Aathreya). He also provided lyrics to 1939 movie Nala Doutyamu.
