= Madhurantakam Rajaram =

Indian writer (1930–1999)

- Born: 5 October 1930; Dammalcheruvu, Tirupati district, Andhra Pradesh
- Died: 1 April 1999 (aged 68); Tirupati, Tirupati district, Andhra Pradesh
- Citizenship: India
- Occupation: Teacher
- Spouse: Nagabhooshanamma
- Children: Narendra, Mahendra, Manjula
- Writing career
- Genre: Story writer
- Notable work: Madhurantakam Rajaram Kathalu
- Notable awards: Sahitya Akademi Award

Madhurantakam Rajaram (Telugu: మధురాంతకం రాజారాం) (5 October 1930 – 1 April 1999) was an Indian author who is considered one of the foremost of modern Telugu short story writers. He is the winner of Sahitya Akademi Award of 1993 and Katha prize for short stories for the years 1991 and 1993.

== Early life and literary career ==
Rajaram was born in Damalcheruvu village of Tirupati district of Andhra Pradesh state. Rajaram worked as Telugu teacher at Zilla parishath high school of Damalcheruvu and wrote stories to prominent Telugu dailies. In the span of over five decades he wrote many short stories depicting the lives of middle-class or lower-middle-class people in Rayalaseema region of Andhra Pradesh. His collection of short stories include Madhurantakam Rajaram kathalu, Halikulu Kushalama etc. and he has also tested other genre of writing such as plays. In its citation, Sahitya Akademi said that "Madhurantakam Rajaram Kathalu is recognized as a masterpiece of Indian short fiction in Telugu for its faithful delineation of the outer and inner life of the rustic folk, its proper employment of dialect, its total comprehension of social and existential reality and its directness and force of narration."

Madhurantakam Rajaram's sons Madhurantakam Narendra and Madhurantakam Mahendra are also accomplished story writes, some times they are collectively referred as Madhurantakam Trio.

== Honours ==
- 1968 Andhra Pradesh Sahitya Academy Award for Short stories
- Tanjore Tamil University Award for Translations
- 1990 Kondepudi Srinivasa Rao Sahiti Satkaram by Arasam Guntur
- 1991 Gopichand Sahiti satkaram (Hyderabad)
- 1993 Sahitya Academy Award for Short stories
- 1994 Honorary Doctorate by Sri Krishnadevaraya University
- 1996 Prathibaamoorthi Puraskaaram by Appa Josyula-Vishnu Bhotla Foundation (USA)

== Literary works ==
- Varshinchina Megham
- Praanadaata
- Taanu Veliginchina Deepaalu
- Punarnavam
- Kalyanakinkini
- Kammatemmera
- Vakragathulu – Ithara Kathalu
- Vagapetiki
- Vinodapradarsanam
- Revati Prapancham
- Madhurantakam Rajaram kathalu – 4 Volumes (Won Sahitya Academy Award)

=== As editor ===
- Tholinaati Telugu Kathalu
- Oka Dasaabdi Telugu Kathalu
- Telugu Kathakulu – Kathana Reethulu
