= Barrister Parvateesam =

Telugu language humorous novel written by Mokkapati Narasimha Sastry

- Author: Mokkapati Narasimha Sastry
- Language: Telugu
- Genre: Humour
- Publication date: 1924
- Publication place: India
- Media type: Print

Barrister Parvateesam (Telugu: బారిష్టరు పార్వతీశం) is a Telugu language humorous novel written by Mokkapati Narasimha Sastry in 1924. It was printed in three parts. This work is regarded as one of the best written novels in India.

== Plot ==
=== First Part ===
It describes the naive Parvateesam running away from home in Mogalthur, a small town that he calls a "famous historical city" in the West Godavari district of Andhra Pradesh, to become a barrister. The novel depicts the troubles he faced in dealing with other languages, and the naive way he behaves with people from the outside world. It ends with his reaching the shores of England. With the struggle for independence barely beginning in south India, Parvateesam decides to leave for England because his teacher and friends taught him; he thinks becoming a barrister is the only way to redeem himself. He runs away from home without much money. He knows no language other than Telugu and believes that once he reaches Madras (now Chennai, the capital city of then Madras State) he can take a ship to England. He knows nothing of the hardships of this journey.

=== Second Part ===
The second part begins with him reaching the shores of England. After spending a few days in London, he travels to Edinburgh in Scotland on the advice of a recent acquaintance to study at university there. He finds some students from India, who help him settle down and mingle with the local population. With the help of a tutor, he studies to pass the entrance exam at the University of Edinburgh.

While making a fool of himself in several social situations, he learns the new culture and is impressed by the educational system. He dates a Scottish girl, a novel experience for him, coming from a totally traditional and conservative culture. He mingles as well with the local population as with the migrant Indian community. He learns to play golf well.

He describes the situation in Scotland during the First World War. Even as war is raging, he finishes his studies to qualify as a Barrister-at-Law and returns to India. He is happy to return to his homeland.

=== Third Part ===
The third part begins with him reaching the shores of Bombay. Having grown accustomed to western culture over three years, he is baffled by the bureaucracy and lethargy of the Indian populace. He makes his way to his native village, much to the relief of his parents. Much to his embarrassment, he is feted by his high school and the local Bar association for having returned from a foreign land with an advanced education.

He is stigmatized for having helped a married woman get into a bullock cart by holding her hand. He forgets for a moment that he is back in his traditional and conservative village where no form of physical contact is allowed between the opposite sexes.

He gets married and starts to practice law in the Madras High Court, under the tutelage of a senior advocate and Tanguturi Prakasam Panthulu. Gradually he comes into contact with freedom fighters such as Duggirala Gopalakrishnayya, who are followers of Mahatma Gandhi. He also gets vexed with law practice. He participates in the freedom movement and goes to prison several times.
