= Mokkapati Narasimha Sastry =

Indian novelist (1892–1973)

- మొక్కపాటి నరసింహశాస్త్రి
- Writing career
- Genres: Drama, short story, humour
- Notable work: Barrister Parvateesam

Mokkapati Narasimha Sastry (1892–1973) was an Indian novelist known for his works in the Telugu language. He is best recognized for his 1924 comedy novel, Barrister Parvateesam. While this novel is his most acclaimed work, Sastry also wrote numerous plays, short stories, and essays throughout his literary career.

Sastry was proficient in various genres, with a particular emphasis on humour, which pervades much of his writing. His collection of six plays showcases his versatility, with some displaying traces of European influence while retaining his unique style.

== Works ==
Notable plays by Sastry include:

- Mrokkubadi: A one-act play centered on the belief that one can overcome illness or danger by making a vow to please the deity Venkateswara.
- Abhyudayam: Composed in 1940, this play examines the conflict between humanism against the backdrop of the Great War.
- Pedda Mamayya: A romantic play infused with elements of love, awe, and humour.
- Asadharana Samavesamu: A social satire that humorously portrays modern associations and aspirations.
- Varasatvam: This play explores the desire for a legacy, highlighting the dissatisfaction of a young man named Venkata Rao with his life circumstances.
- Pativratyam: A short play that depicts the struggles of a young man raised in a modern context, illustrating the tension between Western and Oriental civilizations.
