= Telugu language policy =

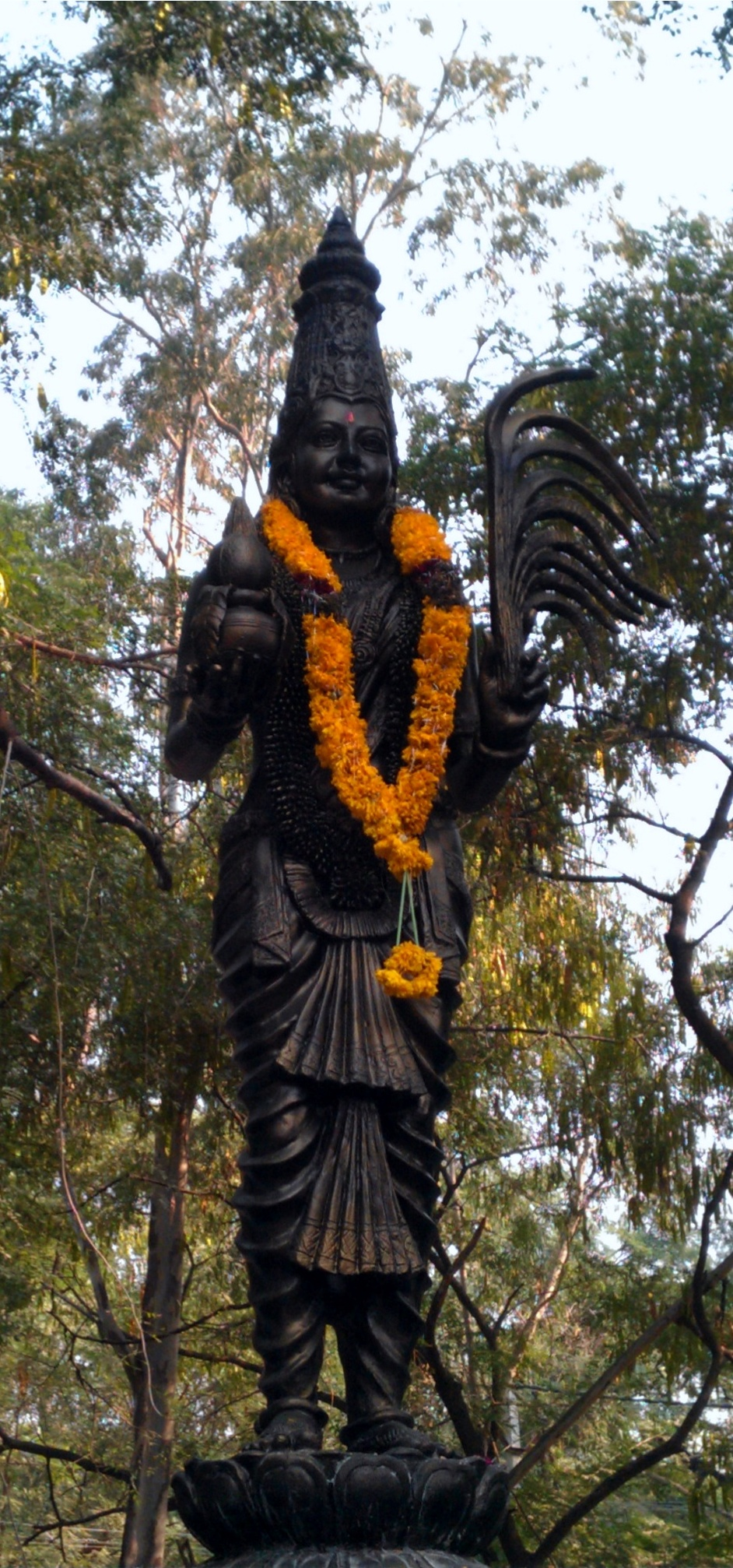
Statue of Telugu Thalli, symbol of the Telugu people

Telugu language policy is a policy issue in the Indian states of Andhra Pradesh and Telangana, with 84 percent of the population reporting Telugu as their first language in Andhra Pradesh prior to the creation of the State of Telangana. Telugu-language advocates decry a lack of incentivisation and government support for the language, and press for their linguistic rights for Telugu's greater recognition and promotion.

== Present status ==
Telugu and English are the two dominant languages of instruction in the schools of Andhra Pradesh and Telangana, while there are also schools who use other regional languages such as Urdu as the medium of instruction. Telugu is a compulsory subject in schools in both states, with fluency in the language being a requirement for matriculation.

The government in Andhra Pradesh is working to increase the number of English medium state schools, with some proposals calling for English to be the only medium of instruction in state schools, claiming that this policy reflects the growing desire of parents and that the state sector is losing pupils due to its inability to meet the increased demand for English medium schools. In Telangana, the government has issued plans to mandate English-medium education in all the private schools in the state. The trend towards English-medium education has caused alarm among some Telugu-language activists who claim that the state governments are placing the language in an inferior position and depriving Telugu-speakers of their language rights. Passions have been further inflamed by anecdotal reports of students in English-language schools being punished for speaking Telugu.

Many educated Telugu people began travelling around the world in search of knowledge-based jobs, and have observed that many countries are prospering faster than India by imparting education in their native languages without depending on English. Throughout India, native-language advocates are demanding less reliance on English.

== Telugu promotion ==
In 2012 the Andhra Pradesh official-language commission resumed its activities, and was tasked with organizing the fourth World Telugu Conference (WTC) after a 22-year hiatus. The conference was a success, with 5,000 Telugu delegates from all over the world meeting in Tirupati.

=== Implementations ===
- Compulsory subject up to the 10th standard in the state beginning in the 2013-14 academic year.
- In 2012, the government of Andhra Pradesh announced that all shop and business signs must be written prominently in Telugu.
- Teachers who punish students speaking Telugu on school premises will be sanctioned, with persistently-offending schools de-recognized.
- Joining the World Unicode Consortium and developing a Unicode-based script for Telugu.
- Official correspondence from the village to the state-secretariat level will be in Telugu, with all official documents signed in Telugu.
- Annual statewide events, such as Telugu Language Day (celebrated on Gidugu Venkata Ramamoorty's birthday), International Mother Tongue Day, Official Language Day, and Charles Phillip Brown's birthday to inspire Telugu-language development.
- ₹20 lakh to each district to promote Telugu language and culture in 2012–2013.
- Greetings and awards by the state government for encouraging correspondence in Telugu.
- All court proceedings and judgments, except for the High Court, will be in Telugu.
- The state government proclaimed 2013 as Telugu Development Year.

=== Initiatives ===
- A ministry will be formed to promote Telugu, translating books, expanding vocabulary and reviving Telugu fine arts and literature academies. software requirement,
- Preference for Telugu-medium students in state-government hiring

== Voluntary initiatives ==
Print and visual Telugu media have taken steps to reduce English in Telugu programs, using appropriate alternate Telugu words. The Andhra Cricket Association has translated the National Cricket Academy's (NCA) coaching manuals into Telugu.

== See also ==
- Universal Declaration of Linguistic Rights
- International Telugu Institute
- States of India by Telugu speakers
- Cinema of Andhra Pradesh
- Telugu language day
- List of newspapers in India by readership
- List of Telugu-language television channels
- Andhra Mahasabha
- Telugu Radio
