= Muddu Narasimham Naidu =

Indian writer and social reformer (1792–1856)

S. Muddu Narasimham Naidu
- Born: 1792; Rajahmundry, Madras Presidency, British India (now in Andhra Pradesh, India)
- Died: 1856 (aged 63–64); Rajahmundry, Madras Presidency, British India (now in Andhra Pradesh, India)
- Occupations: Writer; Social reformer
- Known for: Hitasūchani

S. Muddu Narasimham Naidu (1792–1856) was an Indian writer and social reformer considered to be the first essayist in Telugu. He was a pioneer of the popular language movement, the widow remarriage movement and the rationalist movement in Andhra through his writings. He was a government officer by profession and served as a District Munsif in Rajahmundry.

Narasimham Naidu's essay collection, titled Hitasūchani, was published in 1862 after his death. It is considered to be the first Telugu book in the essay format. It is perhaps the earliest Telugu work promoting rational and scientific ideas predating the works of Kandukuri Veeresalingam. It was written in colloquial Telugu and dealt with several issues such as reforms in education, marriage among others. These essays were printed earlier in a Telugu journal, Hitavadi, published from Machilipatnam.

== Early life ==
Muddu Narasimham Naidu was born in 1792 in an Adi Velama family in Rajahmundry of present-day Andhra Pradesh. He attained English education with great difficulty. He was one of the earliest English-educated persons in Andhra.

His surname is variously given as Swamineena, Swamineni, Samineni, Samineena in different sources. His first name is also given as either Narasimha Naidu or Narasimham Naidu. Writer and journalist Samineni Muddu Krishna (1889–1973) was his great-grandson.

== Career ==
Entering the service of the East India Company, Narasimham Naidu gradually rose in the service. He was a second grade District Munsif from 1848 to 1852. In 1853 he was promoted to a first class District Munsif.

== Writings ==
Naidu's essay collection, titled Hitasūchani, was published in 1862 after his death by his son Ranga Prasada Rao Naidu. It is estimated to have been written around 1850. It is considered to be the first Telugu book in the essay format. These essays were printed earlier in a Telugu journal, Hitavadi, published from Machilipatnam. In his works, Naidu adopted the spoken language of the learned, deliberately in opposition to the archaic literary language used by his contemporary Chinnaya Suri. He called his style grama bhasha (colloquial language).

Naidu used the word prameyamu for the essay, rather than vyasamu, the more common word. He also gave an English title to the book — Moral Instructor in Prose. The book contains eight prameyas (subjects or issues) and discussed various issues like education, marriage, superstitions, modern medicine etc. Naidu in his book wondered if the traditional grammatical theories and classical prose writings had any relevance to contemporary society and its requirements. Hita Suchani was republished in 1986 by Andhrakesari Yuvajana Samithi, Rajahmundry with a foreword by Aarudra.

== Views ==
Naidu in his writings protested against Kanyasulkam and child marriages, advocated for widow remarriage, marriages of girls only after the age of puberty, and pleaded for mutual consent of bride and groom before a marriage is finalised.

He advocated for the introduction of scientific education and for the translation of scientific work from English to vernacular languages. He condemned popular superstitions like belief in the existence of evil spirits and the practices of witch doctors. In order to escape from epidemics like cholera, he exhorted people to observe cleanliness and to take proper medical care, rather than engage in blind worship of village deities. He also criticised extravagance in wedding ceremonies. He proved with the help of slokas that marriages in the past were performed only after girls attained proper age and maturity of mind. He thus condemned the system of child marriages and suggested a marriageable age of 12 for girls and 16 for boys.

== Legacy ==
Narasimham Naidu is considered to be the first essayist in Telugu. He was a pioneer of the popular language movement, the widow remarriage movement and the rationalist movement in Andhra. Naidu was progressive in his outlook and made his essays instruments of social change. He championed a colloquial literary style in his essays.

As per Aarudra, in 1924 Gidugu Ramamurthy lauded Narasimham Naidu as a champion of popular language (Vyavaharika Bhasha) and a pioneering social reformer even before the advent of Brahmo Samaj in Andhra.

According to Kancha Ilaiah, Brahmanical pandits "killed" Hitasuchani with total silence. While writers like Kandukuri Veeresalingam and Gurajada Appa Rao were projected as social reformers, Narasimham Naidu and his book were not mentioned in any school or college textbook. As per Ilaiah, Naidu's text challenged the Brahmanical notions of life and its language, idiom and content were chosen to educate and reform the whole Telugu society, and not a particular caste or social group.

V. Ramakrishna was of the opinion that Veeresalingam was influenced by Narasimham Naidu's writings. N. Putali Krishnamurthi also remarked in a similar fashion:

"It looks as if Veeresalingam was inspired by the writings of Muddu Narasimha Naidu. Veeresalingam canvassed for exactly the same reforms which were supported by Muddu Narasimha Naidu. But it is surprising that, no where in his voluminous writings did he make even a passing acknowledgement to his predecessor in this field of social reform."
