= Vakati Panduranga Rao =

Indian writer and journalist (1934–1999)

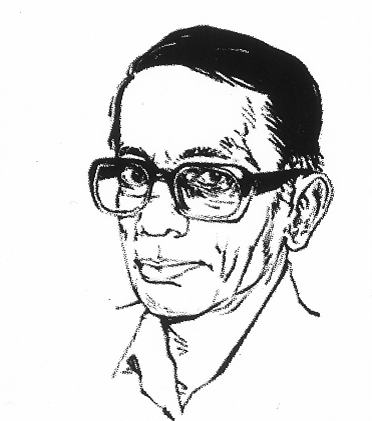
- A sketch of Vakati Panduranga Rao
- Born: 1934; Madras (now Chennai)
- Died: 17 April 1999 (aged 64–65)
- Occupation: Journalist
- Known for: Columns, stories and poetry

Vakati Panduranga Rao (1934 – 17 April 1999) was an Indian short story writer and journalist who for a long time edited the Telugu-language weekly, Andhra Prabha. His editorials, under the name Mitra Vakyam, made him immensely popular. A collection of these editorials was published in two volumes. Later, he worked for an English-language newspaper.

His many short stories were on informative themes, like the ones he wrote in Mitra Vakyam, Maranam Oka Kaamaa, and Diksuchi. Twelve of his short stories were compiled into a book named Dvaadasi.

== History ==
He was born in Madras in 1934 and worked in various journalistic capacities for the likes of Anandavani, Andhra Jyothi, Newstime, A.P. Times and the Andhra Prabha Weekly. He also worked for some time as a journalism lecturer at Potti Sriramulu Telugu University and also as the deputy director of Visakhapatnam Port.

== Literary works ==
Panduranga Rao Kathalu, Mithravakyam, Chetha Venna Mudda and Diksuchi are among Rao's most popular literary works. Twelve of his stories were compiled into a book named Dvadasi.

== Awards ==
He was a recipient of the Andhra Sahitya Academy, Gopichand and Telugu University awards. He also edited literary works for the National Book Trust and the Sahitya Akademi.
