= International Telugu Institute =

International Telugu Institute was established by the Government of Andhra Pradesh in 1975 in acceptance of a resolution unanimously adopted by the delegates to the first World Telugu Conference held at Hyderabad. It was later merged with the Potti Sreeramulu Telugu University in 1985 and renamed as the International Telugu Centre.

The institute has three departments – the Department of Society and Culture; the Department of Languages, Literature and Translation; and the Department of Publications.

== Main objectives ==
- to promote educational and cultural contacts and popularize Telugu teaching and language learning among the Telugu speaking people and lovers of Telugu in other states in India and abroad;
- to conduct research and study in the areas of Telugu language, literature, history, arts, culture and allied fields;
- to undertake book exhibitions and publications of monographs, books, journals and research papers pertaining to the life and culture of Telugu people;
- to organise study courses and training programmes for the benefit of overseas scholars visiting Andhra Pradesh

== Publications ==
The institute has been collaborating with the Central Institute of Indian Languages, Mysore for conducting language environment camps. It is also bringing out a monthly journal entitled Telugu Vaani in English and Telugu. It has published four monographs – Burma lo Telugu Vaani, Mauritius lo Telugu Vaani, Pandugalu Pabbalu and Vernacularisation of Literacy - the Telugu Experiment.

The institute has taken up a scheme of publishing monographs on the life and mission of the important Telugu persons based on the Lectures organized by them. During the year 1983–85, they have released monographs on:

1. Alluri Sitarama Raju
2. Kasinathuni Nageswara Rao
3. Madapati Hanumantha Rao
4. Komarraju Venkata Lakshmana Rao
5. Gurajada Appa Rao
6. Gidugu Rama Murthy Pantulu
7. Kandukuri Veeresalingam Pantulu
8. Poosapati Ananda Gajapati Raju
9. Kodi Rama Murthy Naidu
10. Potti Sri Ramulu and Nannaya

The monogram on Poosapati Ananda Gajapati Raju was written by Dr. V. V. B. Rama Rao and published by the institute in August 1985.

== Lectures ==
The institute has been organizing periodical lectures in memory of illustrious Telugu persons.

- Kandukuri Veeresalingam Panthulu Memorial Lecture at Madras in May 1979.
- Kasinadhuni Nageswara Rao Memorial Lecture at Bombay in December 1979.
- Sir Raghupati Venkatratnam Naidu Memorial Lecture at Calcutta in July 1980
- Dr. Sarvepalli Radhakrishnan Memorial Lecture at Delhi in December 1980.
