= Telangana dialect =

Variety of Telugu

- తెలంగాణ భాష
- Pronunciation: [ˈtelaŋɡaːɳa bʰaːʂə]
- Native to: India
- Region: Telangana
- Language family: Dravidian: Southern; Southern II; Teluguic; Telugu; Telangana dialect
- Early form: Proto-Dravidian: Old Telugu
- Writing system: Telugu script

Official status
- Official language in: India: Telangana
- Regulated by: Government of Telangana

Language codes
- ISO 639-3: –
- Telangana

Telangana dialect (Telugu: తెలంగాణ భాష), often referred to by its sub-dialect, Hyderabadi Telugu (Telugu: హైదరాబాదీ తెలుగు), is a dialect of the Telugu language. It is spoken mostly in the Indian state of Telangana. It is influenced by Hyderabadi Urdu, a dialect of Deccani Urdu, at least in the vocabulary.

== History ==
This language's history can be tracked back around the early centuries of BCE. The language spoken in the Telangana region during the BCE era was referred to as 'Andhramu' or early Telugu. When this region was under the rule of Satavahana, Ikshwaku, and Vishnukundins the official languages are Sanskrit and Prakrit. The establishment of Delhi Sultanate around the 14th century CE. Later, other Muslim empires such as the Tughlaq dynasty and Bahmani Sultanate, influenced the culture of the Hyderabad area, as well as the Telangana region. The Qutb Shahi dynasty, established in 1518, played a key role in shaping Hyderabadi Telugu. The empire had extended to smaller portions in present-day Maharashtra and Karnataka. This introduced more Marathi and Kannada loanwords into the language. Another key reason for the evolution of the dialect was the influence of Islamic dynasties, whose official languages were Persian and Deccani Urdu. The Telangana movement brought the term 'Telangana Language' to the forefront. The term was officially recognized when the Telangana government declared September 9th as Telangana Language Day in 2014, to mark the 100th birth anniversary of Kaloji Narayana Rao.

== Vocabulary ==
=== Unique words ===
A few words are unique to the Telangana Telugu, listed below.

Standard Telugu	Telangana Telugu	Meaning
jāgratta (జాగ్రత్త)	pailaṁ (పైలం)	Be careful
dāhaṁ (దాహం)	dūpa (దూప)	thirsty
gōṅgurā (గోంగురా)	puṇṭikūrā (పుంటికూర)	Gongura
ekkaḍa (ఎక్కడ)	ēḍa (ఏడ)	where
akkaḍa (అక్కడ)	āḍa (ఆడ)	there
ikkaḍa (ఇక్కడ)	īḍa (ఈడ)	here
potti (పొట్టి)	buḍḍa (బుడ్డ)	short

=== Loanwords ===
Standard Telugu	Telangana Telugu	Meaning	Source language
baṅgāḷadumpa (బంగాళదుంప)	ālugaḍḍa (ఆలుగడ్డ)	potato	Hindustani/Sanskrit + Telugu
adde (అద్దె)	kirāyi (కిరాయి)	rent	Hindustani
āsupatri (ఆసుపత్రి)	davākhānā (దవాఖానా)	hospital, pharmacy	Hindustani
bābāy (బాబాయ్)	kākā (కాకా)	uncle	Marathi
ḍabbulu (డబ్బులు)	paisalu (పైసలు)	money	Hindustani
prāntaṁ (ప్రాంతం)	jāgā (జాగా)	area	Hindustani
tondara (తొందర)	jaldi (జల్ది/జెల్ది)	quick	Hindustani

== Regional variants ==
There are regional variants in the language. The dialect spoken in the interiors of Telangana has localized influences and varies with community. The border regions have mutual influence with languages on the other side of the border.

== Influence ==
The Telangana language has always influenced the culture of Telangana. The language became notable after the Telangana state was formed. It became influential in politics, cinema, economics, arts, and other fields that are related to Telangana, besides standard Telugu.

== See also ==
- Deccani language
- Hyderabadi Urdu

== Sources ==
- Zvelebil, Kamil (1990), Dravidian Linguistics: An Introduction, Pondicherry Institute of Linguistics and Culture, ISBN 978-81-8545-201-2
