= Rajasekhara Charitramu =

Telugu novel by Kandukuri Veeresalingam

- Cover of Rajasekhara Charitramu
- Author: Kandukuri Veeresalingam
- Language: Telugu
- Genre: Novel
- Published: 1878
- Publication place: India
- Media type: Print

Rajasekhara Charitramu is a Telugu novel written by Kandukuri Veeresalingam in 1878. It was first published as a serial in Viveka Chandrika in 1878 and later as a novel in 1880.

It is widely regarded as one of the first social novels in Telugu literature and remains a landmark in Indian literary history. The novel critiques contemporary social practices and blind beliefs, while advocating for reform. Although inspired by Oliver Goldsmith's The Vicar of Wakefield (1766), Veeresalingam emphasized that his work was largely original and independent in its themes and narrative style. The novel received both critical and popular acclaim.

== Background ==
Rajasekhara Charitramu is often credited with establishing the modern Telugu novel. At the time of its publication, Telugu literature was transitioning from traditional poetic forms to prose narratives. Veeresalingam's novel offered a compelling critique of societal issues such as blind faith, corruption, and patriarchal norms. The book was translated into several languages, including English, Tamil, and Kannada, and became a staple in university syllabi.

Veeresalingam originally intended to translate Oliver Goldsmith's novel, but after completing two or three chapters, he believed that its foreign setting might not resonate with his target audience. As a result, he abandoned the translation and chose to write his own work, Rajasekhara Charitra. While the novel shows some influence from Goldsmith's work, including elements of its plot and a few characters, the majority of the content is an original creation by Veeresalingam.

== Plot ==
The novel follows the story of Rajasekhara, a well-meaning but naive individual whose lack of judgment leads to numerous personal and familial hardships. He spends his wealth on superstitions and fraudulent schemes, eventually losing his fortune. A turning point comes when he saves a man named Ramaraju, who later assists him in reuniting his scattered family. Through a series of challenges, including imprisonment and the near-abduction of his daughter, Rajasekhara learns the importance of rationality and self-reliance. By the end, he reforms his ways and commits to a life free from blind faith and extravagance.

== Themes ==
Veeresalingam used Rajasekhara Charitramu as a vehicle to critique prevailing social issues. The novel highlights:

- The detrimental impact of blind faith and superstitions.
- The exploitation of society by hypocritical priests and fraudulent ascetics.
- The plight of women in a patriarchal society.

Each chapter incorporates incidents that expose societal evils, from false religious practices to familial oppression. Veeresalingam's modernist ideals and reformist zeal are evident throughout the work.

== Literary significance ==
Though not the first Telugu novel, Rajasekhara Charitramu is considered the first influential one. Earlier works, such as Narahari Gopala Krishna Shetty's Sri Rangaraja Charitramu (1872) and translations like Mahaswetha (1867), lacked the narrative depth and reformist vision of Veeresalingam's work. Critics like Dr. Akkiraju Ramapathi Rao have described the novel as a guiding light for subsequent Telugu writers.

== Legacy ==
Rajasekhara Charitramu inspired a wave of social novels in Telugu literature. Prominent authors, including Chilakamarti Lakshminarasimham, acknowledged its influence. The novel also served as a critique of colonial and feudal structures, reflecting Veeresalingam's progressive outlook.

== See also ==
- List of first novels by language
