= Suravaram Pratap Reddy Telugu University =

Language university in Hyderabad, Telangana

- Type: Public
- Established: 1985; 41 years ago
- Founder: N. T. Rama Rao
- Academic affiliations: UGC
- Chancellor: Governor of Telangana
- Vice-Chancellor: V. Nityananda Rao
- Location: Lalitha Kala Kshetram, Near Public Gardens, Nampally, Hyderabad, Telangana, India; 17.3953268°N 78.4696378°E
- Campus: Urban
- Website: https://teluguuniversity.ac.in/

Suravaram Pratap Reddy Telugu University (SPRTU) is a public state university in Hyderabad, Telangana, India. It is one of the few Indian language universities in India.

== University ==
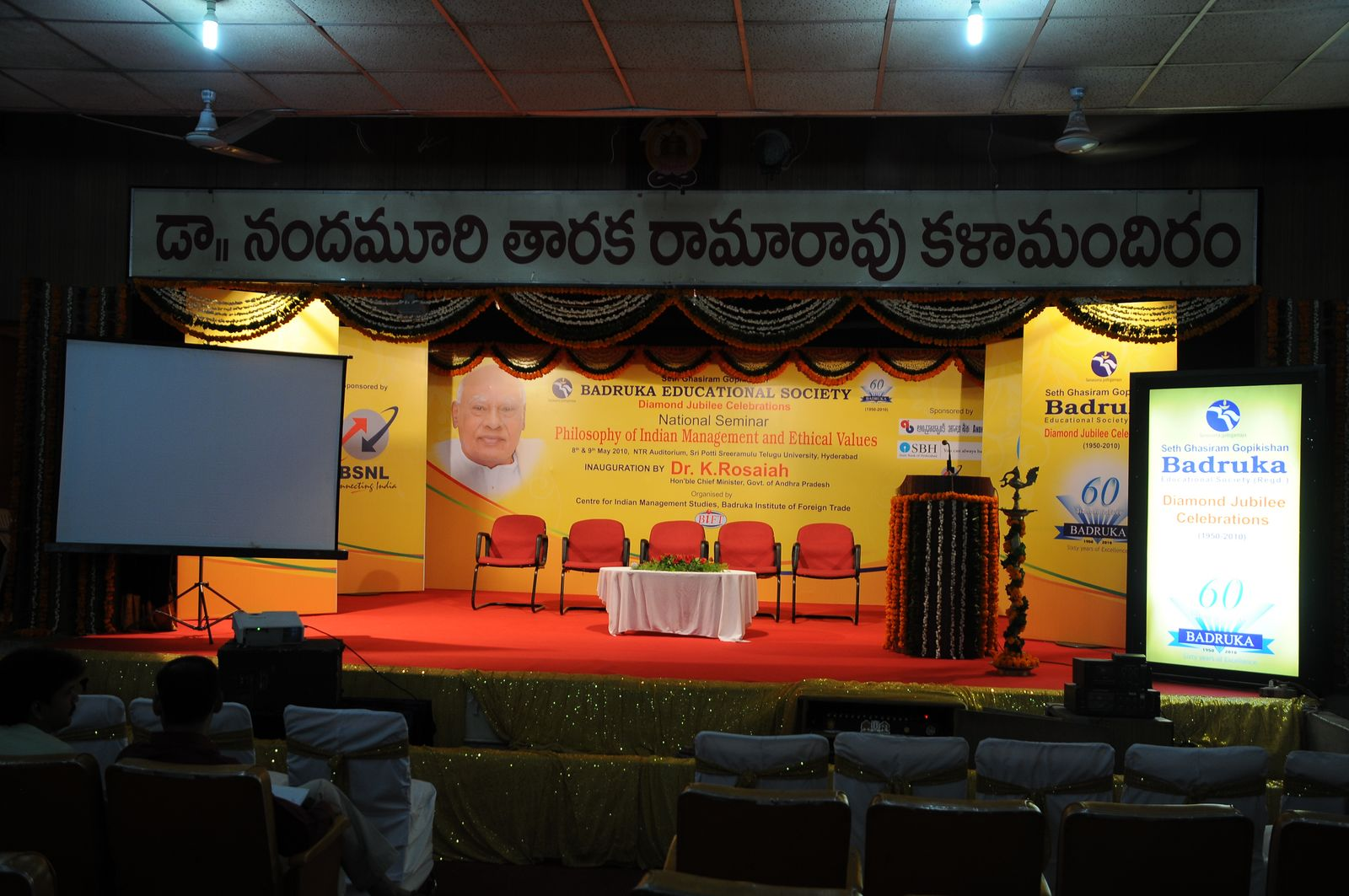
Telugu University Auditorium during the Philosophy of Indian Management and Ethical Values Seminar

It was established as "Telugu University" on 2 December 1985 through an Act of Legislation by the State Legislature of Telangana with headquarters at Hyderabad. The School of Folk and Tribal Lore was established at Warangal during the year 1994. This university was founded with the broad objectives of serving the cause of the Telugu people, both within the State and outside. For this purpose, the state government has merged the Sahitya, Sangeet, Nataka, Nritya, and Lalita Kala Academies, International Telugu Institute, and Telugu Bhasha Samiti into the university. Thus, the university was established to function as a central organization for teaching and research in Language and Literature, History and Culture, Fine Arts and Performing Arts, religion and philosophy of the Telugu speaking people. It strives to inculcate a sense of identity in them as citizens of India and as responsible representatives of Telangana. In March 2025, a bill was passed to rename the university Suravaram Pratap Reddy Telugu University, after Suravaram Pratapa Reddy, a freedom fighter from Telangana.

== Campuses ==
There are two campuses of Telugu University in Telangana:

- Lalita Kalatoranam, Hyderabad
- Potana Pranganam, Warangal

== Library ==
Telugu University Library was established in the year 1985 in Osmania University campus. It has a Campus library at Warangal. Library contains various titles on the subjects like Telugu language, literature, Linguistics, Fine arts, Astrology, Journalism, Culture, Folk arts.

The Central library has equipped with rich collection consisting of about 100,000 books among which 55,000 are Telugu, 43,000 English and 5000 of other Indian languages. It subscribes to about 150 subject journals in Telugu and English. Library is also maintaining about 10,000 back volumes of various journals. The library has acquired rare and unique collection of Palm leaves, Mackenzie manuscripts, letters of C. P. Brown, microfilms of Telugu dailies Krishna Patrika for 40 years (1902–1942), and Andhra Patrika for 26 years (1914–1940).

The university has an invaluable collection of books received by donations/purchase of personal collection of social elites/eminent scholars as a collection development policy. The donors included Mudigonda Subrahmanya Sarma, Seetapati, Mallela Sriramamurti, Kosaraju Raghavaiah, M. V. Rajgopal, Thumati Donappa, Vasireddy Seeta Devi, V. Raja Rao, Mateti Ramappa, P. N. V. Rao, Puranam Subrahmanya Sarma, K. Venkateswara Rao, Abburi Chaya Devi, K. Venkata Ramaraju, Tenneti Purnachandra Rao, Gayatri Rama Rao and Bommakanti Srinivasacharyulu. Libraries purchased from individuals are Nelaturu Venkata Ramanaiah, Mallampalli Somasekhara Sarma, P. S. R. Appa Rao, Rayaprolu Subba Rao, Kothapalli Veerabhadra Rao, P. V. Parabrahmha Sastri and N. S. Sundareswara Rao.

== Museum ==
Telugu University Museum has three galleries. The History gallery has 52 oil paintings. The Contemporary Art gallery has 124 canvas paintings by eminent artists. The Portrait gallery displays 220 portraits of Telugu luminaries in various fields and 211 Nataratnas, distinguished stage artists.

== Official magazine ==
Telugu University is Publishing "Telugu Vaani", a Tri-Monthly Magazine. The Magazine covers news regarding Festivals of Fine Arts, Cultural Programmes, Seminars and other activities of university and its Campuses. It publishes the news of various programmes conducted by Telugu Associations within and outside Andhra Pradesh.

== See also ==
- Kannada University
- Tamil University
- Malayalam University
- Punjabi University
- World Telugu Conference
