= Telugu Language Day =

Annual observance, 29 August

Telugu Language Day తెలుగు భాషా దినోత్సవము
- Observed by: Andhra Pradesh; Government of Andhra Pradesh
- Significance: Birthday of Telugu poet Gidugu Venkata Ramamurthy
- Observances: Presentation of awards for excellence in Telugu; government events
- Date: 29 August
- Next time: 29 August 2027
- Frequency: Annual

Telugu Language Day (Telugu: తెలుగు భాషా దినోత్సవము; IAST: Telugu bhāṣā dinōtsavaṁ; "Day of the Telugu Language") is observed on 29 August each year in the states of Andhra Pradesh and Telangana of the Republic of India. This date was chosen to coincide with the birthday of the Telugu poet Gidugu Venkata Ramamurthy. The Government of Andhra Pradesh provides funds and presents awards with the objective of the betterment of the Telugu language. The Department of Culture is responsible for organising the day on behalf of the government.

== See also ==
- World Telugu Conference
- Telugu New Year
