= Old Telugu =

Ancient form of the Telugu language

- తెనుఙ్గు; తెనుఁగు
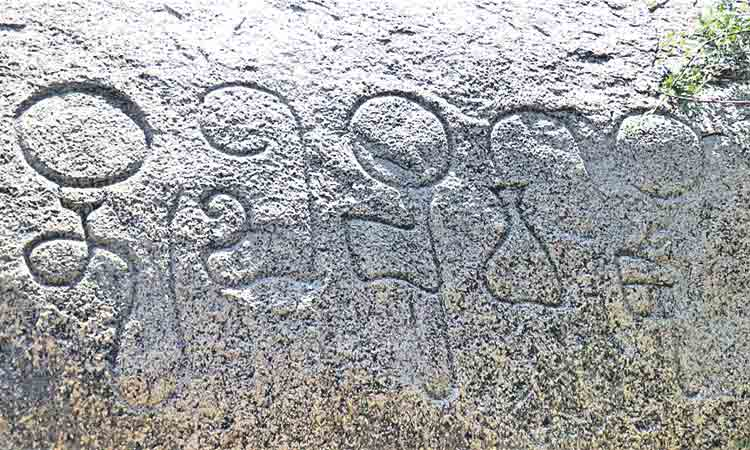
- An Old Telugu inscription found in Keesaragutta, Telangana reading "tolucuvānḍru" (c. 5th century CE)
- Pronunciation: [ˈt̪enuŋgu], [ˈt̪enũgu]
- Region: Andhradesa (modern-day Andhra Pradesh and Telangana, India)
- Ethnicity: Telugus
- Era: c.200 BCE - 1000 CE
- Language family: Dravidian: South Dravidian; South Dravidian II; Old Telugu
- Early form: Proto-Dravidian
- Writing system: Kadamba script; Telugu-Kannada script

Language codes
- ISO 639-3: None (mis)
- Glottolog: oldt1249

Old Telugu (Old Telugu: తెనుఙ్గు, తెనుఁగు, romanized: tenuṅgu, tenũgu; Telugu: పాత తెలుగు, romanized: pāta telugu) is the earliest attested stage of the Telugu language. It is attested in various inscriptions, labels, and in early loanwords.

Old Telugu later evolved into Middle Telugu around 1000 CE, which then evolved into Modern Telugu around 1600 CE.

== Etymology ==
In Modern Telugu, the term used for Old Telugu is పాత తెలుగు pāta telugu. The first word, పాత pāta, meaning "old/ancient," is descended from Old Telugu ప్ఴాన్త pḻānta / ప్రాఁత prā̃ta, ultimately from the reconstructed Proto-Dravidian word *paḻan-(tta), of the same meaning. The word తెలుగు telugu is descended from Old Telugu తెనుఙ్గు tenuṅgu / తెనుఁగు tenũgu.

The reconstructed Old Telugu term for the Old Telugu language is ప్ఴాన్దెనుఙ్గు pḻāndenuṅgu / ప్రాఁదెనుఁగు prā̃denũgu. This word was not attested in Old Telugu, but functions as a neologism commonly used for descriptive purposes. The word consisted of the adjectival prefix ప్ఴాన్- pḻān- / ప్రాఁ prā̃-, and a sandhi form of the word తెనుఙ్గు tenuṅgu / తెనుఁగు tenũgu. The adjectival prefix is the same morpheme as ప్ఴాన్త pḻānta / ప్రాఁత prā̃ta, thus deriving from Proto-Dravidian *paḻan-.

== Attestation ==
Some of the earliest attestations of Old Telugu can be found as the loan words in Prakrit inscriptions and literature dating to the early CE, including in Gaha Sattasai where several words like attā, vāluṁki, pīluā, pōṭṭaṁ, vēṇṭa, etc. are said to be of Old Telugu origin. A granite pillar in the Amaravati Stupa bears the Old Telugu word nāgabu dated to 2nd century BCE. A label found in Keesaragutta, reading tolacuvānḍru is dated to c. 400 CE. The earliest recorded long inscription was discovered in Kalamalla, dated to 575 CE. Several Old Telugu titles were found in the stone inscriptions issued by Mahendra Pallava dated to c.600 CE. Addanki inscription, laid in 848 CE bears the earliest recorded Telugu poem in taruvōja prosody. Pre-Nannaya era of Telugu literature, prior to c.1000 CE is believed to be dominated by Jain poets, including Pampa, Jinavallabha, Vemulawada Bheema Kavi, Sarvadeva and others, whose works have not survived to the present day. The first Telugu treatise on Prosody by Malliya Rechana has survived, it deals with adopted(from Sanskrit) and native Telugu metres, written around 940 CE.

== Phonology ==
In Old Telugu, the inherited Proto-Dravidian consonantal system was fairly well preserved except for incorporating the feature of voicing from the earliest known period. Other phonological innovations include:

- Old Telugu maintained a three-way distinction of coronal consonants which includes, alveolar, retroflex and dental stops. ḏ was originally derived from PDr post-nasal *-ṯ- and constrasted with intervocalic trill -ṟ-. In very few cases -ḏ- did appear intervocalically, eg. caḏu (> ceḍu) vs. pāṟum but it was mostly an allophone of ṟ before n, eg. mūnḏu.
- Voiceless stops appeared at medial positions, by the simplification of geminates after a long vowel and a nasal, eg. *tōṇṭṭa > tōṇṭa (> tōṭa) 'garden'.
- Pre-plosive nasals are allophones in both Old and Modern Telugu; i.e., n before dentals, ṇ before retroflexes, ṉ before alveolars, ṅ before velars, ñ before palatals and m before labials.
- Aspirated consonants were borrowed from Indo-Aryan and were incorporated into the writing system, although colloquially the contrast of aspirated-unaspirated stops largely remained absent in most dialects and accents, even in Modern Telugu.
- Apical displacement was progressive for certain period of time, resulting in word-initial apical consonants in some words. This change was initiated in pre-historic times and is recorded historically, eg. *awanḏu > wānḏu ('that man'/'he'); puḻōl-> pḻōlu (> prōlu) ('city')
- Voicing of word-initial stops was progressive in some words. Both voiced and voiceless word-initials were recorded in inscriptions and might vary dialectally, eg. tūṟu > dūṟu ('to enter'); kaḍacina > gaḍicina ('that which is passed')

Old Telugu Consonants
		Labial	Dental	Alveolar	Retroflex	Palatal	Velar	Glottal
Nasal		m (మ)	n (న)		ɳ (ణ)			
Plosive	Voiceless	p (ప)	t̪ (త)		ʈ (ట)	tʃ (చ)	k (క)	
Plosive	Aspirated	pʰ (ఫ)	t̪ʰ (థ)		ʈʰ (ఠ)	tʃʰ (ఛ)	kʰ (ఖ)	
Plosive	Voiced	b (బ)	d̪ (ద)	d (ౚ, న్ఱ్)	ɖ (డ)	dʒ (జ)	g (గ)	
Plosive	Breathy	bʰ (భ)	d̪ʰ (ధ)		ɖʰ (ఢ)	dʒʰ (ఝ)	gʰ (ఘ)	
Fricative			s (స)		ʂ (ష)	ʃ (శ)		h (హ)
Tap				ɾ (ర)				
Trill				r (ఱ)				
Approximant		ʋ (వ)			ɻ (ఴ)	j (య)		
Lateral approximant				l (ల)	ɭ (ళ)			

- nḏ has its reflex being voiced retroflex stop in Modern Telugu, <ṟṟ> was either pronounced [r:] (derived from /r/) or [t:] (from PD *ṯṯ), former became rr while latter became ṭṭ, eg. goṟiya > goṟṟe > gorre; puṟṟa > puṭṭa.
- ḻ became a plosive other than in clusters where it became r by Middle Telugu, *kuḻ-, *eḻu-paHtu > OTe. kḻocce, ḻebb(h)adi > MTe. krocce, ḍebb(h)adi > Te. kocce, ḍebb(h)ai. Some of the initial retroflexes became dental, e.g. *uẓupp- > duppi.
- Most pre-plosive nasals got deleted by nasalizing the previous vowel in Middle Telugu and later loosing nasalization in Modern Telugu, eg. teluṅgu > telũgu > telugu and other various cluster simplifications like krōlu > kōlu.
- Modern Telugu is mostly free from retroflex ḷ and ṇ. However, dialectally ḷ is preserved as a geminate in plurals (from PDr plural *-Vḷ) as in *nīr-ḷ(u) > nīḷḷu ('waters') and regularly after retroflex ḍ and dental l, eg.: guḍi-ḷu > guḷḷu ('temples') and pagul-ḷu > paguḷḷu ('breakages').

== Grammar ==
=== Morphology ===
Old Telugu is an agglutinative language primarily utilizing suffixes to express grammatical relationships. Noun morphology included gender markers and various derivational processes, while verb morphology was highly developed with distinct markers for tense, mood, and aspect.

Old Telugu preserved the two-way masculine vs non-masculine gender pattern intact, which is said to be the original case with Proto-Dravidian and this is also inherited by Modern Telugu.

Telugu branch is evidenced to have inherited all the four distinct plural markers of Dravidian, which are: -ḷ, -(n)k, -kVḷ and -r. By the time of early writings, -kVḷ marker underwent back-stem formation with the root words, losing its status as a distinct plural marker, eg. mrā̃-kulu (< *maran-kVḷ), later getting analyzed as mrā̃ku-lu, creating a root mrā̃ku (> Modern māku). Other examples include goḍugu, ciluka, eluka, īga.

The noun formative was -ambu, later -ammu >- amu > -am > -aũ, eg. OTe. paṭṭambu ('authority/power') > MTe./Te. paṭṭamu/paṭṭam > spoken Te. paṭṭaũ (coastal dialects).

Old Telugu and Proto-Dravidian maintained contrast in nominative and oblique forms of masculine singulars; as in wāṉḏu (nom.) vs wāni- (obl.), which is dialectally preserved in Modern Telugu.

=== Parts of speech ===
Nouns in Old Telugu could be primary or derived, with primary nouns often being free forms and derived nouns formed through suffixation. Gender was signaled by specific suffixes and the overall morphology was influenced by both native Dravidian elements and Indo-Aryan borrowings.

=== Verbs ===
Old Telugu verbs were categorized into finite and non-finite forms, with various suffixes indicating tense, mood, and agreement with subjects.

The language had two primary tense paradigms: past, non-past.

Past and non-past markers in Old Telugu were: -iti- (a combination of PDr past markers *-i- and *-tt-) and -VdV- (< PDr non-past *-t-) respectively. Pure past marker *-iy/*-i appeared in third person. These markers were followed by personal terminations, also varied by number.

Old Telugu Finite Verb Forms
an- : 'to say'		Past	Non-Past
1st person	singular	an-iti-n	an-eda-n an-udu-n
1st person	plural	an-iti-m	an-eda-m an-udu-m
2nd person	singular	an-iti-w	an-eda-w an-udu-w
2nd person	plural	an-iti-r	an-eda-r an-udu-r
3rd person	sg/non-h.plu	an-iy-en	an-un
3rd person	human plural	an-i-r	an-eda-r an-udu-r

- Epenthetic vowels, -i or -u might be attached at the finals for all the verb forms listed above.

==== Causative Verbs ====
Old Telugu causative verb forms are listed as follows:

		kēy: 'to do'	naḍu: 'to walk'
Past	Participle	kēy-i-ñc-i	naḍa-pi-ñc-i
Past	Finite	kēy-i-ñc-iyen	naḍa-pi-ñc-iyen
	Adjective	kēy-i-ñc-ina	naḍa-pi-ñc-ina
Negative		kēy-i-mp-a-	naḍa-pi-mp-a
Infinitive		kēy-i-mp-an	naḍa-pi-mp-an
Imperative		kēy-i-mp-umu	naḍa-pi-mp-umu
Non-Past		kēy-i-mp-	naḍa-pi-mp-

Imperatives were formed by the addition of stems -umu (tin-umu: 'eat') in singular/non-honorific and -uṇḍu (tin-uṇḍu: 'eat') in plural/honorific usages, which became -Ø and -aṇḍi in Modern Telugu.

=== Pronouns ===
The pronominal system in Old Telugu marked person, number, and gender. Reflexive pronouns and a range of demonstratives, interrogatives, and indefinites were also used.

Old Telugu Pronouns
		Nominative	Oblique
1st person	singular	ēn nēn, nān	nā nan-
1st person	plural	ēm nēm, mēm, manam (in.)	mā (ex.) mana (in.) mam-
2nd person	singular	īw, nīw	nī nin-
2nd person	plural	īr, *nīr, mīr	mī mim-
Reflexive	singular	tān	tan-
Reflexive	plural	tām, tamar, tār	tam-

- The third person is formed by personal & gender markers on demonstratives. eg.: *awanṯu > wāṉḏu (> wāḍu) : 'that man'; *iwanṯu > wīṉḏu (> wīḍu) : 'this man'; a-di : 'that thing' etc.

=== Declension ===
Old Telugu Declension
Case	maganḏu ('man'/'son')	kēy(i) ('hand')	koṭṭaṁbuḷ ('hamlets')
Accusative	maganin	kētin	koṭṭaṁbuḷan
Instrumental	maganicētan maganitōḻan	kētitōḻan	koṭṭaṁbuḷatōḻan koṭṭaṁbuḷacētan
Dative	maganiki(n)	kētiki(n)	koṭṭaṁbuḷaku(n)
Ablative	magani-nuṇḍi magani-nuñci	kēti-nuṇḍi kēti-nuñci	koṭṭaṁbuḷa-nuṇḍi koṭṭaṁbuḷa-nuñci
Genitive	magani	kēti	koṭṭaṁbuḷa
Locative	maganiyandun maganiyoḷan maganiḷōn	kētiyandun kētiyoḷan kētiḷōn	koṭṭaṁbuḷandun koṭṭaṁbuḷan koṭṭaṁbuḷoḷan koṭṭaṁbuḷaḷōn

=== Syntax ===
The structure of Old Telugu sentences typically involved nominative-accusative alignment, with case markers indicating the grammatical roles of nouns. The language employed a variety of case forms and postpositions to express detailed semantic relations.

== Vocabulary ==
=== Native numerals ===
English	Old Telugu	Modern Telugu	Notes
one	ఒన్ఱు oṉḏu ఒక్కొన్ఱు okkoṉḏu	ఒండు oṇḍu ఒకటి okaṭi	ఒండు oṇḍu is rarely used in modern spoken Telugu; its usage remains chiefly literary. However, it still appears in words like oṇṭi, oṇṭari : 'single', 'lonely'. ఒకటి okaṭi is used in its place as a numeral, which is derived from okkoṇṭi, the oblique form of okkoṇḍu.
two	రెణ్డు reṇḍu *రేణ్డు *rēṇḍu *ఎరణ్డు *eraṇḍu	రెండు reṇḍu	orthographical change
three	మూన్ఱు mūṉḏu	మూడు mūḍu	ṉḏ → ḍ
four	నాలుఙ్గు nāluṅgu	నాలుగు nālugu	N → ∅ / V_C
five	ఏను ēnu	ఏను ēnu అయిదు ayidu ఐదు aidu	ఏను ēnu is rarely used in modern spoken Telugu; its usage remains chiefly literary. However, its occurrence is found intact in the numerals padihēnu: 'fifteen' and yābʰay (< ēn-pʰadi): 'fifty'. అయిదు ayidu and ఐదు aidu are used in its place. Both variants come from Proto-Dravidian *caymtu.
six	ఆఱు āṟu	ఆరు āru	ṟ → r
seven	ఏఴు ēḻu	ఏడు ēḍu	ḻ → ḍ
eight	ఎణిమిది eṇimidi ఎణుమ్బొది eṇumbodi	ఎనిమిది enimidi	ṇ → n
nine	తొన్బిది tonbidi తొమ్బిది tombidi	తొమ్మిది tommidi	nb, mm → mm
ten	పది padi -భది -bʰadi -ప్ఫది -ppʰadi -వది -wadi	పది padi -భై -bʰay -ప్ఫై -ppʰay -వై -way	పది padi is the cardinal number The suffixes are the equivalent of English -ty (e.g. sixty, seventy), used for multiples of ten. The reconstructed Proto-Dravidian laryngeal *H (PDr *paHtu) has its reflex being an aspiration as -bʰadi/-ppʰadi; d → ∅ / V_V
twelve	పదిరెణ్డు padireṇḍu పణ్ౚెణ్డు paṇḍṟeṇḍu పన్రెణ్డు panreṇḍu	పన్నెండు panneṇḍu	nr → nn
sixty	అఱవది aṟawadi	అరవై araway	ṟ → r, d → ∅ / V_V
one hundred	నూఱు nūṟu	నూరు nūru వంద vanda	నూరు nūru evolved as a result of the ṟ → r merge. వంద vanda (of unknown origin) is the standard term, and is used natively by the Telangana and Coastal Andhra dialects. However, in most of the dialects nūṟu still appears in the numbers above 100, with its oblique from: nūṭa-iraway-enimidi: 'one hundred and twenty-eight', etc.
one thousand	వేయి wēyi	వేయి wēyi వెయ్యి weyyi	Telugu is the only Dravidian language to have a native word for "thousand" (wēyi), while other literary languages borrowed Indo-Aryan sahasra.

=== Primary colours ===
There are four primary colours in Old Telugu, with the root words being:

- వెళ్-/తెల్- weḷ-/teḷ- : 'white'
- కార్- kār- : 'black'
- కెమ్-/చెమ్- kem-/cem- : 'red'
- పచ్చ్-/పస్- pacc-/pas- : 'green' & 'yellow'.

Both Old Telugu and Proto-Dravidian had absence of roots which distinguish green and yellow, a feature which still exists in modern spoken Telugu.

=== Toponymic Suffixes ===
The historical place-name suffixes of Telugu-speaking regions were as follows:

-ūr, -pūṇḍi, -pāḻu, -pēṭa, -paṭṭanambu, -wāḍa, -kal, -cheraḷa, -maraḷa, -sīma, -gūḍiyam, -guṭṭa, -paḷḷi, -pāḷiyam, -koṉḏa, -vīḍu, -valasa, -pāka, -puḻōl, -wāka, -ili, -kuṇṭa, -paṟṟu, -paṟiti, -villi, -kōna, -nāḍu, -gaḍḍa, -ēṟu, -kuduru, -baṇḍa, -peṇṭa, -varam, -purambu and -nagarambu

== Sample Texts ==
=== Kalamalla Inscription (575 CE) ===
svasti srī erikalmuturāju dhanuñjayuṉḏu rēnāṇḍu ēḷan ciṟuṁbūri rēvaṇakālu paṁ- pu cēnūru kāj(u) aḷikaḷa ūri- ...vāru uḷi-...

=== Indukur & Potladurthi inscriptions (600 CE) ===
svasti srī cōḻa mahārājull ēḷan erigal dugarājul iccina pannasa kocciya pāṟa rēvasarmmārikīni ḻaccina wāṉḏu pañcamahāpataka samyuktuṉḏagu...

...oḷana inpuḻōli aṇapōtulu rēvaṇakālu puddaṇakālu iccina pannasa pen pāṟa iseṟēnikin dīni ḻaccina wāṉḏu pañcamahāpatakuṉḏagun asivairuvu likitam...

=== Addanki Inscription (848 CE) ===
paṭṭambu gaṭṭina prathamambu nēṇḍu balagarvvaṁ boppaṅga bai lēci sēna paṭṭambu gaṭṭiñci prabhu baṇḍa raṅgu bañcina samatta paḍuvatō bōya koṭṭãbulvaṇḍreṇḍu goṇi vēṅgi nāḍin goḷalci (ya) tribhuvanāṅkuśa bāṇa nilpi kaṭṭepu durggaambu gaḍu bayalsēsi kaṇḍukūr bejavāḍa gāviñcemecci...

=== Bezawada inscription of Yuddhamalla (898 CE) ===
...velayaṅga niyyeṭṭu ḻissi malinurai viḍisina vrōla gala tānapatulunu rājupaṭṭambu gaṭṭina patiyu naliyaṁ bayvūrala velvariñcina naśvamēdhambu phalambu pēkṣiñcina liṅgaṁ baḻisina pāpambu damaku...

== See also ==
- Telugu language
- Telugu literature
- Telugu-Kannada script

== Sources ==
- Krishnamurti, B. (2003). The Dravidian Languages. Cambridge University Press. ISBN 0-521-77111-0.
- Ramasubramayam, P. (2019). "Old Telugu". In Stever, Sanford (ed.). The Dravidian Languages (2nd ed.). Routledge. pp. 1–44. ISBN 978-1-138-85376-8.
- Steever, Sanford (2019). "Introduction to the Dravidian languages". In Steever, Sanford (ed.). The Dravidian Languages (2nd ed.). Routledge. pp. 1–44. ISBN 978-1-138-85376-8.
