= Gidugu Venkata Ramamurthy =

Telugu writer

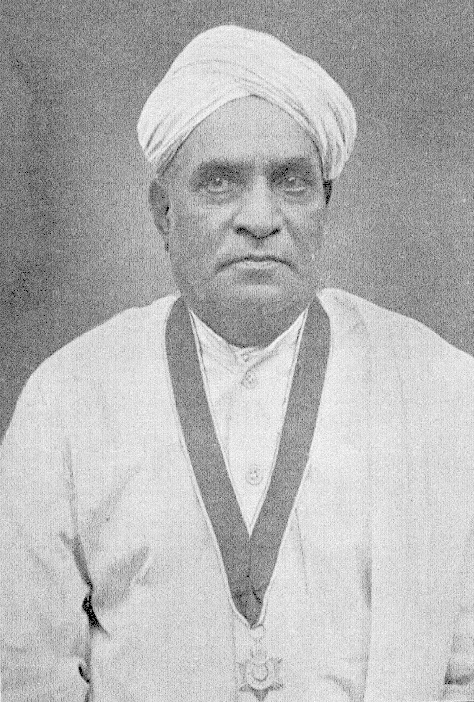
- Born: 29 August 1863; Parvathalapeta, Srimukhalingam, Srikakulam district
- Died: 22 January 1940 (aged 76); Srikakulam
- Other names: Rao sahib, Kalaprapoorna

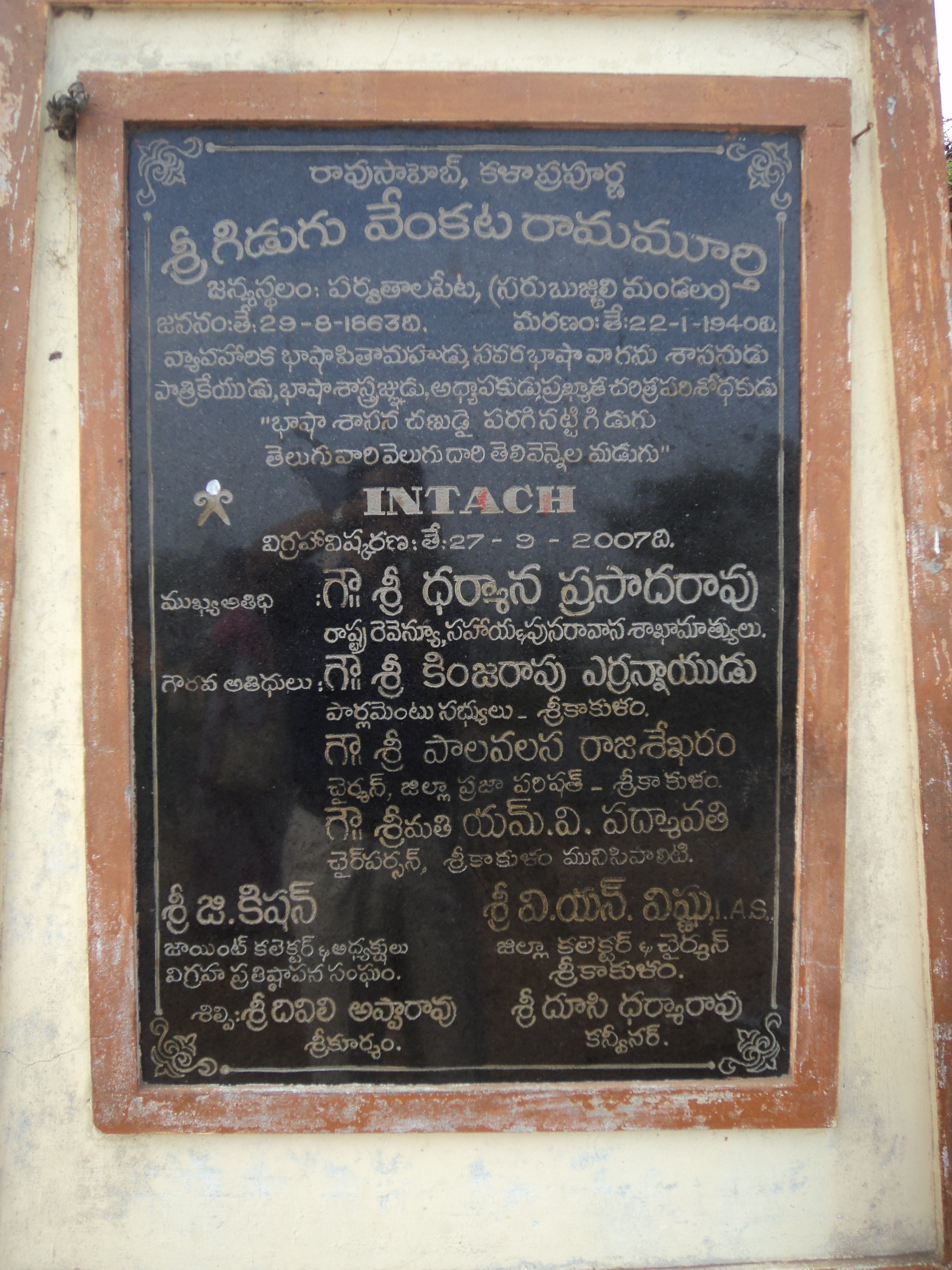
Information plate about Gidugu Ramamurthy below the Statue.

Gidugu Venkata Ramamurthy (1863-1940) was a Telugu writer and one of the earliest modern Telugu linguists and social visionaries during the British rule. He championed the cause of using a language comprehensible to the common man (‘Vyavaharika Bhasha’) as opposed to the scholastic language (‘Grandhika Bhasha’).

== Early life ==
Gidugu Ramamurthy was born at Parvatalapeta, Srikakulam near Vamsadhara River on the border of Orissa, then part of Madras Presidency. His father Veeraraju worked as revenue inspector and died when Ramamurthy was just 12 years old. It was a struggle for him to survive. He studied privately and passed his matriculation, staying in his sister's house and began his life as a teacher in Gajapati Maharaja School, Parlakimidi for 55 years.

Albeit being a historian as well, Ramamurthy was unable to read ‘Sasanas’ on stone tablets clearly. To understand them he studied books that were imported by Vizianagaram Maharaja's son Kumara Raja. He studied various language scripts and after deciphering the ‘Sasanas’ he wrote books on languages and scripts.

Ramamurthy had studied many languages and comprehended the philosophy of language. He pleaded for lucidity in text books. In his time there was only a poetic approach and never was a prosaic treat. He launched a monthly titled Telugu to drive his point.

Gidugu gave a social base to Telugu literature and rendered services to the tribals, especially the Savaras, in Parlakimidi area of Srikakulam agency area and tirelessly worked for the development of tribal languages. He gave Savara language a script and prepared lexicons. During his research for Savara language, he had to travel in the forests resulting in excessive use of quinine due to which he became deaf.

== Fight for ‘Vyavaharika Bhasha’ ==
The language of the sasan (inscriptions), the language loaded with Sanskrit diction of the Kavya, and the language spoken every day, were not the same. For many of the Telugu speakers themselves, kavya bhasha is mostly incomprehensible. The grandhika bhasha ("written language") then taught in schools and colleges did not promote the skills necessary either for understanding or communicating effectively in real life situations.

Gidugu was an eminent language visionary. He recognized the primacy of oracy and the efficacy of the by now accepted 'direct method' of language teaching. For teaching Telugu, he wanted the spoken language to be the medium of instruction. This engulfed him in conflict with the orthodox Sanskrit-educated pundits, which sometimes turned vitriolic. Due to Gidugu's tenacity and commitment, sishta vyavaharika (standard, current, and spoken language) gained currency and acceptance.

To drive home his pedagogic, literary, humanistic, and modernizing thoughts, Gidugu used the press, publications, the public platform, social discourse, and even pamphleteering. Between 1910 and 1914 he went about talking, arguing, convincing, making rapid strides even in the face of stiff opposition. Balakavisaranyam, Gadya Chintamani, Andhra Pandita Bhishakkula Bhasha Bheshajam and Vyasavali are his efforts to convince and plead with his opponents to see reason.

Ramamurthy saw in his own lifetime people seeing his point and rallying round him. Kandukuri Veeresalingam Pantulu founded Vartamana Vyavaaharikandhra Bhasha Parivartaka Samajam and as its president endorsed Gidugu's views.

Andhra Sahitya Parshat, Kakinada, withdrew from the fight in 1924. In 1933, Abhinavandhra Kavi Panditasabha, under the chairmanship of Chilukuri Narayana Rao Pantulu, resolved that modern vyavaharika must be the medium of instruction. In 1936 a journal was started publishing articles in the current cultivated Telugu. In 1937, Tapi Dharma Rao started a periodical in this style. Today, the cultivated current Telugu (J. a. Yates's phrase) is the medium of instruction, of examination, and even thesis writing.

== Works ==
- ‘Kalinga (Orissa) Charitra’
- Developed language script and prepared lexicons for the ‘Savara’ people (Munda tribe)
- Sora-English Dictionary
- Savara Patalu

== Honors ==
- The British Government conferred on him the title of Rao Saheb not for loyalty to the Crown but for his service to the Savaras, to pedagogy and to Telugu.
- The British Government conferred on him the title of "Kaisar-i-Hind Medal" on him in the year of 1933 for his services
- The Telugu Language Day is celebrated on his birthday 29 August.
- Nicknamed as pidugu (a thunderbolt) rhyming with his surname, Gidugu
- European linguisticians like Jules Bloch and Daniel Jones recognized his work on Munda linguistics as pioneering and original.

== Research on Gidugu's Work ==
A number of scholars, linguists, and teachers have discussed Gidugu's work and written about his achievement. Most important among them are

- Telugu Bhasha Charitra edited by Professor Bh. Krishna Murty
- Vyavaharika Bhasha Vikasam by Dr. Boodaraju Radhakrishna
- Maroo Sari Gidugu Ramamoorty edited by Professor C. Rama Rao.
- Late Burra Seshagiri Rao of Bharathi Thirtha fame, David Stampe and J. A. Yates are among many others who recorded their admiration for Gidugu's work.
- Stanley Strarosta, well-known linguist and professor at the University of Hawaii, dedicated his Ph.D. thesis submitted to the University of Wisconsin to Gidugu Venkata Ramamurthy.
- Gidugu Rammurthy Jeevitham Rachanalu ( Gidugu Rammurthy's life story ) by professor Dr. Dasarathula Narsaiah
