= Kandukuri Veeresalingam =

Indian social reformer (1848–1919)

Rao Bahadur Kandukuri Veeresalingam
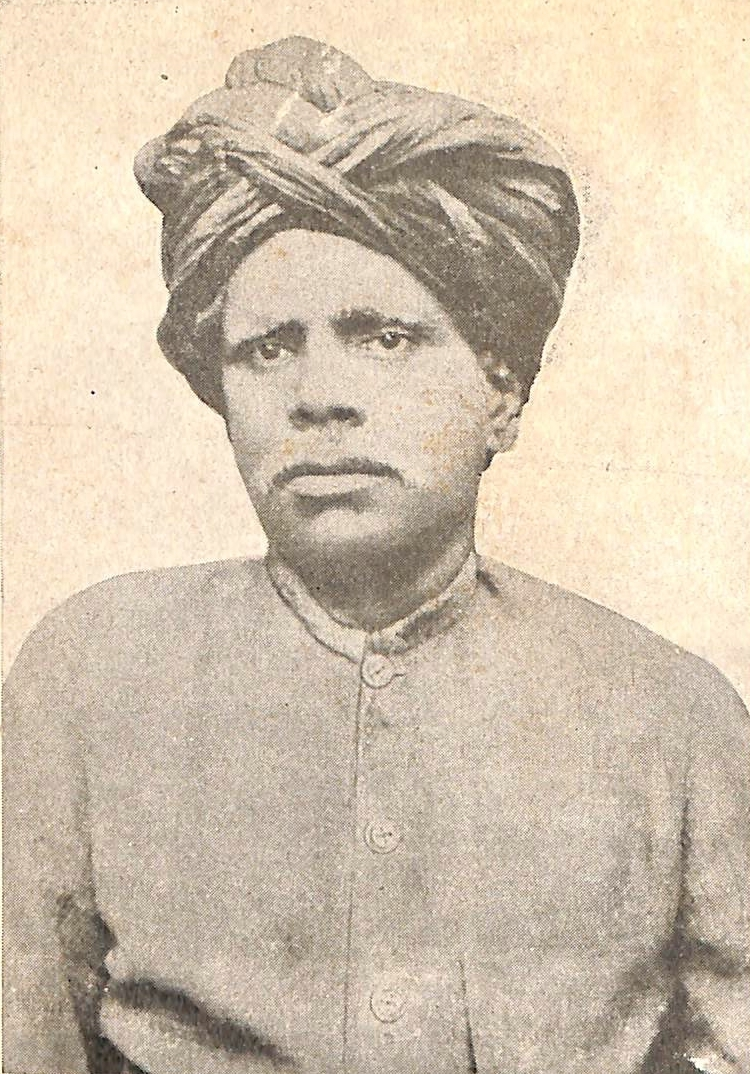
- Kandukuri Veeresalingam Panthulu
- Born: Kandukuri Veeresalingam Panthulu; 16 April 1848; Rajahmundry, Madras Presidency, British India (now in Andhra Pradesh, India)
- Died: 27 May 1919 (aged 71); Madras, British India (now Chennai, Tamil Nadu, India)
- Occupations: Social reformer, Writer
- Spouse: Bapamma Rajyalakshmi (m. 1861)

Kandukuri Veeresalingam (16 April 1848 – 27 May 1919) was a social reformer and writer from the Madras Presidency, British India, current Andhra Pradesh . He was considered as the Father of the Telugu Renaissance movement. He was one of the early social reformers who encouraged the education of women and the remarriage of widows (which was not supported by society during his time). He also fought against child marriage and the dowry system. He started a school in Dowlaiswaram in 1874, constructed the 'Brahmo Mandir' in 1887 and built the 'Hithakarini School' in 1908 in Andhra Pradesh. His novel Rajasekhara Charitramu is considered to be the first novel in Telugu literature.

He is often considered Raja Ram Mohan Roy of Andhra. He was known by the title Gadya Tikkana, or ‘the Tikkana of Prose'.

== Early life ==
Kandukuri Veeresalingam was born into a Telugu-speaking Brahmin family in Rajahmundry, Madras Presidency, to Subbarayudu and Poornamma. When he was six months old, he had smallpox, a dangerous disease during that time, and when aged four his father died. He was adopted by his paternal uncle, Venkataratnam. After studying in an Indian street school, he was sent to English medium school where his talent was recognised. His good nature and studiousness earned him the best student award in his school. He completed his matriculation in 1869 and got his first job as a teacher in Korangi village.

== Literature ==
Veeresalingam was a scholar in Telugu, Sanskrit, and Hindi. Considering literature as an instrument to fight against social evils, his writings also reflected the same. He wrote plays such as Prahlada(1886) and Satya Harischandra (1886). He published a novel Rajasekhara Charitamu in 1880, originally serialised in Viveka Chandrika from 1878. Generally recognised as the first Telugu novel, it is inspired by The Vicar of Wakefield, a novel by the Irish writer Oliver Goldsmith

His works include:

- Rajasekhara Charitramu, first novel in Telugu
- 'Viveka Vardhini', a journal for women education in 1887.
- 'Satihita bodhini', a monthly magazine for women.
- the first drama in Telugu and first book in Telugu on sciences & history.

== Brahmo Samaj ==
Kandukuri Veeresalingam was inspired by the principles of Brahmo Samaj leaders like Raja Rammohan Roy, Pandit Ishwar Chandra Vidyasagar, & Keshab Chandra Sen. He started Andhra Pradesh's first Brahmo Mandir in Rajahmundry in 1887.

== Social reformer ==
=== Supporting Women ===
One of Veeresalingam's greatest reforms had been his promotion of women's education, which was a taboo in those days. In 1876, he started a journal called Viveka Vardhini and published articles about women's issues of that area. The magazine was initially printed in Chennai (then Madras), but with his writings gaining popularity, he established his own press at Rajahmundry.

Widow remarriage was not appreciated in the society during those days, and he opposed this practice by quoting verses from the Hindu Dharma Sastra to prove his point. His opponents used to organise special meetings and debates to counter his arguments, and even resorted to physical violence against him when they failed to stop him. Undeterred, Veeresalingam started a Remarriage Association and sent his students all over Andhra Pradesh to find young single men willing to marry widows. He arranged the first widow remarriage on 11 December 1881. For his reformist activities, Kandukuri gained attention all over the country. The Government, in appreciation of his work, conferred on him the title of Rao Bahadur in 1893. Later he established a home for widows.

As per N. Putali Krishnamurthi, Veeresalingam was probably inspired by the writings of Muddu Narasimham Naidu who pioneered the widow remarriage movement and the rationalist movement in Andhra.

== Politics ==
Kandukuri Veeresalingam was one of the attendees of the first Indian National Congress (INC) meeting in 1885.

== Personal life ==
Kandukuri Veeresalingam was married to Bapamma Rajyalakshmi in 1861. At the time of marriage, he was 14 years old and she was 9.

== Death ==
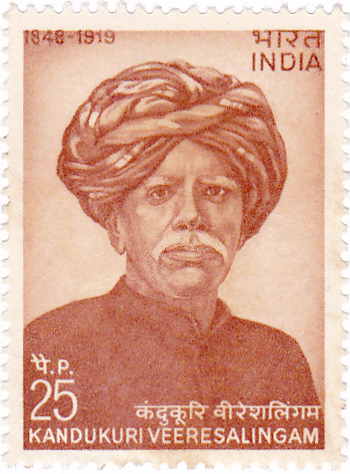
India post department issued a stamp in memory of Veeresalingam

Veeresalingam died on 27 May 1919 at the age of 71. His statue has been unveiled on the Beach Road in Vishakhapatnam. In his memory, the Indian Postal service issued a 25-paisa postage stamp in 1974.
