= World Telugu Conference =

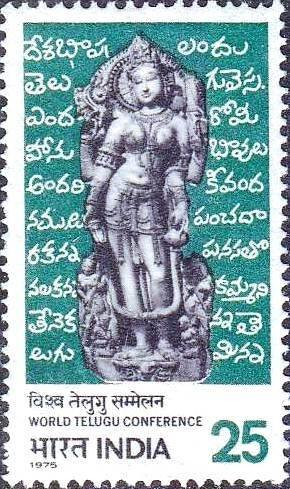
World Telugu Conference, Stamp of India - 1975 - Saraswati (Goddess of learning) - inscription in Telugu.

The World Telugu Conference (WTC) is a conference for the furtherance of the Telugu language. Literary luminaries attend and share their views on spreading and preserving the language and advocating a Telugu language policy.

== History ==
The first WTC was held in Hyderabad in 1975. The then Minister of Education, Mandali Venkata Krishna Rao was instrumental in starting it. The singer M. S. Ramarao made his debut at the conference. It was also attended by Sankarambadi Sundarachari, who penned the anthem "Maa Telugu Thalliki", and the actor-singer Tanguturi Suryakumari who came from London to render the anthem.

The second WTC was held in Kuala Lumpur, Malaysia from 14–18 April 1981, and the third in December 1990 in Mauritius.

The fourth Telugu conference was held in Tirupati in December 2012. The fifth was held from 15 December 2017 at LB Stadium, Hyderabad, celebrating 40 years of World Telugu Conferences.

List of conferences
Official title	Host city	Host country	Year	Ref.
1st World Telugu Conference	Hyderabad	India	1975	
2nd World Telugu Conference	Kuala Lumpur	Malaysia	1981	
3rd World Telugu Conference	Port Louis	Mauritius	1990	
4th World Telugu Conference	Tirupati	India	2012	
5th World Telugu Conference	Hyderabad	India	2017	
6th World Telugu Conference	Rajamahendravaram	India	2024	
