= Telugu language =

Dravidian language

Telugu
- Telugu
- The word "Telugu" in the Telugu script
- Pronunciation: [ˈt̪eluɡu]
- Native to: India
- Region: Andhra Pradesh; Telangana; Puducherry; Tamilnadu; Karnataka
- Ethnicity: Telugus
- Speakers: L1: 83 million (2011 census); L2: 13 million (2011 census)
- Language family: Dravidian: Southern; South-Central; Teluguoid; Telugu
- Early forms: Old Telugu: Middle Telugu
- Standard forms: Standard Telugu (Note: based on Central dialect)
- Dialects: Northern (incl. Telangana) Southern Central Eastern
- Writing system: Telugu; Telugu Braille; Perso-Arabic (used in Hyderabad)
- Signed forms: Signed Telugu

Official status
- Official language in: India; Andhra Pradesh; Telangana; Puducherry (Yanam); West Bengal (additional)
- Recognised minority language in: South Africa (protected language): KwaZulu-Natal Province (optional third language)
- Regulated by: Telugu Academy; Official Language Commission of Government of Andhra Pradesh; Centre of Excellence for Studies in Classical Telugu

Language codes
- ISO 639-1: te
- ISO 639-2: tel
- ISO 639-3: tel – inclusive code Individual code: wbq – Waddar
- Glottolog: telu1262 Telugu oldt1249 Old Telugu
- Linguasphere: 49-DBA-aa
- Geographical distribution of native Telugu speakers. Telugu is majority or plurality. Telugu is a significant minority (25% of the population

Telugu (/ˈtɛlʊɡuː/; తెలుగు, Telugu pronunciation: [ˈt̪eluɡu]) is a Dravidian language native to the Indian states of Andhra Pradesh and Telangana, where it is also the official language. Telugu is a classical language with a recorded history of at least 2,000 years. Spoken by about 100 million people, Telugu is the most widely spoken member of the Dravidian language family, and one of the twenty-two scheduled languages of the Republic of India.

It is one of the few languages that has primary official status in more than one Indian state, alongside Hindi and Bengali. Telugu is one of the languages designated as a classical language by the Government of India. It is the fourteenth most spoken native language in the world.

Telugu is also spoken in the states of Karnataka, Tamil Nadu, Kerala, Maharashtra, Chhattisgarh, Odisha and the union territories of Puducherry and Andaman and Nicobar Islands, although it is not a main language in those states and only a minority speaks them. Further south, it is spoken in Sri Lanka by the Sri Lankan Telugus. It is also spoken by members of the Telugu diaspora spread across countries like the United States, Australia, Malaysia, Mauritius, UAE, Saudi Arabia, and others. Telugu is the fastest-growing language in the United States. It is also a protected language in South Africa and is offered as an optional third language in schools in KwaZulu-Natal province.

According to philologist Mikhail S. Andronov, Telugu split from the Proto-Dravidian language around 1000 BCE, making it the earliest major Dravidian language to break off into a distinct branch. The earliest Telugu words appear in Prakrit inscriptions dating to c. 4th century BCE, found in Bhattiprolu, Andhra Pradesh. Telugu label inscriptions and Prakrit inscriptions containing Telugu words have been dated to the era of Emperor Ashoka (257 BCE), as well as to the Satavahana and Vishnukundina periods.. Earlier Telugu label inscription "tolacuvānḍru," found near Keesaragutta Temple, dates to the Vishnukundina Period (c. 400 CE) and Historians from Telangana claim that the ‘Toluchuvandru’ inscription of Keesaragutta temple in Medchal-Malkajgiri district is about a century older than the Kalamalla inscription, which was inscribed in 575 AD. Inscriptions in the Old Telugu script were found as far away as Indonesia and Myanmar. Telugu has been used as an official language for over 1,500 years. It served as the court language for several dynasties in southern and eastern India, including the Vishnukundina, Telugu Chodas, Eastern Chalukyas, Eastern Gangas, Kakatiyas, Vijayanagara Empire, Qutb Shahis, Madurai Nayaks, and Thanjavur Nayaks. Notably, it was also adopted as an official language outside its homeland, even by non-Telugu dynasties, such as the Thanjavur Marathas in Tamil Nadu.

Telugu has an unbroken, prolific, and diverse literary tradition of over a thousand years. Pavuluri Mallana's Sāra Sangraha Ganitamu (c. 11th century) is the first scientific treatise on mathematics in any Dravidian language. Avadhānaṃ, a literary performance that requires immense memory power and an in-depth knowledge of literature and prosody, originated and was specially cultivated among Telugu poets for over five centuries. Roughly 10,000 pre-colonial inscriptions exist in Telugu.

In the precolonial era, Telugu became the language of high culture throughout South India. Vijaya Ramaswamy compared it to the overwhelming dominance of French as the cultural language of Europe during roughly the same era. Telugu also predominates in the evolution of Carnatic music, one of two main subgenres of Indian classical music and is widely taught in music colleges focusing on Carnatic tradition. Over the centuries, many non-Telugu speakers have praised the natural musicality of Telugu speech, referring to it as a mellifluous and euphonious language.

- Person: Telugu
- People: Teluguvāru
- Language: Telugu
- Country: Telugu Nāḍu

== Etymology ==
Locations of Trilinga Kshetras

Speakers of Telugu refer to it as simply Telugu or Telugoo. Older forms of the name include Teluṅgu and Tenuṅgu. Tenugu is derived from the Proto-Dravidian word *ten ('south') to mean 'the people who lived in the south/southern direction' (relative to Sanskrit- and Prakrit-speaking peoples). The name Telugu, then, is a result of an "n" to "l" alternation established in Telugu.

The popular belief holds that Telugu is derived from Trilinga of Trilinga Kshetras being the land bounded by the three Lingas which is Telugu homeland. P. Chenchiah and Bhujanga Rao note that Atharvana Acharya in the 13th century wrote a grammar of Telugu, calling it the Trilinga Śabdānusāsana (or Trilinga Grammar). However, most scholars note that Atharvana's grammar was titled Atharvana Karikavali. Appa Kavi in the 17th century explicitly wrote that Telugu was derived from Trilinga. Scholar C. P. Brown made a comment that it was a "strange notion" since the predecessors of Appa Kavi had no knowledge of such a derivation.

George Abraham Grierson and other linguists doubt this derivation, holding rather that Telugu was the older term and Trilinga must be the later Sanskritisation of it. If so the derivation itself must have been quite ancient because Triglyphum, Trilingum and Modogalingam are attested in ancient Greek sources, the last of which can be interpreted as a Telugu rendition of "Trilinga".

== History ==
Telugu, as a Dravidian language, descends from Proto-Dravidian, a proto-language. Linguistic reconstruction suggests that Proto-Dravidian was spoken around the fourth millennium BCE. Comparative linguistics confirms that Telugu belongs to the South Dravidian-II (also called South-Central Dravidian) sub-group, which also includes the non-literary languages like Gondi, Kuvi, Koya, Pengo, Konda and Manda.

Proto-Telugu is the reconstructed linguistic ancestor of all the dialects and registers of Telugu. Russian linguist Mikhail S. Andronov, places the split of Telugu at c.1000 BCE.

The linguistic history of Telugu is periodised as follows:

- Pre-historic Telugu (c. 600 BCE–200 BCE)
- Old Telugu (200 BCE–1000 CE)
- Middle Telugu (1000 CE–1600 CE)
- Modern Telugu (1600 CE–present)

=== Linguistics of Pre-historic Telugu (c. 600 BCE – 200 BCE) ===
Pre-historic Telugu is identified with the period around 600 BCE or even earlier. Pre-historic Telugu is considered one of the most conservative languages of the Dravidian family based on its linguistic features.

- Plural Markers: One notable feature is the presence of contrast in plural markers, such as -r, -ḷ and -nkkVḷ (a combination of -nkk and -Vḷ), which was lost in the earliest forms of many other Dravidian languages. Examples include pū-ḷ (flowers), ā-ḷ (cows), distinct from kolan-kuḷ (tanks), and ī-gaḷ (houseflies). By the time of early writings, -kVḷ marker underwent back-stem formation with the root words, losing its status as a distinct plural marker, eg. mrā̃-kulu (< *maran-kVḷ), later getting analyzed as mrā̃ku-lu, creating a root mrā̃ku (> Modern māku). Other examples include goḍugu, ciluka, eluka, īga.
- Nominative Markers: The nominative markers were -nḏu (masc.sg.p1) and -aṁbu (inanimate.sg), which continued to appear in early inscriptions.
- Phonemic Retention: The early language displayed high phonemic retention, with characteristic phonemes like the voiced retroflex approximant (ḻ or /ɻ/) and the voiced alveolar plosive (ḏ or /d/), which evolved into the alveolar trill (ṟ or /r/) in different positions. Both /d/ and /r/ are evidenced as distinct phonemes in early epigraphic records.
- Tenses: Tenses were structured as "past vs non-past," and gender was categorized as "masculine vs non-masculine."
- Demonstratives: Three demonstratives were in use: ā (distant 'that'), ī (proximate 'this'), and ū (intermediate 'yonder'; in Classical Telugu, ulla).
- Pre-palatalized Initials: Pre-palatalized velar initials before i/e/ay are identified in words like kēsiri ("they did"), found in inscriptions up until the 8th century CE; while several forms like kay-konu ("to take"), kay-mōḍpu ("hand folded greetings"), etc. do appear in Literary Telugu.
- Word Endings: Words typically ended in vowels following a stop consonant, though some had consonant endings with sonorants like -y, -r, -m, -n, -l, -ḷ, -ḻ, and -w. Classical Telugu developed an epenthetic -u that vowelized the final consonant, a feature that has been partly retained in Modern Telugu.
- Place Name Suffixes: Archaic place name suffixes include -puḻōl, -ūr, -paḷḷiya, -pāḷiyam, -paṟṟu, -konḏa, -pūṇḍi, -paṭṭaṇa(ṁbu), pāḻu, paṟiti, and pāka(m).
- Apical Displacement: Apical displacement was underway for certain words. This phenomenon is recorded in very few roots in the common South-Central Dravidian stage, which later spread across a significant portion of words independently in the Telugu branch.
- Conjunctive Marker: The conjunctive marker -um had various structural applications.

=== Earliest records ===
One of the earliest Telugu words, nāgabu, found at the Amaravati Stupa, is dated to around 200 BCE. This word was further analyzed by Iravatham Mahadevan in his attempts to decipher the Indus script.

An early Telugu label inscription, "tolacuvānḍru" (తొలచువాండ్రు; transl. rock carvers or quarrymen), is found on one of the rock-cut caves around the Keesaragutta temple, 35 kilometers from Hyderabad. This inscription is dated to the Vishnukundina period of around 200 CE to 400 CE and is the earliest known short Telugu inscription from the Telangana region. "tolacuvānḍru" (తొలచువాండ్రు is regarded as one of the earliest complete and clearly identifiable Telugu word. This distinguishes it from the earlier nāgabu (నాగబు), in which nāga is a Sanskrit-derived lexical element combined with the Telugu suffix -bu

The Ghantasala Brahmin inscription and the pillar inscription of Vijaya Satakarni at Vijayapuri, Nagarjunakonda, and other locations date to the first century CE. Additionally, the Tummalagudem inscription of the Vishnukundinas dates to the 5th century CE. Telugu place names in Prakrit inscriptions are attested from the 2nd century CE onwards.

A number of Telugu words were found in the Sanskrit and Prakrit inscriptions of the Satavahana dynasty, Vishnukundina dynasty, and Andhra Ikshvakus. The coin legends of the Satavahanas, in all areas and all periods, used a Prakrit dialect without exception. Some reverse coin legends are in Telugu and Tamil languages.

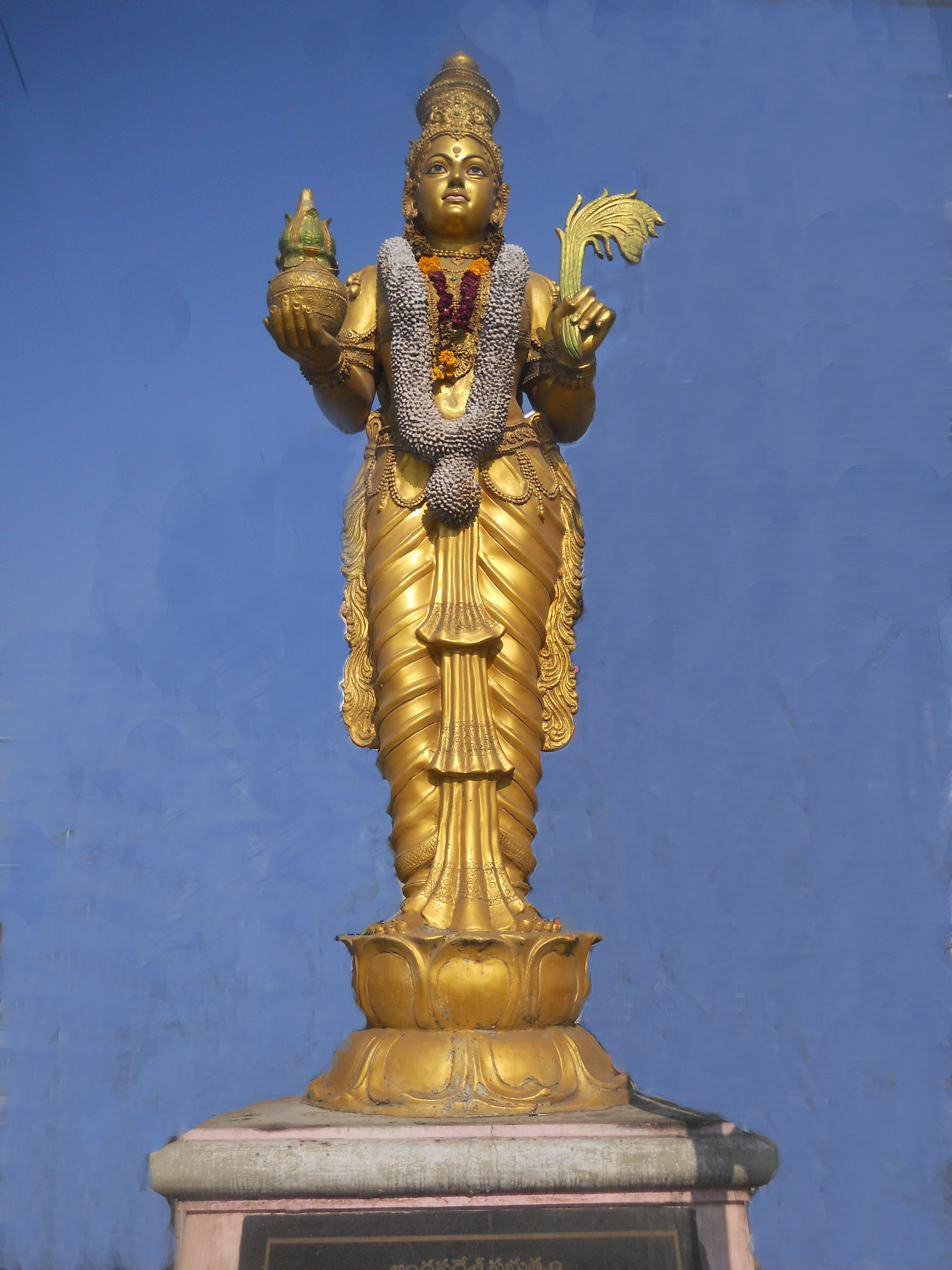
Telugu Talli Bomma (statue of Mother Telugu), the personification of Telugu language in Andhra Pradesh

=== Post-Ikshvaku period ===
The period from the 4th century CE to 1022 CE marks the second phase of Telugu history, following the Andhra Ikshvaku period. The first long inscription entirely in Telugu, dated to 575 CE, is attributed to the Renati Choda king Dhanunjaya and found in the Kadapa district.

Several titles of Mahendravarman I in Telugu language, dated to c. 600 CE, were inscribed on cave-inscriptions in Tamil Nadu.

From the 6th century onwards, complete Telugu inscriptions began to appear in districts neighbouring Kadapa such as Prakasam and Palnadu. Metrically composed Telugu inscriptions and those with ornamental or literary prose appear from 630 CE. The Madras Museum plates of Balliya Choda dated to the mid-ninth century CE, are the earliest copper plate grants in the Telugu language.

During this period, Telugu was heavily influenced by Sanskrit and Prakrit, corresponding to the advent of Telugu literature. Initially, Telugu literature appeared in inscriptions and poetry in the courts of rulers, and later in written works, such as Nannayya's Andhra Mahabharatam (1022 CE).

=== Middle Ages ===
The third phase is marked by further stylisation and sophistication of the literary languages. During this period the split of the Telugu from the Telugu-Kannada alphabet took place.

=== Vijayanagara Empire ===
The Vijayanagara Empire gained dominance from 1336 to the late 17th century, reaching its peak during the rule of Krishnadevaraya in the 16th century, when Telugu literature experienced what is considered its Golden Age. The 15th-century Venetian explorer Niccolò de' Conti, who visited the Vijayanagara Empire, found that the words in the Telugu language end with vowels, just like those in Italian, and hence referred to it as "The Italian of the East"; a saying that has been widely repeated.

=== Delhi Sultanate, Qutb Shahi, and Nizam era ===
A distinct dialectal variant developed in present-day Hyderabad region, due to Persian and Arabic influence. This influence began with the establishment of the Delhi Sultanate rule by the Tughlaq dynasty in the northern Deccan Plateau during the 14th century.

In the latter half of the 17th century, the Mughal Empire extended further south, culminating in the establishment of the Hyderabad State by the dynasty of the Nizam of Hyderabad in 1724. This heralded an era of Persian influence on the Telugu language, especially Hyderabad State. The effect is also evident in the prose of the early 19th century, as in the kaifiyats.

=== Colonial period ===
In the late 19th and the early 20th centuries, the influence of the English language was seen, and modern communication/printing press arose as an effect of British rule, especially in the areas that were part of the Madras Presidency. Literature from this time had a mix of classical and modern traditions and included works by such scholars as Gidugu Venkata Ramamoorty, Kandukuri Veeresalingam, Gurajada Apparao, Gidugu Sitapati and Panuganti Lakshminarasimha Rao.

In the princely Hyderabad State, the Andhra Mahasabha was started in 1921 with the main goal of promoting Telugu language, literature, its books and historical research. Key figures in this movement included Madapati Hanumantha Rao (founder of the Andhra Mahasabha), Komarraju Venkata Lakshmana Rao (founder of the Library Movement in Hyderabad State), and Suravaram Pratapa Reddy.

Since the 1930s, what was considered an "elite" literary form of the Telugu language has now spread to the common people with the introduction of mass media like movies, television, radio and newspapers. This form of the language is also taught in schools and colleges as a standard.

=== Post-independence period ===
Telugu is one of the 22 languages with official status in India. The Andhra Pradesh Official Language Act, 1966, declares Telugu the official language of the state that is currently divided into Andhra Pradesh and Telangana. It also has official language status in the Yanam district of the union territory of Puducherry. It is the fourth most spoken Indian language in India after Hindi, Bengali and Marathi. It is one of the six classical languages of India.

Telugu Language Day is celebrated every year on 29 August, the birthday of Telugu poet Gidugu Venkata Ramamurthy. The fourth World Telugu Conference was organised in Tirupati in the last week of December 2012. Issues related to Telugu language policy were deliberated at length. The American Community Survey has said that data for 2016 which were released in September 2017 showed Telugu is the third most widely spoken Indian language in the US. Hindi tops the list followed by Gujarati, as of the 2010 census.

In the Indian subcontinent, a command over the Telugu language, alongside Sanskrit, Tamil, Meitei, Oriya, Persian, or Arabic, is highly appreciated and respected for learning dances (most significantly Indian Classical Dances) as dancers could have the tools of these languages to go into the primary material texts.

== Geographic distribution ==
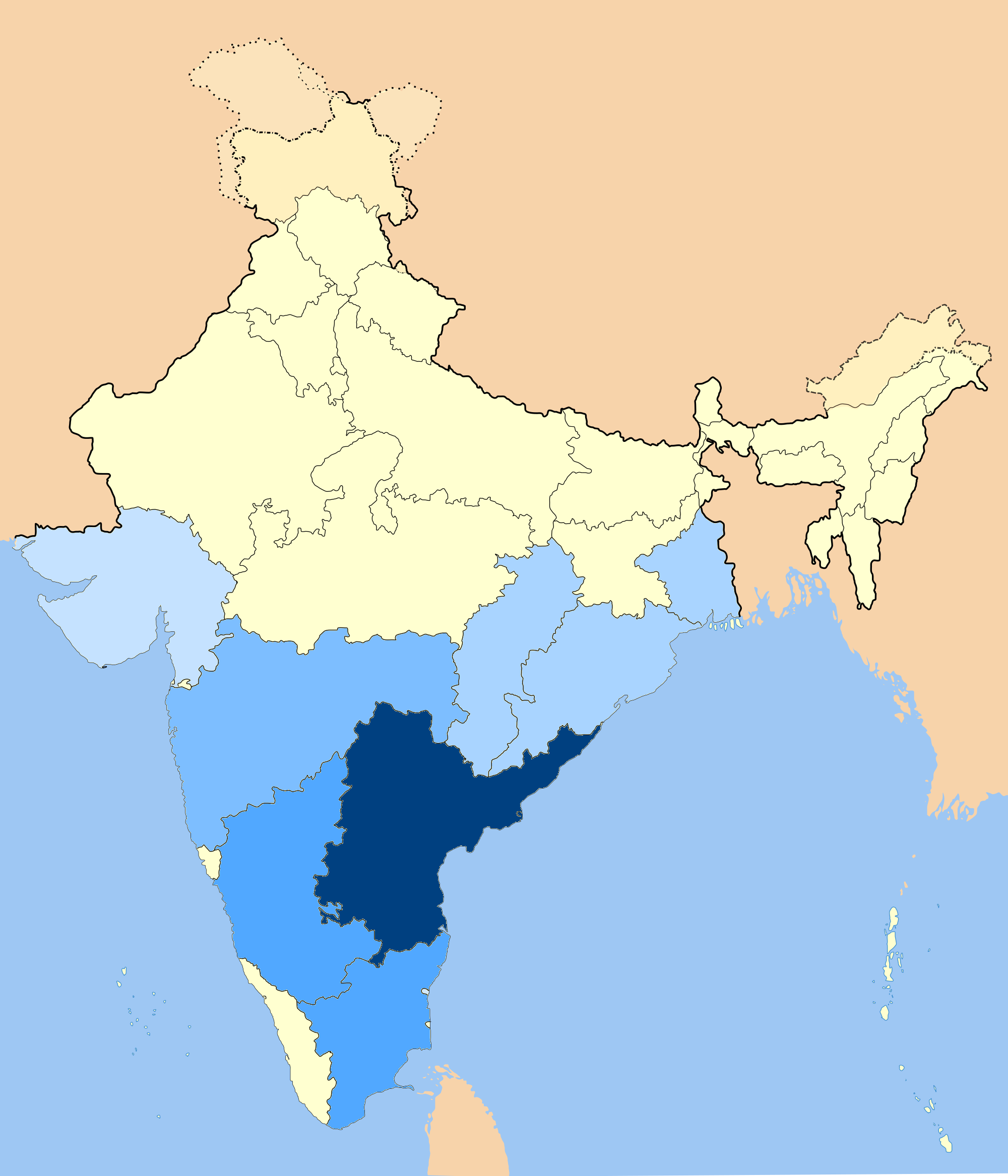
Geographic distribution of Telugu immigrants in light blue; Telugu is native to dark blue.

Telugu is natively spoken in the states of Andhra Pradesh and Telangana and Yanam district of Puducherry. Telugu speakers are also found in the neighbouring states of Tamil Nadu, Karnataka, Maharashtra, Odisha, Chhattisgarh, some parts of Jharkhand, and the Kharagpur region of West Bengal in India. Many Telugu immigrants are also found in the states of Andaman and Nicobar Islands, Gujarat, Goa, Bihar, Kashmir, Uttar Pradesh, Punjab, Haryana, and Rajasthan. As of 2018 7.2% of the population, Telugu is the fourth-most-spoken native language in India after Hindi, Bengali, and Marathi. In Karnataka, 7.0% of the population speak Telugu, and 5.6% in Tamil Nadu.

There are more than 400,000 Telugu Americans in the United States. As of 2018, Telugu is the fastest-growing language in the United States, (especially in New Jersey and New York City), with the number of Telugu speakers in the United States increasing by 86% between 2010 and 2017. As of 2021, it is the 18th most spoken native language in the United States and the third most spoken South Asian language after Hindi and Urdu. Minority Telugus are also found in Australia, New Zealand, Bahrain, Canada, Fiji, Malaysia, Sri Lanka, Singapore, Mauritius, Myanmar, Europe (Italy, the United Kingdom), South Africa, Trinidad and Tobago, and the United Arab Emirates.

== Legal status ==
Telugu is the official language of the Indian states of Andhra Pradesh and Telangana. It is one of the 22 languages under schedule 8 of the constitution of India. It is one of the official languages of the union territories of Puducherry. Telugu is a protected language in South Africa. According to the Constitution of South Africa, the Pan South African Language Board must promote and ensure respect for Telugu along with other languages. The Government of South Africa announced that Telugu will be re-included as an official subject in the South African schools after it was removed from the curriculum in state schools.

In addition, with the creation in October 2004 of a legal status for classical languages by the Government of India on 8 August 2008, Telugu was also given classical language status due to several campaigns.

== Epigraphical records ==
According to the famous Japanese historian Noboru Karashima who served as the president of the Epigraphical Society of India in 1985, there are approximately 10,000 inscriptions which exist in the Telugu language as of the year 1996 making it one of the most densely inscribed languages. Telugu inscriptions are found in all the districts of Andhra Pradesh and Telangana. They are also found in Karnataka, Tamil Nadu, Odisha, and Chhattisgarh. According to recent estimates by ASI (Archaeological Survey of India) the number of inscriptions in the Telugu language goes up to 14,000. Adilabad, Medak, Karimnagar, Nizamabad, Ranga Reddy, Hyderabad, Mahbubnagar, Anantapur, Chittoor and Srikakulam produced only a handful of Telugu inscriptions in the Kakatiya era between 1135 CE and 1324 CE.

== Geographical influence ==
=== Telugu region boundaries ===
Andhra is characterised as having its own mother tongue, and its territory has been equated with the extent of the Telugu language. The equivalence between the Telugu linguistic sphere and the geographical boundaries of Andhra is also brought out in an eleventh-century description of Andhra boundaries. Andhra, according to this text, was bounded in north by Mahendra mountain in the modern Ganjam district in Odisha and to the south by Srikalahasteeswara temple in Tirupati district. However, Andhra extended westwards as far as Srisailam in Nandyal district, about halfway across the modern state. According to other sources in the early sixteenth century, the northern boundary is Simhachalam and the southern limit is Tirumala of the Telugu nation.

=== Telugu Place Names ===
Telugu place names are present all around Andhra Pradesh and Telangana. Common suffixes are -ooru, -pudi, -padu, -peta, -pattanam, -wada, -gallu, -cherla, -seema, -gudem, -palle, -palem, -konda, -veedu, -valasa, -pakam, -paka, -prolu, -wolu, -waka, -ili, -kunta, -parru, -villi, -gadda, -kallu, -eru, -varam,-puram,-pedu and -palli. Examples that use this nomenclature are Nellore, Tadepalligudem, Guntur, Chintalapudi, Yerpedu, Narasaraopeta, Sattenapalle, Visakapatnam, Vizianagaram, Ananthagiri, Vijayawada, Vuyyuru, Macherla, Poranki, Ramagundam, Warangal, Mancherial, Peddapalli, Siddipet, Pithapuram, Banswada, and Miryalaguda.

== Dialects and Teluguoid languages ==
Andhra Pradesh before bifurcation (1956–2014)

There are four regional dialects in Telugu:

- Northern: Telangana
- Southern: Rayalaseema
- Central: Coastal Andhra
- Eastern: North Andhra

Colloquially, Telangana, Rayalaseema and Coastal Andhra dialects are considered the three Telugu dialects and regions.

Standard Telugu is based on the speech of educated speakers of the Central dialect

Waddar, Chenchu, Mukha-Dora, and Manna-Dora are all closely related to Telugu. Other dialects of Telugu are Berad, Dasari, Dommara, Golari, Kamathi, Komtao, Konda-Reddi, Salewari, Vadaga, Vadari Bangalore, and Yanadi.

== Phonology ==
A man speaking Telugu.

The Roman transliteration used for transcribing the Telugu script is the National Library at Kolkata romanisation.

Telugu words generally end in vowels. In Classical Telugu, this was absolute; in the modern language m, n, y, w may end a word. Sanskrit loans have introduced aspirated and murmured consonants in the literary register while their occurrence in colloquial dialects remains minimal.

Telugu does not have contrastive stress, and speakers vary on where they perceive stress. Most place it on the penultimate or final syllable, depending on word and vowel length.

=== Consonants ===
The table below lists the consonant phonemes of Telugu, along with the symbols used in the transliteration of the Telugu script used here (where different from IPA).

Telugu consonants
		Labial	Denti- alveolar		Retroflex	Post-alv./ Palatal	Velar	Glottal
		Labial	plain	sibilant	Retroflex	Post-alv./ Palatal	Velar	Glottal
Nasal		m m	n n		ɳ ṇ			
Plosive/ Affricate	unaspirated	p p	t t	t͡s ts	ʈ ṭ	t͡ʃ c	k k	
Plosive/ Affricate	voiced	b b	d d	d͡z dz	ɖ ḍ	d͡ʒ j	ɡ g	
Plosive/ Affricate	aspirated*	pʰ ph	tʰ th		ʈʰ ṭh	t͡ʃʰ ch	kʰ kh	
Plosive/ Affricate	breathy voiced*	bʱ bh	dʱ dh		ɖʱ ḍh	d͡ʒʱ jh	ɡʱ gh	
Fricative*		f f		s s	ʂ ṣ	ʃ ś		h h
Approximant		ʋ v	l l		ɭ ḷ	j y		
Tap			ɾ r					

- The aspirated and breathy-voiced consonants occur mostly in Sanskrit and Prakrit loanwords, additionally /tʰ/ is used to substitute /θ/ in English loans, the only aspirate which occurs natively is /dʱ/ which occurs only in a few compound numbers e.g. /pɐddʱenimidi/ "18" likely a result of the proto Dravidian laryngeal */H/ there is also an unaspirated /pɐddenimidi/ version which is used more commonly. All of the fricatives except for native /s/ also only occurs in loanwords.
- Perso-Arabic phonemes like /q, x, ɣ, z/ are substituted with /k, kʰ, ɡ, d͡ʒ/ similar to Hindi.
- /t͡s, d͡z/ occur only in native words and lack aspirated/breathy forms. Native words with /t͡ʃ, d͡ʒ/ before non front vowels became /t͡s, d͡z/; this change became phonemised after loaning words with /t͡ʃ, d͡ʒ/ from other languages. Intervocalically /d͡z/ can become [z] e.g. [rɐːzu, d͡zoːli, ɡudd͡zu].
- /ʋ/ can be rounded to a [β̞ʷ] around rounded vowels.
- The common Proto Dravidian approximant */ɻ/ merged with /ɖ/ in Telugu while it was preserved as /ɽ/ in the other Southern II branch languages.
- Many of the old /ɳ/ and /ɭ/ merged with /n/ and /l/.
- Telugu and other languages like Kannada simplified NP, NPP into NB, NP and later on {-V:NC-, -V:C:-}, -VCVC:- into -V:C-, -VCVC-, eg. PD. *poṅku, *ūṅku *āṭu, *āṭṭu, *tōṇṭṭampu, Te. poṅgu, ūgu, āḍu, āṭu, tōṇṭa > tōṭa.
- Middle Kannada RP, RB > Modern Kannada P:, B:, mostly formed from deletion of the second vowel in the syllable form -VCVP- > -VCP- (note that old ḻ became r in clusters), similarly to other nearby languages like Telugu but unlike literary Tamil and Malayalam which largely preserved them, eg. Tamil iruppai, Middle Kannada irpe, Modern Kannada ippe.

Most consonants contrast in length in word-medial position, meaning that there are long (geminated) and short phonetic renderings of the sounds. A few examples of words that contrast by length of word-medial consonants:

- /ɐʈu/ aṭu (that side) – /ɐʈːu/ aṭṭu (pancake)
- /moɡɐ/ moga (male) – /moɡːɐ/ mogga (bud)
- /nɐmɐkɐmu/ namakamu (a vedic hymn) – /nɐmːɐkɐmu/ nammakamu (belief)
- /kɐnu/ kanu (to give birth to) – /kɐnːu/ kannu (eye)
- /kɐlɐ/ kala (dream) – /kɐlːɐ/ kalla (falsehood)
- /mɐɾi/ mari (again) – /mɐɾːi/ marri (banyan tree)

All retroflex consonants occur in intervocalic position and when adjacent to a retroflex consonant, for instance. /ʋɐːɳiː/ vāṇī 'tippet', /kɐʈɳɐm/ kaṭṇam 'dowry', /pɐɳɖu/ paṇḍu 'fruit'; /kɐɭɐ/ kaḷa 'art'. With the exception of /ɳ/ and /ɭ/, all occur word-initial in a few words, such as /ʈɐkːu/ ṭakku 'pretence', /ʈ^{h}iːʋi/ ṭhīvi 'grandeur', /ɖipːɐ/ ḍippā 'half of a spherical object', and /ʂoːku/ ṣōku 'fashionable appearance'.

The approximant /j/ occurs in word-initial position only in borrowed words, such as. /jɐnɡu/ yangu, from English 'young', /jɐʃɐsːu/ yaśassu from Sanskrit yaśas /jɐʃɐs/ 'fame'.

=== Vowels ===
Vowels in Telugu contrast in length; there are short and long versions of all vowels except for /æ/, which only occurs as long. Long vowels can occur in any position within the word, but native Telugu words do not end in a long vowel. Short vowels occur in all positions of a word, with the exception of /o/, which does not occur word-finally. The vowels of Telugu are illustrated below, along with the Telugu script and romanisation.

Telugu vowels
	Front		Central		Back	
Close	i i	iː ī			u u	uː ū
Mid	e e	eː ē			o o	oː ō
Open			a ~ ɐ a	aː ~ ɐː ā		

- An emphatic u maybe added to loans ending with a consonant, eg. school > iskūlu.

==== Allophones ====
In most dialects, the vowel /æː/ only occurs in loan words. In the Guntur dialect, [æː] is a frequent allophone of /aː/ in certain verbs in the past tense.

Telugu has two diphthongs: /ai/ (ఐ) and /au/ (ఔ).

Roots alter according to whether the first vowel is tense or lax. Also, if the second vowel is open (i.e., /aː/ or /a/), then the first vowel is more open and centralised (e.g., [mɛːka] 'goat', as opposed to [meːku] 'nail'). Telugu words also have vowels in inflectional suffixes that are harmonised with the vowels of the preceding syllable.

=== Colloquial speech ===
- In some colloquial speech ṇ, ḷ might completely merge with n, l except in clusters with retroflex plosives.
- In Standard Telugu and most dialects ś is pronounced as s, while Telanganan dialects merge ś to ṣ. eg. iṣṭam, dēśam > istaw̃, dēsaw̃/dēṣaw̃.
- Non initial and particularly final m tends to be [w̃].
- Initial kṣ tend to be kś before front vowels and kṣ/ṭṣ before other in educated speech, ch for uneducated speech; medially tts(h) for all.
- Cluster simplification, eg. viplavam, amlam, raktam, anyāyam > yipalavaw̃, āw̃alaw̃, rattaw̃, annēyaw̃.
- va, vā becomes (w)o, {ā, ō} initially, eg. vāḍu > āḍu/ōḍu. Before front vowels the v becomes y, eg. vennela > yennela.
- Some aspirates might be debuccalized to a h while previous actual h's might be deleted, eg. mukham, mahā > muhaw̃/mugaw̃, mā.
- Telanganan speech tend to have less aspirated consonants.
- Palatalization, eg. madhyāhnam > majjhānaw̃/majjhēnaw̃.
- ph, ts, dz > f, s, j.
- Differences in suffixing, eg. kannu-lu > Coastal kaḷḷu, Rayalseema kaṇḍḷu/kaṇḷu, Telangana kanlu.
- Sri Lankan Telugu too lacks ṇ, ḷ, merges c with s and has vowel alternations like i instead of final -u, perhaps due to Tamil and Sinhalese influence.

== Grammar ==
The traditional study of Telugu Grammar is known as vyākaraṇam (వ్యాకరణం). The first treatise on Telugu grammar, the Āndhra Śabda Cintāmaṇi, was written in Sanskrit by Nannayya, considered the first Telugu poet and translator, in the 12th century CE. This grammar followed patterns described in grammatical treatises such as Aṣṭādhyāyī and Vālmīkivyākaranam, but unlike Pāṇini, Nannayya divided his work into five chapters, covering samjnā, sandhi, ajanta, halanta and kriya.

In the 19th century, Chinnaya Suri wrote a condensed work on Telugu grammar called Bāla Vyākaraṇam, borrowing concepts and ideas from Nannayya's grammar.

=== Morphosyntax ===
Relations between participants in an event are coded in Telugu words through suffixation; there are no prefixes or infixes in the language. There are six word classes in Telugu: nominals (proper nouns, pronouns), verbs (actions or events), modifiers (adjectives, quantifiers, numerals), adverbs (modify the way in which actions or events unfold), and clitics.

Telugu nouns are inflected for number (singular, plural), noun class (three classes traditionally termed masculine, feminine, and neuter) and case (nominative, accusative, genitive, dative, vocative, instrumental, and locative).

==== Word order ====
The basic word order in Telugu is subject-object-verb (SOV).

==== Noun classes (gender) ====
As with other Dravidian languages, gender in Telugu follows a semantic system, in the sense that it is mostly the meaning of the word which defines the noun class to which it belongs. There are three noun classes: masculine (human males or male deities, he-gender), feminine (human females or female deities, she-gender), and neuter (all non-humans including animals and inanimate objects, it-gender). The gender of most nouns is encoded through agreement/indexation in pronominal suffixes rather than overtly on the noun. Noun gender has no influence on the inflection of non-pronoun nouns, but is important to consider for the sake of verbal inflection.

anna vaccāḍu
older.brother come-past-MASC
The older brother came

amma vacc-indi
mother come-past-FEM
Mother came

In terms of the verbal agreement system, genders in marking on the Telugu verb only occur in the third person.

Third person	Singular	Plural
Masculine	tericā-ḍu He opened	tericā-ru They opened
Feminine	tericin-di She opened	tericā-ru They opened
Neuter	tericin-di It opened	tericā-yi/tericina-vi They (non-human) opened

The Telugu gender system differs from other Dravidian languages such as Tamil in that the Telugu feminine shares indexation morphemes with the masculine plural (-ru) and with the neuter singular (-di). What characterises the three-gender system is then the individual behaviour of the singular-plural pairs of suffixes.

Gender	Verbal suffixes (singular : plural)
Masculine	-ḍu : -ru
Feminine	-di : -ru
Neuter	-di : -yi/-vi

=== Pronouns ===
Telugu pronouns include personal pronouns (the persons speaking, the persons spoken to, or the persons or things spoken about); indefinite pronouns; relative pronouns (connecting parts of sentences); and reciprocal or reflexive pronouns (in which the object of a verb is acted on by the verb's subject).

==== Personal pronouns ====
Telugu pronouns
I	నేను, nēnu
we (inclusive)	మనం, manaṃ మనము, manamu
we (exclusive)	మేము, mēmu
you (singular)	నీవు, nīvu నువ్వు, nuvvu
you (plural)	మీరు, mīru
she	ఆమె, āme
he	అతను, atanu
they (humans)	వాళ్ళు, vāḷḷu
it	అది, adi
they (non-humans)	అవి, avi అయి, ayi

In informal Telugu, personal pronouns distinguish masculine from non-masculine.

==== Demonstratives ====
There is a wide variety of demonstrative pronouns in Telugu, whose forms depend on both proximity to the speaker and the level of formality. The formal demonstratives may also be used as formal personal pronoun, that is, the polite forms for this woman or this man and that woman or that man can also simply mean she and he in more formal contexts.

In the singular, there are four levels of formality when speaking about males and females, although the most formal/polite form is the same for both human genders. In both singular and plural, Telugu distinguishes two levels of distance from speaker (like in English), basically this and that, and these and those.

	Singular					
	Proximal (close to speaker, "this")			Distal (far from speaker, "that")		
Gender/Formality	Feminine	Masculine	Neuter	Feminine	Masculine	Neuter
very informal	idi	vīḍu	idi	adi	vāḍu	adi
informal	īme	itanu	idi	āme	atanu	adi
formal	īviḍa	īyana	idi	āviḍa	āyana	adi
very formal	vīru		idi	vāru		adi

In the plural, there are no distinctions between formality levels, but once again masculine and feminine forms are the same, while the neuter demonstratives are different.

Plural
Proximal (close to speaker, "these")			Distal (far from speaker, "those")		
Feminine	Masculine	Neuter	Feminine	Masculine	Neuter
vīỊỊu/vīru		ivi	vāỊỊu/vāru		avi

=== Case system ===
The nominative case (karta), the object of a verb (karma), and the verb are somewhat in a sequence in Telugu sentence construction. "Vibhakti" (case of a noun) and "pratyāyamulu" (an affix to roots and words forming derivatives and inflections) depict the ancient nature and progression of the language. The "Vibhaktis" of Telugu language " డు [ɖu], ము [mu], వు [vu], లు [lu]", etc., are different from those in Sanskrit and have been in use for a long time.

== Lexicon ==
Majority of the lexicon in Telugu is inherited from Proto-Dravidian language, a reconstructed hypothetical language of third millennium BCE. Telugu retained some of the most archaic words, markers and morphemes of the Dravidian origin. It shares its cognates with its closest South-Dravidian-II languages like Gondi, Kuwi and also with other Dravidian languages such as Tamil and Kannada.

The lexicon of Classical Telugu works shows a pervasive influence of Sanskrit; there is also evidence suggesting an earlier influence even before Nannaya. During the period 1000–1100 CE, Nannaya's re-writing of the Mahābhārata in Telugu (మహాభారతము) established the liberal borrowing of Sanskrit words.

Literature in Accatelugu (అచ్చతెలుగు), Mēlimitelugu (మేలిమితెలుగు), or Jānutelugu (జానుతెలుగు) by poets like Adibhatla Narayana Dasu and Ponneganti Telaganna emphasised the importance of native lexicon of Dravidian origin, in contrast to the extensive borrowings from Sanskrit and Prakrit. Spoken Telugu preserved most of its Dravidian lexicon intact in various colloquial dialects.

The vocabulary of Telugu, especially in the city of Hyderabad, has borrowings from Persian and Arabic (through Urdu and directly) languages. These words have been modified to fit Telugu phonology. This was due to Turkic rule in these regions, such as the erstwhile kingdoms of Golkonda and Hyderabad (e.g., కబురు, /kaburu/ for Urdu /xabar/, خبر or జవాబు, /dʒavaːbu/ for Urdu /dʒawɑːb/, جواب).

Many words were borrowed from English language in the modern era and a few from Portuguese during the colonial era. Modern Telugu vocabulary can be said to constitute a diglossia because the formal, standardised version of the language is either lexically Sanskrit or heavily influenced by Sanskrit, as taught in schools, and used by the government and Hindu religious institutions. However, colloquial Telugu is less influenced by Sanskrit and varies depending upon region.

=== Prākr̥ti and vikr̥ti ===
Telugu has many tatsama words, called prākr̥ti. These are direct borrowings from Sanskrit. The equivalent forms of prākr̥ti words, known as vikr̥ti words (or tadbhava words), originate from the same Sanskrit root word, but have evolved through phonological changes in Sanskrit's descendant Prakrit languages, from which they were borrowed into Telugu. The word vikr̥ti means 'distorted' in Sanskrit. In addition to phonological changes, some vikr̥ti words have also undergone semantic shifts, altering their meanings over time. However, prākr̥ti words are generally used in formal settings such as educational institutions and offices. Below is a table of prākr̥ti words and their corresponding vikr̥ti words, with semantic shifts noted:

Prākr̥ti	Vikr̥ti
అగ్ని agni 'fire'	అగ్గి aggi
భోజనం bhōjanaṁ 'food; meal'	బోనం bōnaṁ
విద్య vidya 'education'	విద్దె vidde, విద్దియ viddiya
రాక్షసి rākṣasi 'demoness'	రక్కసి rakkasi
శూన్యం śūnyaṁ 'emptiness, void'	సున్న sunna 'zero'
దృష్టి dr̥ṣṭi 'sight'	దిష్టి diṣṭi 'evil eye'
కనిష్టం kaniśṭaṁ 'minimum'	కనీసం kanīsaṁ 'at least, smallest'
అగరవర్తి agaravarti 'incense'	అగరవత్తి agaravatti
విభూతి vibhūti 'ash'	విభూధి vibhūdhi
చనక canaka 'chickpea'	శనగ śanaga
కవచ kavaca 'protective shell'	గవచ gavaca, గవ్వ gavva
భిక్షం bhikṣaṁ 'alms'	బిచ్చం biccaṁ
ద్వితీయ dvitīya 'second'	విదియ vidiya
తృతీయ tr̥tīya 'third'	తదియ tadiya
జాగ్రత jāgrata 'alert, careful'	జాగ్రత్త jāgratta 'beware, careful'
వామతి vāmati 'vomit'	వాంతి vānti
స్వంత svanta 'own'	సొంత sonta
అటవి aṭavi 'forest'	అడవి aḍavi
త్వర tvara 'fast'	తొర tora
రక్తం raktaṁ 'blood'	రగతం ragataṁ, రత్తం rattaṁ

== Sample text ==
The given sample text is Article 1 from the United Nations Universal Declaration of Human Rights.

=== English ===
All human beings are born free and equal in dignity and rights. They are endowed with reason and conscience and should act towards one another in a spirit of brotherhood.

=== Telugu ===
ప్రతిపత్తిస్వత్వముల విషయమున మానవులెల్లరును జన్మతః స్వతంత్రులును సమానులును నగుదురు. వారు వివేచన-అంతఃకరణ సంపన్నులగుటచే పరస్పరము భ్రాతృభావముతో వర్తింపవలయును.

=== Romanisation (ISO 15919) ===
Pratipattisvatvamula viṣayamuna mānavulellarunu janmataḥ svatantrulunu samānulunu naguduru. Vāru vivēcana-antaḥkaraṇa sampannulaguṭacē parasparamu bhrātr̥bhāvamutō vartimpavalayunu.

=== IPA ===
/pɾɐt̪ipɐt̪t̪isʋɐt̪ʋɐmulɐ viʂɐjɐmun̪ɐ maːn̪ɐʋulellaɾun̪u d͡ʒɐn̪mɐt̪ɐhɐ sʋɐt̪ɐn̪t̪ɾulun̪u sɐmaːn̪ulun̪u n̪ɐɡud̪uɾu ǁ ʋaːɾu ʋiʋeːt͡ʃɐn̪ɐ ɐn̪t̪ɐkkɐɾɐɳɐ sɐmpɐn̪n̪ulɐɡuʈɐt͡ʃeː pɐɾɐspɐɾɐmu bʱɾaːt̪ɾubʱaːʋɐmut̪oː ʋɐɾt̪impɐʋɐlɐjun̪u ǁ/

== Writing system ==
Consonants – హల్లులు, hallulu
క ka IPA: /ka/	ఖ kha IPA: /kʰa/	గ ga IPA: /ɡa/	ఘ gha IPA: /ɡʱa/	ఙ ṅa IPA: /ŋa/
చ ca IPA: /t͡ʃa/	ఛ cha IPA: /t͡ʃʰa/	జ ja IPA: /d͡ʒa/	ఝ jha IPA: /d͡ʒʱa/	ఞ ña IPA: /ɲa/
ట ṭa IPA: /ʈa/	ఠ ṭha IPA: /ʈʰa/	డ ḍa IPA: /ɖa/	ఢ ḍha IPA: /ɖʱa/	ణ ṇa IPA: /ɳa/
త ta IPA: /t̪a/	థ tha IPA: /t̪ʰa/	ద da IPA: /d̪a/	ధ dha IPA: /d̪ʱa/	న na IPA: /n̪a/
ప pa IPA: /pa/	ఫ pha IPA: /pʰa/	బ ba IPA: /ba/	భ bha IPA: /bʱa/	మ ma IPA: /ma/
య ya IPA: /ja/	ర ra IPA: /ɾa/	ల la IPA: /la/	వ va IPA: /ʋa/	ళ ḷa IPA: /ɭa/
శ śa IPA: /ʃa/	ష ṣa IPA: /ʂa/	స sa IPA: /sa/	హ ha IPA: /ha/	ఱ ṟa IPA: /ra/

Telugu script is an abugida comprising 60 symbols – 16 vowels, 3 vowel modifiers, and 41 consonants. Telugu has a complete set of letters that follow a system to express sounds. The script is derived from the Brahmi script like those of many other Indian languages. Telugu script is written from left to right and comprises sequences of both simple and complex characters. It is syllabic in nature – the basic units of writing are syllables. Inasmuch as the number of possible syllables is very large, syllables are composed of more basic units such as vowels ("acchu" or "swaram") and consonants ("hallu" or "vyanjanam"). Consonants in consonant clusters take shapes that are very different from the shapes they take elsewhere. Consonants are presumed pure consonants, that is, without any vowel sound in them. However, it is traditional to write and read consonants with an implied "a" vowel sound. When consonants combine with other vowel signs, the vowel part is indicated orthographically using signs known as vowel "mātras". The shapes of vowel "mātras" are also very different from the shapes of the corresponding vowels.

Historically, a sentence used to end with either a single bar। ("pūrna virāmam") or a double bar॥ ("dīrgha virāmam"); in handwriting, Telugu words were not separated by spaces. However, in modern times, English punctuation (commas, semicolon, etc.) has virtually replaced the old method of punctuation.

Telugu has full-zero ("anusvāra" or "sunna" ) ( ం ), half-zero ("arthanusvāra" or "candrabindu" or "ara-sunna" ) (ఁ) and visarga ( ః ) to convey various shades of nasal sounds. [la] and [La], [ra] and [Ra] are differentiated.

Telugu has ĉ [t͡s] and ĵ [d͡z], which are not represented in Sanskrit.

Wall painting at a shop in India. It first shows the painted party symbols of all the major political parties in the region during the nationwide elections in India in 2014. It also has a Telugu inscription showing availability of political flags, banners, caps, badges and other election material.

=== Telugu Guṇintālu (తెలుగు గుణింతాలు) ===
These are some examples of combining a consonant with different vowels.
క కా కి కీ కు కూ కృ కౄ కె కే కై కొ కో కౌ క్ కం కః
ఖ ఖా ఖి ఖీ ఖు ఖూ ఖృ ఖౄ ఖె ఖే ఖై ఖొ ఖో ఖౌ ఖ్ ఖం ఖః

=== Number system ===
Telugu has ten digits employed with the Hindu–Arabic numeral system. However, in modern usage, the Arabic numerals have replaced them.

Telugu numerals
0 sunna ౦	1 okaṭi ౧	2 renḍu ౨	3 mūḍu ౩	4 nālugu ౪	5 aidu ౫	6 āru ౬	7 ēḍu ౭	8 enimidi ౮	9 tommidi ౯

Telugu is assigned Unicode codepoints: 0C00-0C7F (3072–3199).

Telugu^{[1]}^{[2]} Official Unicode Consortium code chart (PDF)
	0	1	2	3	4	5	6	7	8	9	A	B	C	D	E	F
U+0C0x	ఀ	ఁ	ం	ః	ఄ	అ	ఆ	ఇ	ఈ	ఉ	ఊ	ఋ	ఌ		ఎ	ఏ
U+0C1x	ఐ		ఒ	ఓ	ఔ	క	ఖ	గ	ఘ	ఙ	చ	ఛ	జ	ఝ	ఞ	ట
U+0C2x	ఠ	డ	ఢ	ణ	త	థ	ద	ధ	న		ప	ఫ	బ	భ	మ	య
U+0C3x	ర	ఱ	ల	ళ	ఴ	వ	శ	ష	స	హ			఼	ఽ	ా	ి
U+0C4x	ీ	ు	ూ	ృ	ౄ		ె	ే	ై		ొ	ో	ౌ	్		
U+0C5x						ౕ	ౖ		ౘ	ౙ	ౚ		౜	ౝ		
U+0C6x	ౠ	ౡ	ౢ	ౣ			౦	౧	౨	౩	౪	౫	౬	౭	౮	౯
U+0C7x								౷	౸	౹	౺	౻	౼	౽	౾	౿
Notes 1.As of Unicode version 18.0 2.Grey areas indicate non-assigned code points

== Literature ==
=== Ancient Telugu Writings Period (300 BC – 500 CE) ===
==== Amaravati Stupa ====
Amarāvati Stupa is a ruined Buddhist stūpa at the village of Amaravathi, Palnadu district, Andhra Pradesh, India, probably built in phases between the third century BCE and about 250 CE. The word "nagabu" was one of the first Telugu words that was written on the Amaravati Stupa.

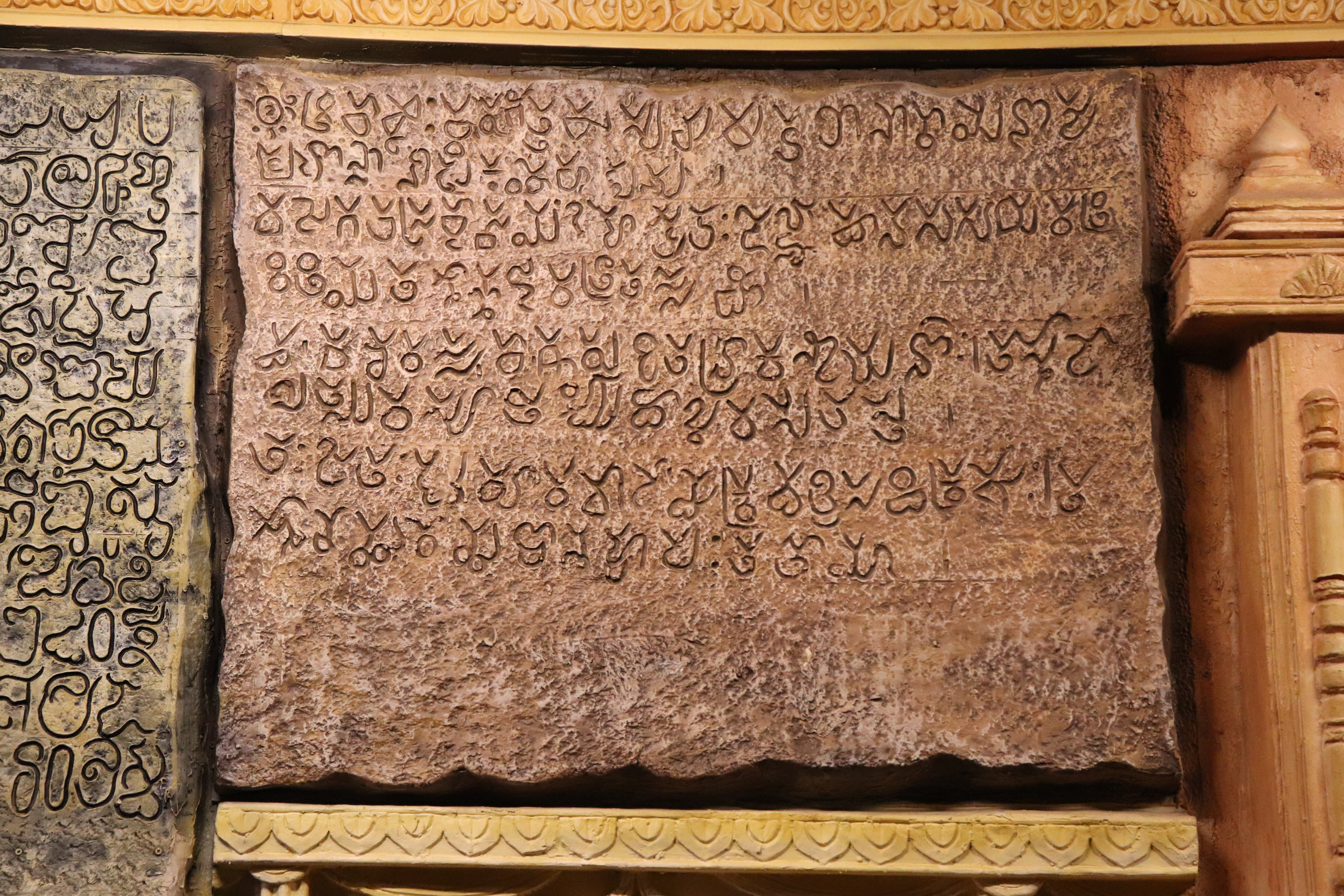
Ancient Telugu Writing displayed at Telugu Museum

=== Early Medieval Telugu Writings Period (500 – 850 CE) ===
These writings were mostly written by the Vishnukudinas, Telugu Chodas, and the Chalukyas.

==== Kallamalla Writing (575 CE) ====
This is the first writing entirely written in Telugu. It was written by Renati Choda king Dhanunjaya. in 575 CE. It was found on the premises of Chennakesava-Siddeshwara temple at Kalamalla village in Yerraguntla Mandal of the district.

==== Indravarma Sasanam ====
This was a writing written by Indra Varma in the 6th century. Indra Varma was a Vishnukudina king in the 6th century.

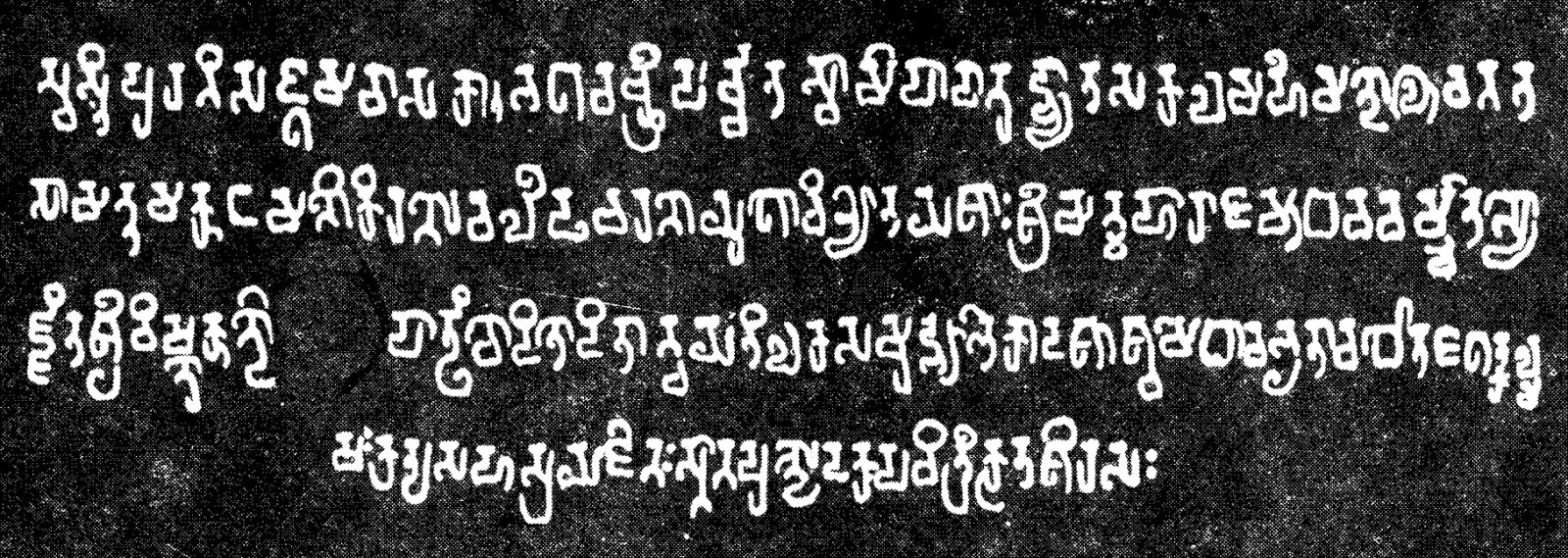
Old Telugu Script – Vishnukundina Indra Varma Sasanam 6th century

==== Janashrayi-Chhandovichiti ====
The 6th- or 7th-century Sanskrit text Janashrayi-Chhandovichiti (or Janāśraya-chandas) deals with the metres used in Telugu, including some metres that are not found in Sanskrit prosody. This indicates that Telugu poetry existed during or around the 6th century.

==== Vipparla and Lakshmipuram Writings ====
Vipparla Inscription of Jayasimha I and the Lakshmipuram inscription of the Mangi yuvaraja were the earliest Telugu inscriptions of Eastern chalukyas found in the 7th century AD.

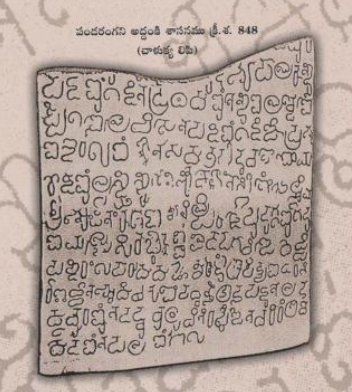

==== Addanki Poem ====
Addanki inscription also known as the Pandaranga inscription belongs to 848AD, excavated near the Thousand Pillar Temple of Addanki. It is testimony to a flourishing Telugu literature much before the available literary texts. Locals believe that this is the first poem ever to be written in Telugu, also called the first Padya Sasanam(Poetic inscription) with (dvipada, with Yati and Prasa; style taruvoja)Staying with the Boya campaign, Pandaranga got victories in all military campaigns of his master Gunaga Vijayaditya III. The inscription spoke about the donation of land by the king to him for his successful military exploits.

=== Telugu Jain Literature Period (850-1020 CE) ===
==== Malliya Rechana ====
Malliya Rechana composed the first Telugu poetic prosody book Kavijanasrayam (pre-Nannayya chandassu). This was a popular one and referred by many poets. There seems to be even an earlier prosody book by Rechana's guru Vaadindra Chudamani which is not available.

Veturi Prabhakara Sastry in 1900s mentioned the existence of Pre-Nannayya Chandassu in Raja Raja Narendra Pattabhisheka Sanchika. Accurate dating of this piece of literature happened after the 1980s discoveries in Karimnagar. Rechana's work is variously dated from 940 CE to 12th and 13th century. Most scholars date him to post-Nannaya period.

=== The Pre-Nannaya Period (before 1020 CE) ===
In the earliest period Telugu literature existed in the form of inscriptions, precisely from 575 CE onward. Metrically composed Telugu inscriptions and those with ornamental or literary prose appear from 630 CE. Most scholars posit that Telugu literature existed prior to Nannaya (11th century), the first known Telugu poet. T. Vijay Kumar notes, "Since no literary texts in Telugu pre-dating 1020 C.E. have so far actually been discovered, the existence of any pre-Nannaya literature remains a matter of speculation and debate."

=== The Age of the Puranas (1020–1400 CE) ===
This is the period of Kavitrayam or Trinity of Poets. Nannayya, Tikkana, and Yerrapragada (or Errana) are known as the Kavitrayam.

Nannaya's (Telugu: నన్నయ) Andhra Mahabharatam written in early 11th century is commonly referred to as the first Telugu literary composition (Aadi Kavyam). Although there is evidence of Telugu literature before Nannaya, he is given the epithet Aadi Kavi ("the first poet"). Nannaya Bhattu acknowledged the help extended to him by his friend Narayana Bhattu in his composition in fields like making choices of grammatical forms, metres, form of the book, etc. and compares it to that extended to Arjuna by God Sri Krishna in the Bharata war. Nannaya was the first to establish a formal grammar of written Telugu. This grammar followed the patterns which existed in grammatical treatises like Aṣṭādhyāyī and Vālmīkivyākaranam but unlike Pāṇini, Nannayya divided his work into five chapters, covering samjnā, sandhi, ajanta, halanta and kriya.[14] Nannaya completed the first two chapters and a part of the third chapter of the Mahabharata epic, which is rendered in the Champu style.

Tikkana Somayaji (1205–1288 CE): Nannaya's Andhra Mahabharatam was almost completed by Tikanna Somayaji (Telugu: తిక్కన సోమయాజి) (1205–1288) who wrote chapters 4 to 18.

Yerrapragada: (Telugu: ఎర్రాప్రగడ) who lived in the 14th century, finished the epic by completing the third chapter. He mimics Nannaya's style in the beginning, slowly changes tempo and finishes the chapter in the writing style of Tikkana. These three writers – Nannaya, Tikanna and Yerrapragada – are known as the Kavitraya ("three great poets") of Telugu. Other such translations like Marana's Markandeya Puranam, Ketana's Dasakumara Charita, Yerrapragada's Harivamsam followed. Many scientific works, like Ganitasarasangrahamu by Pavuluri Mallana and Prakirnaganitamu by Eluganti Peddana, were written in the 12th century.

Sumati Satakam, which is a neeti ("moral"), is one of the most famous Telugu Satakams. Satakam is composed of more than a 100 padyalu (poems). According to many literary critics Sumati Satakam was composed by Baddena Bhupaludu (Telugu: బద్దెన భూపాల) (CE 1220–1280). He was also known as Bhadra Bhupala. He was a Chola prince and a vassal under the Kakatiya empress Rani Rudrama Devi, and a pupil of Tikkana. If we assume that the Sumati Satakam was indeed written by Baddena, it would rank as one of the earliest Satakams in Telugu along with the Vrushadhipa Satakam of Palkuriki Somanatha and the Sarveswara Satakam of Yathavakkula Annamayya. The Sumatee Satakam is also one of the earliest Telugu works to be translated into a European language, as C. P. Brown rendered it in English in the 1840s.

Palkuriki Somanatha: Important among his Telugu language writings are the Basava Purana, Panditaradhya charitra, Malamadevipuranamu and Somanatha Stava–in dwipada metre ("couplets"); Anubhavasara, Chennamallu Sisamalu, Vrushadhipa Sataka and Cheturvedasara–in verses; Basavodharana in verses and ragale metre (rhymed couplets in blank verse); and the Basavaragada.

Gona Budda Reddy: His Ranganatha Ramayanam was a pioneering work in the Telugu language on the theme of the Ramayana epic. Most scholars believe he wrote it between 1300 and 1310 A.D., possibly with help from his family. The work has become part of cultural life in Andhra Pradesh and is used in puppet shows.

In the Telugu literature Tikkana was given agraasana (top position) by many famous critics.

Paravastu Chinnayya Soori (1807–1861) is a well-known Telugu writer who dedicated his entire life to the progress and promotion of Telugu language and literature. Sri Chinnayasoori wrote the Bala Vyakaranam in a new style after doing extensive research on Telugu grammar. Other well-known writings by Chinnayasoori are Neethichandrika, Sootandhra Vyaakaranamu, Andhra Dhatumoola, and Neeti Sangrahamu.

Kandukuri Veeresalingam (1848–1919) is generally considered the father of modern Telugu literature. His novel Rajasekhara Charitamu was inspired by the Vicar of Wakefield. His work marked the beginning of a dynamic of socially conscious Telugu literature and its transition to the modern period, which is also part of the wider literary renaissance that took place in Indian culture during this period. Other prominent literary figures from this period are Gurajada Appa Rao, Viswanatha Satyanarayana, Gurram Jashuva, Rayaprolu Subba Rao, Devulapalli Krishnasastri and Srirangam Srinivasa Rao, popularly known as Mahakavi Sri Sri. Sri Sri was instrumental in popularising free verse in spoken Telugu (vaaduka bhasha), as opposed to the pure form of written Telugu used by several poets in his time. Devulapalli Krishnasastri is often referred to as the Shelley of Telugu literature because of his pioneering works in Telugu Romantic poetry.

Viswanatha Satyanarayana won India's national literary honour, the Jnanpith Award for his magnum opus Ramayana Kalpavrukshamu. C. Narayana Reddy won the Jnanpith Award in 1988 for his poetic work, Viswambara. Ravuri Bharadhwaja won the third Jnanpith Award for Telugu literature in 2013 for Paakudu Raallu, a graphic account of life behind the screen in film industry. Kanyasulkam, the first social play in Telugu by Gurajada Appa Rao, was followed by the progressive movement, the free verse movement and the Digambara style of Telugu verse. Other modern Telugu novelists include Unnava Lakshminarayana (Maalapalli), Bulusu Venkateswarulu (Bharatiya Tatva Sastram), Kodavatiganti Kutumba Rao and Buchi Babu.

== Media ==
=== Telugu support on digital devices ===
Telugu input, display, and support were initially provided on the Microsoft Windows platform. Subsequently, various browsers, computer applications, operating systems, and user interfaces were localised in Telugu language for Windows and Linux platforms by vendors and free and open-source software volunteers. Telugu-capable smart phones were also introduced by vendors in 2013.

== See also ==
- Telugu grammar
- Telugu people
- Telugu states
- Telugu years
- List of languages by number of native speakers in India
- List of Telugu-language newspapers
- List of Telugu-language television channels
- States of India by Telugu speakers
- Telugu language policy

== Bibliography ==
- Albert Henry Arden, A Progressive Grammar of the Telugu Language (1873).
- Charles Philip Brown, English–Telugu dictionary (1852; revised ed. 1903);
- The Linguistic Legacy of Indo-Guyanese The Linguistic Legacy of Indian-Guyanese Archived 13 October 2022 at the Wayback Machine
- Languages of Mauritius Languages of Mauritius – Mauritius Attractions Archived 24 March 2017 at the Wayback Machine
- Charles Philip Brown, A Grammar of the Telugu Language (1857)
- P. Percival, Telugu–English dictionary: with the Telugu words printed in the Roman as well as in the Telugu Character (1862, Internet Archive edition)
- Gwynn, J. P. L. (John Peter Lucius). A Telugu–English Dictionary Delhi; New York: Oxford University Press (1991; online edition Archived 26 February 2021 at the Wayback Machine).
- Uwe Gustafsson, An Adiwasi Oriya–Telugu–English dictionary, Central Institute of Indian Languages Dictionary Series, 6. Mysore: Central Institute of Indian Language (1989).
- Rao, Velcheru Narayana; Shulman, David (2002), Classical Telugu Poetry: An Anthology, University of California Press, archived from the original on 5 September 2022
- Callā Rādhākr̥ṣṇaśarma, Landmarks in Telugu Literature: A Short Survey of Telugu Literature (1975).
- Sinopoli, Carla M. (2001). "On the edge of empire: form and substance in the Satavahana dynasty". Empires: Perspectives from Archaeology and History. Cambridge University Press. ISBN 978-0-521-77020-0.
- Wilkinson, Robert W. (1974). "Tense/lax vowel harmony in Telugu: The influence of derived contrast on rule application". Linguistic Inquiry. 5 (2): 251–270.
- Zvelebil, Kamil (1990), Dravidian Linguistics: An Introduction, Pondicherry Institute of Linguistics and Culture, ISBN 978-81-8545-201-2
