= List of Telugu-language writers =

This is a list of notable Telugu language writers.

== A - D ==
- Aarudra
- Adivi Bapiraju
- Ajjada Adibhatla Narayana Dasu
- Anjaneyulu Kundurti
- Annamacharya
- Gurajada Apparao
- Asavadi Prakasarao
- Balagangadhara Tilak Devarakonda
- Bhandaru Acchamamba
- Bhargavi Rao
- Bharago
- Bulusu Appana Sastry
- Bulusu Somayajulu
- Bulusu Surya Prakasa Sastry
- Bulusu Venkata Kavi
- Bulusu Venkateswarlu
- C. Narayana Reddy
- Chandrabose (lyricist)
- Charles Philip Brown
- Chinnayasuri Paravastu
- Daasarathi Krishnamacharyulu
- Devulapalli Krishnasastri

== E - K ==
- Dwivedula Visalakshi
- Duggirala Gopalakrishnayya
- Gudipati Venkata Chalam
- Tenneti Hemalata
- Tikkana
- Gurram Jashuva
- Jakkana
- Janardhana Maharshi
- Kavana Sarma
- Keshava Reddy
- Kesava Rao Desetty
- Kethu Viswanatha Reddy
- Krishnamacharyulu Dasaradhi
- Kodavatiganti Kutumbarao
- K.Varalakshmi
- Garikapati Narasimha Rao
- Kaloji Narayana Rao
- Kolluru Avatara Sarma

== L - N ==
- Madhunapantula Satyanarayana Sastry
- Malladi Venkata Krishna Murthy
- Makhdoom Mohiuddin
- Molla
- Nannayya
- Vemana
- Muddupalani
- Nayani Krishnakumari
- Namini Subrahmanyam Naidu

== O - R ==
- Paturi Sita Ramanjaneyulu
- Papineni Sivasankar
- Perala Bharata Sarma
- Potturi Vijayalakshmi
- Potana Bammera
- P. Lalita Kumari (Volga)
- Perugu Ramakrishna
- Puranam Subrahmanya Sarma
- Panuganti (Bullet)
- Rajaram Madhurantakam
- Tanikella Bharani
- Ramaswamy Tripuraneni
- Ramireddy Duvvuru
- Ranganayakamma Muppala
- Samudrala Jr.
- Samudrala Sr.
- singireddy Narayana reddy
- Sirivennela Seetharama Sastry
- Seethadevi Vasireddy
- Somayajulu Chaganti
- Srirangam Srinivasa Rao
- Srinathudu
- Subbanna Madhira Deekshitulu
- Suravaram Pratapareddy
- Tripuraneni Gopichand
- Tripuraneni Ramaswamy
- Tripuraneni Maharadhi
- Umar Alisha
- Kavisekhara Dr Umar Alisha
- Varalakshmamma, Kanuparti
- Kandukuri Veeresalingam
- Venkata Rao Kavikondala
- Venkateswara Rao Narla
- Veturi
- Viswanatha Satyanarayana
- Vempalli Shariff
- Yaddanapudi Sulochana Rani
- Yandamuri Veerendranath
