= Abburu =

Abburu may refer to many villages in India:

== Places ==
=== Andhra Pradesh ===
- Abburu, Andhra Pradesh in Sattenapalle

=== Karnataka ===
- Abbur Machagowdanahalli
- Abburu, Hunsur taluk
- Abburu, Krishnarajanagara taluk
- Abbur, Bangalore Rural
- Abbur, Piriyapatna taluk

== People ==
- Abburi Chayadevi
- Abburi Ravi
