= Abburi Ramakrishna Rao =

- Born: May 20, 1896; Anantavaram, Tenali Taluk, Guntur Dist., Andhra Pradesh
- Died: April 30, 1979 (aged 82); Delhi
- Occupations: Telugu Scholar, Librarian; Library Professor
- Spouse: Abburi Rukmini
- Children: 4 Sons, 3 Daughters
- Parents: Lakshmi Narasimha Sastri (father); Bapamma (mother)
- Awards: Kalaprapurna

Abburi Ramakrishna Rao was an Indian writer of the Telugu language, scholar, novelist, playwright, literary critic, humanist, and professor of Library Science. Gurajada Apparao, Rayaprolu Subbarao, and Abburi Ramakrishna Rao were considered the trio of modern poetry, as all their works were published in the same period.

== Family ==
Ramakrishna Rao was born in a scholar's family on May 20, 1896, to Lakshmi Narasimha Shastri and Bapamma couple in Ananthavaram village, Tenali taluk of Guntur district. His grandfather was a poet, and his father was a scholar in both the Sanskrit and Telugu languages. When Abburi was a child, the Chellapilla Venkata Sastri, one of the duo poets of Tirupati Venkata Kavulu, was a frequent visitor to their house. Abburi was also a multilingual poet who read thoroughly the Sanskrit, Telugu, English, Bengali, and Persian literature. At the age of 15, Abburi's family got him married to his maternal uncle's daughter, Rukmini. They have four sons and three daughters. His eldest son, Late Abburi Varadarajeswara Rao, was a writer, critic, and Chairman of the Official Linguistic Society. His daughter-in-law, Late Abburi Chayadevi, was a modern feminist writer, novelist, and Sahitya Academi Awardee. His second son, late Abburi Gopalakrishna, was a painter and associated with several art institutions. He held several key positions and retired as the Director of Theatre Arts at Andhra University.

== Education ==
Abburi's schooling took place in Tenali until the 5th grade. He was accepted at Mahbub College High School in Secunderabad, also studying Arabic. He joined Noble College to study FA (today's intermediate). There, Balijepalli Lakshmikantam, Govindarajula Subba Rao became Abburi's friends. When Abburi entered Sanskrit College in Mysore, the college principal was Kattamanchi Ramalingareddy. He read Abburi's verse "Mallikamba," which was published in 1915. Abburi became a friend of Rallapalli Ananthakrishna Sharma as well. Abburi learned Veena from Veena Seshanna in 1916. The latter three years of Abburi's fruitful life in Mysore contributed to his creativity. There, he wrote classic verses like Vuhaagaanamu and Nadee Sundari. He also wrote a poem, titled "Andhra Kanthirava" (Lion among Andhra warriors), in praise of Kodi Ramamurthy. He went to Calcutta in 1918 to take admission to City College to pursue a B.A. There, he became vice-president of the Bengal Andhra Association after "Akkiraju Umapati", a scholar. After graduating with a BA, he spent some time in Santiniketan and returned to Andhra Pradesh state. Abburi got the support of Congress leaders such as Bhogaraju Pattabhiramaiah, Cherukuvada Venkata Narasimham, and of poets such as Chellapilla Venkata Sastri, Tripuraneni Ramaswamy, Mutnuri Krishnarao, and the editor of "Krishna Patrika".

== In the Independence Movement ==
In 1919, during the days of the independence movement in Andhra Pradesh, Abburi participated in the independence movement under the leadership of Andhra Ratna Duggirala Gopalakrishnayya, who was conducting Ramadandu. At that time, Abburi had written a Burra Katha (Jangam Story) called Jallianwala Bhag and performed it at various places. It became popular among the public but was banned by the British government. This publication will also become unavailable very soon. Abburi was also affiliated with the trade unions and the leaders of the Communist Party. It was on that occasion that he became close to "Puchhapalli Sundarayya" and "MN Roy".

== In literature ==
Abburi wrote a poem titled Jalanjali as early as 1909 while studying in the Fifth Form. Abburi spent his time at Santiniketan with Gurudev Rabindranath Tagore between the years 1917 and 1919. Then he wrote verses "Vuhaganam", Niradambarataa Bhaavanaa Balaalu." The poets, writers such as Devulapalli Krishna Sastri, Srirangam Srinivasa Rao (Sri Sri), Balantrapu Rajanikanta Rao, and linguists like Professor Bhadriraju Krishnamurthi regarded Abburi Ramakrishna Rao as their mentor and addressed him as the master. They were having several literary discussions. Abburi suggested to the editor Nageshwara Rao Pantulu in his "Andhra Patrika" Magazine to introduce a new feature, Sarasvatanubandham, in 1917–1918. The feature was initiated with his article "Abhinava Kavita Prasamsa". Then, in 1924–1925, he made them initiate another new supplement, "Rasamanjari" in that magazine. His poems reflect completeness, glory, and augustness similar to the classical poems of the Sanskrit poetry. He added new styles to the poems of Nannaya. His literary versions include "Chatuvulu", "Asuvulu", and "Sonnets". In 1936, he joined with the writers Premachand, Najjad Zaheer, and Hiren Mukharjee and established the All India Progressive Writers Association. He was one of the editors of the association journal Indian Literature. In 1939, he established the Indian Renaissance Association, joining with M.N.Roy, Lakshmana Sastri, and Satchitananda Vatsayan, which has been instrumental in the literary revival.

== In Plays, Theatre ==
He was very fond of dramas. He wrote, directed plays, and also performed in Hyderabad and Delhi. He acted in dramas such as Kanyasulkam and Pratimasundari. He acted as Ramappapantulu in the drama Kanyasulkam, impressing the public. His association with drama organizations such as Natali and Natya Goshti was an example of Abburi's service to theatre. In 1957, he played a key role in establishing the Academy of Music, Drama, Literature, and Fine Arts for the Andhra Pradesh State Government. Following his suggestion, the Akasavani (Air-India Broadcasting) began broadcasting 90 minutes of national drama in 1957. He translated the drama Mruchakatikam, and it was telecast on Delhi Doordarshan. It was also performed in the presence of Dr. Sarvepalli Radhakrishnan at Rashtrapati Bhavan. After his retirement, he collaborated with A. R. Krishna, Minister Srinivasa Rao, and others to set up Natya Vidyalaya in Hyderabad, where he directed dramas and began a one-year certified studies in Theatre Arts. He gave a convocation address at the National School of Drama, Delhi.

== In Library, Library Science ==
After establishing Andhra University (Andhra Vishwakala Parishad) in 1926, Kattumanchi Ramalingareddy became the Vice-Chancellor of the university and appointed Abburi to the library. When Sarvepalli Radhakrishnan was the Vice-Chancellor, Dr. M. O. Thomas was appointed Librarian, and Abburi was sent to the Telugu department of the university as the first faculty. He also taught the Sanskrit language there. Abburi Ramakrishna Rao was later appointed a university librarian and worked there for about 30 years. When he was appointed a librarian, he did not qualify for a professional librarian position. He was awarded the honorary degree "Fellow of Library Association, London" (FLA) from the British Library Association, London. Abburi was a librarian and a scholar of the literary and cultural sphere. Many poets and scholars consulted him. It contributed to the rise of the literary atmosphere in the Visakhapatnam area. Recognizing the need for trained staff at different levels to ensure the proper functioning of libraries, Abburi introduced the Library Science Course at Andhra University at the Diploma level. His close association with Andhra University Vice-Chancellors, especially with Dr. V.S. Krishna, helped him to develop the university library and library studies in the university. Abburi Ramakrishna Rao retired in 1960, 2/3 years later, completing his term.

Regarding libraries, he said that "libraries are not orphanages... they should not develop like orphanages. When Kurnool was the capital of Andhra Pradesh, Abburi was actively involved in the State Library Committee's activities, discussed the issues of the public library movement, and contributed to the district librarians. Most of these librarians were his students. Abburi was instrumental in the creation of the Andhra Pradesh Library Act when the state of Andhra Pradesh was newly formed.

== Titles, Honors ==
He refused many titles and honours. The Andhra University, recognising the key role played by him for Telugu Literary Service, the development of the Andhra, and Public Libraries conferred an honorary doctorate with the title of "Kalaprapurna" to Abburi on August 3, 1974, in their 47th Convocation. He accepted only this award. After the formation of the Andhra Pradesh State in 1953, the State Government sought the advice and cooperation of Abburi in establishing the State Central Library in 1956 to widen the linkage of libraries in the newly created State of Vishalandra. As the president of the "Vishakha Writers' Association", he started editing Nannayya Pada Suchi. He was affiliated with Kendra Sahitya Akademi and Kendra Sangeet Natak Academy. After the formation of Sahitya Akademi, he planned on editing "Tikkanna" and other reference tools and the "Catalogue of 20th century Telugu Literary Publications". He translated Rabindranath Tagore's plays into Telugu in 1957–58 at the request of the Sahitya Academy.

== Death ==
Abburi died on April 30, 1979. A few days before his death, Abburi asked Prof. Bhadriraju Krishnamurti to write his last poem, when he went to visit him:

Original Telugu Version (English Translation)
"chacchi poyi ecchata keguno ("Where does the living creature go after dying?
emi yaguno evarikerugaraadu (What happens to it? No one knows!)
erukaleni vaaralememo cheppagaa (Ignorant people say vague things)
vini tapinchuvaaru venavelu" (Thousands listen and agonise over them")

Following Abburi's last request, his ashes were kept at M.N.Roy's grave in Dehradun.

== Literary works ==
- Vuhaganam, other works (Compilation Volume of Poetry). First edition 1973, Second edition published in 1994.
- Mallikamba (1915–16) - published in Andhra Bharati Patrika
- Nadisundari (play) - published in 1923
- Erra Ganneru - published in 1924
- SuryaRaju Cheppina Kathalu - published in Krishna Patrika, 1923
- Kalpana Kathalu - published in Krishna Patrika, 1923
- Megha Lekhyamulu - published in Sarada Patrika, 1923
- Mangalasutram (Crime Investigation Novel) - published in 1924.
- Mangalasutram (Includes the novel and compilation of other stories) - published in 1995.
- Vuhaganamu and other poetry - Kavita Publications collected the literary works of Abburi and published them as a compilation.
