= Tripuraneni =

Tripuraneni is a Telugu surname. Notable persons with that name include:

- Tripuraneni Gopichand (1910–1962), Indian Telugu writer, playwright and film director
- Tripuraneni Maharadhi (1930–2011), Indian Telugu film, screenplay, dialogue and script writer
- Tripuraneni Ramaswamy (1887–1943), Indian Telugu lawyer, playwright, and reformer
- Tripuraneni Varaprasad, Indian Telugu actor, film maker, son of Tripuraneni Maharadhi

== See also ==
- 21958 Tripuraneni (VU185), a minor planet discovered in 1999
