= Abburi =

Abburi may refer to:

- Abburu (Abburi), village in Andhra Pradesh, India

== People with the given name ==
- Abburi Chayadevi (born 1933), Indian writer
- Abburi Ravi, Indian screenwriter
