= Perugu =

Perugu may refer to

- Curd (India), Telugu word for yogurt
- Perugu Ramakrishna, Indian poet and writer
- Perugu Siva Reddy, Indian eye surgeon
