= Sanyasipura =

Sanyasipura is a small village in Mysore district of Karnataka state, India.

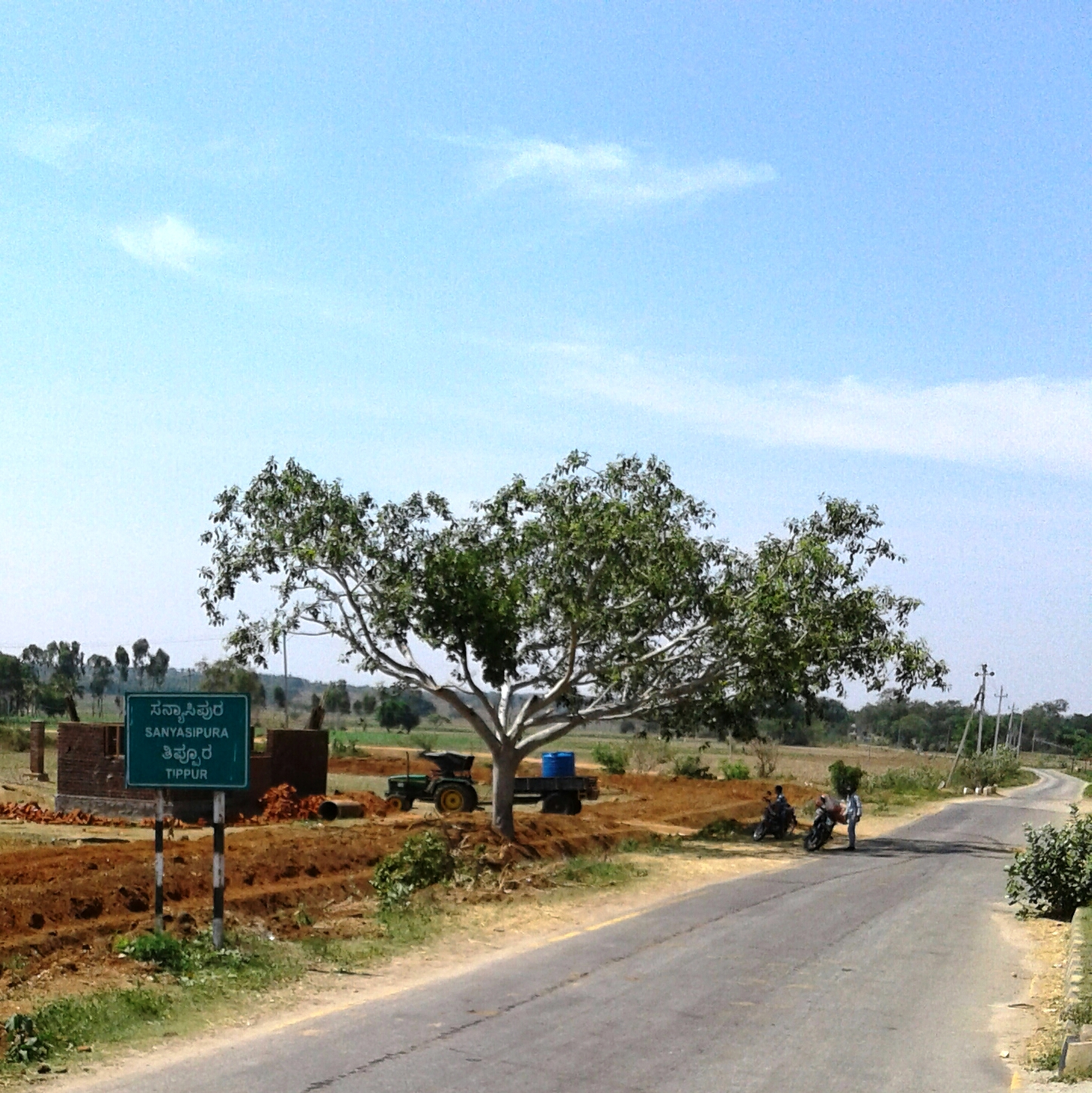
Sanyasipura road

== Location ==
Sanyasipura is located 5.5 km north of Krishnarajanagara.

== Demographics ==
Sanyasipura village has 356 people living in 80 houses. The total area of the village is 68 hectares.

== Postal code ==
There is a post office in the village and the PIN code is 571601.

== Education ==
Government Primary School, Sanyasipura has grades from first to fifth.
