= Konda Venkatappayya =

Indian lawyer, freedom fighter, and politician (1866–1948)

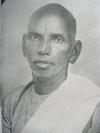
- Konda Venkatappayya

Madras Legislative Council

Personal details
- Born: 1866 Guntur, Andhra Pradesh
- Died: 1948 (aged 81–82)
- Party: Indian National Congress
- Spouse: Venkata Subbamamba
- Children: 6; 2 boys and 4 girls

Konda Venkatappayya or Konda Venkatappaiah B.L. (1866–1948) was a noted Indian lawyer, freedom fighter, and politician from what is now Andhra Pradesh. He was one of the founders and the first editor of Krishna Patrika, a leading weekly Telugu magazine during the early 20th century.

== Early life ==
He was born in a Brahmin family in old Guntur to Kotayya and Butchamma in 1866. He studied at the Mission high school, Guntur, and Madras Christian College. He graduated B.L.

== Career ==
Venkatappayya started practising law in Machilipatnam. After the division of the Krishna district and formation of the Guntur district, he moved to Guntur. He was allied with the Mylapore clique.

=== Krisna Patrika ===
He founded the Krishna Patrika in 1902 along with Dasu Narayana Rao and edited the weekly magazine till 1905. He had given the editorial responsibilities to Mutnuri Krishna Rao when he moved to Guntur.

=== Indian Freedom Movement ===
He left the practice and joined the Congress party. He was secretary of the first Andhra Mahasabha conference held at Bapatla in 1913 and president of the Nellore conference in 1917. He was president of Guntur district congress committee and rose to the position of secretary of All India Congress Committee in 1923. He was president of Andhra Pradesh Congress Committee between 1918 and 1923. He actively participated in various activities of the Indian freedom movement and was jailed in 1930, 1932 and 1942.

He translated "The Rise of the Dutch Republic" (1856) by John Lothrop Motley, into the Telugu language in 1922, while a prisoner in Cuddalore jail. He was drawn to the heroic saga of the Dutch led by William the Silent in 16th century against the Spanish. He also wrote his autobiography in two volumes. He wrote Adhunika Rajyanga Samsthalu, which was published in 1932.

When Mahatma Gandhi launched the Civil disobedience movement in 1930–31, he was president of Andhra Pradesh Congress Committee and in charge of the movement in the State.

He was elected to the Madras Legislative Council from Guntur-Tenali constituency in 1937 and worked as Secretary of the Congress party.

== Family ==
Venkatappayya married Venkata Subbamma. They had 6 children, four girls and two boys. Two boys and two girls died in their early life. His two daughters are Konda Buchi Laxmamma and Konda Parvathi Devi. His daughter Konda Parvathi Devi has graduated from Benares Hindu University. She was elected at Member of Andhra Pradesh Legislative Council. She has donated the "Desa Bhakta Bhawan" to Navodaya Vidyalaya Samiti in the year 1987. It has a historical monument and leaders like Mahatma Gandhi, Annie Besant, Pandit Jawaharlal Nehru, Patel and others stayed in this building during Indian freedom movement.
