= Adaganahalli =

Village in Karnataka, India

- village
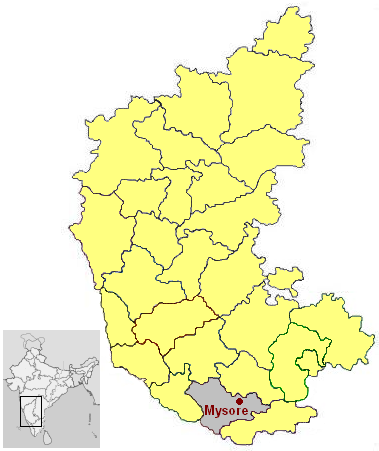
- Adaganahalli is in Mysore district

- Location in Karnataka, India Adaganahalli (India)
- Coordinates: 12.3080022°N 76.6954089°E
- Country: India
- State: Karnataka
- District: Mysore
- Talukas: Krishnarajanagara

Government
  - Body: Village Panchayat

Languages
  - Official: Kannada
- Time zone: UTC+5:30 (IST)
- ISO 3166 code: IN-KA
- Vehicle registration: KA
- Nearest city: Mysore
- Civic agency: Village Panchayat
- Website: karnataka.gov.in

Adaganahalli is a village in the southern state of Karnataka, India. It is located in the Krishnarajanagara taluk of Mysore district.

== See also ==
- Mysore
- Districts of Karnataka
