= Kavana =

Kavana may refer to:

- Kavana, Kannada poetry
- Kavana Cooperative, a nondenominational Jewish organization in Seattle, Washington
- Kavana (Judaism) or Kavanah, the intention to perform a mitzva
- Kafana or kavana, a type of coffeeshop in some South Slavic areas
- Kavana (Hadgaon), a village in Hadgaon taluka India.

== People with the name ==
- Kavana (singer), British singer
  - Kavana (album), an album by Kavana
- Kavana Sarma, Indian professor and Telugu fiction writer
- Ron Kavana, Irish singer

== See also ==
- Flex Kavana, former ring name of former wrestler Dwayne Johnson
- Kavana Kaumudi, a journal of Sanskrit poetry published by Pandalam Kerala Varma
- Kavana Gella, a work by Andayya
