= Gandhanahalli =

- village
- Country: India
- State: Karnataka
- District: Mysore
- Talukas: Krishnarajanagara

Government
  - Body: Gram panchayat

Population (2001)
  - Total: 5,106

Languages
  - Official: Kannada
- Time zone: UTC+5:30 (IST)
- ISO 3166 code: IN-KA
- Vehicle registration: KA
- Website: karnataka.gov.in

Gandhaahalli is a village in the southern state of Karnataka, India. It is located in the Krishnarajanagara taluk of Mysore district in Karnataka.

== Demographics ==
As of the 2001 India census, Gandhanahalli had a population of 5106 with 2585 males and 2521 females. Gandhanhalli is located 56 km from the district headquarters, Mysore. This village's name came from a man who was the only son of a widower. His name is Gandha (Shrigandha). Both are living in a jungle, lonely. Gandha is a brave man. The goddess Adishakti Shri Hunasamma is located in the south. Behind the Hunasamma temple was another temple, i.e. Shri Anjaneya Swami temple. There is something special in this temple. Most temples worldwide are east-facing, but the Anjaneya temple is west-facing.

== See also ==
- Mysore
- Districts of Karnataka
