= T. Gopichand =

T. Gopichand may refer to:

- Tripuraneni Gopichand (1910–1962), Telugu writer and novelist
- Gopichand (actor) (Tottempudi Gopichand, born 1979), Indian actor in Telugu films
