= Hosaramanahalli =

- Village
- Location in Karnataka, India
- Coordinates: 12.367743°N 76.417261°E
- Country: India
- State: Karnataka
- District: Mysore
- Elevation: 770 m (2,530 ft)

Population (2011)
  - Total: 9,070

Languages
  - Official: Kannada
- Time zone: UTC+5:30 (IST)
- PIN: 571 103
- Telephone code: 08222
- Vehicle registration: KA-45

Hosaramanahalli is a village located in the Mysore district of Karnataka state, India. It is located on the banks of the Lakshmana Tirtha River.

== Population ==
The population of Hosaramanahalli is about 9500 and the literacy rate is 45%. The majority of the villagers are dependent on agriculture for their livelihood.

== Transportation ==
Hosaramanahalli is located at SH-57 which has state transport buses from Mysore, Krishnarajanagara, and Hunsur. The nearest airport is Mysore Airport, and the nearest railway station is in Krishnarajanagara.
