= Hebbal, Krishnarajanagara =

Hebbal
- village
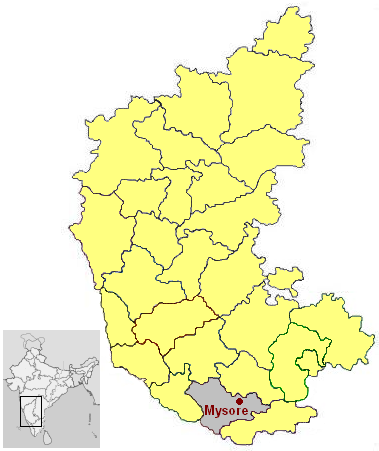
- Hebbal is in Mysore district
- Interactive map of Hebbal
- Coordinates: 12.5456°N 76.4165°E
- Country: India
- State: Karnataka
- District: Mysore
- Boroughs: Hebbal

Government
  - Body: Village Panchayat

Population (2011)
  - Total: 4,973

Languages
  - Official: Kannada
- Time zone: UTC+5:30 (IST)
- ISO 3166 code: IN-KA
- Vehicle registration: KA
- Nearest city: Mysore
- Civic agency: Village Panchayat
- Website: karnataka.gov.in

Hebbal is a village in the state of Karnataka, India. It is located in the Krishnarajanagara taluk of Mysore district.

== See also ==
- Mysore
- Districts of Karnataka
