= Devasthana (disambiguation) =

Devasthana and devasthanam are terms referring to Hindu temples.

The terms may also refer to:

- Devasathan, the main Hindu temple in Thailand
- Devasthanam (film), a 2012 Indian Telugu-language film
