= Janardhana Maharshi =

Sanskrit film Director, poet, producer and Indian film writer

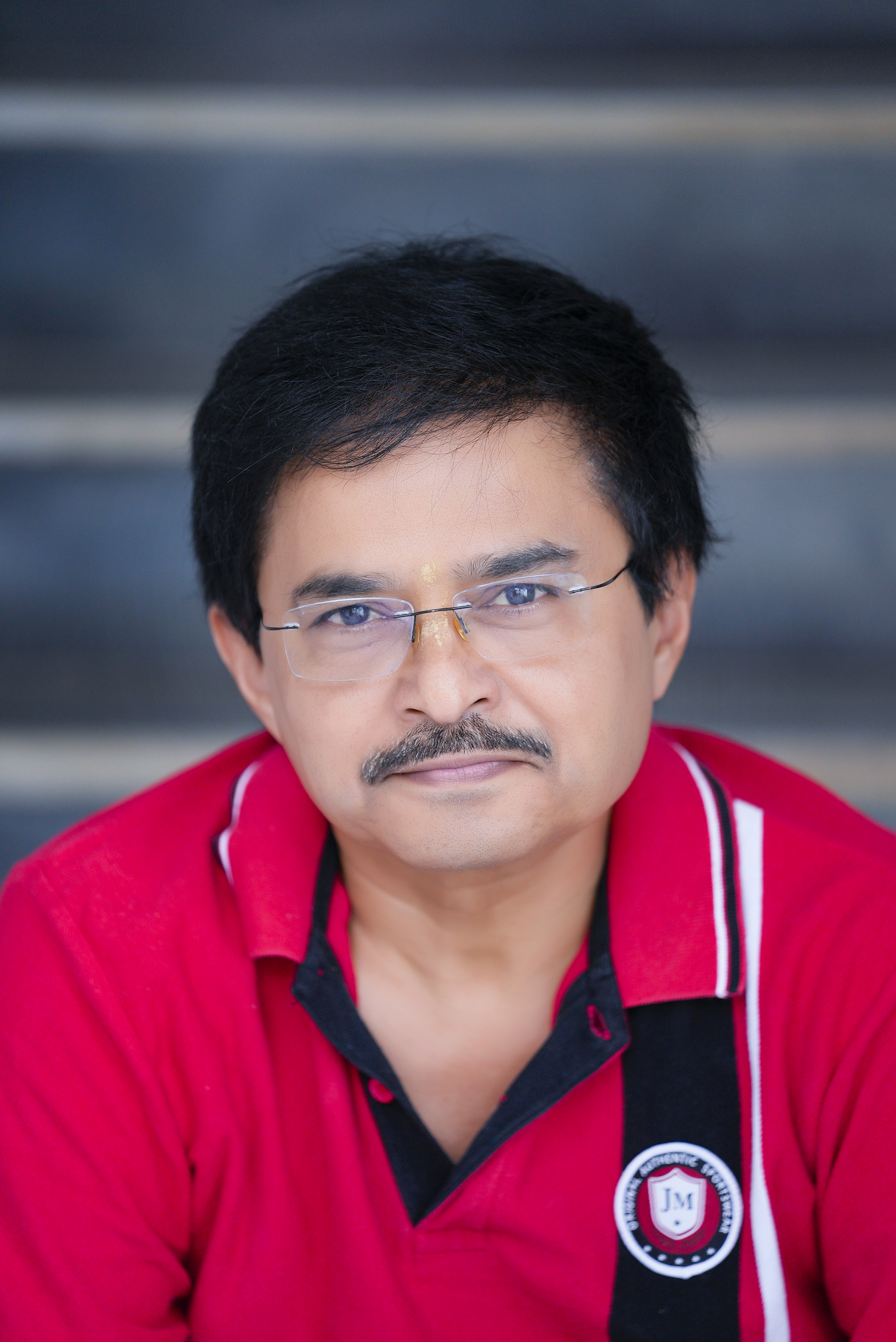
- Janardhana Maharshi in 2022
- Born: 16 May; Kandukur, Andhra Pradesh, India
- Occupations: writer; film director; screenwriter; producer
- Years active: 1993–present
- Notable work: Founder - Bharathiya Sanskrit Film Federation
- Spouse: Lakshmi Sunitha
- Children: 2
- Website: https://www.janardhanamaharshi.com

Janardhana Maharshi (born 16 May) is an Indian story writer, dialogue writer, author and film director who works predominantly in Telugu and Kannada films.

== Early life ==
Maharshi was born in Kandukuru, Prakasham district and completed his schooling and higher education in Chittoor. He began his career as a script assistant to Tanikella Bharani in 1989.

== Notable works ==
In 2026, launched Bharathiya Sanskrit Film Federation to promote films in Sanskrit. Federation would support filmmakers for worldwide promotions and film festival submissions.

== Filmography ==
Year	Title	Writer	Language	Notes
1993	Pekata Papa Rao	Story	Telugu	
1993	One by Two	Story	Telugu	
1994	Namasthe Anna	Yes	Telugu	
1995	Aunty	Screenplay	Telugu	
1996	Pellala Rajyam	Yes	Telugu	
1997	Vammo Vatto O Pellaamo	Yes	Telugu	
1997	Maa Nannaku Pelli	Yes	Telugu	
1997	Pattukondi Chuddam	Story	Telugu	Also actor
1998	Kanyadanam	Story	Telugu	
1998	O Panaipothundi Babu	Uncredited	Telugu	Also actor
1998	Maavidaakulu	Dialogues	Telugu	
1999	Pilla Nachindi	Yes	Telugu	
2000	Chala Bagundi	Dialogues	Telugu	
2000	Ammo! Okato Tareekhu	Dialogues	Telugu	Uncredited
2000	Goppinti Alludu	Dialogues	Telugu	
2000	Moodu Mukkalaata	Story	Telugu	Also dialogues
2000	Mister 420	Yes	Telugu	
2000	Hands Up	Dialogues	Telugu	
2001	Maa Aavida Meeda Ottu Mee Aavida Chala Manchidi	Dialogues	Telugu	Also actor
2001	Bava Nachadu	Story	Telugu	Also actor
2001	Jabili	Story	Telugu	Also dialogues
2003	Sriramachandrulu	Story	Telugu	
2003	Maa Alludu Very Good	Dialogues	Telugu	
2003	Oka Radha Iddaru Krishnula Pelli	Story	Telugu	
2004	Aaruguru Pativratalu	Dialogues	Telugu	
2005	Hungama	Dialogues	Telugu	
2005	Evadi Gola Vaadidhi	Yes	Telugu	
2005	Aakash	Story	Kannada	
2006	Gopi – Goda Meeda Pilli	Story	Telugu	Also director
2006	Mayajalam	Story	Telugu	
2006	Dattha	Yes	Kannada	
2007	Arasu	Screenplay	Kannada	
2008	Meravanige	Story	Kannada	
2008	Bandhu Balaga	Yes	Kannada	
2008	Bindaas	Story	Kannada	
2008	Bombaat	Story	Kannada	
2008	Paramesha Panwala	Story	Kannada	
2009	Abhay	Story	Kannada	
2011	Jai Bolo Telangana	Yes	Telugu	Also actor
2012	Devasthanam	Yes	Telugu	Also director
2012	Sarada Saradaga	Story	Telugu	
2012	Eega	Dialogues	Telugu	
2013	Pavitra	Yes	Telugu	Also director, actor and lyricist
2017	Raj Vishnu	Screenplay	Kannada	
2019	Viswadarshanam	Yes	Telugu	Also director, producer, actor, composer and lyricist
2019	Venky Mama	Story	Telugu	Also dialogues
2019	Natasaarvabhowma	Story	Kannada	
2024	Sloka	Yes	Sanskrit	Also director, producer, actor, composer and lyricist
2024	Je Jatt Vigarh Gya	Yes	Punjabi	
2025	Vrusshabha	Dialogues	Telugu; Malayalam	Telugu version only

== Short Films ==
- Sa Pa Sa (2025) - Telugu
- Rundravanam - 6/4 piece of land (2026) - Sanskrit

== Television ==
=== Actor ===
- Mutyamanta Pasupu (ETV)
- Rama Sita (Zee Telugu)
- Pellayindaa? Tikkakudirindaa?

== Books ==
=== Noble poems ===
- Vennamuddalu (2003)

=== Novels ===
- Garbha Gudiloki (2004, 2021)

=== Novellas ===
- Padmavibushan Parimaladevi (2025)
- Mangalaswaram Subhalashmi (2025)
- Shoonya

=== Playlets ===
- Sahastra (2025)
- Samskrutha (2025)
- Shlokha (2025)

=== Poetry ===
- Naku Nenu Rasukunna Premalekha (2008)
- Kavigaane Kannumoostha (2014)

=== Short stories ===
- Panchamrutham (2005)
- Madhura Sambhashanalu (2017)

=== Stories ===
- Chidambara Rahasyam (2019)
- Smasananiki Vyragyam (2021)

== Awards ==
Work	Medium	Award	Nominated	Won
Devasthanam	Film	Santosham Critic Award - 2012		Yes
Viswadarshanam	Panorama - Documentary	South Asian International Film Festival (SAIFF)	Official Selection	No
Sloka	Film - Sanskrit	Cannes World Film Festival - 2025; Jaipur international Film Festival - 2026	Official Selection	No

== See also ==
- List of Telugu-language writers
