= Asamardhuni Jivayatra =

1947 novel by Tripuraneni Gopich

- Cover of English translation, 2003
- Author: Tripuraneni Gopichand
- Translator: D. S. Rao
- Language: Telugu
- Genre: Psychological novel
- Publication date: 1947
- Publication place: India
- English publication date: 2003

Asamardhuni Jivayatra (literally: The Life Journey of a Hapless Soul, English title The Bungler) is a 1947 Telugu language novel by Tripuraneni Gopichand. It is a psychological novel, using stream of consciousness technique. One of Gopichand's best-known works, it is regarded as the first psychological novel in Telugu literature.

== Characters ==
The principle characters of the novel are:

- Sitaramrao – the protagonist and the scion of a rich family
- Sitaramrao's wife
- Sitaramrao's daughter
- Ramayya – an old man from Sitaramrao's village

== Plot ==
The protagonist of the novel is Sitaramrao. He comes from a distinguished family, whose grandeur is celebrated. At the start of the novel, Sitaramrao's father on his deathbed commands his son to maintain the family's honour. Though The village elder Ramayya cautions him to be careful with his wealth, Sitaramrao, inspired by lofty ideals, pays for a lavish funeral, and arranges for people with large debts to his family to repay only a small proportion. He is soon reduced to straitened circumstances, and forced to seek employment, but fails to hold any job. One day he dreams of seeing an androgynous figure composed half by the goddess Parvati and half of Paramesvara. As one side speaks, the other is veiled, but they both assure him that whatever he hungers after will be provided. On waking, a feeling of irritation provokes him to think that unless life is easy, and lived effortlessly, it is better to die.

Sitaramrao's uncle turns down a request for a loan, replying that Sitaramrao's father had treated him poorly: it was he who built the family's wealth, which Sitaramrao's father had squandered, and in his view, the son was behaving as his father had. Sitaramrao in turn insults his uncle. He begins to act strangely, beating in succession his daughter and his wife, and talking to a gecko. He drifts into fantasies of becoming a robber and raping a woman. He takes to wandering in bazaars, singing or haranguing passers-by. He visits a prostitute, then challenges a speaker addressing a meeting and is beaten up, whereupon the wise Ramayya takes him to the shelter of a rain tree, and tries unsuccessfully to reason with him so that he might mend his ways and return home.

One day, sitting alone, Sitaramrao cries out "All is illusion" and walks to the cremation grounds, where he imagines seeing his father rolling his eyes, gnashing his teeth and chastising him as a wastrel. His own shadow seems to join with his father and attack him. The following day Ramayya passes by and, on examining the torn bones and scattered flesh there, identifies the mangled body as that of Sitaramrao.

== Analysis ==
The novel was first published in 1947. The major portions of the narration is a stream of consciousness of the protagonist, Sitaramrao. Set in an unstated year during the 1940s, the story occurs in an unnamed village in Andhra Pradesh, on its way to becoming a town. Sitaramrao inherited megalomania from his father and this theme pervades the novel.

Sitaramrao's father's death-bed demand that he maintain the prestige of the family is a key point in Sitaramrao's life, causing an inner conflict between the self-aggrandizement which he inherited from his father and the gentler, more sensitive feelings from his mother's side. He is dominated by the former, which deprives him of his commonsense; as a result hunger, marriage, procreation and maintaining a family appear to be trivial and mean concerns to him. Paradoxically, when Sitaramrao falls in love himself, marries and has children, he considers this to be unnatural.

His life and family is shattered due to his uncompromising character, but he attributes his misfortunes to others, and not to his own flaws. He tries to rationalise his defects, at the same time withdrawing into an imaginary world failing even to hold on to his job. When his maternal uncle deceives him, he thinks it a sign of his greatness that he does not concern himself with money matters. He cannot act against external events, only himself. He is sensitive enough to understand when others are hurt, but cannot express this to them. His wife Indira understands him and he loves her for this, nevertheless he is unable to express his love to her. He blames her for his own failings and the consequent inner turmoil sends him mad and leads to his death.

== Reception and criticism ==
Considered to be a classic of modern Telugu literature, the novel is the best-known psychological novel in Telugu. It is regarded as the first psychological novel in Telugu literature and influenced the later development of Telugu writing. It was translated into English by D. S. Rao under the title The Bungler (2003).

Lipipuspa Nayak observes, in her review, that "the novel seems to falter in the last chapter that narrates the transition of the protagonist from an incompetent illusionist, unable to overcome the hangover of the family values to a schizophrenic who eventually commits suicide." However, she notes that the end of the novel is thematically reasonable. She found the progression of protagonist from a romantic rebel to a questioning philosopher and a compulsive campaigner for his views to be "abrupt".
