= Pattukondi Chuddam =

1997 Telugu comedy film

- Directed by: Siva Nageswara Rao
- Screenplay by: Siva Nageswara Rao
- Story by: Janardhana Maharshi
- Dialogues by: Kommuri Madhava Reddy
- Produced by: Kandikanti Raj Kumar
- Starring: Suresh; Sudhakar; Sanghavi; Jayasudha; Nizhalgal Ravi; Brahmanandam
- Cinematography: N. V. Suresh Kumar
- Edited by: K. Ramesh
- Music by: Veenapaani
- Production company: Pramada Films
- Release date: 8 August 1997
- Country: India
- Language: Telugu
- Budget: ₹80 lakh

Pattukondi Chuddam (transl. Catch us if you can) is a 1997 Indian Telugu-language comedy thriller film directed by Siva Nageswara Rao from a story by Janardhana Maharshi. The film stars Suresh, Sudhakar, Sanghavi, Jayasudha, Nizhalgal Ravi and Brahmanandam in key roles, with music composed by Veenapaani. The film marked the debuts of dialogue writer Madhava Reddy and music director Veenapani.

The film follows two unemployed youths who resort to robbery after suicide attempts. After stealing ₹50 lakh, they become entangled in a murder investigation and a family's dark secrets. Pattukondi Chuddam was praised for its humour and the performances of Brahmanandam, Suresh, and Sudhakar. The film was commercially successful. Brahmanandam later listed Pattukondi Chuddam among his top 11 films.

== Plot ==
The film follows two unemployed youth, Chanti and Bujji, who resort to robbing a bank after several suicide attempts. They successfully steal ₹50 lakh and bury it in a vacant plot. Simultaneously, Kathi Ramdas is on a revenge spree after the murder of his brother. A corrupt police sub-inspector implicates Chanti and Bujji in the murder, leading to their arrest.

While in custody, the duo learns that ₹2 crore were stolen from the same bank, though they only stole ₹50 lakh. Hoping for an early release, they admit to the false murder charges. However, Kathi Ramdas bribes the sub-inspector to release them on Independence Day, intending to kill them.

After their release, Chanti and Bujji discover that a building now stands on the site where they buried the stolen money. The house belongs to Baby, whose husband Srinivasa Rao "Seenu" works in Mumbai. Seenu had been fired as a bank manager due to the theft. Chanti and Bujji infiltrate Baby's house, posing as a Vastu pandit and a security guard, respectively, to recover the money.

As Kathi Ramdas relentlessly pursues Chanti and Bujji, the duo decides to redeem themselves by exposing Seenu's crimes to Baby. They discover that Seenu had embezzled ₹1.5 crore from the bank and was involved in the rape and murder of Chitra, whose skeletal remains were buried in the plot where Chanti and Bujji had hidden their ₹50 lakh. The police and media had been informed of a total theft of ₹2 crore, which encompassed not only the money stolen by Chanti and Bujji, but also Seenu's embezzlement. Baby eventually finds Seenu's diary, which reveals that he discovered and took the ₹50 lakh while burying Chitra's body. Confronted with these revelations, Baby hands Seenu over to the police, bringing the story to a dramatic conclusion.

== Cast ==
- Suresh as Chanti
- Sudhakar as Bujji
- Sanghavi
- Jayasudha as Baby
- Nizhalgal Ravi as Srinivasa Rao "Seenu"
- Brahmanandam as Kathi Ramdas
- Giri Babu
- Chalapathi Rao
- Tanikella Bharani as Police Sub-Inspector
- Rallapalli
- Mallikarjuna Rao
- Babu Mohan
- Gundu Hanumantha Rao
- Y. Vijaya
- Bengaluru Padma
- Gautham Raju
- Chitti Babu
- Janardhana Maharshi

== Production ==
The film marked another collaboration between director Siva Nageswara Rao and comedians Brahmanandam and Sudhakar after their previous films. The story and screenplay focused on light-hearted comedy, with situational humour.

Siva Nageswara Rao, known for creating memorable comedic characters, introduced Kathi Ramdas as a continuation of his earlier character Khan Dada from his films Money (1993), and Money Money (1994).

The dead body plotline in the film was inspired from a newspaper article which Nageswara Rao came across and used that "tragic news to humour's benefit".

== Music ==
The music for Pattukondi Chuddam was composed by Veenapaani, with lyrics by Chandrabose, Sirivennela Sitarama Sastry, and Suddala Ashok Teja. The soundtrack was released under the label Siva Musicals.

No.	Title	Lyrics	Singer(s)	Length
1.	"Sare Jaha Se Achha"	Chandrabose	Suresh Peters
2.	"Pattukondi Chuddam (Female version)"	Chandrabose	Sujatha Mohan
3.	"Ninnadaka Heartbeatu Emitandi"	Sirivennela Sitarama Sastry	S. P. Balasubrahmanyam, K. S. Chitra
4.	"Vinara Vinara Dosthu"	Chandrabose	Mano
5.	"Pattukondi Chuddam (Male version)"	Chandrabose	Mano
6.	"Jilebi Jilebi"	Suddala Ashok Teja	Mano, M. M. Srilekha

== Reception ==
=== Critical reception ===
Upon its release on 8 August 1997, Pattukondi Chooddam was well-received for its comedy and entertainment value, though the story faced some criticism.

Andhra Today reviewed the film as comedy-driven, praising Brahmanandam's performance as Kathi Ramdas, along with the comedic contributions of Suresh and Sudhakar. However, the review criticized the predictable story and lack of suspense, noting that Siva Nageswara Rao prioritized comedy over storytelling.

Griddaluru Gopala Rao of Zamin Ryot called the film a "laugh riot".

=== Box office ===
Pattukondi Chooddam was commercially successful. The film collected a distributor share of ₹1 crore in the Nizam territory.
