= Vennamuddalu =

Telugu Poetry

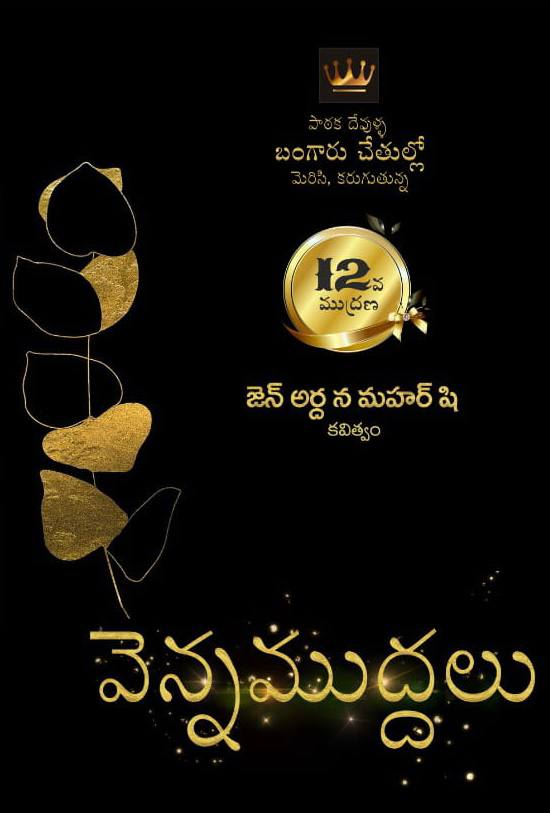
- Author: Janardhana Maharshi
- Language: Telugu
- Genre: Poetry
- Publisher: Anvikshiki Publishers
- Publication date: 2003
- Publication place: India
- Pages: 250
- ISBN: 978-81-950744-0-2

Vennamuddalu is a Telugu-language book, a collection of short poems written by literary author Janardhana Maharshi. The poetry is in simple language. This poetic text has gained popularity in the new age telugu poetry. The book was first published in 2003 and had 12 publications Since.
