= Swaraveenapani =

Indian writer

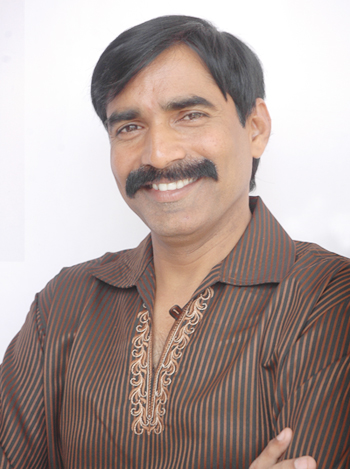
- Born: Ravela
- Citizenship: Indian
- Education: LL.B
- Occupations: Lyricist; music director

Swara Veenapani (born Vogeti Naga Venkata Ramana Murthy) is a lyricist and Telugu cinema music director. He holds a Guinness world record for longest church organ marathon.

== Career ==
Swara Veenapani's first film was Pattukondi Chuddam had a box office run of 100 days. Veenapani's latest films are Devasthanam and Mithunam. Recently he completed his research on 72 Melakartha Ragaas and he brought the entire theme as a song in a span of 6 and 1/2 minute and the other version is of 3 and 1/2 minute. He has been working for the last 16 years on the Swaranidhi project which has been registered as Swaranidhi. He is working vigorously to spread the same to the World which can be most useful to the Music Students, Musicians and Music Lovers to know the capsule format of 72 Mela karta ragas in an easy way. Swaranidhi project got a huge applause from the stalwarts of Indian Music.

== Filmography ==
- Pattukondi Chuddam (1997)
- Devasthanam (2012)
- Mithunam (2012)

== Guinness record ==
Swara Veenapani has set a Guinness world record for longest marathon church organ playing by rendering the 72 Melakarta ragas continuously on his musical instrument for 61 hours and 20 minutes(2 days 13 hours 20 minutes) at an event in London on 2 October 2019.

== Personal life ==
He was born in Ravela village, Tadikonda Mandal in Guntur district to Seetha Annapurnamma and Vogeti Lakshmi Narasimha Sastry. He is married to Lakshmi and has two children.
