= Vempalli Shariff =

Indian Short Story Writer

Vempalle Shareef
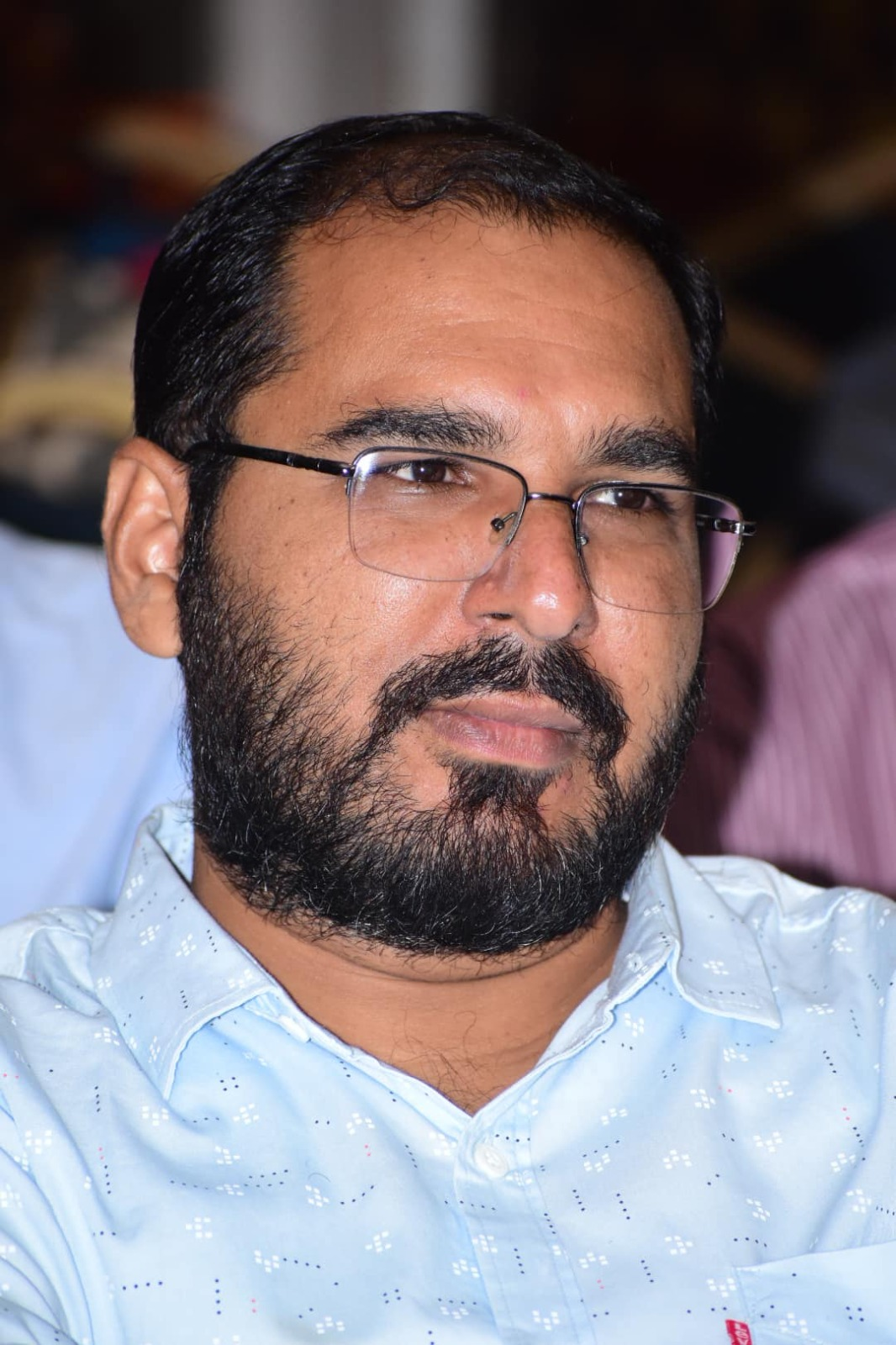
- Born: Sheikh Mohammed Shareef; April 18, 1980 (age 45); Vempalle, Kadapa district, Andhra Pradesh, India
- Other names: Shariff
- Education: MA (Telugu); MPhil (Breaking News Coverage in Telugu News Channels); PhD in Journalism (Language and Culture in Television Advertisements)
- Alma mater: Suravaram Pratap Reddy Telugu University
- Occupation(s): TV Journalist and writer
- Children: 2
- Parents: Rajasaheb (father); Nurjahan (mother)

Vempalle Shareef (born 18 April 1980) is an Indian Short Story Writer. He writes stories in Telugu. He is also a senior journalist. Sheikh Mohammed Shareef also known as Vempalle Shareef hails from Vempalli village of Kadapa district, Andhra Pradesh. He has so far published 60 stories in Telugu, out of which 30 are for children. Shareef has also worked as the Chief Sub Editor & News Presenter for Sakshi TV in Hyderabad. He was earlier an RJ with AIR, Hyderabad. Having an academic flair, he completed his PhD with the Potti Sreeramulu Telugu University.

Recently he was awarded by the Government of Andhra Pradesh, on the occasion of "Telugu Bhasha Dinothsavam". He also received Chaso award. He was also awarded the "Kendra Sahitya Academy Young Award".

Shareef's stories have been translated into many of Indian languages. His book, Jumma has been translated into English and Kannada languages. In Kannada, Jumma has received Kuvempu Bhasha Bharathi Award.

He writes lessons for Telugu Journalism students in Press Academy and Telugu University.

== Publications ==
- Jumma (2011) – Short stories (translated into Kannada)
- Tiyyani Chaduvu (2017) – Children’s stories
- Topi Jabbar (2017) – Short stories
- Kathaminar (2018, co-editor) – Anthology of Muslim stories from Andhra Pradesh
- Chongaroti (2020, editor) – Anthology of Rayalaseema Muslim stories
- Talugu (2015) – A single-story book about freedom from oppression.

The story Talugu was later adapted into a drama (Stage Show).

- Yuva (Under 40) (2022, editor) – Anthology of Telugu writers under 40
- Charala Pilli (2024) – Short story collection
