= Krishna Patrika =

Indian Telugu-language newspaper

- Type: Daily newspaper
- Owner(s): Konda Venkatappayya, Dasu Narayana Rao
- Founded: 1902; 124 years ago
- Headquarters: Vijayawada

Krishna Patrika is an Indian Telugu-language newspaper. It was founded in 1902 by Konda Venkatappayya and Dasu Narayana Rao as a weekly magazine. Mutnuri Krishna Rao was the editor of the publication from 1907 until his death in 1945.

== History ==
Krishna Patrika was started in Machilipatnam in 1902. Krishna Patrika started publishing on 2 February 1902 by founders Konda Venkatappayya and Dasu Narayana Rao as a weekly magazine. Venkatappayya edited until 1905. He gave the editorial responsibilities to Mutnuri Krishna Rao when he moved to Guntur.

== The newspaper ==
The vernacular press played a role in the Indian Freedom Movement. Several newspapers, both in English and the regional languages and in different parts of the country, prepared the people for the freedom struggle by instilling among them strong feelings towards independence.

In the Andhra region, among the Telugu journals, the Krishna Patrika played a prominent role in the freedom struggle. Krishna Patrika and Andhra Patrika were two newspapers in Telugu, which were started in the early years of the 20th century and survived till the country became independent.

A unique feature of the Krishna Patrika was that it was started by a District Association. Its first issue appeared on 2 February 1902, in accordance with a resolution of the Krishna District Association, passed in the year 1899. The Journal claimed that no other political association in the country was managing a newspaper for the purpose of political education. In 1909, the Krishna District Association gave up its ownership of the paper.

Mutnuri Krishna Rao was largely responsible for the success of the Krishna Patrika, who for a long time was its editor. He was one of the founders of the paper and from 1902 was associated with it as its sub-editor. In 1907 he became its editor and continued to serve the journals in that capacity until his death in 1945. Krishna Rao was known for his scholastic proficiency and oratory. He was an intellectual, nationalist and great writer in the Andhra region during his times. He invited the nationalist leader of Bengal, B.C. Pal, to tour Andhra during the Vandemataram movement in 1907 and Pal made a great impact on the Andhras. However, in later years Krishna Rao did not actively involve himself in politics, but many national leaders considered him as their political guru. Even though he was a supporter of the Congress and its policies, he kept himself aloof from the party to devote his entire time and attention to the Krishna Patrika.

During India's Freedom Struggle, particularly in the early phases, weekly journalism played a more important part than daily journalism. Daily newspapers were very few and were less popular than some weeklies. Krishna Patrika was a prominent nationalist weekly in the country, though it was started as a bi-weekly newspaper. It enjoyed a position of preeminence among the political weeklies in the Andhra region. But for a short stint as biweekly it remained a political weekly throughout the period of the struggle for freedom.

The Krishna Patrika carried on publicity for all the phases of India's struggle for freedom, like the Vandemataram movement, the Home-Rule movement, the Non-Cooperation Movement, the Civil Disobedience Movement and the Quit India Movement. It provided the leaders and active participants in the freedom struggle with much information, which they used against the British Government. To the common man, the material published in the journal, inspired and promoted patriotism.

The Krishna Patrika influenced not only the urban educated elite but also rural masses. During certain periods, the journal was sent free of cost to all schools in the rural areas and its contents were read not only to the students but also to the villagers. That increased the reach of the journal, extending its influence to the masses. Many contemporary leaders who were in their youth during the Freedom Struggle acknowledged the impact of Krishna Patrika. Prof. N. G. Ranga, Bezawada Gopala Reddy, Gottepati Brahmayya, Tenneti Viswanadham and others stated that the Krishna Patrika and Andhra Patrika influenced them in to abandon their studies to take active part in the Freedom Struggle. The confidential reports of the British Government, on the contemporary newspapers, mention the pernicious influence of the Krishna Patrika and the Andhra Patrika on the people.

The influence, popularity and services of the Krishna Patrika and Andhra Patrika so much impressed the people of Andhra, that they honoured the two papers in 1929. Celebrations to honour the people were organised on 8 and 9 September 1929, at Vijayawada. N. V. L. Narasimha Rao, Freedom Fighter, was the Chairman of the Reception Committee for the celebrations. An address eulogising the services of the papers was presented to the editors of the two papers. Konda Venkatappayya, speaking on that occasion, declared, "those two papers have been able to inculcate among the people, courage, spirit of sacrifice and intense patriotism". Certain Associations in Hyderabad like the Andhra Jana Sangham also met in Hyderabad and passed a resolution praising the services of Andhra Patrika and Krishna Patrika.

Kanuparti Varalakshmamma, a freedom fighter and social reformer, stated that many people left schools, resigned their jobs, faced the lathi blows, lost their property and entered the jails after reading the contents of Krishna Patrika.

Like many papers of those days, the Krishna Patrika faced many financial troubles. It survived due to contributions from philanthropists, zamindars and other patriots. The editor and other staff had to live on meagre salaries and sometimes lived without salaries.

== Revival ==
Popularly known as "Piratla" by his friends was a student activist, a social worker and a champion of citizens' rights to protect India's democratic institutions. He never worked for his personal benefit—he participated in Loknayak Jayaprakash Narayan's Movement as an all India Secretary for student's and youth wing. He struggled for safeguarding democracy during the Emergency Period and went underground for a year and spent his life under MISA for nine months in Musheerabad and Rajahmundry central jails in Andhra Pradesh. Later on, he took over the old Krishna Patrika and became an editor and publisher of the newspaper. Even today, with over 100 years of its existence, the Krishna Patrika is striving in the direction of India's renaissance in all walks of life. Under the editorship of Piratla, Krishna Patrika had celebrated its centenary celebrations at Delhi. Sri Mutnuri Krishna Rao, an editor of Telugu journalism, was the editor. Inspired by his editorials, people offered Satyagraha and wore Khadi for their life of this paper for more than four decades. Piratla Venkateswarlu began his career as a full-time Rashtriya Swayamsevak Sangh (RSS) worker. He was the All India General Secretary of Akhil Bharatiya Vidyarthi Parishad (ABVP), the students’ wing of the Bharatiya Janata Party. Later, he took up journalism by working for the news channel Jagruthi. He became the editor of Krishna Patrika Telugu daily in 1982 and ran the publication till 2012. He is also actively associated with the small newspapers' association of India. In August 2001, its centenary was celebrated in Delhi in quiet dignity with the blessings of India's Prime Minister, at that time Atal Bihari Vajpayee. Piratla Venkateswarlu died on 8 December 2014.

== Present day ==
The newspaper is now published in Vijayawada.
