= K.Varalakshmi =

Indian short story writer (born 1948)

K. Varalakshmi
- Born: 24 October 1948 (age 77) Jaggampeta, East Godavari, Andhra Pradesh, India
- Occupation: Short Story Writer
- Spouse: K. Ram Mohan Rao
- Children: Ravindra Phaniraj, Dr. K. Geeta, Sri Lalitha

Website
- telugurachayita.org

K. Varalakshmi (born 24 October 1948) is a Telugu short story writer.

== Biography ==
She was born in Jaggampeta, East Godavari, Andhra Pradesh. She is the eldest daughter of Palla Venkata Ramana and Bangaramma.

Her schooling was completed in Jaggampeta. Once financially settled, she finished her M.A. from Andhra University.

She is married to Kala Ramamohana Rao in 1964. They have three children. Their son, K. Ravindra Phaniraj is a Tourism Project consultant in Hyderabad. Her elder daughter, Dr. K. Geeta is a Telugu poetry writer. Their younger daughter, Sri Lalitha is also a story writer.

Most of her writings addresses the women's of rural areas.

== Awards ==
=== Poetry ===
Sri Sri, Devulapalli KrishnaSastry, Kandukuri Rajyalakshmi and many more.

=== Story ===
- Suseela Narayana Reddy award
- Chaso Spurthi award
- Vimalasanthi award
- Sahrudaya Sahiti award
- Hasan Fatima award
- Ranjani award
- Ajo-Vibho award
- Auto Katha award
- Tana Katha award
- Rangavalli award
- Pulikanti award
- R.S.Krishna Murthy award
- Dharmanidhi award from Telugu University
- Sri Peddibhotla Subbaramayya award and many more

== Selected works ==
=== Story ===
- Jeevaragam, 1996
- Matti-Bangaram, 2001
- Athadu-Nenu, 2007
- Kshatagatra, 2014
- Pittagullu, 2016

=== Poetry ===
- Aame, 2002

=== Other writings ===
Many more stories, poems, essays and novels.

- Katha lonchi Katha (Serial)- koumudi patrika (from 2016)
- Na Jeevana Yaanamlo(Serial Autobiography) - vihanga patrika (from 2013 till date)
