= Namini Subrahmanyam Naidu =

Telugu writer, journalist

నామిని సుబ్రహ్మణ్యం నాయుడు Namini Subrahmanyam Naidu
- Born: 16 October 1960 (age 65); Mittoor Village, Chittoor district, Andhra Pradesh, India
- Citizenship: India
- Education: Master of Science (India)
- Spouse: Prabhavati
- Children: Deepthi, Tom Sawyer
- Writing career
- Genres: Stories, Novels
- Notable works: Pachanaku sakshiga, Sinabba kathalu, Pala podugu, Munikannadi sedyam

Namini Subrahmanyam Naidu is a famous Telugu writer from Chittoor district of Andhra Pradesh, India. His stories have received wide acclaim owing to the depiction of his life experiences as stories in Rayalaseema dialect. His stories have first been published in Andhra Jyothy newspaper during 1980s and 1990s.

== Early life and education ==
Namini was born in 1948 in Mittur, Chittoor district. He hails from an agricultural family. He completed his primary schooling in Mittur and High school in a neighboring village Venakatapuram. He did his M.Sc from Sri Venkateswara University, Tirupati. He has an elder sister and an elder brother. He is currently living in Tirupati with his wife Prabhavati. They have a son named Tom Sawyer and a daughter named Deepthi.

== Work life ==
After completing his post graduation, he joined as a sub-editor in Eenadu in Tirupati. After having worked there for a year and half, he shifted to Hyderabad. He joined Udayam, a daily newspaper launched by Dasari Narayana Rao. During this period, he started writing an anthology of short stories named Pachanaaku Saakshiga. Later, he joined Andhra Jyothi upon an invite from ABK Prasad. After 8 months, he started working in Tirupati edition of Andhrajyothi and shifted to his hometown, Mittoor. During his tenure as weekly editor of the Andhra Jyothi, he got into controversy for having published a long story Ravana Josyam, by D.R. Indra. Though he received physical threats and faced intimidation from some sections of people, he went ahead and published two parts of the three-series story.

== Literary works ==
Namini has written his first story while he was in first year of post graduation. It was inspired from the incident he encountered while travelling in a bus. He sent it to Andhra Prabha but it was returned to him unpublished. His autobiographical sketch, Pachanaaku Saakshiga about the hardship he underwent in his childhood, depicted with a sense of humor in typical Rayalaseema accent, is lauded as his best work. Mittoorodi Pustakam is a compilation of some of his stories in one. Illustrations have been done by Bapu. Namini Iskoolu Pustakam is also a compilation of his books like Pillala Bhashalo Algebra, Iskoolu pilakayala katha and others. His style of writing, he says, has been inspired from small town people, their lives, conversations and his relation with them. Namini received wide appreciation for his writing from the likes of P.V. Narasimha Rao and Bapu. He also writes articles for various newspapers and some of his recent stories got published in Kinige.

He has started a publishing house by the name "Tom Sawyer publications", based in Tirupati. He has published Kollo Jaga, Mittoorodi Pustakam and Moolintaame under this publication.

== Books ==
- Mittoorodi Kathalu
- Sinabba Kathalu
- Munikannadi Sedyam
- Pachanaaku Saakshiga
- Number One Pudingi (2011)
- Namini Iskoolu Pustakam (2010)
- Pala Podugu
- Chaduvula Chaavula
- Mittoorodi Pustakam (2013)
- Moolintaame (2014)
- Kollo Jaga (2017)
