= T. Ramaswamy Choudary =

Indian lawyer and social reformer (1887–1943)

Tripuraneni Ramaswamy
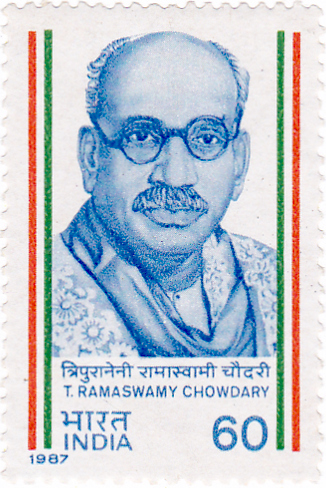
- Tripuraneni Ramaswamy on a 1987 stamp of India
- Born: 15 January 1887; Angaluru, Krishna district
- Died: 16 January 1943 (aged 56); Tenali
- Citizenship: India
- Education: Bar at Law
- Alma mater: Noble College, Machilipatnam; Dublin University, Ireland
- Spouse: Punnamma
- Children: Tripuraneni Gopichand, Tripuraneni Gokul Chand, Chouda Rani
- Relatives: Pitcheswara Rao Atluri
- Writing career
- Genres: Lawyer, Playwright, Poet, Avadhanam
- Notable work: Kurukshetra Sangramam
- Website: blog.anilatluri.com/2005/12/85

Tripuraneni Ramaswamy (1887–1943), also known as Tripuraneni Ramaswamy, was a lawyer, poet, playwright and reformer active among the Telugu-speaking people. He was popularly known as Kaviraju (the "king of poets"), a title given to him by the Andhra Mahasabha in 1929.

Ramaswamy was part of a growing movement in India to reassess the culture of India. This movement included such people as Ram Mohan Roy, Ishwar Chandra Vidyasagar, Ranade, Dayananda Saraswati, Kandukuri Veeresalingam and Gurazada Apparao.

== Childhood and early years ==
Ramaswamy was born in the village of Angaluru in the Krishna District (present-day Andhra Pradesh) into a family of farmers. At the age of 23, he passed his Matriculation Examination. In the same year Ramaswamy wrote two plays: Karempudi Kadanam, based on the Palanadu battle, and Kurukshetra Sangramam, based on the Mahabharata war. In 1911, Ramaswamy joined the Noble College at Bandar to study for the Intermediate Course. In those years he displayed his literary skills and prodigious memory in his Avadhanam.

In 1914, Ramaswamy went to Britain and studied law as well as English Literature and modern European culture in Dublin. During this time, Ramaswamy wrote to Krishna Patrika, a Telugu weekly appealing to Indians to support the Home Rule movement started by Annie Besant. He pleaded for India's independence. Ramaswamy wrote many patriotic songs during the independence movement.

After returning to India, Ramaswamy practiced law for some years, mostly in Tenali town. However, his main activity was directed towards social reforms. He launched a full-scale attack on casteism and the social injustices resulting from it.

== Literary career and public life ==
Ramaswamy chose literary writing as the vehicle for expressing his rationalist thoughts, and he worked with his close friend Unnava Lakshminarayana, who was a renowned Telugu Brahmin Brahmo leader.

His poetic work Kuppuswamy Satakam reveals the theme of social revolution and talks about social evils, blind faith and indignity to man. In his other works such as Sambhukavadha, Suthapuranam, Dhoortha maanava, Khooni, Bhagavadgita, Rana Pratap and Kondaveeti pathanam, Ramaswamy made a rational analysis of dogmas prescribed by ancient classics and the injustice these dogmas did to people belonging to the lower social orders. Moreover, Ramaswamy attacked discriminatory practices and fought against the idea of untouchability.

Ramaswamy was against the traditional Hindu marriage ceremony which resulted in burdensome expenditure, especially among the poor. He prepared a simple procedure in Telugu called Vivaha Vidhi. He officiated at many marriages.

Ramaswamy was a patriot even when he was a student. He wrote a patriotic play Rana Pratap, which was proscribed by the British government. He was an ardent lover of the Telugu language and culture and was proud of their history. He was an educationist and was a member of the senate of the Andhra University for three terms. Ramaswamy was awarded many honors and was popularly known as 'Kaviraju', a title conferred on him.

The Indian government issued a commemorative postage stamp with his picture in 1987, his centenary year.

== Children ==
Among his children were Tripuraneni Gopichand, who left his own mark on the Telugu literature. Ramaswamy's grandson and Gopichand's son, Sai Chand is an actor in Telugu film industry.

== Bibliography ==
- Ramaswamy Tripuraneni (1887–1943), Luminaries of 20th Century, Part 2, Potti Sreeramulu Telugu University, Hyderabad, 2005, pp: 552–3.
- Ramaswamy, Uma (March 1978), "The Belief System of the Non-Brahmin Movement in India: The Andhra Case", Asian Survey, 18 (3): 290–300, doi:10.2307/2643221, JSTOR 2643221
- Keiko, Yamada (2008), "Politics and representation of caste identity in regional historiography: A case study of Kammas in Andhra", The Indian Economic and Social History Review, 45 (3): 353–380, doi:10.1177/001946460804500302, S2CID 145663799
