= Ranade =

Ranade is a family name, common among the Chitpavan Brahmin community in Western Maharashtra, India.

Ranade family originated from Bhatgaon, Guhagar Ratnagiri.[2]

Each year Ranade family celebrates Mahashivratri utsav at Asud, Vyaghreshwar Near Dapoli, Ratnagiri [3].

== Notable people ==
Notable people with the surname include:

- Mahadev Govind Ranade (1842–1901) – Indian scholar, social reformer and author
- Ramabai Ranade (1862–1924) – Indian women's rights activist, Mahadev Ranade's wife
- Ramachandra Dattatrya Ranade (1886–1957) – scholar of Indian philosophy
- Eknath Ranade (1914–1982) – Indian activist
- Mohan Ranade (born 1929) – Indian freedom fighter
- Piyush Ranade (born 1983) – Indian television and film actor
- Sadashiv Ranade (1912–?) – Indian biographer, historian and genealogist
