= Devasthanam (film) =

- Poster
- Directed by: Janardhana Maharshi
- Written by: Janardhana Maharshi
- Produced by: Ammanni Narayan; Sravani; Sarvani; Janardhana Maharshi
- Starring: S. P. Balasubrahmanyam; Aamani; K. Vishwanath; Dr. K. V. Ramanachary
- Cinematography: V. N. Suresh Kumar
- Edited by: K. Ramesh
- Music by: Swara Veenapani
- Distributed by: Sarvejana Sukhino Bhavantu Films
- Release date: 13 April 2012
- Running time: 116 minutes
- Language: Telugu

Devasthanam (transl. Temple) is a 2012 Indian Telugu-language musical drama film directed by Janardhana Maharshi. It stars S. P. Balasubrahmanyam, Aamani and K. Viswanath.

== Plot ==
Srimannarayana is a trustee of a local Hindu temple in Chittoor who helps and loves everyone, addressing all as "bangaru" (lit. 'gold', used as an affectionate nickname in Telugu culture), and treats the temple as his home. He regularly clarifies the philosophical doubts of a young girl (Niharika) who regularly visits the temple. One day he happens to see an orphan whose dead body is left on the street and is them cremated with garbage in an incinerator. That incident shatters his peace and he starts panicking about how will he be cremated as he is an orphan too. On the other hand, Samba Murthy is a middle aged man who is a cunning salesman in a big saree store. He leads a simple but happy life with his wife Saraswathi. The couple love each other and live happily even though they have no children, with Samba Murthy in particular being a romantic who likes to write poetry. Samba Murthy wants to learn classical dance to lose weight from the dance teacher in the temple but continually postpones it.

One day Srimannarayana happens to see Samba Murthy and his odd but sincere devotional practices as well as his interest in dance. Impressed with Samba Murthy's attitude, Srimannarayana approaches him and requests he light his pyre and perform his funeral rituals after his death. Shocked and furious, Samba Murthy tells him that he will think about it and angrily leaves. The next morning, Srimannarayana directly comes to Samba Murthy's home for an answer. Samba Murthy asks Saraswathi to lie that he is not home and manages to send Srimannarayana back. From then, Srimannarayana follows Samba Murthy everywhere, who tries to avoid him. Saraswathi convinces Samba Murthy that it is another chance given to him by God and reminds him of his grief that he couldn't conduct the last rites for his father because he was stuck in Bombay during the bombings. Samba Murthy finally accepts Srimannarayana's wish. In return. he gives rupees two lakhs for his funeral expenses, including flights to Kasi for immersing his ashes in the Ganga. He tells Samba and Saraswathi that he will visit them every morning and if he did not arrive any day, it means he is no more.

Samba Murthy learns from the temple priest that Srimannarayana is a great artist who used to perform Harikatha but stopped for some reason. Samba Murthy promises the priest to arrange Srimannarayana's performance for Dasara celebrations. Srimannarayana accepts on the condition that Samba Murthy himself must write the script and modernise the art. After studying previous Harikatha and revising it based on Srimannarayana's criticism, Samba Murthy's script is finally accepted. From then, they perform Harikatha everyday at the temple based on current issues and answer philosophical questions afterwards. After watching a performance, lawyer Purushottama Rao, invites both of them home and how to attain peace. He confesses that he has earned lot of money by undertaking false cases and he is not happy with that money anymore and wishes to get rid of all his sins now. Upon the advice of Srimannarayana, Purushottama Rao sacrifices all his wealth, transforms himself into a good man and starts a new trust called "Sarve Jana Sukhinobhavanthu" to fund the art of Harikatha. He requests Srimannarayana and Samba Murthy to be trustees of the foundation. Surprised and inspired by his change, Samba Murthy returns Srimannarayana's money to him saying that he now realised how lucky he is to find an elderly person like Srimannarayana as his guide. Srimannarayana donates those 2 lakhs to the trust saying that he was so foolish about his cremation on who performs his last rituals but is not concerned about it anymore. They both become great companions and perform Harikatha across the land for temples, schools, orphanages, jails and others they feel can benefit from their message. One day, however, Samba Murthy wakes up with major pain and ending up dying before Saraswathi's eyes after uttering his final words. Srimannarayana arrives to the scene, and the roles are reversed as Srimannarayana conducts the last rites for Samba Murthy. The film ends with a message that "life is a stage. Nothing remains forever except good deeds."

== Cast ==
- S. P. Balasubrahmanyam as Samba Murthy
- Aamani as Saraswathi
- K. Viswanath as Srimannarayana
- Dr. K. V. Ramanachary IAS as Lawyer Purushottama Rao
- Kovai Sarala as Sridevi
- Nayar Raman as the temple priest
- P. Hari Prasadarao
- M. Murali
- Sandhya Raju as the classical dance teacher in the temple
- Saraswathi Pradeep as the violinist for Harikatha
- Niharika as the devotee in temple

== Soundtrack ==
Devasthanam

Soundtrack album by Swara Veenapani
- Released: 31 Dec 2011
- Genre: Feature film soundtrack
- Length: 36:30
- Language: Telugu
- Label: Leo Music Company
- Producer: Swara Veenapani

The soundtrack of the film was composed by Swara Veenapani. The audio was launched on 31 Dec 2011 under Leo Music Company label.

Tracklist
No.	Title	Lyrics	Artist(s)	Length
1.	"Paluku Thelupu Thallive"	Swaraveenapani	S. P. Balasubrahmanyam, K. S. Chithra	03:33
2.	"Sambayya"	Swaraveenapani	S. P. Balasubrahmanyam, K. S. Chithra	04:13
3.	"Snehama"	Swaraveenapani	Sri Krishna	05:33
4.	"Devasthanam"	Swaraveenapani	S. P. Balasubrahmanyam, K. S. Chithra, Saiveena	03:49
5.	"Gananuthi (Harikatha)"	Sri Dhandi Bhatla Narayanamurthy	S. P. Balasubrahmanyam	05:22
6.	"Theliyaledhura"	Swaraveenapani	Sri Krishna, Pranavi, Sai Sankeerthi, Koundinya	04:21
7.	"Gananatha (Harikatha)"	Sri Dhandi Bhatla Narayanamurthy	S. P. Balasubrahmanyam	06:08
8.	"Paluku Thelupu Thallive"	Swaraveenapani	S. P. Balasubrahmanyam	03:31
Total length:				36:30

== Reception ==
A critic from The Times of India rated the film three out of five stars and wrote that "The movie is well-intentioned alright but lacks creative integrity in its construction. The writing though profound and witty doesn’t exactly leave you enlightened so to say. Add to it the feel of a home video, very basic." A critic from Full Hyderabad wrote that "Devastham must particularly be watched by those of our elderly who worry about how death will knock at their doors, and about the dignity of dying."
