= Kanuparti Varalakshmamma =

K. Varalakshamma
- Born: Kanuparthi Varalakshamma; October 6, 1896; Bapatla, British India
- Died: August 6, 1978 (aged 81)
- Occupation: activist
- Spouse: Hanumantha Rao

Kanuparthi Varalakshmamma (1896–1978) was an activist of the Indian Freedom Movement.

== Life sketch ==
Varalakshmamma was born to Palaparthi Seshayya and Hanumayamma on 6 October 1896 in Bapatla, one of seven boys and three girls. She married Kanuparthi Hanumantha Rao in 1909. Her husband supported in her activities wholeheartedly, as stated by of Varalakshmamma by Polapragada Rajyalakshmi in her Biography of Kanuparti Varalakshmamma (Sahitya Akademi).

Starting at the age of 12, she was involved in the Indian freedom movement and a follower of Mahatma Gandhi. She worked towards improving the lot of women and encouraged them to actively participate in the freedom movement. She died on 13 August 1978.

== Literary and social activities ==
Varalakshmamma started her literary career with a series of articles in 1920, under a running title, Maa Chettuneeda Muchatlu, (Chatting in the shade of our tree), published in the Andhra Patrika weekly. In this column, Varalakshmamma discussed important issues such as education for women, traditions, politics and current trends in various areas. The popular column ran for six years.

In 1928 Veralakshmamma started a column in the new magazine, Gruhalakshmi. Her new column, Sarada Lekhalu (శారద లేఖలు)(Letters from Sarada) was under the pseudonym Sarada. The letters were addressed to an imaginary friend, Kalpalata. In these letters, Varalakshmamma discussed issues such as the Sarda Act, divorce law, the khadi movement, non-cooperation, erasing untouchability, unfounded customs, physical exercise, the changes implemented in measurements and weights and microphones.

She started a women's organization, Stree Hitaishini Mandali to promote women's education, vocational skills and to improve their social status.

Varalakshmamma wrote poetry, stories, novels, and plays. Her writings were broadcast on All India Radio and Doordarshan (India TV). She participated in literary meets with high-ranking poets of the time. Varalakshmamma's first novel Vasumati was published in 1925. Her second novel, Viswamitra was published in 1933.

Some of her stories are Kuteeralakshmi (The Goddess in a Cottage), Penshanu Puccukunna Naati Raatri (The night after retirement), Katha Etla Undaale (What is a good story!) and Aidu Maasamula Iruvadi Dinamulu (Five months and twenty days).

== External sources ==
- Rajyalakshmi, Polapragada.(200) Kanuparthi Varalakshmamma. New Delhi: Sahitya Akademi.
- Varalakshmamma. Kuteeralakshmi, translated into English.
- Comprehensive article on Varalakshmamma
- A comprehensive article on Varalakshmamma in Telugu
