= Perugu Ramakrishna =

Indian poet and writer (born 1960)

- Born: 27 May 1960; Nellore, India
- Occupations: Indian poet and writer

Perugu Ramakrishna (born 27 May 1960) is an Indian poet and writer. He has written 4 books of poetry and 2 books of short-stories. He is the recipient of Rabindranath Tagore Memorial Literary Honour from Motivational Strips, the world’s most active writers forum. He wrote a long poem in English named Flemingo.

== Awards ==
- Rabindranath Tagore Memorial Literary Honour 2022 from Motivational Strips, the world's most active writers forum
- UWA Outstanding intellectual of 21st Century Award, Chennai
- Ranjani-Kundurthi National Award
- Hyderabad and Millennium X-Ray National Award, Vijayawada.
