= Kavana Sarma =

Indian writer

- Born: Kandula Varaha Narasimha Sarma; September 23, 1939; India
- Died: October 25, 2018
- Occupations: Professor of civil engineering, writer
- Writing career
- Language: Telugu
- Genres: Satire, fiction
- Notable works: Science Nadachina Baata, Sangha Puranam, Spruha, Ame Illu, Vidaakulu

Kandula Varaha Narasimha Sarma known in Telugu literary circles as Kavana Sarma (23 September 1939 – 25 October 2018). was an Indian professor of civil engineering who was also a novelist and writer of Telugu fiction. He retired from the Indian Institute of Science, Bangalore and served as an advisor to Rachana Masa Patrika.

In his essay, "Political and Social Reality in Telugu Fiction", Prof. V. V. S. Sarma says "Kavana Sarma probably is the only Telugu fiction writer who wrote satirical stories concerning Ph.D. dissertations, brain drain, scientific conferences, science academies etc."

In an interview to The Hindu, Metroplus, Visakhapatnam, Kavana Sarma said that he started writing at the age of 14, and that he is an 'eternally curious person'.

== Writings ==
On 16 October 2007 The Hindu listed Science Nadachina Baata (The Path that Science Walked) by Kavana Sarma in its list of New Arrivals.

Kavana Sarma's Sangha Puranam (The Story of Organizations), later published as Vyangya Kavanalu is classed under Telugu satire.(Sahitya Akademi's Encyclopedia of Indian Literature)

Sarojini Premachand writes "In his story "Spruha", Kavana Sarma skillfully depicts how young boys and girls are conditioned mainly by mothers using very subtle methods to conform to gender, class and caste boundaries prevailing in society. This story, told from a school boy's angle, is good material to include in children's literature."

The editorial of the Aug 2007 issue of Literary Voices of India says "In 'Ame Illu', (Her Home) Kavana Sarma explores the concept of what constitutes a home through the eyes of a middle aged housewife who shocks her family and friends by deciding to take up a job and move into a cramped rented accommodation. Why? Because her husband made it clear that the home she thought was theirs was his alone and she lived there on his terms. Sarma's narration is matter-of-fact, free of rancor or melodrama, portraying the heroine as a good natured, practical woman seeking personal independence rather than an activist fighting for a social cause. 'Literary Voices of India' were commended by the writer Sri Sarma for this translation."

The editorial of the March 2008 issue of Literary Voices of India says "Divorce (Vidaakulu) by Kavana Sarma is the story of a young woman seeking to divorce her husband in the face of tremendous family and societal disapproval. Her grounds for divorce are considered frivolous and selfish. Non-Indian readers will find the ritual of a one-sided speed dating, where the boy has all the power to "choose" a bride from the many young women presented for his approval by eager parents, amusing and horrifying, while Indian readers might find it par for the course. The conflict between personal goals and the outdated, gender based expectations experienced by many young women is not a new theme. But the context of the Y2K flood of software engineers in the United States who import highly qualified brides from India to perform domestic drudgery while holding down well-paying jobs, gives it a contemporary twist. An original translation by Literary Voices of India".
