= Abburi Chayadevi =

Telugu writer (1933–2019)

Abburi Chayadevi (1933–2019) was a Telugu Indian fiction writer. She won the Sahitya Akademi Award in 2005 for Tana Margam.

== Biography ==
Chayadevi was born 13 October 1933 in Rajahmundry, India.

Chayadevi was active in literary circles since the fifties and even in her 70s, was still known as a creative feminist writer. She was born in a brahmin family She also translated German fiction. Her stories have been translated into English and Spanish besides many Indian languages. She served as librarian at the Jawaharlal Nehru University, New Delhi in the sixties.

She was a council member of Kendra Sahitya Akademi (1998-2002).

Chayadevi's husband, Abburi Varadarajeswara Rao, was a writer, critic and former Chairman of the Official Languages Commission.

She was also the daughter-in-law of Abburi Ramakrishna Rao, a pioneer of the romantic first and later the progressive literary movement.

Chayadevi died 28 June 2019 in Hyderabad, Telangana.

== Works ==
- Anaga Anaga (folk stories for children)
- Abburi Chaya Devi Kathalu (short stories), 1991
- Mrityunjaya (long story), 1993
- Tana Margam (short stories-about the exploitation of women in the guise of family bonds).
- Mana Jeevithalu-Jiddu Krishnamurti Vyakhyanalu–3 (Translated)
- Parichita Lekha published as an anthology (Translation of stories by Austrian writer Stefan Zweig)
- Bonsai Batukulu [Bonsai Lives] portrays the life of women who live mechanically under the control of family members. Conclusion

== Awards ==
- Ranganayakamma Pratibha Puraskaram, 2003
- Telugu University Award, 1996
- Sahitya Akademi Award in Telugu for the Year 2005
