= Abburu, Andhra Pradesh =

Abburu
- Village
- Interactive map of Abburu
- Location in Andhra Pradesh, India
- Coordinates: 16°26′42″N 80°10′3″E
- Country: India
- State: Andhra Pradesh
- District: Palnadu
- Mandal: Sattenapalle

Government
  - Type: Panchayati raj
  - Body: Abburu gram panchayat

Area
  - Total: 1,206 ha (2,980 acres)

Population (2011)
  - Total: 4,100
  - Density: 340/km^{2} (880/sq mi)

Languages
  - Official: Telugu
- Time zone: UTC+5:30 (IST)
- PIN: 522xxx
- Area code: +91–8640
- Vehicle registration: AP

Abburu is a village in Palnadu district of the Indian state of Andhra Pradesh. It is located in Sattenapalle mandal of Guntur revenue division.

== Governance ==
Abburu gram panchayat is the local self-government of the village. It is divided into wards and each ward is represented by a ward member. The elected members of the gram panchayat is headed by a sarpanch. The village forms a part of Andhra Pradesh Capital Region and is under the jurisdiction of APCRDA.
