= Mutnuri Krishna Rao =

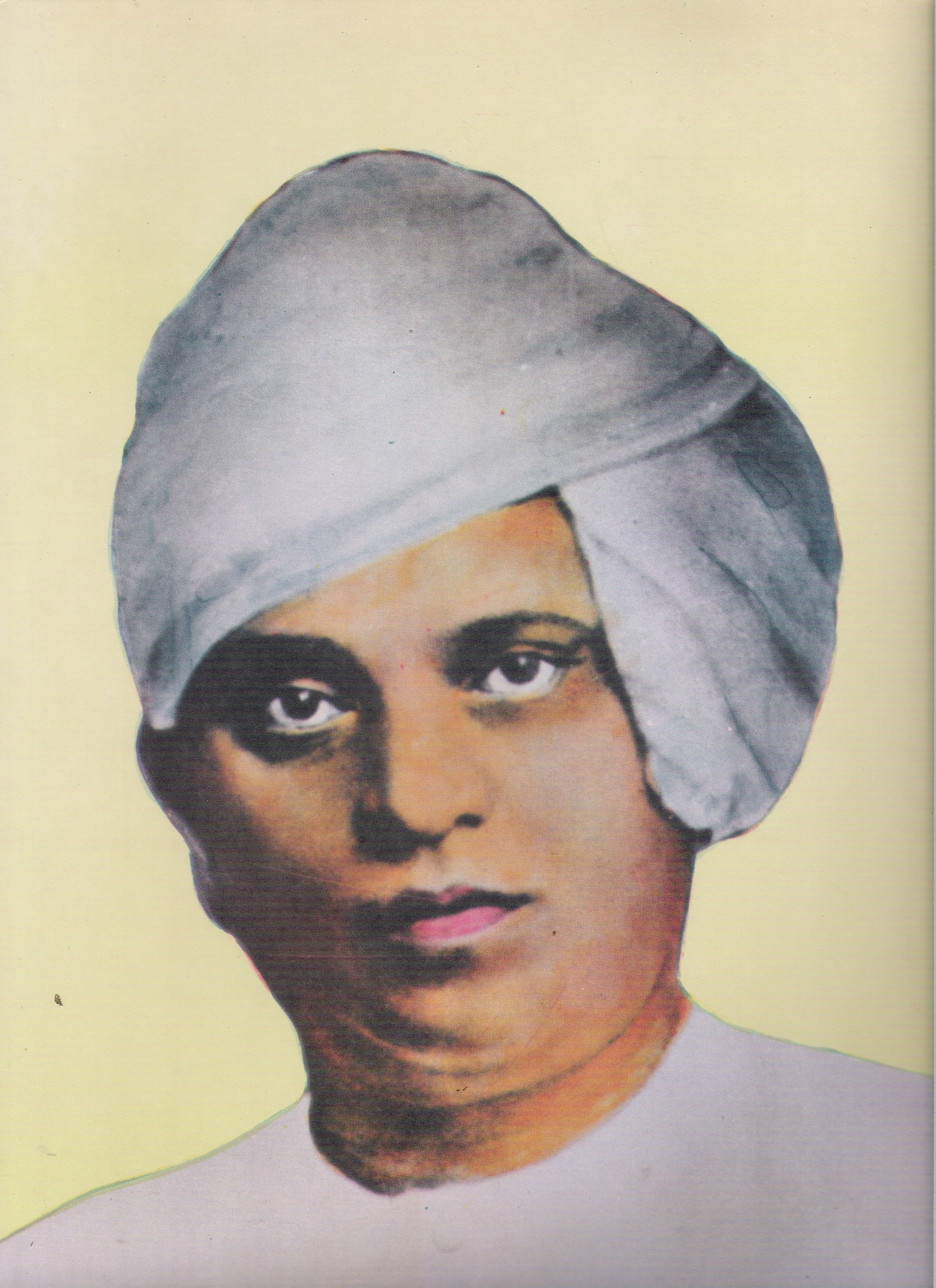
- Born: 1879; Mutnuru village, Divi Taluk, Krishna district, Madras Presidency
- Died: 25 June 1945 (aged 65–66)
- Occupations: editor, freedom fighter
- Children: Two daughters, one son

Mutnuri Krishna Rao was an Indian freedom fighter, editor, scholar and literary critic. He was the editor of Krishna Patrika, a nationalist publication from 1907 to 1945. He is considered to be the doyen of Telugu journalism.

== Biography ==
Krishna Rao was born in a Brahmin family in 1879 in Mutnuru village of Divi taluk, Krishna district of erstwhile Madras Presidency. He lost his parents when he was very young. His father was a district munsif. He was brought up by his paternal uncle. He completed his primary education in Hindu high school, Bandar. He studied F. A. course in Noble college, Bandar. Raghupathi Venkataratnam Naidu was one of his teachers. Rao was influenced by his ideology and used to attend the meetings of Brahmo Samaj.

Later he went to Madras to study B. A. in Christian College. He got acquainted with Pattabhi Sitaramayya. As he focused more on literature, he returned to Bandar in 1903 without completing his degree. Inspired by Vande Mataram movement, he toured Bengal along with Bipin Chandra Pal in 1906.

Rao lived with his wife. The couple had two daughters and a son. The eldest daughter and only son passed away before him, and his second daughter became a widow.

== Career ==
He joined Krishna Patrika as an assistant editor. He got promoted as an editor in 1907 and worked there until his death in 1945. He criticized the policies of British government in his editorials regarding the amount spent on welfare of the poor and developing educational institutions. He also ran a Magazine called Andhra Bharati for some time.

== Death and legacy ==
He died on 25 June 1945 because of Ascites. The town hall in Machilipatnam is named after him.

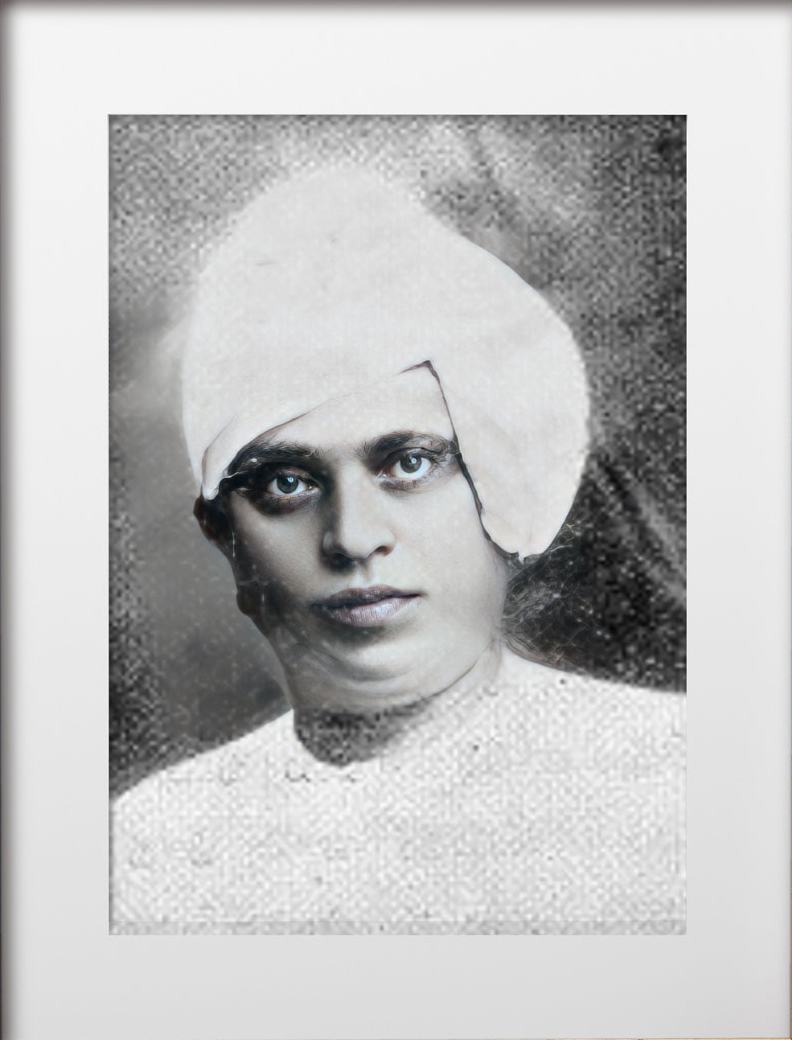
Mutnuri Krishna Rao, Editor, Krishna Patrika

The Telugu Teachers Association of Andhra Pradesh and Telangana marked the birth anniversary of Mutnuri Krishna Rao on November 18, 2022. It was intended to teach students about Mutnuri Krishna Rao's 1945 contributions through Krishna Patrika as well as the broader role played by journalists in the Indian independence movement.
