= Tripuraneni Gopichand =

Indian writer

- త్రిపురనేని గోపీచంద్
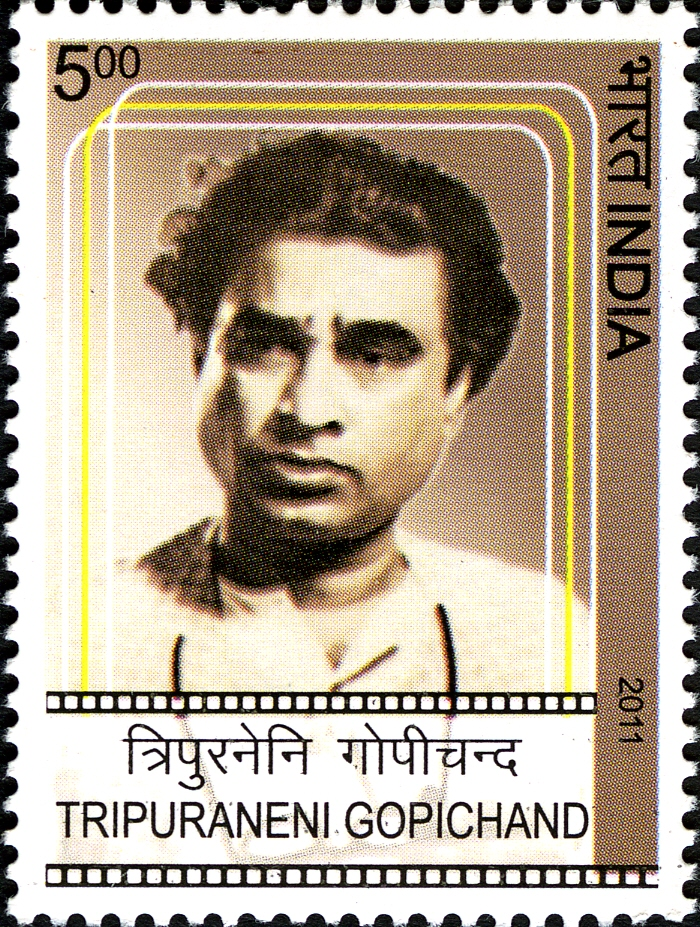
- Tripuraneni Gopichand
- Born: 8 September 1910; Angaluru, Krishna district, India
- Died: 2 November 1962 (aged 52)
- Education: Law
- Occupations: Novelist; short story writer; essayist; playwright; editor; film director
- Spouse: Sakuntala devi
- Father: Tripuraneni Ramaswamy
- Children: 5; including Sai Chand
- Relatives: Pitcheswara Rao Atluri
- Writing career
- Pen name: Tripuraneni Gopichand
- Notable works: Pandita Parameswara Sastri Veelunama; Asamardhuni Jivayatra (1947)

Tripuraneni Gopichand (8 September 1910 – 2 November 1962) was a Telugu short story writer, novelist, editor, essayist, playwright, film director, and a radical humanist.

== Biography ==
Gopichand was the son of renowned social reformer and play writer Tripuraneni Ramaswamy. Gopichand, inspired by M.N.Roy's Radical Humanism, became the first state secretary of the Radical Democratic Party (India) Andhra Pradesh. His second novel Asamardhuni Jivayatra (Bungler: A Journey Through Life), was the first psychological novel in Telugu literature. Gopichand was posthumously awarded the Sahitya Akademi Award for Pandita Parameswara Sastri Veelunama in 1963, the first Telugu novel to win this award. His novels typically features gloomy, incomplete, unsatisfied and unsatisfying protagonist tortured by a sense of guilt.

His novel "Asamardhuni Jeeva Yatra", is part of the syllabus for APPSC examinations in Telugu literature as an optional subject.

A postal stamp in his honour was released by the Government of India on his 100th birthday.

== Bibliography ==
=== Novels ===
- Parivartanam
- Asamardhuni Jivayatra (first psychoanalysis novel in Telugu)
- Merupula Marakalu
- Pandita Parameswara Sastry Veelunaama
- Yamapasam
- Cheekati Gadulu
- Sidhilalayam
- Gadiya Padani Talupulu
- Gatinchanigatam
- Pillatemmera
- Premopahatulu

=== Non-fiction ===
- Tatvavettalu
- Postu Chaiyani Uttarulu
- Maku Unnayi Swagataalu
- Vubhayakusalopari

== Filmography ==
- Chaduvukunna Ammayilu (1963) (Dialogues)
- Dharmadevatha (1952) (Dialogues)
- Priyuralu (1952) (Story, Dialogues and Direction)
- Perantalu (1951) (Director)
- Lakshmamma (1950) (Director)
- Gruhapravesam (1946) (Story)
- Raithubidda (1939) (Dialogues)
