= Krishnarajanagara =

- Town
- Location in Karnataka, India Krishnarajanagara (India)
- Coordinates: 12°26′14″N 76°22′50″E
- Country: India
- State: Karnataka
- District: Mysore
- Taluk: Krishnarajanagara
- Yadathore: 1934
- Founder: Krishnaraja Wodeyar IV

Government
  - Body: Town Municipal Council

Area
  - Town: 8.6 km^{2} (3.3 sq mi)
  - Rural: 596.02 km^{2} (230.12 sq mi)
- Elevation: 786 m (2,579 ft)

Population (2011)
  - Town: 35,805
  - Density: 4,200/km^{2} (11,000/sq mi)
  - Rural: 216,852

Languages
  - Official: Kannada
- Time zone: UTC+5:30 (IST)
- PIN: 571602
- Telephone code: 08223
- Vehicle registration: KA-45, KA-09, KA-55
- Website: krnagaratown.mrc.gov.in

Krishnarajanagara is a town and taluk in Mysore district in the Indian state of Karnataka. It is approximately 41.1km from Mysore city .

== Geography ==
Krishnarajanagara is located on the northern part of Mysore district, west of the Krishna Raja Sagara Reservoir. It has an average elevation of 786 metres above sea level. NH-373, also known as SH-57 passes through the town of K.R.Nagara.

== Climate ==
Krishnarajanagara has Tropical Savanna Climate under the Köppen climate classification. On average, the town receives the least amount of rainfall in January, and the most in October.

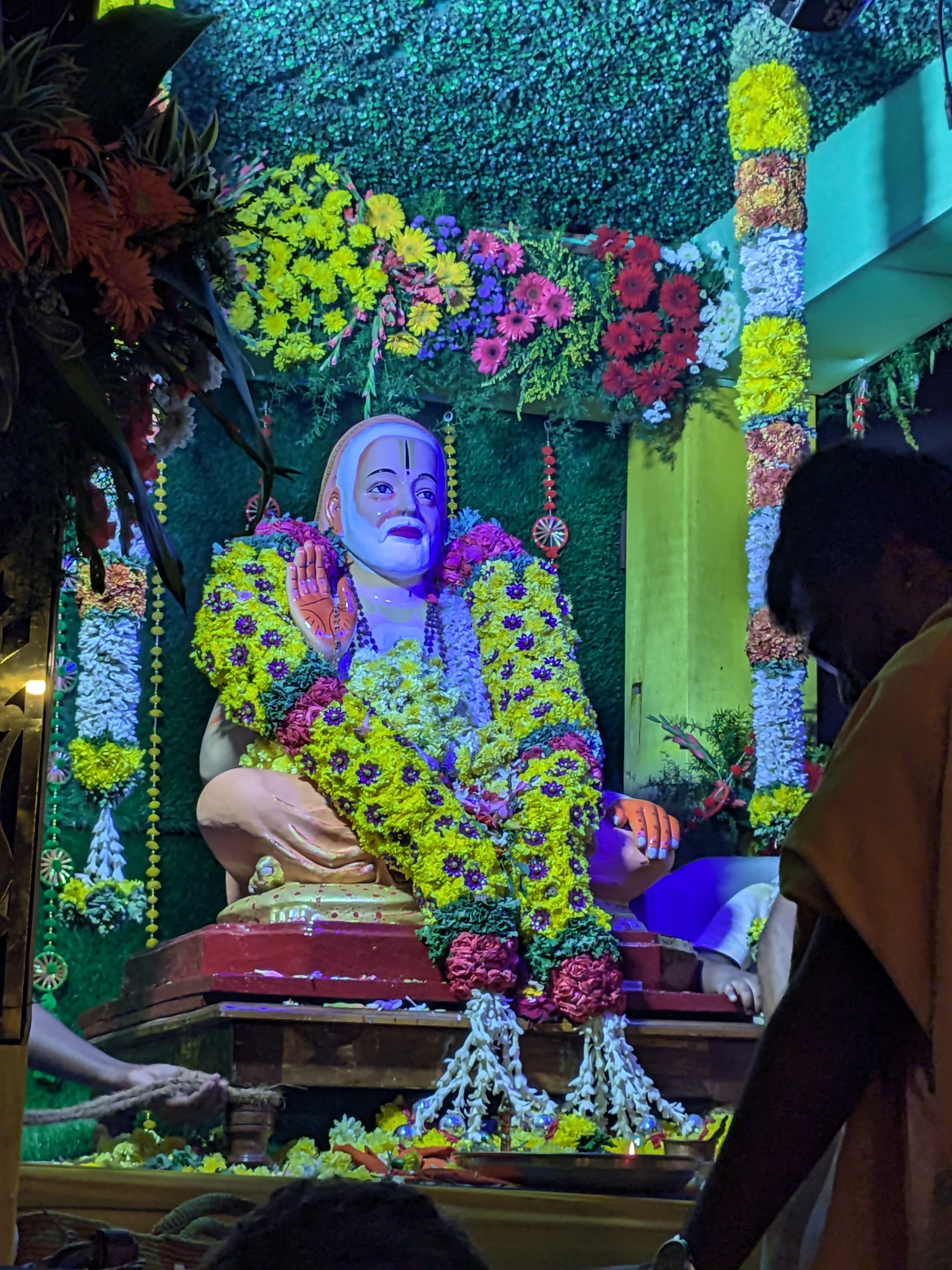
C.M.road Raghavendra Tirtha Event last day Picture 28/11/2024

Climate data for Krishnarajanagara
Month	Jan	Feb	Mar	Apr	May	Jun	Jul	Aug	Sep	Oct	Nov	Dec	Year
Mean daily maximum °C (°F)	28 (82)	30.2 (86.4)	32.4 (90.3)	32.7 (90.9)	30.8 (87.4)	26.7 (80.1)	25.5 (77.9)	25.7 (78.3)	26.8 (80.2)	26.8 (80.2)	26.3 (79.3)	26.5 (79.7)	28.2 (82.7)
Daily mean °C (°F)	21.8 (71.2)	23.7 (74.7)	25.9 (78.6)	26.4 (79.5)	25.3 (77.5)	23 (73)	22.3 (72.1)	22.2 (72.0)	22.6 (72.7)	22.5 (72.5)	21.8 (71.2)	21.1 (70.0)	23.2 (73.8)
Mean daily minimum °C (°F)	15.8 (60.4)	17.4 (63.3)	19.7 (67.5)	21.6 (70.9)	21.6 (70.9)	20.8 (69.4)	20.4 (68.7)	20.1 (68.2)	19.8 (67.6)	19.2 (66.6)	17.8 (64.0)	16.1 (61.0)	19.2 (66.5)
Average rainfall mm (inches)	3 (0.1)	4 (0.2)	11 (0.4)	48 (1.9)	106 (4.2)	129 (5.1)	126 (5.0)	106 (4.2)	99 (3.9)	151 (5.9)	70 (2.8)	20 (0.8)	873 (34.5)
Source: Climate-Data.org

== Demographics ==
According to the 2011 India census, Krishnarajanagara had a population of 35,805. Its gender ratio is relatively balanced, with 17,900 male residents and 17,905 female residents. Krishnarajanagara has an average literacy rate of 78.2%. with male literacy being 81.8%, and female literacy being 74.5%. In Krishnarajanagara, 9.9% of the population is under 6 years of age.

== Galleries ==
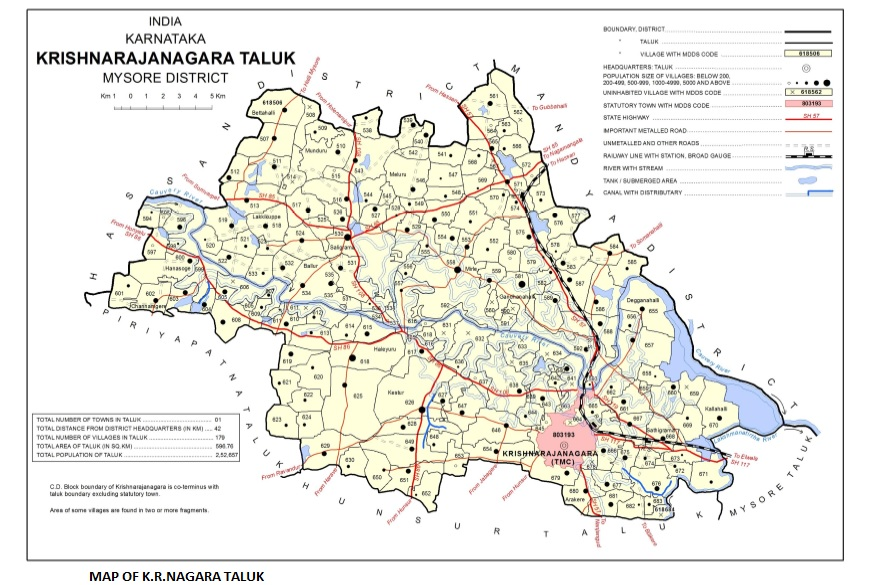
Taluk boundary before creation of Saligrama Taluk

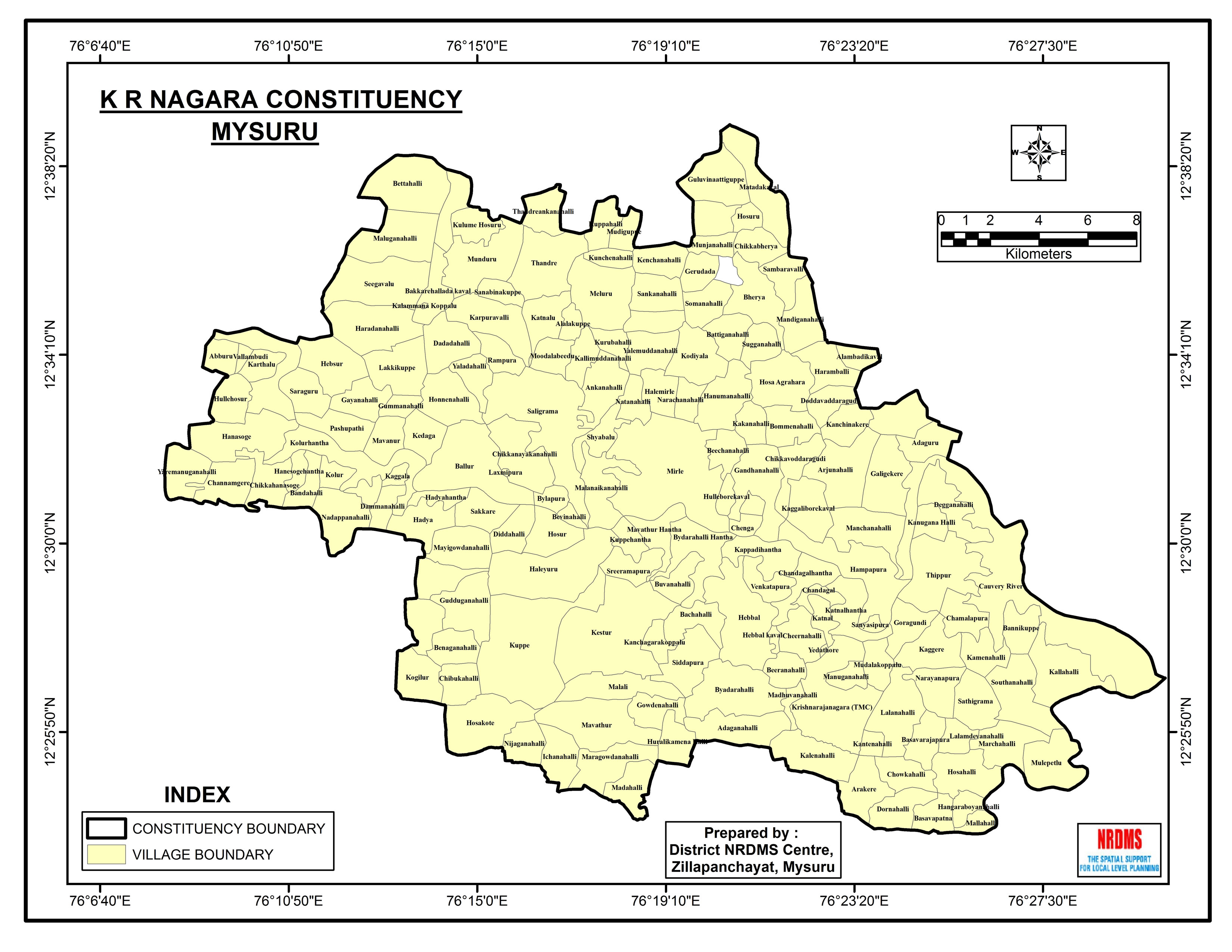
Taluk boundary same as Assembly Constituency as per 2011 Census before creation of Saligrama Taluk

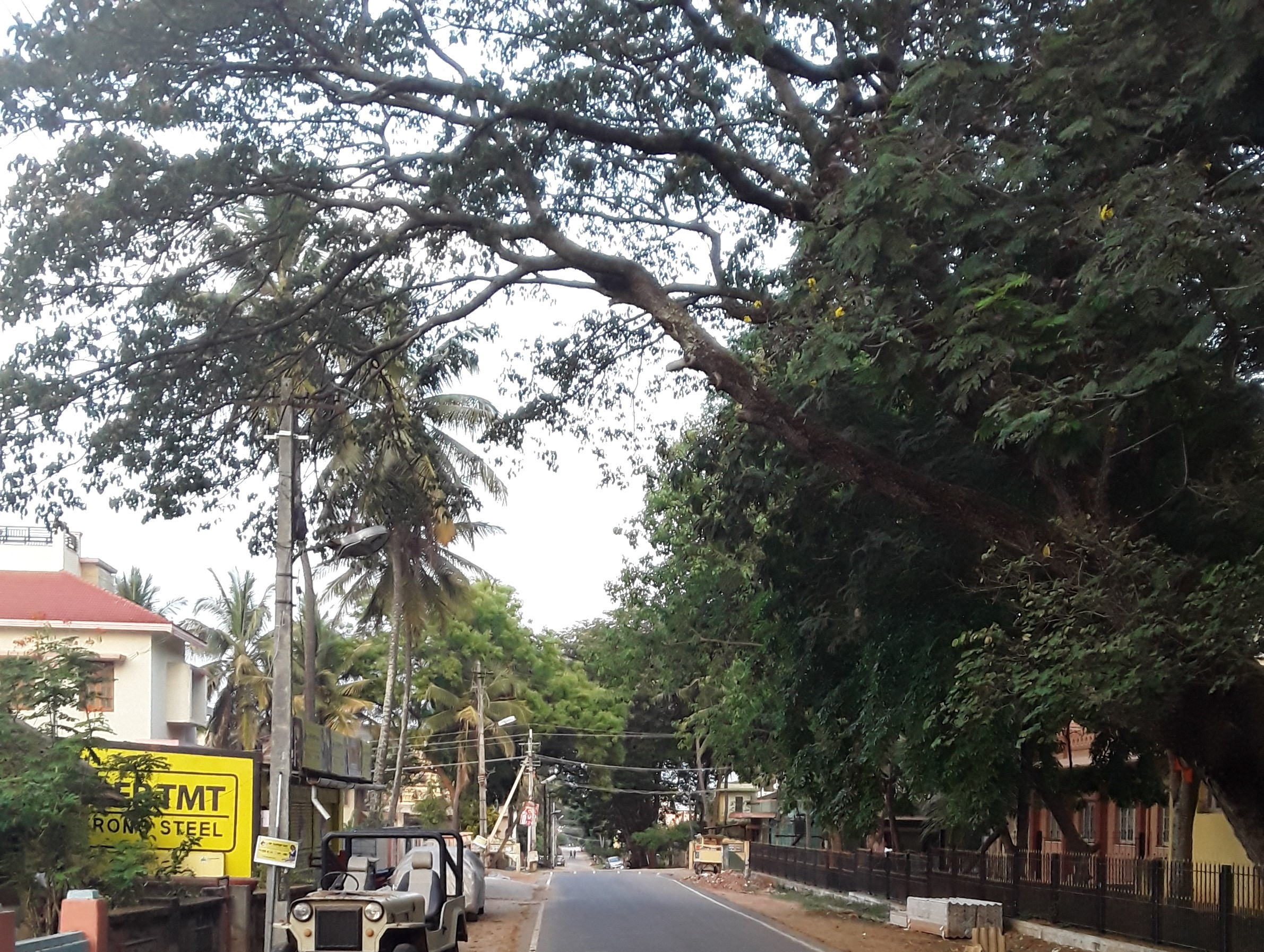
C.M. Road within the town

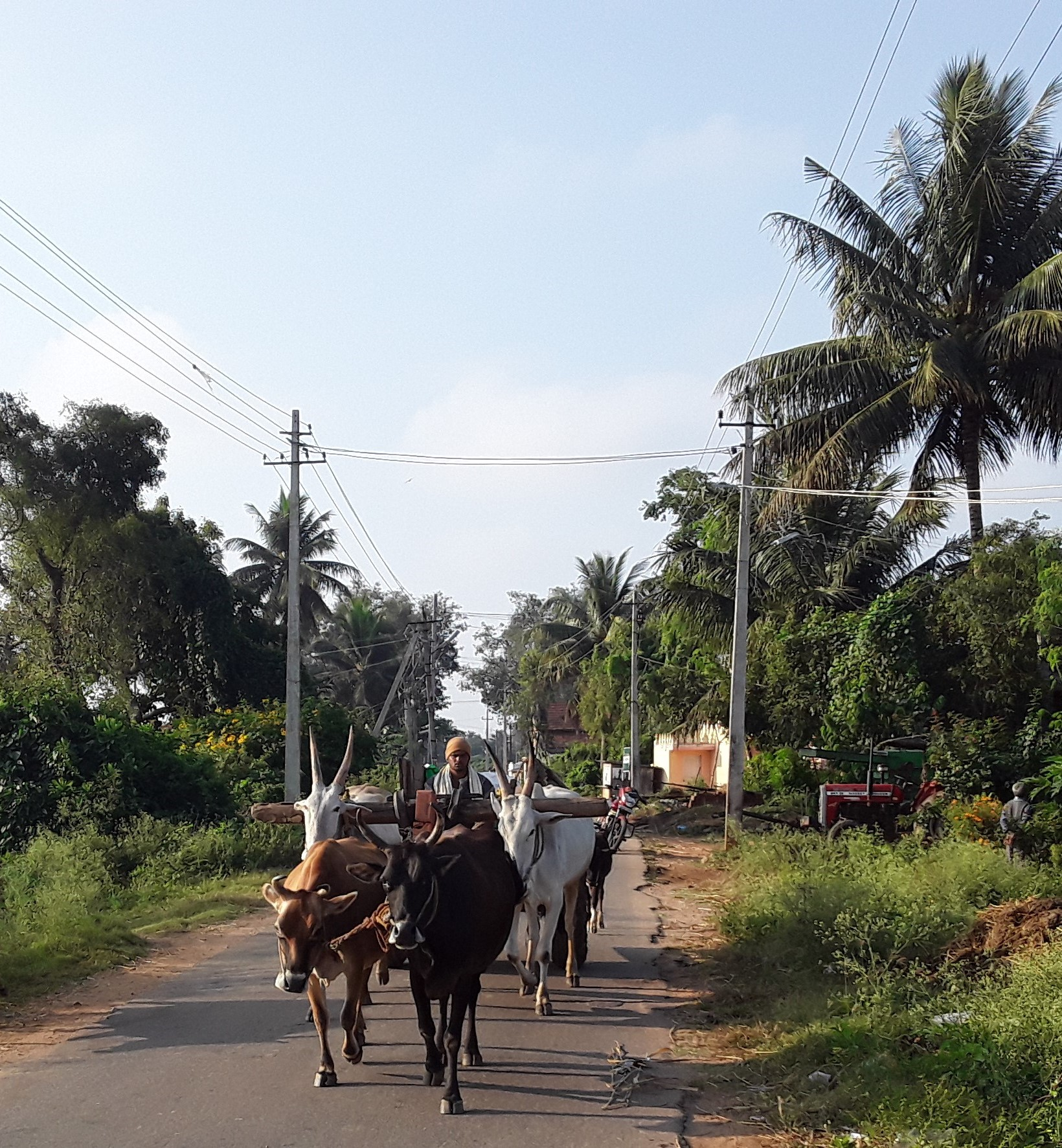
Kandenahalli Bridge on the northeast of the town

== See also ==
- Saligrama, Mysore
- Hosa Agrahara
