= Sri Raja-Lakshmi Foundation =

Raja-Lakshmi Award
- శ్రీ రాజా లక్ష్మీ ఫౌండేషన్
- Awarded for: Contributions to Fine Arts, Music, Science, Journalism, Medicine, Social Service
- Sponsored by: Sri Raja-Lakshmi Foundation
- Reward: ₹1,00,000 (one lakh rupees)
- First award: 1979
- Final award: 2009

Highlights
- Total awarded: 31
- First winner: Sri Sri
- Last winner: Sunita Narain

The Sri Raja-Lakshmi Foundation (Telugu: శ్రీ రాజా లక్ష్మీ ఫౌండేషన్) is an Indian charitable trust that promotes arts, sciences, literature, medicine, journalism, humanities and other intellectual pursuits and to honour distinguished persons in these fields. Established in 1979 in Madras by Late P. V. Ramaniah Raja, a businessman, the foundation instituted the 'Raja-Lakshmi Award'.

Erstwhile the Raja–Lakshmi Award carried a prize amount of ₹1,00,000, a citation and a plaque. The awardees also received the Dr. K. V. Rao and Dr. Jyoti Rao Award of US$2000, in association with the Telugu Fine Arts Society, New Jersey, USA. The Foundation has also instituted the 'Ratna Rao Memorial Prize' which is awarded annually to the best student in M.Sc. Chemistry at the Indian Institute of Technology Madras. In 2025, the Foundation resumed the presentation of the "Lakshmi-Raja Vaidika Puraskar”.

== History ==
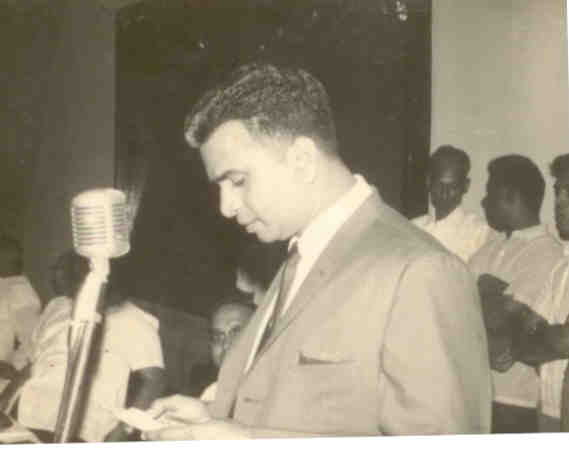
Ramaniah Raja, Managing Trustee, Sri Raja-Lakshmi Foundation

The organisation, along with the Raja–Lakshmi Award, instituted awards such as the Raja–Lakshmi Literary Award (1987–1999) and "Recognise the Teacher" Award. Special awards (Raja–Lakshmi Visishta Puraskar) have also been announced on a one-off basis. 'Lakshmi-Raja Vaidika Puraskar' was instituted in 1994, coinciding with the 60th birthday of Smt. Mahalakshmi Raja, founder trustee of the Foundation. This Award honours Vedic scholars, and consists of a Citation, a plaque and a cash prize of ₹25,000/-.

These Awards were announced on August 15 (birthday of Late Smt. Mahalakshmi Raja) every year and presented at a function on November 19 (birthday of Sri Ramaniah Raja) in the same year.

== Activities ==
The Foundation is now actively involved in charitable work in areas of Education, Education improvement, Environment, Health, Culture and assistance for special children.

== Recipients ==
=== Raja-Lakshmi Award ===
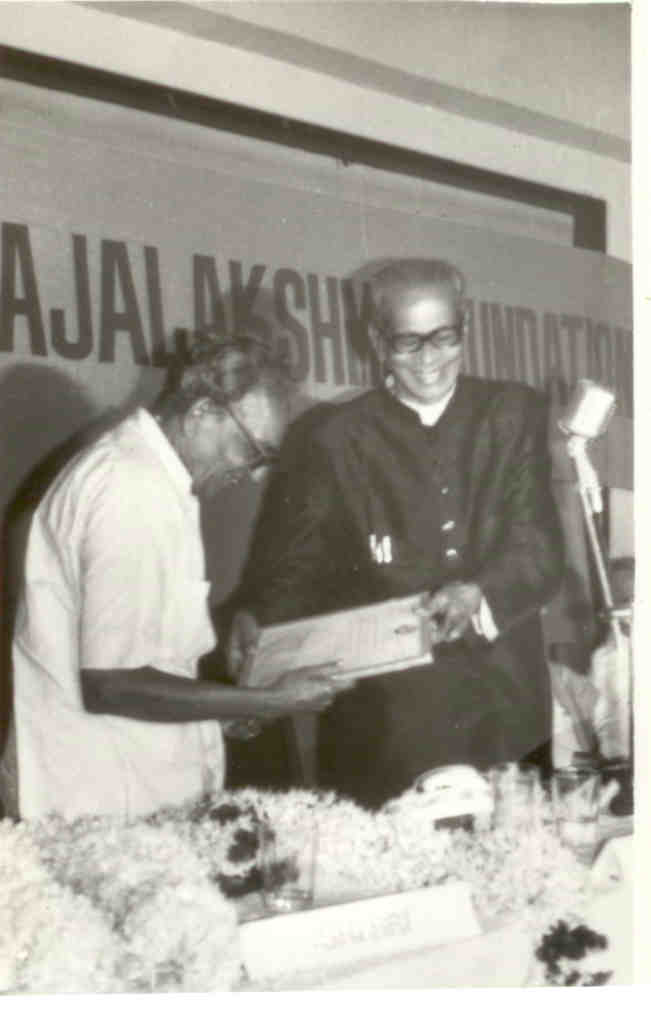
Dr. Bezawada Gopala Reddy presenting the first Raja-Lakshmi Award to Sri Sri on 19.11.1979

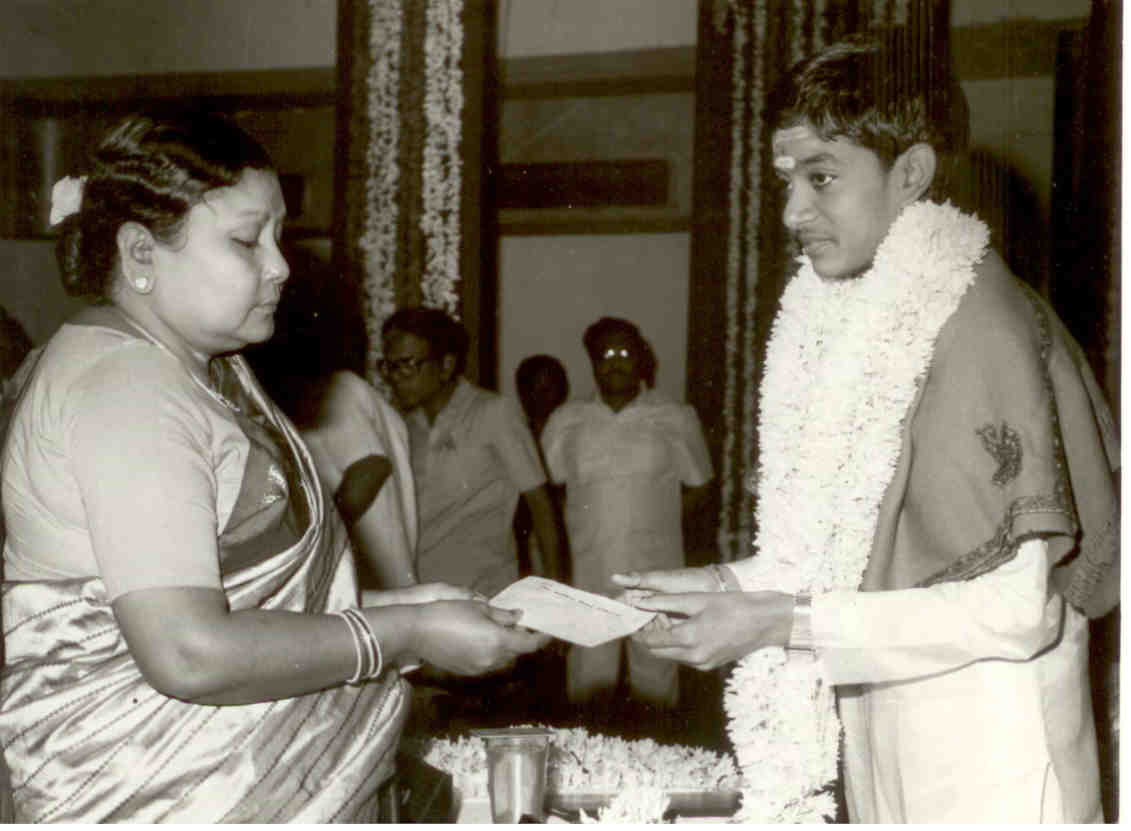
Smt.Mahalakshmi Raja presenting the 1985 Raja-Lakshmi Award to Mandolin Srinivas

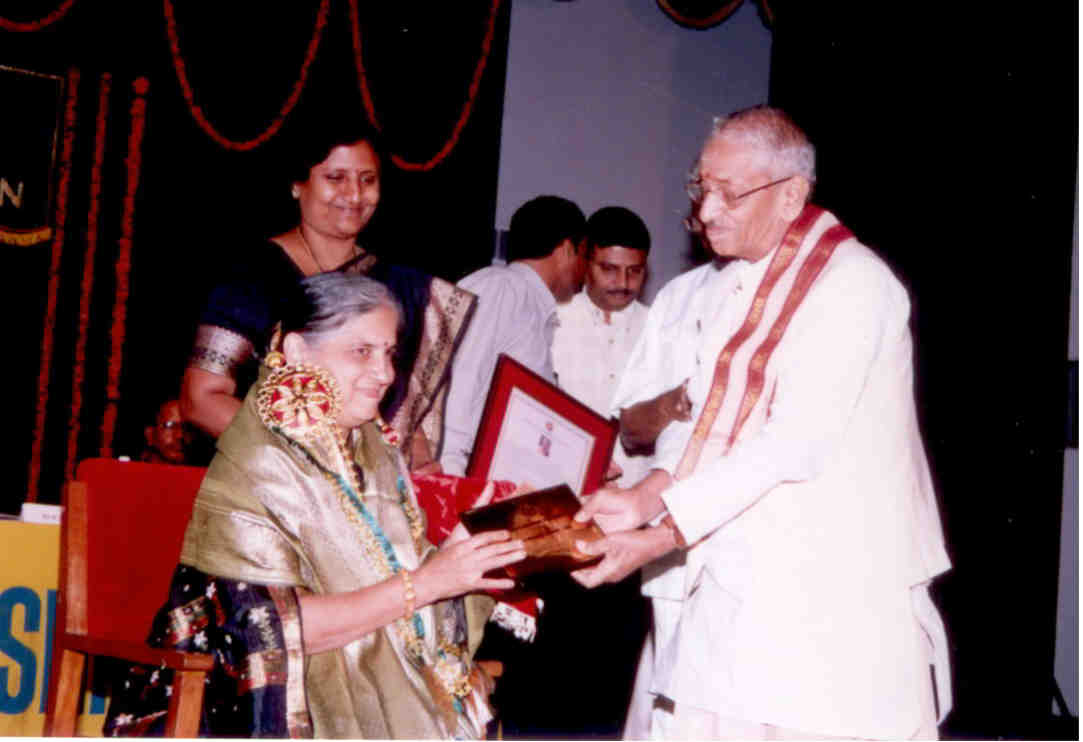
Sadguru Sivananda Murty presenting the 2004 Raja-Lakshmi Award to Smt. Sudha Murty

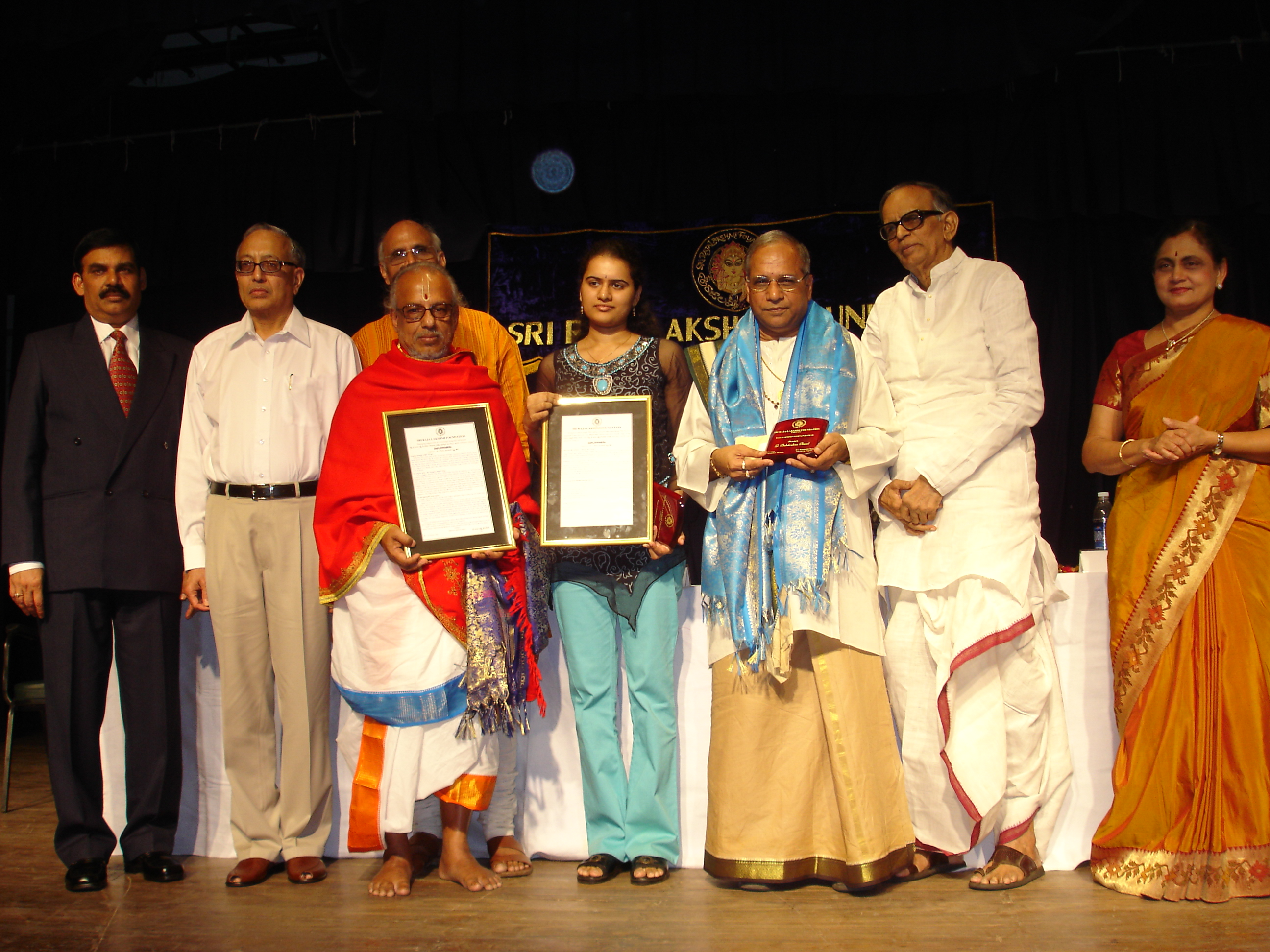
Raja-Lakshmi Awards-2008, L to R: R.Sekar IPS, N.Murali, Pappu Venugopala Rao, R.Venkatraman Ghanapaati, Koneru Humpy, Balakrishna Prasad, B.S.R.Krishna, Janani Krishna

| Year | Awardee | Area |
|---|---|---|
| 1979 | Sri Sri | Literature |
| 1980 | Mangalampalli Balamuralikrishna | Music |
| 1981 | Vempati Chinna Satyam | Dance |
| 1981 | Nerella Venumadhav | Mimicry |
| 1982 | Bapu | Graphic art |
| 1983 | Yelavarthy Nayudamma | Science |
| 1984 | Tanguturi Suryakumari | Music and Dance |
| 1985 | Mandolin Srinivas | Music |
| 1986 | G. K. Reddy | Journalism |
| 1987 | Dr. B. Ramamurthi | Medicine |
| 1988 | C. Narayanareddy | Literature |
| 1989 | Bezawada Gopala Reddy | Politics |
| 1990 | Lata Mangeshkar | Music |
| 1991 | Nataraja Ramakrishna | Dance |
| 1992 | Dwaram Venkataswamy Naidu Trust | Music |
| 1993 | P. Sainath | Journalism |
| 1994 | G. Ram Reddy | Education |
| 1995 | Dr. Ambati Balamurali Krishna | Medicine |
| 1996 | Abid Hussain | Administration |
| 1997 | A. Chennagantamma | Social service |
| 1998 | Bhanumathi Ramakrishna | Actor |
| 1999 | A. S. Raman | Journalism |
| 1999 | S. V. Rama Rao | Art |
| 2000 | K. Sivananda Murty | Social service |
| 2001 | Govindappa Venkataswamy | Medicine |
| 2002 | Nedunuri Krishna Murthy | Music |
| 2003 | Biruduraju Ramaraju | Literature |
| 2004 | Sudha Murthy | Philanthropy |
| 2005 | Malladi Chandrasekhara Sastry | Vedic Scholar |
| 2006 | S P Balasubrahmanyam | Cine Playback Singer |
| 2007 | Dr. Ch. Gnaneswar Memorial Endowment Fund | Medicine |
| 2008 | Koneru Humpy | Sports |
| 2009 | Sunita Narain | Environmental Science |

=== Raja-Lakshmi Literary Award ===
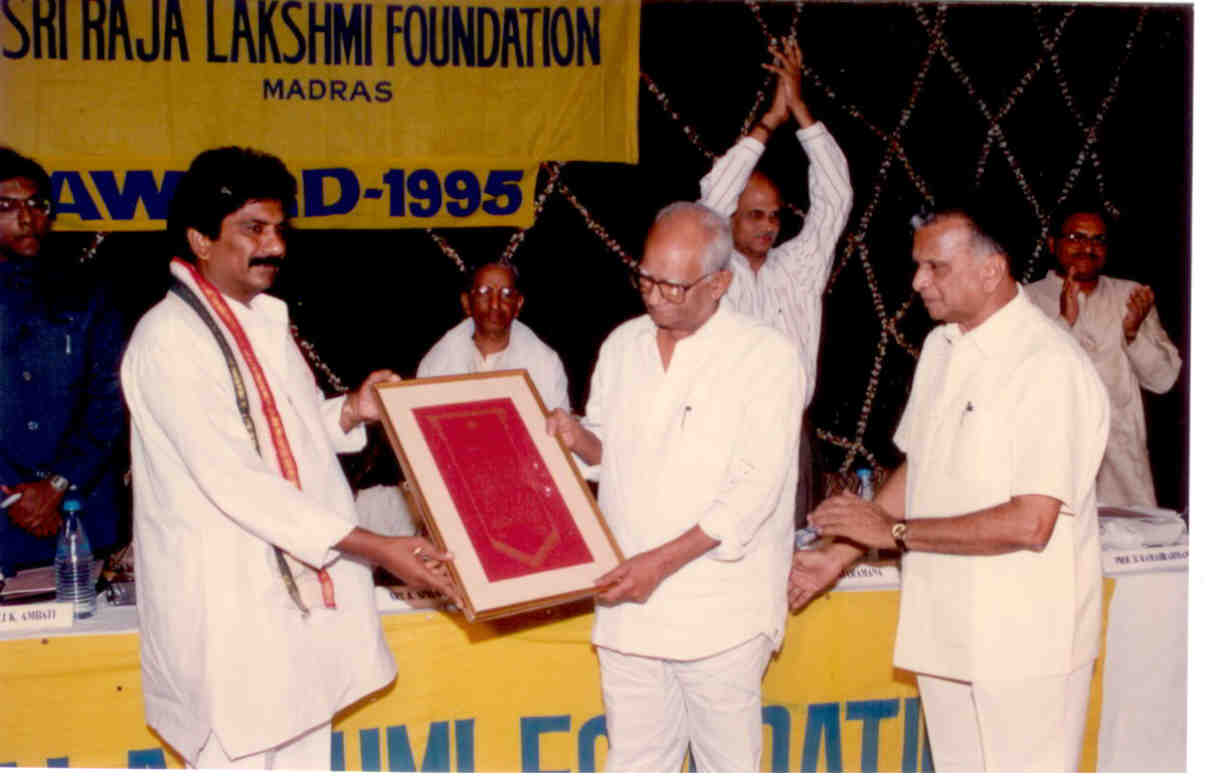
Mayor Sabbam Hari presenting the 1995 Raja-Lakshmi Literary Award to Sri Mullapudi Venkata Ramana

| Year | Awardee |
|---|---|
| 1987 | Ravuri Bharadwaja |
| 1988 | Nagabhairava Koteswara Rao |
| 1989 | Tirumala Ramachandra |
| 1990 | Ramavarapu Krishnamurthy Sastry |
| 1991 | Boyi Bhimanna |
| 1992 | Sribhashyam Appalacharyulu |
| 1993 | Mikkilineni |
| 1994 | P. S. R. Appa Rao |
| 1995 | Mullapudi Venkata Ramana |
| 1996 | Malati Chandur |
| 1997 | Mallampalli Sarabheswara Sarma |
| 1998 | K. Ramalakshmi |
| 1999 | Kothapalli Veerabhadra Rao & Dwivedula Visalakshi |

=== Lakshmi-Raja Vaidika Puraskar ===
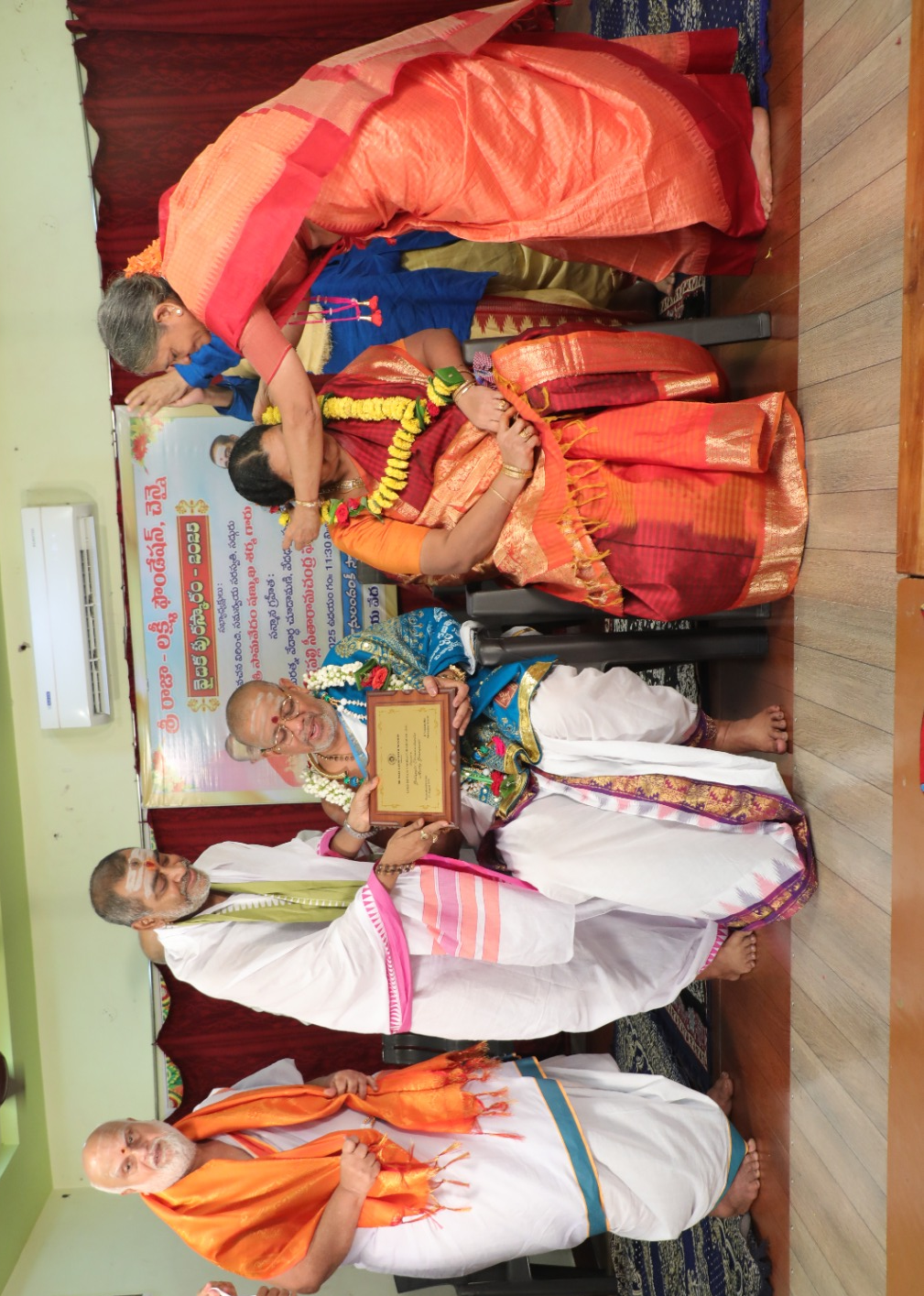
Sri Samavedam Shanmukha Sarma presenting the 2025 Lakshmi-Raja Vaidika Puraskaram to Sri Gullapalli Sitaramachandra Murthy Ghanapaati

| Year | Awardee |
|---|---|
| 1994 | Brahmasri Lanka Venkata Ramasastry Somayaji |
| 1995 | Brahmasri Sannidhanam Lakshminarayana Sastry |
| 1996 | Brahmasri Dendukoori Agnihotra Somayaji |
| 1997 | Brahmasri Remella Suryaprakasa Sastry |
| 1998 | Goda Subrahmanya Sastry |
| 1999 | Brahmasri Bhamidipati Mitranarayana Yajulu |
| 2000 | Dendukuri Venkatappa Yagnanarayana Poundarika Yajulu & Samavedam Ramagopala Sastry |
| 2001 | Brahmasri Gullapalli Anjaneya Ghanapaati |
| 2002 | Brahmasri Evani Ramakrishna Ghanaapati |
| 2003 | Brahmasri Adithe Suryanarayana Murty |
| 2004 | Dr. Vishnubhatla Subrahmanya Sastry |
| 2005 | ‘Veda Vibushana’ Kuppa Siva Subrahmanya Avadhani |
| 2006 | Sripada Srirama Nrusimha & Sripada Krishnamurthy Ghanaapati |
| 2007 | Gullapalli Venkata Narayana Ghanaapati |
| 2008 | R. Venkatrama Ghanapaati |
| 2009 | Vangala Ramamurthy Ghanapaati |
| 2010 | Dendukuri Venkata Hanumadganaapati Somayaji |
| 2011 | Yanamandra Subrahmanya Somayajulu |
| 2012 | Vishnubhotla Sriramamurthy Sastry |
| 2013 | Kuppa Ramagopala Vajpeyi |
| 2014 | Dendukuri Venkateswara Ghanapaati |
| 2025 | Gullapalli Sitamaramachandra Murthy Ghanapaati |

=== Raja-Lakshmi Recognise the Teacher Award ===
| Year | Awardee |
|---|---|
| 1997 | Dr.Jaya Venugoapala Rao |
| 1998 | K S Anand |
| 1999 | Gulla Usha Bala |

=== Raja-Lakshmi Visishta Puraskar ===
| Year | Awardee |
|---|---|
| 1983 | Palagummi Padmaraju |
| 1992 | M. S. Bharat |
| 1998 | Bhavaraju Sarveswara Rao |
| 2002 | Gollapudi Maruthi Rao |
| 2004 | Bapu & Ramana |
| 2008 | Garimella Balakrishna Prasad |

=== V.Ratna Rao Memorial Prize ===
| Year | Awardee |
|---|---|
| 2001 | D. Vasumathi |
| 2002 | Iyer Karthik Srinivasan |
| 2003 | Nandini Ananth |
| 2004 | Samanwita Pal |
| 2005 | S. Ashok |
| 2006 | Sayani Chattopadhyay |
| 2007 | Rakesh Paul |
| 2008 | Krishnendu Saha |
| 2009 | Sovan Biswas |
| 2010 | Sourav Maiti |
| 2011 | Prem Kumar Chanani |
| 2012 | R.Srinivasan |
| 2013 | Avijit Baidya |
| 2014 | Sayan Dutta |
| 2015 | Manisha Samanta |
| 2016 | Anindita Mahapatra |
| 2017 | Nisha |
| 2018 | Ruchira Basu |
| 2019 | Atanu Ghosh |
| 2020 | Deeksha |
| 2021 | Mehak Oberoi |
| 2022 | Sunaina Sardana |
| 2023 | Khusboo Goel |
| 2024 | Hiba Sherin P K |
| 2025 | Ayushi Tripathi |

== Memorial lectures delivered ==
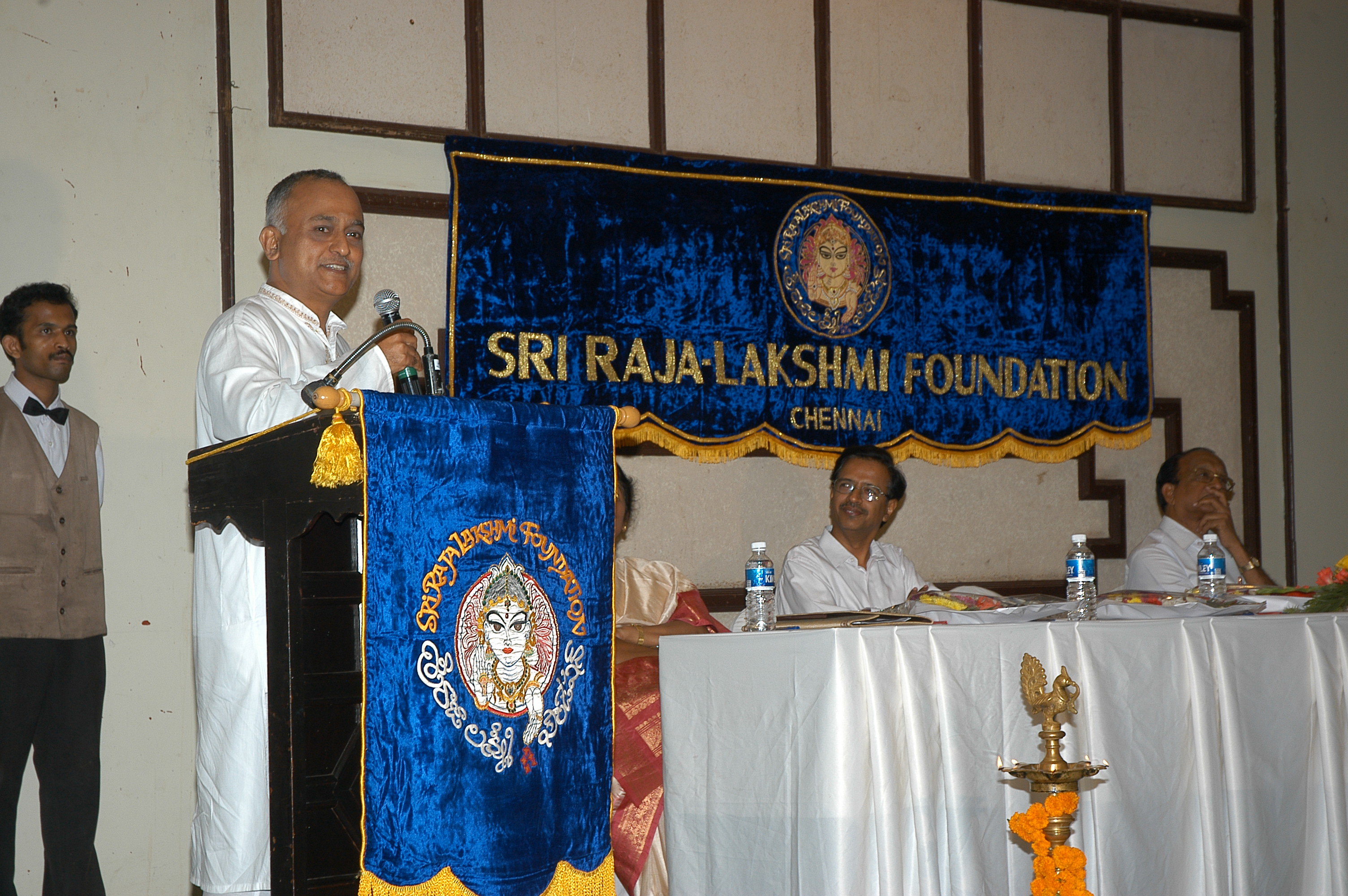
Sri T. A. Venkateswaran delivering the Memorial Lecture for the year 2007.

| Year | Awardee |
|---|---|
| 2002 | A. Prasanna Kumar |
| 2003 | Ajeya Kallam |
| 2004 | Dr. B.P. Rajan |
| 2005 | T.V. Sairam & B.M. Rao |
| 2006 | K. Sivaprasad Gupta |
| 2007 | K. Chaya Devi, Dr. K. Venkateswarulu & T.A. Venkateswaran |
| 2008 | Dr. Perala Balamurali |
| 2009 | Dr. Kanthamani Sundharkrishnan |

== Publications ==
| S.No. | Year | Name of Publication | Author |
|---|---|---|---|
| 01 | 1985 | Bhaja Govindam | Dr.Pappu Venugopala Rao |
| 02 | 1986 | Sundara Kandamu | Usha Sri |
| 03 | 1987 | Leela Krishnudu | Indraganti Srikantha Sarma |
| 04 | 1988 | Nityarchana | Dr.Pappu Venugopala Rao |
| 05 | 1990 | Sri Mata | Sri Mataji Thyagisanandapuri |
| 06 | 1992 | Aatma Bodha | Karidehal Venkata Rao |
| 07 | 1996 | Sanatsu Jateeya Sourabham | Prof.Salaaka Raghunadha Sarma |
| 08 | 2000 | Sivananda Lahari Hamsa | Prof.Salaaka Raghunadha Sarma |
| 09 | 2006 | Pratibha Panchamrutham | Rambhatla Nrusimha Sarma |
| 10 | 2006 | Ramadas and Thyagaraja | Prof. A. Prasanna Kumar |
