= Sarveswara =

Sarveswara is an Indian male given name from Sanskrit meaning "supreme being" and may refer to:

- Bhavaraju Sarveswara Rao, an Indian economist and social scientist.
- Ramayanam Sarveswara Sastry, an Indian actor
- Sarveswara Satakam Shaiva Bhakti Satakam, a collection of Telugu poems written by Yathavakkula Annamayya

== See also ==
- Sarvesh
