= Rama Raju =

Rama Raju may refer to

== People ==
- Alluri Sitarama Raju, Indian revolutionary
- G. V. Rama Raju, Indian film director
- Raghu Rama Krishna Raju, Indian politician
- Vetukuri Venkata Siva Rama Raju, Indian politician
- Ramaraju, Indian film actor

== Art ==
- Ramaraju, play written by Srinivasa Rao
- Siva Rama Raju, Indian film
