= Venugopal =

Venugopal or Venu Gopal is an Indian surname come from Krishna, based on Gopāla (literally "cow protector") as bearer of the flute Venu.

- Dr. S Venugopal, Director - Aeronautical Development Establishment (ADE), DRDO.
- Busa Venugopal is from Lachpet Kamareddy Telangana, South INDIA.
- D. Venugopal or Danapal Venugopal is a member of the 15th Lok Sabha of India from Tiruvannamalai Constituency.
- V. Venugopal is an Indian Film Editor.
- K.C. Venugopal is an Indian politician and Union Minister of State for Power in Indian Government.
- G. Venugopal is an Indian playback singer, known for his works in Malayalam film industry.
- Kottayan Katankot Venugopal or K. K. Venugopal is a senior advocate of Supreme Court of India and a constitutional lawyer.
- Madduri Venugopal better known as Master Venu was an Indian film music composer.
- P. Venugopal is an Indian politician and incumbent member of the Parliament of India from Thiruvallur Constituency.
- Panangipalli Venugopal is an Indian Cardiovascular surgeon and hospital administrator.
- Rajani Venugopal is a former Test and One Day International cricketer.
- Vasanth Venugopal is an Indian soldier.
- Venugopal Chandrasekhar is a former National table tennis champion from Tamil Nadu.
- Venugopal Dhoot is an Indian businessman.
- Venugopal Sorab was a poet and writer in Kannada and in English.
- Y. Venugopal Reddy or Yaga Venugopal Reddy better known as Y. V. Reddy, is an Indian administrator and Governor of the Reserve Bank of India.
- Venugopal Kalyanasundaram

== See also ==
- Venugopal Rao (disambiguation)
