= Telugu folk literature =

Telugu folk literature is the folk literature of the Telugu language, including poetry and oral literature. It is part of Telugu literature.

== Early history ==
Telugu is a Dravidian language spoken in all of Telangana and Andhra Pradesh in India and parts of other southern states as well. The history of Telugu goes back as early as to 230 BC to 225 AD, and the evidence for the existence of is available in the Natya Shastra of the Bharatha people. Even better evidence is shown from the inscription of Nandampudi, written by the first Telugu poet Nannya, which goes back to the 11th century AD. The author of Samagrandhra Sahityam (The Comprehensive history of Telugu Literature) Aarudhra also developed a theory based on the inscription of the Amaravati Stupa Buddha Sthupa, built between 200 BC to 200 AD.

In the poetical work of the Kumārasambhava by Nanne Choda, in the 11th and 12th centuries, he mentioned different kinds of songs sung by different folk groups (goudu geetamulu or songs of gouds). Some more inscriptional evidence for the existence of folk literature are also available in the 6th century AD. Many traditional Telugu poetical works of earlier and medieval age, taking form the Palkuriki Somanadha's Basava purana to the Yakshagana (written works) of Nayaka kings of the 17th century, have mentioned about different performing castes and performing traditions, which were living and moving in the Andhra desa i.e., the present Andhra Pradesh.

== Functional genres ==
Many scholars classified Telugu folk literature in different divisions and sub divisions in an efficient way depending on the material they have considered for the study. Telugu folk literature can be classified on the basis of its utility, that is, how it functions. It can be divided into functional and nonfunctional or entertainment genres. Some of the literary forms are both. Caste myths and ritual narratives have specific social functions.

=== Caste myths ===
A caste myth is called a Kula Purana or Caste Purana. It is an origin narrative of a caste which explains the origin and establishment of a caste. It tries to establish a given caste as a higher most one in the social order and it is not inferior to any other caste. Caste myths are available in song, performing and prose narrative forms in oral tradition. (See: Kulapuranalu Asrita Vyavastha, Subbachary, p. 2000: for the detailed study of the caste myths and the dependent caste system.)

=== Ritual narratives ===
A ritual narrative is narrative sung or performed in a ritual. They are sung or performed in the Jataras or Tirunallas of the Mother goddess and the Perantalu or the deified women goddesses. Performing the narrative or the puranam or the myth of the goddess is very crucial in the weekday ritual of any mother goddess. These myths are very long and performed over from one night to seven nights. The audience listens to them not only with reverence but also with fear and obedience. Specific caste people from dalit communities Baindlas, Asadis are specialized and traditional singers for all these mother goddesses. The Kurumas are singers for the myths of the male gods Mallanna, Birappa and the Goddess Ellamma. The literature of these myths or the narratives is also very big repertoire in Telugu folk literature. Mother goddess narratives are performed in several hundred places in A.P. every year. A number of scholars Krishna Kumari.N, Venkata Subbarao.T.V, Premalata Ravi. Andamma.M and others have done research on mother goddess worship and narratives.

=== Proverbs ===
Another important functional genre is the Telugu sameta or the Telugu proverb. People use them in any mode of their expression. Number of researchers have already collected thousands of proverbs and published them region wide. One scholar, Chilukuri Narayana Rao, has collected to one hundred thousand proverbs. Several Colonial officials too collected Telugu proverbs. Captain Carr's collection is prominent among them. He collected around three thousand proverbs and translated them into English.

== Persons and professional singers and patronage ==
Telugu folk literature can be divided in two major classes: folk literature created by professional singers and/or performers and the literature created by others. The folk literary genres created by the professional performers are different from the other genres in terms of length, prose and poetry combination, narration, and in other aspects. A number of castes of Andhra Pradesh are specialized to perform different kinds folk art forms in which literature is a vital part. Singing and performing is their basic profession and they get lively hood by this profession. Again the professional singers or the bards or ministerial can be divided into two kinds some performing castes perform their art form to any caste or family of any village. For example, snake charmers or Pamula vallu, Haridasus, Satanis, Jangamas, Saradakadus and such other performers when they enter into a village they do not restrict their singing to only some castes or families. Other kind of singers do not extend their services to any body except their own patrons. They are dependents to only one caste. They narrate myths, caste myths, or other narratives only to their patrons. Narrating to others encroaching into other singer's jurisdiction is a crime according to their caste laws.

Most of the important Telugu folk narratives, myths, legends are created by the professional singers and performers of the performing caste, all the caste myths are created by the dependent caste singers or the Asritakulalavaru. Other important epics like Mahabharata, Ramayana, Palanati Virakatha, Bobbilikatha, Katamaraju Kathalu, the myths of mother goddesses, and other important lengthy wonder tales which are very popular among Telugus are created by professional singers or the caste performers.

The folk literature created by men, women, and children consists of folk songs, song narratives, lullabies, work songs, women songs, different other kind of songs, general tales, wonder tales proverbs, riddles and so on. Collection and researching of these folk genres has been started in the colonial period itself. After the advent of universities in A.P several scholars did research on all kinds of these genres.

== The arena of folk literary genres ==
Krishnakumari made a comprehensive classification of Telugu folk literature. It can be followed here to enumerate the Telugu folk literature and some more items can also be added to this classification.

=== Prose or Vachana Sakha ===
The Prose division has two important sections they are Katha Sahitham or Prose with story and Katha Rahitham or prose without story. The section prose with story contains Nitikathalu (moral tales) Vira Kathalu, (epics) Adbhuta Kathalu (wonder tales), Purakathalu (myths), Itihasalu (legends) Pedarasi Peddamma Kathalu (fables). Some more categories can also be identified like Kula Kathalu (caste myths in prose), Perantalla Kathalu (stories of deified women), Tirpu Kathalu (stories of judgments), and so on. The non-story prose genres are proverbs and riddles or Sametalu and Podupukathalu.

=== Poetry or Geya Sakha ===
The poetry division again has Story and non-story sections. In story section Sramika Geyamulu (work songs), Strila patalu (women songs) Asrita kulala vari Patalu (songs by different caste performers) are there. In work songs male female division is there. The songs by women while they are working in fields are very important. Several stories are revealed and they give vent to their feelings through these stories. The songs at home are different from these songs not only in rhythm but also in length and mode of narration. The women songs can be classified into vrata kathalu or the stories of women rituals and pouranika stories or the mythological stores. Songs of the professional singers or the dependent castes can be categorized into Vira Kathalu (heroic songs or ballads), Adbhuta Kathalu (wonder tales or fairy tales), Purakathalu (general myths and myths of mother goddesses), Charitraka Kathalu (historical songs) Strila kathalu (women related stories). The non-story section in the Poetry division contain three important categories they are Sharmika Geyamulu or work songs, Paramarthika Geyamulu or mystic songs and Koutumbika Geyamulu or family songs. The work songs contain stringara (erotic), hasya (humor) and karuna (pathetic) kinds of songs and the family songs contain bandhutwa (songs of relation), and achara (ceremonious songs).

=== Drama or Drisya Sakha ===
The third division is Drisya Sakha, folk drama or folk theatre. Most of the art forms of (more than fifty) the dependant castes are theatre forms. The art forms like Oggu katha, Bindla Katha, Kommula Katha, Sarada Katha, Burra katha, Runja Katha, Chindu Yakshaganam, chirutala Yakshaganam, Patam katha, Pandava Katha, and several folk art forms are very popular theatre forms in which the spoken word is vital, are very rich for literature. Vidhi natakam, Yakshaganam, Turpu Bhagotam, and some other folk art forms are there which are for all castes in any village. The theatre division can be classified into two sections one is theatre by the artists the other is puppet theatre. Literature is an essential ingredient even in the puppet theatre. The Ramayana story is basic theme for the shadow puppet theatre of Andhra Pradesh. Patam Katha or the scroll narrative contains the Mahabharata as its theme, entire Mahabharata is narrated in different episodes in the art form of Pandavalu and Kakipadagalu artists. Some other mythical caste mythical themes are also there is form of scroll narratives. Still there are more than 72 folk theatre art forms are living in the region.

== Songs of the soil ==
Some Telugu folk narratives are very popular in Andhra Pradesh. They are associated with the history and folk life of the region. Even the Mahabharata and Ramayana stories and a plethora of historical and semihistorical narratives in various folk art forms acclaimed wide popularity and educated the rural non-literate people. They know the gods and goddesses kings and queens primarily from the folk narratives and visual media like Vidhi natakam (street play) Tolubommalata (shadow puppet theatre) Patam katha (scroll narrative) and so on. The cinema of early times did not try to go much away from the folk art forms. Cinema has not only got interested in folk art forms but also incorporated them in many ways. Folk literature, music, and art forms have their proper places in the cinema. Folk songs and their tunes are big money-making assets even in present day Telugu cinema.

=== Palnati Vira Charitra ===
Also called Palaanati Bharatam, this epic resembles the story of Mahabharata; it also contains a ferocious battle between brothers and close relatives. It is a heroic epic of Telugus. The epic is the story of the Haihaya dynasty and belongs to the 12th century. The battle is not just for the throne or the territory it is a battle between two religious philosophies, the Vaishanavism and Shaivism. The Brahmanaidu and the Nagamma take two sides. The Brahmanaidu advocates the equality of the castes and encourages the untouchable community to enter into the temples and allow them to dine with other village caste people. The effort was popularly called Chapakudu. The other religious sect under the leadership of Nagamma opposed the ‘anarchy’ but battled in the guise of cock fight, sending the kings to forests and finally to the battle field. Finally the blood of Telugu heroes and towering philosophy of Brahmanaidu stand victorious, and remained for ever in the land. The characters Brahmanaidu, Balachandrudu, Nagamma, Manchala are very popular in the entire region. The heroes are worshipped in an annual ritual in the folk art form of Pichukunti Katha which is performed by Pichukuntis or the palnati vira vidyavantulu a performing caste of Andhra Pradesh. The singers perform the epic with swords and shields in their hands and use them as props for their performance. The principal narrator takes a sword in the right hand and a shield in the left. A bunch of jingling bells are tied to the sword. The artist uses the sword as a musical instrument and it becomes a valuable prop in the narration of story. The singer becomes a battle hero. The tunes of the songs also appear in a different way. Most of the time they create a mood of sorrow and valor. The Palnati epic is not only a pride symbol of Telugus it is one of the great folk heroic sagas of the nation. Different scholars like Akkairaju Umakantam from the region collected the narrative and published. Gene H. Roghair collected the epic from the Pichukunti performers and published it along with English translation and a scholarly editorial. The epic is very popular not only in Pichukunti katha but also other folk art forms like Burra katha, Sarada katha.

=== Katamaraju Kathalu ===
Katamaraju Kathalu is a very long folk ballad, a very popular heroic song of the land. It is a big epic of a battle between the kings of Katamaraju, and Manumasiddhi of the Nellore Chodas. The battle occurred in the 13th century, it is the dispute of territory and the misunderstanding of two kings. The valor of Khadga Tikkana and the Telugu kings has been portrayed in this heroic song and the epic is being carried through folk literature and the art form Kommula Katha or Pumba Katha, performed by the caste Kommulas. Telugu culture and the pastoral life are widely described in the long epic. It is not only rich for the description of culture of the land but also for the poetry and expressions of the singers. The epic singers Kommulas and Pumbalas perform it in such a way that the audience immerses in the themes and they identify themselves in all the rasas or the emotions of the narrative. The folk epic is a symbol of the pride of Telugus. This ballad cycle has been collected and published in two big volumes of around three thousand pages, enriched by scholarly editorial by Tangirala Venkata Subbarao.

=== Bobbili Katha ===
It is another heroic folk epic of Telugu, however, based on the recent history of Telugu land. Bobbili is a small principality of Northern Andhra. The French commander, Marquis de Bussy-Castelnau, attacked the fort of Bobbili in 1757. This happened because of the rivalry between the two kingdoms of Bobbili and Vijayanagaram. Ultimately the treachery of kind Vijayaramaraju resulted in the war. The Bobbili heroes fought against the guns and cannons of French soldiers with their swords and arrows until they fall on the battlefield. The French soldiers were astonished by the utmost courage shown by the kings of Bobbili and other soldiers and even by the women soldiers. The heroes Paparayudu, Rangarayudu, and Vengalarayudu became househo;d words in Andhra. The people sing the valor of their heroes with pride. The saga of heroes remained in different folk literary genres, i.e. song, drama Burrakatha, Sarada Katha, apart from the classical literary forms.

=== Other narratives ===
Different types of folk tales shown in the aforementioned classification exist in Telugu folk literature. Short fables, bedtime tales, long wonder tales and such other types of tales still exist in large numbers. Balanagamma katha, Kumara Ramuni katha, Desingu raju katha and kasimajuli kathalu, Tenali Ramalingani kathalu and other tale cycles are very popular and taking breath in the winds of the Telugu villages.

Hundreds and thousands of folk songs were collected right from 1850 to present day, several collections were published and number of scholars did research on different themes of folk songs and published these. Song narratives of women are of two kinds: one is for at work and the other is for at home and in domestic rituals of vratas. Both are very important in terms of literature and gender issues.

Riddle is another very important prose genre of Telugu folk literature. Riddles in Telugu are entertaining and educating not only for the children but also for the elders. They come down from generation to generation. Telugu riddle does not have any ritual importance like riddles among other ethnic groups of the land. Thousands of riddles were collected by several scholars and published. Dr. Kasireddy Venkatareddy has done a remarkable research on Telugu riddles.

Some other unique folk literary genres also can be found in Andhra Pradesh in the performances by single individual artists like Pittala Dora, Harikatha and Runja Katha are unique in their mode of presentation and narrative techniques. The narrative in the Pittala dora does not contain any story or theme but it is a prose rendition goes on more than an hour in each performance. It attracts big crowds in the villages. The text creates high quality of humor by the gossip and themeless boosting speech by the artist. In similar fashion Runja Katha is known for its unique kind of narrating techniques. One artist takes the roles of all characters of the theme. Harikatha is also performed by a single singer but it is supported by two to other musical instruments. Though it can be considered as a folk art form it is a semi classical in its nature, music and literature. Most of the themes in Harikatha are mythological.

== See also ==
- Biruduraju Ramaraju - folklorist
- Nayani Krishnakumari - scholar of folklore studies

== Selected bibliography ==
- Arudra 1965 : Samgra Andhra Sahityam, (Vol.1) Secunderabad, M. Seshachalam & Co.
- Andamma, M. 1983 : Nalgonda Gilla Gramadevatalu, Unpublished PhD thesis submitted to the Department of Telugu, Osmania University
- Carr, M.W. 1868 (1988 reprint): A Collection of Telugu Proverbs, New Delhi, Asian Educational Services.
- Krishna Kumar, N.1977: Telugu Janapada Geya Gadhalu, Hyderabad, Andhra Saraswata Parisht.
- Krishnamoorty, BH.1979: Telugu Bhasha Charitra, Hyderabad, Andhra Pradesh Sahitya Akademi.
- Mahadeva Sastri, Korada (ed) 1987: Kumarasambhavamu (by Nannechoda Kaviraju), Hyderabad, Telugu Viswavidyalam.
- Ramaraju, B. 1978: Telugu Janapada Geya Sahityam, Hyderabad, janapada Prachuranalu.
  - 1978b:Folklore of Andhra Pradesh, New Delhi, National Book Trust.
- Roghair, Gene H.1982: The Epic of Palnadu. A Study and translation of palnati Vira Katha, A Telugu Oral Tradition from Andhra Pradesh, India, Oxford, Oxford University Press.
- Subbachary, Pulikonda 2000: Telugu lo Kulapuranalu Asrita Vyavastha, Hyderabad, Prajashakti Book house.
- Sundaram, R.V.S. 1983: Andhrula janapada Vignanam, Hyderabad, Andhra Pradesh Sahitya Akademi.
- Venkata Subbarao, Tangirala. 1976: Katamaraju Kathalu (Vol.I), Hyderabad, Andhra Pradesh Sahitya Akademi.
  - 1978: Katamaraju Kathalu (Vol.II) Hyderabad, Andhra Pradesh Sahitya Akademi.
  - 2000: Telugu Vira Gatha Kavitvam, Bangalore, Sri Rasa.
