= Boyi Bhimanna =

Indian writer (1911–2005)

- Born: 19 September 1911; Mamidikuduru, British India
- Died: 16 December 2005 (aged 94); Hyderabad, Andhra Pradesh, India
- Occupation: poet
- Parent: Boyi Pullaiah (Father) Boyi Nagamma (Mother)
- Awards: Padma Bhushan (2001)

Dr. Boyi Bhimanna (19 September 1911 – 16 December 2005), transliterated alternatively as Bheemanna or Bheemana, was a Telugu poet.

== Early life ==
Bhimanna was born in a poor Dalit family in Mamidikuduru village, East Godavari District of Andhra Pradesh in 1911. He participated in the Quit India Movement. He wrote a book called "Gudiselu Kaalipothunnay" (The Burning huts).

== Writings ==
He was influenced by the teachings of Mahatma Gandhi and Dr. B. R. Ambedkar. His writings reflected the angst of the down-trodden. He wore several hats such as that of a writer, poet, journalist and academic. He was a member of the senate of Andhra University. He was the director of the Andhra Pradesh state translation division for some time.

He wrote in English, as well, and the work entitled Seventh Season, a collection of his English poetry, was well-received. He wrote over seventy books in his career, with the work Gudiselu Kaalipothunnaayi (transl.The Huts are Burning) being the most popular.

Bhimanna has written many literary works; some of the most popular among them are Paleru, Janabaduni Jabulu, Dharmamkosam Poratam etc.

Paleru is described as having brought changes in many poor and dalit families. Many backward caste parents started joining their children in school for better and beautiful future.

== Selected list of works ==
- Gudiselu Kaalipothunnaai
- Naku Telisina Jashuva
- Bhimanna Ugadulu
- Rajakiya Veerudu Dr. Khan
- Paleru (play)
- Pilli Satakam
- Paleru nunchi Padmasri Varaku (auto-biography)
- janabhaduni jabulu
- Kooli Raju
- Ragavaasishtam
- Dharmam Kosam Poratam
- Raga Vaisakhi
- Deepa Sabha
- Raabheelu
- Ragodayam
- Madhubala
- Madhugeetha
- Naa Oohalalo Valmiki
- Bhimanna Shankharavam
- Gilli Cheptunna
- Idigo, Idee Bhagavadgeetha
- Chatuvulu- Swagathaalu
- Entha Cheekati Enni Deepaalu
- Kukka Morugutoone Undi
- Srisri Communistu Kaadu
- Baalayogeeyam
- The Seventh Season
- Paramaatma
- Drug Addictulu
- Anaadi kosam nunchi Anantatvam loki
- Manavuni Maroka Majili
- Chandaalika
- Pairu Paata
- Ambedkara Suprabhatam
- Ambedkara Matham
- Mani Manasam
- Panchama Swaram
- Sivalakalu
- God the Drug
- Veda Vyasudu
- Dharma Vyadhudu
- Pragathi
- Jagat Satyam Brahma Mithya
- Oyi Kavi Kavitvam Raayi
- Bhimanna Kavya Kusumaalu

== Awards ==
He won several awards, including the Sahitya Akademi Puraskar for Gudiselu Kaalipothunnaayi in 1975. He was honoured by the Government of India with the fourth and third highest civilian awards in the country, namely the Padma Shri and the Padma Bhushan in 1973 and 2001, respectively.

Bhimanna was also awarded the title Kala Prapoorna (honorary doctorate) by Andhra University. From 1978 to 1984, he was a member of the Andhra Pradesh Legislative Council.

He was awarded Kala Ratna Award from Andhra Pradesh Government in 2003. In 1992, Telugu University conferred a special award on him and in 1996, the state government awarded him the Atma Gauravam Puraskaram (transl. Self-Respect Award).

Bhimanna also received the prestigious Raja-Lakshmi Literary Award from the Sri Raja-Lakshmi Foundation in Chennai for the year 1991, as well as the Loknayak Award.

== Death ==
He suffered from Parkinson's disease and, after a period of ailment, died at the Nizam's Institute of Medical Sciences in Hyderabad.
