= Dwivedula Visalakshi =

Indian writer

Dwivedula Visalakshi (1929 – 7 November 2014), was a well-known Telugu writer. Hailing from Vizianagaram, the cultural capital of Andhra Pradesh, she distinguished herself as a writer of short stories and novels. Her lucid style adorned all her novels from Vaikuntapaali, Vaaradhi to Enta Dooram Ee Payanam. The novel Vaaradhi has even been a hit on silver screen. She received the D.Litt. Degree from the Potti Sreeramulu Telugu University, Hyderabad in 1998.

She wrote many books and short stories.

She was the recipient of Sri Raja-Lakshmi Foundation Literary Award in 1999.

She donated the rights on her books to Dt. Gen Library (Poura Grandhalayam Dwarakanagar, Visakhapatnam, in the presence of Dr. D. V. Subba Rao Ex-Mayar, Shri Bhamidipati Ramagopalam garu etc.).

== Literary works ==
- Vaikuntapaali (1963)
- Ee Payanam Chatiki
- Yekkavalasina Railu
- Vaaradhi
- Enta Dooram Ee Payanam
- Reati Velugu
- Grahanam Vidichindi
- Maarina Viluvalu
- Jaarudu Metlu
