= Nayani Krishnakumari =

Nayani Krishnakumari (14 March 1930 – 29 January 2016) was an Indian scholar, poet, researcher, speaker in Telugu and an active participant in literary and cultural organizations. She served several institutions in various capacities. She received several awards such as Swarnakankanam, instituted by Desoddharaka Kasinathuni Nageswara Rao, Best Telugu Writer award from Potti Sreeramulu Telugu University, and Sahitya Akademi among others.

== Life ==
Krishnakumari was born to Nayani Subba Rao and Hanumayamma in Guntur, a town in Andhra Pradesh, India. She was married to Canakapalli Madhusudana Rao, a lawyer and a distant relative, in 1954. They have one daughter and two sons.

Krishnakumari has been an active participant in literary and cultural events. She worked on Telugu ballads and obtained her doctorate in 1970. She had a master's degree in Sanskrit.

In her dissertation, Krishnakumari took the western critiquing tools and explained the narrative style in Telugu ballads and correlated their underlying philosophy to the Telugu culture scientifically.

Her first book, a story of the Andhra people, entitled Andhrula katha, was published when she was 18. The book was prescribed as a textbook in schools. Her first collection of poetry, agniputri, was published in 1978, shortly after her father died. She died on 29 January 2016 at the age of 85.

=== Positions held ===
She started her academic career as lecturer in a women's college in Madras in 1951. In 1952, she moved to Osmania University Women's College in Hyderabad, where she started out as lecturer, and became a reader and professor. During 1983-84, she served as Principal of Padmavathi Mahila University, Tirupati, and returned to Osmania University as Head of the Department of Telugu. She retired in 1990 after serving as the Chair of the Board of Studies in Osmania University for three years. Krishnakumari served as Vice Chancellor of Sri Potti Sreeramulu Telugu University, Hyderabad, from 1996 to 1999. At the time of her death, she was professor emeritus.

== Literary works ==
Krishnakumari was a pioneer in folklore studies and women's literature.

Krishnakumari's Telugu Janapada Geya gaathalu (Telugu ballads) is considered her major work. In this dissertation, published in 1977, Krishnakumari discussed at length the origin and development of Telugu ballads in the context of Telugu folk literature. She identified the folk literature as a separate and valuable part of Indian literatures, compared it to similar literatures in other cultures and countries, and produced a systematic classification chart of ethnology, ethnography and sociology. Further, she has shown how other branches such as songs and stories incorporated physical gestures and other theatrical paraphernalia over the course of time. In this she also noted the inclusion of terminology from other languages, which happened with educated singers of the ballads.

During her tenure as professor at Potti Sreeramulu Telugu University, Krishnakumari published a textbook on folklore entitled Telugu janapada vijnanam: samaajam, samskruti, sahityam, containing articles by several scholars in folklore with topics for discussion and further research.

One of Krishnakumari's innovations was to apply the straight line equation from mathematics to the storytelling methods in folklore. This was an innovating experiment in the studies of folklore in Telugu literature and marked Krishnakumari's knowledge of mathematics and her erudition in research methodologies.

Krishnakumari publications include two anthologies of her poetry, Agniputri (Daughter of Fire, 1978) and Em cheppanu nestam! (What Can I Say, My Friend!, 1988); history books: Andhrula katha (The Story of Andhra People), manamuu, mana puurvulu (We and Our Ancestors), telugu bhasha charitra (History of Telugu language); two collections of short stories: Ayaatha (A Collection of short stories), Gautami (novel), Aparajita (A collaborative novel with three other writers), pariseelana (An Anthology of reviews), parisodhana (A Collection of research papers), kashmira deepakalika (A travelogue, recounting her experiences of a tour in Kashmir with a group of students), and Telugu Janapada geya gaathalu (Ph.D. dissertation on ballads in Telugu folklore) among several others. Numerous articles on Telugu people's customs, lifestyles, and culture also attest to her comprehension and knowledge in the areas in question.

Her travelogue, kashmira deepakalika, is considered unique in Telugu literature for its style. It is an account of her experiences and her response to the beauty of nature in the Kashmir valley during a tour with a group of students she had accompanied. Chekuri Ramarao stated that the book, unlike usual travelogues, is a literary masterpiece brimming with poetry.

Marking her sixtieth birthday and retirement, several scholars and the elite in Andhra Pradesh honored Krishnakumari. The festschriften volume, vidushi, features several articles from reputable scholars in Andhra Pradesh.

=== List of important literary works ===
- Agniputri. Hyderabad: Author. 1978
- Andhrula katha: A History of Andhras for children
- Ayaathaa. A Collection of short stories.
- Em cheppanu nestam. Hyderabad: Author. 1988
- Janapada geyaalu.
- Kashmira deepakalika, A Travelogue
- Kathala kadali: Retold stories of Katha Saritsagaram
- McKenzie kaifiyats (A Critical Evaluation)
- Nalgonda zilla uyyaala paatalu
- Pariseelana. Hyderabad: Author, 1977
- Parisodhana. Hyderabad: Andhra Saraswata parishad, 1979.
- Telugu Bhasha Charitra. Hyderabad: Telugu Akademi.n.d.
- Telugu Janapada Geya Gaathalu: Telugu Folk Ballads
- Telugu Janapada Vijnanam: society, culture and literature. Hyderabad: Potti Sreeramulu
- Jaanapada saraswati. Hyderabad: Janapada Sahitya Parishat, 1996. Telugu University, 2000 (Krishnakumari, Nayani. Ed.)

Translations:

- Toru Dutt (from English to Telugu)
- Folklore of Andhra Pradesh (from English to Telugu)

== Awards ==
Krishnakumari has received several prestigious awards such as -

- Gruhalakshmi Swarnakankanam
- Best Woman Writer of Andhra Pradesh Sahitya Akademi
- Best Writer from Potti Sreeramulu Telugu University
- Potti Sreeramulu Telugu University Award in the best literature produced by women
- ASSOCHAM Ladies League, Hyderabad Women of the Decade Achievers Award for Excellence in Literature
