= Mallampalli Sarabheswara Sarma =

Mallampalli Sarabheswara Sarma (27 March 1928 – 13 April 2007), popularly known as 'Sarabhayya', was a well-known Indian poet, critic, translator and exponent of classical literature.

== Biography ==
Sarabhayya began writing poetry at twelve and won laurels for his poems from the stalwarts like Sri Chellapilla Venkata Sastry, Sri Katuri Venkateswara Rao and Viswanatha Satyanarayana. He was fondly called 'Bala Kavi Kesari' by them. He spent most of his time in cultural capital of Andhra Pradesh 'Rajahmundry'.

Sarabhayya had his traditional Sanskrit gurukula education at his father and completed the 'pancha kavyas' before he was thirteen years old.

He published his poems in various literary magazines and reviewed many books under the pen name 'pavaki'.

Sri Viswanadha held Sarabhayya's views in high esteem and eagerly waited for his remarks on his poems. The Kavisamrat made it a point to recite first to Sarabhayya and then only to others.

== Awards and honours ==
In 1997, he received the Raja-Lakshmi Literary Award for his contribution to literature. He also won Gupta Foundation Award and many titles and awards.

Sarabhayya's article 'Sahrudayabhisaranam' was considered the best literary article and was prescribed for the high school students by the Government of Andhra Pradesh.

== His works ==
Sarabhayya's works include poems, dramas, translations, commentaries, articles, and reviews.

=== Poems ===
- Sri Venugopala satakam
- Sri Bhradrakali satakam
- Jaladhi Seekarm

=== Dramas ===
- Malavikagnimitram
- Vikramourvaseeyam

=== Translations ===
- Kumarasambhavam (From Sanskrit to Telugu)
- Lalladevi Vakkulu (From Kashmiri to Telugu)
- Basaveswaravachanani (from Kannada to Sanskrit)

== See also ==
- Sri Raja-Lakshmi Foundation
