= Sarvesh =

Sarvesh is an Indian male given name meaning the "supreme being". Notable people with the name include:

- Sarvesh Amte, Indian speed skater
- Sarvesh Asthana (born 1965), Indian poet, writer and satirist
- Sarvesh Kumar (born 1989), Indian cricketer
- Sarvesh Kushare (born 1995), Indian athlete
- Sarvesh Murari, Indian cinematographer
- Sarvesh Singh Seepu (died 2013), Indian politician
- Sarvesh Singh Yadav, Indian politician

== See also ==
- Sarveswara (disambiguation)
