= Venugopal Rao =

Venugopal Rao or Venugopala Rao is one of the Indian names:

- Kamichetty Venougopala Rao Naidou, former mayor and MLA of Yanam Municipality
- Pappu Venugopala Rao, Indian educationist and musicologist
- Yalaka Venugopal Rao, Indian cricketer
