= Malladi Chandrasekhara Sastry =

Indian Hindu guru (1925–2022)

- Born: 22 August 1925; Krosuru, Andhra Pradesh, British Raj
- Died: 14 January 2022 (aged 96); Hyderabad, Telangana, India
- Occupation(s): Scholar, guru, television and radio personality

Malladi Chandrasekhara Sastry (22 August 1925 – 14 January 2022) was an Indian scholar and television personality who specialized in the Vedas and Puranas texts in the Telugu and Sanskrit languages. His works have included commentaries on All India Radio during Bhadrachalam's Sitarama Kalyanam and Brahmotsavam festivals. For Ugadi day, he recited the Panchanga Sravanam (almanac reading). On television he hosted a show Dharma Sandehalu and Dharma Sukshmalu where he answered questions regarding the Purana and various aspects of Hinduism. The show is telecast on the Sri Venkateswara Bhakti Channel and formerly on the Doordarshan Saptagiri Channel. He was the principal of a college run by the trust named Tirumala Tirupati Devasthanams where they do pravachan (lectures) on the Puranas. He received the Raja-Lakshmi Award in 2005, and has also been conferred the title of Purana Vachaspati.

== Early life ==
Sastry was born on 22 August 1925 to Adilakshmamma and Dakshinamurthy in Krosuru, in the Guntur district of Andhra Pradesh. He was a native of Amaravathi village, Guntur district. His grandfather, Sriman Malladi Ramakrishna Chainulu, was not only an authority in Vedic and Sanskrit literature, but also a propagator of the Advaita Vedanta Siddhanta (doctrine) over Andhra Pradesh. Sastry studied in the fields of Vedas, vyakaranam (grammar), tarkam (logic), poorva meemamsa (extension of the Vedas), and vedanta sastram (Indian spiritualism). He also studied the Puranas in Hinduism.

When he was 19, he delivered Pravachan (lectures) about the Ramayana. His speaking ability allowed him to give a discourse at an event presided over by scholar Viswanatha Satyanarayana at Vijayawada. Sastry cited the Ramayana, the Mahabharata, the Bhagavata Purana, and the oratorios of Dattatreya among his favorite works for discourses.

== Career ==
Sastry established himself as an authority in the Vedas and the Astadasha Puranas texts. He provided commentaries on All India Radio during Bhadrachalam's Sitarama Kalyanam and Brahmotsavam festivals. On television, he hosted a show Dharma Sandehalu and Dharma Sukshmalu where he answered questions regarding the Purana and various aspects of Hinduism. The show is telecast on the Sri Venkateswara Bhakti Channel and formerly on the Doordarshan Saptagiri Channel.

On Ugadi day, he recited the Panchanga Sravanam (almanac reading). Writers have noted that he delivered his orations "with a pinch of humour".

He was the principal of a college run by the trust named Tirumala Tirupati Devasthanams where they do pravachan (lectures) on the Puranas.

== Personal life and death ==
Sastry was married and had six sons and two daughters. Sastry died at his residence in Hyderabad, on 14 January 2022 at 5:15pm, at the age of 96

== Awards and accolades ==
- Sastry was given the title "Abhinava Vyasa" for his writings and discourses and for compiling and codifying the Vedas and Puranas texts.
- Sastry was conferred the title of Purana Vachaspati.
- In 2005, Sastry received an award from the Sri Raja-Lakshmi Foundation.
- Sringeri Sankara Mutt presented him with the title of "Savyasachi".
- The Sanathana Dharma Trust presented him with the Eminent Citizens Award.
