= Sarveswara Satakam =

Sarveswara Satakam (Telugu: సర్వేశ్వర శతకము) is Shaiva Bhakti Satakam, a collection of Telugu poems written by Yathavakkula Annamayya. He dedicated it to Lord Mallikarjuna of Srisailam.

It was written in 1242 in Dudikonda village in praise of Someshwara, a name of Shiva. It consists of 139 poems ending with Sarveswara.
