= Biruduraju Ramaraju =

Indian folklorist

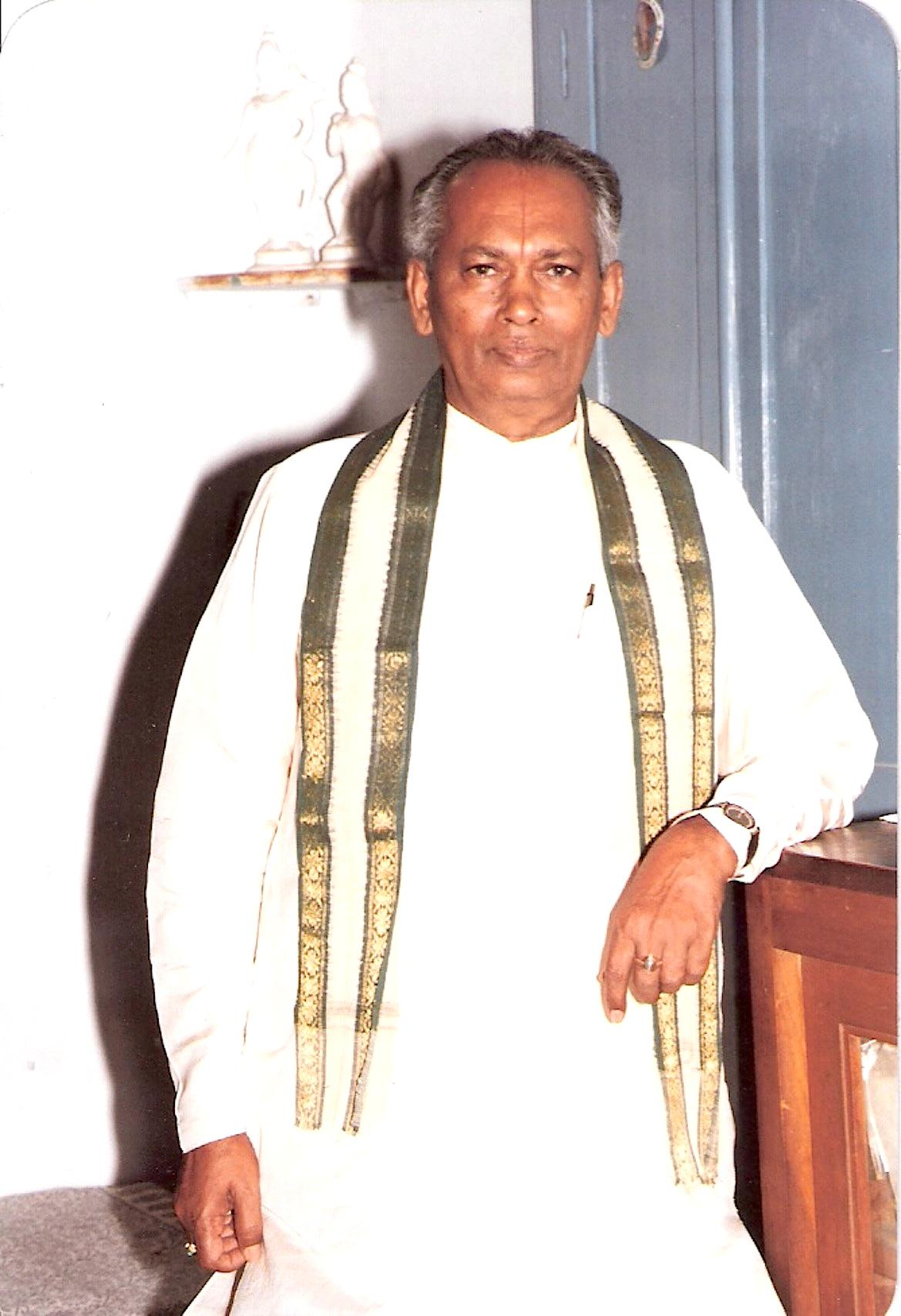
- Biruduraju Ramaraju
- Born: 16 April 1925; Warangal district, Hyderabad State (now Telangana), India
- Died: 8 February 2010 (aged 84); Hyderabad, Andhra Pradesh (now Telangana), India

Biruduraju Ramaraju (16 April 1925 – 8 February 2010) was an Indian writer, scholar and professor best known for his study of Telugu-language folklore.

Ramaraju had also been active in Hindu nationalist organizations. He was one of the main members of the Rashtriya Swayamsevak Sangh (RSS) in 1974. He became the Andhra Pradesh state President for the Vishva Hindu Parishad in 1980's and led the Ram Janmbhoomi Movement in 1984.

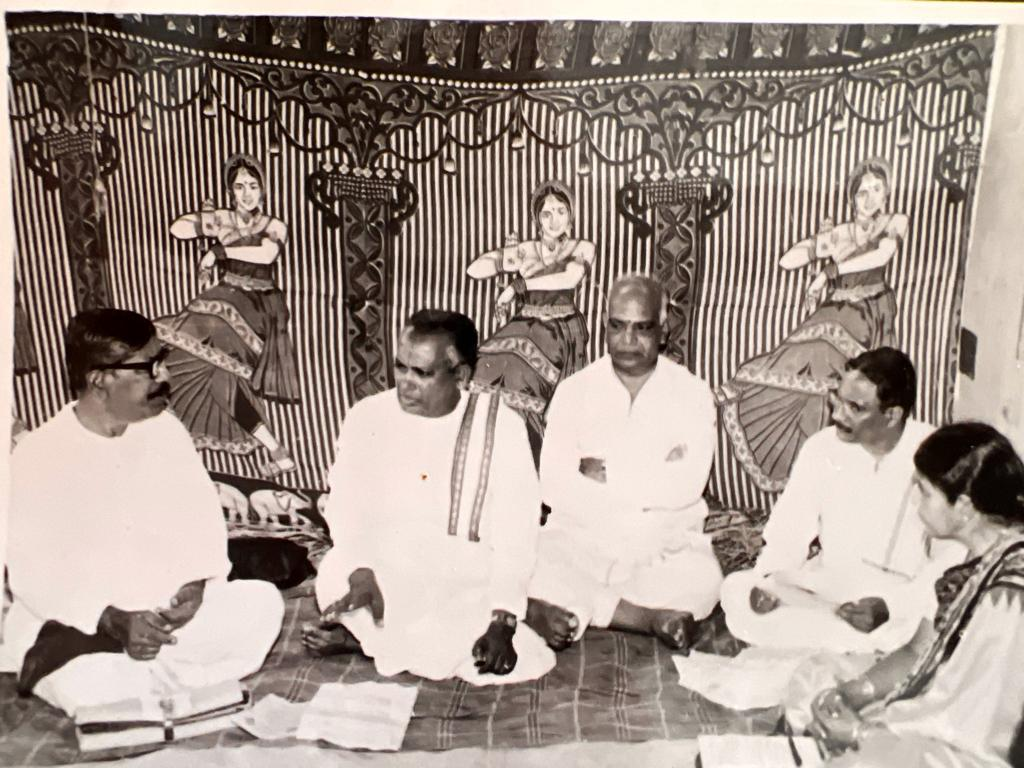
Meeting at Vishva Hindu Parishad, presided by Andhra Pradesh President, Biruduraju Ramaraju with vice- president G. Pulla Reddy at the organization.

== Life and career ==
Ramaraju was born in a family of wealthy zamindars (landlords) in a remote village named Devunuru located in present-day Telangana, India on 16 April 1925. He was able to complete his primary education in the village, but had to walk 14 km to Madikonda, near Hanamkonda and now a part of the district centre of Warangal, for his secondary schooling. During the 1940s, Ramaraju got involved in politics, dabbling in the Arya Samaj and the Andhra Mahasabha as well as participating in the Indian independence movement, culminating in his imprisonment for three months in 1947 for his participation in one of Gandhi's satyagrahas. Although he wished to attend the London School of Economics, his father's death later that year meant he had to stay home and take care of his family instead, but he was still determined to study his academic interests and decided to complete his higher education in-state.

He studied up to the graduate level in Nizam College before joining Osmania University for his post-graduate studies, which he finished in 1951. In 1952 Ramaraju decided to study folklore and graduated with a PhD in Telugu folklore in 1956, being the first holder of a doctorate in Telugu language and literature at Osmania as well as reportedly the first holder of a PhD in folklore in all of South India, despite the disdain that other scholars and the university administration had for folk arts as a field of study. Despite winning a seat in parliament during the 1952 elections as a member of the Indian National Congress, Ramaraju refused to take it up in order to continue with his folklore studies.

"Telugu Janapada Geya Sahityamu" (Telugu Folk Song Literature), his doctoral dissertation, was first published in the late 1950s and later republished multiple times due to its importance, being considered the "Bible" of Telugu folklore studies. After seeing the poor state of palm-leaf manuscript preservation through an encounter he had with a priest in 1953, Ramaraju decided to research and collect them, travelling throughout the country to do so. He would get a Master of Arts and another PhD in Sanskrit during this process; his thesis, published as a book titled Contribution of Andhras to Sanskrit Literature, which publicized the contribution of Telugu people to Telugu and Sanskrit literature in that period. He also became the first person to document the saints of Andhra Pradesh after seeing no recognition for them by previous scholars. Additionally, he was also proficient in Urdu and edited an Urdu-Telugu dictionary, and also translated works by Sarat Chandra Chatterjee and Premchand into Telugu for the first time. Ramaraju later become a professor at the Department of Telugu at Osmania, and would also serve as a visiting professor at over fifty universities in the country as well as given opportunities to travel abroad as part of cultural exchange projects. In his later career, he would become dean of the department, publish numerous researcher papers and encyclopedia articles, and give talks on the radio before his retirement. In 1995, the Indian government granted him the title of National Research Professor.

Ramaraju died at his home in Hyderabad on 8 February 2010. Kakatiya University Telugu Department held a meeting to eulogize him, and his collection was donated to C P Brown Memorial Library in Kadapa.

== See also ==
- Telugu folk literature
