= Pappu Venugopala Rao =

- Born: 30 June 1948 (age 78)
- Origin: Andhra Pradesh
- Died: 7 April 2024
- Genre: Musicologist
- Occupations: Musicologist, writer

Dr.Pappu Venugopala Rao (born 30 June 1948 and died on April 7th, 2024) was a well-known Indian educationist and renowned musicologist. He specialized in Telugu and Sanskrit literature. He was also a writer and has written on varied subjects such as Music, Culture and spiritual subjects.

== Early life ==
Pappu as he is fondly known was born in Vizianagaram, Andhra Pradesh. He has post graduated in English, Telugu and Sanskrit Literature from M. R. College, Vizianagaram. He earned his doctorate in Telugu and Sanskrit.

== Career ==
Pappu Venugopal Rao began his career as a Lecturer in Telugu at Mrs.AVN College, Visakhapatnam. Since 1980 he had been working with the American Institute of Indian Studies and retired as its Associate Director General for the Southern Indian region during 2008. He is presently the organisation's Consultant.

He is actively involved in research activities in Carnatic Music and Dance songs. He has delivered several lectures and presentations on the subject.

Dr.Pappu Venugopala Rao is also a book reviewer for the newspaper The Hindu and a contributing editor to Sruti Magazine.

== Cultural ==
- Performed 'Ashtavadhanam' about twenty times in Telugu and Sanskrit languages.
- Delivered about 50 Lecture Demonstrations on various topics on Music & Kuchipudi Dance with Vempati Chinna Satyam in India and abroad.
- Delivered about 100 lectures on literature.

== Dance Dramas ==
S.No.	Name of Drama
01	'Agni Sambhuta' performed by Shri Dhananjayan and his disciple Anitha
02	'Satyam Shivam Sundaram' in Sanskrit choreographed by Kishore and performed by Sailaja of Saila Sudha
03	'Om Shanti' in Sanskrit choreographed by Kishore & performed by Sujatha Vinjamuri in the US
04	'Grahaanugraha' in Sanskrit performed by Vasantha Viaikunth in UAE & US
05	'Guru Stuti' in Sanskrit performed by Anuradha Nehru in the US
06	'Pitrarchana' in Sanskrit choreographed by Kishore & performed by Uma Muralikrishna
07	'Gajamukha' in Sanskrit performed by Jayanthi Raman in the US and world over.
08	'Stree' in Sanskrit performed by Vyjayanthi Kashi
09	'Kundalini' in Sanskrit choreographed by Kishore & performed by Sujatha Vinjamuri in the US.
10	'Pada Kavitaa Pithamaha' performed by Anita Guha's Bharantanjali
11	'Uddava Gita' in Sanskrit – Concept, Choreography and Bharatanatyam by Bala Devi Chandrashekar.

== Sexual Harassment Allegation ==
On October 23 2017, Rao’s name figured on a list of ‘alleged sexual offenders from academia’ released online by US-based law student Raya Sarkar. She published 69 names, inviting criticism from some quarters on taking activism to levels of absurdity.

On 17 November 2017, The secretary of Madras Music Academy, Pappu Venugopala Rao, resigned from his post. Ever since, there has been much speculation around his resignation — while some say it was an impending decision, some believe it has to do with the fact that his name appears on a list of sexual harassers and offenders from academia.

Pappu Venugopal Rao however has denied all allegations against him.

== Books published ==
S.No.	Name of Publication
01	Thematic identity between the Mahabharata & Bhagavata Purana in Sanskrit & Telugu (Doctoral dissertation)
02	Bhagavata Tattvamu – Manavattvamu
03	Commentary for the Bhaja Govindam
04	Bhagavata Katha Sudha Vol I – II & III
05	Nityarchana
06	Bhuvana Vijayam
07	Adi Sankarula Jeevita Charitra
08	English translation of Dasarathy Satakam
09	Flowers at His Feet
10	Rama Paada Yatra
11	Science of Sri Cakra

12. Nritta Ratnavali book released in 2013 by Dr.Pappu Venugopala Rao & co authored by Dr. Yasoda.

== Awards ==
- Dr.K.V.Rao & Dr.Jyoti Rao Award in association with Sri Raja-Lakshmi Foundation and the Telugu Fine Arts Society, New Jersey, USA.

Titles:

- Aasukavi Sekhara conferred by Prof. S.V.Jogarao
- Kalavipanchi
- Sangeetha Saastra Visaarada
- Sangeeta Saastra Siromani
- Ashtavadhaana Sekhara

== Newspaper article links ==
- "'Science of Sri Cakra' released". The Hindu. 15 March 2008. Archived from the original on 18 March 2008.
- "From the pages of History". The Hindu. 27 July 2007. Archived from the original on 26 October 2012.
- "Book on Annamacharya's compositions released". The Hindu. 24 April 2006. Archived from the original on 19 May 2006.
- "Uddhava's anguish". The Hindu. 13 December 2012.
- "Nritta, natya, music… philosophy". The Hindu. 28 December 2012. Archived from the original on 31 August 2014.
