= Bhavaraju Sarveswara Rao =

Indian economist and social Scientist

Bhavaraju Sarveswara Rao was an Indian economist and a social scientist.

== Personal life ==
He was born in Peddapuram in the East Godavari district of Andhra Pradesh in India in 1915 to parents Parabrahma Murthy and Lakshmi. His early schooling was in Peddapuram and Rajahmundry. For his higher education he moved to Visakhapatnam to study at the Andhra University. He earned his PhD from St John's College, Cambridge in 1958.

== Death ==
He died 23 September 2010.
