= Ramaraju =

Play by Srinivasa Rao

Ramaraju is a play written by Srinivasa Rao. Its subject is the fall of the Vijayanagara.

== See also ==
- Vijayanagara Empire
- Vijayanagara
- Aliya Rama Raya
- Deccan Sultanates
